= New York State Route 391 =

State highway in Erie County, New York, US

New York State Route 391
- Map of the Buffalo area with NY 391 highlighted in red

Route information
- Maintained by NYSDOT
- Length: 3.62 mi (5.83 km)
- Existed: June 1971–present

Major junctions
- South end: NY 277 in Boston
- US 219 in Boston
- North end: US 62 in Hamburg

Location
- Country: United States
- State: New York
- Counties: Erie

Highway system
- New York Highways; Interstate; US; State; Reference; Parkways
← NY 390A	→ NY 392

New York State Route 391 (NY 391) is a short state highway in Erie County, New York, in the United States. The route is signed as north–south; however, it follows more of a southeast–northwest alignment between NY 277 in the hamlet of North Boston and U.S. Route 62 (US 62) in the village of Hamburg. NY 391 meets the Southern Expressway (US 219) just north of North Boston. Both ends of NY 391 are located in residential areas; however, the middle section of the route passes through more rural areas of the towns of Boston and Hamburg.

The routing of NY 391 has been part of several routes over the years, beginning with NY 62 in 1930. NY 62 was mostly renumbered to NY 75 c. 1932, and all of NY 75 south of Hamburg became concurrent to US 219 when it was extended into New York c. 1935. NY 75 was cut back to Hamburg by 1940, leaving just US 219 on modern NY 391. US 219 was realigned north of North Boston in the early 1970s to follow other routes north to meet the first completed piece of the Southern Expressway near Orchard Park. NY 391 was assigned to US 219's former routing into Hamburg at this time. The route originally ended two blocks to the west at the junction of NY 75 and US 62; however, this extension was eliminated c. 2004.

== Route description ==
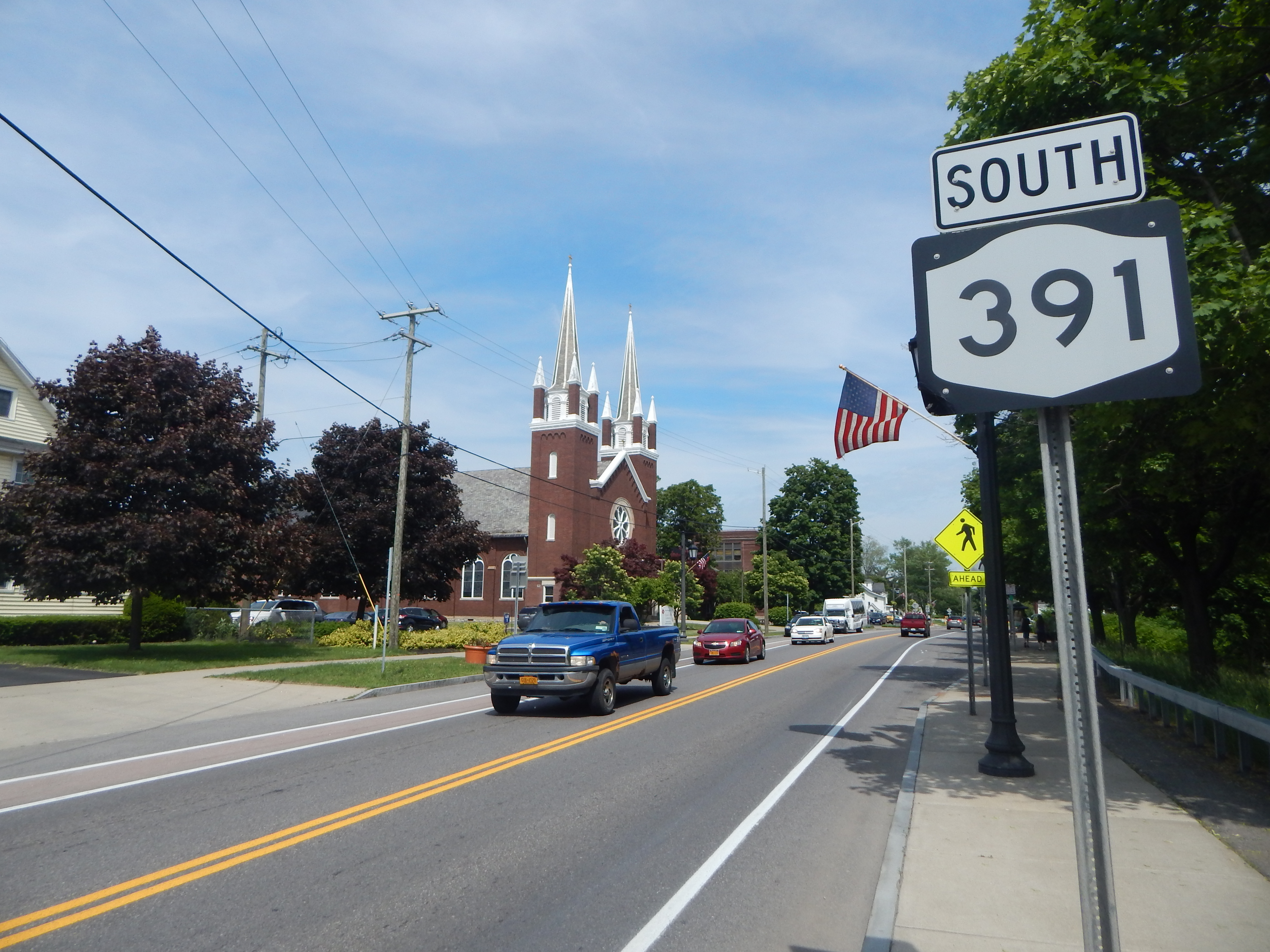
NY 391 southbound heading away from US 62 in Hamburg

NY 391 begins at an intersection with NY 277 (Herman Hill Road) in North Boston, a hamlet within the town of Boston. It heads to the northwest as Boston State Road, passing by suburban homes as it approaches the Southern Expressway (US 219). The two highways meet by way of a diamond interchange. West of the exit, NY 391's surroundings become more rural as it enters the town of Hamburg, where it passes by open fields and a handful of houses.

The route follows Eighteen Mile Creek northwest and west toward the village of Hamburg, where the amount of development along the highway increases significantly. At McKinley Parkway (County Route 204), NY 391 becomes East Main Street and begins to pass through the outskirts of the village. It officially enters Hamburg upon intersecting Sunnyside Drive two blocks to the west. The route continues into the village center, passing by commercial and residential buildings on its way to a roundabout at Buffalo Street, where it meets US 62. At this point, NY 391 comes to an end while US 62 turns west onto Main Street from Buffalo Street.

== History ==
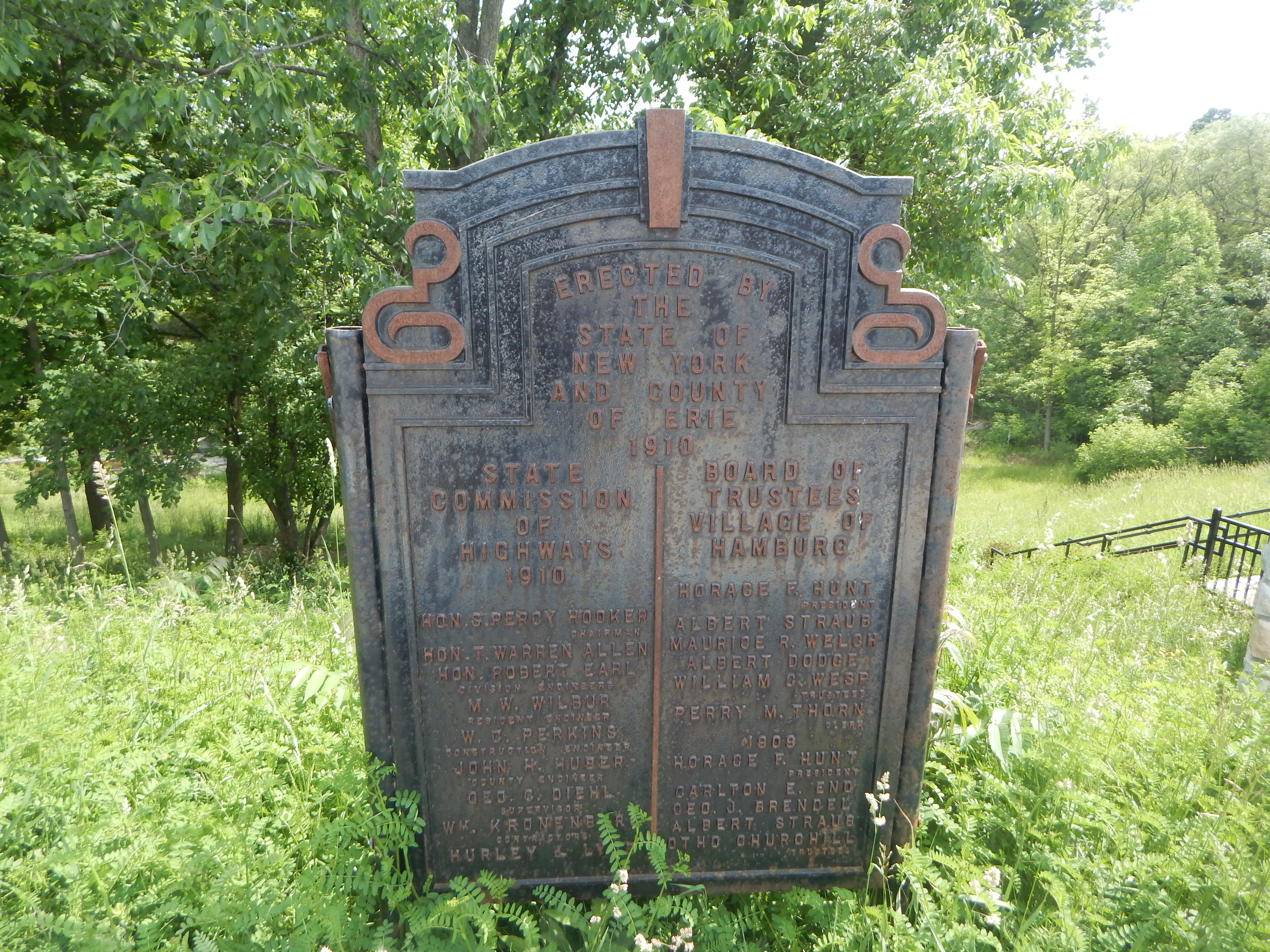
Bronze plaque at the junction of US 62 and NY 391 denoting construction of the highway, dating to 1910

What is now NY 391 was originally designated as part of NY 62, a highway extending from Great Valley north to Buffalo, in the 1930 renumbering of state highways in New York. US 62 was extended into New York c. 1932; as a result, all of NY 62 south of Athol Springs was redesignated as NY 75 to eliminate numerical duplication with the U.S. Highway. US 219 was extended into New York c. 1935, overlapping NY 75 between Great Valley and Hamburg. The overlap was eliminated by 1940 following the truncation of NY 75 to what had been the west end of its overlap with US 62 through Hamburg.

In the early 1970s, construction began on the Southern Expressway, a limited-access highway connecting Buffalo to Springville. The first segment of the expressway—between the New York State Thruway east of Lackawanna and US 20A west of Orchard Park—opened to traffic by 1973 as a realignment of US 219. In between the end of the expressway and North Boston, US 219 temporarily overlapped US 20A and NY 277. The former routing of US 219 from North Boston to Hamburg was redesignated as NY 391 in June 1971.

An extension of the freeway south to NY 391 near North Boston opened in the mid-1970s, resulting in a slight, temporary truncation of NY 391 to the end of the freeway. Another extension of the expressway south to Springville was completed in the early 1980s. It became part of US 219 upon opening; at the same time, NY 391 was reextended to NY 277 in North Boston. The remainder of US 219's former routing south to Springville was transferred to Erie County upon the completion of the Springville–Buffalo segment of the Southern Expressway. Originally, NY 391 terminated at NY 75 in Hamburg, resulting in an extraneous overlap with US 62 for two blocks along Main Street. NY 391 was truncated to the eastern end of the concurrency c. 2004.

== Major intersections ==
The entire route is in Erie County.

Location	mi	km	Destinations	Notes
Boston	0.00	0.00	NY 277 north (Herman Hill Road)	Southern terminus; hamlet of North Boston; southern terminus of NY 277
Boston	0.79	1.27	US 219 (Southern Expressway) – Buffalo, Springville	Interchange
Village of Hamburg	3.62	5.83	US 62 (Main Street / Buffalo Street)	Roundabout; northern terminus
1.000 mi = 1.609 km; 1.000 km = 0.621 mi
