= Boston, New York =

- Town
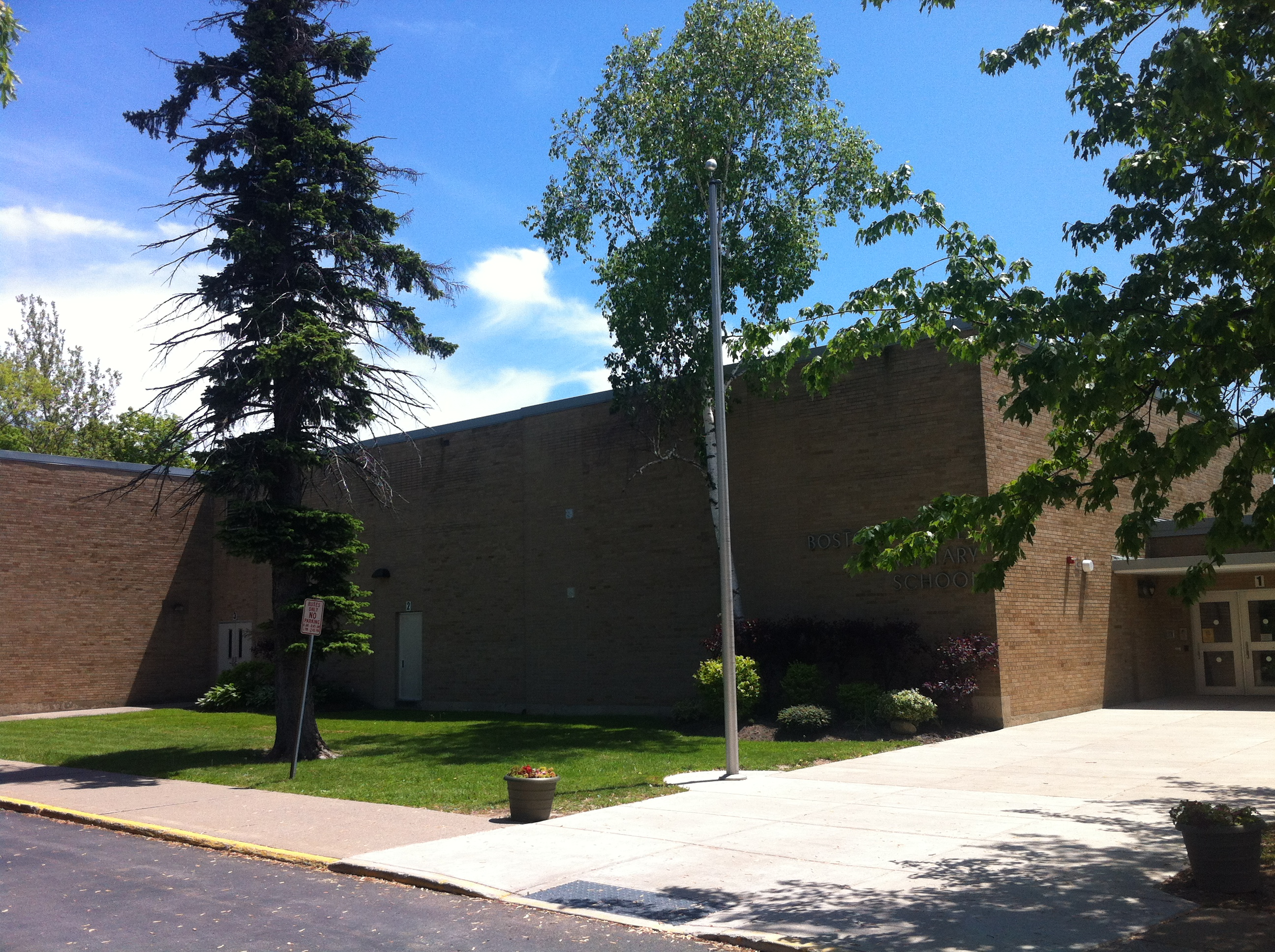
- Boston Valley Elementary School

- Flag Seal

- Location in Erie County and the state of New York.

- Location of New York in the United States
- Coordinates: 42°37′44″N 78°44′15″W
- Country: United States
- State: New York
- County: Erie County
- Incorporated: 1817
- Named for: Boston, Massachusetts

Government
  - Supervisor: Jason Keding (R) Town Council: Kathleen Selby (R); Max Stephan (R); Robert Penders (R); Kelly Martin(R); Town Clerk: Sandra Quinlan (R); Town Justice: Debra Bender

Area
  - Total: 35.82 sq mi (92.78 km^{2})
  - Land: 35.82 sq mi (92.78 km^{2})
  - Water: 0 sq mi (0.00 km^{2})
- Elevation: 925 ft (282 m)

Population (2020)
  - Total: 7,948 ▼
  - Density: 225.0/sq mi (86.88/km^{2})
- Time zone: UTC-5 (EST)
  - Summer (DST): UTC-4 (EDT)
- ZIP Codes: 14025 (Boston); 14033 (Colden); 14057 (Eden); 14075 (Hamburg); 14127 (Orchard Park)
- Area code: 716
- FIPS code: 36-029-07454
- Website: www.bostonny.gov

Boston is a town in Erie County, New York, United States. The population was 7,948 at the 2020 census. The town is named after Boston, Massachusetts.

Boston is an interior town of the county and one of the county's "Southtowns". Boston is southeast of Buffalo.

== History ==
The Iroquois, under various names, lived here until the European immigrants became predominant.

In 1804, brothers Charles and Oliver Johnson and their families became the area's first settlers. The first Christian church was the Free Will Baptist Church, founded circa 1811. On April 5, 1817, the town of Boston was formed from a portion of the town of Eden. The first post office opened in 1832 on the north side of town.

In 1843, the town suffered an epidemic (28 of the 43 residents were affected, 10 of whom died) believed to be typhoid fever, possibly from a local well.

This town has much history that can be found on the headstones in the Maplewood Cemetery across from the Boston Town Hall. There are many old gravestones that show some of the first settlers in the town and the infamous "Love" murder.

Boston, New York in 1910, with a view of the Boston Hotel, church, and F. W. Wurtz furniture store

=== Murder of John Love ===
John Love, a seaman on the Great Lakes, came to Boston in October 1824 with the prospect of buying grain futures from local farmers. He rented a room from lumberman Nelson Thayer. The Thayer family, which included Nelson and his brothers Isaac and Israel, were infamous for their profanity and crude behavior. Despite owning large tracts of farmland in Boston, they found themselves indebted to neighbors, and eventually to Love, due to their spendthrift habits. Facing financial ruin, the Thayers decided that murder was the only option.

On December 15, John Love was talking with Nelson Thayer when Isaac came up to the window from outside and shot Love in the head with a rifle. When this failed to kill him, Nelson struck him several times with a meat axe. He and Israel then dragged Love's body to a ravine behind Israel's house and hastily covered it with dirt.

Neighbors grew suspicious after Love hadn't been seen in several weeks, and the Thayers, now having far more money to spend than usual, rode around on Love's horse attempting to collect debts owed to him by others. When questioned, they would say that Love had gone to Canada and had given the Thayers power of attorney to collect debt payments. Foul play was eventually suspected, and a $10 reward was offered to whoever found Love's body. On February 23, 1825, Love's body was discovered in the ravine behind the Thayer cabin, in a grave so shallow that his feet were sticking out. The three brothers were arrested, as was their father Israel Sr., and taken to jail in Buffalo.

At trial, the Thayers were linked to the crime based on strong circumstantial evidence; neighbors testified to hearing a gunshot on December 15 and never seeing Love again after that date. The Thayer brothers were all found guilty of John Love's murder and sentenced to death. The charges against their father had been dropped. On June 17, 1825, all three were hanged from the same gallows in Niagara Square, the only public hanging ever to take place in Erie County. It is said that a crowd of about 20,000 people witnessed the event, far greater than the population of Buffalo at that time.

=== The Railroad ===
In 1902, Frank and Charles Goodyear, co-presidents of the Buffalo and Susquehanna Railroad, sought construction of a line running from Wellsville to Buffalo, whose harbor would be a convenient point from which to ship coal and lumber from the center of Pennsylvania. Construction through Boston was time-consuming, as the gully cut by Landon Brook (near the south town line) had to be filled in with earth. The work was completed by late 1906, and the hamlets of Boston, Patchin, and North Boston would each receive a station.

Unfortunately for the Goodyears, the line to Buffalo never generated a positive revenue, as they had gotten into considerable debt building it. This, combined with overextension and the decline of the lumber industry, led to the railroad going bankrupt. It was sold off in 1915 to the Wellsville and Buffalo Railroad, who ran passenger trains until November 1916. World War I increased the demand for scrap metal, so the unprofitable line was quickly pulled up, bringing an end to the railroad industry in Boston. Today, National Grid's power lines mark the former route, and several concrete culverts still remain.

== Geography ==
According to the United States Census Bureau, the town has a total area of 35.8 square miles (92.8 km^{2}).

Geologically speaking, Boston is one of the more interesting places in the Greater Niagara region, for many glacial activities, over many years, caused sufficient pressure indentation to alter dramatically the landscape and even the water table.

U.S. Route 219 crosses the town. New York State Route 277 (Boston State Road/Herman Hill Road) intersects New York State Route 391 (Boston State Road) in the northwestern part of the town at North Boston.

== Demographics ==
Historical population
Census	Pop.	Note	%±
1820	686		—
1830	1,520		121.6%
1840	1,745		14.8%
1850	1,872		7.3%
1860	1,716		−8.3%
1870	1,633		−4.8%
1880	1,617		−1.0%
1890	1,278		−21.0%
1900	1,398		9.4%
1910	1,535		9.8%
1920	1,325		−13.7%
1930	1,368		3.2%
1940	1,710		25.0%
1950	2,302		34.6%
1960	5,106		121.8%
1970	7,158		40.2%
1980	7,687		7.4%
1990	7,445		−3.1%
2000	7,897		6.1%
2010	8,023		1.6%
2020	7,948		−0.9%
U.S. Decennial Census

As of the census of 2000, there were 7,897 people, 2,997 households, and 2,244 families residing in the town. The population density was 220.4 inhabitants per square mile (85.1/km^{2}). There were 3,122 housing units at an average density of 87.1 per square mile (33.6/km^{2}). The racial makeup of the town was 98.91% white, 0.14% African American, 0.14% Native American, 0.20% Asian, 0.01% Pacific Islander, 0.10% from other races, and 0.49% from two or more races. Hispanic or Latino of any race were 0.72% of the population.

There were 2,997 households, out of which 33.3% had children under the age of 18 living with them, 64.6% were married couples living together, 7.0% had a female householder with no husband present, and 25.1% were non-families. 20.6% of all households were made up of individuals, and 8.8% had someone living alone who was 65 years of age or older. The average household size was 2.63 and the average family size was 3.06.

In the town, the population was spread out, with 25.2% under the age of 18, 6.3% from 18 to 24, 28.7% from 25 to 44, 27.1% from 45 to 64, and 12.7% who were 65 years of age or older. The median age was 40 years. For every 100 females, there were 100.8 males. For every 100 females aged 18 and over, there were 98.2 males.

The median income for a household in the town was $48,315, and the median income for a family was $57,714. Males had a median income of $42,101 versus $27,798 for females. The per capita income for the town was $21,303. About 3.6% of families and 5.9% of the population were below the poverty line, including 8.0% of those under age 18 and 4.5% of those age 65 or over.

== Communities and locations in Boston ==
- Boston – A hamlet in the southern part of the town on Boston State Road, NY-391. The community was once called "Boston Corners" and "Torrey Corners".
- Boston Forest County Park – An undeveloped conservation area in the southwestern corner of the town, consisting of 700 acres (2.8 km^{2}) of woodland and meadows.
- Creekside – A location by the northern town line, north of North Boston.
- East Boston Hill – A location near the eastern town line.
- Eighteen Mile Creek – A stream that flows northward through the town.
- North Boston – A hamlet and CDP in the northwestern part of the town.
- Patchin – A hamlet located near the town's center on the Boston State Road. The community was once known as "Boston Center". It was named after early resident Talcott Patchin, a tanner and postmaster.
- Ski Tamarack – A former skiing location in the northeastern corner of the town.

== Notable people ==
- Charles Miller, commander of the organization now known as the 28th Infantry Division and founder of the Galena-Signal Oil Company, which became part of the Standard Oil combine, and then part of the corporation now known as Texaco.
- Joseph C. Sibley, U.S. representative from Pennsylvania
- A. Chapin Whiting, member of the Wisconsin State Assembly
- Ellen Beach Yaw, coloratura soprano known for her exceptional vocal range.
