= New York State Route 219 =

New York State Route 219 may refer to:

- New York State Route 219 (1930–1935) in Broome and Chenango Counties
- U.S. Route 219 in New York, the only route numbered "219" in New York since the mid-1930s
