= New York State Route 20A =

New York State Route 20A may refer to:

- New York State Route 20A (1930–1932) in Chautauqua County
- New York State Route 20A (1938–1939) in Livingston County
- U.S. Route 20A (New York), the only route numbered 20A in New York since the late 1930s
