= New York State Route 62 =

New York State Route 62 may refer to:

- New York State Route 62 (1920s–1930) in Allegany, Wyoming, Genesee, and Orleans Counties
- New York State Route 62 (1930–1932) in Cattaraugus and Erie Counties
- U.S. Route 62 in New York, the only route numbered "62" in New York since the early 1930s
