= New York State Route 240 =

State highway in western New York, US

New York State Route 240
- Map of western New York with NY 240 highlighted in red and NY 950M highlighted in blue

Route information
- Maintained by NYSDOT, Cattaraugus County, and Erie County
- Length: 51.64 mi (83.11 km)
- Existed: 1930–present

Major junctions
- South end: NY 242 in Ellicottville
- US 20A in Orchard Park village; US 20 in Orchard Park town; NY 400 in West Seneca; NY 33 in Cheektowaga
- North end: I-290 / NY 324 in Amherst

Location
- Country: United States
- State: New York
- Counties: Cattaraugus, Erie

Highway system
- New York Highways; Interstate; US; State; Reference; Parkways
← NY 239	→ NY 241

New York State Route 240 (NY 240) is a 51.64-mile (83.11 km) state highway in western New York in the United States. The southern terminus of the route is at an intersection with NY 242 in the Ellicottville community of Ashford Junction in northern Cattaraugus County. Its northern terminus is at a junction with NY 324 and Interstate 290 (I-290) in Amherst in northern Erie County. The route passes through the villages of Springville and Orchard Park, where it meets NY 39 and U.S. Route 20A (US 20A), respectively. Much of NY 240 between Concord and Aurora follows the west branch of Cazenovia Creek. The northern part of NY 240 in Erie County, named Harlem Road, is a major north–south route through the suburbs east of the city of Buffalo.

From its southern terminus at NY 242 to the hamlet of Glenwood in the town of Colden, NY 240 is a state highway in name only as the roadway is maintained by the highway departments of Cattaraugus and Erie counties. Within Cattaraugus County, NY 242 is co-designated as County Route 32 (CR 32). CR 32 is the only route that has a marked concurrency with a state route in the county. At the county line, it becomes County Route 198 and, later, County Route 30 before becoming state-maintained in Glenwood. A section between CR 198 and CR 30 is also designated as part of CR 27.

NY 240 was first designated in the renumbering of state highways in New York in 1930 from NY 39 in Springville to NY 18 near downtown Buffalo. The portion between Springville and Ashford was a section of NY 62 and Harlem Road was unnumbered. The section south of CR 16 in West Valley was a portion of NY 242. NY 240 instead used Abbott Road and South Park Avenue to get to Buffalo, which got extended to NY 5 in the 1930s. NY 240 was realigned south to Ellicottville in the mid-1960s, after numerous bypasses and realignments had been done by the State of New York Department of Public Works. NY 240 was realigned onto Harlem Road c. 1962. The former alignment to Buffalo is now designated as NY 950M, a reference route.

== Route description ==
=== Cattaraugus County ===
NY 240 begins at an intersection with NY 242 in the town of Ellicottville along the western leg of a railroad wye near Beaver Meadows Creek. NY 240 proceeds northward alongside Beaver Meadows Creek co-designated as County Route 32 (CR 32; West Valley Road). The routes proceed northward through Ellicottville as a two-lane roadway through dense forestry, bending northward along the creek and a nearby railroad track. The dense forestry remains for several miles, before bending northeast into an intersection with Fancy Tract Road. NY 240 and CR 32 continue northeast as the dense woods retreat for residences before bending northwest away from Beaver Meadows Creek. After bending northward once more, the routes cross through large fields and past several houses along West Valley Road.

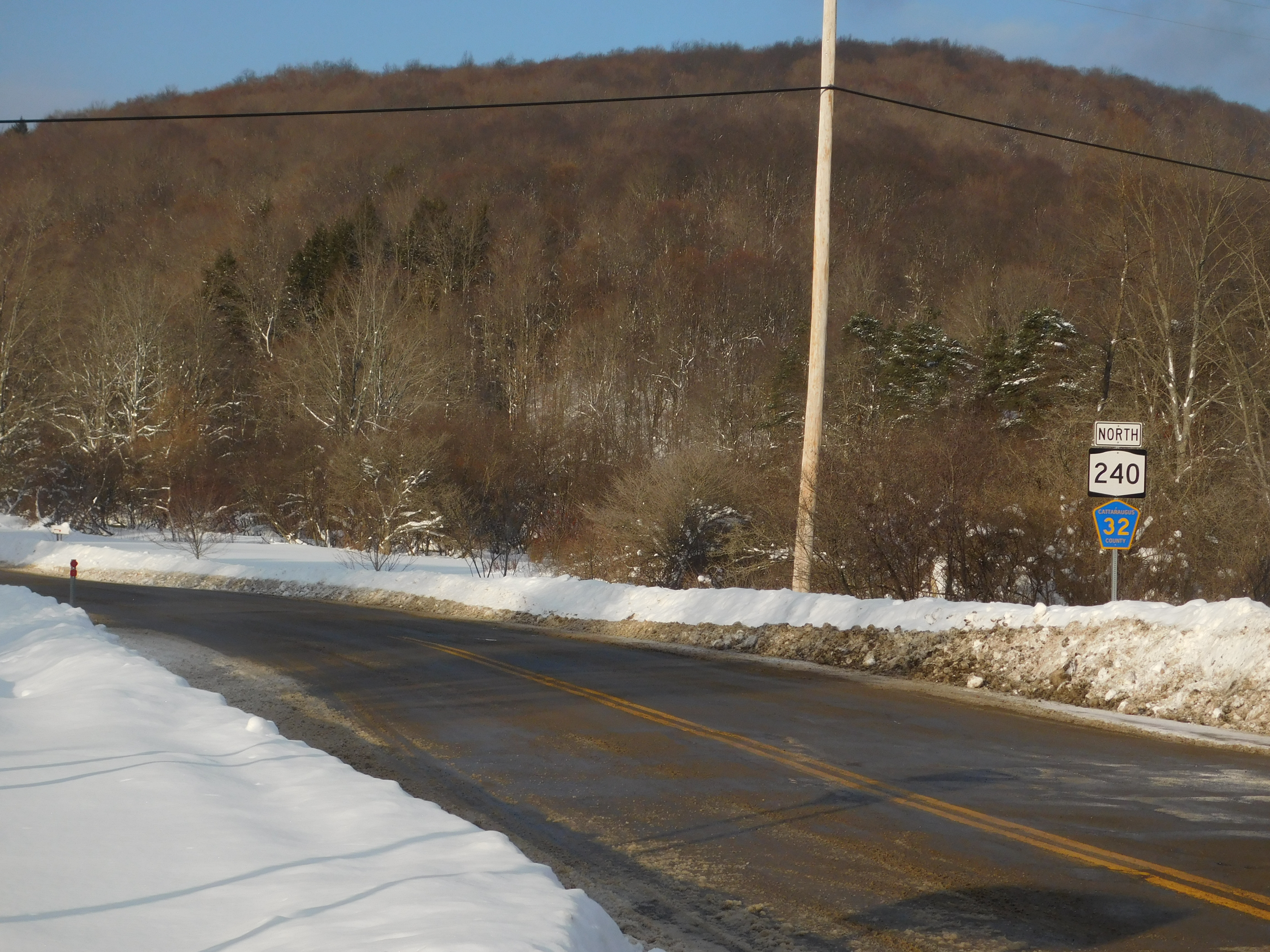
NY 240 northbound co-signed with CR 32 through the town of Ashford, as seen at the junction with NY 242

Continuing north, NY 240 and CR 32 intersect with the eastern terminus of CR 75 (Beaver Meadows Road). The routes continue winding northward, crossing the town line into the town of Ashford at Town Line Road. At that junction, the routes bend northwest again, passing a stretch of residences before intersecting with the western terminus of CR 16 (Roszyk Hill Road). At CR 16, NY 240 and CR 32 bend north, becoming a residential street as it enters the hamlet of West Valley. In West Valley, the routes intersect with the terminus of CR 53 (Ashford Hill Road).

Through West Valley, the route remains residential, quickly leaving the hamlet. North of West Valley, NY 240 and CR 32 intersect with the eastern terminus of CR 86 (Thornwood Drive). Crossing through another long stretch of residences, the routes cross a railroad track at-grade, where they turn to the northwest, paralleling the tracks until turning north and away once again. NY 240 and CR 32 bend northwest at Fox Valley Road, intersecting with the eastern terminus of CR 86-2 (Buttermilk Road) and the eastern terminus of CR 55 (Gooseneck Road) in Ashford. After CR 55, the routes bend northwest once again, crossing as a two-lane road through wide fields.

At Twichell Road, NY 240 and CR 32 make a large bend to the west, crossing through Ashford before turning northeast and northwest. On the northwestern stretch, the route remains rural, crossing an intersection with Bond Road, where the route turns north along West Valley Road. NY 240 and CR 32 continue north through Ashford, intersecting with Beech Tree Road, where they cross Cattaraugus Creek just west of the Bigelow Bridge. After crossing the bridge, NY 240 enters Erie County and the town of Concord.

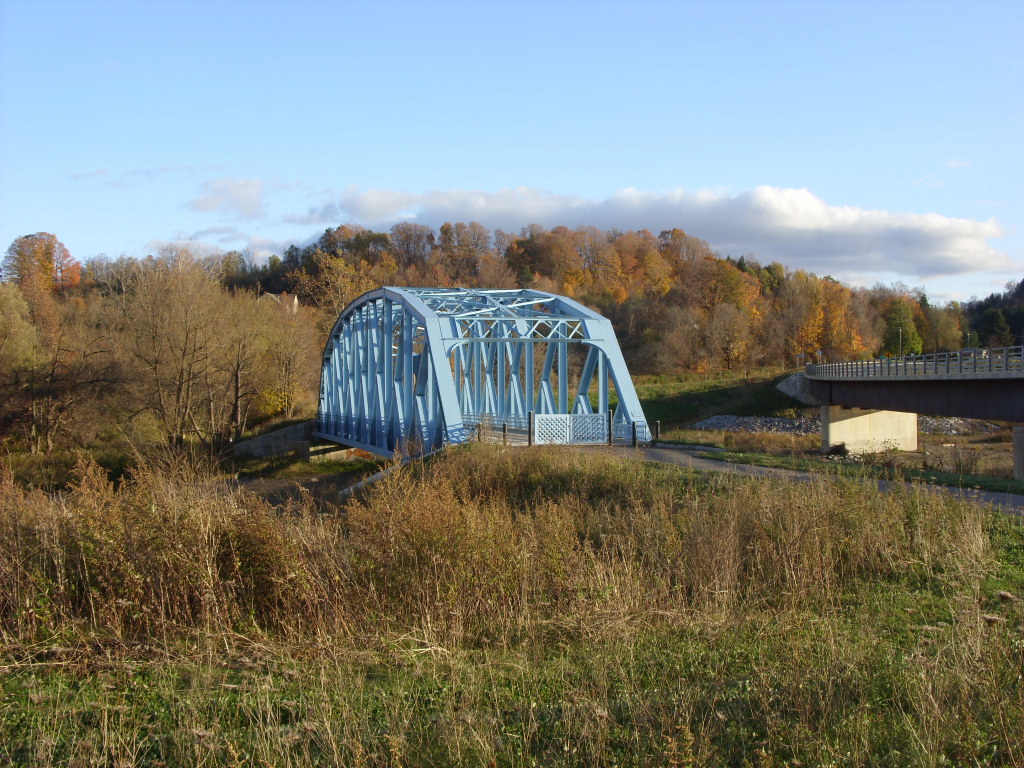
The former Bigelow Bridge just east of the current NY 240 span, post-bypassing in Concord

=== Erie County ===
==== Concord to Glenwood ====
Upon crossing into Erie County and the town of Concord, NY 240 remains county-maintained, now co-designated as unsigned CR 198. Now known as South Vaughn Street, the route proceeds northwest, intersecting with the eastern terminus of CR 62 (Cattaraugus Road). After this junction, NY 240 and CR 198 wind northeast through Concord as a two-lane rural road. The route bends northward, entering the village of Springville, where it intersects with NY 39 (East Main Street / Creek Road). After Springville, NY 240 and CR 198 re-enter the town of Concord, returning the two-lane rural roadway it was prior to entering Springville. Intersecting with the eastern terminus of CR 412 (North Street), the routes continue north through Concord, intersecting with CR 410 (Middle Road).

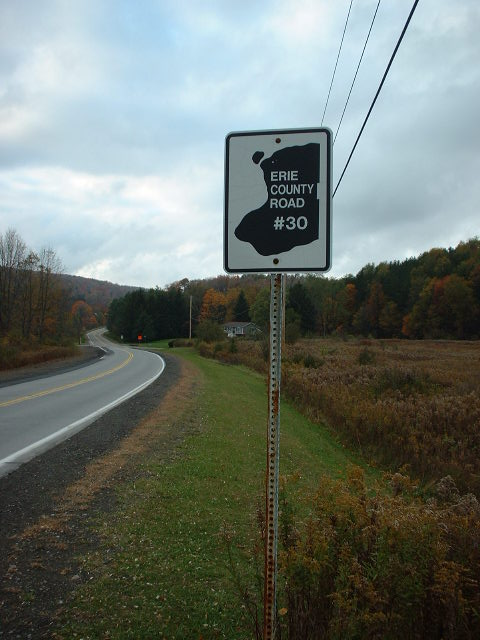
The lone CR 30 shield in Erie County, along NY 240 northbound in the town of Concord

NY 240 and CR 198 continue northward as a two-lane rural roadway in Concord, remaining with the moniker of Vaughn Street. More residences parallel the routes as they continue northward, entering a five-way intersection with CR 49, CR 490 (Genesee Road) and CR 432 (Sibley Road). This intersection serves as the northern terminus as CR 198, while NY 240 proceeds northeast as CR 27, now under the moniker of Allen Road. A short distance later, NY 240 intersects forks to the northwest on CR 30 as Glenwood–East Concord Road while CR 27 continues northeast on Allen Road. NY 240 and CR 30 proceed northward through Concord, soon bending northwest through dense fields before returning to railroad tracks nearby.

Crossing over the west branch of Cazenovia Creek, NY 240 and CR 30 continue north through Concord, bending northwest into an intersection with CR 563 (Foote Road). The routes bend northward through the hamlet of Footes, paralleling the creek and railroad track before entering the town of Colden. In Colden, NY 240 and CR 30 become a two-lane residential street surrounded by dense woods in the nearby hills. After another bend to the northwest, the routes enter the hamlet of Glenwood. In Glenwood, NY 240 intersects with the western terminus of CR 240 (Holland–Glenwood Road), which doubles as the northern terminus of CR 30, as NY 240 is state-maintained north of this junction.

==== Glenwood to Orchard Park ====
Paralleling the railroad tracks, NY 240 winds northwest through Colden as State Road, a two-lane road through dense woods. The woods changeover to wide fields as it winds northwest, passing west of Walter Kummer Town Park before entering the hamlet of Colden. In the hamlet, NY 240 intersects with the termini of CR 222 (Boston–Colden Road) and CR 562 (Heath Road). After this intersection, NY 240 darts several directions while winding northward as a two-lane residential street through the town of Colden. At the junction with CR 400 (Knapp Road), the route changes names to Davis Road before winding northeast into the hamlet of West Falls. Now in the town of Aurora, NY 240 runs along the creek as Davis Road, intersecting with the eastern terminus of CR 372 (Behm Road).

Continuing north through Aurora, NY 240 runs along the creek as a two-lane road, entering the hamlet of Jewettville. In Jewettville, the western terminus of CR 47 (Mill Road) intersects the residential NY 240. A short distance to the north, NY 240 turns west on Ellicott Road, remaining the two-lane residential road through the town of Aurora. After crossing the railroad tracks again, the route enters the hamlet of Loveland, within the town of Orchard Park. The route runs westward for several miles, intersecting with the northern terminus of CR 442 (Cole Road). Just west of CR 442, NY 240 enters a junction with CR 369 (South Freeman Road) and CR 371 (Scherff Road).

At this junction, NY 240 bends straight northwest, crossing through Orchard Park as a two-lane residential road. After Philson Street, the route makes a short bend to the west, intersecting with NY 277 (Chestnut Ridge Road). The right-of-way of NY 240 continues west as New Armor–Duells Road, reaching US 219 (the Southern Expressway) a short distance later. NY 240 turns north on a concurrency with NY 277, proceeding northeast through Orchard Park. After changing monikers to South Buffalo Street, NY 240 and NY 277 pass west of the Orchard Park Country Club and cross over a railroad line. After the railroad tracks, the routes enter downtown Orchard Park, becoming a two-lane commercial street before intersecting with US 20A (Quaker Street) in the center of the village.

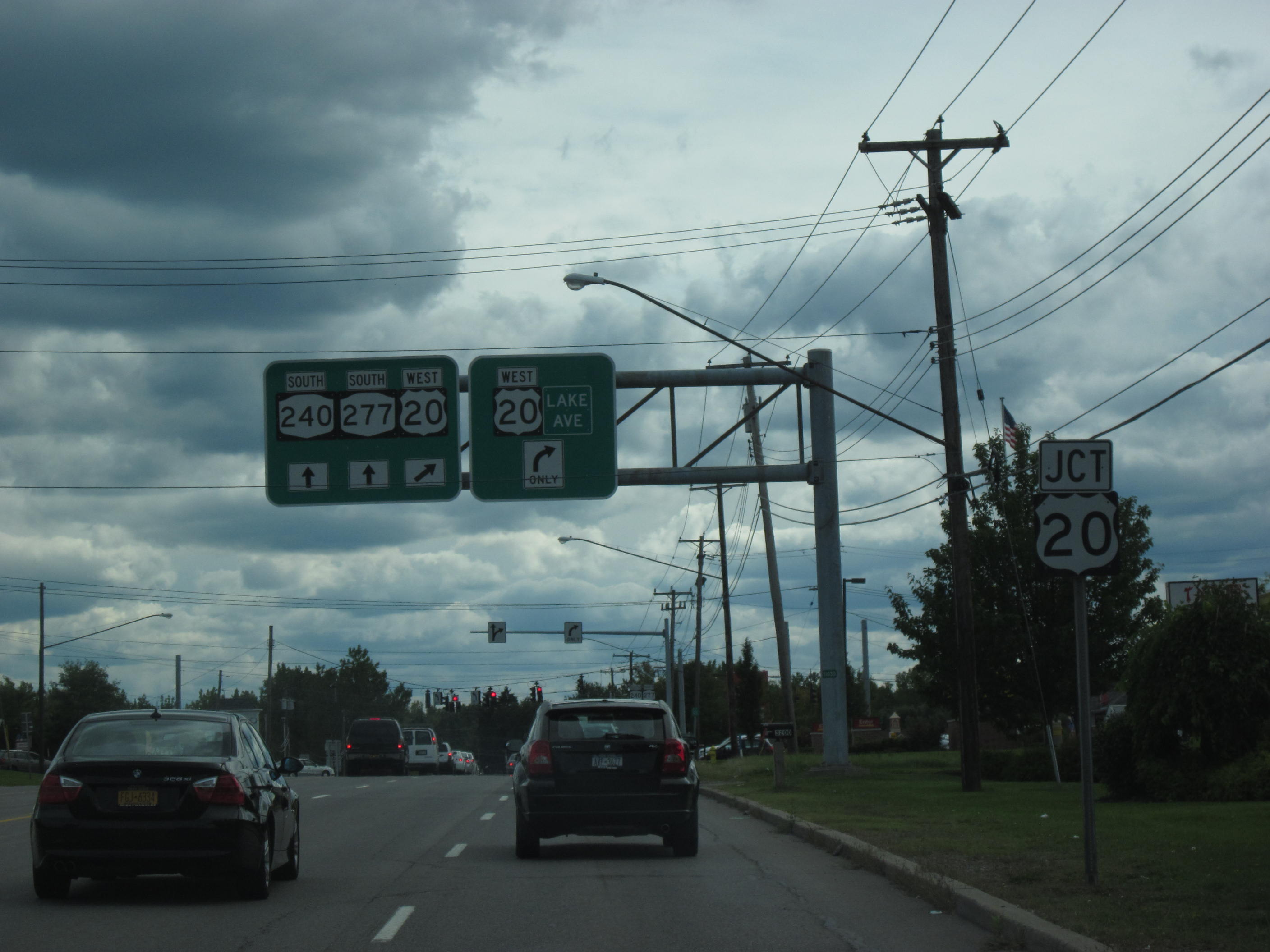
NY 240 and NY 277 southbound at US 20 and CR 200 in Orchard Park

==== Orchard Park to West Seneca ====
North of US 20A, NY 240 and NY 277 continue north along North Buffalo Road, intersecting with the eastern terminus of CR 177 (New Taylor Road). Crossing through the hamlet of Websters Corners, NY 240 and NY 277 bend northwest, intersecting with CR 369 once again. After another northward stint, the two routes intersect with CR 460 (Milestrip Road), which is the eastern continuation of NY 179. Now known as Orchard Park Road, NY 240 and NY 277 proceed north past residential homes as it intersects with US 20 (Southwestern Boulevard) and CR 200 (Lake Avenue).

Continuing north from US 20, NY 277 forks to the north along Union Road, while NY 240 proceeds northwest along Orchard Park Road. For a short distance, NY 240 serves as a two-lane commercial boulevard, switching over to a residential street at Dover Drive. Now in the town of West Seneca, NY 240 retains its Orchard Park Road moniker, passing several condominium complexes on both sides of the highway. Paralleling Cazenovia Creek once again, NY 240 enters another commercial section, intersecting with CR 137 (Ridge Road). Proceeding northwest again, NY 240 then crosses over a former railroad grade and a current railroad alignment near several industrial buildings.

At the intersection with Slade Avenue, NY 240 and Orchard Park Road turn north at Slade Road, which connects to the New York State Thruway's exit 55 at CR 137. NY 240 proceeds north through West Seneca, passing several residences and businesses before crossing over Cazenovia Creek into a large residential district. In this large residential district, NY 240 intersects with NY 16 (Seneca St), which connects to NY 400 (Aurora Expressway) a short distance to the east. NY 240 proceeds north as Harlem Road, paralleling the New York State Thruway just past exit 54, which serves as the northern terminus of NY 400. Crossing under NY 400, NY 240 crosses over more railroad tracks and intersects with CR 109 (Indian Church Road).

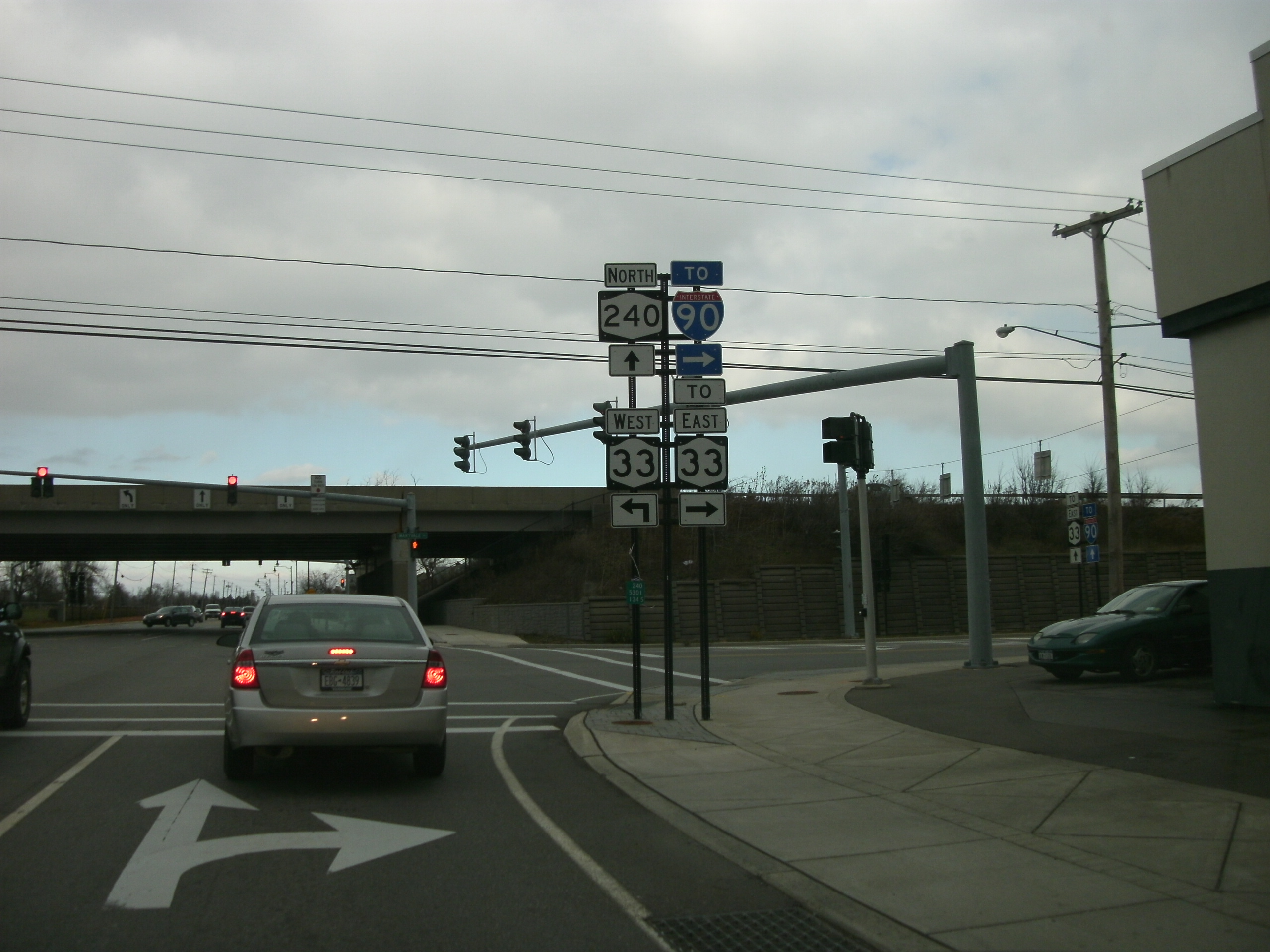
NY 240 northbound at the junction with NY 33 in Cheektowaga

==== West Seneca to Amherst ====
Proceeding north through West Seneca, NY 240 proceeds north, crossing an intersection with CR 534 (Mineral Springs Road). At this junction, the residential street turns over to commercial as NY 240 crosses over Buffalo Creek just west of the mouth of Cayuga Creek. After crossing over Buffalo Creek, NY 240 enters the town of Cheektowaga. In Cheektowaga, NY 240 immediately intersects with NY 354 (Clinton Street) before bending northeast around exit 53 of the Thruway. Just northeast of exit 53, NY 240 crosses under the Thruway mainline, intersecting with the western terminus of CR 315 (Dingens Street).

North of CR 315, NY 240 runs north through a large residential section of Cheektowaga, passing houses on both sides of the road for six blocks, including a junction with CR 207 (William Street). Passing just east of the village of Sloan, NY 240 proceeds northward along Harlem Road over a railroad yard owned by CSX Transportation. After crossing over the yard, NY 240 enters an interchange with NY 130 (Broadway) via two ramps. After crossing over NY 130, NY 240 crosses over another railroad yard, passing several large industries near an intersection with Walden Avenue. NY 240 continues north through Cheektowaga, remaining a two-lane residential boulevard, passing east of Cheektowaga Town Park.

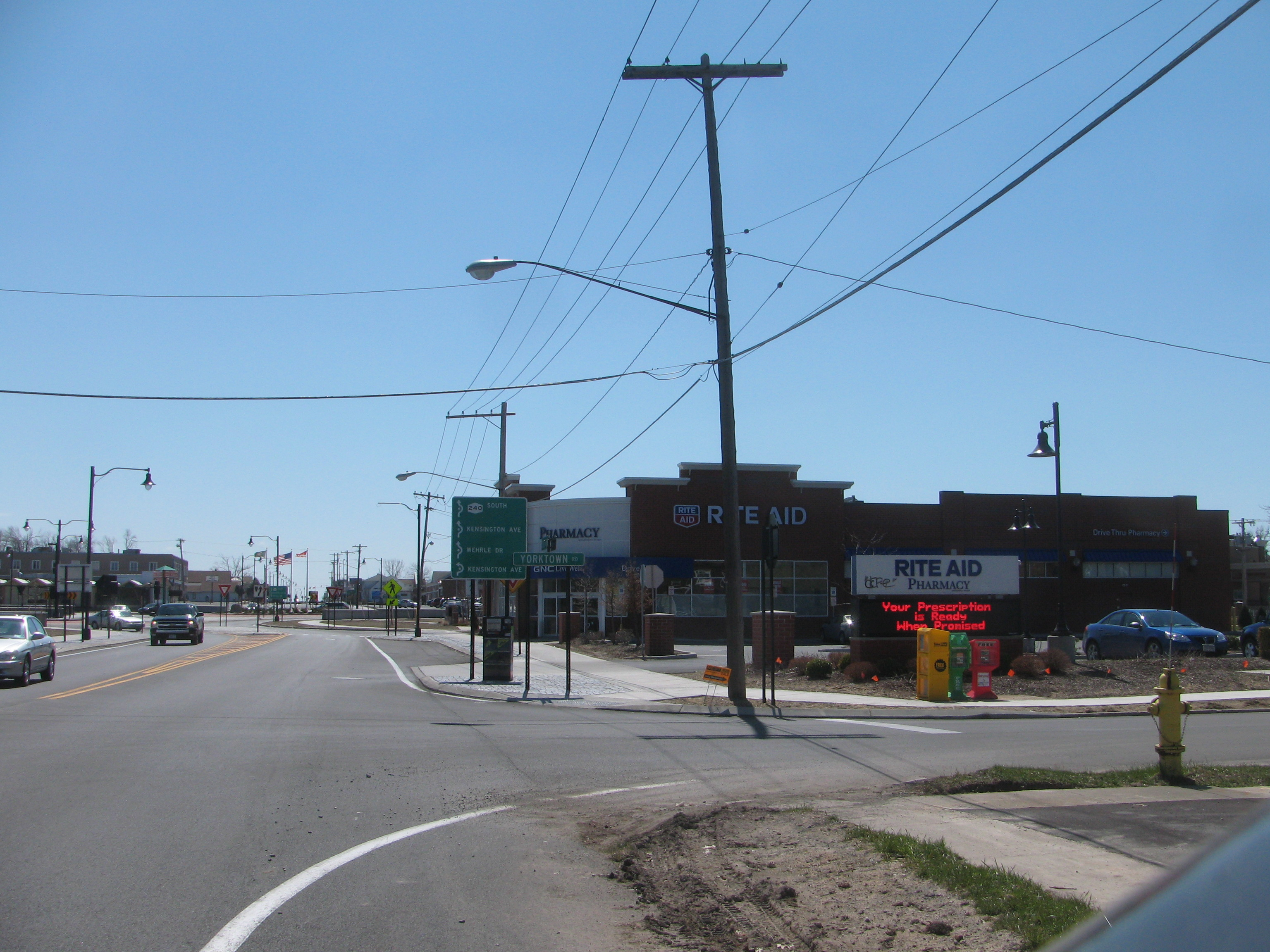
Rotaries along NY 240 near the Cheektowaga–Amherst town line

After crossing an intersection with Genesee Street, NY 240 continues north through Cheektowaga, passing east of Buffalo Cemetery and west of Pine Lawn Cemetery. A short distance north, the route passes east of Ridge Lawn Cemetery, crossing under NY 33 (the Kensington Expressway). Near the underpass, NY 240 intersects with several ramps from the expressway. After NY 33, the route passes east of Mount Calvary Cemetery before entering a large residential neighborhood. Continuing north through Cheektowaga, NY 240 becomes a two-lane residential street, intersecting with CR 141 (Cleveland Drive) at a rotary. Continuing northward, NY 240 enters the town of Amherst, where it enters two more rotaries, with CR 290 (Wehrle Drive) and CR 208 (Kensington Avenue).

NY 240 continues north through Amherst as a two-lane residential boulevard with the Harlem Road moniker. The route remains residential for several blocks, intersecting with NY 5 (Main Street). Passing east of the hamlet of Snyder, NY 240 passes several commercial businesses before becoming residential again north of that junction. The route remains residential for a distance to the intersection with Campus Lane, where it enters exit 6 of I-290 (the Youngmann Expressway). A block to the north of I-290, NY 240 intersects with NY 324 (Sheridan Drive). This intersection serves as the northern terminus of NY 240.

== History ==
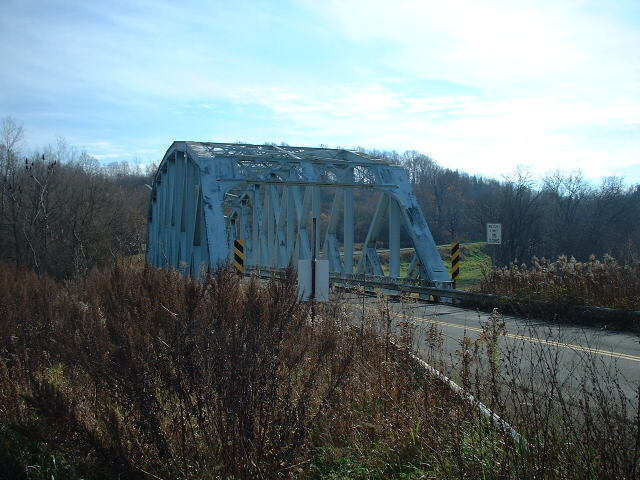
The Bigelow Bridge in Concord in 2003, before the span was bypassed to the west

NY 240 was assigned as part of the 1930 renumbering of state highways in New York to an alignment extending from NY 39 east of Springville to NY 18 southeast of downtown Buffalo. Instead of turning north onto Harlem Road as it does today, NY 240 continued northwest on Potter and Abbott Roads to South Park Avenue (then NY 18). At the time, the portion of modern NY 240 south of Cattaraugus Street in Springville was designated as part of NY 62 while the portion south of CR 16 in West Valley was also part of NY 242. NY 242 was moved onto its modern routing between Ashford and Machias by the following year while NY 62 was mostly renumbered to NY 75 c. 1932.

US 219 was extended into New York c. 1935, overlapping NY 75 between Ashford and Springville. The overlap with NY 75 was eliminated by 1940 when NY 75 was truncated northward to US 62 in Hamburg. In the mid-1950s, US 219 was shifted westward onto a new highway between Ellicottville and Springville; however, NY 240 was not extended south to Ashford over its former routing until the mid-1960s. In the Buffalo area, NY 240 was extended northwestward along South Park Avenue to Main Street, which carried NY 5 at the time, in the late 1930s. It was altered c. 1962 to follow Harlem Road across Cazenovia Creek to Seneca Street, where it ended at NY 16. NY 240 was extended northward along Harlem Road to NY 324 in Amherst in the mid-1960s. The portion of NY 240's former routing on Potter Road between the Buffalo city line and Harlem Road is now NY 950M, an unsigned reference route.

On July 6, 2014, the New York State Department of Transportation announced the extension of the Western New York Southtowns Scenic Byway, a scenic byway through Erie County from Orchard Park to Springville, into Cattaraugus County. The new extension would involve US 219 from NY 39 in Springville to the Great Valley town line and NY 240 down to NY 39 and NY 242.

== Major intersections ==
County	Location	mi	km	Destinations	Notes
Cattaraugus	Town of Ellicottville	0.00	0.00	NY 242	Southern terminus; hamlet of Ashford Junction
Erie	Springville	14.13	22.74	NY 39 – Gowanda, Arcade	
Erie	Town of Orchard Park	34.90	56.17	NY 277 south – Chestnut Ridge Park	Southern terminus of NY 240 / NY 277 overlap; hamlet of Duells Corner
Erie	Town of Orchard Park	34.90	56.17	NY 952J (New Armor Duells Road) to US 219 – Buffalo, Springville	Eastern terminus of unsigned NY 952J
Erie	Village of Orchard Park	36.20	58.26	US 20A (Quaker Street) to US 219	
Erie	Town of Orchard Park	38.26	61.57	US 20 (Southwestern Boulevard)	
Erie	Town of Orchard Park	38.51	61.98	NY 277 north (Union Road)	Northern terminus of NY 240 / NY 277 overlap
Erie	West Seneca	41.67	67.06	Potters Road (NY 950M)	Eastern terminus of unsigned NY 950M
Erie	West Seneca	42.24	67.98	NY 16 (Seneca Street) to NY 400	
Erie	West Seneca	44.22	71.17	NY 354 (Clinton Street)	
Erie	Cheektowaga	46.25	74.43	NY 130 (Broadway) – Buffalo, Depew	
Erie	Cheektowaga	46.73	75.20	Walden Avenue (NY 952Q)	
Erie	Cheektowaga	47.76	76.86	Genesee Street (NY 952A)	Formerly NY 33B
Erie	Cheektowaga	48.50	78.05	NY 33 to I-90	
Erie	Amherst	50.60	81.43	NY 5 (Main Street) to I-90	Hamlet of Snyder
Erie	Amherst	51.64	83.11	I-290 / NY 324 (Sheridan Drive)	Northern terminus; exit 6 (I-290)
1.000 mi = 1.609 km; 1.000 km = 0.621 mi: Concurrency terminus

== See also ==
- List of county routes in Cattaraugus County, New York
- List of county routes in Erie County, New York
