= Boston (hamlet), New York =

Hamlet in New York, United States

Coordinates: 42°37′44″N 78°44′15″W

Boston is a hamlet in the town of Boston in Erie County, New York, United States.
