= New York State Route 277 =

State highway in Erie County, New York, US

New York State Route 277
- Map of Erie County in western New York with NY 277 highlighted in red

Route information
- Maintained by NYSDOT
- Length: 21.40 mi (34.44 km)
- Existed: 1930–present

Major junctions
- South end: NY 391 in Boston
- US 20A in Orchard Park village; US 20 in Orchard Park town; NY 400 in West Seneca; NY 354 in West Seneca; NY 33 in Cheektowaga
- North end: NY 324 in Amherst

Location
- Country: United States
- State: New York
- Counties: Erie

Highway system
- New York Highways; Interstate; US; State; Reference; Parkways
← NY 276	→ I-278
← NY 18A	NY 18B	→ NY 18D

New York State Route 277 (NY 277) is a state highway in New York in the United States. This highway is also called Union Road, along with other names. NY 277 is a major north–south road east of Buffalo, New York, through the middle of Erie County. The section of NY 277 north of Orchard Park used to be New York State Route 18B until the portion of NY 18 south of Niagara Falls was deleted on January 1, 1962.

== Route description ==
=== North Boston to West Seneca ===
NY 277 begins at an intersection with NY 391 (Boston State Road) in the hamlet of North Boston (in the town of Boston). Running northeast along Herman Hill Road, NY 277 is a two-lane local road, passing the North Boston Stadium, crossing a junction with South Abbott Road (County Route 28 or CR 28) before becoming a dense woods road into the town of Orchard Park and changing names to Boston Ridge Road. Returning to a residential road, the route turns eastward south Chestnut Ridge Park, reaching a junction with Chestnut Ridge Road (CR 552), where NY 277 turns northward.

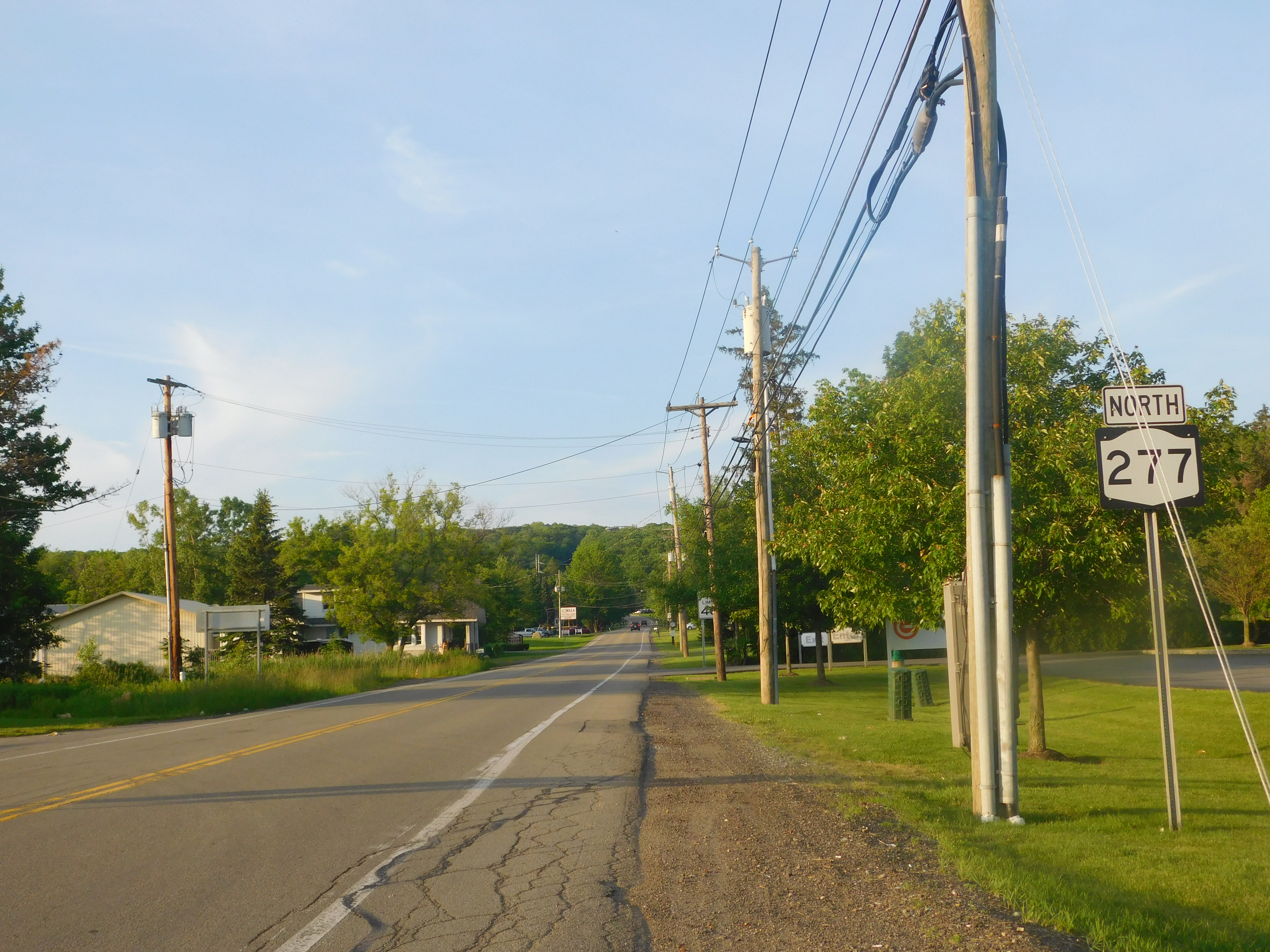
NY 277 north of NY 391 in North Boston

Running along the southeastern edge of Chestnut Ridge Park, NY 277 becomes a two-lane residential street through Orchard Park, crossing north past Gartman Road (CR 529). Continuing north, the route crosses into Chestnut Ridge Park, reaching an interchange with Sheriff Drive in the park. A short distance north of Sheriff Drive, the route leaves the park, reaching the eastern terminus of Newton Road (CR 110). Returning to the residential neighborhoods, NY 277 bypasses the hamlet of Ellicott, which is connected via Powers Road (CR 370). Just south of the border with the village of Orchard Park, NY 277 reaches the hamlet of Duells Corner, where the route junctions with NY 240 (New Armor Duells Road).

Now in the village of Orchard Park, NY 277 and NY 240 become concurrent, passing west of the Orchard Park Country Club as South Buffalo Street. Passing east of Yates Park and Green Lake, the routes cross under a railroad line owned by Buffalo and Pittsburgh Railroad and soon reach the center of Orchard Park. The routes pass west of Woodlawn Cemetery, becoming a two-lane commercial street into a junction with US 20A (Quaker Street). Now known as North Buffalo Road, NY 277 and NY 240 continue north, crossing through the village as a two-lane commercial road. Crossing back into the town of Orchard Park, the routes enter the hamlet of Webster Corners and intersect with the termini of CR 103 and CR 369.

A short distance to the north, the routes, now a residential road, cross a junction with Milestrip Road (CR 460), the county-maintained continuation of NY 179. Now known as Orchard Park Road, NY 277 and NY 240 continue north through Orchard Park before reaching a junction with US 20 (Southwestern Boulevard) in front of a large strip mall. Just north of the junction with US 20, NY 240 and NY 277 enter Harold Square and split at a fork, with NY 240 running northwest along Orchard Park and NY 277 running north on Union Road. NY 277 soon crosses into the town of West Seneca and becomes a four-lane residential street.

=== West Seneca to Amherst ===
NY 277 crosses north past a junction with Reserve Road (CR 366) and East and West Road (CR 363) before passing the Houghton University at West Seneca. NY 277 then crosses over Cazenovia Creek and enters the commercial hamlet of Ebenezer, where it intersects with Seneca Street (CR 215). Continuing north through the town of West Seneca, passing east of Centennial Park and entering a junction with NY 16 (Center Road). Passing Mount Hope Cemetery, the route goes north several blocks into an interchange with NY 400 (the Aurora Expressway) before crossing over tracks owned by Norfolk Southern.

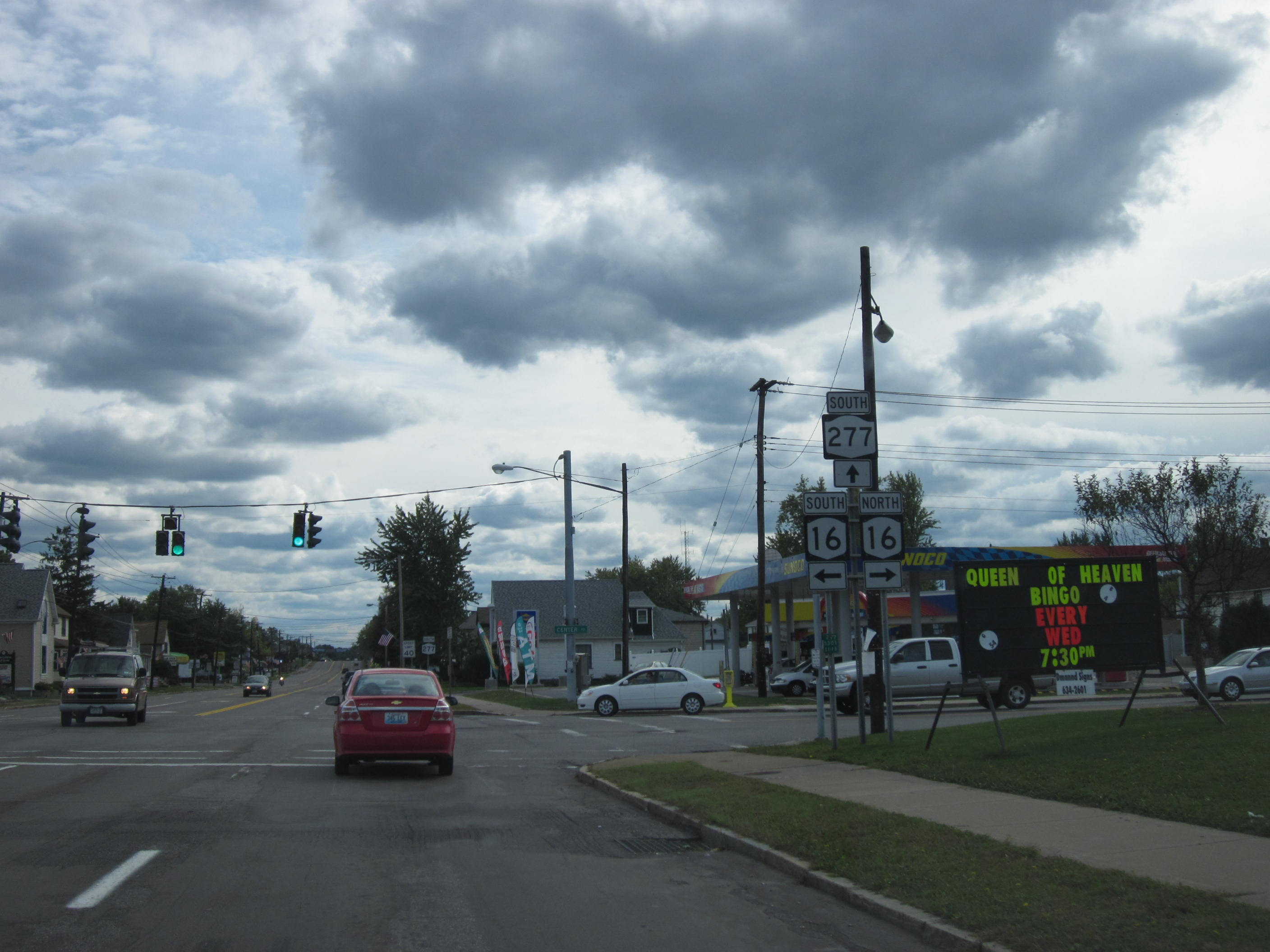
NY 277 at the junction with NY 16 in West Seneca

After the tracks, NY 277 becomes an industrial roadway along Union Road, before entering the hamlet of Gardenville, where it intersects with the eastern terminus of Indian Church Road (CR 534) near the Charles Burchfield Nature and Art Center. After crossing over Buffalo Creek, NY 277 reaches a junction with NY 354 (Clinton Street). NY 277 continues north along Union Road through Gardenville as a four-lane residential street. The route soon enters the town of Cheektowaga, where it becomes a four-lane industrial street near French Road (CR 321) through south Cheektowaga. The route soon becomes a residential boulevard as it winds north through Cheektowaga, crossing another creek into the Edgebrook Estates neighborhood.

Running north through Edgebrook Estates, NY 277 passes a long strip mall on the northbound side, soon crossing under tracks owned by Norfolk Southern, crossing into the Bellevue section of Cheektowaga. After a two-quadrant interchange with NY 130 (Broadway), the route crosses under tracks owned by CSX Transportation and used by Amtrak, just west of the Buffalo-Depew Amtrak station. NY 277 continues north through Cheektowaga, crossing a junction with Walden Avenue (NY 952Q), an unsigned reference route. The route then runs east of the entrances to the Walden Galleria and crosses through the commercial Maryvale section of Cheektowaga.

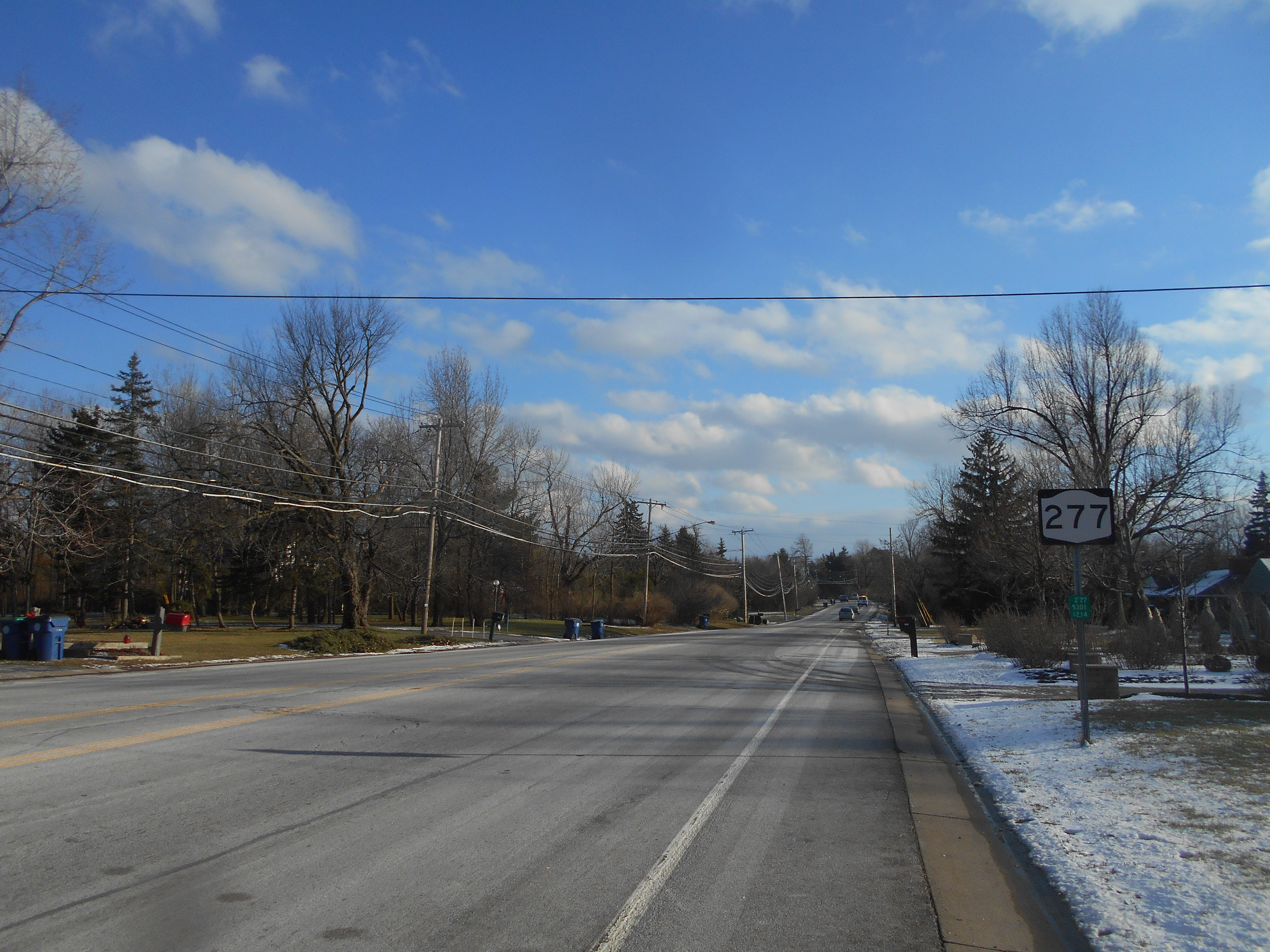
NY 277 southbound from NY 324 in Amherst

North of an abandoned railroad grade, NY 277 and Union Road become a four-lane residential boulevard through Maryvale, crossing a junction with Genesee Street and soon into an interchange with NY 33 (the Kensington Expressway). North of the Kensington, NY 277 remains a four-lane boulevard through U-Crest and Maryvale, passing numerous residences on its way north into the town of Amherst. After crossing a junction with Wehrle Drive (CR 290), NY 277, known now as South Union Road, crosses under the New York State Thruway (I-90) just east of exit 50 and west of the Williamsville toll barrier, now in the village of Williamsville.

In Williamsville, NY 277 remains a four-lane residential boulevard, crossing a junction with NY 5 (Main Street). At this junction, NY 277 becomes known as North Union Road, reducing to two lanes as it passes more residences in Williamsville. Just north of North Forest Park, the route turns northwest and returns to the town of Amherst. Now known as North Forest Road, the route winds northwest past multiple residences before reaching a junction with NY 324 (Sheridan Drive). The junction with NY 324 marks the northern terminus of NY 277, while North Forest Road continues north as CR 294 past Westwood Country Club.

== History ==
In the 1930 renumbering of state highways in New York, the portion of Union Road between NY 354 in Gardenville and Genesee Street (then NY 33) in Cheektowaga was designated as part of NY 355, a route that continued north to Williamsville by way of Genesee Street and Cayuga Road. At the same time, the section of Union Road in northern Orchard Park was designated as part of NY 240. NY 277, meanwhile, was assigned during the year to the portion of its modern routing from Boston north to NY 240 south of the village of Orchard Park.

The Union Road portion of NY 355 was incorporated into NY 18B c. 1935. The suffixed route was an alternate route of NY 18 that began at NY 240 in Orchard Park and followed what is now NY 277 north to Sheridan Drive (NY 324). From there, NY 18B followed NY 324 west to Bailey Avenue, where it connected to NY 18. NY 355 was truncated northward to the eastern terminus of its overlap with NY 33 as a result. The NY 355 designation was completely removed c. 1937. NY 18 was truncated to Lewiston on its western end on January 1, 1962, leading to the removal of the NY 18B designation. The portion of the route's former alignment that did not overlap NY 324 became a northward extension of NY 277.

== Major intersections ==
The entire route is in Erie County.

Location	mi	km	Destinations	Notes
Boston	0.00	0.00	NY 391 north (Boston State Road) to US 219 – Hamburg	Southern terminus; Hamlet of North Boston; southern terminus of NY 391
Town of Orchard Park	5.27	8.48	NY 240 south (New Armor Duells Road)	Southern terminus of NY 240 / NY 277 overlap
Town of Orchard Park	5.27	8.48	NY 952J (New Armor Mills Road) to US 219 – Buffalo, Springville	Eastern terminus of unsigned NY 952J
Village of Orchard Park	6.57	10.57	US 20A (Quaker Street) to US 219	
Town of Orchard Park	8.63	13.89	US 20 (Southwestern Boulevard)	
Town of Orchard Park	8.88	14.29	NY 240 north (Orchard Park Road) to New York Thruway	Northern terminus of NY 240 / NY 277 overlap
West Seneca	11.63	18.72	NY 16 (Center Road)	
West Seneca	11.90	19.15	NY 400 (Aurora Expressway) to I-90 – East Aurora	Interchange
West Seneca	12.71	20.45	NY 354 (Clinton Street)	
Cheektowaga			NY 130 (Broadway)	Two-quadrant interchange
Cheektowaga	16.31	26.25	Walden Avenue (NY 952Q)	
Cheektowaga	17.69	28.47	Genesee Street (NY 952A)	Former NY 33B
Cheektowaga	17.90	28.81	NY 33 (Kensington Expressway) to I-90	Interchange
Williamsville	20.03	32.24	NY 5 (Main Street)	
Amherst	21.40	34.44	NY 324 (Sheridan Drive)	Northern terminus
1.000 mi = 1.609 km; 1.000 km = 0.621 mi: Concurrency terminus
