= U.S. Route 219 in New York =

Section of U.S. Route in New York

U.S. Route 219
- US 219 highlighted in red; US 219 Business in blue (Concurrency with NY 417 in lighter blue, section maintained as NY 954T in darker blue)

Route information
- Maintained by NYSDOT
- Length: 67.63 mi (108.84 km)
- Existed: c. 1935–present

Major junctions
- South end: US 219 at the Pennsylvania state line in Bradford, PA
- I-86 / NY 17 in Salamanca; US 20A in Orchard Park
- North end: I-90 / New York Thruway in West Seneca

Location
- Country: United States
- State: New York
- Counties: Cattaraugus, Erie

Highway system
- United States Numbered Highway System; List; Special; Divided; New York Highways; Interstate; US; State; Reference; Parkways
← NY 218	→ NY 219

U.S. Route 219 (US 219) is a part of the U.S. Highway System that runs from Rich Creek, Virginia, to West Seneca, New York. In the U.S. state of New York, US 219 extends 67.63 miles (108.84 km) from the Pennsylvania state line at Carrollton to an interchange with the New York State Thruway (Interstate 90 or I-90) at exit 55 in West Seneca, southeast of downtown Buffalo. In Cattaraugus County, the area surrounding US 219 is predominantly rural. However, in northern Cattaraugus County, US 219 becomes a freeway leading through Erie County and into the heart of Buffalo. The route serves the villages of Ellicottville and Springville, where it meets New York State Route 242 (NY 242) and NY 39, respectively, and indirectly serves Hamburg via NY 391.

The path of US 219 in New York mostly follows that of New York State Route 62, a route assigned in the 1930 renumbering of state highways in New York that extended from Great Valley north to Buffalo via Ellicottville, the hamlet of Ashford, Springville, and Hamburg. From Ellicottville to Springville, NY 62 utilized modern NY 242 and NY 240. It was renumbered to NY 75 c. 1932, and became part of US 219 from Hamburg south when the U.S. Highway was extended into New York c. 1935. The section north of Ellicottville has been realigned in the years since to follow a two-lane road from Ellicottville to Springville and the Southern Expressway from Springville to West Seneca. Long-term plans for the expressway call for it to extend from West Seneca south to Salamanca.

== Route description ==
=== Cattaraugus County ===
US 219 crosses the New York–Pennsylvania border at Carrollton. The road begins by heading northward towards the Southern Tier Expressway, paralleling Tunungwant Creek. Just after the Pennsylvania border, East Main Street becomes Hillside Drive and soon after Old U.S. Route 219 as it parallels US 219 for a short time. The road quickly merges into the current alignment as the U.S. route enters the hamlet of Limestone. A second incarnation of Old Route 219 parallels the U.S. route throughout Limestone. The road merges in just north of Limestone and US 219 continues northward. South Nine Mile Road (County Route 30 or CR 30) leaves to the right just before the road merges into the Southern Tier Expressway (I-86 and NY 17). Also present at this intersection is US 219 Business. The three roads overlap for six miles (10 km) until exit 21, where US 219 leaves the Southern Tier Expressway in Salamanca.

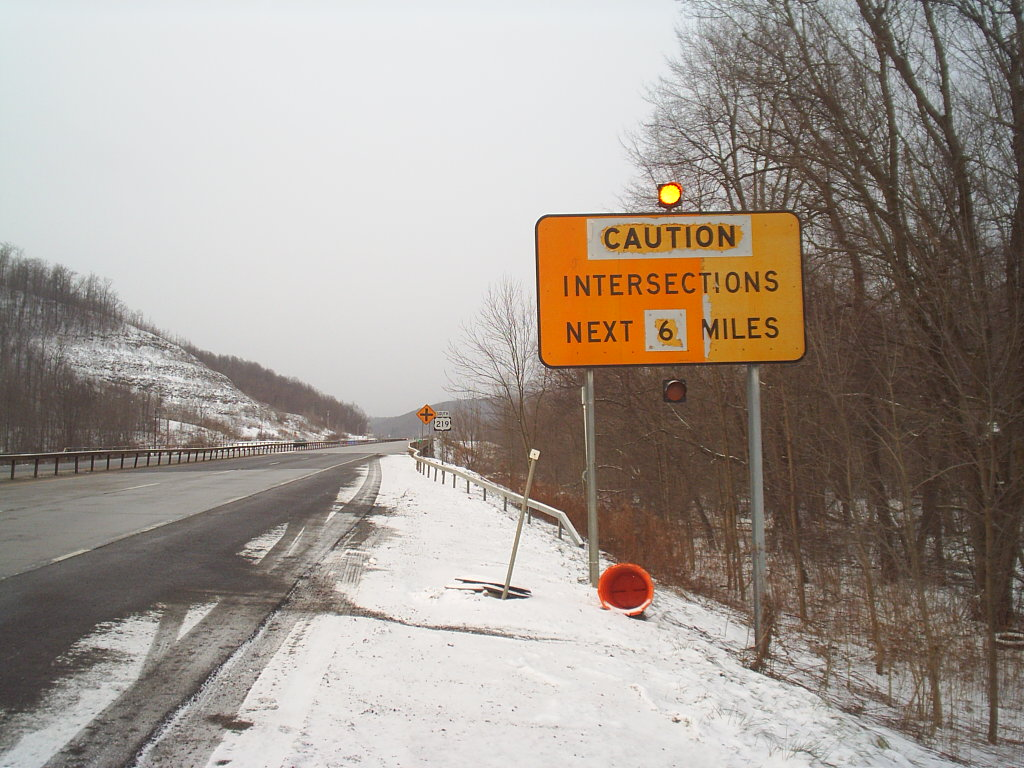
Southbound on US 219 in Limestone. At right, a sign indicates that the road has at-grade intersections for the next 6 miles (9.7 km).

US 219 crosses through the city of Salamanca and heads north towards Ellicottville. While in Salamanca, US 219 and NY 417 become concurrent for about one mile (1.6 km). At the end of the concurrency comes the end of the business route. CR 49 terminates just north of Salamanca as US 219 enters Peth. In Peth, CR 67 leaves to the right. In Great Valley, NY 98 leaves to the north. US 219 enters Ellicottville and intersects with NY 242. The two roads become concurrent for a short distance when US 219 turns to the north. Several Cattaraugus County roads intersect in the distance from Ellicottville to the Erie County border. The first is CR 75, the second is a concurrency between CR 53 and CR 85, and the third is CR 12, which has a brief concurrency with US 219 before leaving to the east. After an intersection with CR 77, US 219 has a brief concurrency with CR 85 before it becomes a freeway and crosses Cattaraugus Creek as it enters Erie County.

=== Erie County ===
US 219 is a freeway for its entire length in Erie County. About 2 miles (3 km) from the county line, US 219 connects to NY 39 at an interchange west of the village of Springville. The highway continues to the northwest, connecting to CR 49 (Genesee Road) 3 miles (5 km) later and CR 233 (Rice Road) after another 6 miles (10 km). Five miles later, US 219 encounters NY 391 in Creekside.

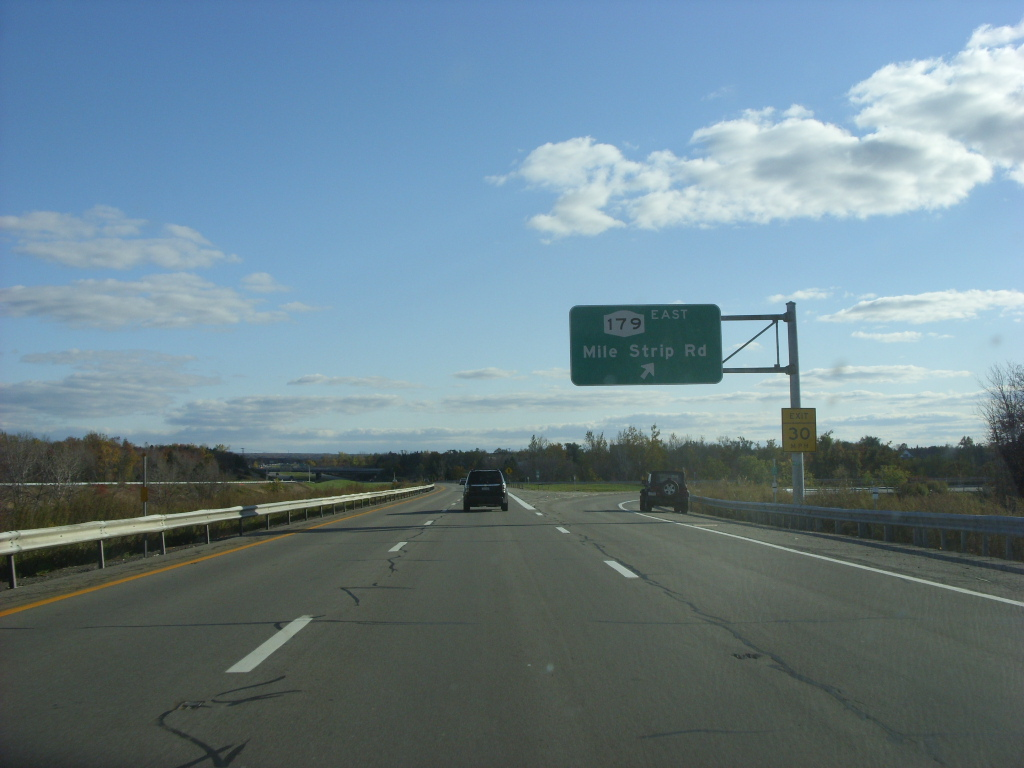
US 219 southbound at the interchange with NY 179 (Mile Strip Road) in Orchard Park

The route continues, connecting to CR 44 (New Armor Duells Road), a highway leading to NY 240 in the village of Orchard Park. Not far to the north is the next interchange with US 20A, which provides access to nearby Highmark Stadium. North of the village but still in the town of Orchard Park, US 219 crosses over US 20 prior to meeting NY 179 at an interchange just north of the US 20 overpass. The highway continues, curving to the northwest as it enters West Seneca and approaches the New York State Thruway (I-90). Instead of immediately merging with the Thruway, US 219 runs parallel to the Thruway for roughly 1 mile (1.6 km), with the northbound lanes running alongside the east side of the Thruway and the southbound lanes running alongside the west side. The two highways share an interchange with Ridge Road before US 219 finally merges into the Thruway.

== History ==
=== Origins and designation ===
When the first set of posted routes in New York were assigned in 1924, NY 18 was assigned to an alignment extending from the Pennsylvania state line north of Bradford to downtown Buffalo. NY 18 went north from the state line to Bradford Junction, where it intersected NY 17 (now NY 417), another route assigned in 1924. The two routes converged here and overlapped each other northwest to Salamanca, where NY 17 continued westward toward Jamestown while NY 18 proceeded northwestward toward Little Valley. NY 18 originally connected to PA 6 at the state line; however, by 1929, it connected to US 219 instead. In the 1930 renumbering of state highways in New York, the highway connecting NY 17 and NY 18 in Salamanca to Great Valley was designated as part of NY 98. Assigned at the same time was NY 62, a route extending from Great Valley to NY 18 in downtown Buffalo by way of Ellicottville, Ashford, Springville, and Hamburg.

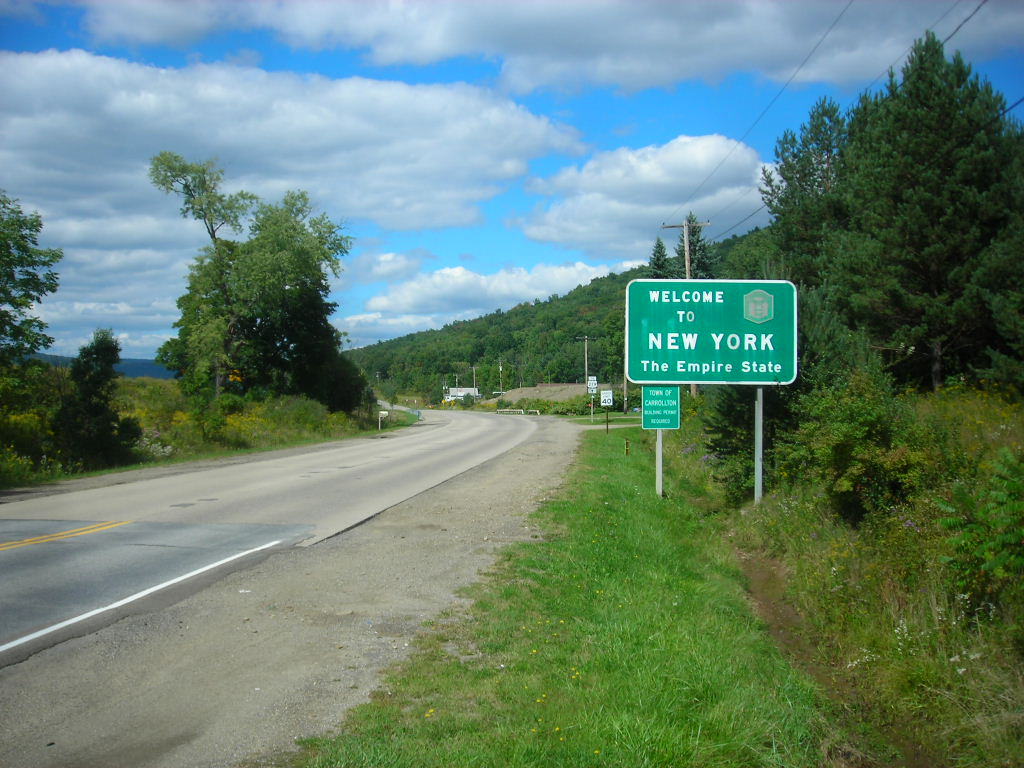
East Main Street in Carollton (former US 219) crossing the New York state line from Pennsylvania

US 62 was extended into New York c. 1932; as a result, the portion of NY 62 south of Athol Springs was renumbered to NY 75 to eliminate numerical duplication with the new U.S. Highway. The remainder of old NY 62 became part of an extended NY 5. US 219 was extended into New York c. 1935, overlapping NY 18, NY 98, and NY 75 northward to a junction with US 62 in Hamburg. The overlap with NY 75 was eliminated by 1940 when NY 75 was truncated northward to US 62 in Hamburg. The other two overlaps ceased to exist c. 1962 when NY 18 and NY 98 were truncated to Lewiston and Great Valley, respectively.

=== Realignments ===
When it was first extended into New York, US 219 continued north from Ellicottville to Springville as it does today; however, it initially overlapped NY 242 between Ellicottville and Ashford and utilized what is now NY 240 between Ashford and Cattaraugus Street southeast of Springville. Within Springville, US 219 was routed along Cattaraugus Street and Buffalo Street and intersected NY 39 in the village center. Outside of the village, US 219 went north on Springville–Boston Road and Boston State Road to North Boston, from where US 219 continued to Hamburg by way of modern NY 391.

In the early 1950s, construction began on a western bypass of Springville that connected US 219 just north of the village to East Otto Road 6 miles (10 km) south of Springville. The portion of the highway north of Waverly Street was completed by 1954. The remainder of the bypass was finished by 1956, at which time US 219 was realigned to follow the bypass around the village. At the south end of the bypass, US 219 continued south to Ellicottville by way of pre-existing, previously unnumbered highways. However, the segment of modern NY 240 vacated by US 219 did not become part of an extended NY 240 until the mid-1960s. In the 1990s, US 219 was rerouted to follow the Southern Tier Expressway between exit 21 in Salamanca and exit 23 just south of Bradford Junction. The old alignment of US 219 through Carrollton and Salamanca became US 219 Business.

=== Southern Expressway ===
Construction began in the early 1970s on the Southern Expressway, a freeway connecting Buffalo to Springville. The first segment of the expressway—between the New York State Thruway east of Lackawanna and US 20A west of Orchard Park—opened to traffic by 1973 as a realignment of US 219. In between the end of the expressway and North Boston, US 219 temporarily overlapped US 20A and NY 277. The freeway was extended south to North Boston in the mid-1970s and to Springville in the early 1980s. Both segments became part of US 219 upon opening. The former surface routing of US 219 between North Boston and Hamburg was redesignated as NY 391 following the completion of the expressway's first segment in the early 1970s while the remainder of US 219's former routing south to Springville was transferred to Erie County upon the completion of the entire Springville–Buffalo segment of the Southern Expressway.

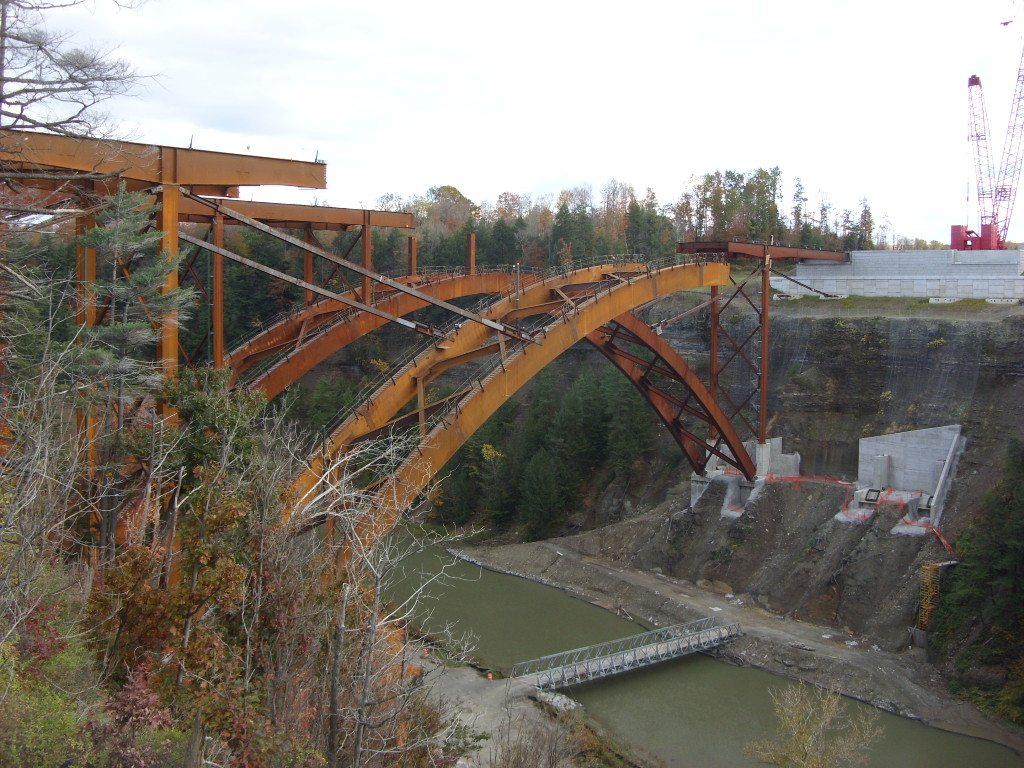
2008 photo of the twin arch bridges that carry the Southern Expressway over Cattaraugus Creek. Both were still under construction at this time.

Plans to extend the Southern Expressway southward from NY 39 in Springville to Peters Road in Ashford, a distance of 4.2 miles (6.8 km), had been in development for years before they were finally put into action in the mid-2000s. Project specifications called for the installation of a four-lane right-of-way (two lanes in each direction) and the construction of 11 bridges, including twin bridges over Cattaraugus Creek. The number was later revised to nine. Areas near parts of the new freeway were to become a 41-acre (17 ha) wetland habitat. A portion of NY 39 near the current southern terminus was also reconstructed in 2007 and 2008 to accommodate for the completed interchange with US 219.

The rights to the project were awarded to Cold Spring Construction on January 26, 2007, with work commencing on June 1. Altogether, the project was initially expected to cost $86 million and be completed in late 2009. The lengthy construction time was largely due to the need to construct two bridges over the Zoar Valley gorge. As of March 2009, the projected cost of the extension had risen to $116 million. Since 2007, the project had encountered several delays due to landslides in the vicinity of Scoby Hill Road and the need to conduct a second environmental impact study on the road's impact on wetlands in the area. As a result, the $86 million in state funding that was devoted to the project was reallocated to other projects in New York, a move confirmed by the New York State Department of Transportation (NYSDOT) in March 2009. At the same time, however, NYSDOT left open the possibility of eventually restoring the funding. It was restored sometime afterward, and the highway was completed on November 19, 2010, with a total price tag of $125 million.

Ownership and maintenance of the former surface alignment of US 219 north of Peters Road—now known as Miller Road, and including the two-lane, high-level bridge that currently carries it across the valley surrounding Cattaraugus Creek—was transferred from the state of New York to Erie and Cattaraugus counties. The two sections of road leading to and from the bridge were transferred immediately while the bridge itself was not turned over until a state-funded rehabilitation project was completed in 2013. The latter half of the plan drew criticism from Erie County officials who believe that the state should continue to maintain the bridge due to its size, importance and the resulting cost of upkeep. Because of safety concerns, the bridge was closed to traffic on January 5, 2012 and remained closed until April of that year while repairs were made to the structure. The section of US 219 between the Cattaraugus County line and Waverly Street in Springville became County Route 581. The section in Cattaraugus County became County Route 100.

On July 6, 2014, the New York State Department of Transportation announced the extension of the Western New York Southtowns Scenic Byway, a scenic byway through Erie County from Orchard Park to Springville, into Cattaraugus County. The new extension would involve US 219 from NY 39 in Springville to the Great Valley town line and NY 240 down to NY 39 and NY 242.

== Future ==
Long-term plans call for the Southern Expressway to be extended southward to the Southern Tier Expressway (I-86 and NY 17) in Salamanca. Planning wise, this section comprises four segments of the Southern Expressway, with the first five completed segments reaching from south of Springville to West Seneca. Construction of the remainder of the freeway has been delayed by two major factors: the inability to obtain rights from the Seneca nation that would allow the highway to go through the Allegany Reservation, and the lack of funding due to the state's financial woes. Work on the proposed highway's environmental impact study was suspended indefinitely in June 2009 as a result of the latter. NYSDOT intends to resume work on the study when the state's financial situation improves and funding can be restored to the project.

== Major intersections ==
County	Location	mi	km	Exit	Destinations	Notes
Cattaraugus	Carrollton	0.00	0.00		US 219 south – Bradford	Continuation into Pennsylvania
Cattaraugus	Carrollton	6.29	10.12	Southern end of freeway section		
Cattaraugus	Carrollton	6.29	10.12	23	I-86 east / NY 17 east / US 219 Bus. north – Olean, Binghamton	Southern end of I-86/NY 17 concurrency; southern terminus of US 219 Bus.
Cattaraugus	City of Salamanca	13.43– 13.59	21.61– 21.87	21	I-86 west / NY 17 west / NY 417 west – Jamestown, Erie, PA, Salamanca Business District	Northern end of I-86/NY 17 concurrency; southern end of NY 417 concurrency
Cattaraugus	City of Salamanca	13.43– 13.59	21.61– 21.87	Northern end of freeway section		
Cattaraugus	City of Salamanca	14.29	23.00		NY 417 east / US 219 Bus. south – Olean	Northern end of NY 417 concurrency; northern terminus of US 219 Bus.
Cattaraugus	Great Valley	19.55	31.46		NY 98 north – Franklinville	Southern terminus of NY 98
Cattaraugus	Village of Ellicottville	24.34	39.17		NY 242 west – Little Valley	Southern end of NY 242 concurrency
Cattaraugus	Town of Ellicottville	25.35	40.80		NY 242 east – Machias	Northern end of NY 242 concurrency
Cattaraugus	Ashford	39.43	63.46		CR 101 (Peters Road)	
Cattaraugus	Ashford	39.43	63.46	Southern end of freeway section		
Erie	Springville	42.67	68.67		NY 39 – Springville	
Erie	Concord	45.81	73.72		Genesee Road – Concord	
Erie	Boston	52.37	84.28		Rice Road – Colden	
Erie	Boston	57.11	91.91		NY 391 (Boston State Road) – Boston, Hamburg	Hamlet of North Boston
Erie	Town of Orchard Park	61.21	98.51		New Armor Duells Road (NY 952J) – Chestnut Ridge Park	
Erie	Town of Orchard Park	62.25	100.18		US 20A – Orchard Park	
Erie	Town of Orchard Park	64.04	103.06		NY 179 (Milestrip Road)	
Erie	West Seneca				I-90 Toll west / New York Thruway west – Erie	Southbound exit and northbound entrance; exit 55 on I-90 / Thruway
Erie	West Seneca	67.12	108.02		Ridge Road – West Seneca, Lackawanna	
Erie	West Seneca	67.63	108.84		I-90 east / New York Thruway east – Buffalo, Niagara Falls	Northern terminus; exit 55 on I-90 / Thruway
1.000 mi = 1.609 km; 1.000 km = 0.621 mi: Electronic toll collection

== See also ==
U.S. Route 219
Previous state: Pennsylvania	New York	Next state: Terminus
