= Creekside, New York =

Hamlet in New York, United States

Coordinates: 42°41′30″N 78°46′58″W

Creekside is a hamlet in the town of Boston in Erie County, New York, United States.
