= West Falls, New York =

Hamlet in New York, United States

Coordinates: 42°42′05″N 78°40′56″W

West Falls is a hamlet in the town of Aurora in Erie County, New York, United States. It is part of the Buffalo-Niagara Falls metropolitan area.

New York State Route 240 passes through the hamlet.

The hamlet is covered by the East Aurora Union Free School District. The former West Falls Elementary School closed in 1983.

The hamlet is home to the West Falls - Colden Community Library.
