= Orchard Park (village), New York =

Orchard Park, New York
- Village
- Seal

- Location in Erie County and the state of New York
- Coordinates: 42°45′44″N 78°44′29″W
- Country: United States
- State: New York
- County: Erie
- Town: Orchard Park
- Incorporated: 1921

Government
  - Mayor: Jo Ann Litwin Clinton

Area
  - Total: 1.39 sq mi (3.59 km^{2})
  - Land: 1.34 sq mi (3.48 km^{2})
  - Water: 0.042 sq mi (0.11 km^{2})
- Elevation: 863 ft (263 m)

Population (2020)
  - Total: 3,108
  - Density: 2,313.7/sq mi (893.34/km^{2})
- Time zone: UTC-5 (Eastern (EST))
  - Summer (DST): UTC-4 (EDT)
- ZIP code: 14127
- Area code: 716
- FIPS code: 36-55266
- GNIS feature ID: 2391038
- Website: orchardparkvillageny.gov

Orchard Park is a village in Erie County, New York, United States. The population was 3,246 at the 2010 census. The name is derived from a description of the local landscape, which abounded with orchards. It is part of the Buffalo-Niagara Falls metropolitan area.

The village of Orchard Park lies north of the center of the town of Orchard Park.

== History ==
Orchard Park was founded by Quaker settlers in 1803. The village, formerly called "Potters Corners", was incorporated in 1921. The name change to "Orchard Park" was suggested by a local schoolteacher. Several years later, the town also changed its name from "East Hamburg" to "Orchard Park", after the village.

Orchard Park was a stop on the Underground Railroad, as fugitive slaves stopped over at Quaker-run homes on their way north to Black Rock in Buffalo from Collins.

== Geography ==
Orchard Park is located at 42°45′43″N 78°44′29″W (42.762159, -78.741405).

According to the United States Census Bureau, the village has a total area of 1.4 square miles (3.6 km^{2}), of which 1.3 square miles (3.4 km^{2}) is land and 0.04 square miles (0.10 km^{2}) (2.88%) is water.

Green Lake is a small artificial lake within the village.

U.S. Route 20A (Quaker Street) passes through the village, intersecting with New York State Route 240/New York State Route 277. At this intersection the street name of Route 277 changes from Orchard Park Road (which leads toward the city) to N/S Buffalo Street (which leads into the village). This causes people in the village to refer to Route 277 as Buffalo Street and people that aren't from the village to call it Orchard Park Road. This intersection is known locally as the "Four Corners" and is the center of the village.

== Demographics ==
Historical population
| Census | Pop. | Note | %± |
|---|---|---|---|
| 1930 | 1,144 | | — |
| 1940 | 1,304 | | 14.0% |
| 1950 | 2,054 | | 57.5% |
| 1960 | 3,278 | | 59.6% |
| 1970 | 3,732 | | 13.8% |
| 1980 | 3,671 | | −1.6% |
| 1990 | 3,280 | | −10.7% |
| 2000 | 3,294 | | 0.4% |
| 2010 | 3,246 | | −1.5% |
| 2020 | 3,108 | | −4.3% |
U.S. Decennial Census

As of the census of 2000, there were 3,294 people, 1,418 households, and 925 families residing in the village. The population density was 2,450.4 inhabitants per square mile (946.1/km^{2}). There were 1,459 housing units at an average density of 1,085.4 per square mile (419.1/km^{2}). The racial makeup of the village was 97.63% White, 0.46% Black or African American, 0.21% Native American, 0.97% Asian, 0.15% from other races, and 0.58% from two or more races. Hispanic or Latino of any race were 0.88% of the population.

There were 1,418 households, out of which 28.1% had children under the age of 18 living with them, 54.4% were married couples living together, 9.2% had a female householder with no husband present, and 34.7% were non-families. 31.0% of all households were made up of individuals, and 13.6% had someone living alone who was 65 years of age or older. The average household size was 2.32 and the average family size was 2.93.

In the village, the population was spread out, with 23.5% under the age of 18, 5.1% from 18 to 24, 26.1% from 25 to 44, 25.7% from 45 to 64, and 19.6% who were 65 years of age or older. The median age was 42 years. For every 100 females, there were 91.7 males. For every 100 females age 18 and over, there were 84.7 males.

The median income for a household in the village was $51,520, and the median income for a family was $70,483. Males had a median income of $46,810 versus $30,679 for females. The per capita income for the village was $29,754. About 2.1% of families and 4.3% of the population were below the poverty line, including 7.6% of those under age 18 and 1.5% of those age 65 or over.

== Landmarks ==
- The Quaker Meeting House is located in the Village of Orchard Park. It was built by Quakers in 1820 and is the oldest house of worship in Erie County and is the home of the county's oldest congregation. The cemetery surrounding it is maintained by the East Hamburg Friends Cemetery Association and contains the graves of many of Orchard Park's first settlers.
- The Orchard Park station is a historic railway station built by the Buffalo, Rochester and Pittsburgh Railway company in 1911. It is located at 2 Highland Avenue and is owned and maintained by the Western New York Railway Historical Society, Inc.
- Located at 4287 South Buffalo Street is the former residence of Dr. Willard B. Jolls who practiced medicine there from 1902 to 1963. The house was built in 1869 by merchant Ambrose Johnson. It is owned by the Town of Orchard Park and is the location of Orchard Park Historical Society Museum.

== Government ==
As of April 2015, the mayor of the village of Orchard Park is Jo Ann Litwin Clinton. The village presently holds a single government function: the Department of Public Works, which maintains the streets, sidewalks, domestic water system and sewer system. This is much reduced from the village's original organization, under which it managed the Orchard Park Police department and the fire department, and operated a sewage treatment plant on Duerr Road and a water treatment reservoir and treatment plant in West Falls. As the influence of the Town of Orchard Park increased, the municipal functions moved to the town. In the 1980s the sewer treatment functions were turned over to Erie County, and the plant closed. In the early 1990s the water treatment plant and reservoir were abandoned, with water supply being managed by the Erie County Water Authority. The main reason for this change were Clean Water Act requirements which the old "Water Plant" could not maintain having been constructed during the Great Depression in the 1930s.

The village DPW continues to maintain the road, water lines, sewer lines and sidewalks year-round with a seven- to eight-man crew. This is reduced from the days when the DPW crew grew in the summer to eleven to twelve men and crews would completely engineer and rebuild entire village streets.

=== Presidents and Mayors ===
==== Presidents ====
- 1921-1923 Thomas Morgan
- 1923-1925 Ralph Thom
- 1925-1927 Howard Langworthy

==== Mayors ====
- 1927-1929 Harold Brookins
- 1929-1933 Carlton Hambleton
- 1933-1935 Leon Lancaster
- 1935-1937 Louis Long
- 1937-1943 Herbert Anthony
- 1943-1947 Edward Long
- 1947-1953 Loren Roth
- 1953-1966 George Wakeman
- 1966-1973 B. Roy Ertell
- 1973-1977 Fred Bristol
- 1977-1981 Scott McFarland
- 1981-1989 George Knaisch
- 1989-2005 Patricia Dickman
- 2005-2014 John Wilson
- 2015-2015 David Rood
- 2015–Present Jo Ann Ltiwin Clinton
