= U.S. Route 20A (New York) =

Alternate highway route in New York State

U.S. Route 20A
- US 20A highlighted in red

Route information
- Auxiliary route of US 20
- Maintained by NYSDOT
- Length: 83.59 mi (134.53 km)
- Existed: c. 1939–present

Major junctions
- West end: US 20 in Hamburg
- US 219 in Orchard Park; NY 400 in East Aurora; NY 19 in Warsaw; I-390 near Geneseo
- East end: US 20 / NY 5 / NY 64 in East Bloomfield

Location
- Country: United States
- State: New York
- Counties: Erie, Wyoming, Livingston, Ontario

Highway system
- United States Numbered Highway System; List; Special; Divided; New York Highways; Interstate; US; State; Reference; Parkways
← US 20	→ NY 20B

U.S. Route 20A (US 20A) is an east–west alternate route of US 20 that extends for 83.59 miles (134.53 km) across the western portion of New York in the United States. It leaves US 20 in Hamburg, a suburb of Buffalo, and rejoins it in East Bloomfield about five miles (8.0 km) west of Canandaigua, the county seat of Ontario County. The western terminus is situated just northeast of the intersection of US 20 and US 62 and west of Highmark Stadium. At its east end, US 20A also meets New York State Route 5 (NY 5) and NY 64. Most of the route is known as Big Tree Road; outside Highmark Stadium, the highway is known as the Timothy J. Russert Highway in memory of Buffalo native Tim Russert.

While the main line of US 20 takes a direct path between Hamburg, Buffalo, and East Bloomfield via Avon, US 20A veers to the south to serve several villages and hamlets, including the villages of Geneseo and Warsaw. The town of Attica, famous for the Attica Prison riot of 1971, lies between US 20 and US 20A. As the route heads east, US 20A connects to several north–south freeways, such as NY 400 outside of East Aurora and Interstate 390 (I-390) between Geneseo and Lakeville. Outside of the communities that dot the highway, US 20A is a two-lane, rural highway.

The highway carried several designations prior to becoming US 20A c. 1939. In the mid-1920s, the section of modern US 20A from East Aurora to Lakeville was part of New York State Route 35 (NY 35). US 20 was first signed in New York in 1927, occupying the piece of NY 35 between East Aurora and Geneseo and all of what is now US 20A west of East Aurora upon assignment. It was altered to also use the Geneseo–Lakeville section of former NY 35 in the early 1930s. At the time, the section of current US 20A between US 20 and Bristol was designated as NY 254. US 20 was realigned onto its current alignment between Hamburg and Avon c. 1938, and US 20A was assigned to US 20's former routing west of Lakeville and all of NY 254 by the following year.

== Route description ==
=== Buffalo area ===
US 20A separates from US 20 just northeast of an intersection locally known as "Seven Corners" in the town of Hamburg. The route heads east through the Buffalo suburbs on Big Tree Road, entering the town of Orchard Park and passing south of the southern campus of SUNY Erie. At Abbott Road, US 20A becomes the "Timothy J. Russert Highway", named for Buffalo native Tim Russert. The route continues on, passing south of Highmark Stadium before changing back to Big Tree Road at California Road. Not far to the east, US 20A meets US 219 (Southern Expressway) at an interchange. Past US 219, the route enters the village of Orchard Park, becoming Quaker Street and intersecting the concurrent routes of NY 240 and NY 277 in the center of the community.

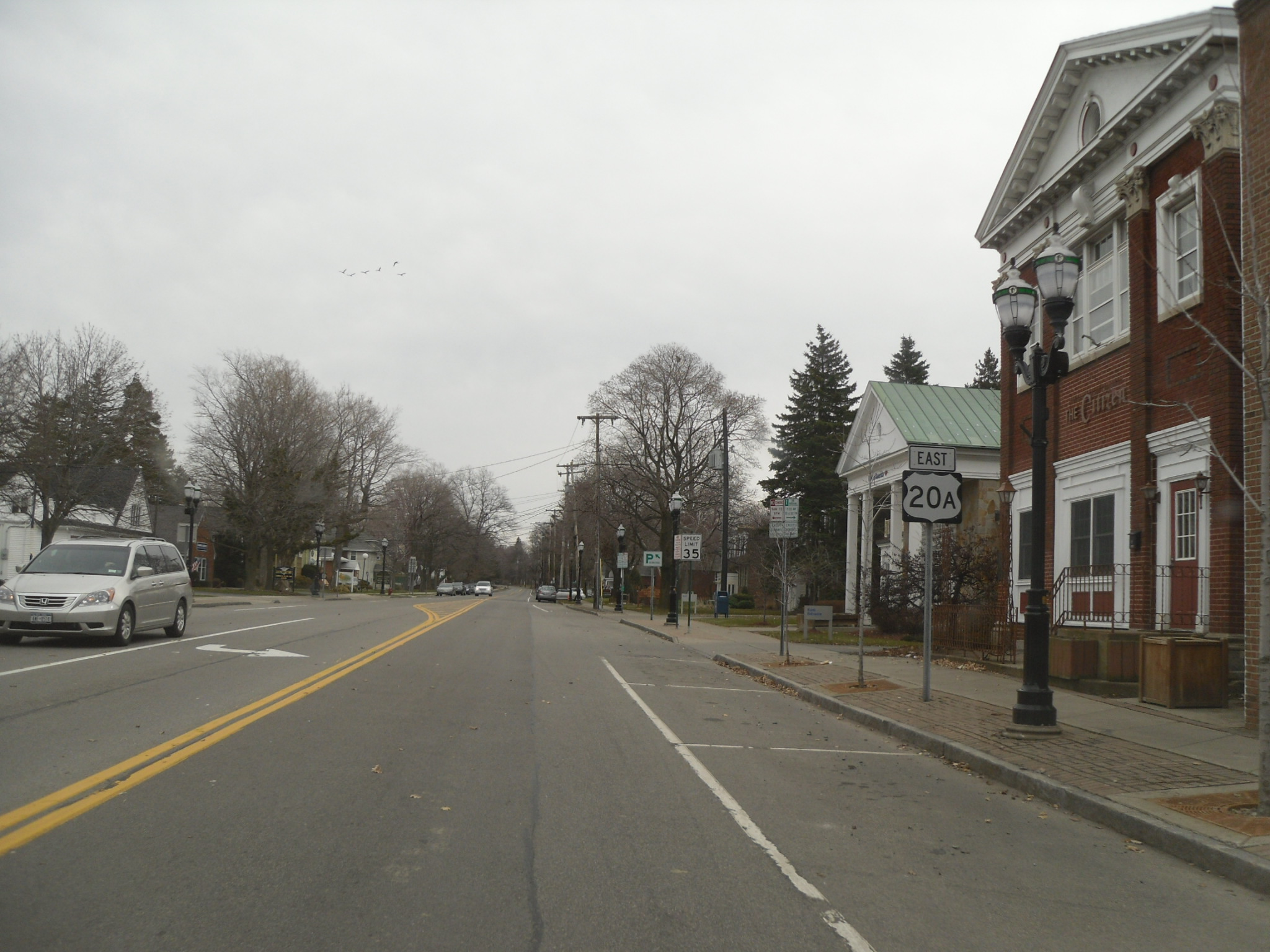
Eastbound on US 20A in the village of Orchard Park

Outside of the village, US 20A becomes Quaker Road, passing through slightly less developed areas as it progresses eastward. Midway between Orchard Park village and East Aurora, US 20A intersects the southern terminus of NY 187 (Transit Road) at the Orchard Park–Aurora town line. Transit Road, however, continues south for one mile (1.6 km) as County Route 553 (CR 553). Farther east, US 20A runs south of Cazenovia Creek for two miles (3.2 km) across open terrain prior to crossing the creek and entering the densely populated village of East Aurora.

The route enters East Aurora on Hamburg Street, running parallel to a branch of Cazenovia Creek for a half-mile (0.80 km) to Buffalo Street. Here, US 20A meets the overlapping routes of NY 16 and NY 78 at a traffic circle in the village's primary business district. The three routes come together, becoming Main Street and passing by the Fillmore House as it proceeds through the center of the village. At Olean Street, one mile (1.6 km) east of the circle in East Aurora's central business district, NY 16 turns right, continuing south toward Pennsylvania. US 20A and NY 78 remain concurrent as they exit the village and meet NY 400 (Aurora Expressway) on the eastern edge.

=== East Aurora to Warsaw ===
East of NY 400, US 20A and NY 78 become Big Tree Road once more as the highway leaves the Buffalo suburbs and passes through the rural eastern portion of Erie County. Near the Wales hamlet of Wales Center, NY 78 departs US 20A on Strykersville Road, ending the four-mile (6.4 km) overlap. In Wales Center itself, US 20A intersects Four Rod Road, once designated as NY 358 and now part of CR 356. Past the hamlet, US 20A deviates from its linear east–west alignment, swerving to the south on a newer routing of Big Tree Road before reuniting with its original routing one mile (1.6 km) to the east. Two miles (3.2 km) ahead, US 20A exits Erie County and enters the equally rural Wyoming County town of Sheldon.

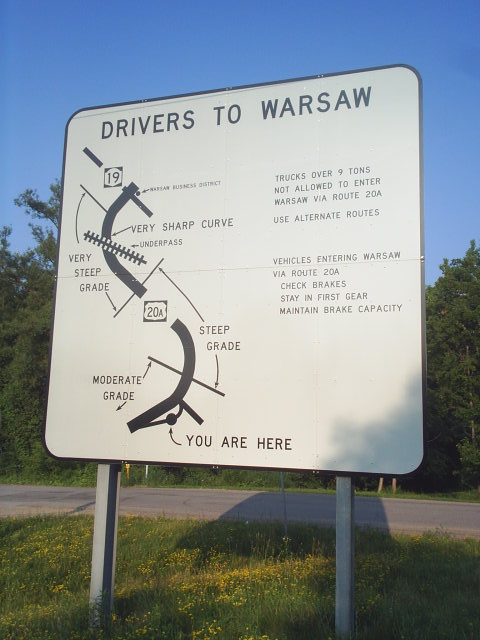
Sign on US 20A warning motorists of steep grades and sharp turns near Warsaw

In Sheldon, US 20A intersects NY 77 near Sheldon Center and NY 98 in Varysburg, forming a concurrency with the latter into the adjacent town of Orangeville. Upon crossing the town line, the two routes split, with NY 98 proceeding southwest to Java. US 20A continues southeast from NY 98 on a linear alignment, intersecting the southern terminus of NY 238 at Halls Corner, a small hamlet located near the Orangeville–Warsaw town line. Shortly after passing NY 238, US 20A makes a turn to the east as it enters Warsaw. Roughly 1.5 miles (2.4 km) from the town line, US 20A descends into the Oatka Valley, a large ravine containing Oatka Creek and the entirety of the Warsaw. Now named Buffalo Street, US 20A heads east–west across the village, intersecting NY 19, one of two state routes to directly connect Lake Ontario with the Pennsylvania state line, at the center of Warsaw.

Past the NY 19 junction, US 20A continues east along Buffalo Street to the eastern edge of the village and the valley, where the route turns a full 90 degrees to the north to climb the side of the Oatka Valley. The route ascends approximately 300 feet (91 m), passing under the Rochester and Southern Railroad (RSR)—which runs along the foot of the gorge—before exiting the valley and returning to an east–west alignment as it heads toward Perry and points east. All oversize trucks are prohibited from using the section of US 20A between NY 19 and Minor Road at the top of the valley due to the steep grade of the hill and the sharp curve at the bottom.

=== Warsaw to Geneseo ===
Outside of the Oatka Valley, US 20A heads east through the remainder of the town of Warsaw prior to entering the town of Perry. The route serves Perry–Warsaw Airport on its way to Perry Center, a small hamlet situated directly north of the village of Perry, where US 20A intersects NY 246. The portion of US 20A in Perry is otherwise uneventful, and the route quietly passes into the Livingston County town of Leicester 2.5 miles (4.0 km) later. After another one mile (1.6 km) of rural surroundings, US 20A meets NY 39 at a junction approximately 1.5 miles (2.4 km) southwest of the village of Leicester. The two routes converge, following Leicester Road northeast to the village, where the highway's name shifts to Main Street upon entering the village limits.

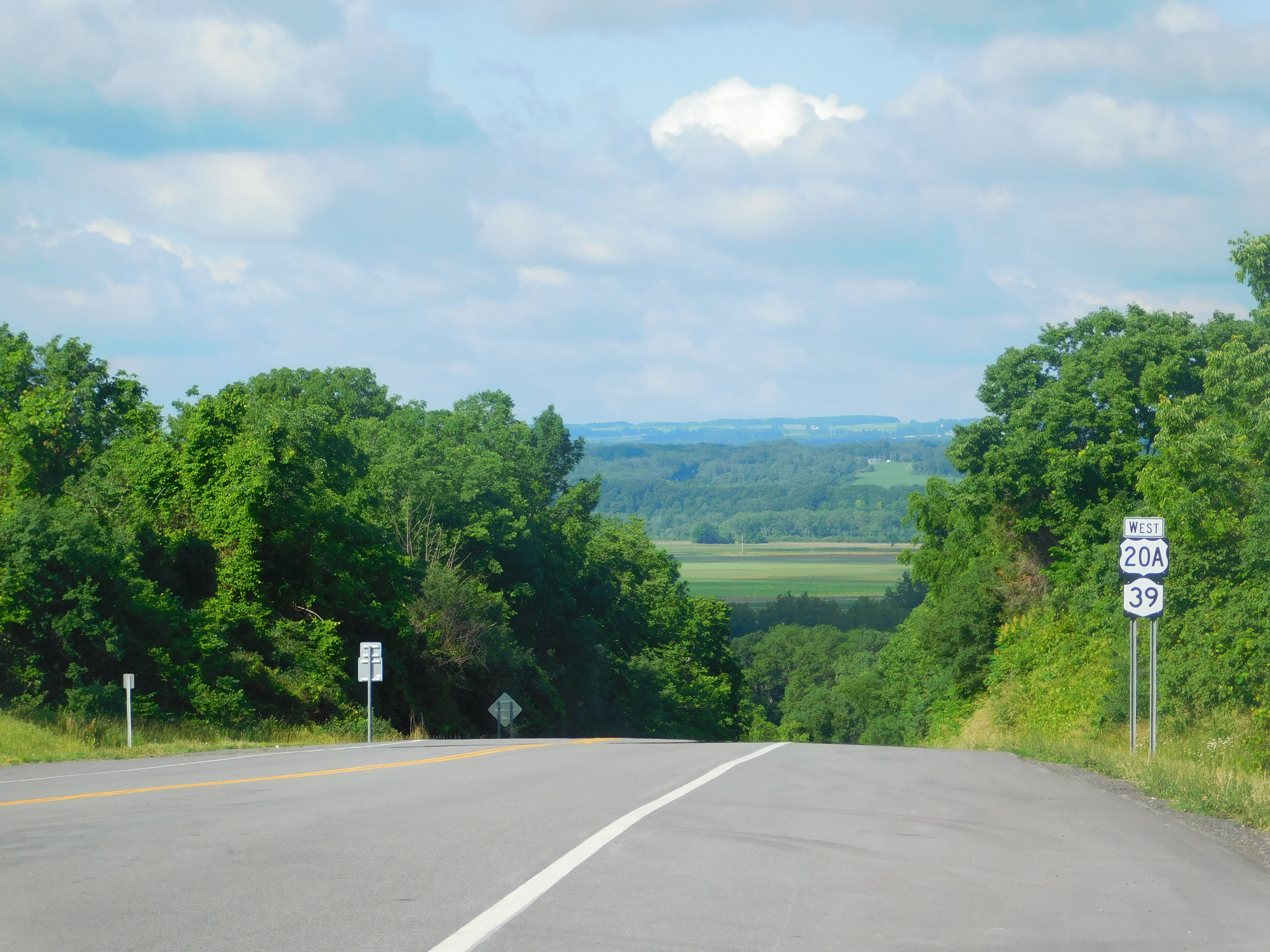
US 20A and NY 39 in the town of Geneseo

East of a grade crossing with the Genesee and Wyoming Railroad subdivision of the RSR, US 20A and NY 39 connect to NY 36 at York Road. NY 36 briefly overlaps with US 20A and NY 39 for one block before heading to the south via Mount Morris Road at the village center. US 20A and NY 39 continue on, leaving Leicester on as Cuylerville Road, named for the community located directly northeast of Leicester. The routes pass in and out of Cuylerville and head eastward into a wide valley, crossing Beards Creek and the Genesee River. At the eastern bank of the latter, the highway crosses into the town of Geneseo.

On the other side of the Genesee River, US 20A and NY 39 rise in elevation once more as they head to the northeast, climbing the eastern edge of the gully to meet NY 63 at the valley's eastern edge. After a brief concurrency with US 20A and NY 39, NY 63 splits off to the west, running alongside the western edge of the nearby State University of New York at Geneseo campus. In contrast, US 20A and NY 39 form a portion of the eastern edge of the campus between NY 63 and Mary Jemison Drive in the village of Geneseo. At the latter intersection, US 20A and NY 39 turn east onto South Street. After just one block, the US 20A/NY 39 overlap comes to an end as NY 39 follows Main Street north out of Geneseo toward Avon.

US 20A continues east through Geneseo before taking on a more northeasterly alignment outside of the village. At this point, the highway becomes Lakeville Road for the Conesus Lake community to the northeast. The route proceeds across open terrain to the western outskirts of Lakeville, where US 20A connects to I-390 at exit 8. Past the expressway, US 20A continues on a northeast alignment—albeit more eastern than northern—as it intersects NY 256 and enters both the town of Livonia and the hamlet of Lakeville.

=== Finger Lakes ===
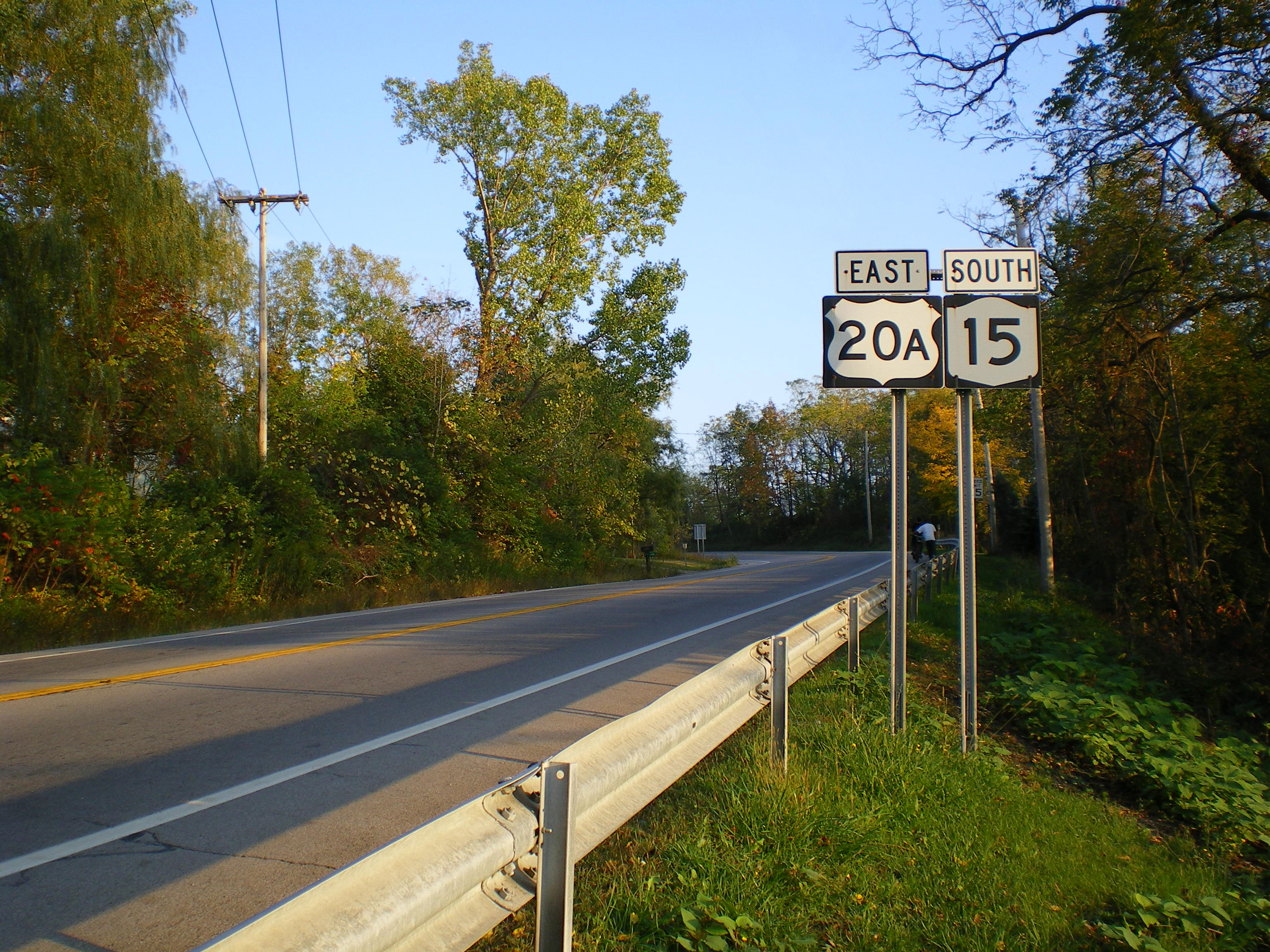
US 20A east and NY 15 south in Lakeville

As Big Tree Road once more, US 20A acts as the major east–west thoroughfare for Lakeville, connecting the hamlet to I-390 in the west to the village of Livonia to the east. In the center of Lakeville, US 20A intersects the north–south NY 15. The two routes converge on Big Tree Road, following the roadway around the northern tip of Conesus Lake and southeastward through the rural landscape between Lakeville and Livonia. In Livonia, Big Tree Road continues to the southeast as Big Tree Street; however, US 20A and NY 15 leave Big Tree Road to follow Main Street instead. NY 15 remains on US 20A for one more block to the center of Livonia, at which point it continues southward on Commercial Street toward Conesus while US 20A heads east on Main Street and out of the village as Richmond Mills Road.

For the next 2.5 miles (4.0 km), US 20A loosely parallels Big Tree Road, located about one mile (1.6 km) to the south. At a rural junction known as Bosley Corner, US 20A merges with the north–south NY 15A and follows NY 15A south toward the hamlet of Hemlock. While concurrent with NY 15A, US 20A crosses Big Tree Road at the midpoint of the concurrency. The two routes proceed through Hemlock before splitting south of the community. Here, US 20A breaks from NY 15A and continues east on Honeoye Road into the Ontario County town of Richmond.

About 2.5 miles (4.0 km) into the sparsely developed town, US 20A reconnects to Big Tree Road at Curtis Corner. The route, however, becomes Main Street for the hamlet of Honeoye a short distance to the east. US 20A runs east–west through the small yet highly developed community, crossing Honeoye Creek and passing north of Honeoye Lake. It leaves the hamlet soon after, turning to the northeast and traversing a series of small hills as it passes into the town of Bristol as Honeoye Road once again. Roughly four miles (6.4 km) from the town line, US 20A intersects NY 64 in the Bristol Valley. US 20A turns north onto NY 64, following the state route out of the valley and into the town of East Bloomfield, where US 20A ends four miles (6.4 km) later at an intersection with US 20 and NY 5. The section of US 20A that overlaps NY 64 was signed north–south, matching NY 64's direction, however, the US 20A north–south tabs were replaced by east–west tabs between 2010 and 2012, but still the north–south tabs are now for NY 64 shields only. NY 64 continues west from the junction on US 20 and NY 5.

== History ==
=== Origins and designation ===
In 1908, the New York State Legislature established a statewide legislative route system that initially consisted of 37 unsigned routes. The portion of what is now US 20A between Four Rod Road in Wales and NY 98 in Sheldon was included in Route 19, a highway that extended from Buffalo to Batavia. Two smaller segments of modern US 20A—the sections concurrent to NY 16 in East Aurora and NY 64 in Ontario County—became part of Route 17 and Route 14, respectively. When the first set of posted routes in New York were assigned in 1924, the entirety of legislative Route 17 was designated as part of NY 16 while the portion of modern US 20A between Lakeville and Livonia became part of NY 4. By 1926, the section of what is now US 20A between NY 16 in East Aurora and NY 4 in Lakeville was designated as part of NY 35, which initially continued northwest to Buffalo by way of an overlap with NY 16 and followed NY 4 north from Lakeville to NY 5 in East Avon.

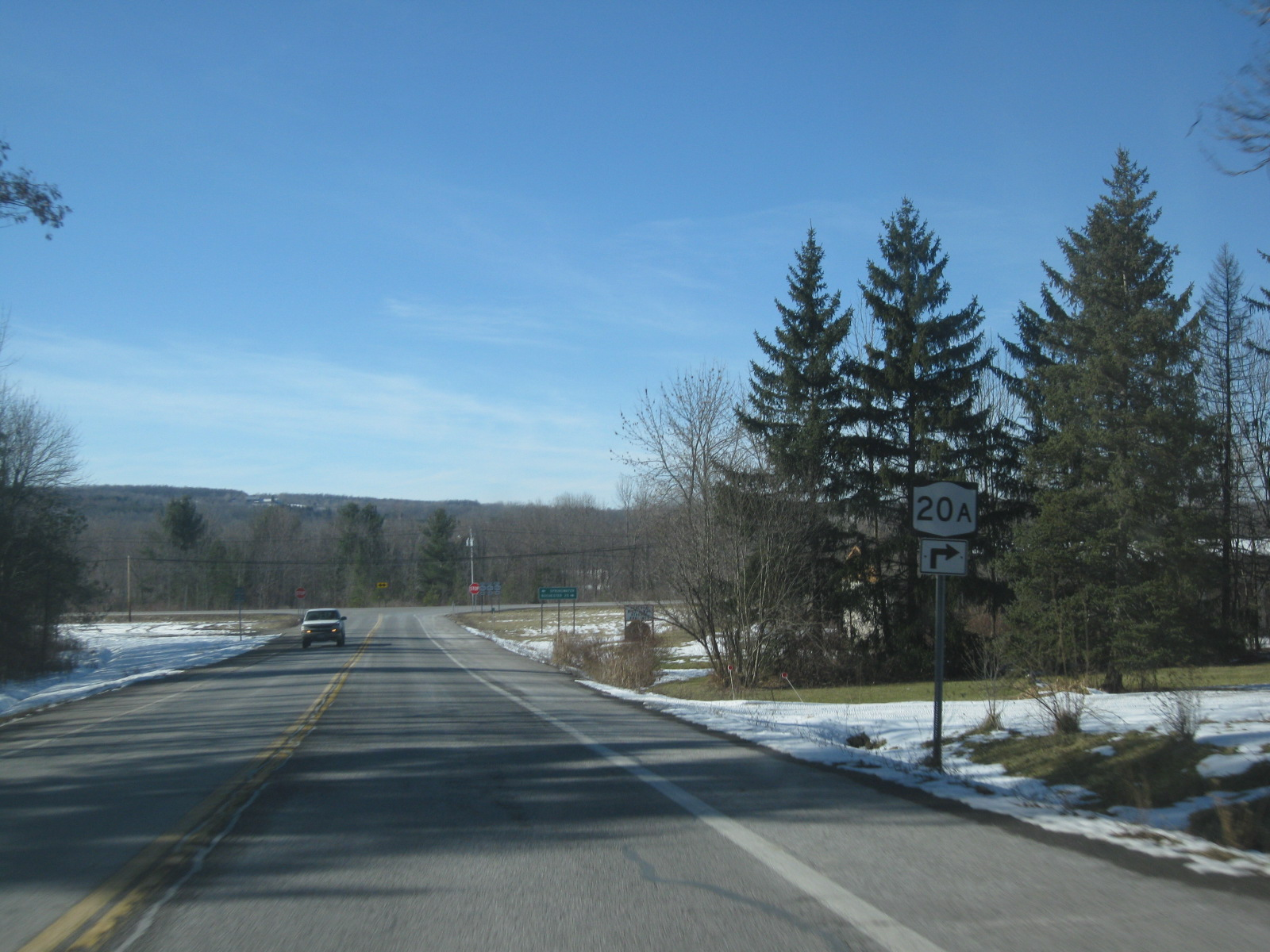
Approaching NY 15A on US 20A westbound near Hemlock. Note the errant NY 20A shield.

NY 35 was largely replaced by US 20 when U.S. Highways were first signed in New York in 1927. At the time, US 20 entered the Buffalo area on modern NY 5 and followed Big Tree Road and current US 20A east to East Aurora, where it overlapped NY 16 to reach the former routing of NY 35. From there, it continued east over former NY 35 to Geneseo before proceeding to Avon on modern NY 39. Meanwhile, NY 4 was renumbered to NY 2 to eliminate numerical duplication with the new US 4 in the Capital District. The portion of former NY 35 between Geneseo and Lakeville went unnumbered until the 1930 state highway renumbering when it became the westernmost portion of NY 254, an east–west highway that initially extended eastward along modern US 20A and CR 32 to a junction with NY 21 west of Canandaigua. NY 254 was truncated westward to NY 64 in Bristol by the following year.

US 20 was realigned between Geneseo and East Avon c. 1931 to follow NY 254 east to Lakeville, where it turned north to follow NY 2 to East Avon. NY 254 was truncated to the east end of its former overlap with NY 2 in Livonia as a result while US 20's former routing between Geneseo and Avon became NY 20D. US 20 was altered again c. 1938 to follow its modern alignment between Hamburg and East Avon. Its former routing between Hamburg and Geneseo became part of the new NY 20A, which also continued north to Avon over NY 20D. The remainder of US 20's old routing between Geneseo and Lakeville became part of a reextended NY 254. US 20A was established by the following year, replacing NY 20A west of Geneseo and NY 254 from Geneseo to Bristol. The new highway also followed NY 64 northward to East Bloomfield in order to rejoin US 20 in the hamlet of South Bloomfield. NY 254 was reassigned to the Geneseo–Avon portion of NY 20A; however, it was supplanted by an extended NY 39 c. 1940.

=== Other developments ===
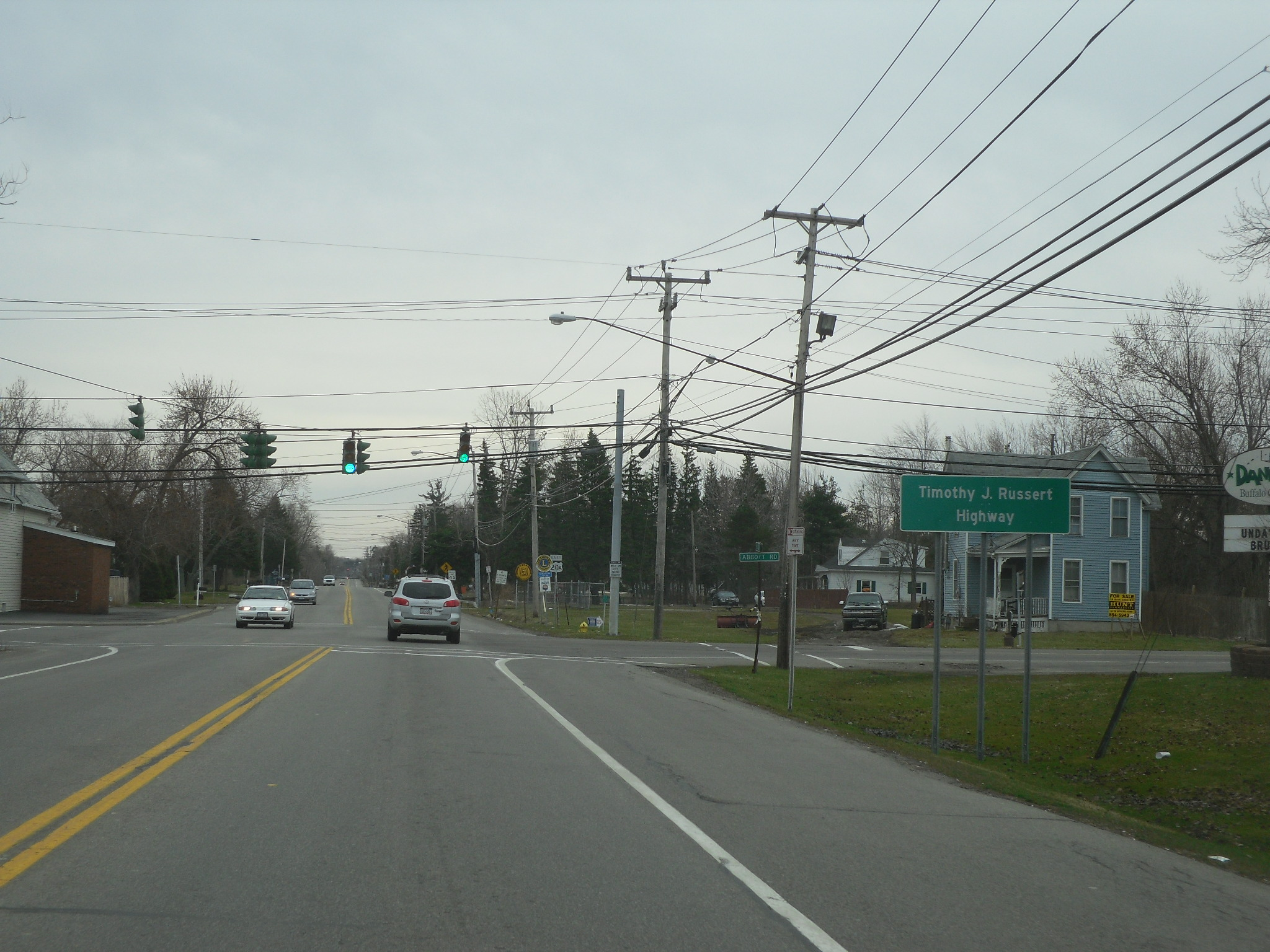
Timothy J. Russert Highway sign at US 20A and Abbott Road

On the morning of March 12, 1994, a large section of the roof in the southern end of the Retsof Salt Mine collapsed. The collapsed portion of the mine was located near the hamlet of Cuylerville, located on US 20A just south of the mine. One day before the collapse, warning signs were erected at the bridge carrying US 20A over nearby Beards Creek due to the presence of bumps in the pavement along the bridge approaches. Over the next few weeks, two large sinkholes opened on the surface above the mine, one of them located just south of the US 20A bridge over Beards Creek. This sinkhole led to the collapse of a small area of US 20A east of the creek and the closure and, ultimately, collapse of the bridge over the creek. As a result, a detour was installed between Leicester and Geneseo. No construction was done on the area for a number of years while a court battle was fought over whether Retsof should reimburse the New York State Department of Transportation to fix the road. The road and new bridge were fixed and reopened in the late 1990s.

On June 18, 2008, a bill seeking to rename the part of US 20A from Abbott Road to California Road as the "Timothy J. Russert Highway" was introduced in the U.S. Senate. The bill, sponsored by Senators Chuck Schumer and Hillary Clinton along with Representative Brian Higgins, was passed by both the House and the Senate and was signed into law by President George W. Bush on July 23, 2008. The designation is in memory of Buffalo native Tim Russert, the long-time host of NBC's Meet the Press who died on June 13, 2008.

== Major intersections ==
County	Location	mi	km	Destinations	Notes
Erie	Town of Hamburg	0.00	0.00	US 20	Western terminus
Erie	Town of Orchard Park	2.40	3.86	US 219 – Springville, Buffalo	
Erie	Village of Orchard Park	3.53	5.68	NY 240 / NY 277	
Erie	Orchard Park–Aurora town line	5.99	9.64	NY 187 north	Southern terminus of NY 187
Erie	East Aurora	9.68	15.58	NY 16 north / NY 78 north	Western terminus of concurrency with NY 16 / NY 78
Erie	East Aurora	10.74	17.28	NY 16 south	Eastern terminus of concurrency with NY 16
Erie	Aurora	11.49	18.49	NY 400 north – Buffalo	No access to NY 400 south; no access from NY 400 north to US 20A
Erie	Wales	13.73	22.10	NY 78 south – Strykersville	Eastern terminus of concurrency with NY 78
Wyoming	Sheldon	22.09	35.55	NY 77 – Bennington Center, Java Center	
Wyoming	Sheldon	26.43	42.53	NY 98 north – Attica	Western terminus of concurrency with NY 98; hamlet of Varysburg
Wyoming	Orangeville	27.04	43.52	NY 98 south – North Java	Eastern terminus of concurrency with NY 98
Wyoming	Orangeville	32.72	52.66	NY 238 north – Attica	Southern terminus of NY 238; hamlet of Halls Corner
Wyoming	Village of Warsaw	35.98	57.90	NY 19	
Wyoming	Town of Perry	42.80	68.88	NY 246 – Pavilion, Perry	
Livingston	Town of Leicester	46.75	75.24	NY 39 west / CR 4 east / CR 62 south – Perry	Western terminus of concurrency with NY 39
Livingston	Village of Leicester	49.04	78.92	NY 36 north – Caledonia	Western terminus of concurrency with NY 36
Livingston	Village of Leicester	49.18	79.15	NY 36 south to I-390 – Mount Morris, Letchworth State Park	Eastern terminus of concurrency with NY 36
Livingston	Town of Geneseo	52.92	85.17	NY 63 south – Mount Morris, Dansville	Southern terminus of concurrency with NY 63
Livingston	Town of Geneseo	53.23	85.67	NY 63 north – Batavia	Northern terminus of concurrency with NY 63; no eastbound access from NY 63 south
Livingston	Village of Geneseo	53.83	86.63	To NY 63 north via Mary Jemison Drive ( NY 942D)	Eastern terminus of unsigned NY 942D; to NY 63 north only signed westbound
Livingston	Village of Geneseo	53.93	86.79	NY 39 east – Avon	Eastern terminus of concurrency with NY 39
Livingston	Town of Geneseo	58.81	94.65	I-390 – Corning, Rochester	Exit 8 on I-390
Livingston	Geneseo–Livonia town line	60.04	96.63	NY 256 (West Lake Road) – Conesus Lake	
Livingston	Town of Livonia	60.57	97.48	NY 15 north	Western terminus of US 20A / NY 15 overlap; hamlet of Lakeville
Livingston	Village of Livonia	62.76	101.00	NY 15 south	Eastern terminus of concurrency with NY 15
Livingston	Town of Livonia	65.76	105.83	NY 15A north / CR 41 east – Lima, Rochester	Northern terminus of concurrency with NY 15A
Livingston	Town of Livonia	67.81	109.13	NY 15A south – Springwater	Southern terminus of concurrency with NY 15A; hamlet of Hemlock
Ontario	Bristol	79.83	128.47	NY 64 south – Naples	Southern terminus of concurrency with NY 64
Ontario	East Bloomfield	83.59	134.53	US 20 / NY 5 / NY 64 north	Eastern terminus; northern terminus of concurrency with NY 64
1.000 mi = 1.609 km; 1.000 km = 0.621 mi: Concurrency terminus
