= New York State Route 75 =

North–south state highway in Erie County, New York

New York State Route 75
- Map of the Buffalo area with NY 75 highlighted in red and NY 950G in blue

Route information
- Maintained by NYSDOT
- Length: 20.85 mi (33.55 km)
- History: Designated NY 18A and NY 62 in 1930; renumbered to NY 75 c. 1932

Major junctions
- South end: NY 39 in Collins Center
- US 62 in Hamburg village I-90 Toll / New York Thruway in Hamburg town
- North end: NY 5 in Hamburg town

Location
- Country: United States
- State: New York
- Counties: Erie

Highway system
- New York Highways; Interstate; US; State; Reference; Parkways
← NY 74	→ NY 76
← NY 18	NY 18A	→ NY 18B

New York State Route 75 (NY 75) is a north–south state highway in Erie County, New York, in the United States. It extends for 20.85 miles (33.55 km) from an intersection with NY 39 in the Collins hamlet of Collins Center to an interchange with NY 5 in the town of Hamburg. The route passes through the village of Hamburg, which serves as the northern terminus of a 2-mile (3.2 km) overlap between U.S. Route 62 (US 62) and NY 75. Past Hamburg, NY 75 connects to the New York State Thruway (Interstate 90 or I-90) northwest of the village before ending a short distance from Lake Erie. The portion of NY 75 south of Hamburg is a two-lane rural highway; in contrast, the section north of the village is four lanes wide and serves commercial and residential areas.

The origins of NY 75 date back to 1930 when New York State Route 62 was assigned to an alignment extending from Great Valley to Buffalo via Hamburg and Athol Springs. NY 62 was renumbered to NY 75 c. 1932 to eliminate numerical duplication with US 62, and the route was truncated to end in Hamburg in the late 1930s after most of it became part of US 219. The section of modern NY 75 south of Hamburg was initially New York State Route 18A, an alternate route of then-NY 18 through Collins and Eden created in 1930. NY 18 was truncated on January 1, 1962, to begin in Niagara County, at which time NY 18A became part of NY 75.

== Route description ==
NY 75 begins at an intersection with NY 39 in Collins Center, a small hamlet in the town of Collins. It initially heads northeastward as the two-lane Sisson Highway, serving a handful of homes on the northern edge of the community prior to entering an open area dominated by farmland. About 0.5 miles (0.8 km) from NY 39, the road curves northward, taking on a due north alignment as it heads across the rolling terrain that comprises most of northern Collins. The highway serves just one community, the hamlet of Whites Corners, on its way into the adjacent town of North Collins. Here, development along NY 75 remains limited at first, consisting of only a handful of isolated farms situated among fields or one of several forested areas. It quickly passes through Marshfield, located just past the town line, on its way toward Langford. A brief stretch of homes begins about 3 miles (5 km) into the town as the route enters Langford, located 5.5 miles (8.9 km) north of Collins Center.

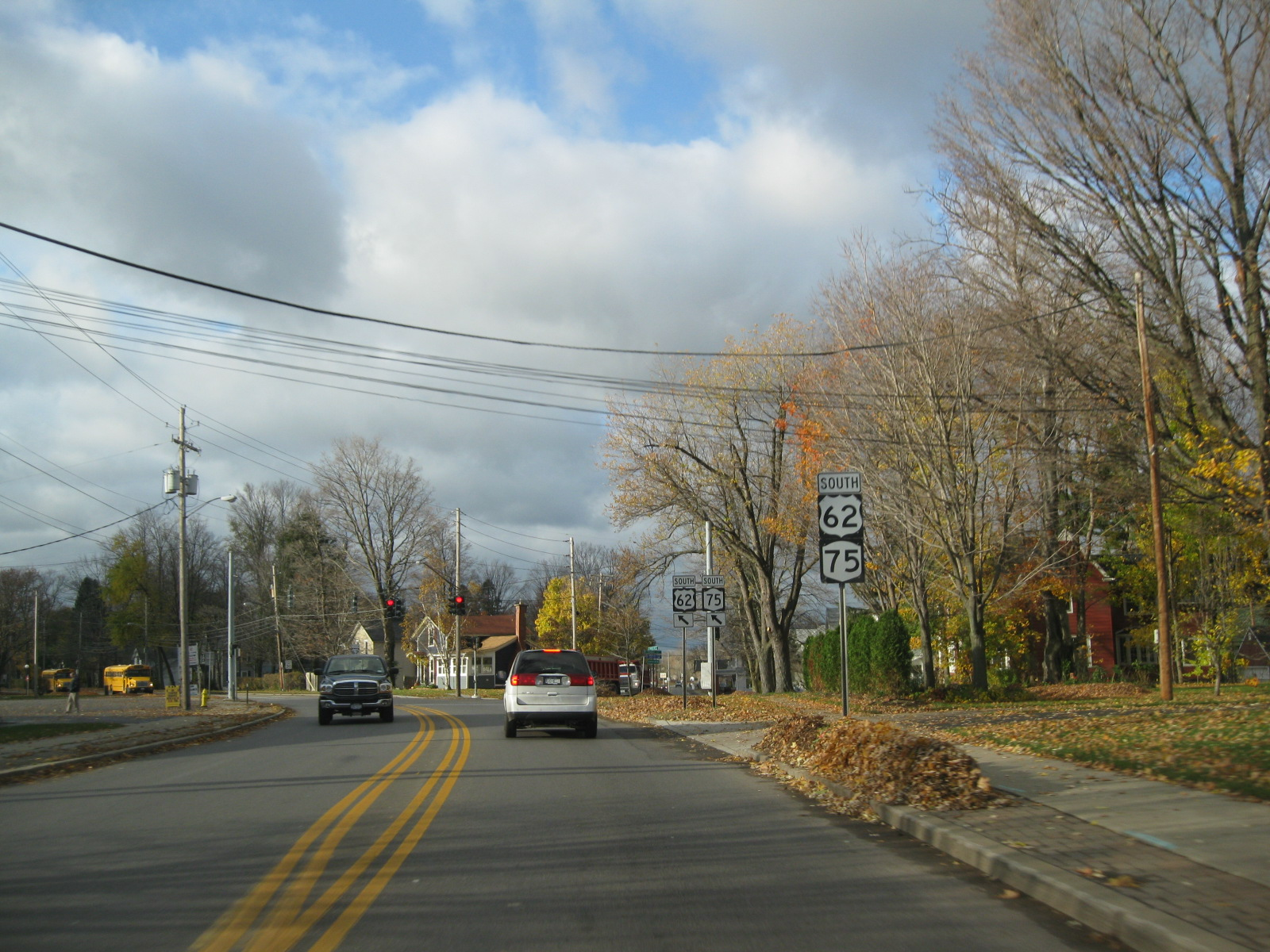
First southbound reassurance markers along the US 62 / NY 75 overlap in Hamburg

In the center of the community, NY 75 intersects Langford Road, designated as NY 249 west of the junction and County Route 39 (CR 39) east of NY 75. Past NY 249, the route exits Langford and heads across another stretch of fields and farms toward the Eden town line. NY 75 breaks from its due north routing just south of it, taking on a more westerly heading to avoid a valley surrounding the south branch of Eighteenmile Creek. It ultimately enters the valley, however, winding its way northward down the depression's southwestern side to reach the creek floor. From here, NY 75 follows the base of the valley to the northwest for 2.5 miles (4.0 km), serving a handful of homes situated along the forested creekside. The route eventually climbs out of the gully and heads due north for a short distance across more fields to a junction with US 62.

At this point, NY 75 turns northeastward, overlapping with US 62 into the nearby town of Hamburg along Gowanda State Road. Development along the highway quickly rises in density from a large farm and a pocket of homes at the start of the concurrency to a series of residential streets across the town line that make up the hamlet of Water Valley. The influx of homes brings US 62 and NY 75 across the main channel of Eighteenmile Creek and into the village of Hamburg, where the highway changes names to Pierce Avenue. The two routes remain concurrent for three blocks to an intersection with Lake Avenue, where Pierce Avenue becomes Main Street. While US 62 continues east into Hamburg's central business district on Main Street, NY 75 follows Lake Street northward along the mostly residential western edge of the village.

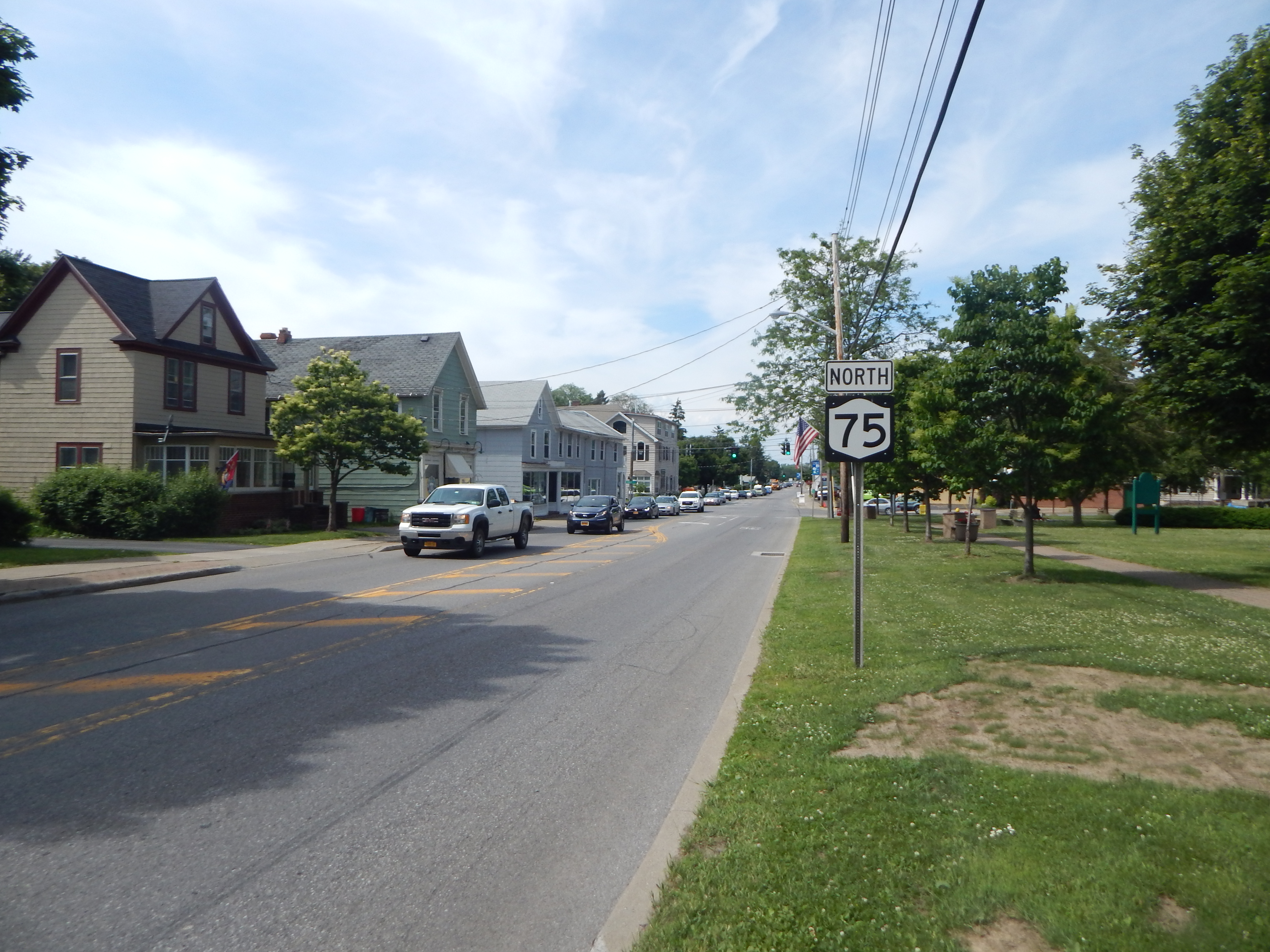
NY 75 northbound in Hamburg after the concurrency with US 62

Outside of the village, NY 75 becomes Camp Road and begins to parallel the Buffalo Southern Railroad, separated from NY 75 by only a row of homes and businesses. While on this stretch, the highway widens from two to four lanes. After 0.5 miles (0.8 km), the route makes a turn to the northwest, passing under the railroad and entering the southeastern portion of a commercial strip that follows NY 75 for 1 mile (1.6 km) to New York State Thruway (I-90) exit 57. It continues past the Thruway for another 0.5 miles (0.8 km) before ceasing at a junction with US 20. Continuing on, the highway remains four lanes wide but serves primarily residential areas located in and around Athol Springs, a hamlet on the shores of Lake Erie.

Just outside Athol Springs, NY 75 passes under two railroad bridges, carrying the Norfolk Southern Railway-owned Lake Erie District line and the CSX Transportation-owned Lake Shore Subdivision line over the highway. On the other side of the overpasses, NY 75 curves northeastward as it becomes Saint Francis Drive, leaving Camp Road to continue northwestward to the lake as a two-lane street. The route continues on, passing south of Saint Francis High School before ending shortly afterward at a partial interchange with NY 5. NY 75 northbound merges directly into NY 5 eastbound, a limited-access highway, while NY 75 southbound begins as an offshoot of NY 5 westbound. The remaining connections are made by way of a loop road leading from Big Tree Road, which NY 5 and NY 75 both intersect just south of the interchange.

== History ==
New York State Route 18A
- Location: Collins Center–Hamburg
- Existed: 1930–January 1, 1962

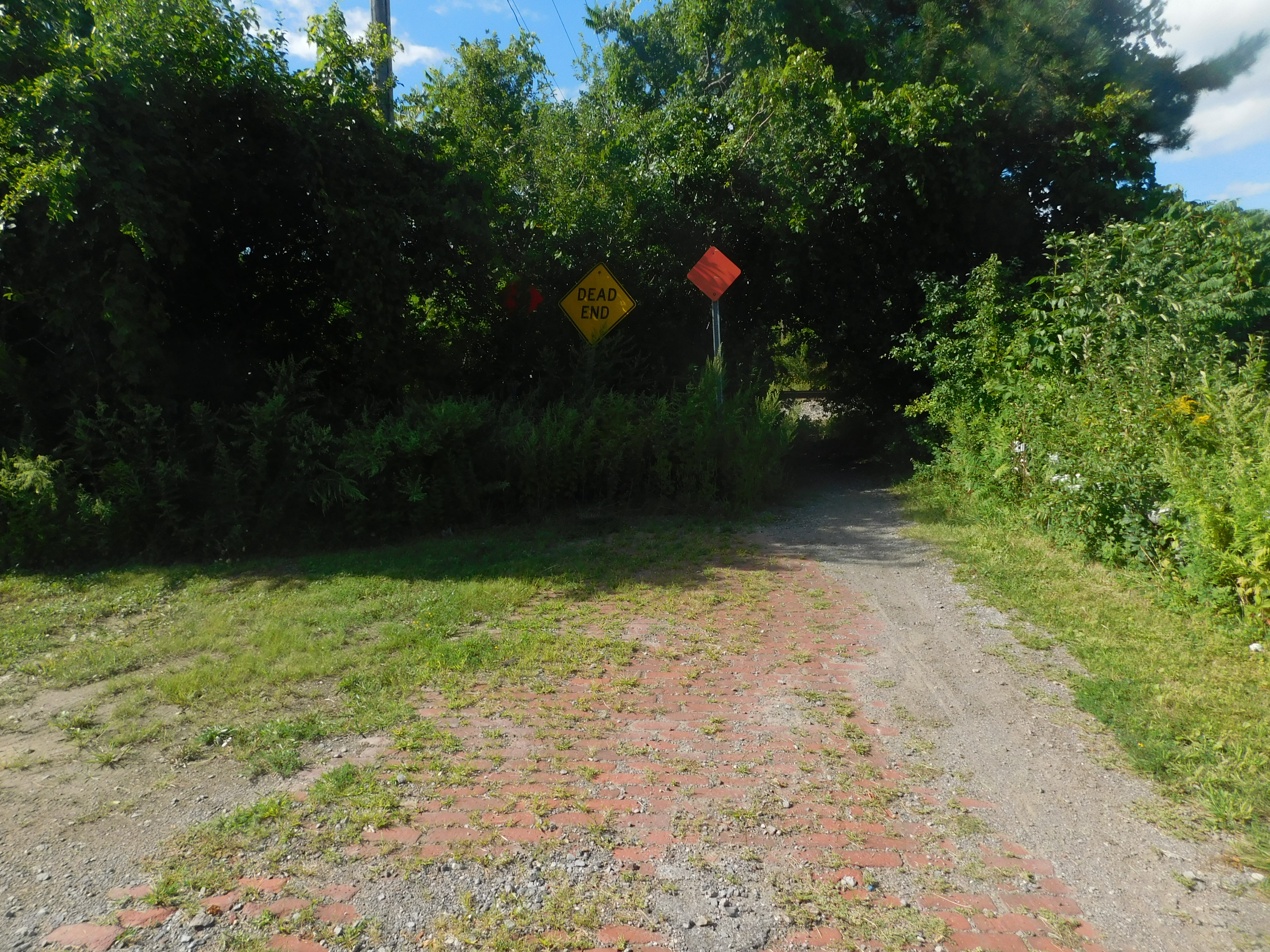
A former alignment of Camp Road (NY 75) in Athol Springs

All of what is now NY 75 was state-maintained by 1926. In the 1930 renumbering of state highways in New York, the portion of modern NY 75 north of the village of Hamburg was designated as part of NY 62, a highway extending from Great Valley north to Buffalo. The section between Collins Center and Eden gained a designation in 1930 when it became part of NY 18A, an alternate route of then-NY 18 between Collins and Eden. NY 18A overlapped with NY 39 between the hamlets of Collins (where NY 18A began at NY 18) and Collins Center, from where the route followed Sisson Highway north to rejoin NY 18 in Eden. US 62 was extended into New York c. 1932. As a result, the portion of NY 62 south of the hamlet of Athol Springs was renumbered to NY 75 to eliminate numerical duplication with the new U.S. Highway. The remainder of old NY 62 became part of an extended NY 5.

When US 219 was extended into New York c. 1935, it was overlaid on the pre-existing NY 75 from Great Valley to Hamburg, creating a lengthy overlap with the route. The overlap was eliminated in the late 1930s when NY 75 was truncated on its southern end to the village of Hamburg. Similarly, NY 18A was truncated to Collins Center on its southern end in the 1950s, eliminating its overlap with NY 39. NY 18 continued to extend south of Niagara County until on January 1, 1962, when it was truncated to begin 35 miles (56 km) north of Hamburg in Lewiston. NY 18A, now separated from its parent route, became an extension of NY 75, which connected to NY 18A's former routing by way of an overlap with US 62 between Hamburg and Eden.

== Major intersections ==
The entire route is in Erie County.

Location	mi	km	Destinations	Notes
Collins	0.00	0.00	NY 39 – Springville, Gowanda	Southern terminus; hamlet of Collins Center
Town of North Collins	6.62	10.65	NY 249 (Langford Road) – North Collins, Farnham	Hamlet of Langford; eastern terminus of NY 249
Town of Eden	14.35	23.09	US 62 south (Gowanda State Road)	Southern terminus of US 62 / NY 75 overlap
Village of Hamburg	16.29	26.22	US 62 north (Main Street) to NY 391	Northern terminus of US 62 / NY 75 overlap
Town of Hamburg	18.22	29.32	I-90 Toll / New York Thruway – Buffalo, Erie	Exit 57 (I-90 / Thruway)
Town of Hamburg	18.97	30.53	US 20 (Southwestern Boulevard) – Depew, Silver Creek	
Town of Hamburg	20.85	33.55	NY 5 / LECT (Lake Shore Road) – Dunkirk, Buffalo Outer Harbor	Northern terminus
1.000 mi = 1.609 km; 1.000 km = 0.621 mi: Concurrency terminus; Electronic toll collection
