= New Oregon, New York =

Hamlet in New York, United States

Coordinates: 42°35′18″N 78°47′30″W

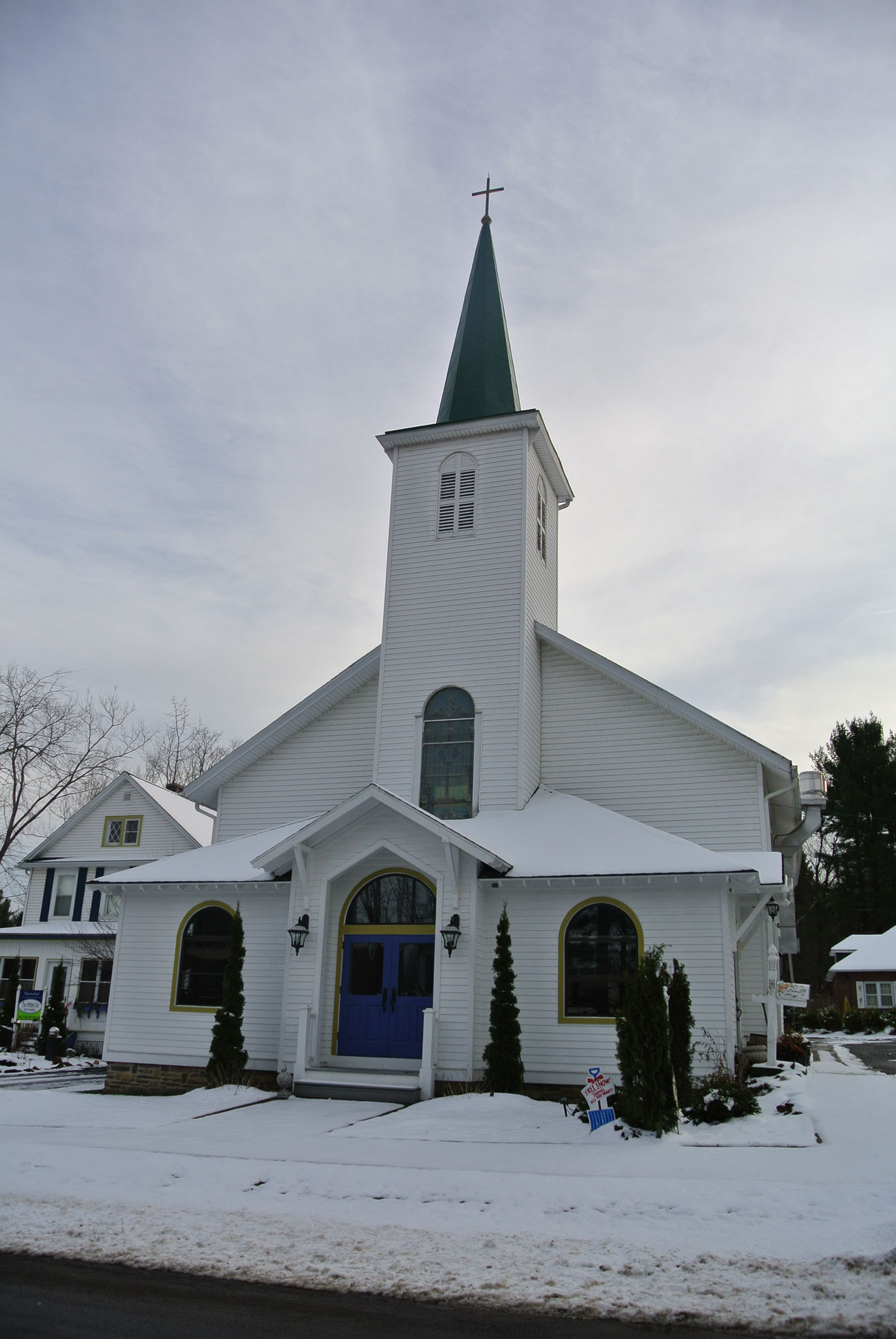
St. Mary of the Immaculate Conception Church, New Oregon, New York

New Oregon is a small hamlet in the town of North Collins in southern Erie County, New York, United States. The hamlet is on the South Branch Eighteen Mile Creek.

== History ==
In 1835 a wave of luxembourgish immigrants settled in New Oregon. In 1860, the value of real estate was $85,650 and of personal property, $26,275. There were 357 residents, mostly farmers. Various trades noted in that year's federal census were the following:

- sawmill sawyer (William Doane)
- schoolmaster (Joseph Rohmer)
- butcher (Charles Thill)
- grocer (John Thiel and Antoine Smith)
- shoemaker (Michael Mayer, Frank Gamel, and Mathias Keuhman)
- blacksmith (Samuel Clark and Valentine Schaus)
- seaman (Uriah Clark)

=== Catholic Church ===
In the 1850s, the nearest Catholic Church was in East Eden, a distance of over seven miles (11 km). New Oregon Catholics wanted a church nearby and adapted a wood frame building with a dirt floor. The priest from East Eden would minister in this church. The first Mass was celebrated on January 1, 1858, with the parish named Saint Mary of the Immaculate Conception.

In 1866, the parish purchased the New Oregon Methodist Church building and made additions. In a 1944 history of the parish, it was noted that "the late Mr. Nicholas Schmitt and many other deceased parishioners, rendered faithful, untiring, noncompensating (sic) assistance in laying the cornerstone and general construction."

In the fall of 2006, the parish merged with Saint Martin and Saint Frances Cabrini to form Epiphany of Our Lord Parish in Langford, and the New Oregon Church was closed. In 2007, the buildings were purchased and now operate as the Marienthal Inn.

=== Post Office ===
New Oregon had its own post office from 1854 to 1903. In 1883, there was a mail route from Collins Center, through Morton's Corners and Woodward's Hollow to New Oregon.
