= U.S. Route 62 in New York =

Segment of American highway

U.S. Route 62
- Map of New York with US 62 highlighted in red and NY 950K in blue

Route information
- Maintained by: NYSDOT; Erie County; the cities of Buffalo and Lackawanna
- Length: 102.77 mi (165.39 km)
- Existed: c. 1932–present

Major junctions
- South end: US 62 at the Pennsylvania state line in Kiantone
- NY 60 in Frewsburg; I-86 / NY 17 in Kennedy; NY 39 in Gowanda; US 20 in Hamburg; I-190 / NY 354 near Buffalo; NY 33 in Buffalo; NY 5 in Amherst; I-290 in Amherst; NY 324 in Tonawanda; I-190 near Niagara Falls
- North end: NY 104 in Niagara Falls

Location
- Country: United States
- State: New York
- Counties: Chautauqua, Cattaraugus, Erie, Niagara

Highway system
- United States Numbered Highway System; List; Special; Divided; New York Highways; Interstate; US; State; Reference; Parkways
← NY 61	→ NY 62A

U.S. Route 62 (US 62) is a part of the U.S. Highway System that travels from the United States–Mexico border at El Paso, Texas, to Niagara Falls, New York. In the U.S. state of New York, US 62 extends 102.77 miles (165.39 km) from the New York–Pennsylvania border south of Jamestown to an intersection with New York State Route 104 (NY 104) in downtown Niagara Falls, bypassing the city of Jamestown and serves the cities of Buffalo and Niagara Falls, along with several villages.

It is the only north–south mainline U.S. highway in Western New York. US 62 was extended into New York c. 1932 and originally was concurrent with the state highways that had previously been designated along its routing—namely NY 18, NY 60, NY 83 and NY 241. These concurrencies were eliminated individually during the 1940s and 1960s. The last of the four concurrencies, with NY 18 from Dayton to Niagara Falls, was removed c. 1962. US 62 has one special route, US 62 Business, located in Niagara Falls. US 62 Business is a former routing of US 62 within the city and was once NY 62A.

== Route description ==
Maintenance of the New York segment of US 62 is handled by several jurisdictions. In Chautauqua, Cattaraugus, and Niagara counties, the route is maintained by the New York State Department of Transportation (NYSDOT). In Erie County, US 62 is locally maintained within the cities of Buffalo and Lackawanna and county-maintained in Amherst between NY 263 (Grover Cleveland Highway) and NY 324 (Sheridan Drive) as County Route 152 (CR 152). The remainder of the highway in the county is state-maintained.

=== Chautauqua and Cattaraugus counties ===
US 62 crosses the New York–Pennsylvania border and enters New York 8 miles (13 km) southeast of the city of Jamestown in Chautauqua County. The route proceeds northward through the town of Kiantone, paralleling the course of Conewango Creek, which lies to the east to the highway. As it approaches the vicinity of the hamlet of Stillwater, US 62 crosses Stillwater Creek and intersects NY 60 at a junction east of the community. While NY 60 heads northwestward to serve Stillwater and the city of Jamestown beyond it, US 62 turns east and enters the town of Carroll upon crossing the Conewango Creek. Just inside the town line, US 62 passes through the large hamlet of Frewsburg.

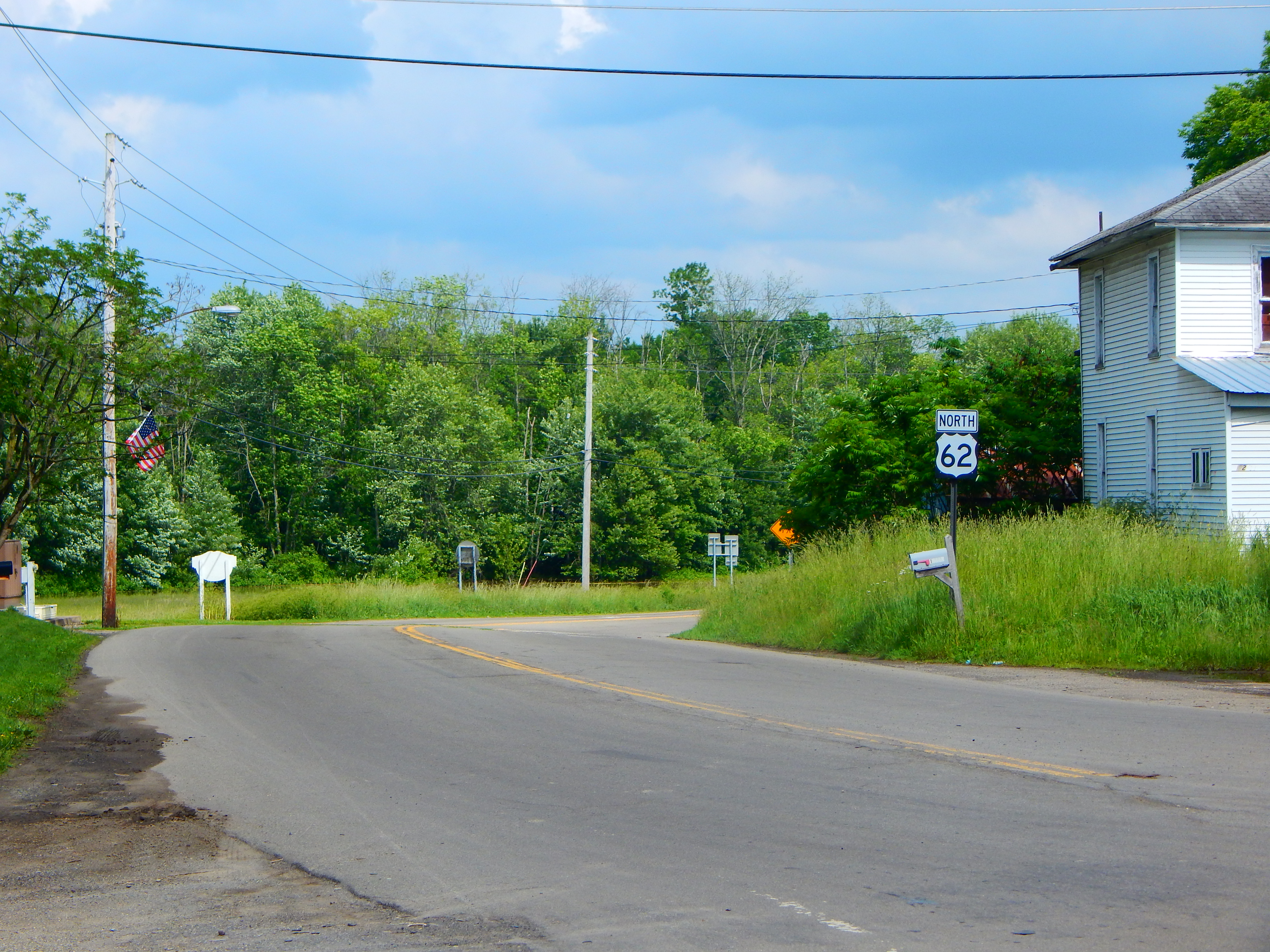
US 62 north through Conewango Valley after NY 83

The route continues on, paralleling Conewango Creek through the towns of Carroll and Poland to an interchange with the Southern Tier Expressway (Interstate 86/NY 17) southeast of the hamlet of Kennedy. US 62 continues on to Kennedy, where it crosses the creek once more and intersects NY 394. US 62 curves eastward, joining NY 394 northeastward out of Kennedy to a junction known as Schermerhorn Corners.

Here, NY 394 continues eastward along the banks of the creek while US 62 heads northward through a small valley surrounding Indian Brook and into the town of Ellington. South of the hamlet of Ellington, the small creek valley gives way to a larger cut of land surrounding Clear Creek. Indian Brook ends near this point; however, US 62 continues northward to serve the community.

In Ellington, US 62 turns eastward for 2.5 miles (4.0 km) before veering back to the north at the Chautauqua–Cattaraugus County line. The route straddles the county line and runs along the base of a larger valley surrounding Conewango Creek to the aptly named community of Conewango Valley, where it intersects NY 83, which heads northwestward into Chautauqua County while US 62 curves eastward to traverse the width of the valley. In the hamlet of Conewango, US 62 meets NY 241 and turns north to follow the eastern edge of the valley through the town of Conewango.

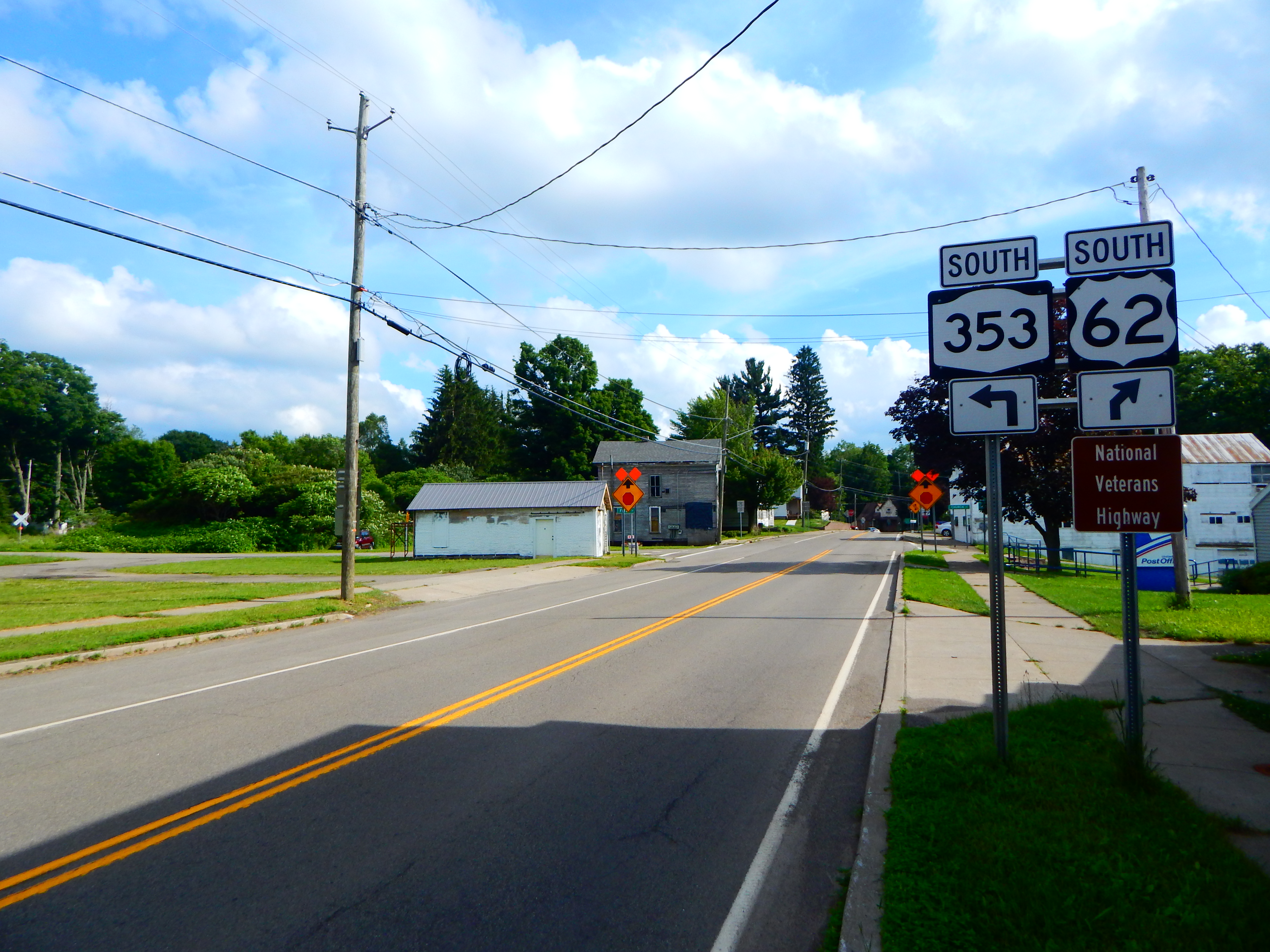
US 62 south at NY 353 in Dayton

Upon entering the town of Leon, US 62 veers slightly northeastward to run along the base of a small valley surrounding Mud Creek. The two entities separate at the hamlet of Leon and US 62 returns northward, descending the eastern side of the Conewango Creek valley and becoming the eastern valley road once again. Just before crossing into the town of Dayton, US 62 leaves the edge of the valley and heads northward through the gully. Here, it crosses over Conewango Creek once more and intersects NY 322.

At the northern extent of the ravine, US 62 turns northeastward toward the community of Dayton, the site of its junction with NY 353. Past Dayton, the valley becomes much less defined as the route follows a small stream through the town of Persia and into the village of Gowanda. US 62 becomes Jamestown Street and serves as the primary north–south street through the community. It intersects NY 39 in the village center, and the two routes embark on an overlap along Main Street. Just past the junction, the two routes cross Cattaraugus Creek and enter Erie County.

=== Erie and Niagara counties ===
==== South of Buffalo ====
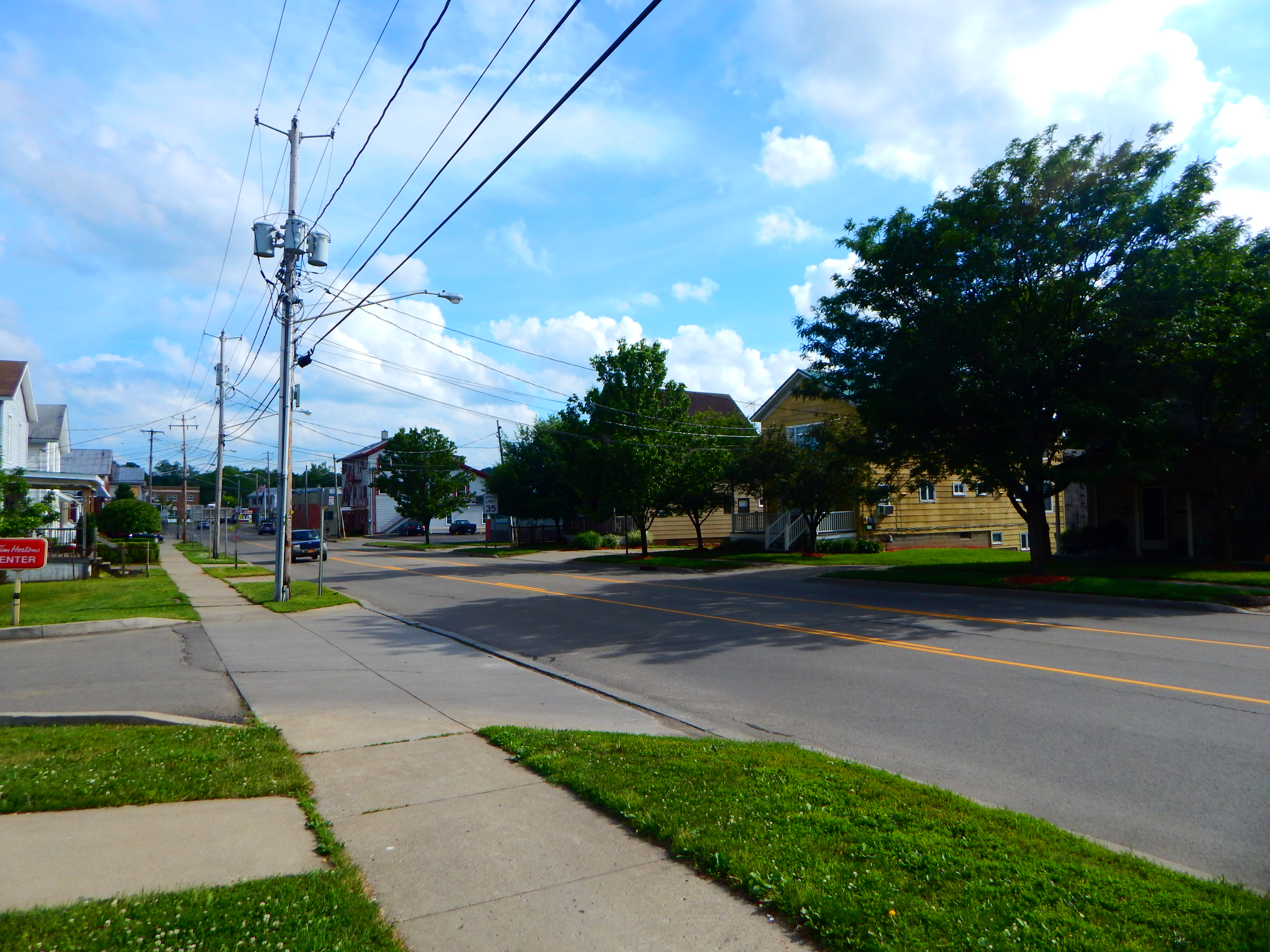
US 62 through Gowanda with NY 39

Despite the change in counties, US 62 and NY 39 remain in the village of Gowanda. The routes leave Main Street on the eastern riverbank and become Buffalo Street as they head north through the village. Outside of the village center, Buffalo Street widens to include a center turn lane. The extra lane remains until the junction of Buffalo Street and Sandhill Road. Here, Buffalo Street becomes NY 438 while US 62 and NY 39 veer eastward onto Sandhill Road. The routes turn northward at the village limits and remain conjoined to the hamlet of Collins, where NY 39 leaves US 62 on Main Street.

US 62 continues north through the largely rural towns of Collins and North Collins to the village of North Collins, located in the extreme northwestern corner of the town. Inside the village, US 62 connects to NY 249. Past North Collins, US 62 heads through the town of Eden as well as the large hamlet of the same name contained within. Northeast of the hamlet of Eden, the route crosses over the south branch of 18 Mile Creek and intersects NY 75, where the routes join and head northward into the village of Hamburg.

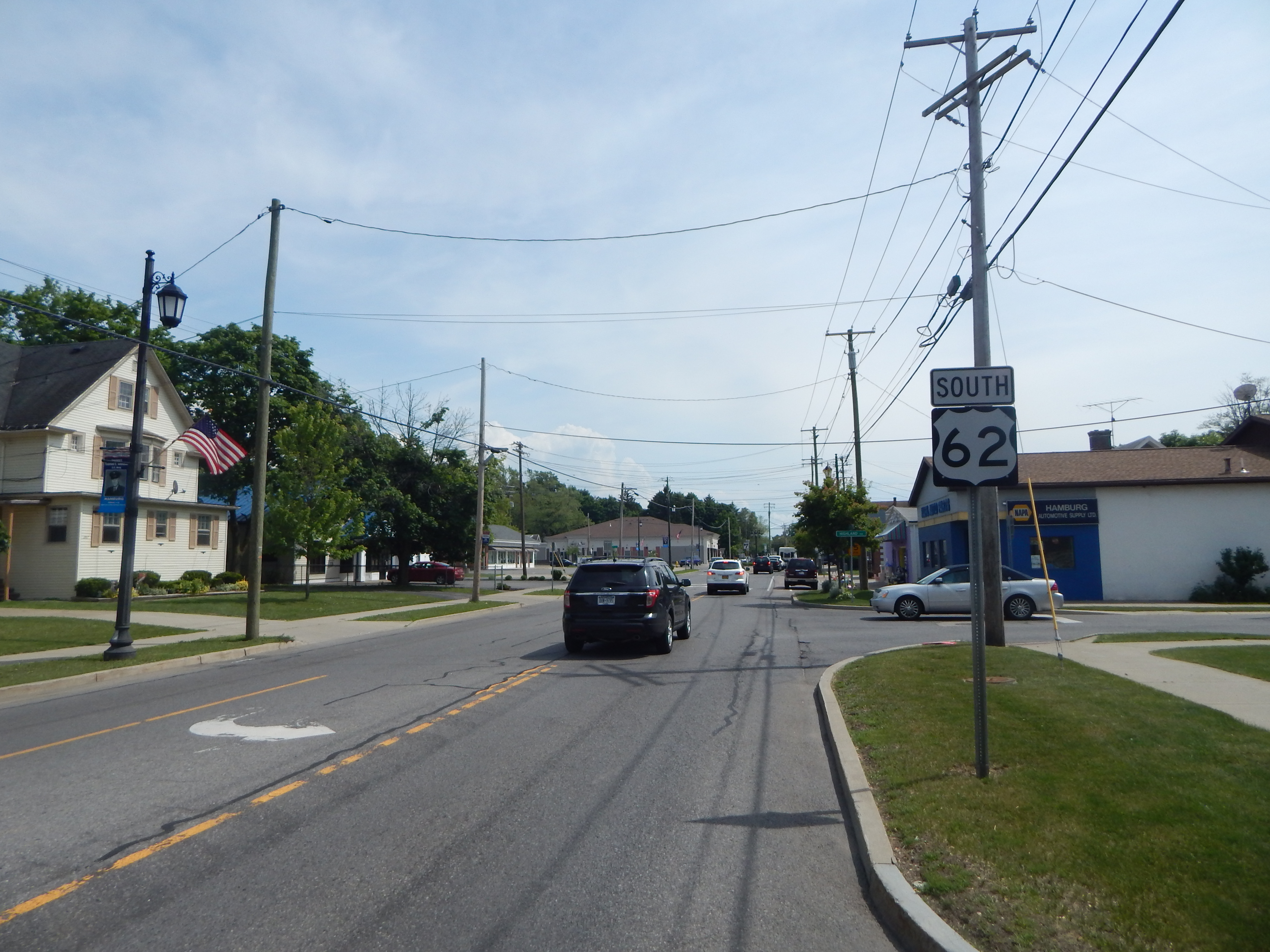
US 62 through Hamburg

In Hamburg, the most developed location along the route since Gowanda, US 62 and NY 75 initially head north on Pierce Avenue. At Main Street, the concurrency ends as US 62 turns east to follow Main through the village center. It remains on Main Street up to Buffalo Street, where it intersects NY 391 by way of a roundabout. East of the roundabout, Main Street becomes NY 391; US 62, meanwhile, follows Buffalo Street through the northern portion of Hamburg and into the surrounding town of the same name, where it becomes South Park Avenue.

The amount of development alongside the roadway remains high, reflecting its close proximity to the city of Buffalo. As it heads north, US 62 passes by the Erie County Fairgrounds and Hilbert College and crosses over the New York State Thruway (I-90) before intersecting with Southwestern Boulevard (US 20). North of US 20, US 62 parallels the Thruway northward to the village of Blasdell, located on the border of Hamburg and the city of Lackawanna. Here, US 62 meets Milestrip Road (NY 179) in the southeastern part of the community.

The route continues onward through Blasdell and into Lackawanna, intersecting Ridge Road, an east–west arterial linking US 62 to NY 5 (Hamburg Turnpike), US 219 and the Thruway. Just northwest of the Ridge Road junction are the Buffalo and Erie County Botanical Gardens, situated on the Lackawanna side of the Lackawanna–Buffalo city line. US 62 serves as the primary access road to the grounds, then enters Buffalo.

==== Buffalo to Niagara Falls ====
This area of the city, known as South Buffalo, is predominantly a working-class Irish American neighborhood, once heavily industrialized. Route 62 turns slightly northwest at Southside Parkway. At Abbott Road, US 62 becomes Bailey Avenue. Across the Buffalo River from Abbott Road is Seneca Street (NY 16), which provides access to I-190. The Interstate Highway can also be reached via the intersection with Clinton Street (NY 354), a few blocks to the north. After passing William Street, Bailey Avenue begins to run along the city's eastern border with Cheektowaga.

North of these junctions, the road passes through the city's industrial East Side, then back into residential neighborhoods where it intersects Broadway, the western terminus of NY 130. After the densely developed neighborhoods where Walden Avenue and Genesee Street intersect, it crosses under the Kensington Expressway (NY 33), where other local roads provide access. A few miles further on, at SUNY Buffalo's city campus, US 62 intersects Main Street (NY 5) at the northeast corner of the city and enters the town of Amherst.

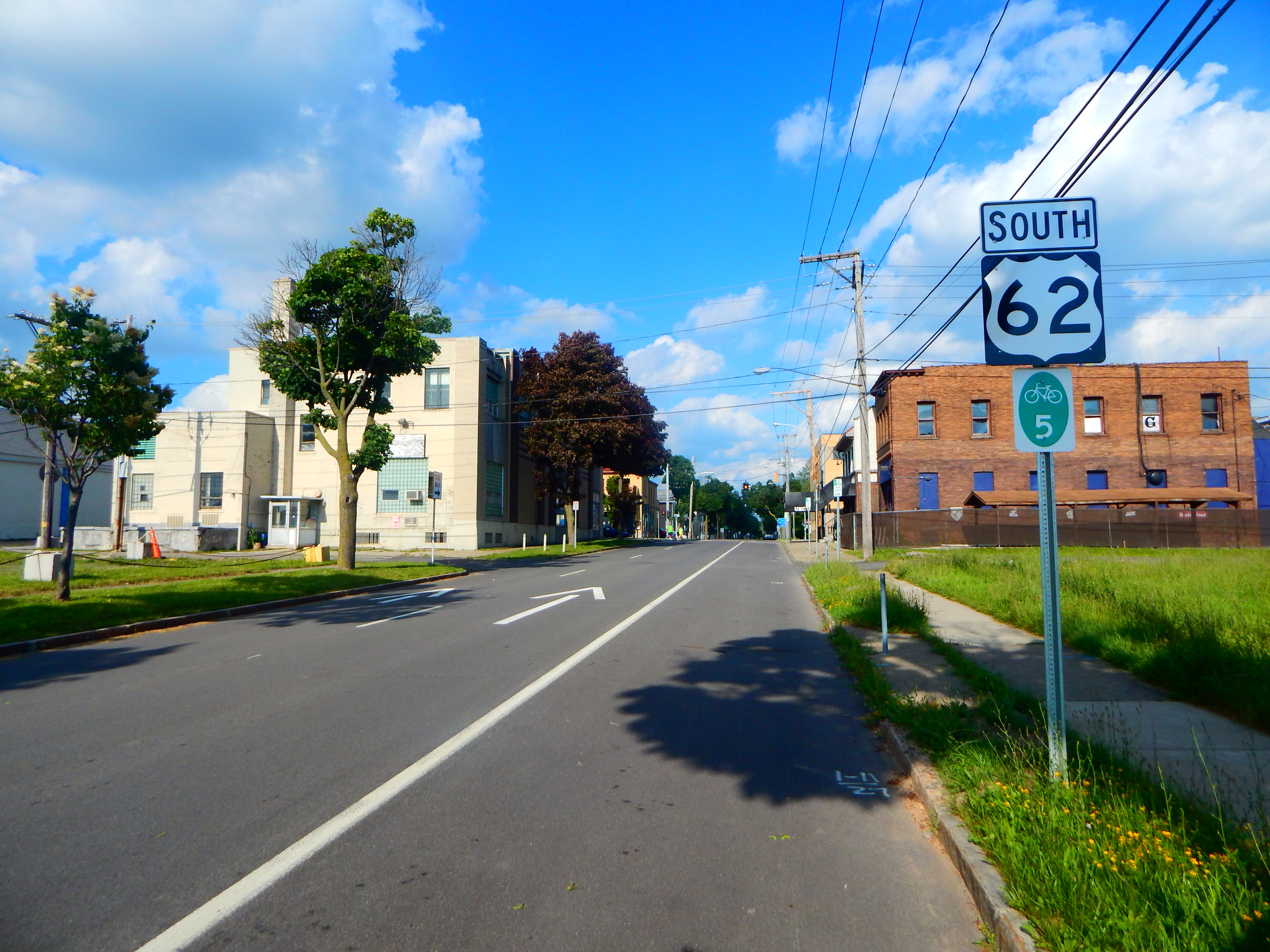
US 62 southbound from NY 104 in Niagara Falls

Less than a mile beyond Main, Grover Cleveland Highway (NY 263) veers off to the northeast. US 62 continues north through heavily suburban territory to the junction with Sheridan Drive (NY 324), a major commercial strip across Buffalo's northern suburbs, where it leaves Bailey Avenue and heads west for a half-mile (0.8 km) to another major junction, Niagara Falls Boulevard, at the Amherst–Tonawanda town line, where it turns north again, following the Boulevard (as it is locally known) past Boulevard Mall at the junction with Maple and Brighton Roads, then through another commercial strip to I-290.

North of the expressway, the road becomes less heavily developed. At the Ellicott Creek crossing, some signs for the former NY 356 are still visible. A short distance further on, as Tonawanda Creek starts to run parallel to the highway, all the land to the west becomes part of Amherst. Two miles to the north, after passing White Chapel Memorial Park, US 62 crosses the creek into Niagara County. Now in Wheatfield, US 62 begins to turn to the northwest as it intersects NY 425 outside of North Tonawanda. The route continues through residential areas of Wheatfield to the town of Niagara, meeting NY 429 along the way.

In Niagara, the properties along the highway become more industrial as US 62 approaches Niagara Falls International Airport. Just south of the airport, the route intersects both Williams Road (unsigned NY 952V) and Porter Road (NY 182). West of NY 182, US 62 dips southwest and enters the city of Niagara Falls, where US 62 initially passes by a mixture of commercial and residential developments, then meets NY 265 (Military Road) in the easternmost part of the city ahead of a junction with I-190 exit 22, a mile (1.6 km) to the west.

Past I-190, US 62 enters a more industrialized section of the city as it approaches the eastern terminus of US 62 Business, its business route through the Pine Avenue commercial district. Upon intersecting Packard Road, a local northeast–southwest arterial situated just east of Pine Avenue, US 62 splits into a one-way couplet to serve the residential portion of downtown Niagara Falls. US 62 travels into the city (northbound) on Walnut Avenue and out (southbound) on Ferry Avenue and both intersect Hyde Park Boulevard (NY 61) near the eastern end of the couplet, which continues west for roughly 1.75 miles (2.82 km) to NY 104 (Main Street), where US 62 terminates northeast of the city's tourism district and the Rainbow Bridge to Canada.

== History ==
=== Early designations ===
In 1908, the New York State Legislature created Route 18, an unsigned legislative route extending from the Pennsylvania state line in Ripley to the village of Youngstown by way of the cities of Buffalo, North Tonawanda, and Niagara Falls. Route 18 did not enter the Buffalo city limits. It ended at the southern city line and resumed at the junction of Kenmore Avenue—which straddles the northern boundary of the city—and Niagara Falls Boulevard. It then followed Niagara Falls Boulevard northwest to Niagara Falls, where it continued to Main Street by way of Pine Avenue.

When the first set of routes in the modern state highway system were assigned in 1924, the northern segment of Route 18 was designated as part of NY 34. The route also extended a short distance southward into Buffalo to end at NY 5A (later NY 5). Also assigned in 1924 was NY 18, a route that began at the Pennsylvania state line north of Bradford, Pennsylvania, and passed through Salamanca, Dayton, and Hamburg on its way to its northern terminus in Buffalo.

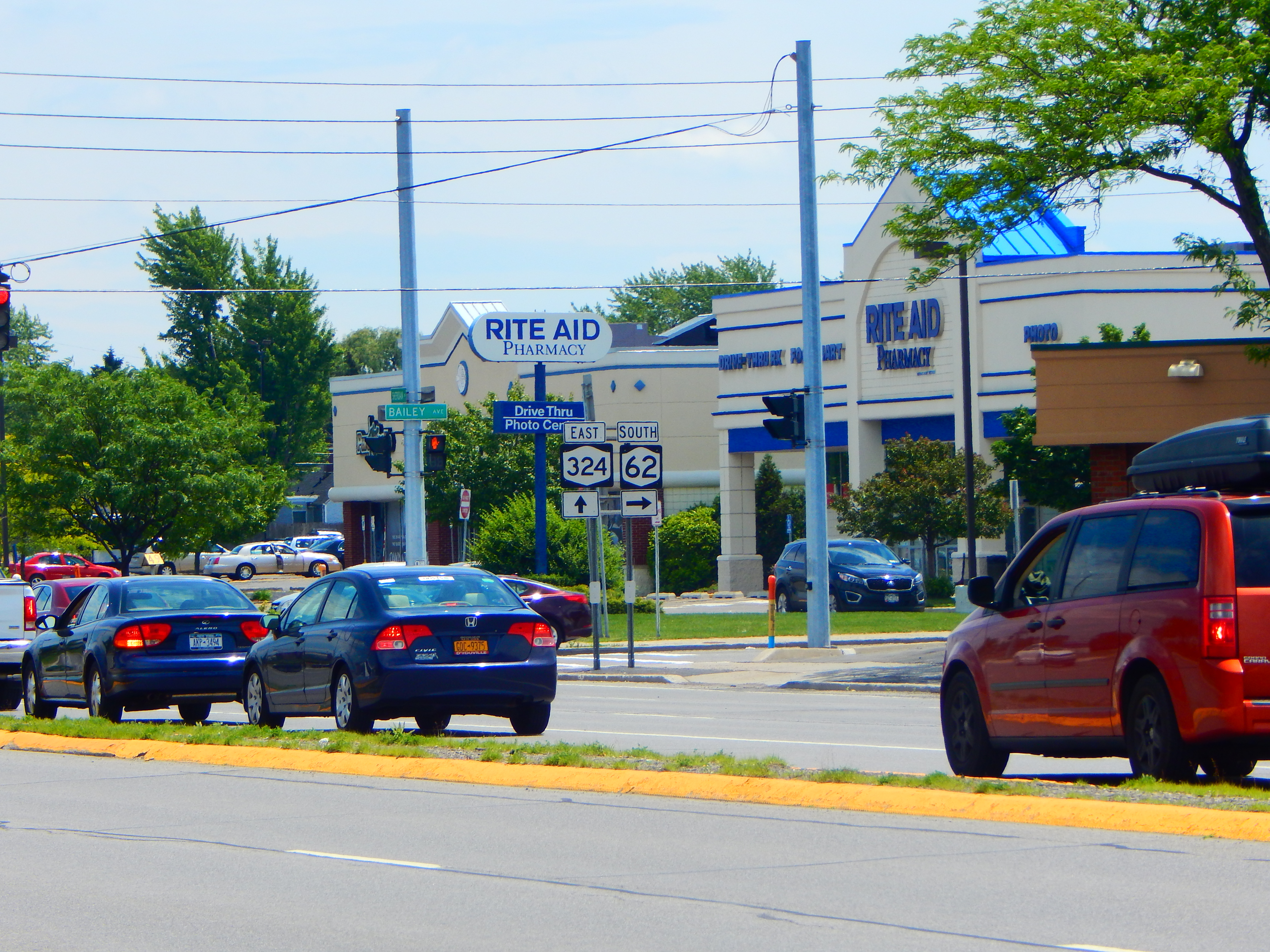
Several erroneous "NY 62" shields exist along US 62, this one in Amherst along NY 324

In the 1930 renumbering of state highways in New York, NY 34 became part of NY 18, which was extended north through Buffalo by way of an overlap with NY 5 along Main Street. Meanwhile, two highways in the Southern Tier—NY 83 and NY 241—were created as part of the renumbering. NY 241 led from NY 18 in Dayton south to Randolph, while NY 83 followed a roughly parallel routing to NY 241 from Frewsburg to Silver Creek. In Frewsburg, NY 83 ended at NY 60, a route assigned in the mid-1920s that extended from Pennsylvania to Fredonia via Frewsburg and Jamestown.

=== Extension of US 62 into New York ===
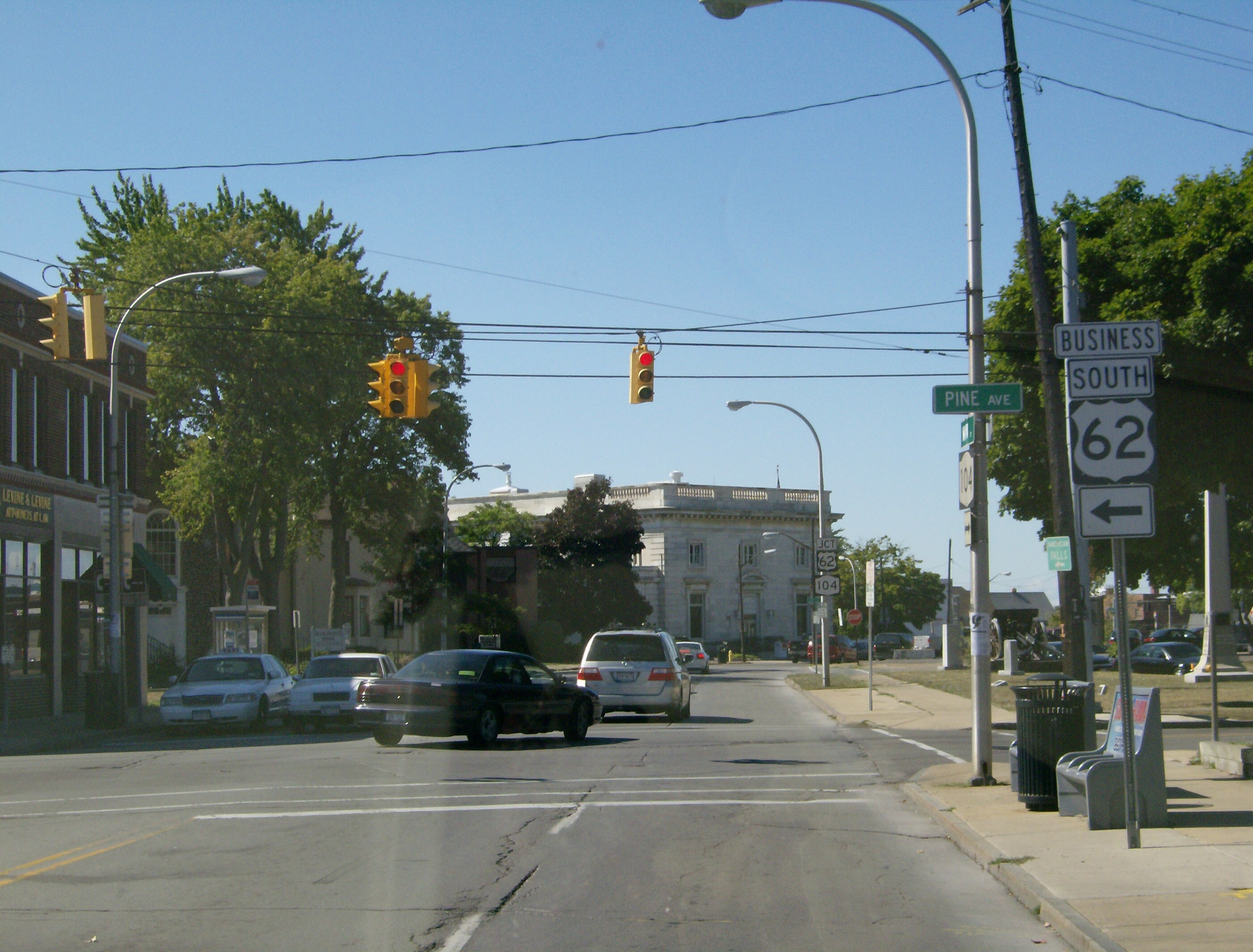
The original northern terminus of US 62 at Main Street (now NY 104) in Niagara Falls, now the northern terminus of US 62 Business

US 62 originally ended in Maysville, Kentucky, when it was assigned in 1930. It was extended northeast through Ohio, Pennsylvania, and western New York to Niagara Falls c. 1932. In New York, US 62 overlapped NY 60 and NY 83 to Conewango Valley, then veered east onto a previously unnumbered highway to Conewango, where it became concurrent with NY 241 and NY 18 north through Dayton, Hamburg, and Buffalo to Niagara Falls.

By 1935, US 62 and NY 18 were realigned through Buffalo to bypass downtown on Bailey Avenue. The two routes then overlapped NY 5 southwest on Main Street for roughly 0.5 miles (0.8 km) to reach Niagara Falls Boulevard.

The overlaps between US 62 and the pre-existing state highways it followed were gradually eliminated over the course of the next three decades. NY 60 and NY 83 were truncated in the 1940s to Frewsburg and Conewango Valley, respectively. NY 241, meanwhile, was cut back to Conewango in the late 1940s. The overlap with NY 18, the longest of the four initial overlaps, remained until January 1, 1962, when NY 18 was truncated to Lewiston (north of Niagara Falls) c. 1962.

=== Realignments ===
US 62 has been realigned in three locations since the 1930s. In southern Amherst, a suburb just north of Buffalo, it was realigned slightly in the late 1930s to continue north on Bailey Avenue past Main Street to Eggert Road. The route then turned northwest onto Eggert to rejoin its former alignment on Niagara Falls Boulevard. It was rerouted further c. 1962 to follow Bailey to Sheridan Drive, where it overlapped NY 324 west along Sheridan to its junction with Niagara Falls Boulevard. The former routing of US 62 along Niagara Falls Boulevard from the Buffalo city line to NY 324 is now NY 950K, an unsigned reference route 1.57 miles (2.53 km) in length.

Farther north in Niagara Falls, US 62 was shifted south in the mid-1960s from Pine Street onto Walnut and Ferry avenues, which had been transformed into a one-way couplet. Its former routing on Pine Avenue was designated as NY 62A in the early 1970s and redesignated as US 62 Business in 2006.

In Chautauqua County, construction began in the mid-1960s on a new alignment for US 62 between the Pennsylvania state line and NY 60 between Stillwater and Frewsburg. The highway opened to traffic as a realignment of US 62 by 1973. As a result, NY 60 was truncated to its junction with the new US 62 roadway and the routing of former NY 60 to Frewsburg became part of US 62 on July 1, 1972. The original routing of US 62 from the state line to Frewsburg is now maintained by Chautauqua County as CR 53.

== US 62 Business ==
U.S. Route 62 Business
- Location: Niagara Falls
- Length: 2.12 mi (3.41 km)
- Existed: 2006–present

U.S. Route 62 Business (US 62 Business) is a business route of US 62 in the city of Niagara Falls. It runs east–west for 2.12 miles (3.41 km) along Pine Avenue from NY 104 in downtown Niagara Falls to US 62 east of the city center. US 62 Business was assigned in 2006; prior to that time, it was NY 62A and, before that, the former routing of US 62 through Niagara Falls.

== Major intersections ==
County	Location	mi	km	Destinations	Notes
Chautauqua	Kiantone	0.00	0.00	US 62 south – Warren	Continuation into Pennsylvania
Chautauqua	Kiantone	4.53	7.29	NY 60 north – Dunkirk, Jamestown	Southern terminus of NY 60
Chautauqua	Poland	15.19	24.45	I-86 / NY 17 / Southern Tier Expressway – Jamestown, Corning	Exit 14 on I-86 / NY 17
Chautauqua	Poland	16.31	26.25	NY 394 west	Southern terminus of NY 394 overlap; hamlet of Kennedy
Chautauqua	Poland	17.41	28.02	NY 394 east	Northern terminus of NY 394 overlap
Chautauqua	Ellington	25.44	40.94	NY 83 north – Fredonia	Southern terminus of NY 83; hamlet of Conewango Valley
Cattaraugus	Conewango	26.99	43.44	NY 241 south – Randolph, Salamanca	Northern terminus of NY 241; hamlet of Conewango
Cattaraugus	Dayton	35.81	57.63	NY 322 west – South Dayton	Eastern terminus of NY 322
Cattaraugus	Dayton	40.76	65.60	NY 353 south – Salamanca	Northern terminus of NY 353; hamlet of Dayton
Cattaraugus	Gowanda	45.36	73.00	NY 39 west	Southern terminus of NY 39 overlap
Erie	Gowanda	46.09	74.17	NY 438 west – Silver Creek	Eastern terminus of NY 438
Erie	Collins	47.93	77.14	NY 39 east – Collins, Springville	Northern terminus of NY 39 overlap; hamlet of Collins
Erie	Village of North Collins	54.93	88.40	NY 249 – Langford, Farnham	
Erie	Eden	63.16	101.65	NY 75 south	Southern terminus of NY 75 overlap
Erie	Village of Hamburg	65.10	104.77	NY 75 north to I-90 / New York Thruway	Northern terminus of NY 75 overlap
Erie	Village of Hamburg	65.60	105.57	NY 391 south	Northern terminus of NY 391
Erie	Town of Hamburg	68.97	111.00	US 20	
Erie	Town of Hamburg	69.53	111.90	Big Tree Road (NY 951E east)	Western terminus of unsigned NY 951E; roundabout
Erie	Blasdell	70.73	113.83	NY 179 (Mile Strip Expressway) to I-90 / New York Thruway	
Erie	Buffalo	76.30	122.79	NY 16 to I-190 west	
Erie	Buffalo	76.73	123.48	NY 354 to I-190 east	
Erie	Buffalo	78.55	126.41	NY 130 east / Broadway (NY 954L west)	Western terminus of NY 130; eastern terminus of unsigned NY 954L
Erie	Buffalo	79.63	128.15	Genesee Street	Former NY 33B
Erie	Buffalo	81.00	130.36	NY 33 west (Kensington Expressway)	Access via Berwyn Avenue
Erie	Buffalo–Amherst line	82.87	133.37	NY 5	
Erie	Amherst	83.12	133.77	NY 263 north	Southern terminus of NY 263
Erie	Amherst	84.30	135.67	NY 324 east	Southern terminus of NY 324 overlap
Erie	Amherst–Tonawanda line	84.76	136.41	NY 324 west / Niagara Falls Boulevard (NY 950K south)	Northern terminus of NY 324 overlap; northern terminus of unsigned NY 950K
Erie	Amherst–Tonawanda line	86.35	138.97	I-290	Exit 3 (I-290)
Erie	Amherst–Tonawanda line	87.76	141.24	Ellicott Creek Road	Former NY 356
Niagara	North Tonawanda	90.42	145.52	NY 425	
Niagara	Wheatfield	93.79	150.94	NY 429	Hamlet of St. Johnsburg
Niagara	Wheatfield	96.58	155.43	Williams Road (NY 952V south)	Northern terminus of unsigned NY 952V
Niagara	Niagara	96.61	155.48	NY 182 west	Eastern terminus of NY 182
Niagara	Niagara Falls	98.12	157.91	NY 265	
Niagara	Niagara Falls	99.30	159.81	I-190	Exit 22 (I-190)
Niagara	Niagara Falls	100.37	161.53	US 62 Bus. west	Eastern terminus of US 62 Bus.; former NY 62A
Niagara	Niagara Falls	101.02	162.58	NY 61	
Niagara	Niagara Falls	102.77	165.39	NY 104	National northern terminus
1.000 mi = 1.609 km; 1.000 km = 0.621 mi: Concurrency terminus

== See also ==
- List of county routes in Chautauqua County, New York
- List of county routes in Erie County, New York (129–160)

U.S. Route 62
Previous state: Pennsylvania	New York	Next state: Terminus
