= New York State Route 249 =

State highway in Erie County, New York, US

New York State Route 249
- Map of Erie County in western New York with NY 249 highlighted in red

Route information
- Maintained by NYSDOT
- Length: 13.50 mi (21.73 km)
- Existed: 1930–present

Major junctions
- West end: NY 5 in Farnham
- US 20 in Brant; US 62 in North Collins village
- East end: NY 75 in North Collins town

Location
- Country: United States
- State: New York
- Counties: Erie

Highway system
- New York Highways; Interstate; US; State; Reference; Parkways
← NY 248A	→ NY 250

New York State Route 249 (NY 249) is a 13.50-mile (21.73 km) long state highway located within Erie County, New York, in the United States. It runs east–west across southwestern Erie County from the shores of Lake Erie in the village of Farnham to the hamlet of Langford in the town of North Collins. The route was designated as NY 249 in the 1930 renumbering of state highways in New York from Farnham to the village of North Collins. By the next year, the route was extended to its current length.

== Route description ==
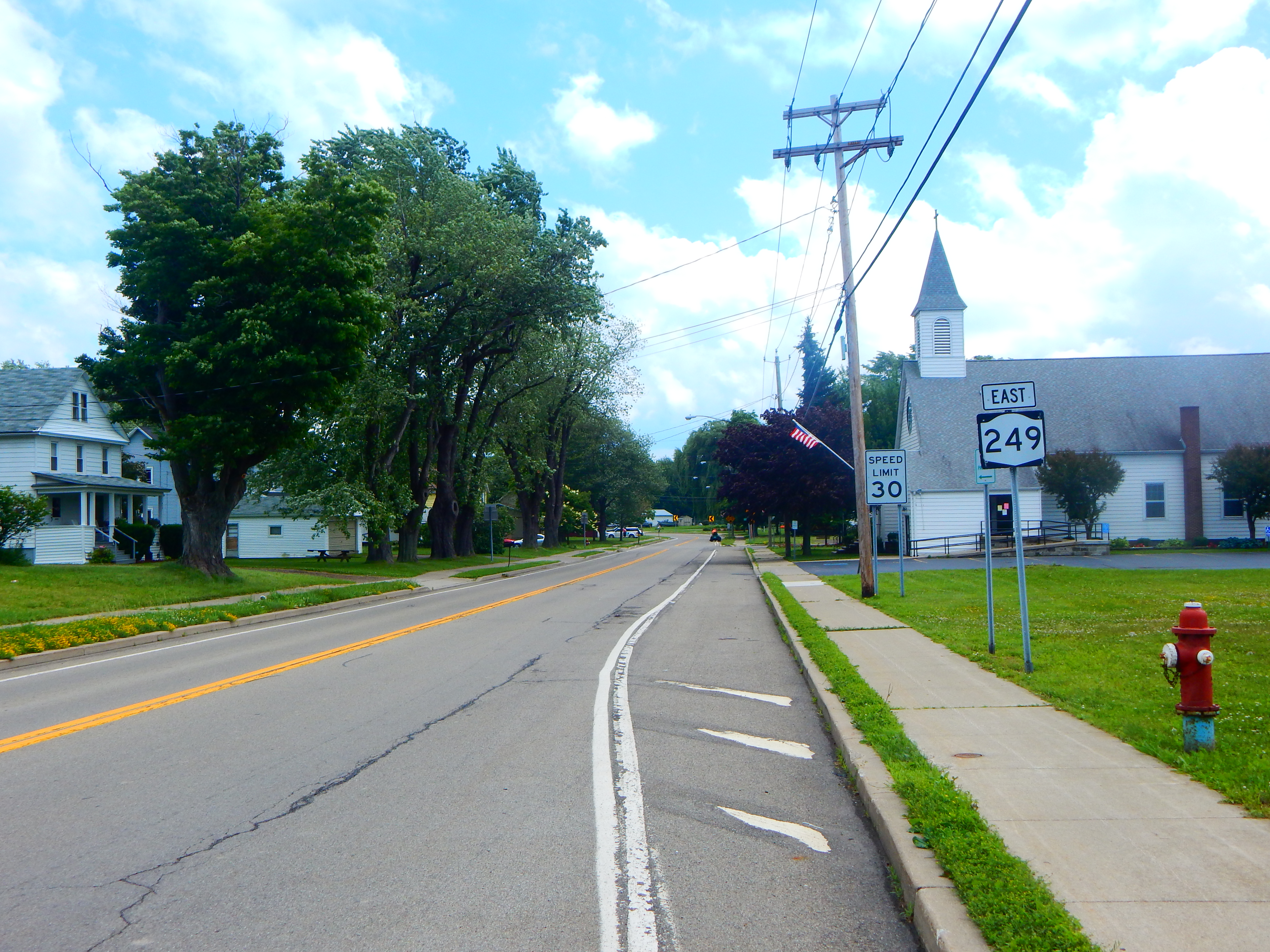
NY 249 east, leaving NY 5 in Farnham

NY 249 begins at a junction with NY 5 (the Seaway Trail / Erie Road) and County Route 34 (CR 34; Lotus Point Road) in the village of Farnham, located in the town of Brant. NY 249 proceeds eastward away from NY 5 as a two-lane residential road, crossing east through Farnham as Commercial Street. The route crosses under tracks owned by CSX Transportation. After the tracks, NY 249 darts southeast, then east through Farnham as a two-lane residential roadway, crossing the eastern village line. In Brant, NY 249 drops the Commercial Street moniker in favor of Brant–Farnham Road, crossing an at-grade intersection with US 20 (Southwestern Boulevard).

After US 20, NY 249 continues eastward on Brant–Farnham Road, crossing under the lanes of the New York State Thruway (I-90), however no interchange is present. After the Thruway, the route crosses south of Brant Town Park as it heads east as a two-lane residential roadway. Approaching the hamlet of Brant, NY 249 intersects with the southern terminus of CR 492 (Hardpan Road). In Brant, NY 249 becomes a two-lane commercial street through the center of town, intersecting with CR 9 (Angola Brant Road). This intersection served as the southern terminus of NY 323 until August 14, 1980. After CR 9, NY 249 continues eastward, changing names to Brant–North Collins Road.and soon winding its way through the rural sections of Erie County.

At the intersection with Versailles Plank Road, NY 249 proceeds northeast, turning east on Brant Road a short distance later, while Versailles Plank Road continues north as CR 41. NY 249 continues eastward along Brant Road, a two-lane farm road, intersecting with CR 546 (Mileblock Road). The route crosses over Big Sister Creek and becomes residential as it enters the village of North Collins, located in the town of the same name. In North Collins, NY 249 becomes Brant Street, a two-lane village street, intersecting with US 62 (Main Street). At this junction, NY 249 leaves Brant Street for Sherman Avenue, crossing multiple residences and over the former Erie Railroad's Buffalo and Southwestern Railroad. At the junction with High Street, NY 249 runs south for a block on High Street, intersecting with Thiel Road, which NY 249 leaves the village of North Collins on. Thiel Road and NY 249 wind southeast as a two-lane residential road, soon intersecting with Langford Road, where NY 249 turns off Thiel into the town of North Collins. The route crosses through a rural section of North Collins, intersecting with CR 501 (Ketchum Road). After CR 501, NY 249 continues eastward on Langford Road, intersecting with CR 486 and CR 487 (Jennings Road). The route crosses over a brook and remains going eastward as it enters the hamlet of Langford. In Langford, NY 249 passes several residences before intersecting with NY 75 (Sisson Highway). This intersection serves as the eastern terminus of NY 249, whose right-of-way continues east as CR 39 (Langford Road) to the hamlet of New Oregon.

== History ==
NY 249 was assigned as part of the 1930 renumbering of state highways in New York. It initially began at U.S. Route 20 (now NY 5) in Farnham and ended at NY 18 (now U.S. Route 62) in North Collins even though the portion of modern NY 249 east of North Collins was also state-maintained as well. NY 249 was extended east to its current eastern terminus at the hamlet of Langford by the following year following the assignment of NY 18A (now part of NY 75).

== Major intersections ==
The entire route is in Erie County.

Location	mi	km	Destinations	Notes
Farnham	0.00	0.00	NY 5 / LECT (Erie Road) / CR 34 (Lotus Point Road) – Silver Creek, Buffalo	Western terminus
Brant	1.70	2.74	US 20 (Southwestern Boulevard) – Silver Creek	
Brant			CR 9 (Angola Brant Road) – Angola	Former southern terminus of NY 323; hamlet of Brant
Village of North Collins	8.17	13.15	US 62 (Main Street)	
Town of North Collins	13.50	21.73	NY 75 (Sisson Highway) / CR 39 (Langford Road) – Hamburg, Collins Center	Eastern terminus; hamlet of Langford
1.000 mi = 1.609 km; 1.000 km = 0.621 mi
