= North Collins, New York =

North Collins, New York Seneca: Heyó꞉ähdöh
- Town
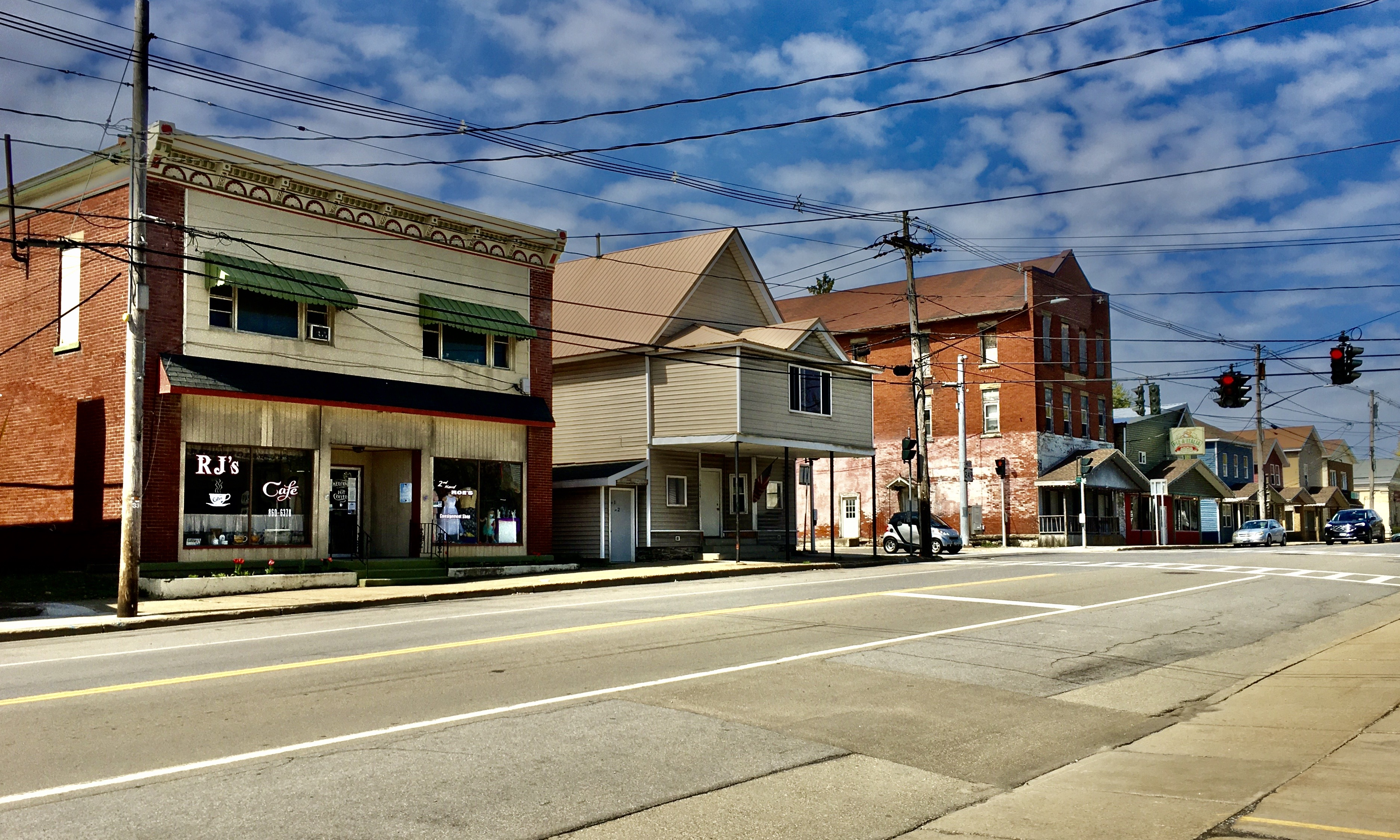
- Gowanda State Road in 2021

- Seal
- Motto: "Looking to the Future; Rooted in the Past"
- Location in Erie County and the state of New York.

- Location of New York in the United States
- Coordinates: 42°35′42″N 78°56′28″W
- Country: United States
- State: New York
- County: Erie County
- Incorporated: 1852

Government
  - Supervisor: John Tobia (GOP) Town Council: Michael W. Perry (R); Marian C. Vanni (D); George C. LoBianco (D); Jeffrey T. Krauss (D)

Area
  - Total: 43.03 sq mi (111.44 km^{2})
  - Land: 42.85 sq mi (110.99 km^{2})
  - Water: 0.17 sq mi (0.45 km^{2})
- Elevation: 827 ft (252 m)

Population (2020)
  - Total: 3,504
  - Density: 81.9/sq mi (31.61/km^{2})
- Time zone: UTC-5 (EST)
  - Summer (DST): UTC-4 (EDT)
- ZIP Codes: 14111 (North Collins); 14091 (Lawtons); 14057 (Eden); 14141 (Springville)
- Area code: 716
- FIPS code: 36-029-51803
- FIPS code: 36-51803
- GNIS feature ID: 0979283
- Website: www.townofnorthcollinsny.gov

North Collins (Seneca: Heyó꞉ähdöh) is a town in Erie County, New York, United States. The population was 3,504 at the 2020 census. The name is derived from its parent town, Collins.

The town of North Collins is in the southern part of the county and is one of the "Southtowns" of Erie County. The main settlement in the town is the village of North Collins.

== History ==
The area was first settled in 1809.

The town of North Collins was founded in 1852 as the "Town of Shirley" from the northern part of the town of Collins. In 1853 the town assumed its current name.

In 1911, the community of North Collins set itself off from the town by incorporating as a village.

The Gamel Hexadecagon Barn was listed on the National Register of Historic Places in 1984.

== Geography ==
According to the United States Census Bureau, the town of North Collins has a total area of 43.0 square miles (111.4 km^{2}), of which 42.9 square miles (111.0 km^{2}) is land and 0.15 square miles (0.4 km^{2}), or 0.40%, is water.

NY 75, NY 249, and US 62 pass through the town.

== Demographics ==
Historical population
Census	Pop.	Note	%±
1860	1,948		—
1870	1,617		−17.0%
1880	1,856		14.8%
1890	2,016		8.6%
1900	2,362		17.2%
1910	2,424		2.6%
1920	2,271		−6.3%
1930	2,522		11.1%
1940	2,550		1.1%
1950	2,943		15.4%
1960	3,805		29.3%
1970	4,090		7.5%
1980	3,791		−7.3%
1990	3,502		−7.6%
2000	3,376		−3.6%
2010	3,523		4.4%
2020	3,504		−0.5%
U.S. Decennial Census

As of the census of 2000, there were 3,376 people, 1,254 households, and 915 families residing in the town. The population density was 78.8 inhabitants per square mile (30.4/km^{2}). There were 1,403 housing units at an average density of 32.7 per square mile (12.6/km^{2}). The racial makeup of the town was 95.26% White, 0.44% Black or African American, 1.51% Native American, 0.71% Asian, 0.44% from other races, and 1.63% from two or more races. Hispanic or Latino of any race were 2.37% of the population.

There were 1,254 households, out of which 32.1% had children under the age of 18 living with them, 59.6% were married couples living together, 8.9% had a female householder with no husband present, and 27.0% were non-families. 22.1% of all households were made up of individuals, and 11.1% had someone living alone who was 65 years of age or older. The average household size was 2.68 and the average family size was 3.16.

In the town, the population was spread out, with 26.2% under the age of 18, 6.6% from 18 to 24, 29.9% from 25 to 44, 23.7% from 45 to 64, and 13.7% who were 65 years of age or older. The median age was 38 years. For every 100 females, there were 98.8 males. For every 100 females age 18 and over, there were 98.6 males.

The median income for a household in the town was $43,781, and the median income for a family was $50,781. Males had a median income of $36,087 versus $26,667 for females. The per capita income for the town was $19,253. About 5.4% of families and 7.7% of the population were below the poverty line, including 12.7% of those under age 18 and 2.4% of those age 65 or over.

== Communities and locations in North Collins ==
- Eighteen Mile Creek (South Branch) – A stream flowing through the northeast part of the town, passing the community of New Oregon. It is a tributary of Lake Erie.
- Franklin Gulf County Park – An undeveloped park partly in the north part of the town.
- Langford – A hamlet at the intersection of NY 75 and NY 249 in the northern part of the town.
- Lawtons – A hamlet on US 62 in the southwest corner of the town.
- Marshfield – A hamlet near the south town line on NY 75.
- New Oregon – A hamlet in the northeast part of the town on NY 249.
- North Collins - The village of North Collins is located in the northwest corner of the town at the junction of US 62 and NY 249. The community was formerly called "Rose's Corners" and "Kerr's Corners".
- Shirley – A hamlet southeast of North Collins village, located on Shirley Road just south of NY 249.
- Winter's Pond – A small lake south of Langford.

== Notable people ==
- Effie A. Southworth (1860-1947), botanist, born in North Collins.
- Frank Manly Thorn (1836–1907), lawyer, politician, government official, essayist, journalist, humorist, and inventor, sixth Superintendent of the United States Coast and Geodetic Survey (1885–1889), born in North Collins before it split away from Collins.

== Plane Crashes ==
June 1956 http://www.gendisasters.com/new-york/11708/north-collins-ny-private-plane-crash-june-1956

October 1958 https://issuesny.tripod.com/home/id109.html (Related) https://issuesny.tripod.com/home/id111.html

September 2016 https://buffalonews.com/news/local/faster-plane-crashed-into-slower-one-over-north-collins-ntsb-finds/article_9199214a-a310-5480-910d-38ddfb54b36e.html
