= Lawtons, New York =

Hamlet in New York, United States

Coordinates: 42°32′17″N 78°55′51″W

Lawtons is a hamlet in the town of North Collins. It is located in southern Erie County, New York, United States.
