= New York State Route 130 =

State highway in Erie County, New York, US

New York State Route 130
- Broadway
- Map of Erie County in western New York with NY 130 highlighted in red and NY 954L in blue

Route information
- Maintained by NYSDOT
- Length: 6.06 mi (9.75 km)
- Existed: c. 1938–present

Major junctions
- West end: US 62 / NY 954L in Buffalo
- East end: US 20 / NY 78 in Depew

Location
- Country: United States
- State: New York
- Counties: Erie

Highway system
- New York Highways; Interstate; US; State; Reference; Parkways
| ← NY 129 | → NY 131 |

New York State Route 130 (NY 130) is a state highway entirely within Erie County, New York, in the United States. It runs east–west from U.S. Route 62 (US 62, named Bailey Avenue) in Buffalo to the village of Depew, where it terminates at US 20 and NY 78 (Transit Road). Throughout this course, NY 130 is named Broadway, a roadway name that continues eastward beyond Depew even after NY 130 ends.

== Route description ==
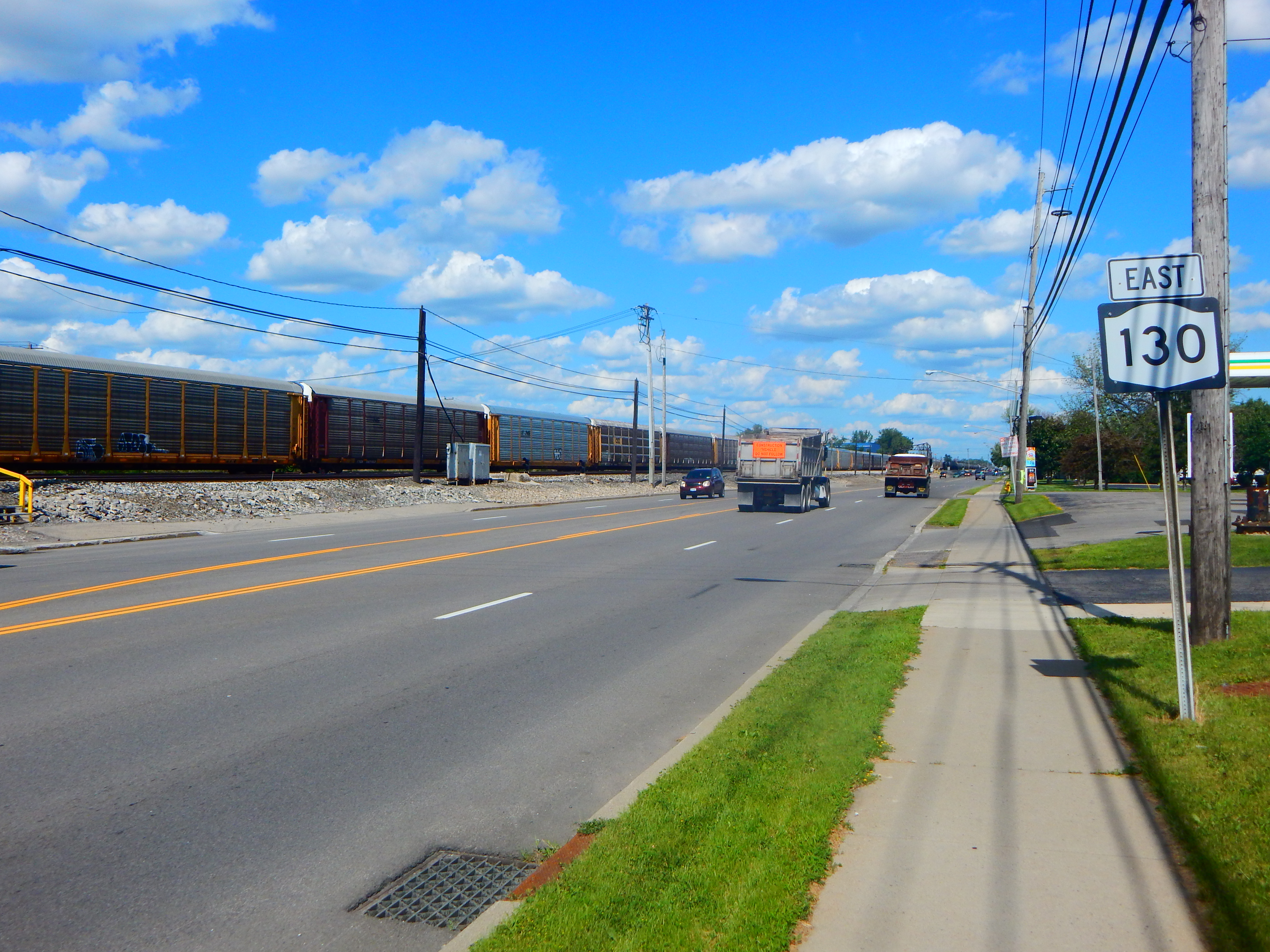
NY 130 eastbound in Cheektowaga

NY 130 begins at an intersection with US 62 (Bailey Avenue) in the East Side of downtown Buffalo as a touring route continuation of Broadway. NY 130 proceeds eastward through Buffalo as a four-lane commercial/industrial roadway on the south side of a railroad yard complex maintained by CSX in Schiller Park. The route bends southeast, crosses under a CSX line also used by Amtrak, soon bending east once again. During this eastern stretch, NY 130 is a residential street to the south in the town of Cheektowaga while running alongside the railroad yard. At the end of the railroad yard, NY 130 intersects with access ramps to NY 240 (Harlem Road). Running northeast through Cheektowaga, NY 130 runs along the railroad line as it proceeds eastward, crossing north of several industrial sites and south of cemeteries.

A short distance later, as NY 130 continues through Cheektowaga, it crosses over the New York State Thruway (I-90) just south of exit 52. Bending eastward, NY 130 enters the hamlet of Forks, where it has a two-quadrant interchange with NY 277 (Union Road). After the interchange, NY 130 bends away from the railroad tracks, running eastward as a four-lane residential/commercial street. Approaching another set of railroad tracks, the route bends northeast alongside, entering the village of Depew, where it intersects with County Route 317 (CR 317; Dick Road), which connects to the Buffalo-Depew Amtrak station. After the junction with CR 317, NY 130 bends southeast, crosses under the second set of railroad tracks and continues east through Depew as Broadway.

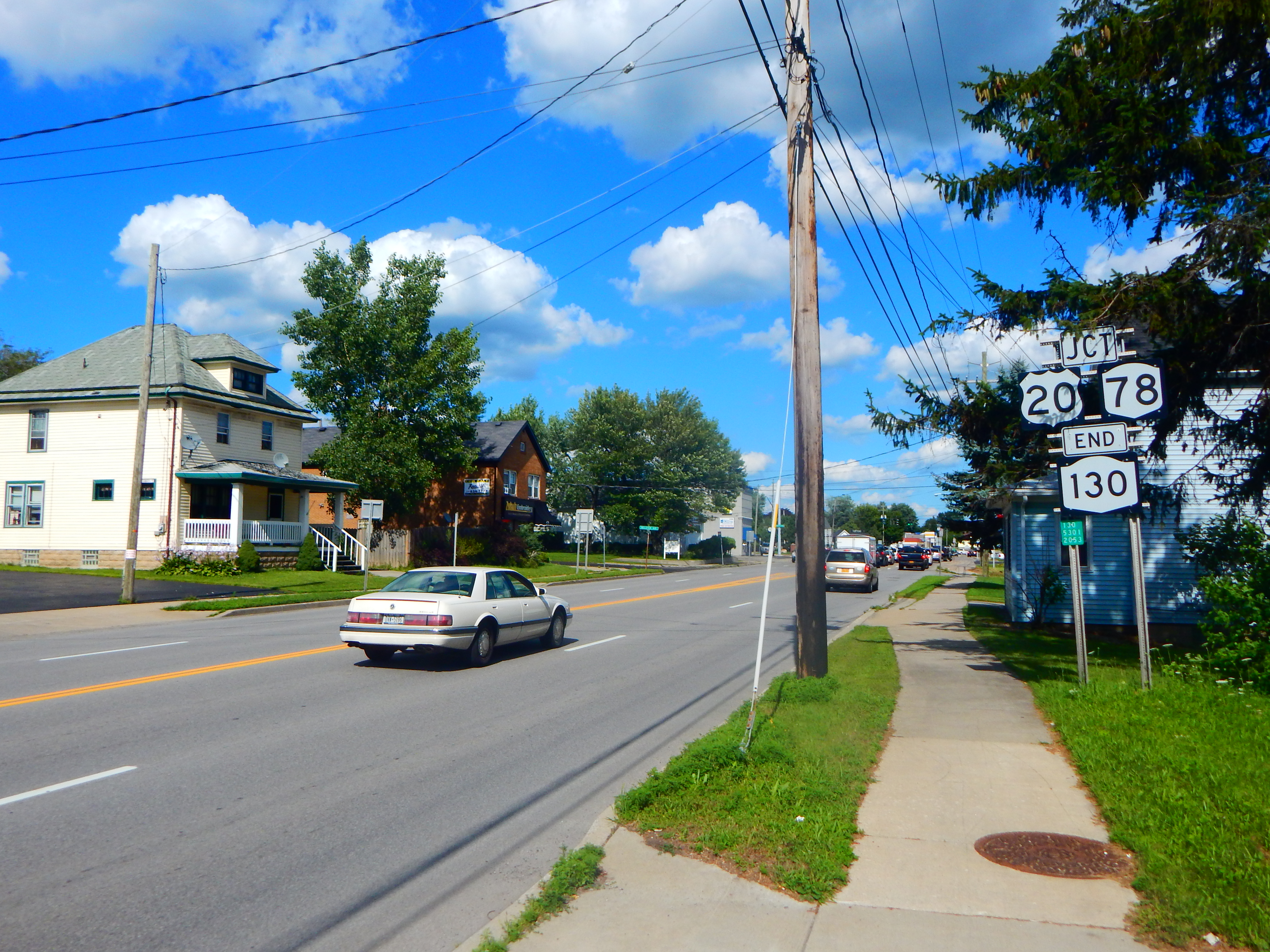
NY 130 eastbound in Depew, approaching NY 78/US 20

NY 130 continues east, passing a large industrial lot before turning southeast once again into a commercial district. At an intersection with CR 322 (Borden Road) and A Street, the route enters downtown Depew. Through downtown Depew, NY 130 is a four-lane residential street, passing several businesses on its way east. As the Cayuga Creek approaches the roadside, NY 130 intersects with US 20 and NY 78 (Transit Road), where NY 130 terminates and US 20 continues east along Broadway.

== History ==
When the first set of posted routes in New York were assigned in 1924, Broadway in Buffalo and points east became part of NY 5, a cross-state highway extending from the Pennsylvania state line northeast of Erie, Pennsylvania, to the Massachusetts state line west of Pittsfield, Massachusetts. By 1926, NY 5 had been shifted northward between Buffalo and Albany to follow what had previously been NY 5A. The former routing of NY 5 between the two cities became NY 7. In 1927, the portion of NY 7 between Buffalo and Canawaugus (west of Avon) was renumbered again to NY 35.

US 20 was assigned in 1927; however, it initially bypassed downtown Buffalo on modern US 20A. It was realigned c. 1938 to enter the eastern suburbs of Buffalo by way of Southwestern Boulevard and Transit Road. At Broadway, US 20 turned east onto what had been NY 35 and exited the city. The former routing of NY 35 to Niagara Square in downtown Buffalo was redesignated as NY 130. NY 130 was truncated to US 62 on July 1, 1974. The former section from Washington Street (four blocks east of Niagara Square) to US 62 is still maintained by NYSDOT as NY 954L, an unsigned reference route.

== Major intersections ==
The entire route is in Erie County.

| Location | mi | km | Destinations | Notes |
|---|---|---|---|---|
| Buffalo | 0.00 | 0.00 | US 62 (Bailey Avenue) / Broadway (NY 954L west) | Western terminus; eastern terminus of unsigned NY 954L |
| Cheektowaga | 1.54 | 2.48 | NY 240 (Harlem Road) – Orchard Park | |
| Cheektowaga | 3.06 | 4.92 | NY 277 (Union Road) to I-90 | Two-quadrant interchange |
| Depew | 6.06 | 9.75 | US 20 / NY 78 (Transit Road / Broadway) | Eastern terminus |
1.000 mi = 1.609 km; 1.000 km = 0.621 mi
