= Shirley, Erie County, New York =

Hamlet in New York, United States

Coordinates: 42°34′36″N 78°54′49″W

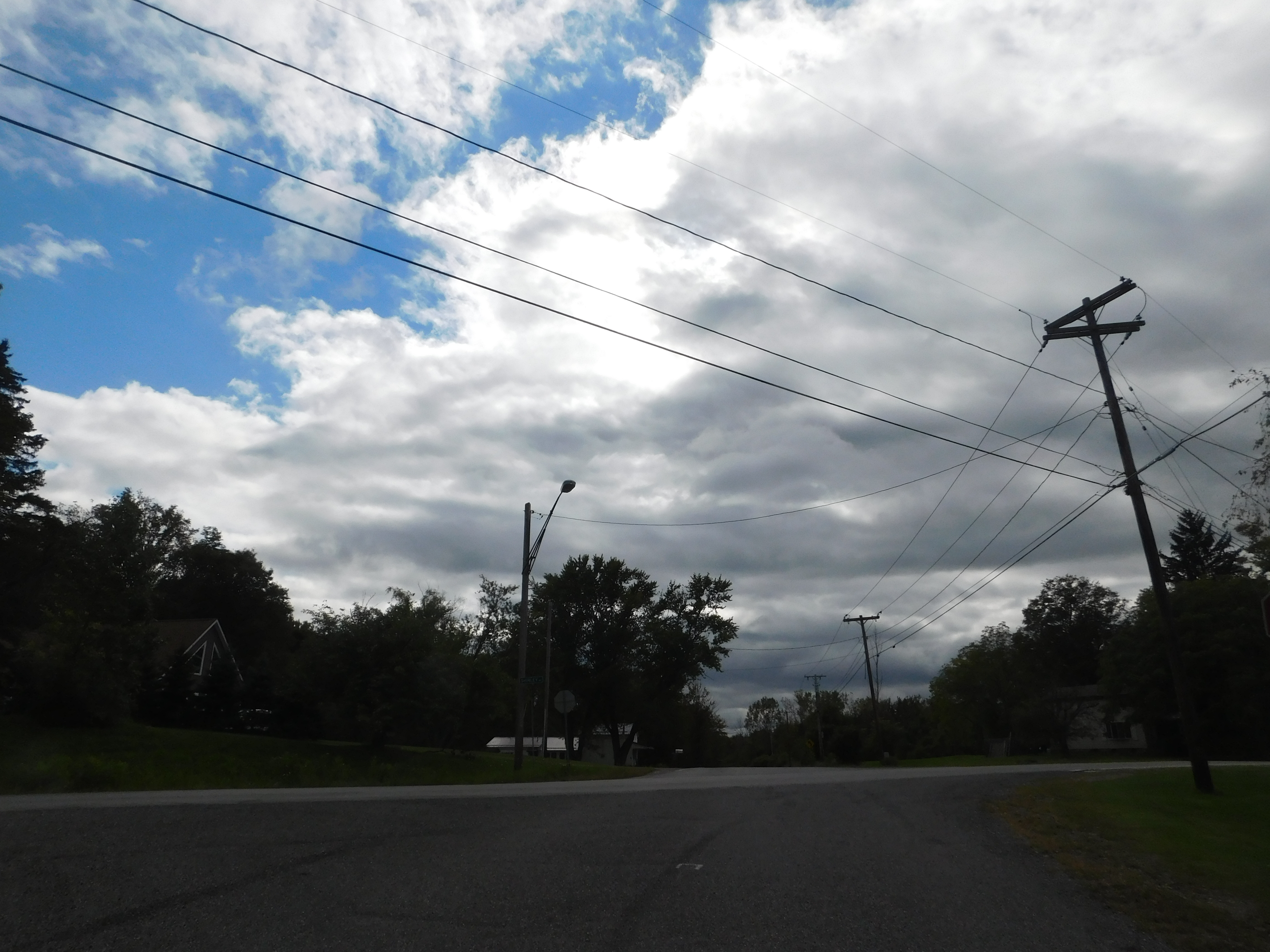
The hamlet of Shirley seen from Angling Road

Shirley is a hamlet in the town of North Collins in southern Erie County, New York, United States.
