= Gamel Hexadecagon Barn =

- U.S. National Register of Historic Places
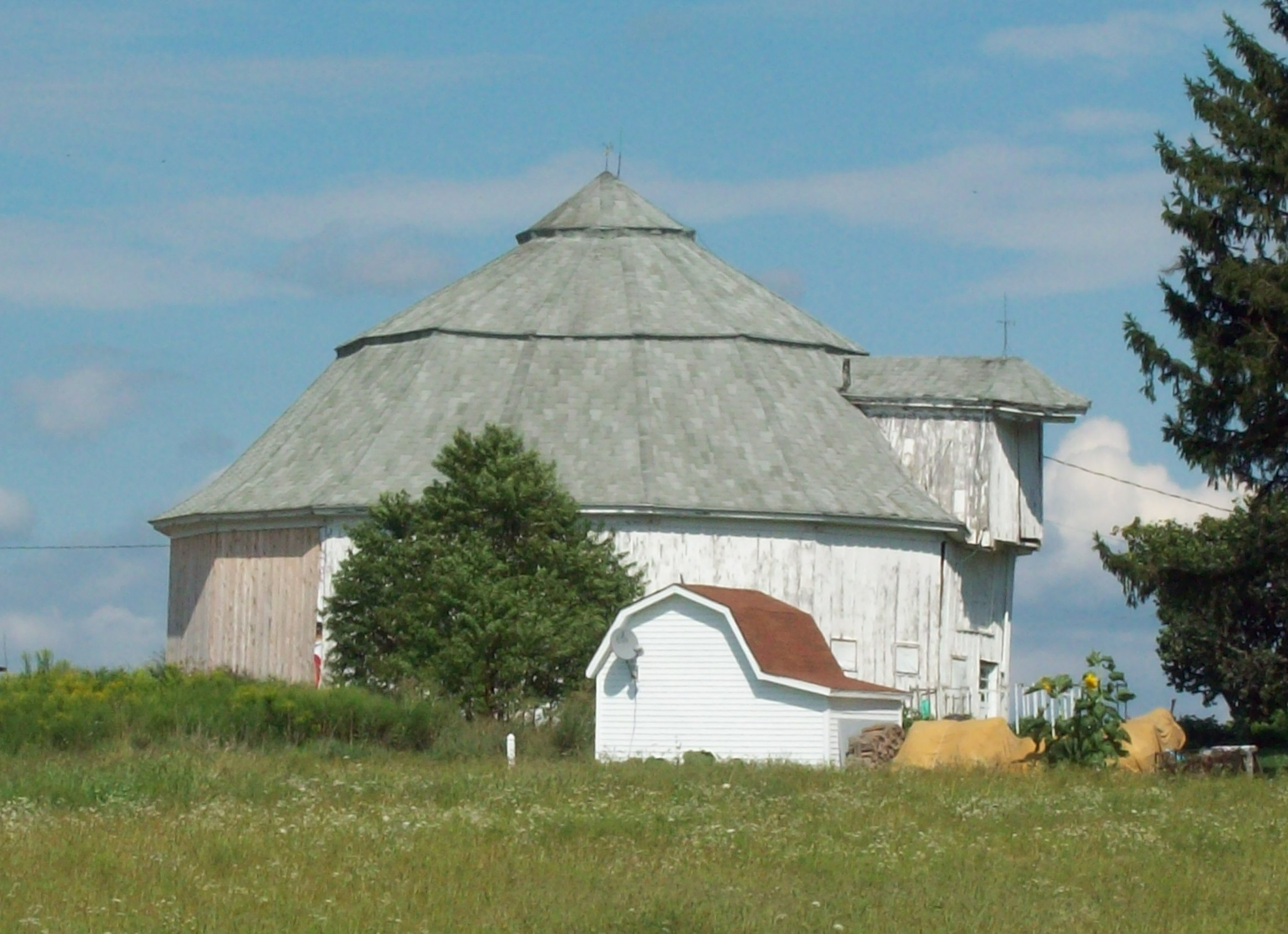
- Gamel Hexadecagon Barn, August 2010

- Location within New York Location within the United States
- Nearest city: North Collins, New York
- Coordinates: 42°34′39″N 78°55′39″W
- Built: 1900
- Architectural style: Hexadecagon
- MPS: Central Plan Dairy Barns of New York TR
- NRHP reference No.: 84002386
- Added to NRHP: September 29, 1984

Gamel Hexadecagon Barn is a historic barn located at North Collins in Erie County, New York. It is a 16-sided barn with a diameter of 80 feet (24 m). It is a two-story frame structure and covered with board and batten siding.

It was listed on the National Register of Historic Places in 1984.

It has a hay hood.
