= Marshfield, New York =

Hamlet in New York, United States

Coordinates: 42°32′34″N 78°50′30″W

Marshfield is a hamlet in the town of North Collins in southern Erie County, New York, United States.
