= North Collins (village), New York =

North Collins, New York Seneca: Heyó꞉ähdöh
- Village
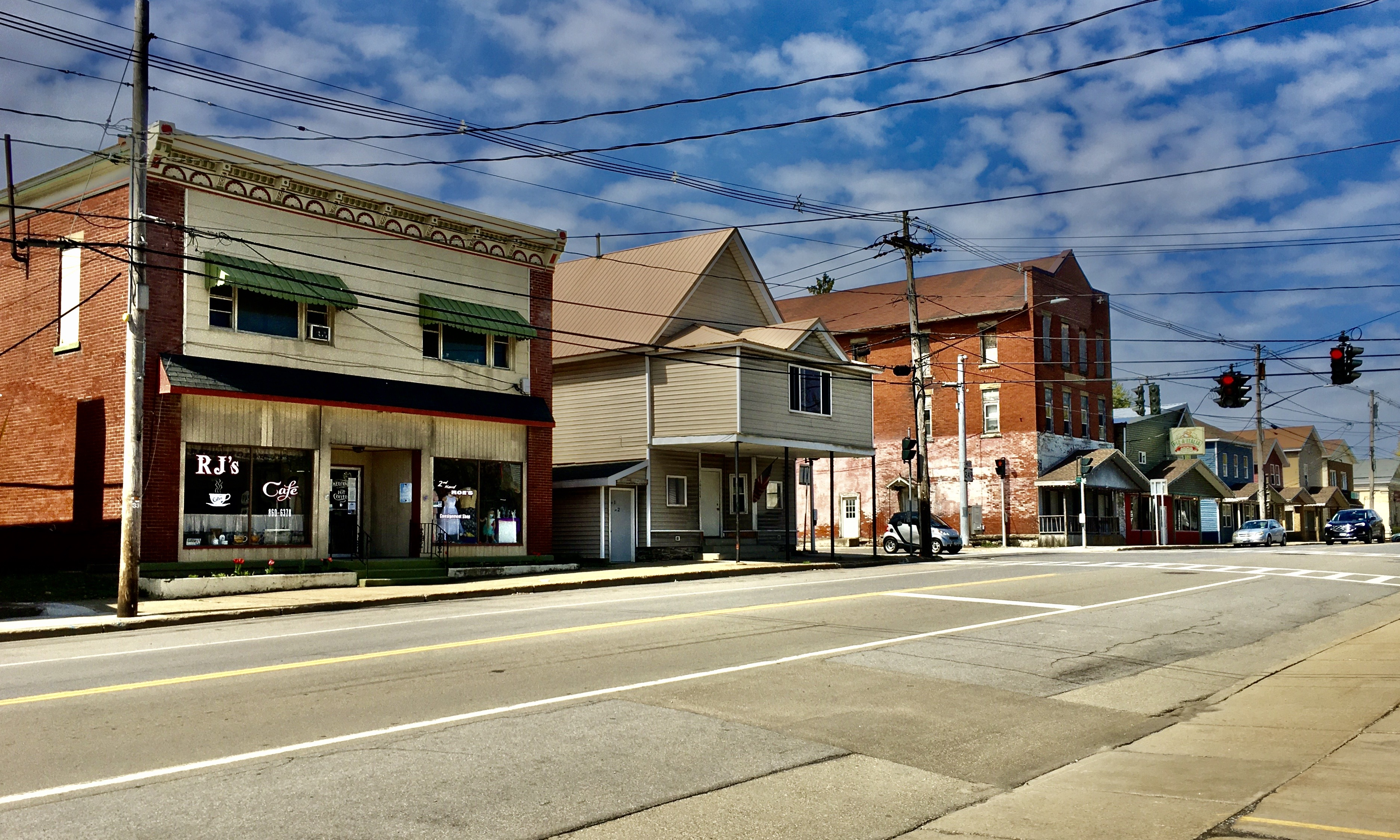
- The village center as seen in April 2021

- Seal

- Location in Erie County and the state of New York
- Coordinates: 42°35′41″N 78°56′15″W
- Country: United States
- State: New York
- County: Erie
- Town: North Collins
- Incorporated: 1911

Area
  - Total: 0.80 sq mi (2.07 km^{2})
  - Land: 0.80 sq mi (2.07 km^{2})
  - Water: 0 sq mi (0.00 km^{2})
- Elevation: 827 ft (252 m)

Population (2020)
  - Total: 1,247
  - Density: 1,556.7/sq mi (601.05/km^{2})
- Time zone: UTC-5 (Eastern (EST))
  - Summer (DST): UTC-4 (EDT)
- ZIP code: 14111
- Area code: 716
- FIPS code: 36-51792
- GNIS feature ID: 0958754
- Website: www.villageofnorthcollins.org

North Collins (Seneca: Heyó꞉ähdöh) is a village in Erie County, New York, United States. The population was 1,255 at the 2021 census. The village is in the northwest corner of the town of North Collins.

== History ==
The community was formerly known as "Rose's Corners" and "Kerr's Corners". The village of North Collins was incorporated in 1911, setting itself off from the town of North Collins.

In May 2008, the village board agreed to move toward dissolution of the village and become again part of the town of North Collins. The resolution presented to the people did not pass and the Village remains a Village.

== Athletic tradition ==
The town has produced some notable athletes. Perhaps the best-known is Marion Fricano, a former major league baseball player who played for the Philadelphia/Kansas City Athletics (now Oakland Athletics) from 1952 to 1955. His most notable achievement was breaking up a no-hitter with a bunt.

North Collins High School is a Class D member of Section VI of the NYSPHSAA. Since 1960, the boys soccer team has won 23 sectional titles, as well as the state championship in 1994.

== Geography ==
According to the United States Census Bureau, the village has a total area of 0.8 square miles (2.1 km^{2}), all land.

U.S. Route 62 (Main Street) and New York State Route 249 (Brant Road/Sherman Avenue) pass through the village.

== Demographics ==
Historical population
Census	Pop.	Note	%±
1880	421		—
1890	636		51.1%
1920	1,158		—
1930	1,165		0.6%
1940	1,182		1.5%
1950	1,325		12.1%
1960	1,574		18.8%
1970	1,675		6.4%
1980	1,496		−10.7%
1990	1,335		−10.8%
2000	1,079		−19.2%
2010	1,232		14.2%
2020	1,247		1.2%
U.S. Decennial Census

At the 2000 census there were 1,079 people, 414 households, and 284 families living in the village. The population density was 1,347.8 inhabitants per square mile (520.4/km^{2}). There were 494 housing units at an average density of 617.1 per square mile (238.3/km^{2}). The racial makeup of the village was 89.71% White, 1.20% Black or African American, 3.80% Native American, 1.30% Asian, 1.20% from other races, and 2.78% from two or more races. Hispanic or Latino of any race were 5.19%.

Of the 414 households 34.5% had children under the age of 18 living with them, 51.0% were married couples living together, 12.6% had a female householder with no husband present, and 31.2% were non-families. 25.1% of households were one person and 11.4% were one person aged 65 or older. The average household size was 2.58 and the average family size was 3.11.

The age distribution was 27.9% under the age of 18, 6.3% from 18 to 24, 31.9% from 25 to 44, 20.7% from 45 to 64, and 13.3% 65 or older. The median age was 36 years. For every 100 females, there were 101.7 males. For every 100 females age 18 and over, there were 99.5 males.

The median household income was $38,750 and the median family income was $47,679. Males had a median income of $36,136 versus $23,125 for females. The per capita income for the village was $16,528. About 5.9% of families and 9.3% of the population were below the poverty line, including 11.6% of those under age 18 and 2.6% of those age 65 or over.
