= Hamburg (village), New York =

Hamburg, New York
- Village
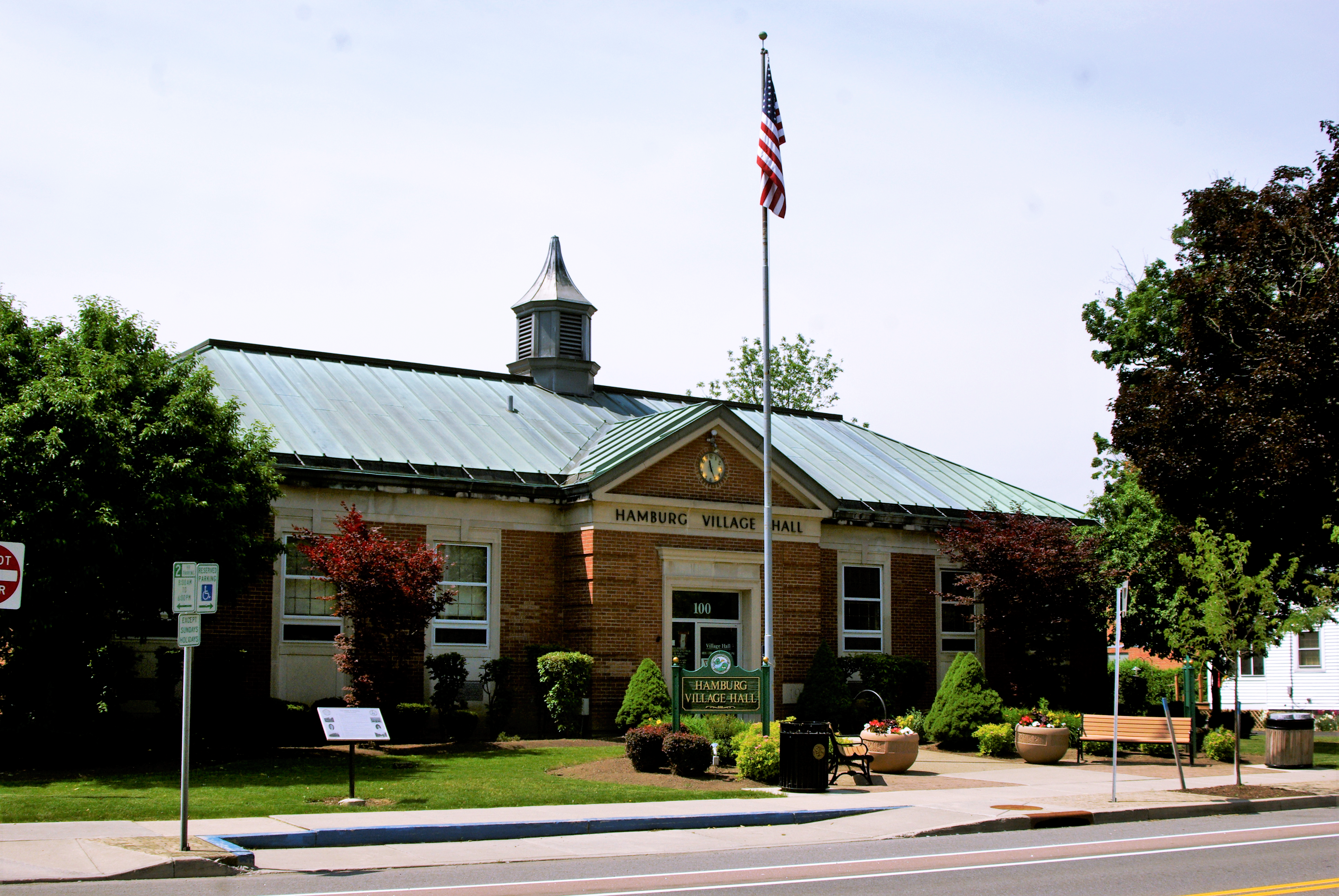
- Hamburg Village Hall

- Seal
- Motto: "Come to Discover. Stay for the Charm."
- Location within Erie County and New York

- Location within the United States
- Coordinates: 42°43′22″N 78°50′2″W
- Country: United States
- State: New York
- County: Erie
- Town: Hamburg
- Named after: Hamburg, Germany

Government
  - Mayor: Thomas P. Tallman

Area
  - Total: 2.48 sq mi (6.42 km^{2})
  - Land: 2.48 sq mi (6.42 km^{2})
  - Water: 0 sq mi (0.00 km^{2})
- Elevation: 820 ft (250 m)

Population (2020)
  - Total: 9,696
  - Density: 3,910.7/sq mi (1,509.94/km^{2})
- Time zone: UTC-5 (Eastern (EST))
  - Summer (DST): UTC-4 (EDT)
- ZIP Code: 14075
- Area code: 716
- FIPS code: 36-31643
- GNIS feature ID: 0952086
- Website: villageofhamburgny.gov

Hamburg is a village in Erie County, New York, United States. The population was 9,696 at the 2020 census. The village is named after Hamburg, the second largest city in Germany. It is part of the Buffalo-Niagara Falls metropolitan area.

The village of Hamburg lies in the southeast part of the town of Hamburg and is south of Buffalo.

== History ==
The Village of Hamburg was incorporated in 1874 and had a population in 1880 of 758.

The Hamburg Downtown Historic District was listed on the National Register of Historic Places in 2012.

== Geography ==
Hamburg is located at 42°43′21″N 78°50′1″W (42.722759, -78.833853).

According to the United States Census Bureau, the village has a total area of 2.5 square miles (6.5 km^{2}), all land.

Hamburg lies at the junction of several major trucking roads, such as Lakeview Road, Boston State Road (Route 391), Sisson Highway (Route 75), South Park Avenue/Buffalo Street (U.S. Route 62), which becomes Gowanda State Road south of the village, and McKinley Parkway. Hamburg is east of the New York State Thruway (Interstate 90).

Eighteen Mile Creek flows south of the village to Lake Erie.

== Demographics ==
Historical population
Census	Pop.	Note	%±
1880	758		—
1890	1,331		75.6%
1900	1,683		26.4%
1910	2,134		26.8%
1920	3,185		49.3%
1930	4,731		48.5%
1940	5,467		15.6%
1950	6,938		26.9%
1960	9,145		31.8%
1970	10,215		11.7%
1980	10,582		3.6%
1990	10,442		−1.3%
2000	10,116		−3.1%
2010	9,409		−7.0%
2020	9,696		3.1%
U.S. Decennial Census

At the 2000 census there were 10,116 people, 4,010 households, and 2,694 families in the village. The population density was 4,025.2 inhabitants per square mile (1,554.1/km^{2}). There were 4,144 housing units at an average density of 1,648.9 per square mile (636.6/km^{2}). The racial makeup of the village was 98.64% White, 0.20% Black or African American, 0.15% Native American, 0.40% Asian, 0.15% from other races, and 0.47% from two or more races. Hispanic or Latino of any race were 0.75%.

Of the 4,010 households 33.5% had children under the age of 18 living with them, 55.4% were married couples living together, 9.1% had a female householder with no husband present, and 32.8% were non-families. 28.7% of households were one person and 15.3% were one person aged 65 or older. The average household size was 2.50 and the average family size was 3.12.

The age distribution was 26.4% under the age of 18, 6.0% from 18 to 24, 27.2% from 25 to 44, 23.9% from 45 to 64, and 16.4% 65 or older. The median age was 38 years. For every 100 females, there were 87.3 males. For every 100 females age 18 and over, there were 81.1 males.

The median household income was $51,239 and the median family income was $63,180. Males had a median income of $43,395 versus $31,731 for females. The per capita income for the village was $23,371. About 2.8% of families and 3.0% of the population were below the poverty line, including 3.0% of those under age 18 and 2.7% of those age 65 or over.

== Notable people ==
- George Bush, racing driver
- Michael Dubke, former White House communications
- Jack Kemp, American politician and professional football player.
- E. Howard Hunt, An American intelligence officer and author. Plotted the Watergate burglaries and other clandestine operations for the Nixon administration.
- Kathy Hochul, Governor of New York
