= Langford, New York =

Hamlet in New York, United States

Coordinates: 42°35′15″N 78°50′31″W

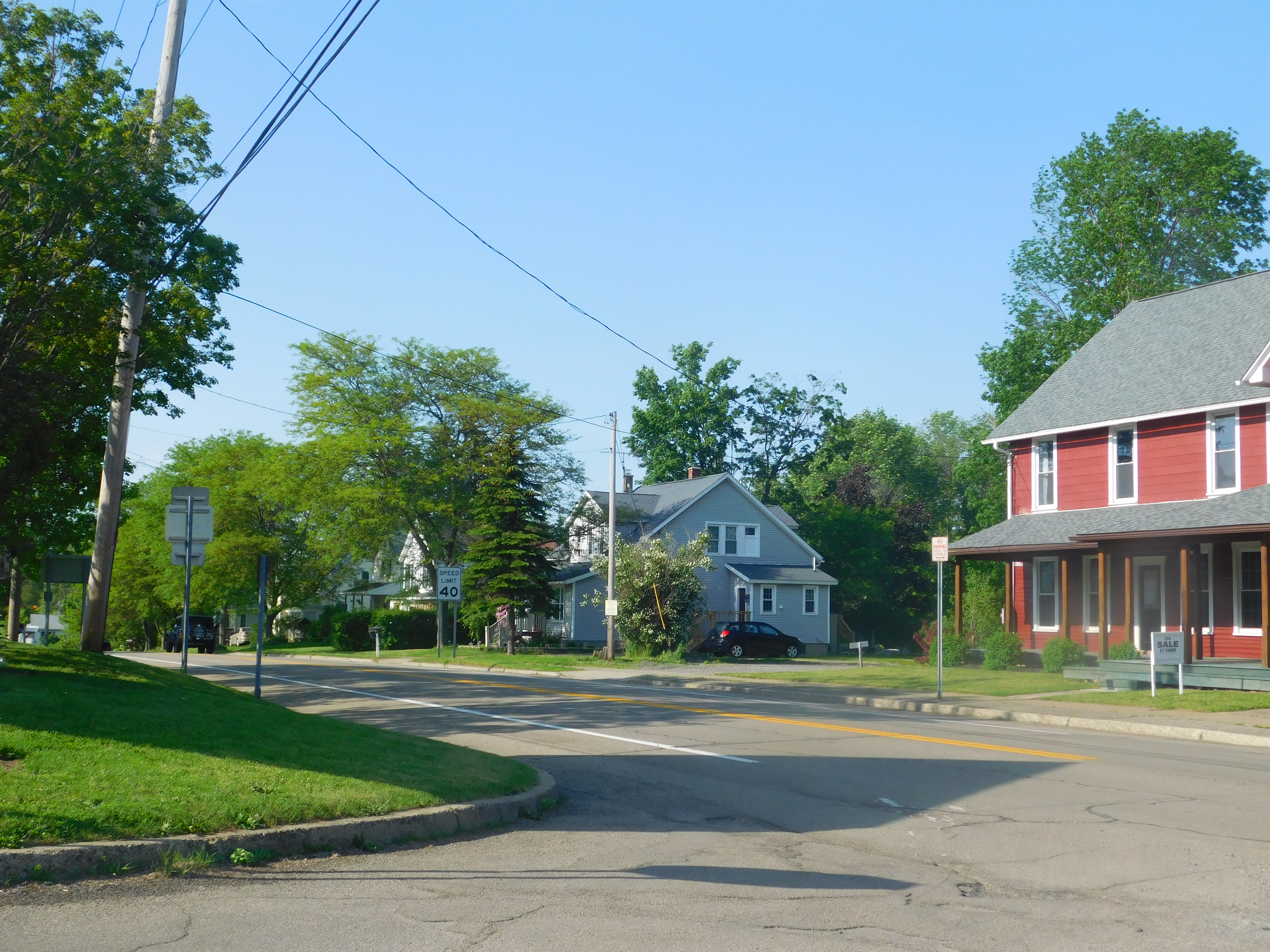
Langford on NY 75

Langford is a hamlet in the town of North Collins in southern Erie County, New York, United States. The hamlet is located at the junction of NY 249 and NY 75.

Langford's primary attraction is its 4,000-seat stadium, which hosts an annual country music concert and tractor pull in the first weekend of each August.
