= Eighteen Mile Creek (Erie County) =

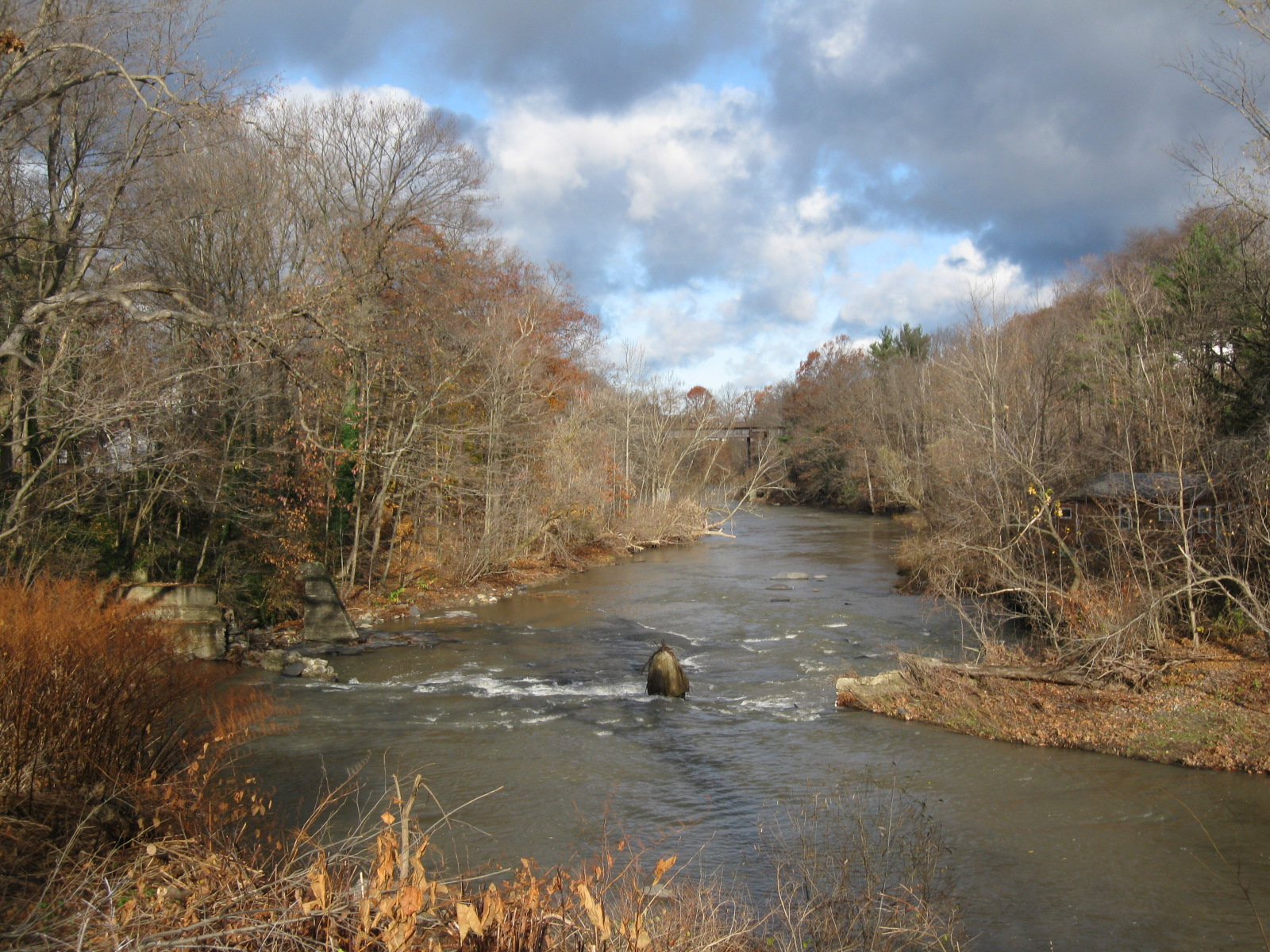
- Eighteen Mile Creek in Hamburg, New York.

- Location of the mouth of Eighteen Mile Creek in New York State. Eighteen Mile Creek (Erie County) (the United States)

Location
- Country: United States
- State: New York
- Region: Western New York
- County: Erie County

Physical characteristics
- Source
  - location: Concord
  - coordinates: 42°33′23″N 78°41′28″W
- 2nd source: South Branch Eighteen Mile Cr.
  - location: North Collins
  - coordinates: 42°32′17″N 78°45′51″W
- Source confluence
  - location: Hamburg
  - coordinates: 42°41′58″N 78°54′12″W
- Mouth: Lake Erie
  - location: Highland-on-the-Lake
  - coordinates: 42°43′05″N 78°58′09″W
- Basin size: 310 km^{2} (120 sq mi)

Basin features
- Tributaries
  - right: South Branch Eighteen Mile Cr.

Eighteen Mile Creek (also known as Eighteenmile Creek) is a tributary of Lake Erie located in southern Erie County, New York, United States. The creek is the second largest tributary of Lake Erie in New York State.

The name is derived from the creek's distance south of the Niagara River in Buffalo. The creek was named Koughquaugu Creek by the Seneca Nation.

== Course ==
From its source in the town of Concord, Eighteen Mile Creek flows north and then west before entering Lake Erie at the community of Highland-on-the-Lake in the town of Evans. It has one major tributary, the South Branch Eighteen Mile Creek, which joins the main branch within Eighteen Mile Creek Park in the town of Hamburg. The creek drains an approximately 120-square-mile (310 km^{2}) watershed.

== Geology ==
The lower section of Eighteen Mile Creek has been known for its abundance of fossils since the 19th century. The faces of the creek's gorges expose bands of shale overlain by limestone which yield numerous fossils dating from the middle to late Devonian Period. These include corals such as Heliophyllum and Favosites in addition to various species of crinoids, brachiopods, bryozoans, bivalves, and trilobites.

Portions of the creek and surrounding area in the town of Hamburg have been designated as a "Critical Environmental Area" due to its abundance of fossils.

== Public use ==
=== Sportfishing ===
Eighteen Mile Creek is utilized by anglers seeking Lake Erie steelhead during their annual spawning runs that take place from mid-October to early May. Brown trout are also sought year-round. Fishing access is facilitated by 1.4 miles (2.3 km) of "public fishing rights" conservation easements secured along the creek and its major tributary, the creek's South Branch. An additional 2.5 miles (4.0 km) of stream access is available within Eighteen Mile Creek County Park; the portion located along the main stem within the park is a catch and release area where only artificial lures are permitted.

Eighteen Mile Creek is stocked annually by the New York State Department of Environmental Conservation. In 2014, 20,000 steelhead and 660 brown trout were stocked in the stream, and an additional 20,000 steelhead were stocked in the creek's South Branch.

=== Parks and forests ===
Eighteen Mile Creek Park, a 464-acre (1.88 km^{2}) county park, is located at the confluence of Eighteen Mile Creek's main stem and its South Branch in the town of Hamburg. The park is largely undeveloped with the exception of hiking trails and a small parking area. It is managed by the Erie County Department of Parks, Recreation and Forestry and includes a 60-foot (18 m) gorge along the creek. A small parking lot on South Creek Road provides access to five miles (8.0 km) of hiking trails, as well as access for fishing along the creek.

In November 2015, the Erie County Parks Department announced that a 225-acre (0.91 km^{2}) forested parcel at the headwaters of Eighteen Mile Creek had been purchased by the county in order to prevent commercial development. The acquisition took place in collaboration with The Nature Conservancy and the Buffalo Niagara Riverkeeper, who together with the county aimed to raise $320,000 for the purchase. The newly purchased forest in the town of Concord joins other county lands protecting the creek's headwaters, helping to provide habitat for fish and wildlife in addition to improving drinking water quality within the region. Over 1,000 acres (4.0 km^{2}; 1.6 sq mi) of land near the creek's headwaters are protected by the county, and are accessible to the public for passive recreation such as hiking.

== See also ==
- List of rivers in New York
