= Farnham, New York =

Farnham, New York Seneca: Tgají’ehdo’
- Village
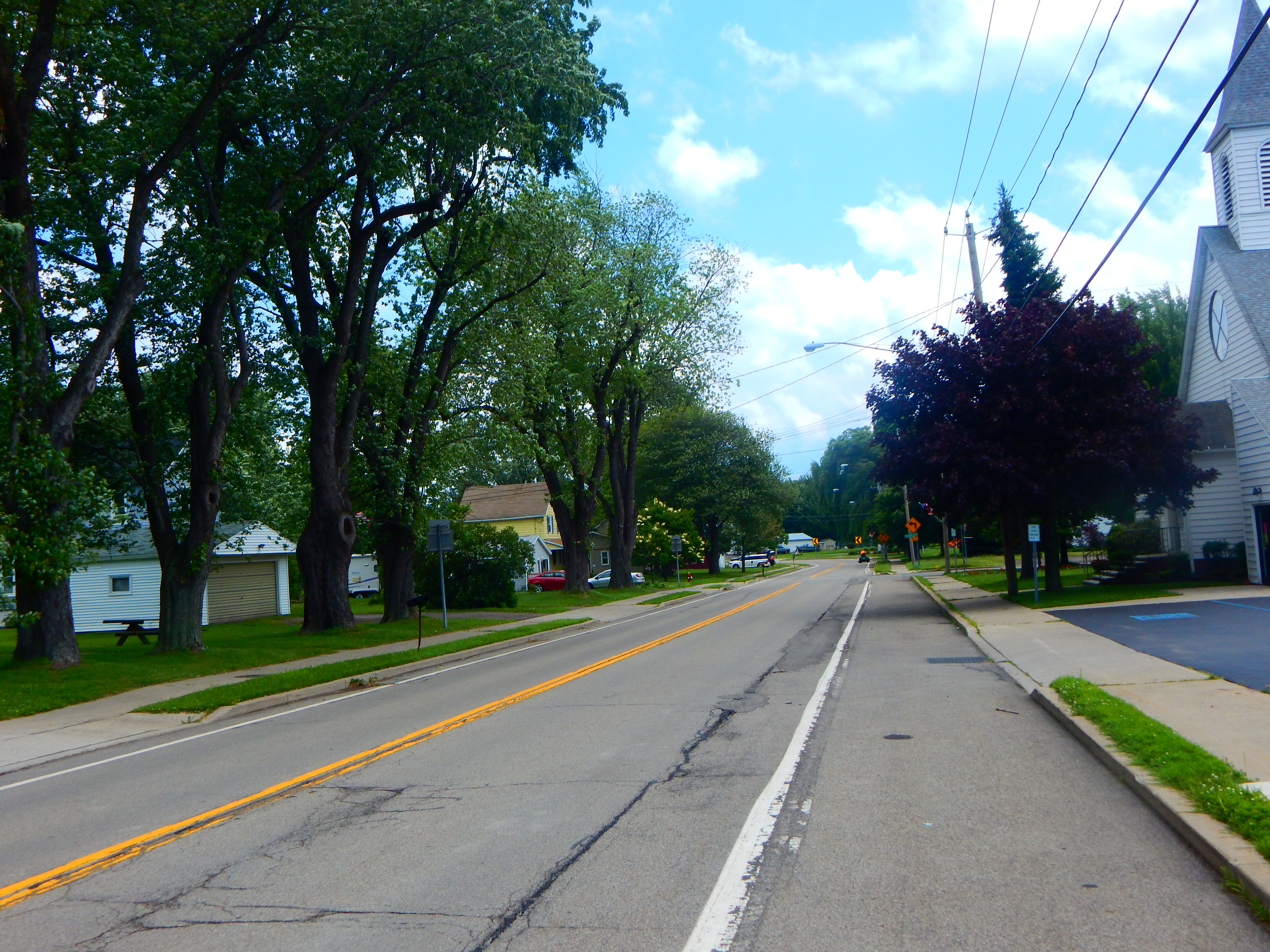
- NY 249 east through the center of Farnham

- Seal

- Location in Erie County and the state of New York
- Coordinates: 42°35′30″N 79°5′7″W
- Country: United States
- State: New York
- County: Erie
- Town: Brant

Area
  - Total: 1.21 sq mi (3.13 km^{2})
  - Land: 1.21 sq mi (3.13 km^{2})
  - Water: 0 sq mi (0.00 km^{2})
- Elevation: 640 ft (195 m)

Population (2020)
  - Total: 381
  - Density: 315.7/sq mi (121.89/km^{2})
- Time zone: UTC-5 (Eastern (EST))
  - Summer (DST): UTC-4 (EDT)
- ZIP Codes: 14061 (Farnham); 14081 (Irving)
- Area code: 716
- FIPS code: 36-25428
- GNIS feature ID: 0949923
- Website: www.villageoffarnham.com

Farnham (Seneca: Tgají’ehdo’) is a village in the town of Brant, New York, United States. The population of Farnham was 381 at the 2020 census. It is part of the Buffalo-Niagara Falls metropolitan area. The village is named after Leroy Farnham, a local landowner and merchant.

Farnham is located in the western part of the town of Brant, north of the Cattaraugus Reservation and southeast of Evangola State Park.

== History ==
The Village of Farnham was incorporated in 1892, having been built up around the Lake Shore Railroad.

== Geography ==
Farnham is located at 42°35′30″N 79°5′7″W (42.591643, -79.085173).

According to the United States Census Bureau, the village has a total area of 1.2 square miles (3.1 km^{2}), all land.

Farnham is at the junction of New York State Route 5 and New York State Route 249.

== Demographics ==
Historical population
| Census | Pop. | Note | %± |
|---|---|---|---|
| 1900 | 262 | | — |
| 1910 | 540 | | 106.1% |
| 1920 | 516 | | −4.4% |
| 1930 | 453 | | −12.2% |
| 1940 | 388 | | −14.3% |
| 1950 | 396 | | 2.1% |
| 1960 | 422 | | 6.6% |
| 1970 | 546 | | 29.4% |
| 1980 | 404 | | −26.0% |
| 1990 | 427 | | 5.7% |
| 2000 | 322 | | −24.6% |
| 2010 | 382 | | 18.6% |
| 2020 | 381 | | −0.3% |
U.S. Decennial Census

At the 2000 census, there were 322 people, 113 households and 87 families living in the village. The population density was 266.7 inhabitants per square mile (103.0/km^{2}). There were 126 housing units at an average density of 104.3 per square mile (40.3/km^{2}). The racial makeup of the village was 95.03% White, 0.93% African American, 1.24% Native American, 0.62% from other races, and 2.17% from two or more races. Hispanic or Latino of any race were 1.24% of the population.

There were 113 households, of which 38.1% had children under the age of 18 living with them, 55.8% were married couples living together, 15.9% had a female householder with no husband present, and 23.0% were non-families. 20.4% of all households were made up of individuals, and 10.6% had someone living alone who was 65 years of age or older. The average household size was 2.84 and the average family size was 3.28.

Age distribution was 28.6% under the age of 18, 9.6% from 18 to 24, 26.1% from 25 to 44, 22.0% from 45 to 64, and 13.7% who were 65 years of age or older. The median age was 36 years. For every 100 females, there were 89.4 males. For every 100 females age 18 and over, there were 90.1 males.

The median household income was $35,000, and the median family income was $37,000. Males had a median income of $31,000 versus $25,208 for females. The per capita income for the village was $14,386. About 7.0% of families and 7.7% of the population were below the poverty line, including 10.2% of those under age 18 and none of those age 65 or over.

== Notable person ==
- Clint Holmes, singer-songwriter and Las Vegas entertainer; lived in Farnham as a child
