= Collins Center, New York =

Hamlet in New York, United States

Coordinates: 42°29′37″N 78°51′05″W

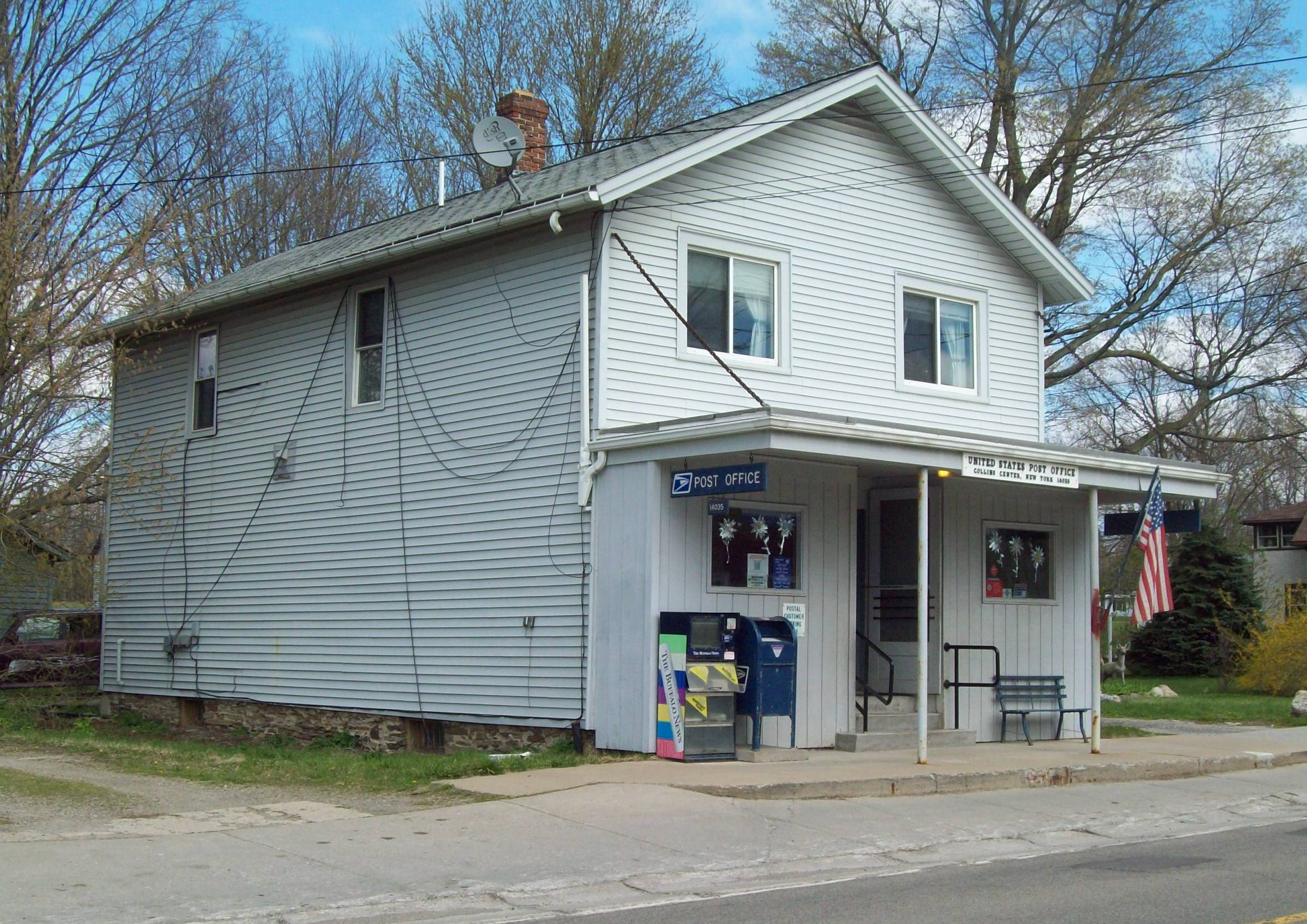
U.S. Post Office, Collins Center, New York, April 2012

Collins Center is a hamlet in the town of Collins in Erie County, New York, United States. The ZIP Code for Collins Center is 14035.
