= List of former state routes in New York (201–300) =

This section of the list of former state routes in New York contains all routes numbered between 201 and 300.

Route	Southern or western terminus	Northern or eastern terminus	Formed	Removed
NY 201 (1930-1950s)	NY 199 in Pine Plains	NY 22 in Copake	1930	early 1950s
NY 202 (1930-1935)	NY 52 in East Fishkill	NY 55 in Poughkeepsie	1930	1935
NY 204 (1930-1940s)	US 20 in Nassau	NY 295 in Chatham	1930	early 1940s
NY 209 (1930-1935)	NY 19 in Shelby	NY 18 in Carlton	1930	1935
NY 215 (1930-1939)	NY 17 near Bloomingburg	US 9W / NY 32 in Newburgh	1930	ca. 1939
NY 215 (1940s-1970s)	NY 360 in Hamlin	Hamlin Beach State Park south boundary in Hamlin	early 1940s	early 1970s
NY 218 (1930-early 1940s)	NY 41 in Coventry	NY 7 in Bainbridge	1930	early 1940s
NY 219 (1930-1935)	NY 26 / NY 79 in Whitney Point	NY 12 / NY 41 in Greene	1930	ca. 1935
NY 225 (1930-late 1940s)	NY 17 in Tioga	NY 223 in Spencer	1930	late 1940s
NY 229	NY 34 in Lansing	NY 38 in Fleming	1930	ca. 1939
NY 231 (1931-1939)	NY 414 in Butler	NY 38 in Conquest	ca. 1931	ca. 1939
NY 232 (1933-1940s)	NY 17G in Rexville	NY 21 in Troupsburg	ca. 1933	1950
NY 234	NY 26 in Vernon	NY 31 / NY 365 in Verona	ca. 1932	1981
NY 236 (1931-1939)	NY 17 in Hancock	NY 10 in Tompkins	ca. 1931	ca. 1939
NY 239	NY 354 in Marilla	US 20 in Alden	1930	1980
NY 252A	NY 33A / NY 386 in Chili	NY 383 in Chili	late 1950s	2009
NY 254 (1930-1940)	US 20A in Geneseo	US 20 / NY 5 in Avon	1930	ca. 1940
NY 255	NY 256 in Sparta	NY 15 in Conesus	1930	1995
NY 257 (1935-1941)	US 9W in Highland Falls	US 9W in Cornwall-on-Hudson	1935	1941
NY 264 (1930-1932)	NY 18 in Cattaraugus	East Otto	1930	ca. 1932
NY 265 (1931-1936)	NY 5 in Clarence	NY 267 in Clarence	ca. 1931	ca. 1936
NY 266 (1931-1935)	NY 78 in Clarence	NY 267 in Clarence	ca. 1931	ca. 1935
NY 267 (1931-1935)	NY 5 in Clarence	NY 263 in Clarence	ca. 1931	ca. 1935
NY 267	NY 93 in Akron	NY 77 in Alabama	ca. 1935	1980
NY 268 (1934-1974)	NY 5 in Clarence	NY 78 on Clarence–Amherst town line	ca. 1934	ca. 1974
NY 273 (1931-early 1940s)	NY 53 in Italy Hill	NY 54A in Branchport	ca. 1931	early 1940s
NY 273	US 4 near Whitehall village	NY 22A in Hampton	1949	1980
NY 274 (1933-1940s)	NY 36 in Troupsburg	NY 17 in Woodhull	ca. 1933	early 1940s
NY 276 (1930s)	NY 305 south of Clarksville	NY 275 in Bolivar	1930	ca. 1939
NY 276 (1940s)	NY 27A in Massapequa Park	NY 27 in Massapequa Park	ca. 1941	late 1940s
NY 278 (1930-1935)	NY 75 in Boston	NY 16 in Holland	1930	ca. 1935
NY 278 (1935-1938)	US 20 in Hamburg	NY 78 in Orchard Park	ca. 1935	ca. 1938
NY 279 (1931-1933)	NY 39 in Sardinia	NY 16 in Sardinia	ca. 1931	ca. 1933
NY 279 (1933-1935)	US 6 in Port Jervis	US 9W in Kingston	1933	1935
NY 283 (1930-1970)	NY 282 in Nichols	NY 17 in Owego	1930	1970
NY 283 (1970s)	US 11 in Antwerp	NY 12 in Alexandria Bay	mid-1970s	by 1981
NY 284 (1930-1939)	NY 52 in Callicoon	NY 17 in Rockland	1930	ca. 1939
NY 285	NY 69 in Annsville	Oneida CR 67A / CR 70 in Florence	1930	1988
NY 286 (1930-early 1940s)	NY 22 in Granville	VT 30A at the Vermont state line at Hampton	1930	early 1940s
NY 286A (1938-1939)	NY 286 in Hampton	VT 286A at the Vermont state line at Hampton	ca. 1938	ca. 1939
NY 286A	NY 47 in Penfield	NY 286 in Penfield	1949	early 1970s
NY 287 (1930-1970)	NY 12 / NY 12C / NY 28 in Barneveld	NY 8 in Ohio	1930	1970
NY 287 (1970s)	NY 283 in Alexandria	NY 37 in Alexandria	mid-1970s	1979
NY 288 (1930-1940)	US 11 in Sandy Creek	Boylston	1930	ca. 1940
NY 288	NY 161 in Glen	NY 5S in Glen	early 1940s	1981
NY 291 (1930-1940s)	NY 2 / NY 14 in Phelps	NY 89 in Tyre	1930	early 1940s
NY 292 (1935-1938)	NY 54A in Jerusalem	Bluff Point	ca. 1935	ca. 1938
NY 293 (1930-1933)	NY 31 in Weedsport	NY 5 in Elbridge	1930	ca. 1933
NY 297 (1931-ca. 1936)	NY 23 in South Gilboa	NY 30 in Gilboa	1931	ca. 1936
NY 298 (1930-1934)	NY 9G in Germantown	US 9 in Clermont	1930	ca. 1934
