= Interstate 990 =

Highway in New York, United States

Interstate 990
- Staff Sergeant William R. Wilson III Memorial Highway; Lockport Expressway
- I-990 highlighted in red

Route information
- Auxiliary route of I-90
- Maintained by NYSDOT
- Length: 6.53 mi (10.51 km)
- Existed: January 1979–present
- History: First section opened in 1980s
- NHS: Entire route

Major junctions
- South end: I-290 in Amherst
- North end: NY 263 in Amherst

Location
- Country: United States
- State: New York
- Counties: Erie

Highway system
- Interstate Highway System; Main; Auxiliary; Suffixed; Business; Future; New York Highways; Interstate; US; State; Reference; Parkways
| ← NY 962J | → NY 990L |

Interstate 990 (I-990) is an auxiliary Interstate Highway located entirely within the town of Amherst in Erie County, New York, in the United States. It runs in a roughly north–south direction for 6.35 miles (10.22 km) through the southwestern and central parts of Amherst from an interchange with I-290 north of Buffalo to an intersection with New York Route 263 (NY 263, named Millersport Highway) south of Lockport. The highway serves as a connection between Buffalo, the University at Buffalo, and Lockport (via NY 263 and NY 78). Like I-590 in nearby Rochester, I-990 does not physically meet I-90, its parent Interstate Highway; instead, the highway makes the connection by way of a "sibling" highway (I-290). As Interstates 91–99 do not have any 99x-numbered spurs, I-990 is the highest numbered Interstate Highway in the US.

Plans for an expressway between Buffalo and Lockport were proposed as early as the late 1960s. As originally laid out, the highway would run for 12 miles (19 km) and end in Lockport's eastern suburbs. By the time the road was added to the Interstate Highway System and designated I-990 in 1979, the proposal had been scaled back to a four-mile (6.4 km) freeway linking I-290 to North French Road. The route was constructed and opened to traffic in two stages during the 1980s. An extension to NY 263 was finished in 1990 and officially added to I-990 three years later.

== Description ==
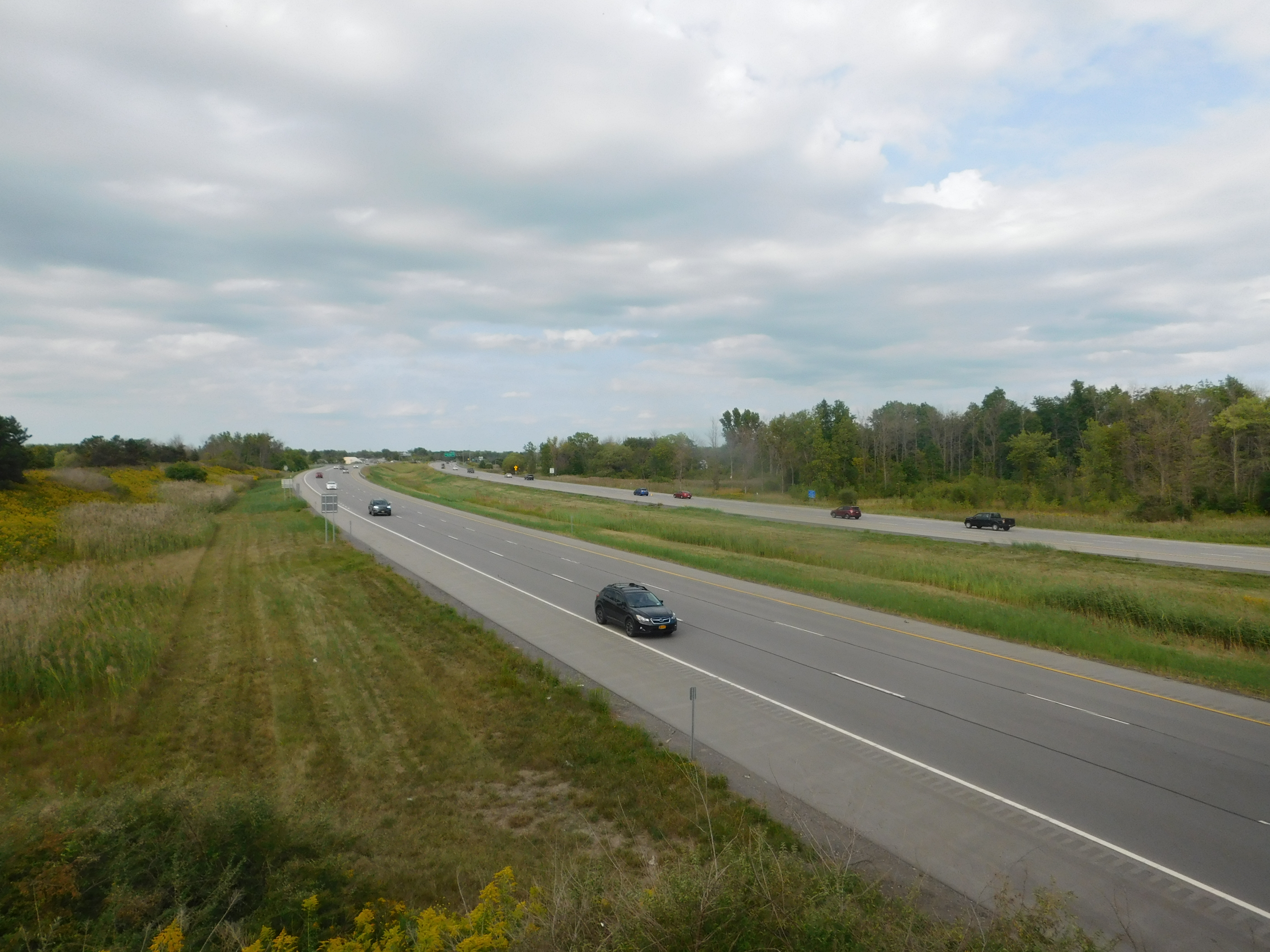
I-990 northbound from the Amherst pedestrian bridge

I-990 begins at a semi-directional T interchange (exit 4) with I-290 (Youngmann Expressway) in the Buffalo suburb of Amherst. After leaving the interchange, I-990, known as the Lockport Expressway, proceeds northward along the western edge of the University at Buffalo's Amherst Campus as a four-lane divided expressway. It generally parallels Sweet Home Road (unsigned NY 952T) to exit 1, a northbound-only interchange providing access to Audubon Parkway by way of a two-lane connector to the campus. From here, I-990 gradually bends northeastward, leaving the vicinity of the campus and entering a partial cloverleaf interchange (exit 2) connecting to Sweet Home Road.

The Interstate Highway continues to turn to the northeast as it heads away from exit 2, crossing over Ellicott Creek and Dodge Road (County Route 45). I-990 expands to six lanes just as it enters the nearby exit 3, which connects to Dodge Road and the northern end of the Audubon Parkway. The freeway briefly runs eastward from the junction, paralleling Dodge Road into the hamlet of Getzville, where the expressway passes over NY 270 (Campbell Boulevard). Just after the NY 270 crossing, I-990 bends northward once again and enters exit 4, a diamond interchange with North French Road (CR 299).

Past North French Road, I-990 bends back to the northeast, crossing Hopkins Road (CR 87) as it approaches an at-grade intersection with NY 263 (Millersport Highway). The junction serves as I-990's exit 5 and its northern terminus. Traffic approaching the junction on northbound I-990 is diverted onto what was intended to be a single-lane exit ramp leading to NY 263. A small stub of highway exists east of the exit gore.

== History ==
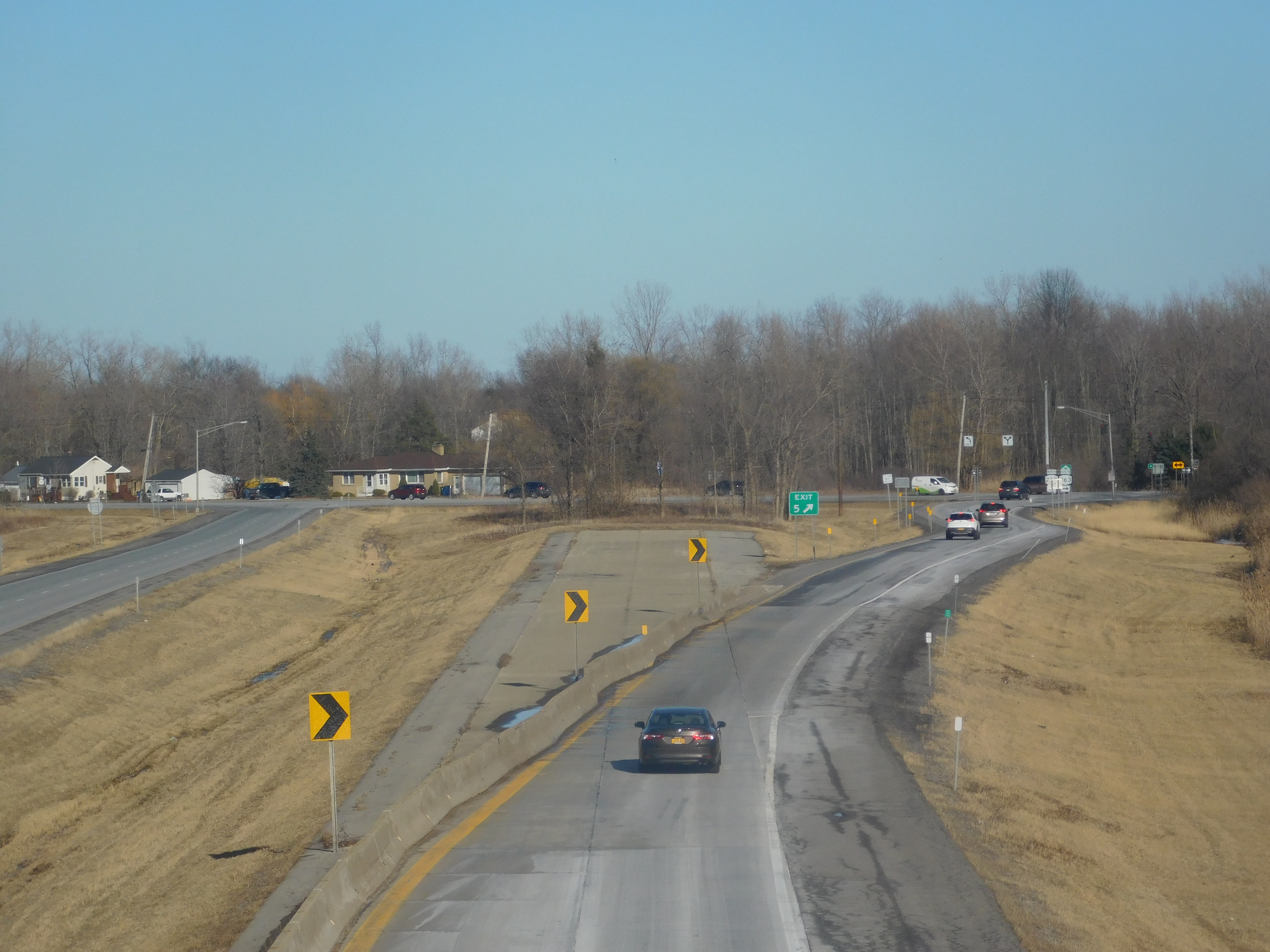
I-990's northern terminus, featuring the incomplete stub at NY 263, seen from the Hopkins Road overpass

On October 30, 1968, the New York State Department of Transportation (NYSDOT) nominated 20 proposed highways to be added to the Interstate Highway System as part of a 1,500-mile (2,400 km) nationwide system expansion authorized by the Federal-Aid Highway Act of 1968. One of the submitted roads was the Lockport Expressway, a 12-mile (19 km), $22-million limited-access highway extending in a northeast–southwest direction between I-290 north of Buffalo and a proposed Niagara Falls–Rochester freeway near Lockport. When the city of Niagara Falls released its Regional Highway Plan for the Buffalo–Niagara Falls area in 1971, the Niagara Falls–Rochester highway was scrapped; as a result, the north end of the Lockport Expressway was moved to a point on NY 31 east of Lockport. In between I-290 and NY 31, the highway would intersect the proposed Belt Expressway and NY 78 (Transit Road).

While the outer belt proposal was mostly dropped, the plans to build the Lockport Expressway gained traction in January 1979 when the 4.2-mile (6.8 km) portion between I-290 and North French Road was added to the Interstate Highway System and designated as I-990. The remainder of the original 12-mile (19 km) route was excluded due to a lack of funding. Construction began in 1980 on the part south of Sweet Home Road, and the highway was opened to traffic by 1985. The section leading northeast to North French Road was built during the mid-1980s and completed by 1990. In 1986, NYSDOT began to evaluate ways to improve the highways surrounding the northern terminus of I-990. One of the potential options was an extension of the freeway to NY 263 (Millersport Highway) southwest of Lockport. This option was ultimately selected, and the new section of the freeway was opened to traffic on December 21, 1990. It was officially added to I-990 on October 22, 1993.

In June 2013, I-990 was renamed from the Lockport Expressway to the Staff Sergeant William R. Wilson III Memorial Highway. This is in honor of his contributions to the US military, which included training Afghan soldiers and police to take over the country's security. Staff Sergeant Wilson also served two combat deployments to Iraq as part of Operation Iraqi Freedom. As a result, he was posthumously awarded the Bronze Star Medal and Purple Heart. He also received the National Defense Service Medal, Iraq Campaign Medal, and the Afghanistan Campaign Medal, as well as the Army Service Ribbon and Overseas Service Ribbon. The bill to rename I-990 was sponsored by State Senator Michael Ranzenhofer and Assemblyman Raymond Walter. Signage is now displayed at each terminus showing the new name.

== Exit list ==
The entire route is in Amherst, Erie County.

| mi | km | Exit | Destinations | Notes |
|---|---|---|---|---|
| 0.00 | 0.00 | – | I-290 – Buffalo | Southern terminus; exit 4 on I-290 |
| 1.34 | 2.16 | 1 | Audubon Parkway – University at Buffalo North Campus | Northbound exit and southbound entrance |
| 2.02 | 3.25 | 2 | Sweet Home Road (NY 952T) | Signed as exits 2A (south) and 2B (north) southbound |
| 3.07 | 4.94 | 3 | Audubon Parkway – University at Buffalo North Campus | |
| 4.62 | 7.44 | 4 | North French Road (CR 299) | |
| 6.43 | 10.35 | 5 | NY 263 (Millersport Highway) | Northern terminus; at-grade intersection; northbound exit and southbound entrance |
1.000 mi = 1.609 km; 1.000 km = 0.621 mi: Incomplete access
