= New York State Route 278 (disambiguation) =

New York State Route 278 is an east–west state highway in Rensselaer County, New York, United States, that was established ca. 1938.

New York State Route 278 may also refer to:

- New York State Route 278 (1930–1935) from NY 75 in Boston to NY 16 in Holland in Erie County, see List of former state routes in New York (201–300)
- New York State Route 278 (1935–1938) in northern Erie County
