= Interstate 290 (New York) =

Highway in New York, United States

Interstate 290
- Youngmann Memorial Highway
- I-290 highlighted in red

Route information
- Auxiliary route of I-90
- Maintained by NYSDOT
- Length: 9.8 mi (15.8 km)
- Existed: 1958–present
- History: Completed mid-1960s
- NHS: Entire route

Major junctions
- West end: I-190 in Tonawanda
- NY 384 / CR 119 in Tonawanda; US 62 near Amherst; I-990 in Amherst; NY 263 in Amherst; NY 5 near Williamsville
- East end: I-90 / New York Thruway / NY 5 in Williamsville

Location
- Country: United States
- State: New York
- Counties: Erie

Highway system
- Interstate Highway System; Main; Auxiliary; Suffixed; Business; Future; New York Highways; Interstate; US; State; Reference; Parkways
← NY 289	→ NY 290

Interstate 290 (I-290) is a 9.8-mile-long (15.8 km) auxiliary Interstate Highway in the Buffalo–Niagara Falls metropolitan area. It connects I-190 in Tonawanda with I-90 in Williamsville, via Amherst. It provides a route to Niagara Falls and Canada from the east that bypasses the city of Buffalo. I-290 also connects to I-990 and, through this connection, provides access to the Amherst campus of the University at Buffalo. Its official name is the Youngmann Memorial Highway, but, locally, it is colloquially referred to as "the 290" and "the Youngmann". The highway provides the fastest road link between Toronto (Canada's largest city) and the heavily populated Northeastern US via I-90.

== Route description ==
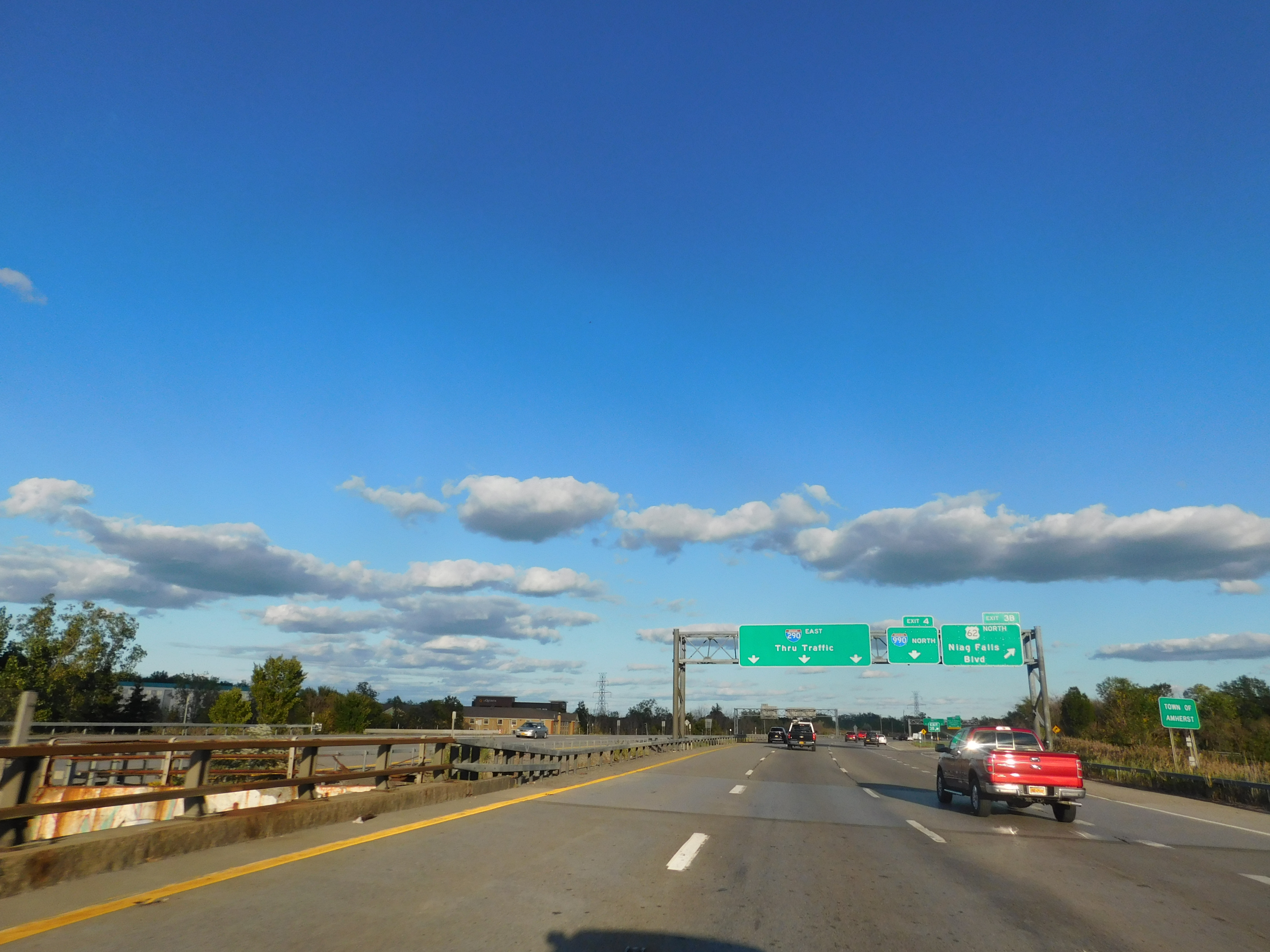
I-290 eastbound approaching exit 3B in Amherst

I-290 begins at a semi-directional T interchange with I-190 within view of the Niagara River in an industrial sector of the Buffalo suburb of Tonawanda. The freeway heads east from I-190 into more residential areas of Tonawanda, where it meets New York State Route 384 (NY 384) at a three-quarter cloverleaf interchange. The two missing portions of the cloverleaf, both ramps leading to NY 384 from I-290 eastbound, are replaced by an exit to Elmwood Avenue located slightly west of the NY 384 exit. To the east of NY 384 (and adjacent to the southeasternmost point in the city of Tonawanda), I-290 interchanges with the Twin Cities Memorial Highway (NY 425).

The Youngmann continues east through Tonawanda to the Amherst town line, where it meets US Route 62 (US 62) at a second three-quarter cloverleaf interchange. Unlike the interchange with NY 384, all connections are possible between I-290 and US 62 due to a modified ramp linking I-290 westbound to US 62. Past US 62 in Amherst, I-290 turns to the southeast ahead of a semi-directional T interchange with I-990, a spur to Lockport. Farther east, I-290 meets NY 263 (Millersport Highway) at a cloverleaf interchange and NY 324 and NY 240 at a modified diamond interchange south of the University at Buffalo's north campus in Amherst.

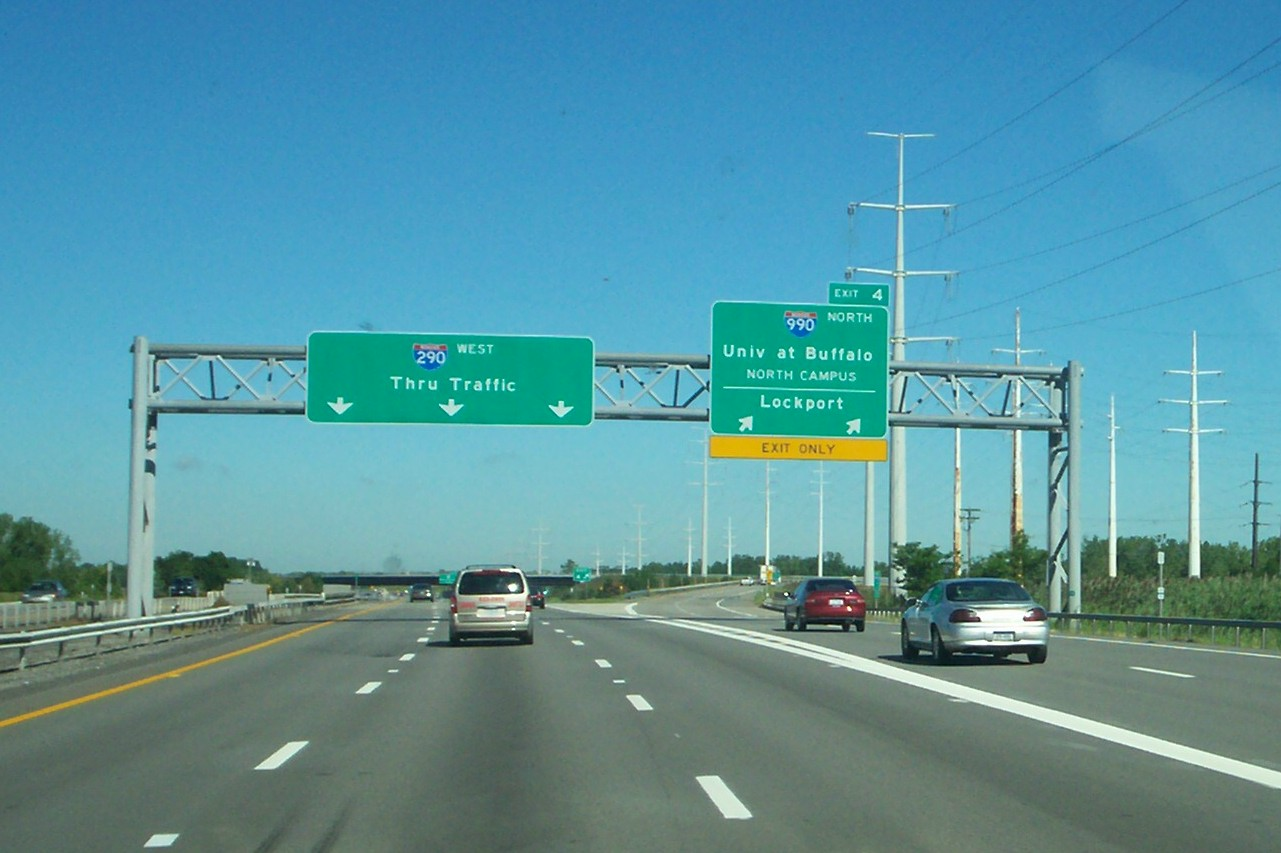
I-290 westbound near I-990

Near Williamsville, I-290 turns southward and intersects NY 5 (Main Street) at a modified cloverleaf interchange. I-290 terminates at a semi-directional T interchange with the New York State Thruway (I-90) a half-mile (0.80 km) to the south on the Amherst–Cheektowaga town line. This interchange is colloquially referenced as "The Blue Water Tower" due to its proximity to a large blue water tower on the Amherst–Cheektowaga town line.

== History ==
What is now I-290 was originally intended to be designated I-190. The route was renumbered I-290 in 1958 to better reflect the future highway's routing as a connector between two Interstate Highways (or a bypass of Buffalo) rather than a spur. Construction on the expressway began c. 1962 when work commenced on the section between NY 263 and the New York State Thruway. This section was finished by the following year, by which time work had begun on the remainder of the freeway. The section between NY 263 and US 62 was opened to traffic c. 1964 while the rest was finished in the mid-1960s. The interchange with what is now I-990 was built in 1983.

The expressway was originally named the Power Line Expressway for the high tension power lines that parallel the expressway. It was renamed in the early 1960s to serve as a memorial to Elmer G. H. Youngmann, a project engineer who died while the road was being built. The official name of the freeway became the Youngmann Memorial Highway; however, the name Youngmann Expressway has also been frequently used over the years.

== Exit list ==
The entire route is in Erie County.

Location	mi	km	Exit	Destinations	Notes
Town of Tonawanda	0.00	0.00	–	I-190 – Buffalo, Niagara Falls	Western terminus; exit 16 on I-190
Town of Tonawanda	2.58	4.15	1	NY 384 (Delaware Avenue) / Elmwood Avenue (CR 119 south)	Signed for NY 384 westbound, Elmwood eastbound; signed as exits 1A (south) and 1B (north) westbound
Town of Tonawanda	3.65	5.87	2	NY 425 north (Colvin Boulevard)	Southern terminus of NY 425
Tonawanda–Amherst town line	5.24	8.43	3	US 62 (Niagara Falls Boulevard)	Signed as exits 3A (south) and 3B (north) eastbound
Amherst	6.19	9.96	4	I-990 north – University at Buffalo, Lockport	Southern terminus of I-990
Amherst	7.31	11.76	5	NY 263 (Millersport Highway)	Signed as exits 5A (south) and 5B (north)
Amherst	8.06	12.97	6	NY 240 (Harlem Road) / NY 324 (Sheridan Drive)	
Amherst	9.75	15.69	7	NY 5 (Main Street)	Signed as exits 7A (west) and 7B (east)
Amherst	10.24	16.48	–	I-90 / New York Thruway – Albany, Erie	Eastern terminus; exit 50 on I-90 / Thruway
1.000 mi = 1.609 km; 1.000 km = 0.621 mi: Electronic toll collection; Incomplete access

== See also ==
- New York State Route 400
- New York State Route 33
- New York State Route 5
- New York State Route 198
