= New York State Route 323 =

Former highway in New York

New York State Route 323
- Map of southern Erie County with NY 323 highlighted in red

Route information
- Maintained by NYSDOT
- Length: 5.24 mi (8.43 km)
- Existed: 1930–August 14, 1980

Major junctions
- South end: NY 249 in Brant
- North end: NY 5 in Evans

Location
- Country: United States
- State: New York
- Counties: Erie

Highway system
- New York Highways; Interstate; US; State; Reference; Parkways
← NY 322	→ NY 324

New York State Route 323 (NY 323) was a state highway in Erie County, New York, in the United States. The route was 5.24 miles (8.43 km) long and stretched from the town of Brant to the hamlet of Evans Center within the town of Evans. NY 323 began at an intersection with NY 249 and County Route 9 (CR 9) in Brant and headed north to a junction with NY 5 in Evans Center. In between, it passed over the New York State Thruway (Interstate 90 or I-90) and intersected U.S. Route 20 (US 20).

The route was assigned as part of the 1930 renumbering of state highways in New York. It went unchanged until 1980 when ownership and maintenance of the route was transferred from the state of New York to Erie County as part of a highway maintenance swap between the two levels of government. The designation was officially removed on August 14, 1980. The former routing of NY 323 is now the northern half of CR 9.

== Route description ==
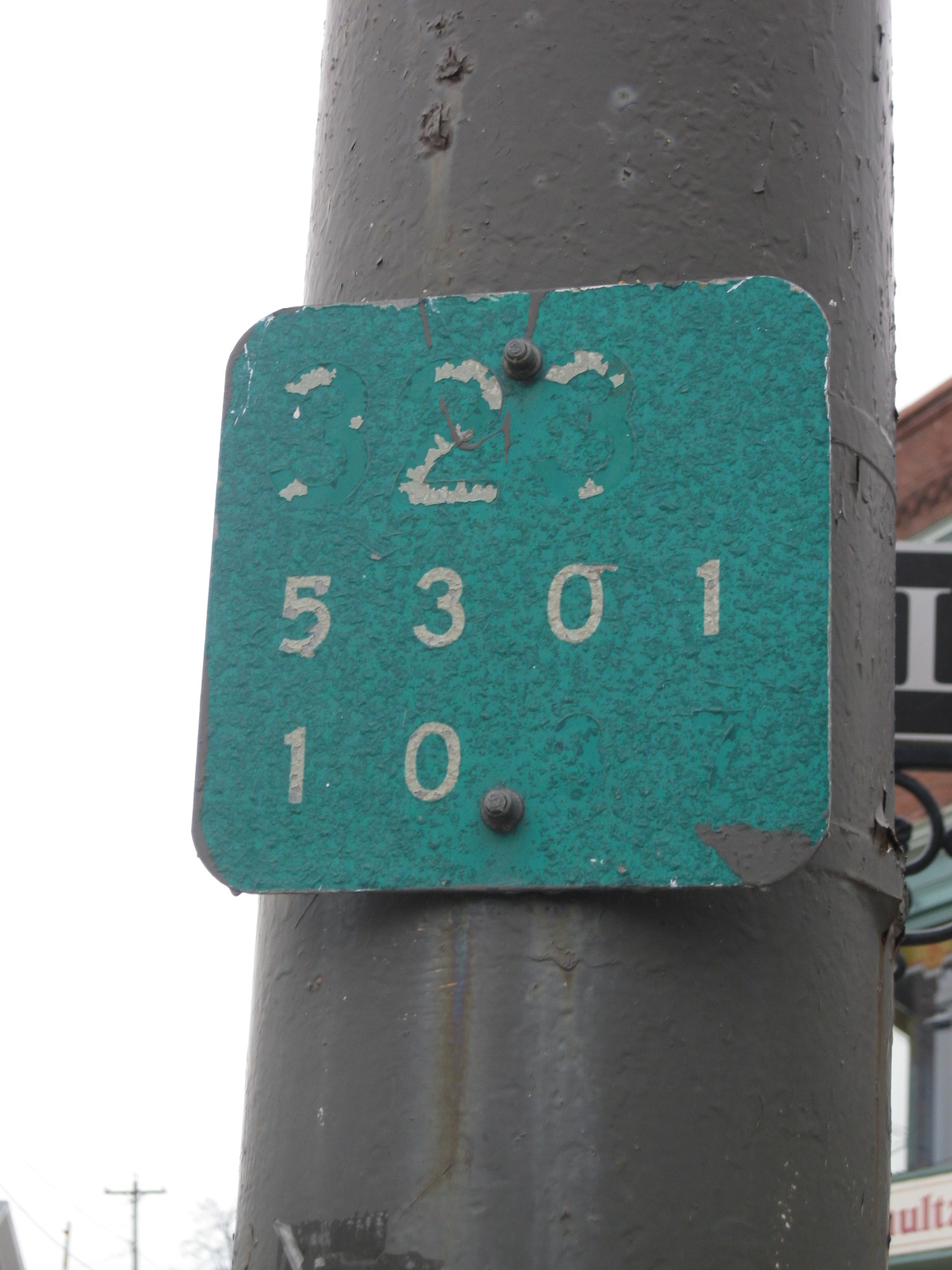
A reference marker depicting former NY 323 at Lake Street in Angola

NY 323 began at an intersection with NY 249 and CR 9 north of the Cattaraugus Indian Reservation in Brant. The route headed northward as Brant–Angola Road through a rural area dominated by open fields and forests. It proceeded to the Brant–Evans town line, where it met Cain Road (CR 491) a short distance south of the New York State Thruway (I-90). The highway progressed onward, passing over the Thruway on its way to a junction with Dunfee Road, a connector leading to US 20. NY 323 met US 20 itself a short distance to the northwest.

The route headed northwest from US 20, intersecting with Pontiac Road (CR 490) as it curved back to the north and entered the village of Angola. Within Angola, NY 323 followed Main Street northward past several blocks of homes and business. At Orchard Avenue, the street turned to the northwest, roughly paralleling Big Sister Creek as both exited the village limits. Past this point, the amount of development along the route dropped slightly as it continued northward toward the hamlet of Evans Center. NY 323 crossed over Big Sister Creek south of the community before ending at a junction with NY 5 in the center of the hamlet.

== History ==
NY 323 was assigned as part of the 1930 renumbering of state highways in New York and served as a connector between NY 249 in Brant and US 20 (now NY 5) in Evans. On April 1, 1980, ownership and maintenance of NY 323 was transferred from the state of New York to Erie County as part of a highway maintenance swap between the two levels of government. The NY 323 designation was officially removed on August 14, 1980. The former routing of NY 323 became an extension of CR 9, which had ended at the junction of NY 249 and NY 323 prior to the swap.

== Major intersections ==
The entire route was in Erie County.

Location	mi	km	Destinations	Notes
Brant	0.00	0.00	NY 249 / CR 9	
Evans	2.25	3.62	US 20 (Southwestern Boulevard)	
Evans	5.24	8.43	NY 5	Hamlet of Evans Center
1.000 mi = 1.609 km; 1.000 km = 0.621 mi

== See also ==
- List of county routes in Erie County, New York (1–32)
