= New York State Route 268 (1934–1974) =

Former highway in New York

New York State Route 268
- Map of the Buffalo area with NY 268 highlighted in red

Route information
- Maintained by NYSDOT
- Length: 12.62 mi (20.31 km)
- Existed: c. 1934–c. 1974

Major junctions
- South end: NY 5 in Clarence
- North end: NY 78 on Clarence–Amherst town line

Location
- Country: United States
- State: New York
- Counties: Erie

Highway system
- New York Highways; Interstate; US; State; Reference; Parkways
← NY 267	→ NY 268

New York State Route 268 (NY 268) was a state highway in northeastern Erie County, New York, in the United States. It served as a connector between NY 5 in the town of Clarence and NY 78 at the Clarence–Amherst town line. The route passed through rural areas of the town of Clarence and did not serve any areas of significant development. The northern portion of NY 268 followed the southern bank of Tonawanda Creek.

The route was assigned c. 1934 as a connector between NY 78 and Tonawanda Creek Road, then part of NY 263. In between the two routes, NY 268 followed Wolcott and Goodrich Roads. NY 268 was moved onto Tonawanda Creek and Salt Roads c. 1938 and remained on those two roads until it was replaced by a reextended NY 263 c. 1974. NY 263 was truncated back to its current northern terminus within three years time, and ownership and maintenance of all of NY 268's former routing was transferred to Erie County by April 1980. Tonawanda Creek Road became County Route 559 (CR 559) while Salt Road was redesignated as County Route 560.

== Route description ==
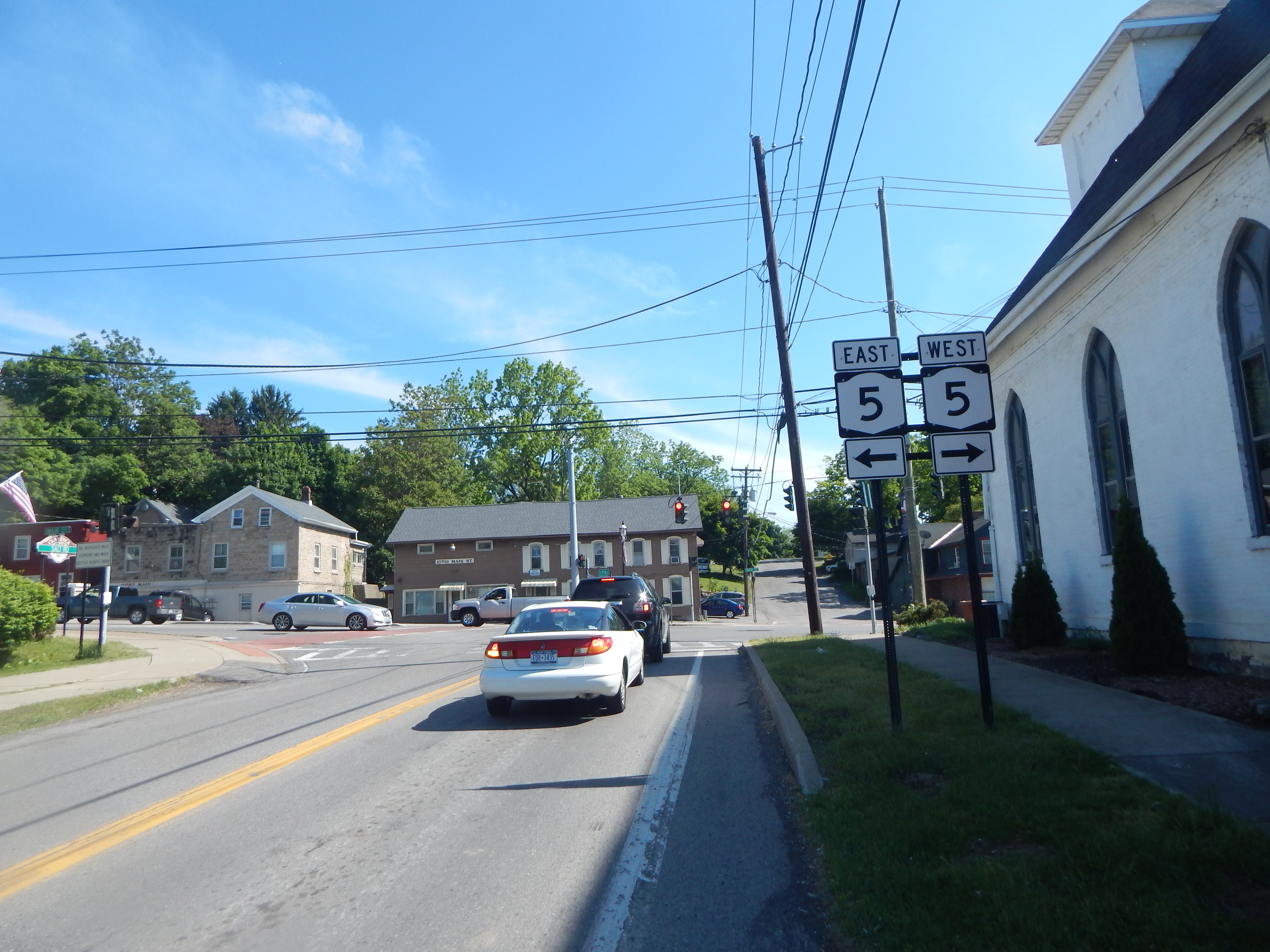
CR 560 at NY 5, the former southern terminus of NY 268

NY 268 began at an intersection with NY 5 in the hamlet of Clarence in the town of the same name. It headed north, following Salt Road out of the hamlet and into a mostly rural area of northeastern Erie County. Here, the route intersected with several east–west highways of local importance and passed by Beeman Creek Park before meeting Tonawanda Creek Road at a junction on the southern bank of Tonawanda Creek. The highway turned west at this junction, following Tonawanda Creek Road along the edge of the creek to the Clarence–Amherst town line, where NY 268 ended at a junction with NY 78 in the hamlet of Millersport.

== History ==
The origins of NY 268 date as far back as 1926, by which time the state of New York had assumed maintenance of several highways in the town of Clarence. The farthest north of these was Tonawanda Creek Road, which was state-maintained from Transit Road (NY 78) in Millersport to Salt Road. From here, state maintenance continued south on Salt Road to a junction with Main Street (what is now NY 5). Also state-maintained by this time was Goodrich Road, a north–south road connecting Tonawanda Creek Road to Main Street (modern NY 5), and Wolcott Road, an east–west highway linking Goodrich Road to Transit Road (what is now NY 78).

NY 263 was assigned c. 1931 to an alignment extending from Getzville to Akron via Millersport. Even though Tonawanda Creek Road was state-maintained from NY 78 to Goodrich Road, NY 263 initially followed a more circuitous route via Wolcottsburg on NY 78, Wolcott Road, and Goodrich Road. East of Goodrich Road, the route proceeded generally southeastward along Tonawanda Creek and Salt Roads to a junction with Hunts Corners–Akron Road 3.5 miles (5.6 km) north of NY 5. At this point, NY 263 turned east to follow Hunts Corners–Akron Road toward Akron. The remainder of Salt Road between NY 263 and NY 5 was designated as NY 267.

NY 263 was gradually realigned to use all of Tonawanda Creek and Salt Roads between NY 5 and NY 78. The first change came c. 1934 when it was realigned to head due east from Millersport on Tonawanda Creek Road. The former routing of NY 263 on Wolcott and Goodrich Roads by way of Wolcottsburg was redesignated as NY 268. By the following year, NY 263 was realigned south of Hunts Corners–Akron Road to use Salt Road, supplanting NY 267. NY 263 was realigned c. 1938 to follow NY 78 north from Middleport instead while NY 268 was shifted onto NY 263's former routing along Tonawanda Creek and Salt Roads.

The routing of NY 268 remained unchanged until c. 1974, when NY 268 was supplanted by a reextended NY 263. The extension was short-lived, however, as NY 263 was pulled back to its junction with NY 78 by 1977. Ownership and maintenance of NY 268's former routing north of Greiner Road was transferred from the state of New York to Erie County at some point prior to 1980. The remainder was given to Erie County on April 1, 1980, as part of a highway maintenance swap between the two levels of government. The Tonawanda Creek Road portion of old NY 268 was redesignated as CR 559 while the Salt Road portion was redesignated as CR 560.

== Major intersections ==
The entire route was in Erie County.

Location	mi	km	Destinations	Notes
Clarence	0.00	0.00	NY 5	
Clarence–Amherst town line	12.62	20.31	NY 78 (Transit Road)	
1.000 mi = 1.609 km; 1.000 km = 0.621 mi

== See also ==
- List of county routes in Erie County, New York (545–580)
