= New York State Route 952Q =

State highway in New York State

New York State Route 952Q
- Walden Avenue
- Map of western New York with NY 952Q highlighted in red

Route information
- Maintained by NYSDOT
- Length: 14.08 mi (22.66 km)
- Existed: April 1, 1980–present

Major junctions
- West end: Buffalo city line
- I-90 / New York Thruway in Cheektowaga
- East end: NY 33 in Alden

Location
- Country: United States
- State: New York
- Counties: Erie

Highway system
- New York Highways; Interstate; US; State; Reference; Parkways

New York State Route 952Q (NY 952Q) is an unsigned reference route designation for the portion of Walden Avenue outside of the Buffalo city limits in Erie County, New York, in the United States. The western terminus of the 14-mile (23 km) route is at the Buffalo city line in Cheektowaga, where Walden Avenue continues west toward downtown Buffalo. Its eastern terminus is at Genesee Street in Alden, where NY 33 and Genesee Street continue on the linear northeasterly path followed by Walden Avenue for most of its routing.

Walden Avenue is the home of the Walden Galleria, a large shopping mall near the street's interchange with the New York State Thruway (Interstate 90 or I-90) in Cheektowaga. As the road heads east through the towns of Cheektowaga, Lancaster, and Alden, it closely parallels the CSX Transportation-owned Rochester Subdivision rail line. NY 952Q, the longest non-parkway reference route in New York, was assigned in 1980 as part of a highway maintenance swap between the state of New York and Erie County.

== Route description ==
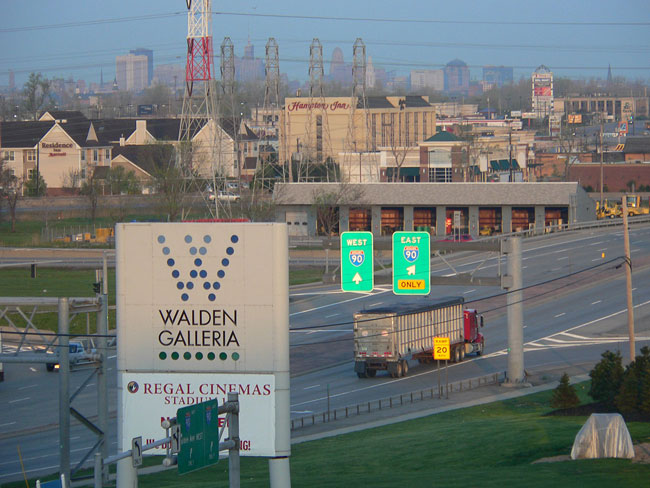
Westward view of Walden Avenue at I-90 (exit 52) in Cheektowaga

NY 952Q begins at the Buffalo city line, picking up Walden Avenue's urban, residential setting. The street heads east through the town of Cheektowaga to an intersection with Harlem Road (NY 240), where Walden Avenue widens from two to four lanes and takes on a suburban commercial setting. Here, the homes that had lined the street are replaced with shopping centers and stores. It continues generally eastward past smaller commercial establishments to New York State Thruway (I-90) exit 52, where the highway widens to six lanes in advance of the sprawling Walden Galleria shopping mall, located adjacent to the northeastern corner of the interchange. Walden Avenue remains a six-lane road for a considerable distance past the mall, meeting Union Road (NY 277) and Dick Road while serving a continuous line of businesses.

The commercial strip ends 2.5 miles (4.0 km) east of the Thruway in the Depew village limits, at which point the road narrows to four lanes as it passes under a branch line leading from the nearby main line of the CSX Transportation. Walden Avenue comes close to the main line tracks here, but it gradually moves away from the railroad as it enters a commercial and residential area of Cheektowaga. Here, the road makes a slight turn to the northeast, beginning a linear 10-mile (16 km) stretch that ultimately takes Walden Avenue out of the Buffalo suburbs. The road's surroundings remain mixed through its intersection with Transit Road (NY 78) north of Depew's village center. After Transit Road, Walden Avenue enters the town of Lancaster and crosses the northern fringe of the village of Lancaster, connecting to Central Avenue (County Route 57 or CR 57), the village's main north–south street.

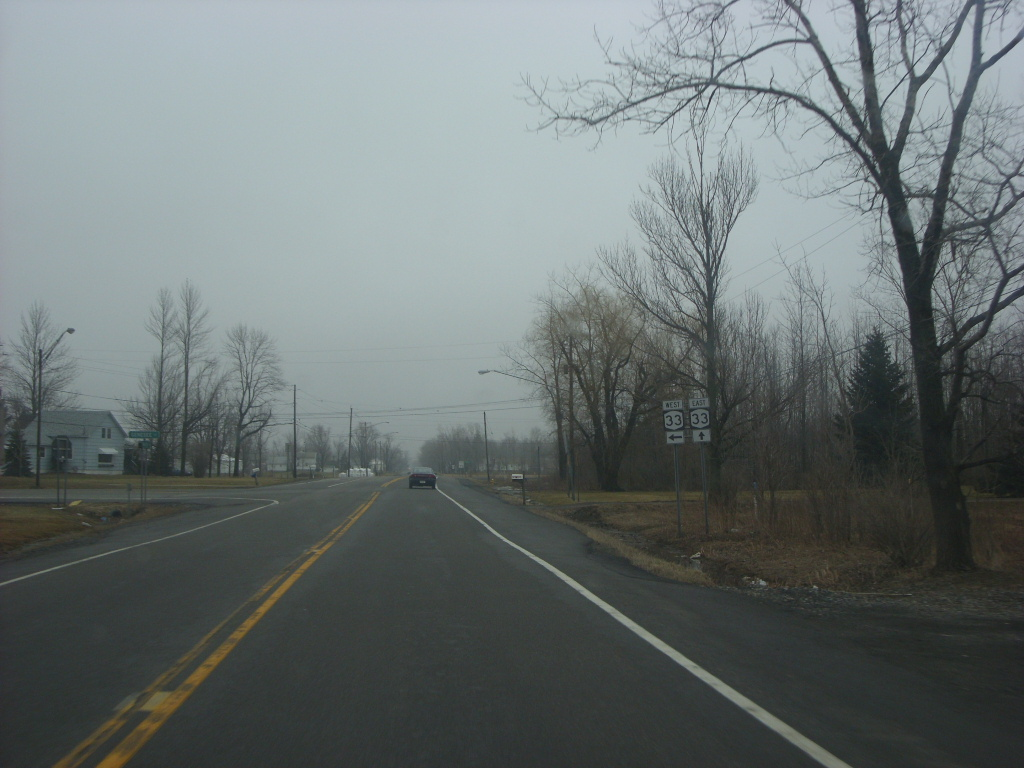
East end of Walden Avenue at NY 33 in Alden

East of the village of Lancaster, the development along Walden Avenue begins to taper off as the constant homes and businesses slowly give way to large stretches of wooded areas. Still, the highway initially passes several cul-de-sacs leading away from the northern side of the road and a number of industrial buildings situated adjacent to the CSX mainline, here designated as the Rochester Subdivision line. This trend changes again after just 1 mile (1.6 km) as the isolated homes on the north side are supplanted by equally isolated industrial warehouses. Walden Avenue eventually follows the CSX mainline into the town of Alden, where development drops off even further. It passes north of the Wende Correctional Facility and serves a small number of commercial and industrial complexes on its way to an intersection with Genesee Street (NY 33). Walden Avenue and NY 952Q end here, while NY 33 continues onto the straight route as Genesee Street.

== History ==
The section of Walden Avenue between the Buffalo city line and NY 33 in Alden was originally a county road maintained by Erie County. On April 1, 1980, ownership and maintenance of the road was transferred to the state of New York as part of a highway maintenance swap between the two levels of government. The new, 14-mile (23 km) state highway was subsequently designated as the unsigned NY 952Q. The route is the longest reference route in the state that is not associated with a parkway.

== Major intersections ==
The entire route is in Erie County.

Location	mi	km	Destinations	Notes
Cheektowaga	0.00	0.00	Walden Avenue west	Continuation into Buffalo at the city line
Cheektowaga	0.77	1.24	NY 240 (Harlem Road)	
Cheektowaga	1.68	2.70	I-90 (New York Thruway)	Exit 52 on I-90 / Thruway
Cheektowaga	2.33	3.75	NY 277 (Union Road)	
Depew	5.29	8.51	NY 78 (Transit Road)	
Town of Alden	14.08	22.66	NY 33 (Genesee Street)	
1.000 mi = 1.609 km; 1.000 km = 0.621 mi
