= New York State Route 263 =

State highway in Erie County, New York, United States

New York State Route 263
- Map of western New York with NY 263 highlighted in red

Route information
- Maintained by NYSDOT
- Length: 10.47 mi (16.85 km)
- Existed: c. 1931–present

Major junctions
- South end: US 62 in Amherst
- NY 324 in Amherst; I-290 in Amherst; I-990 in Amherst; NY 270 in Amherst
- North end: NY 78 on Amherst–Clarence town line

Location
- Country: United States
- State: New York
- County: Erie

Highway system
- New York Highways; Interstate; US; State; Reference; Parkways
← NY 262	→ NY 264

New York State Route 263 (NY 263) is a state highway located entirely within the town of Amherst in Erie County, New York, in the United States. It extends from just north of the northeast corner of the city of Buffalo in a roughly northeast direction almost straight to just south of the north county line. The road is named Millersport Highway north of Eggert Road in Amherst for the community at its northern terminus. The section between its southern terminus at U.S. Route 62 (US 62) and the Eggert Road intersection is named Grover Cleveland Highway.

While the construction of Interstate 990 (I-990) has diminished NY 263's importance as the major route for traffic from Buffalo to Lockport, traffic must continue on NY 263 past the northern terminus of I-990 to complete the trip to Lockport.

== Route description ==
The south end of NY 263 is at Bailey Avenue (US 62), a short distance north of the Buffalo city line in Amherst. Like US 62, NY 263 in this area is a busy shopping strip for Eggertsville, the surrounding suburban neighborhood. This section is called the Grover Cleveland Highway after former Buffalo mayor, New York governor and US President Grover Cleveland. It soon crosses two of the northern Buffalo area's important arteries, Sheridan Drive (NY 324) and the Youngmann Expressway (I-290).

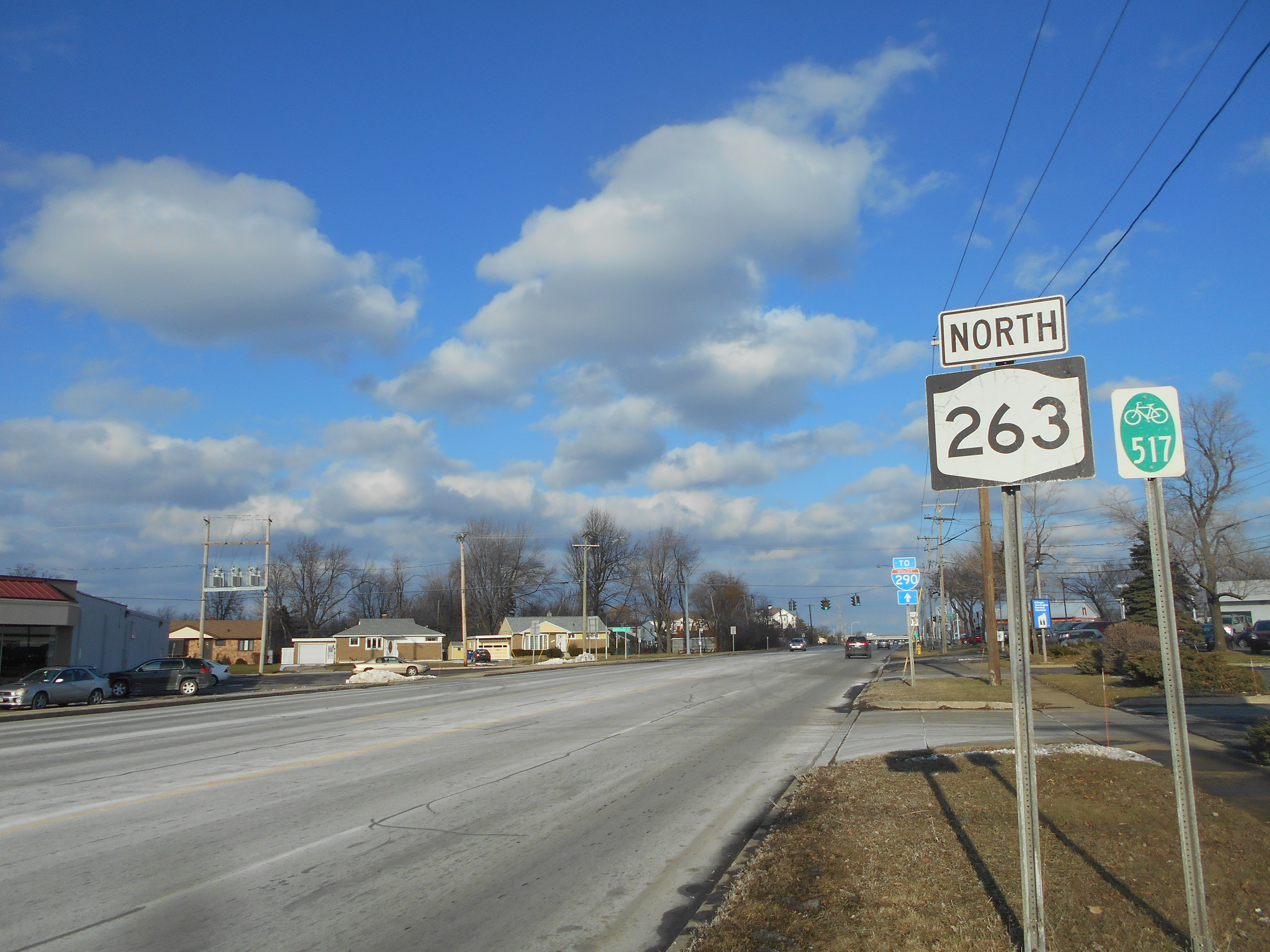
NY 263 northbound after NY 324 in Amherst

The stores that have been almost continuously lining the road abate shortly after the interstate when it makes its only deviation from its straight course, curving around the north campus of SUNY Buffalo, where it was relocated in the early 1970s. Past the campus and a nearby office park, the road narrows to two lanes in the small suburban hamlet of Getzville, where NY 270 heads due north as Campbell Boulevard.

North of Getzville the road continues straight through the much less developed, and more wooded, lands of East Amherst. After several miles, I-990 reaches its current end when both roadways terminate at the west side of the highway. NY 263's reaches its northern terminus at Transit Road (NY 78) approximately a half mile south of the county line of Niagara County in an area called Millersport, which straddles the county line and gives the entire highway its name.

== History ==
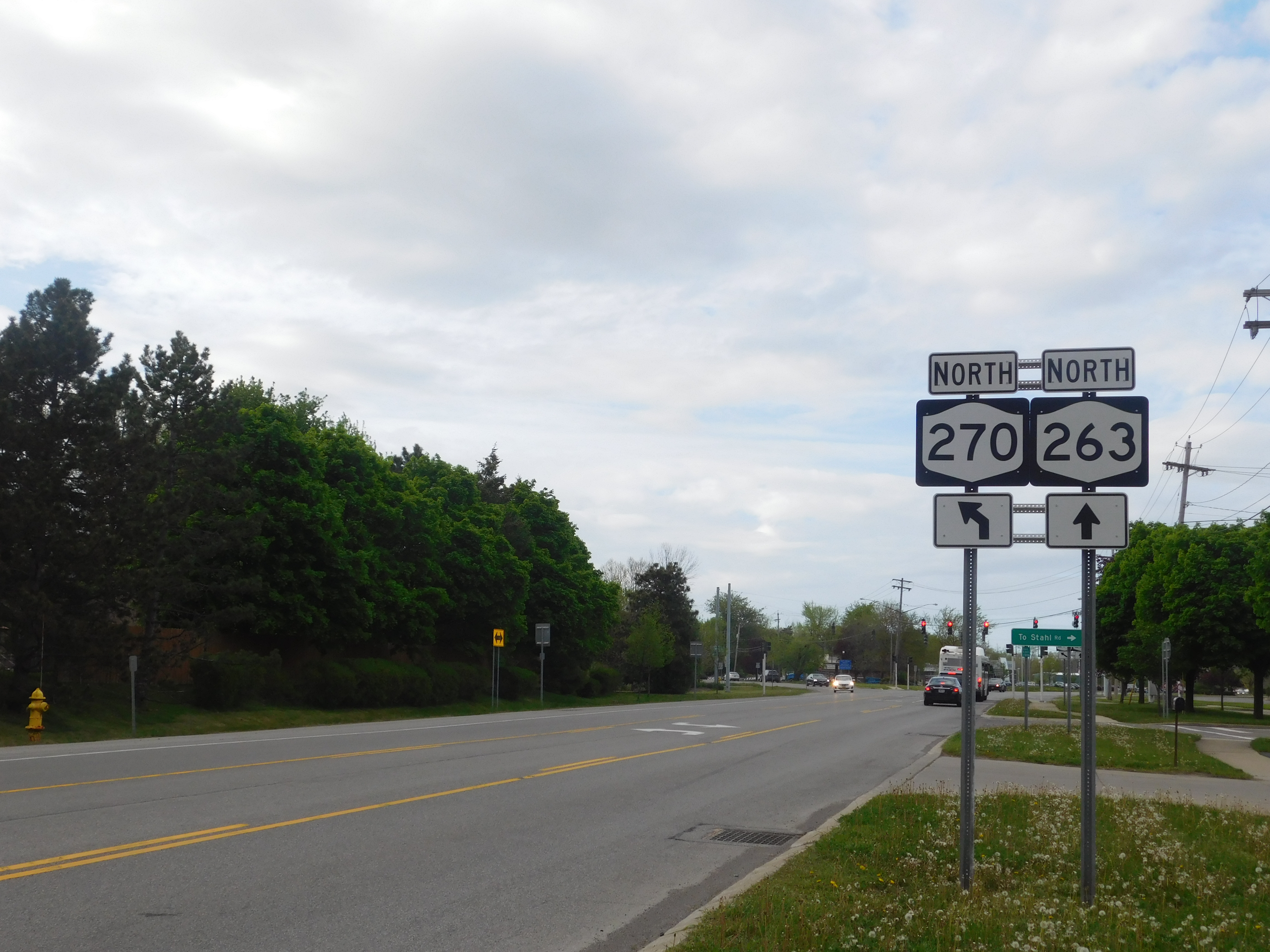
The junction of NY 270 and NY 263 in Amherst, shown here, was NY 263's original southern terminus.

In the 1930 renumbering of state highways in New York, the portion of what is now NY 263 south of Getzville was designated as part of NY 270. NY 263 was assigned by the following year; however, it initially followed a significantly different alignment than it does today. At the time, the route extended from NY 270 south of Getzville to NY 93 northwest of Akron by way of Millersport. West of Millersport, NY 263 utilized a short portion of its current alignment before taking a more northerly path along Hopkins Road and Tonawanda Creek Road. At Millersport, the route overlapped with NY 78 south to Wolcott Road, from where it continued northeast through Clarence on Wolcott and Goodrich Roads.

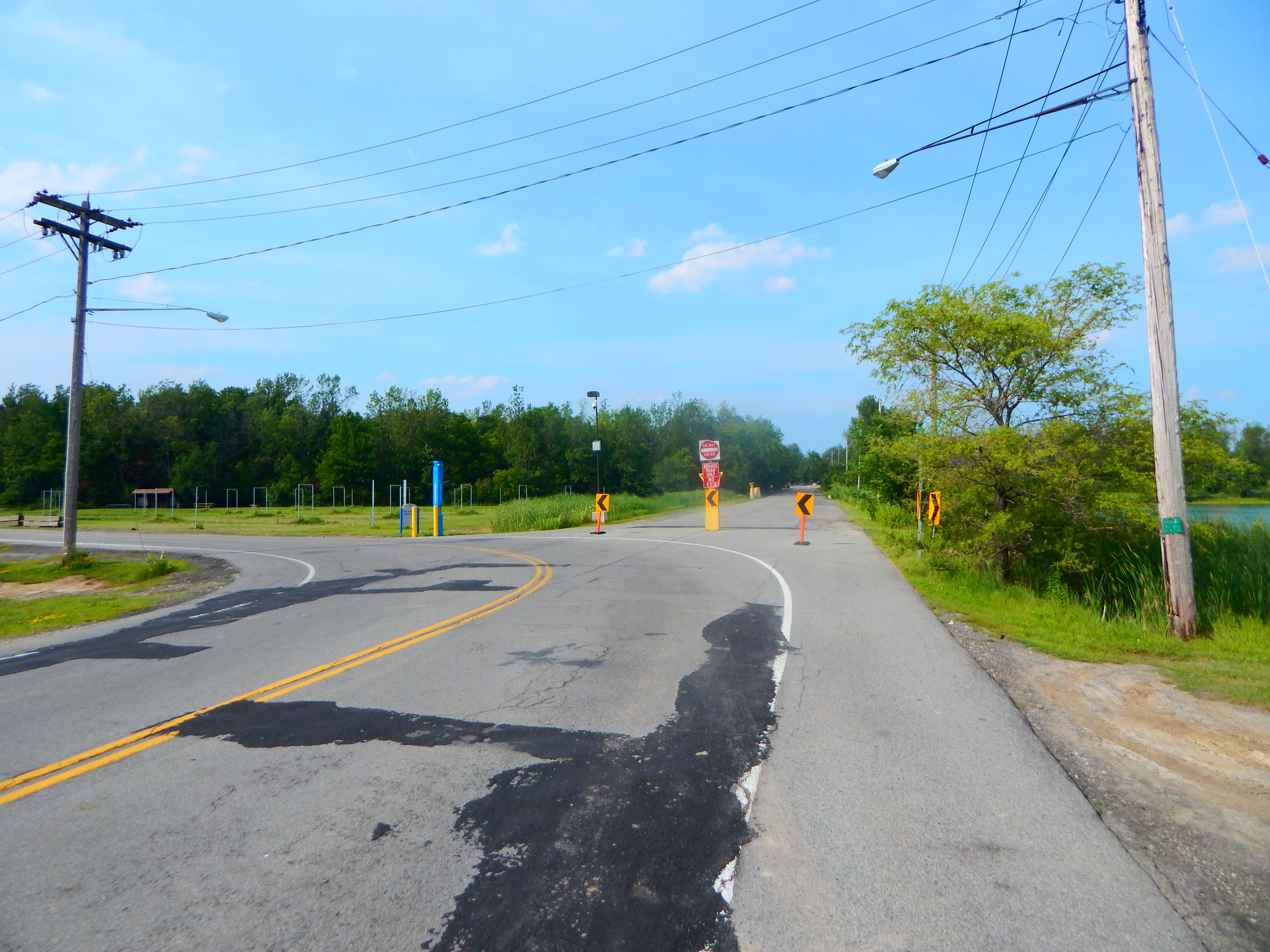
The former alignment of NY 263 through the University of Buffalo campus in Amherst, with an old reference marker on the right-hand side

At the north end of Goodrich Road, located on the southern bank of Tonawanda Creek, NY 263 curved to the east, following Tonawanda Creek Road once again to Salt Road. Here, NY 263 veered southward, continuing on Salt Road to Hunts Corners–Akron Road. At this junction, it turned one final time to follow Hunts Corners–Akron Road east to NY 93 near Akron. NY 263 was realigned c. 1934 to use Tonawanda Creek Road between NY 78 and Goodrich Road. It was altered again by the following year to continue south along Salt Road from Hunts Corners–Akron Road to NY 5 in the hamlet of Clarence. Around the same time, NY 263 was realigned onto a newly constructed extension of Millersport Highway between Hopkins Road and Millersport.

NY 263 was realigned c. 1938 to overlap with NY 78 north to NY 31 in Lockport. Its former alignment east of NY 78 became a realignment of NY 268. In the early 1940s, NY 263 was extended southwest to Buffalo over NY 270. Initially, NY 263 overlapped with NY 270 along Millersport Highway; however, the overlap was eliminated in the late 1940s after NY 270 was truncated to begin at NY 263 in Getzville. NY 263 was cut back to its current northern terminus in Millersport on January 1, 1962. The route was re-extended to Clarence c. 1974, replacing NY 268; however, the extension was short-lived as NY 263 was pulled back to its junction with NY 78 by 1977.

== Major intersections ==
The entire route is in Erie County.

Location	mi	km	Destinations	Notes
Amherst	0.00	0.00	US 62 (Bailey Avenue)	Southern terminus of NY 263
Amherst	1.36	2.19	NY 324 (Sheridan Drive)	
Amherst	1.80	2.90	I-290 (Youngmann Expressway)	Exit 5 (I-290)
Amherst	2.33	3.75	Maple Road (CR 192)	Interchange
Amherst	2.70	4.35	Audubon Parkway/University at Buffalo North Campus	Interchange
Amherst	4.62	7.44	NY 270 north (Campbell Boulevard)	Southern terminus of NY 270
Amherst	7.36	11.84	I-990 south (Lockport Expressway)	Exit 5 (I-990); northern terminus of I-990
Amherst–Clarence line	10.47	16.85	NY 78 (Transit Road)	Northern terminus of NY 263
1.000 mi = 1.609 km; 1.000 km = 0.621 mi
