= Millersport, New York =

Hamlet in New York, United States

Coordinates: 43°05′05″N 78°41′48″W

Millersport is a hamlet in the town of Clarence in Erie County, New York, United States. It is the namesake of the Millersport Highway, known legally as New York State Route 263.

Millersport is the childhood home of American author Joyce Carol Oates.
