= List of county routes in Erie County, New York =

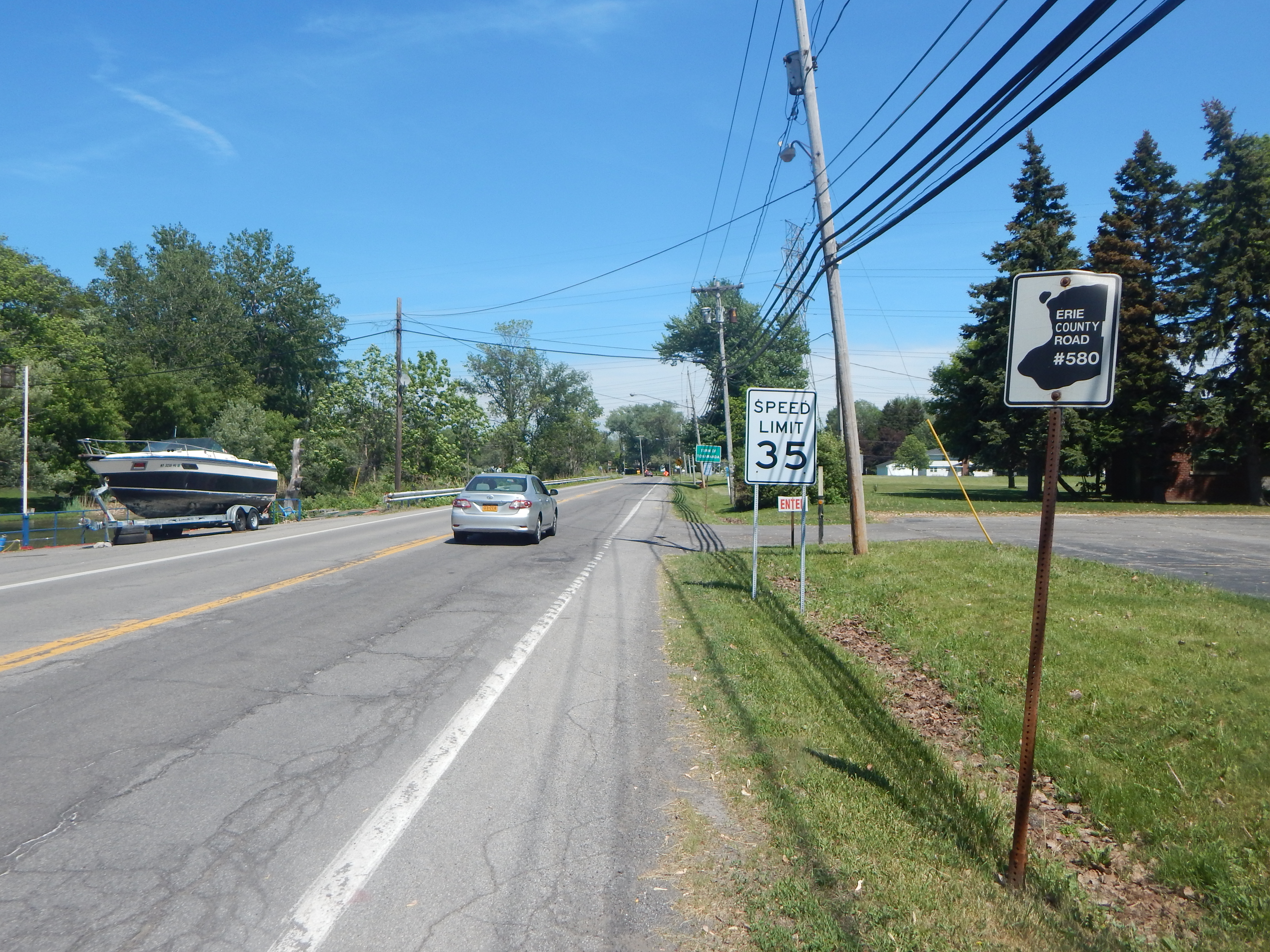
- Route marker for county routes in Erie County (CR 580 in Tonawanda)

Highway names
- Interstates: Interstate X (I-X)
- US Highways: U.S. Route X (US X)
- State: New York State Route X (NY X)
- County: County Route X (CR X)

System links
- New York Highways; Interstate; US; State; Reference; Parkways

Most of the county routes in Erie County, New York, act as primary roads in the less developed areas and also serve to interconnect the various villages and hamlets of the county. Not all routes are signed. All routes are maintained by the Erie County Department of Public Works, Division of Highways. The area has over 300 routes, due to the urbanizing of Erie County. Routes 250 through 511 all run in a general northeast–southwest pattern. No other patterns exist in Erie County.

The county route system in Erie County dates to 1916, designed to be a system to help connect future state highways in the county. The first nine county roads were assigned at that time.

== Routes 1-100 ==
Route	Length (mi)	Length (km)	From	Via	To	Notes
CR 1	3.31	5.33	US 20 in Alden village	Alden–Crittenden Road	NY 33 in Alden town	Assigned in 1916.
CR 2	8.48	13.65	Niagara county line	Tonawanda Creek Road in Amherst	NY 78	Assigned in 1916.
CR 3	2.20	3.54	Clinton Street in Cheektowaga/Elma	Transit Road	Broadway in Depew	Assigned in 1916. Former number; now part of US 20/NY 78.
CR 4	6.45	10.38	CR 44 / CR 51 / CR 169 in Hamburg town	Abbott Road	Buffalo city line in Lackawanna	Assigned in 1916.
CR 5	1.92	3.09	CR 111 in Evans	Lake Street	Angola village line	Assigned in 1916.
CR 6	4.12	6.63	US 20A in East Aurora	Pine Street and East Aurora–Porterville Road	NY 954G in Marilla	Assigned in 1916.
CR 7	1.9	3.06	NY 16 in Holland	Savage Road	CR 27	Former number; now part of CR 225.
CR 8	2.6	4.18	NY 33 in Alden	Akron–Crittenden Road	NY 5 / CR 246	Assigned in 1916. Former number; now part of CR 246.
CR 9	6.69	10.77	Cattaraugus Indian Reservation line in Brant	Brant Reservation, Brant–Angola and Old Eden–Evans Center roads, South and North Main streets	NY 5 in Evans	Assigned in 1916. Portion north of NY 249 designated as NY 323 until 1980.
CR 10	0.60	0.97	NY 952Q	Wende Road in Alden town	NY 33	
CR 11	9.81	15.79	CR 577	East River Road in Grand Island	CR 249	Assigned by 1917.
CR 16	0.90	1.45	NY 954G	East Avenue in Marilla	CR 356	
CR 18	6.46	10.40	CR 127 in Evans	Sturgeon Point and Derby roads	CR 32 in Eden	Assigned by 1917.
CR 21	2.90	4.67	NY 277	Losson Road in Cheektowaga	US 20 / NY 78	Assigned by 1917.
CR 23	1.50	2.41	CR 338 in Lancaster town	Penora Street	US 20 in Depew	
CR 24	4.74	7.63	NY 78	Lapp Road in Clarence	CR 560	
CR 27	9.71	15.63	CR 49 / CR 198 / CR 409 / CR 432 in Concord	Allen Road	NY 16 in Sardinia	First 0.12 miles (0.19 km) are concurrent with NY 240
CR 28	9.71	15.63	CR 227 in Boston	South Abbott Road	CR 44 in Hamburg town	
CR 30	4.44	7.15	CR 27 in Concord	Glenwood–East Concord Road	CR 240 in Colden town	Entire length concurrent with NY 240
CR 32	7.29	11.73	CR 9 in Evans	Old Eden–Evans Center and Eden–Evans Center roads, West Church Street	US 62 in Eden	
CR 33	11.16	17.96	CR 408 in Colden	Center Street	US 20A in East Aurora	
CR 34	1.36	2.19	CR 111	Lotus Point Road in Brant	NY 5 / NY 249	
CR 36	2.6	4.18	CR 335/CR 343	Town Line Road	NY 33 in Alden town	Former number; now part of CR 335.
CR 37	5.59	9.00	NY 78	Greiner Road in Clarence	CR 560	
CR 39	3.02	4.86	NY 75 / NY 249	Langford–New Oregon Road in North Collins	Concord town line	
CR 40	1.35	2.17	CR 508	Collins Center–Zoar Road in Collins	NY 39	
CR 41	8.27	13.31	NY 249 in Brant	Versailles Plank Road	CR 476 in Evans	
CR 42	4.77	7.68	Niagara county line in Clarence	Rapids Road	NY 93 in Newstead	
CR 43	1.15	1.85	CR 559 / CR 560	Rapids Road in Clarence	CR 42	
CR 44	1.70	2.74	CR 4 / CR 51 / CR 169 in Hamburg town	Armor–Duells Road	NY 952J / CR 463 in Orchard Park town	
CR 45	5.83	9.38	CR 301	Dodge Road in Amherst	NY 78	
CR 46	3.2	5.15	CR 390	Hunters Creek Road	US 20A in Wales	Former number; now part of CR 382.
CR 47	4.65	7.48	NY 240 in Aurora	Mill Road	US 20A in East Aurora	
CR 49	6.42	10.33	CR 50 / CR 73 / CR 106	Genesee Road in Concord	NY 240 / CR 198 / CR 409 / CR 432	
CR 50	2.70	4.35	CR 49 / CR 73 / CR 106	Wyandale Road in Concord	North Collins town line (continues as CR 39)	
CR 51	1.79	2.88	US 62 in Hamburg village	Clark Street	CR 4 / CR 44 / CR 169 in Hamburg town	
CR 54	0.70	1.13	Cattaraugus Indian Reservation line	Seneca Street in North Collins	US 62	
CR 55	3.1	4.99	CR 47	Blakeley Corners Road	NY 16 / CR 85	Former number; now part of CR 85.
CR 57	1.44	2.32	CSX railroad tracks in Lancaster village	Central Avenue	CR 161 / CR 276 in Lancaster town	
CR 58	4.0	6.44	CR 9/CR 93	Milestrip Road	US 62 in North Collins	Former number; now part of CR 93.
CR 62	1.80	2.90	Cattaraugus county line in Concord	Cattaraugus Road	NY 240 in Springville	
CR 64	3.85	6.20	NY 33 in Alden town	South Newstead Road	NY 5 in Newstead	Until 1935, CR 64 was designated as an extension of NY 93.
CR 65	6.42	10.33	CR 127 in Hamburg town	Lakeview Road and Evans Street	US 62 in Hamburg village	
CR 67	3.30	5.31	CR 541 in Aurora	Emery Road	NY 16 in Wales	
CR 68	2.55	4.10	NY 78	Stahley Road in Clarence	CR 217	
CR 70	1.0	1.61	CR 354/CR 349	Williston Road	CR 329/CR 520	Former number; now part of CR 349.
CR 73	7.76	12.49	CR 498 in North Collins	Genesee Road	CR 49 / CR 50 / CR 106 in Concord	
CR 74	4.90	7.89	Gowanda village line	Gowanda–Zoar Road in Collins	CR 457 / CR 508	Section from CR 507 on east was formerly designated as CR 509.
CR 75	6.03	9.70	West River Road	Whitehaven Road in Grand Island	CR 11	
CR 82	2.24	3.60	Cattaraugus county line in Concord (continues as CR 12)	Mill and Buffalo streets	NY 39 in Springville	
CR 84	2.40	3.86	NY 240	Davis Road in Aurora	US 20A	
CR 85	4.82	7.76	CR 47 in Aurora	Blakeley Corners Road	CR 175 / CR 383 in Wales	
CR 87	6.49	10.44	NY 324	Hopkins Road in Amherst	CR 2	
CR 90	0.15	0.24	CR 6	Porterville Road in Marilla	NY 954G	
CR 91	0.52	0.84	CR 137 (at I-90 / NYST)	Slade Avenue in West Seneca	NY 240	
CR 92	3.2	5.15	CR 85/CR 383	Center Line Road Wales	CR 391/CR 175	Former number; now part of CR 175.
CR 93	6.34	10.20	Cattaraugus Indian Reservation line in Brant	Milestrip Road	US 62 in North Collins	
CR 95	1.25	2.01	NY 16 / NY 78 / CR 572	Seneca Street in Elma	CR 328 / CR 330	
CR 96	1.30	2.09	CR 111	Bennett Road in Evans	NY 5 / CR 9	

== Routes 101-200 ==
Route	Length (mi)	Length (km)	From	Via	To	Notes
CR 103 (1)	0.38	0.61	CR 4	Webster Corners Road in Orchard Park	CR 461	Gap in designation at CR 461
CR 103 (2)	1.15	1.85	US 20	Webster Corners Road in Orchard Park	NY 240	
CR 104	1.36	2.19	CR 122 in Hamburg town	Pleasant Avenue	NY 75 in Hamburg village	
CR 105	0.80	1.29	CR 341	Nichter Road in Lancaster town	CR 139	
CR 106	3.10	4.99	NY 39	Morton Corners–Wyandale Road in Concord	CR 49 / CR 50 / CR 73	
CR 107	1.83	2.95	NY 952Q	Pine Ridge Road in Cheektowaga	Maryvale Drive	
CR 109	2.36	3.80	Buffalo city line	Indian Church Road in West Seneca	NY 277	
CR 110	3.91	6.29	NY 391 in Hamburg village	Newton Street and Newton Road	NY 277 in Orchard Park town	
CR 111	7.97	12.83	Cattaraugus Indian Reservation line in Brant	Lake Shore Road	CR 127 / CR 183 in Evans	
CR 112	0.75	1.21	CR 33	South Street in East Aurora	NY 16	
CR 113	1.70	2.74	US 20	Sandridge Road and Wende Avenue in Alden town	NY 952Q	
CR 114	7.97	12.83	Cattaraugus Indian Reservation line in Brant	Lake Shore Road	Evangola State Park	Former number; now part of CR 111.
CR 115	1.80	2.90	CR 215 / CR 285	Sand Hill Road in Newstead	CR 42	
CR 118	4.07	6.55	CR 307 in Kenmore	Colvin Boulevard	CR 580 in Tonawanda town	Gap in designation at NY 425
CR 119	2.45	3.94	CR 307 in Kenmore	Elmwood Avenue	CR 306 (at I-290) in Tonawanda town	
CR 121	1.00	1.61	South Cascade Drive	Waverly Street in Springville	NY 39	
CR 122	2.69	4.33	NY 5	Amsdell Road in Hamburg town	CR 104	
CR 127	8.12	13.07	CR 111 / CR 183 in Evans	Lake Shore and Old Lake Shore roads	NY 5 in Hamburg town	
CR 129	2.16	3.48	Delaware Road	Highland Parkway and Englewood Avenue in Tonawanda town	CR 307	
CR 130	4.61	7.42	Buffalo city line in Amherst	Eggert Road	NY 425 / CR 118 in Tonawanda town	
CR 133	3.31	5.33	US 20	Pleasant Avenue in Hamburg town	CR 122	
CR 134	0.60	0.97	NY 75 in Hamburg town	Legion Drive	US 62 in Hamburg village	
CR 136	0.90	1.45	US 20A in Orchard Park town	Thorn Avenue and Thorn Street	NY 240 / NY 277 in Orchard Park village	Former number; decommissioned by 2014 and turned over to Orchard Park for maintenance.
CR 137	1.56	2.51	CR 4 in Lackawanna	Ridge Road	CR 215 in West Seneca	
CR 139	3.53	5.68	US 20A	Pavement Road in Lancaster town	NY 33	
CR 140	3.56	5.73	NY 16 / NY 78 / CR 572	Rice Road in Elma	CR 336	
CR 141	2.87	4.62	CR 130	Cleveland Drive in Cheektowaga	CR 245	
CR 142	0.07	0.11	CR 141	Century Road in Cheektowaga	CR 208	
CR 144	1.89	3.04	NY 240	West Falls Road in Aurora	CR 47	
CR 152	1.20	1.93	NY 263	Bailey Avenue in Amherst	NY 324	Entire length concurrent with US 62
CR 153	0.75	1.21	NY 277	Bennett Road in Cheektowaga	CR 523	
CR 154	1.10	1.77	NY 16 / CR 571	Lein Road in West Seneca	CR 325	
CR 155	8.02	12.91	CR 333 in Lancaster town	Ransom Road	NY 5 in Clarence	
CR 157	0.65	1.05	NY 952Q	Home Road in Alden town	NY 33	
CR 161	3.82	6.15	NY 78	Pleasant View Drive in Lancaster town	CR 139	
CR 162	2.22	3.57	NY 75	Sowles Road in Hamburg town	CR 169 / CR 204	
CR 163	4.55	7.32	CR 560 in Clarence	Clarence Center Road	NY 93 in Akron	
CR 164	0.35	0.56	CR 338	Lake Avenue in Lancaster town	Lancaster village line	
CR 165	1.63	2.62	NY 240	Cayuga Creek Road in Cheektowaga	CR 207	
CR 166	3.10	4.99	CR 113	North Road in Alden town	Genesee county line	
CR 167	0.90	1.45	NY 93	Parkview Drive in Akron	CR 573	
CR 169	1.00	1.61	CR 204	Bayview Road in Hamburg town	CR 4	Formerly continued north on Bayview Road and west on Beetow Road to US 62.
CR 170	1.01	1.63	NY 266	Sawyer Avenue in Tonawanda town	CR 189	
CR 171	1.06	1.71	CR 130	Sweet Home Road in Amherst	CR 192 / NY 952T	
CR 172	1.41	2.27	CR 336 / CR 574 in Elma	Hemstreet Road	CR 6 in Marilla	
CR 173	1.77	2.85	CR 294	Heim Street in Amherst	CR 45	
CR 174	0.85	1.37	US 62	North Boston Road in Eden	NY 75	
CR 175	5.44	8.75	CR 85 / CR 383	Center Line Road in Wales	Wyoming county line	
CR 176	1.5	2.41	CR 18	Versailles Plank Road	CR 476 in Evans	Former number; now part of CR 41.
CR 177	2.00	3.22	US 20	Taylor Road in Orchard Park town	NY 277	
CR 181	6.40	10.30	CR 412 / CR 413	Sharp Street in Concord	CR 228	
CR 183	0.86	1.38	CR 96	Dennis Road in Evans	CR 111 / CR 127	
CR 186	3.48	5.60	CR 45	New Road in Amherst	Niagara county line	
CR 187	2.83	4.55	CR 204 in Lackawanna	Willett and Berg roads	NY 240 in West Seneca	
CR 189	1.69	2.72	NY 950C	Kenmore Avenue in Tonawanda	CR 550	First 0.13 miles (0.21 km) concurrent with NY 324
CR 192	6.40	10.30	US 62	Maple Road in Amherst	NY 78	
CR 194	1.69	2.72	CR 313	Maryvale Drive in Cheektowaga	CR 245	
CR 195	1.01	1.63	NY 5 in Williamsville	Evans Street	NY 324	
CR 196	2.59	4.17	NY 384	Brighton Road	US 62	
CR 198	3.97	6.39	Cattaraugus county line in Concord	Vaughn Street	CR 409 in Concord	Entire length concurrent with NY 240
CR 199	1.13	1.82	CR 275	Shisler Road in Clarence	NY 5	
CR 200	4.85	7.81	NY 5 in Hamburg town	Lake Avenue	US 20 in Orchard Park town	

== Routes 201-300 ==
Route	Length (mi)	Length (km)	From	Via	To	Notes
CR 201	0.56	0.90	Sugar Road	Eggert Road in Cheektowaga	Davidson Avenue	
CR 204	6.25	10.06	NY 391	McKinley Parkway in Hamburg town	CR 187	
CR 207	2.36	3.80	Buffalo city line	William Street in Cheektowaga	NY 277	
CR 208	1.88	3.03	Buffalo city line in Cheektowaga	Kensington Avenue	NY 5 in Amherst	
CR 215	5.53	8.90	NY 240 / NY 950M in West Seneca	Seneca Street	US 20 / NY 78 / CR 572 in Elma	Sections are concurrent with NY 16
CR 216	8.46	13.62	NY 5	Goodrich Road in Clarence	Niagara county line	Section south of Wolcott Road (then NY 268) was designated as NY 265 from ca. 1931 to ca. 1936
CR 217	5.92	9.53	NY 78	Clarence Center Road in Clarence	CR 560	Was designated as NY 266 from ca. 1931 to ca. 1935; at the time CR 560 was part of NY 267.
CR 218	3.73	6.00	CR 560 in Clarence	Hunts Corners Road	NY 93 in Newstead	
CR 220	6.25	10.06	CR 482 in Eden	East Eden Road	NY 391 in Hamburg village	
CR 221	0.81	1.30	NY 5	Beach Road in Evans	CR 32	
CR 222	3.02	4.86	CR 227 / CR 233 in Boston	Boston–Colden Road	NY 240 in Colden	
CR 224	1.9	3.06	CR 225	Allen Road	NY 16 in Chaffee	Former number; now part of CR 27.
CR 225	7.10	11.43	Cattaraugus county line in Sardinia	Savage Road	NY 16 in Holland	Section south of CR 27 was part of NY 279 (along with the portion of CR 27 east of CR 225) from c. 1931 to c. 1933
CR 226	2.30	3.70	NY 16	Vermont Street in Holland	CR 382	
CR 227	6.41	10.32	Concord town line	Boston State Road in Boston	NY 277 / NY 391 / CR 437	
CR 228	8.28	13.33	NY 39 in Springville	Springville-Boston Road	Boston town line in Colden	
CR 230	0.70	1.13	CR 231	West Union Street in Hamburg village	NY 75	Former number; decommissioned by 2014 and turned over to Hamburg village for maintenance.
CR 231	0.21	0.34	CR 65	West Avenue in Hamburg village	CR 230	Former number; decommissioned by 2014 and turned over to Hamburg village for maintenance.
CR 232	8.28	13.33	US 62	North Ellicott Creek Road in Amherst	NY 952T	
CR 233	2.34	3.77	CR 437	Rice Hill and West Tillen roads in Boston	CR 222 / CR 227	
CR 240	4.95	7.97	NY 240 / CR 30 in Colden	Holland–Glenwood Road	NY 16	
CR 241	2.61	4.20	US 20A in East Aurora	Maple Street	CR 574 in Elma	
CR 242	8.55	13.76	NY 16 / NY 78 / CR 572 in Aurora	Bowen Road	US 20 in Lancaster town	
CR 243	2.31	3.72	NY 354 in Elma	Aurora Street	CR 523 in Lancaster village	
CR 245	1.41	2.27	NY 952A	Cayuga Road in Cheektowaga	CR 290	
CR 246	4.87	7.84	NY 33 in Alden	Crittenden–Murrays Corners and Akron-Crittenden roads	CR 248 / CR 250 / CR 252 in Newstead	
CR 247	3.00	4.83	NY 78	Wolcott Road in Clarence	CR 216	
CR 248	1.10	1.77	CR 167	East Avenue in Akron	CR 246 / CR 250 / CR 252	
CR 249	5.77	9.29	CR 577	Baseline Road in Grand Island	CR 11	
CR 250	3.47	5.58	CR 246 / CR 248 / CR 252	Scotland Road in Newstead	Tonawanda Indian Reservation line	
CR 251	1.25	2.01	NY 5	Barnum Road in Newstead	CR 163	
CR 252	0.85	1.37	CR 246 / CR 248 / CR 250	Indian Falls Road in Newstead	Genesee county line (continues as CR 11)	
CR 253	1.90	3.06	CR 250	Carney Road in Newstead	NY 93	
CR 254	0.55	0.89	CR 42	Greenbush Road in Newstead	CR 255	
CR 255	1.50	2.41	CR 254	Swift Mills Road in Newstead	CR 261	
CR 256	2.30	3.70	CR 115	Meahl Road in Newstead	NY 93	
CR 257	2.20	3.54	CR 259	Fletcher Road in Newstead	CR 42	
CR 258	2.20	3.54	CR 42	Burdick Road in Newstead	Niagara County line (continues as CR 110)	
CR 259	2.40	3.86	CR 258	Tonawanda Creek Road in Newstead	NY 93	
CR 260	1.10	1.77	NY 93	Koepsel Road in Newstead	CR 261	
CR 261	3.85	6.20	NY 93	Cedar Street in Newstead	Niagara county line	
CR 262	1.15	1.85	CR 163	Hake Road in Newstead	NY 93	
CR 263	1.00	1.61	NY 5	Cummings Road in Newstead	CR 163	
CR 264	1.70	2.74	CR 64	Dorsch Road in Newstead	CR 246	
CR 265	1.90	3.06	CR 64	Steiner Road in Newstead	CR 246	
CR 266	2.10	3.38	CR 268	Nice Road in Newstead	CR 64	
CR 267	2.30	3.70	CR 268 in Alden town	Buckwheat Road	CR 64 in Newstead	
CR 268	3.25	5.23	NY 33 in Alden town	North Millgrove Road	NY 5	
CR 269	4.42	7.11	NY 5	Strickler Road in Clarence	CR 24	
CR 270	0.35	0.56	CR 217	Railroad Street in Clarence	CR 216	Former number.
CR 271	0.40	0.64	CR 145	Bodine Road in Clarence	CR 272	Former number.
CR 272	0.60	0.97	CR 273	Schurr Road in Clarence	NY 5	
CR 273	2.15	3.46	CR 272	Stage Road in Clarence	CR 268	
CR 274			CR 288	Wiltse Road in Clarence	CR 199	Former number.
CR 275	4.42	7.11	NY 78	Wehrle Drive in Clarence	CR 199	
CR 276	4.66	7.50	CR 57 / CR 161 in Lancaster town	Harris Hill Road	CR 277 in Clarence	
CR 277	3.00	4.83	NY 78	Roll Road in Clarence	CR 216	
CR 278	3.06	4.92	NY 5	Thompson Road in Clarence	CR 217	
CR 279	3.78	6.08	CR 275	Shimerville Road in Clarence	CR 217	
CR 280	0.90	1.45	CR 277	Newhouse Road in Clarence	CR 217	
CR 281	0.88	1.42	CR 68	Conner Road in Clarence	CR 282	
CR 282	5.58	8.98	NY 78	County Road in Clarence	CR 560	
CR 283	1.90	3.06	CR 217	Heise Road in Clarence	CR 560	
CR 285	4.37	7.03	CR 216 in Clarence	Keller Road	CR 115 / CR 218 in Newstead	
CR 288	1.90	3.06	NY 33 in Lancaster town	Gunnville Road	NY 5 in Clarence	
CR 289	0.55	0.89	CR 290	Garrison Road in Williamsville	NY 5	
CR 290	4.90	7.89	CR 208	Wehrle Drive in Amherst	NY 78	
CR 294	4.39	7.07	NY 324	North Forest Road in Amherst	CR 45	
CR 295	2.08	3.35	CR 45	Casey Road in Amherst	NY 78	
CR 297	2.60	4.18	CR 87	Smith Road in Amherst	NY 78	
CR 299	6.40	10.30	US 62	East Robinson and North French roads in Amherst	NY 78	
CR 300			CR 171 / CR 301	Rensch Road in Amherst	NY 270 (now NY 263)	Former number.

== Routes 301-400 ==
Route	Length (mi)	Length (km)	From	Via	To	Notes
CR 301	2.35	3.78	NY 952T	Sweet Home Road in Amherst	CR 2	
CR 303	1.00	1.61	Tonawanda city line	Colvin Avenue and Colvin Avenue Extension in Tonawanda town	Raintree Parkway	Former number; decommissioned in 2014 and turned over to Tonawanda for maintenance.
CR 306	0.47	0.76	NY 265	Knoche Road in Tonawanda town	NY 384	
CR 307	0.47	0.76	NY 265 in Tonawanda town	Kenmore Avenue	NY 5 in Amherst	
CR 308	3.98	6.41	Stony Point Road Extension	Stony Point Road in Grand Island	CR 11	
CR 309	1.08	1.74	CR 249	Huth Road in Grand Island	CR 308	
CR 310	1.67	2.69	West River Road	Long Road in Grand Island	CR 249	Portion overlaps NY 324
CR 313	1.71	2.75	NY 952A	Beach Road in Cheektowaga	CR 290	
CR 315	0.75	1.21	Buffalo city line	Dingens Street in Cheektowaga	NY 240	
CR 316	5.10	8.21	NY 952A	George Urban Boulevard in Cheektowaga	NY 78	
CR 317	1.85	2.98	NY 130 in Depew	Dick Road	NY 952A in Cheektowaga	
CR 319	1.47	2.37	CR 523 in Cheektowaga	Indian and Rowley roads	CR 322 in Depew	
CR 321	2.95	4.75	NY 277	French Road in Cheektowaga	NY 78	
CR 322	3.50	5.63	CR 325 in West Seneca	Borden Road	NY 130 in Depew	
CR 324	2.30	3.70	CR 290	Aero Drive in Cheektowaga	NY 78	
CR 325	3.26	5.25	NY 277 in West Seneca	Seneca Creek Road	CR 327 in Elma	
CR 327	1.50	2.41	CR 330	North Blossom Road in Elma	NY 354	
CR 328	1.50	2.41	CR 330	Winspear Road in Elma	NY 354	
CR 329	5.50	8.85	CR 355	Eastwood Road in Marilla	NY 354	Section north of CR 330 was formerly CR 332.
CR 330	10.74	17.28	US 20 / NY 78 in Elma	Bullis Road	Wyoming county line in Marilla (continues as CR 26)	Section from Marilla town line to Wyoming County line was formerly CR 331.
CR 331	4.67	7.52	CR 335	Bullis Road in Marilla	Wyoming County line	Former number. Now a section of CR 330.
CR 332	2.30	3.70	CR 331	Eastwood Road in Marilla	NY 354	Former number. Now a section of CR 329.
CR 333	2.50	4.02	CR 242	Hall Road in Elma	CR 155	
CR 334	4.05	6.52	CR 574	Creek and Stole roads in Elma	NY 354	
CR 335	7.44	11.97	CR 330 in Elma	Town Line Road	NY 33 in Alden town	
CR 336	5.50	8.85	CR 6 in Aurora	Girdle Road	NY 354 in Elma	
CR 337	3.78	6.08	NY 354 in Elma	Schwartz Road	CR 343 in Lancaster town	
CR 338	4.55	7.32	US 20 / NY 78	William Street in Lancaster town	CR 337	
CR 341	1.76	2.83	US 20	Cemetery Road in Lancaster town	NY 952Q	
CR 343	4.99	8.03	CR 139 in Lancaster town	Westwood Road	CR 113 in Alden town	
CR 346	1.33	2.14	CR 113 in Alden town	West Main Street	US 20 / CR 578 in Alden village	
CR 347	1.50	2.41	CR 166	Peters Corners Road in Alden town	NY 33	Until 1935, CR 347 was part of an extension of NY 93 to Peters Corners.
CR 348	0.80	1.29	NY 952Q	Zoeller Road in Alden town	NY 33	
CR 349	3.55	5.71	NY 954G	Williston Road in Marilla	Wyoming county line	
CR 350	1.73	2.78	NY 952Q	Stony Road in Lancaster town	NY 33	
CR 354	6.40	10.30	CR 402 in Marilla	Three Rod Road	CR 527 in Alden town	
CR 355	3.15	5.07	US 20A in Wales	East Blood Road	Wyoming county line in Marilla	
CR 356	8.71	14.02	US 20A in Wales	Four Rod Road	US 20 in Alden town	Formerly part of NY 358.
CR 362	2.95	4.75	CR 377 in Aurora	North Davis Road	NY 16 / NY 78 / CR 572 in Elma	
CR 363	3.27	5.26	NY 240	East and West Road in West Seneca	CR 364	
CR 364	0.62	1.00	CR 363	Leydecker Road in West Seneca	US 20	
CR 365	3.18	5.12	NY 240 in West Seneca	Michael and Angle roads	NY 187 in Orchard Park	
CR 366	1.91	3.07	NY 240	Reserve Road in West Seneca	US 20	
CR 368	5.71	9.19	NY 277 in Orchard Park	Jewett–Holmwood Road	US 20A in East Aurora	
CR 369	3.94	6.34	NY 240 in Orchard Park	Freeman Road	NY 277 in Orchard Park	
CR 370	3.11	5.01	CR 44	Powers Road in Orchard Park	CR 371	
CR 371	2.70	4.35	CR 401	Scherff Road in Orchard Park	NY 240	
CR 372	1.84	2.96	CR 442 in Orchard Park	Behm Road	NY 240 in Aurora	
CR 373	4.35	7.00	CR 374	Grover Road in Aurora	CR 368	
CR 374	2.80	4.51	CR 144	Falls Road in Aurora	CR 541	
CR 375	0.70	1.13	CR 541 in Aurora	Emery Road	CR 33/CR 67 in Aurora	Former number; now part of CR 67
CR 376	2.01	3.23	US 20A in East Aurora	Knox Road	NY 16 / NY 78 / CR 572 in Aurora	
CR 377	4.11	6.61	NY 187 in Elma	Willardshire Road	NY 16 / NY 78 / CR 572 in Aurora	
CR 378	0.60	0.97	US 20A	Gypsy Lane in Aurora	CR 376	
CR 379	1.35	2.17	CR 380	Darling Road in Aurora	NY 16	
CR 380	6.00	9.66	CR 396	Lewis Road in Aurora	CR 67	
CR 381	1.50	2.41	NY 16	Lapham Road in Aurora	CR 383	
CR 382	9.31	14.98	CR 392	Hunters Creek Road	US 20A in Wales	
CR 383	3.46	5.57	CR 85 / CR 175 in Wales	Hunters Creek Road	CR 6 in Aurora	
CR 384	0.66	1.06	NY 78	Woodchuck Road in Wales	CR 355	Former number.
CR 385	3.10	4.99	NY 78	Schang Road in Wales	Wyoming county line	
CR 386	3.2	5.15	CR 390	Merlau Road	US 20A in Wales	Former number.
CR 387	3.75	6.04	Wyoming county line	East Creek Road in Wales	NY 78	
CR 388	1.70	2.74	CR 389	Fish Hill Road in Wales	CR 387	
CR 389	1.60	2.57	CR 388	Fish Hill Road in Wales	CR 390	
CR 390	5.55	8.93	NY 16	Warner Hill Road in Wales	CR 387	
CR 391	3.6	5.79	CR 530	Vermont Hill Road	CR 175 in Wales	Former number; now part of CR 392.
CR 392	9.80	15.77	CR 531 in Holland	Vermont Hill Road	CR 175 in Wales	
CR 393	3.00	4.83	CR 382	Sanders Hill Road in Holland	Wyoming county line	
CR 394	2.80	4.51	CR 382	Whitney Road in Holland	Wyoming county line (continues as CR 15)	
CR 395	3.10	4.99	CR 382	East Holland Road in Holland	Wyoming county line	
CR 396	5.30	8.53	CR 397 in Colden	Partridge Road	NY 16 in Holland	
CR 397	5.50	8.85	CR 240	Hayes Hollow Road in Colden	CR 374	
CR 398	2.10	3.38	CR 397	Irish Road in Colden	CR 400	
CR 399	0.40	0.64	CR 426	South Hill Road in Concord	Colden town line	
CR 400	1.60	2.57	CR 398	Knapp Road in Colden	NY 249	

== Routes 401-500 ==
Route	Length (mi)	Length (km)	From	Via	To	Notes
CR 401	0.55	0.89	CR 371	Ward Road in Boston	CR 442	
CR 402	2.80	4.51	NY 954G	Liberia Road in Marilla	CR 355	Formerly part of NY 358
CR 403	2.55	4.10	CR 531	Miller Avenue in Sardinia	CR 404	
CR 404	1.15	1.85	NY 16	Currier–Sardinia Road in Sardinia	CR 403	
CR 405	5.45	8.77	CR 409 in Sardinia	Warner Gulf Road	CR 204 in Holland	
CR 406	3.85	6.20	CR 407	Mattheson Corner Road in Sardinia	CR 225	
CR 407	5.30	8.53	CR 410	Pratham Road in Sardinia	CR 408	
CR 408	2.73	4.39	CR 33	Crump Road in Colden	CR 240	
CR 409	9.03	14.53	NY 240 in Concord	Genesee Road	Wyoming county line in Sardinia	
CR 410	7.95	12.79	CR 228 in Concord	Middle Road	NY 39 in Sardinia	
CR 412	1.20	1.93	CR 181 / CR 413	North Street in Concord	NY 240 / CR 198	
CR 413	0.74	1.19	CR 228	Buffalo Road in Concord	Springville village line	
CR 414	0.40	0.64	CR 418	Skyview Lane in Concord	Dead end at US 219	
CR 415	7.15	11.51	NY 75 in Collins	Woodside Lane and Concord Road	CR 419 in Concord	
CR 416	1.10	1.77	CR 418	Adams Road in Concord	CR 228	
CR 417	1.50	2.41	CR 228	Townsend Road in Concord	CR 49	
CR 418	1.10	1.77	CR 416	Transit Line Road in Concord	CR 49	
CR 419	2.25	3.62	NY 39	Belscher Road in Concord	CR 415	
CR 420	9.98	16.06	CR 457 in Concord	Trevett Road	CR 227 in Boston	
CR 421	0.75	1.21	Local maintenance	Hoffman Road in Concord	NY 39	
CR 422	2.90	4.67	CR 457	Groth Road in Concord	NY 39	
CR 425	0.50	0.80	CR 49	Summit Road in Concord	Dead end at US 219	
CR 426	1.60	2.57	CR 228	Abbott Hill Road in Concord	CR 399	
CR 427	2.40	3.86	CR 228	Snyder Road in Concord	CR 228	
CR 428	1.35	2.17	CR 49	Drake Road in Concord	CR 427	
CR 429	2.60	4.18	CR 49	Moore Road in Concord	CR 420	
CR 430	2.00	3.22	CR 50	Wagner Road in Concord	CR 420	
CR 431	1.20	1.93	CR 430	Emerling Road in Concord	CR 436	
CR 432	1.50	2.41	NY 240	Sibley Road in Concord	CR 181	
CR 433	2.35	3.78	CR 181	Morse Road in Concord	NY 240	
CR 434	0.25	0.40	CR 420	Wheeler Road in Concord	CR 435	
CR 435	0.40	0.64	CR 434	Spaulding Road in Concord	CR 415	
CR 436	4.12	6.63	CR 437 / CR 469 in Concord	Brown Hill Road	CR 420 in Boston	
CR 437	5.77	9.29	CR 436 / CR 469	Zimmerman Road in Boston	NY 277 / NY 391 / CR 227	
CR 438	4.50	7.24	CR 543	Back Creek Road in Boston	CR 437	
CR 439	2.60	4.18	CR 227	Omphalus Road in Boston	CR 441	
CR 440	0.75	1.21	CR 442	Wholheiter Road in Boston	CR 441	
CR 441	4.60	7.40	CR 222 in Colden	Lower East Hill and Old Lower East Hill roads	CR 442 in Boston	
CR 442	7.04	11.33	CR 222 in Boston	Cole Road	NY 240 in Orchard Park town	
CR 443	0.51	0.82	CR 227	Boston Cross Road in Boston	CR 222	Former number; decommissioned 1995 and turned over to Boston for maintenance.
CR 444	0.39	0.63	CR 438	Patchin Road in Boston	CR 227	Former number; decommissioned 1995 and turned over to Boston for maintenance.
CR 445	4.6	7.40	CR 415 in Collins	New Oregon Road	CR 39/CR 50 in Eden	Former number; now part of CR 446.
CR 446	8.95	14.40	CR 415 in Collins	New Oregon Road	NY 75 in Eden	
CR 447	7.40	11.91	US 62	Shirley Road in North Collins	CR 446	
CR 448	7.0	11.27	CR 495 in North Collins	Genesee Road	CR 49 / CR 50 / CR 106 in Concord	Former number; now part of CR 73.
CR 449	6.45	10.38	CR 511	Brown Street in Collins	NY 39	
CR 450	0.75	1.21	CR 449	Ottenbecker Road in Collins	CR 415	
CR 451	1.05	1.69	NY 39	Brewer Road in Collins	CR 449	
CR 452	1.75	2.82	CR 454	Konert Road in Collins	NY 39	
CR 453	3.85	6.20	CR 40	Becker Road in Collins	NY 39	
CR 454	1.60	2.57	CR 452	Wilson Road in Collins	CR 453	
CR 455	0.75	1.21	CR 453	Scrabble Hill Road in Collins	CR 456	
CR 456	1.00	1.61	CR 455	Dupont Road in Collins	CR 453	
CR 457	9.95	16.01	CR 78 / CR 405 in Collins	Zoar Valley Road	NY 39 in Concord	
CR 458	0.71	1.14	CR 459	Langer Road in West Seneca	CR 137	
CR 459	1.64	2.64	Lackawanna city line	Fisher Road in West Seneca	NY 240	
CR 460	3.51	5.65	US 20 / NY 179 in Orchard Park town	Milestrip Road	CR 377 in Elma	
CR 461	1.84	2.96	US 20A	California Road in Orchard Park town	NY 179	
CR 463	1.10	1.77	NY 952J / CR 44	Duerr Road in Orchard Park town	Thorn Street	
CR 464	2.05	3.30	NY 5	Rogers Road in Hamburg town	CR 122.	Former number.
CR 465	2.25	3.62	CR 467	Versailles Road in Hamburg town	CR 133	
CR 466	1.20	1.93	US 20	Heltz Road in Hamburg town	CR 133	
CR 467	4.75	7.64	CR 127	North Creek Road in Hamburg town	CR 65	
CR 468	2.60	4.18	CR 480 in Boston	Taylor Road	CR 220 in Hamburg town	
CR 469	6.50	10.46	CR 436 / CR 437	Feddick Road in Boston	CR 480	
CR 470	0.31	0.50	CR 480	Heinrich Road in Boston	CR 472	
CR 471	0.80	1.29	CR 469	Mayer Road in Boston	CR 437	
CR 472	3.80	6.12	NY 75 in Eden	Eckhardt Road	NY 391 in Boston	
CR 473	1.65	2.66	NY 75	Hardt Road in Eden	CR 220	
CR 474	0.85	1.37	CR 475	Bley Road in Eden	US 62	
CR 475	2.25	3.62	CR 476	Bauer Road in Eden	CR 474	
CR 476	5.67	9.12	CR 127 in Evans	South Creek Road	US 62 in Eden	
CR 477	4.47	7.19	CR 9 in Angola	Mill Street and Delamater Road	CR 127 in Evans	
CR 478	1.15	1.85	NY 5	Sweetland Road in Evans	CR 127	
CR 480	1.49	2.40	CR 220 in Eden	North Boston Road	CR 470 in Boston	
CR 481	1.48	2.38	CR 220 in Eden	Zenner Road	CR 469 in Boston	
CR 482	1.50	2.41	CR 220 in Eden	Haig Road	CR 469 in Boston	
CR 483	1.50	2.41	NY 75	Schintzius Road in Eden	CR 220	
CR 485	4.5	7.24	Townline Road in North Collins	Jennings Road	US 62 in Eden	Former number; now part of CR 486.
CR 486	6.01	9.67	NY 249 in North Collins	Jennings Road	US 62 in Eden	
CR 487	7.64	12.30	CR 508 / CR 510 in Collins	Jennings Road	NY 249 in North Collins	
CR 488	2.60	4.18	US 62	East Church Street in Eden	NY 75	
CR 489	2.65	4.26	CR 477 in Angola	Gowans Road	CR 41 in Evans	
CR 490	5.10	8.21	CR 9 in Angola	Pontiac Road	US 62 in Eden	
CR 491	6.98	11.23	NY 5 in Evans	Cain Road	US 62 in North Collins	
CR 492	2.61	4.20	NY 249 in Brant	Hardpan Road	CR 9 in Evans	
CR 493	3.05	4.91	North Collins village line	School Street in North Collins	CR 486	
CR 494	0.8	1.29	NY 249/CR 495	Ketchum Road in North Collins	CR 493	Former number; now part of CR 501.
CR 495	3.1	4.99	CR 500	Ketchum Road in North Collins	NY 249/CR 495	Former number; now part of CR 501.
CR 496	0.90	1.45	CR 447 / CR 498	Angling Road in North Collins	CR 501	
CR 497	2.0	3.22	CR 73	Quaker Street	CR 447 / CR 496 in North Collins	Former number; now part of CR 498.
CR 498	5.70	9.17	NY 39 in Collins	Quaker Street	CR 447 / CR 496 in North Collins	
CR 499	0.75	1.21	CR 498	Stearns Road in North Collins	CR 501	
CR 500	4.65	7.48	US 62	Marshfield Road in North Collins	NY 75	

== Routes 501 and up ==
Route	Length (mi)	Length (km)	From	Via	To	Notes
CR 501	5.20	8.37	CR 498	Ketchum Road in North Collins	CR 493	
CR 502	0.25	0.40	CR 52	Main Street-Lawtons Road in North Collins	US 62	
CR 503	5.20	8.37	Cattaraugus county line in Gowanda	Aldrich Street and Taylor Hollow Road	US 62 in Collins	
CR 504	0.32	0.51	Cattaraugus Indian Reservation line	Four Mile Level Road in Collins	Gowanda village line	Entire length concurrent with NY 438
CR 505	1.75	2.82	US 62 / NY 39	Bagdad Road in Collins	NY 39	
CR 506	1.55	2.49	CR 74	South Quaker Road in Collins	CR 505	
CR 507	1.00	1.61	CR 74	Lone Road in Collins	CR 508	
CR 508	3.80	6.12	CR 487 / CR 510	Foster Road in Collins	CR 457 / CR 74	
CR 509	1.70	2.74	CR 74 / CR 507	Gowanda–Zoar Road in Collins	CR 457 / CR 458	Former number. Now a section of CR 74.
CR 510	3.05	4.91	US 62	West Becker Road in Collins	CR 487	
CR 511	3.20	5.15	US 62	Lenox Road in Collins	CR 487	
CR 512	0.55	0.89	CR 220	Electric Avenue in Blasdell	Lackawanna city line	
CR 519	0.35	0.56	CR 420	Fowlerville Road in Concord	CR 228	
CR 520	0.7	1.13	CR 329/CR 70	Williston Road	Wyoming County Line	Former number; now part of CR 349.
CR 521	1.97	3.17	Tonawanda city line	Creekside Drive in Tonawanda town	US 62	
CR 523	4.39	7.07	NY 277 in Cheektowaga	Como Park Boulevard	Lake Avenue in Lancaster village	
CR 524	1.60	2.57	CR 189	Two Mile Creek Road in Tonawanda town	Tonawanda city line	
CR 526	1.86	2.99	NY 5	Davison Road in Clarence	CR 163	
CR 527	2.70	4.35	NY 354 in Marilla	Cayuga Creek Road	US 20 in Alden town	Formerly known as West Alden Road.
CR 528	3.89	6.26	NY 16 / NY 78 / CR 572	West Blood Road in Elma	CR 6	
CR 529	1.50	2.41	NY 277	Gartman Road in Orchard Park town	CR 442	
CR 530	1.20	1.93	CR 392	Church Street in Holland	CR 382	
CR 531	3.44	5.54	NY 16 in Sardinia	South Protection Road	NY 16 in Holland	
CR 533	0.18	0.29	US 62	Collins Road in Collins	NY 39	Former number; decommissioned by 1988 and turned over to town of Collins for maintenance.
CR 534	1.81	2.91	Buffalo city line	Mineral Springs Road in West Seneca	CR 109	
CR 535	3.90	6.28	CR 404 in Sardinia	Phillips Road	CR 396 in Holland	
CR 537	0.40	0.64	NY 16	North Protection Road in Holland	NY 16	
CR 538	0.76	1.22	CR 199	Bergtold Road in Clarence	CR 155	
CR 539	0.48	0.77	NY 33	Holtz Drive in Cheektowaga	CR 324	
CR 541	2.70	4.35	CR 551 in Colden	Boies Road	CR 67 in Aurora	
CR 542	1.03	1.66	CR 524	Ensimger Road in Tonawanda town	NY 265	
CR 543	0.95	1.53	US 219	Pfarner Road in Concord		
CR 546	4.00	6.44	Cattaraugus Indian Reservation line	Mile Block Road in Brant	CR 491	
CR 547	3.80	6.12	NY 354 / NY 954G in Marilla	Two Rod Road	CR 343 in Alden town	
CR 548	3.72	5.99	West River Road	Love Road in Grand Island	CR 11	
CR 550	0.22	0.35	CR 189	Kenmore Avenue in Tonawanda town	NY 265	
CR 551	1.70	2.74	CR 541	Darien Road in Colden	CR 380	
CR 552	2.21	3.56	CR 227 in Boston	Chestnut Ridge Road	NY 277 in Orchard Park town	
CR 553	1.09	1.75	CR 368	Transit Road Extension in Aurora	US 20A / NY 187	
CR 554	1.09	1.75	CR 324	Youngs Road in Amherst	NY 5	
CR 555	0.20	0.32	NY 16	Dutchtown Road in Sardinia	CR 531	
CR 556	0.10	0.16	Cattaraugus county line	Hake Road in Sardinia	NY 39	
CR 557	0.65	1.05	Williamsville village line	Mill Street in Amherst	NY 324	
CR 559	5.88	9.46	NY 78	Tonawanda Creek Road in Clarence	CR 43 / CR 560	Formerly part of NY 268
CR 560	6.81	10.96	NY 5	Salt Road in Clarence	CR 43 / CR 559	Formerly part of NY 268
CR 562	1.55	2.49	NY 240 / CR 222	Heath Road in Colden	CR 397	
CR 563	1.75	2.82	NY 240 / CR 30 in Concord	Foote Road	CR 407 in Sardinia	
CR 571	3.73	6.00	CR 215	Center Street in Colden	CR 154 / CR 215	Entire length concurrent with NY 16
CR 572	0.60	0.97	US 20A	Buffalo Road in East Aurora village	East Aurora village line	Entire length concurrent with NY 16 / NY 78
CR 573	2.35	3.78	NY 93 in Akron	John Street and Bloomingdale Road	Genesee county line	Formerly NY 267
CR 574	5.48	8.82	NY 16 / NY 78 / CR 572 in Elma	Jamison Road	NY 954G in Marilla	Formerly NY 422
CR 575	0.79	1.27	CR 576	Bayview Road in Hamburg town	US 62	
CR 576	1.24	2.00	NY 5	Big Tree Road in Hamburg town	CR 575	
CR 577	1.32	2.12	CR 11	Bush Road in Grand Island	West River Road	
CR 578	1.32	2.12	NY 354 in Marilla	Exchange Street	US 20 in Alden village	Formerly NY 239
CR 580	1.84	2.96	Tonawanda city line	Ellicott Creek Road in Tonawanda town	US 62	Formerly NY 356
CR 581	1.97	3.17	Cattaraugus County line in Concord	Cascade Road	CR 121 in Springville	Formerly US 219

== See also ==
- County routes in New York
