= New York State Route 324 =

State highway in western New York, US

New York State Route 324
- Map of the Buffalo–Niagara Falls area with NY 324 highlighted in red, and NY 325 in blue

Route information
- Maintained by NYSDOT, NYSTA, and Erie County
- Length: 22.51 mi (36.23 km)
- Existed: c. 1933–present

Major junctions
- West end: I-190 / NY 384 / Niagara Scenic Parkway in Niagara Falls
- I-190 on Grand Island; NY 265 in Tonawanda US 62 in Tonawanda I-290 in Amherst; NY 78 in Amherst / Clarence
- East end: NY 5 in Clarence

Location
- Country: United States
- State: New York
- Counties: Niagara, Erie

Highway system
- New York Highways; Interstate; US; State; Reference; Parkways
← NY 323	NY 325	→ NY 326

New York State Route 324 (NY 324) is an east–west state highway located in the western portion of New York in the United States. Officially, NY 324 begins at NY 384 in Niagara Falls and overlaps Interstate 190 (I-190, the Niagara Section of the New York State Thruway) south to Grand Island, where it separates from I-190 and continues southward as Grand Island Boulevard. As signed, however, NY 324 begins at the southern end of the official overlap and is contained entirely within Erie County. At the southern edge of Grand Island, NY 324 joins I-190 to cross over to the mainland, where it runs due east across three towns before reaching its eastern end at a junction with NY 5 in the town of Clarence.

NY 324 is known by two names along its routing: Grand Island Boulevard on Grand Island and Sheridan Drive in the northern suburbs of Buffalo. As the latter, the route serves as a major commercial strip for Tonawanda, Amherst, and Clarence. NY 324, assigned c. 1933, is one of two routes to occupy part of Sheridan Drive; the other is New York State Route 325, which follows the westernmost 1.42 miles (2.29 km) of the street. NY 324 once extended northwest to downtown Niagara Falls; however, it was truncated to its current western terminus on January 1, 1962.

== Route description ==
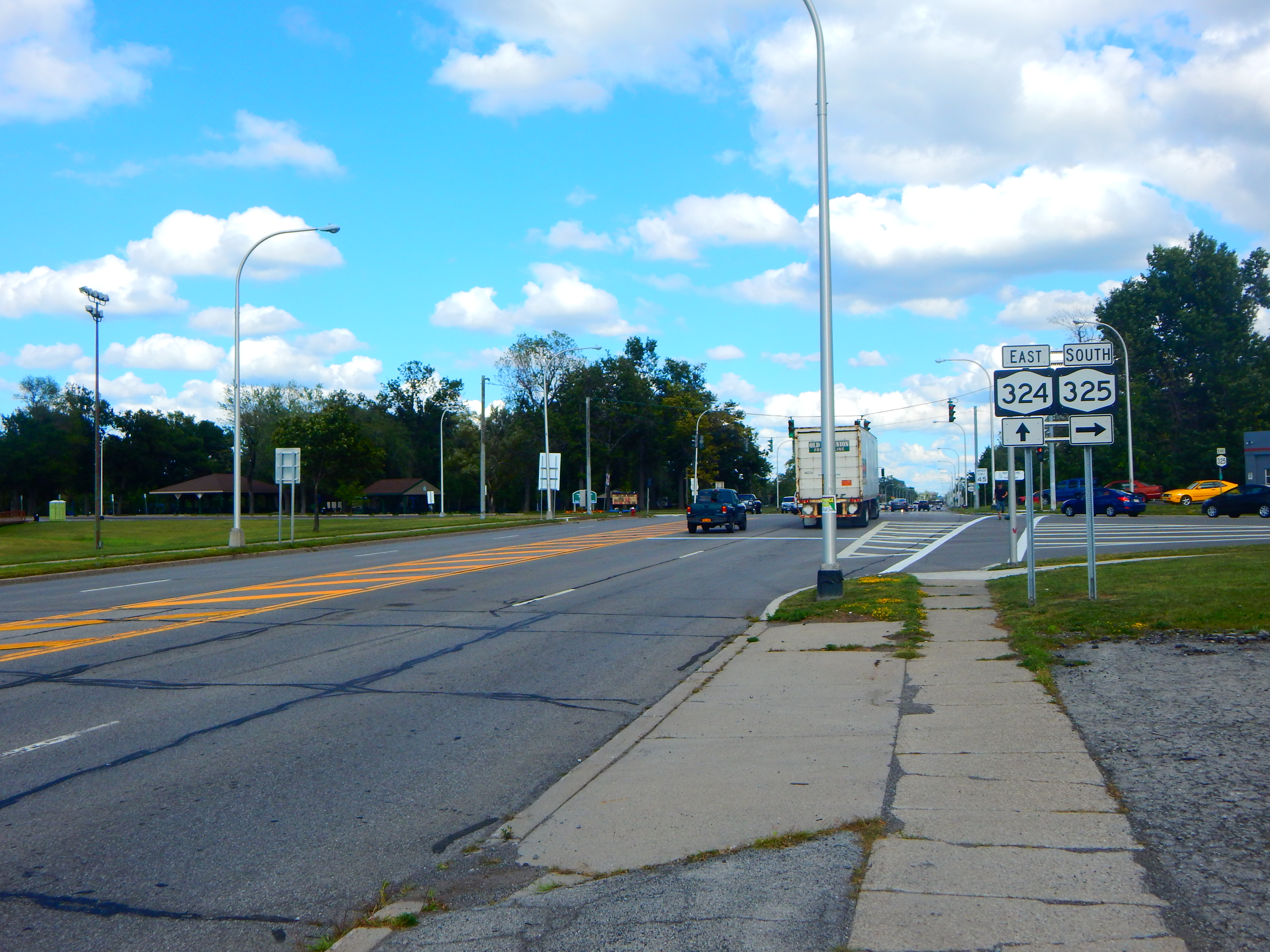
NY 324 eastbound approaching the junction with NY 325 in the Town of Tonawanda

According to the New York State Department of Transportation (NYSDOT), NY 324 begins at NY 384 in eastern Niagara Falls. NY 324 heads south, overlapping with I-190 (the Niagara Section of the New York State Thruway) across the North Grand Island Bridge to Grand Island, where it leaves the expressway at exit 20. However, as signed, NY 324 begins at the north end of Grand Island, where it splits off from the Interstate Highway as Grand Island Boulevard. South of exit 20, the official and signed routings are identical.

Maintenance of the route is split between NYSDOT, the New York State Thruway Authority (NYSTA), and Erie County. All but the northernmost 0.02 miles (0.03 km) of the portion of the route that overlaps with I-190 is maintained by NYSTA. The two county-maintained sections extend from exit 20B to Grand Island Boulevard on Grand Island and from exit 15 to Grand Island Boulevard in Town of Tonawanda, where NY 324 utilizes small portions of the county-owned Long Road and Kenmore Avenue, respectively. The remainder of NY 324 is maintained by NYSDOT.

From I-190 exit 20, NY 324 runs in a more southeasterly direction, serving as the main commercial strip on Grand Island, before it overlaps I-190 in order to cross the Niagara River. Once on the mainland, the structure of exits on I-190 allows only the westbound portion of NY 325 to use Grand Island Boulevard west of I-190's exit 15, following Grand Island Boulevard past the exit to an intersection with NY 266, then turning right to follow it to exit 17 to merge with I-190. The eastbound route of NY 324 is unable to do so; instead, it parts company with the Interstate Highway on the other side of the river at exit 15, where it turns north to parallel I-190 on Kenmore Avenue. The eastbound portion of Grand Island Boulevard on this stretch is maintained as reference route 950C. After 250 yards (229 m), it veers east onto the Town of Tonawanda's portion of Grand Island Boulevard for 0.5 miles (0.8 km) to a junction with Sheridan Drive. The latter carries NY 325, a 1.42-mile (2.29 km) route that begins at NY 266 on the banks of the Niagara and passes through a commercial and industrial area of the Town of Tonawanda. NY 324 takes on the Sheridan Drive name here and assumes a more due easterly course across northern Erie County. Though the street is signed as a state highway on both NY 324 and NY 325, most residents simply refer to this road by its local name.

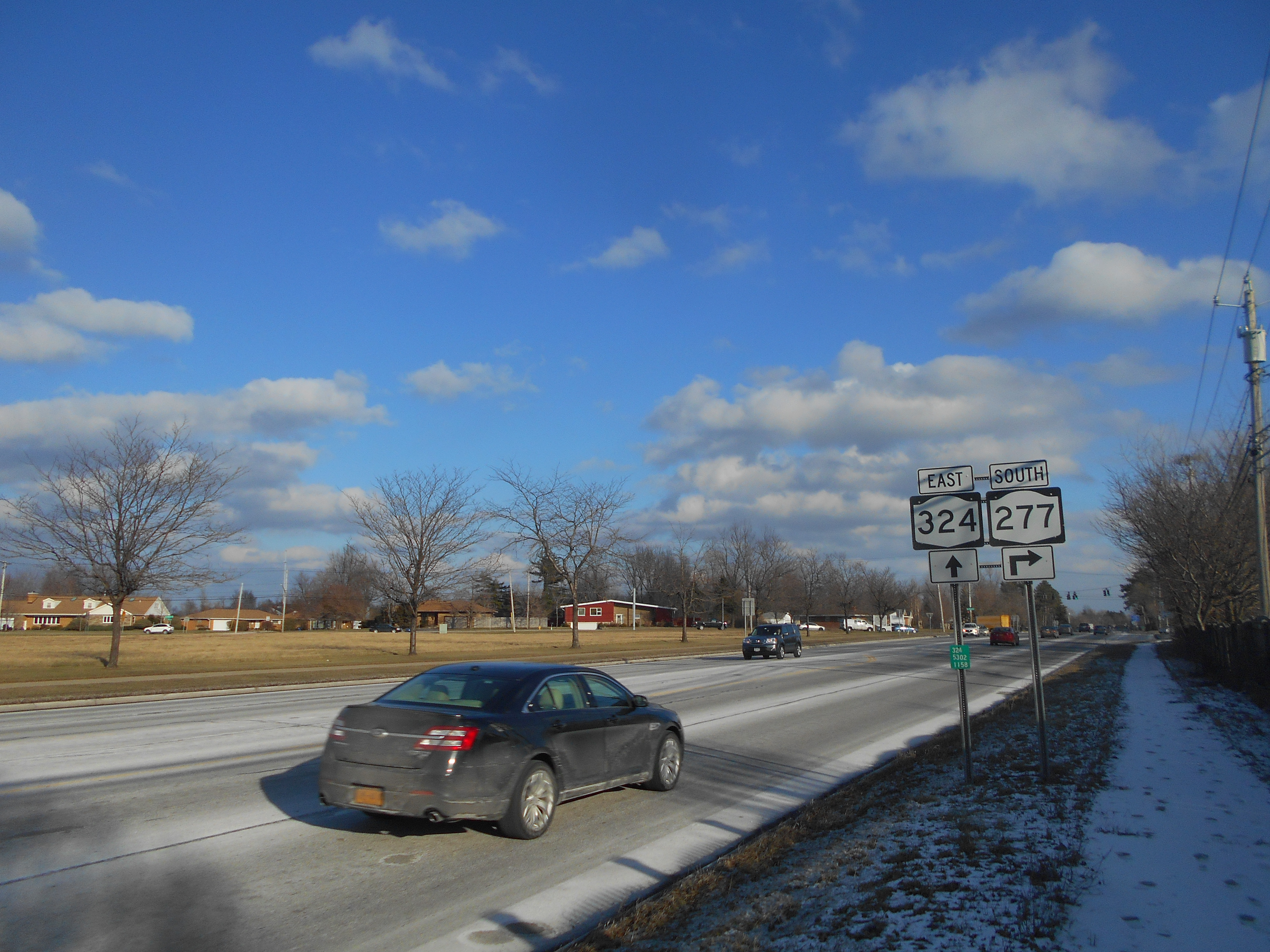
NY 324 approaching NY 277 in Amherst

Through much of this portion, the road is divided, with a tree-lined median strip. Businesses, both local and national, line both sides of the road and traffic is heavy. It crosses some other major strips such as Niagara Falls Boulevard (U.S. Route 62 or US 62), a major contributor to traffic on Sheridan due to the proximity of the Boulevard Mall, and Millersport Highway (NY 263), which feeds the Amherst campus of the University at Buffalo. In Amherst it meets the Youngmann Expressway (I-290) where NY 240 (Harlem Road), reaches its northern end. Past the Youngmann development abates, green returns to the roadside and the median ends, although the road remains four-lane and high-volume. There is another pocket of development around the Wegmans supermarket north of Williamsville, which has seen some rapid growth in the last few years.

NY 324 crosses its last major route, Transit Road (NY 78), on an overpass just north of the once-thriving Eastern Hills Mall, which had been the premier mall in the Buffalo area until it began losing tenants and customers to the larger Walden Galleria in Cheektowaga. Beyond Transit, the road is still four-lane but primarily residential as it enters the Town of Clarence. After Harris Hill Road, the highway bends to the southeast once again for a final mile into its eastern end at Main Street (NY 5). This last section was widened from two lanes to four in the mid-1990s, and has seen some development but still remains lightly trafficked most of the day.

== History ==
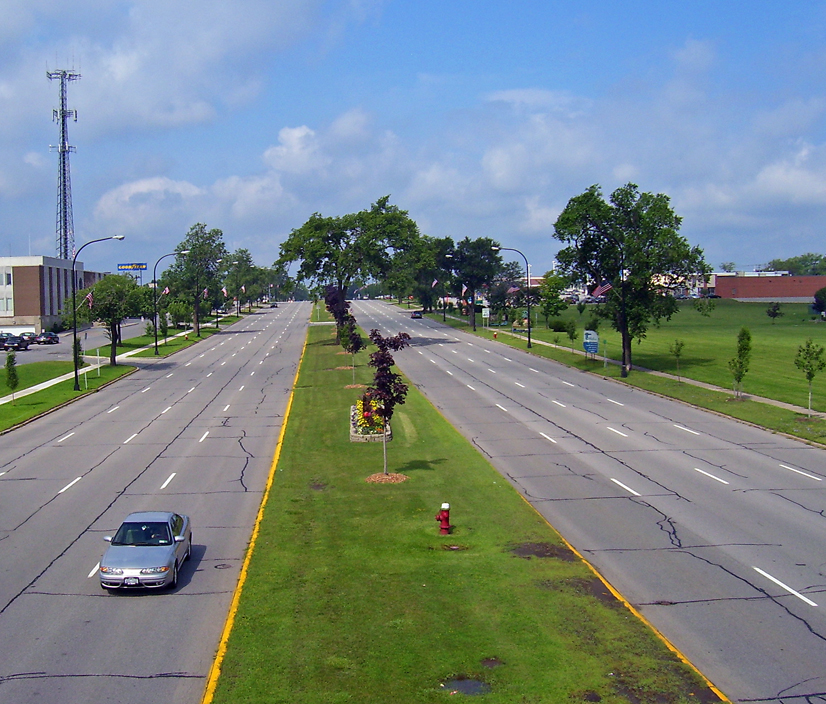
Sheridan Drive in the town of Tonawanda

Sheridan Drive was constructed during the early 1920s as a town of Tonawanda project to help alleviate the anticipated growth of the village of Kenmore. Despite its construction, the new road was not without controversy. During construction, new traffic lights were put in with concrete supports were opposed heavily by the town of Tonawanda and its residents, resulting in the traffic lights not having been built for many years. The town also felt that the construction of a superhighway in the middle of the country in Tonawanda was unjustified with the average traffic in that area. After construction of Sheridan Drive was completed in 1925, a monument with a statue of General Phillip Sheridan was constructed to commemorate the new road. However, the taxpayers feeling enough money had already been spent on the road, the statue of Sheridan was never constructed and only the monument to the road's construction was completed. In order to give the road a new look, the road had large trees planted throughout what was considered a desolate area at the time.

Due to an archaic law in Erie County, the town of Tonawanda and the town of Amherst, who completed the road in 1925, were requested in 1935 to take over $2 million (1935 USD) in debts bonded for its construction. The county noted that the towns' inability to pay for the road made the new road a financial burden for the county. To make things worse, the new road did not bring the immediate influx of business that was advertised and was looking early on as a giant mistake on the part of the county and towns.

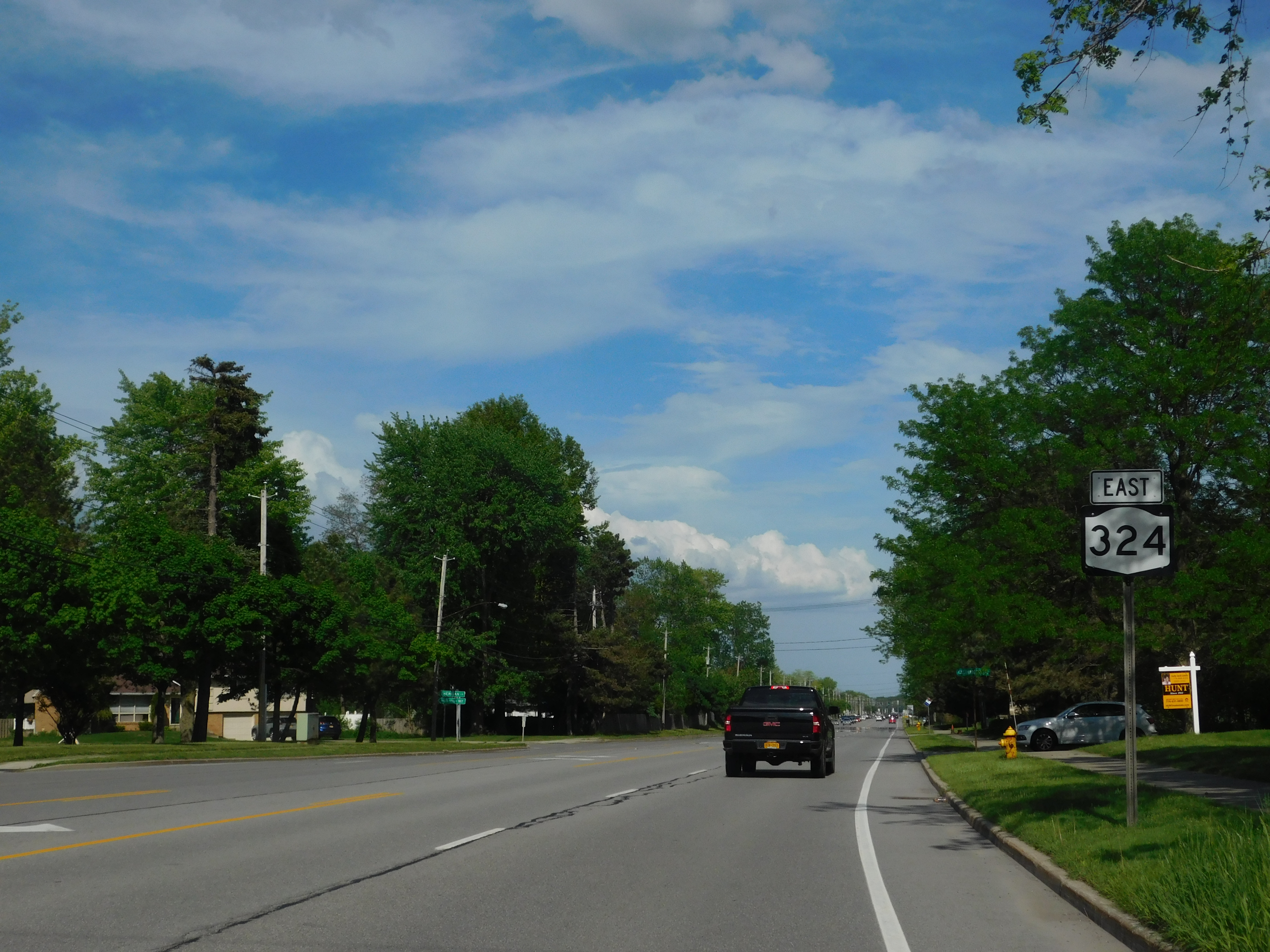
NY 324 eastbound in Amherst

When NY 324 was assigned c. 1933, it began at NY 384 (River Road; now NY 266) in the town of Tonawanda and followed Sheridan Drive eastward to NY 5 in the town of Clarence. By 1935, what is now NY 324 between Niagara Falls and Tonawanda via Grand Island was designated as NY 325. NY 324 was extended northward to NY 384 in Niagara Falls c. 1937, supplanting the entirety of NY 325. The NY 325 designation was reassigned to the short piece of Sheridan Drive not designated as NY 324. The route was extended one final time by 1948 to follow NY 384 westward from the North Grand Island Bridge into downtown Niagara Falls.

NY 324 remained unchanged until January 1, 1962, when the overlap with NY 384 was removed. Although the overlap with the new I-190 on the North Grand Island Bridge was also removed from maps during the same period, and is no longer signed, this overlap was never officially removed from either NYSDOT's description of the route or the annual NYSDOT Traffic Data Report.

== Major intersections ==
County	Location	mi	km	Destinations	Notes
Niagara	Niagara Falls	0.00	0.00	I-190 north – Lewiston	Western terminus; exit 21 (I-190); northern terminus of I-190 / NY 324 overlap
Niagara	Niagara Falls	0.00	0.00	NY 384 / Niagara Scenic Parkway north – Niagara Falls State Park, American Falls, Rainbow Bridge, Canada, Seneca Niagara Casino	
Erie	Grand Island	1.57	2.53	I-190 south – Buffalo	Exit 20B (I-190); southern terminus of I-190 / NY 324 overlap
Erie	Grand Island	6.17	9.93	I-190 north – Niagara Falls	Exit 18 (I-190); northern terminus of I-190 / NY 324 overlap
Erie	Town of Tonawanda	7.42	11.94	NY 266 (River Road) – Tonawandas, Buffalo	Exit 17 (I-190)
Erie	Town of Tonawanda	8.02	12.91	I-290 east (Youngmann Expressway) to I-90 / New York Thruway – Tonawanda, Rochester	Exit 16 (I-190); western terminus of I-290
Erie	Town of Tonawanda	8.25	13.28	I-190 south – Buffalo	Exit 15 (I-190); southern terminus of I-190 / NY 324 overlap (eastbound)
Erie	Town of Tonawanda	9.05	14.56	I-190 north / I-290 east	Exit 15 (I-190); southern terminus of I-190 / NY 324 overlap (westbound)
Erie	Town of Tonawanda	9.56	15.39	NY 325 south (Sheridan Drive)	Northern terminus of NY 325
Erie	Town of Tonawanda	9.95	16.01	NY 265 (Military Road)	
Erie	Town of Tonawanda	10.78	17.35	NY 384 (Delaware Avenue)	
Erie	Tonawanda–Amherst town line	13.11	21.10	US 62 north (Niagara Falls Boulevard) / NY 950K south (Niagara Falls Boulevard)	Western terminus of US 62 / NY 324 overlap; northern terminus of unsigned NY 950K
Erie	Amherst	13.56	21.82	US 62 south (Bailey Avenue)	Eastern terminus of US 62 / NY 324 overlap
Erie	Amherst	14.32	23.05	NY 263 (Millersport Highway)	
Erie	Amherst	15.09	24.29	NY 240 south (Harlem Road)	Northern terminus of NY 240
Erie	Amherst	15.13	24.35	I-290 (Youngmann Expressway)	Exit 6 (I-290)
Erie	Amherst	15.90	25.59	NY 277 south (Union Road)	Northern terminus of NY 277
Erie	Amherst–Clarence town line	19.50	31.38	NY 78 (Transit Road) to I-90 / New York Thruway	
Erie	Clarence	22.51	36.23	NY 5 (Main Street)	Eastern terminus
1.000 mi = 1.609 km; 1.000 km = 0.621 mi: Concurrency terminus

== Bibliography ==
- Percy, John W. (1997). Images of America: The Town of Tonawanda. Arcadia Publishing. ISBN 9780738587172.
