= New York State Route 425 =

State highway in western New York, US

New York State Route 425
- Map of western New York with NY 425 highlighted in red

Route information
- Maintained by NYSDOT and the city of North Tonawanda
- Length: 23.85 mi (38.38 km)
- Existed: 1930–present

Major junctions
- South end: I-290 in Tonawanda
- US 62 in North Tonawanda
- North end: NY 18 in Wilson

Location
- Country: United States
- State: New York
- Counties: Erie, Niagara

Highway system
- New York Highways; Interstate; US; State; Reference; Parkways
← NY 424	→ NY 426

New York State Route 425 (NY 425) is a north–south state highway in the western portion of New York in the United States. It extends for 23.85 miles (38.38 km) from an interchange with Interstate 290 (I-290) in the town of Tonawanda to an intersection with NY 18 on the shore of Lake Ontario in the village of Wilson. As it heads north, it connects to several regionally important routes, including U.S. Route 62 (US 62) and NY 104. The section between I-290 and the city of North Tonawanda is a four-lane arterial known as the Twin Cities Memorial Highway. North of the city, the route is primarily a two-lane rural highway.

The portion of modern NY 425 between US 62 and Cambria–Wilson Road was originally designated as part of NY 3 in 1924. In the 1930 renumbering of state highways in New York, NY 3 was realigned to follow Saunders Settlement Road (NY 31) west to Niagara Falls. Its former routing to North Tonawanda became the basis for the new NY 425, which continued north to its current terminus in Wilson. NY 425 was extended south into North Tonawanda by 1947 and over the Twin Cities Memorial Highway to I-290 in the 1970s.

== Route description ==
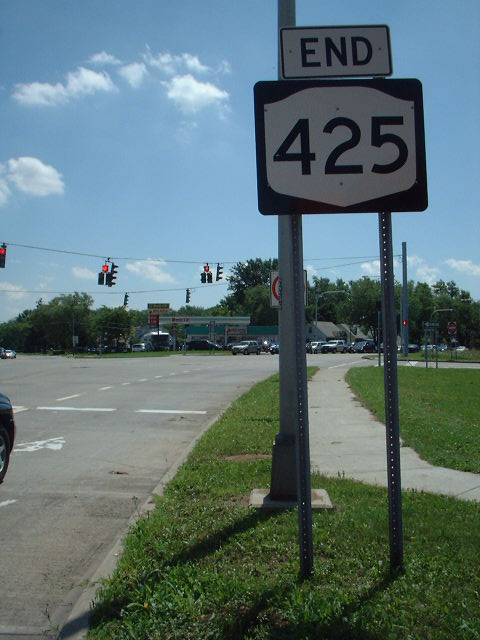
Southern terminus of NY 425 at I-290, CR 118 (Colvin Boulevard) and CR 130 (Eggert Road) in Tonawanda

NY 425 has two distinct sections, the Twin Cities Memorial Highway section in the Tonawandas, short but heavily trafficked; and the more lightly-used two-lane stretch in central and northern Niagara County. Niagara Falls Boulevard (US 62) loosely serves as a divider between the two sections. Most of the route is maintained by the New York State Department of Transportation (NYSDOT); however, one segment in the city of North Tonawanda—from the north end of the Twin Cities Memorial Highway to the northern city line—is locally maintained.

=== Tonawandas ===
The route begins in the town of Tonawanda where the two-lane Colvin Boulevard crosses the Youngmann Expressway (I-290). At this point, Colvin Boulevard becomes a four-lane divided highway as it carries NY 425 through the interchange. Colvin Boulevard forks from NY 425 just north of the junction, giving way to the Twin Cities Memorial Highway. The route heads northwest from Colvin Boulevard and into the east half of the city of Tonawanda, serving as the divider between a commercial area to the west and residential neighborhoods to the east. This ends near Ellicott Creek, where NY 425 takes on a more northerly alignment and it connects to Ellicott Creek Road (former NY 356) by way of an interchange. The highway subsequently crosses the creek to reach a strip of land bordered by Ellicott Creek to the south and Tonawanda Creek (here part of the Erie Canal) to the north and west.

While on the peninsula, NY 425 serves predominantly commercial and industrial areas built up alongside the Twin Cities Highway. It encounters two roads here: Fillmore Avenue at an at-grade intersection and East Niagara Street at a partial, northbound only interchange on the southern edge of Tonawanda Creek. The latter junction precedes an overpass over Tonawanda Creek, which brings NY 425 into Niagara County and the adjacent city of North Tonawanda. Here, NY 425 passes through residential areas more densely developed than those in Tonawanda to the south. All junctions along the Twin Cities Highway in North Tonawanda are signalized at-grade intersections, with the parallel Division Street serving as a collector/distributor road for NY 425 northbound.

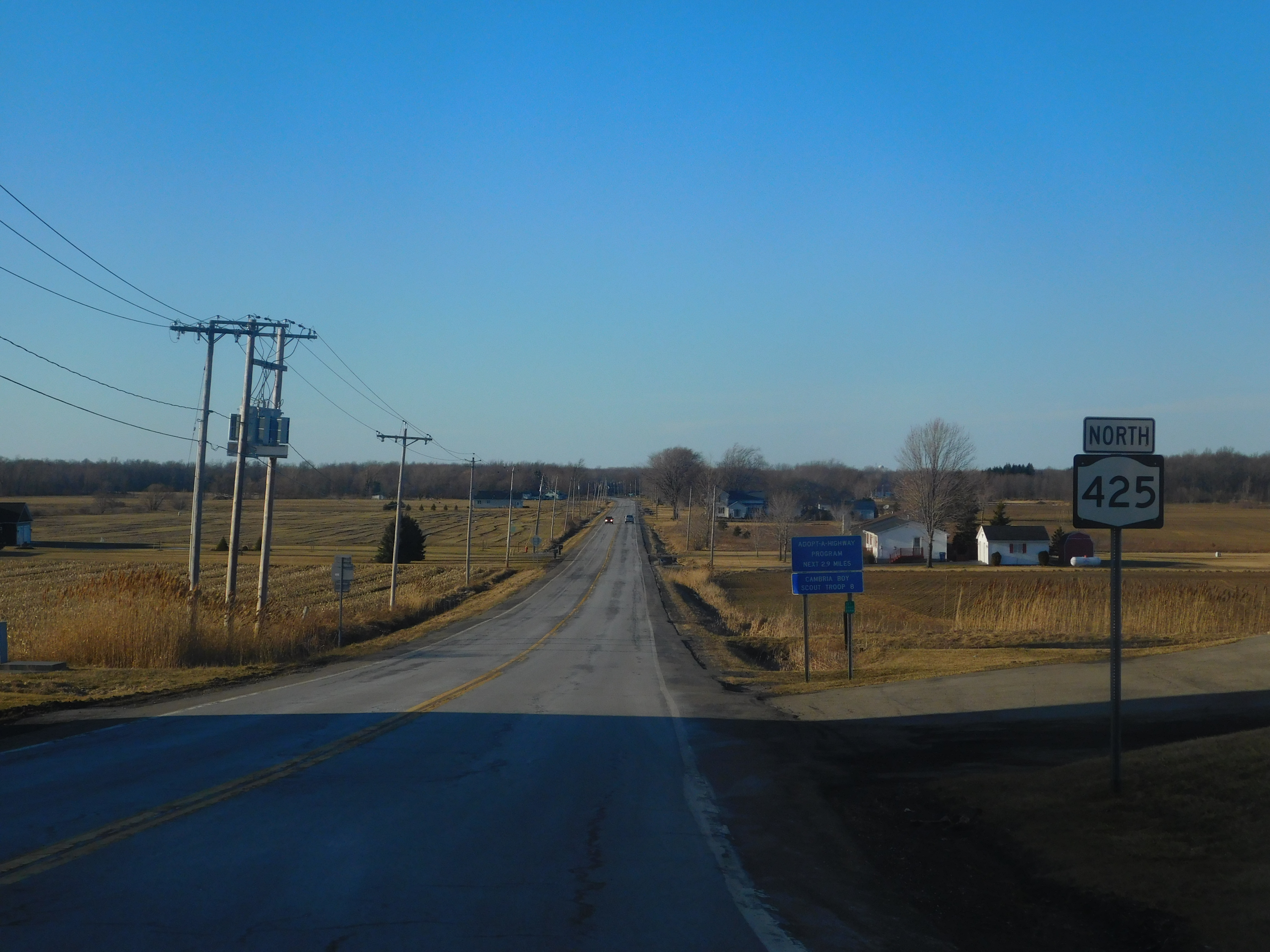
NY 425 northbound in Cambria Center

The Twin Cities Memorial Highway ends in the northern part of the city at a junction with Wheatfield Street and Erie Avenue. Wheatfield Street heads west from the intersection, eventually connecting to NY 429, while NY 425 forks to the northeast onto the two-lane Erie Avenue. The Twin Cities Highway, meanwhile, gives way to Nash Road, a highway leading north from the junction into the town of Wheatfield. The Erie Avenue section of NY 425 runs parallel to a CSX Transportation branch line and passes by dense commercial and residential areas until its junction with Niagara Falls Boulevard (US 62) near the northern city line. North of US 62, NY 425 changes names to Shawnee Road as it enters Wheatfield.

=== Cambria and Wilson ===
As Shawnee Road, NY 425 returns to a northerly course as it progresses through the town. The development that lined NY 425 in North Tonawanda initially continues into Wheatfield, a product of urban sprawl, but it becomes less dense and eventually dissipates as the road heads away from the city. NY 425 continues through the open fields of central Niagara County to the hamlet that gives NY 425 its road name before intersecting NY 31 just north of Shawnee in the town of Cambria. Immediately north of the junction is CSX's Lockport Subdivision, which NY 425 crosses on its way north to the edge of the Niagara Escarpment where that Shawnee Road ends at Upper Mountain Road and runs west for a brief 400 feet before NY 425 turns north on Shawnee Road. It subsequently descends the formation and intersects Lower Mountain Road, which serves as the north end of Shawnee Road. NY 425 briefly follows the east–west Lower Mountain Road to reach Cambria–Wilson Road.

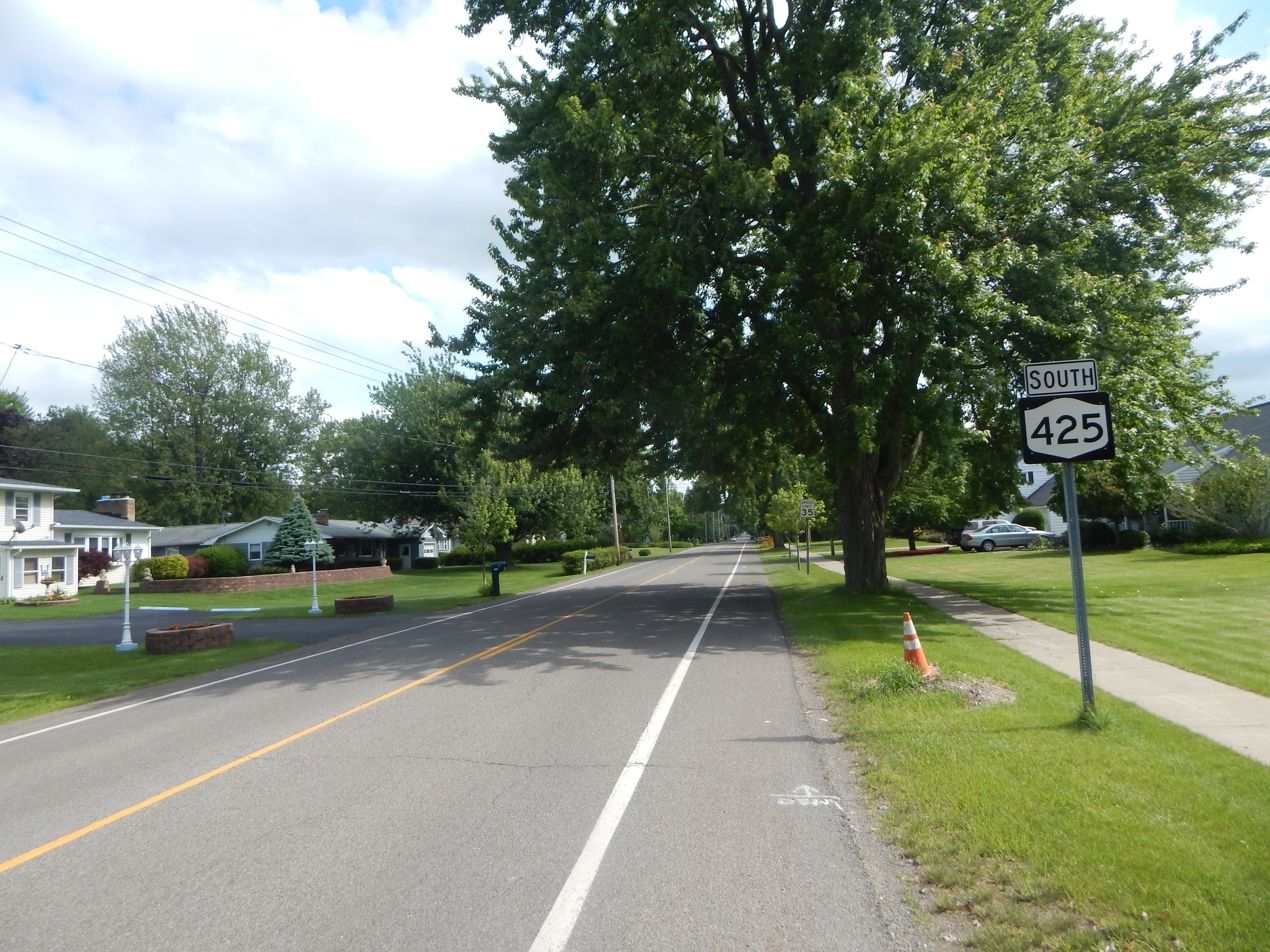
NY 425 southbound in Wilson, leaving NY 18

NY 425 heads away from Lower Mountain Road, following a due north track that the route retains until its north end. The road crosses both NY 104 (Ridge Road) and NY 93 in close succession in a lightly developed residential area near the western end of their concurrency. The rural surroundings return north of NY 93 and follow NY 425 into the town of Wilson, the last on NY 425's routing. A few miles beyond NY 93, it finally reaches the village of Wilson, located on the southern shore of Lake Ontario. NY 425 becomes Lake Street and serves as the main north–south route through the densely populated community. It continues north to the Lake Ontario shoreline, where it ends at a junction with NY 18 (Ontario Street).

== History ==
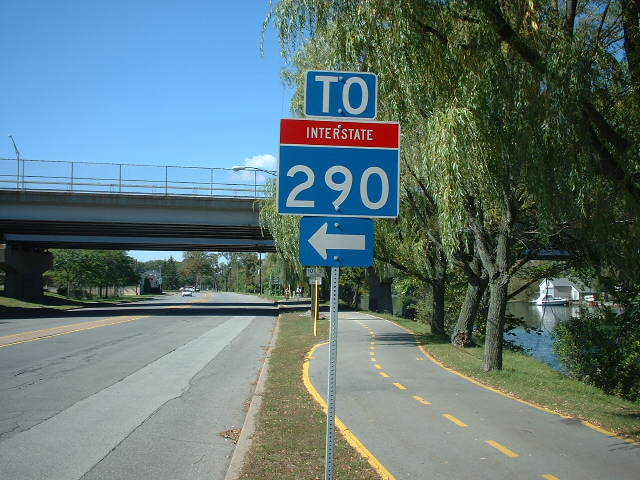
Misshaped I-290 shields in Tonawanda along East Niagara Street at NY 425

The portion of modern NY 425 between US 62 in North Tonawanda and the intersection of Cambria–Wilson Road and Lower Mountain Road in Cambria was designated as part of Route 20, an unsigned legislative route, by the New York State Legislature on March 1, 1921. When the first set of posted routes in New York were assigned in 1924, all of legislative Route 20 west of Rochester became part of NY 3, a cross-state route that began in North Tonawanda and ended in Plattsburgh. In the 1930 renumbering of state highways in New York, NY 3 was realigned to follow what is now NY 31 to Niagara Falls. The former routing of NY 3 between North Tonawanda and Cambria became part of NY 425, a new route that continued north to NY 18 in Wilson by way of Cambria–Wilson Road and an overlap with NY 3.

Initially, NY 425 overlapped NY 93 between North Ridge and Lower Mountain Roads. NY 3 was realigned in the towns of Cambria and Lockport c. 1932 to follow Saunders Settlement Road (now NY 31) between NY 425 and the city of Lockport. Its former routing to the north became NY 3A even though the entirety of the alignment was already part of either NY 425 or NY 93. The NY 3A designation was eliminated c. 1935 when NY 3 was truncated eastward to a new western terminus in central New York. The overlap with NY 93 was eliminated in the early 1940s after that route was realigned onto North Ridge Road, US 104, and Junction Road between NY 425 and Upper Mountain Road. NY 425 was extended southward into North Tonawanda by 1947, following Erie Avenue and Wheatfield Street to a new terminus at NY 429 (Oliver Street) in downtown.

In the mid-1960s, construction began on a new divided highway connecting NY 425 in North Tonawanda to I-290 south of the city of Tonawanda. The highway, known as the Twin Cities Memorial Highway, was initially designated as NY 950H, an unsigned reference route, upon opening in the 1970s. It became part of a rerouted NY 425 on July 1, 1977. When first built, the Twin Cities Memorial Highway was planned to continue north through North Tonawanda and Wheatfield to connect with the LaSalle Expressway in Niagara Falls via the Belt Expressway. Although the connection was never built, evidence of the initial plans are visible at the respective termini of each highway.

== Major intersections ==
County	Location	mi	km	Destinations	Notes
Erie	Town of Tonawanda	0.00	0.00	I-290	Southern terminus; exit 2 (I-290)
Erie	City of Tonawanda	1.10	1.77	Ellicott Creek Road / Young Street	Interchange; former routing of NY 356
Erie	City of Tonawanda			East Niagara Street	Interchange; northbound exit and southbound entrance
Niagara	North Tonawanda	4.80	7.72	US 62	
Niagara	Cambria	10.72	17.25	NY 31 – Niagara Falls, Lockport	Hamlet of Cambria Station
Niagara	Cambria	15.87	25.54	NY 104	Hamlet of Streeters Corners
Niagara	Cambria	16.58	26.68	NY 93 – Ransomville, Lockport	Hamlet of North Ridge
Niagara	Village of Wilson	23.85	38.38	NY 18 – Youngstown, Rochester	Northern terminus
1.000 mi = 1.609 km; 1.000 km = 0.621 mi: Incomplete access
