= New York State Route 93 =

State highway in western New York, US

New York State Route 93
- Map of western New York with NY 93 highlighted in red

Route information
- Maintained by NYSDOT
- Length: 43.08 mi (69.33 km)
- Existed: 1930–present

Major junctions
- West end: NY 18F in Youngstown
- Niagara Scenic Parkway in Youngstown; NY 78 in Lockport
- East end: NY 5 in Newstead

Location
- Country: United States
- State: New York
- Counties: Niagara, Erie

Highway system
- New York Highways; Interstate; US; State; Reference; Parkways
← NY 92	→ NY 94

New York State Route 93 (NY 93) is a 43.08-mile (69.33 km) state highway in western New York in the United States. The route begins at an intersection with NY 18F in the village of Youngstown and runs in a general northwest–southeast direction across Niagara and Erie counties to its east end at an intersection with NY 5 in the town of Newstead, just south of the village of Akron. NY 93 serves as a connector between several major arterials, including NY 104 in Cambria, NY 31 just west of the city of Lockport, and NY 78 south of the city.

The route was assigned as part of the 1930 renumbering of state highways in New York. Although it began in Youngstown and ended in Newstead as it does today, the initial routing of NY 93 deviated from the modern path in the vicinity of the city of Lockport. From Cambria to Lockport's eastern suburbs, the highway originally used NY 425, Lower Mountain Road, Akron Road, and a series of streets in Lockport. NY 93 was moved onto NY 104 and Junction Road in Cambria in the 1940s, and altered to bypass Lockport to the south on a new highway and Robinson and Dysinger roads in 1991. In 2006, NY 93 was realigned west of Lockport to continue south on Junction Road to NY 31. The change removed NY 93 from Upper Mountain Road, a county-owned highway that had been part of the route since the 1930s.

== Route description ==
=== West of Lockport ===
NY 93 begins at an intersection with NY 18F (Main Street; co-designated but not signed as County Route 907 or CR 907) in the center of the village of Youngstown. The route proceeds eastward through the village as a two-lane road named Lockport Street, serving two blocks of commercial areas before bending to the northeast and passing into the residential eastern portion of Youngstown. At the eastern village limits, NY 93 briefly widens to four lanes as it enters a partial cloverleaf interchange with the Niagara Scenic Parkway. Past the junction, the highway reverts to a two-lane road and changes names to Youngstown–Lockport Road as it runs across the town of Porter. The residential surroundings continue to the hamlet of Towers Corners, where NY 93 connects to NY 18 (Creek Road).

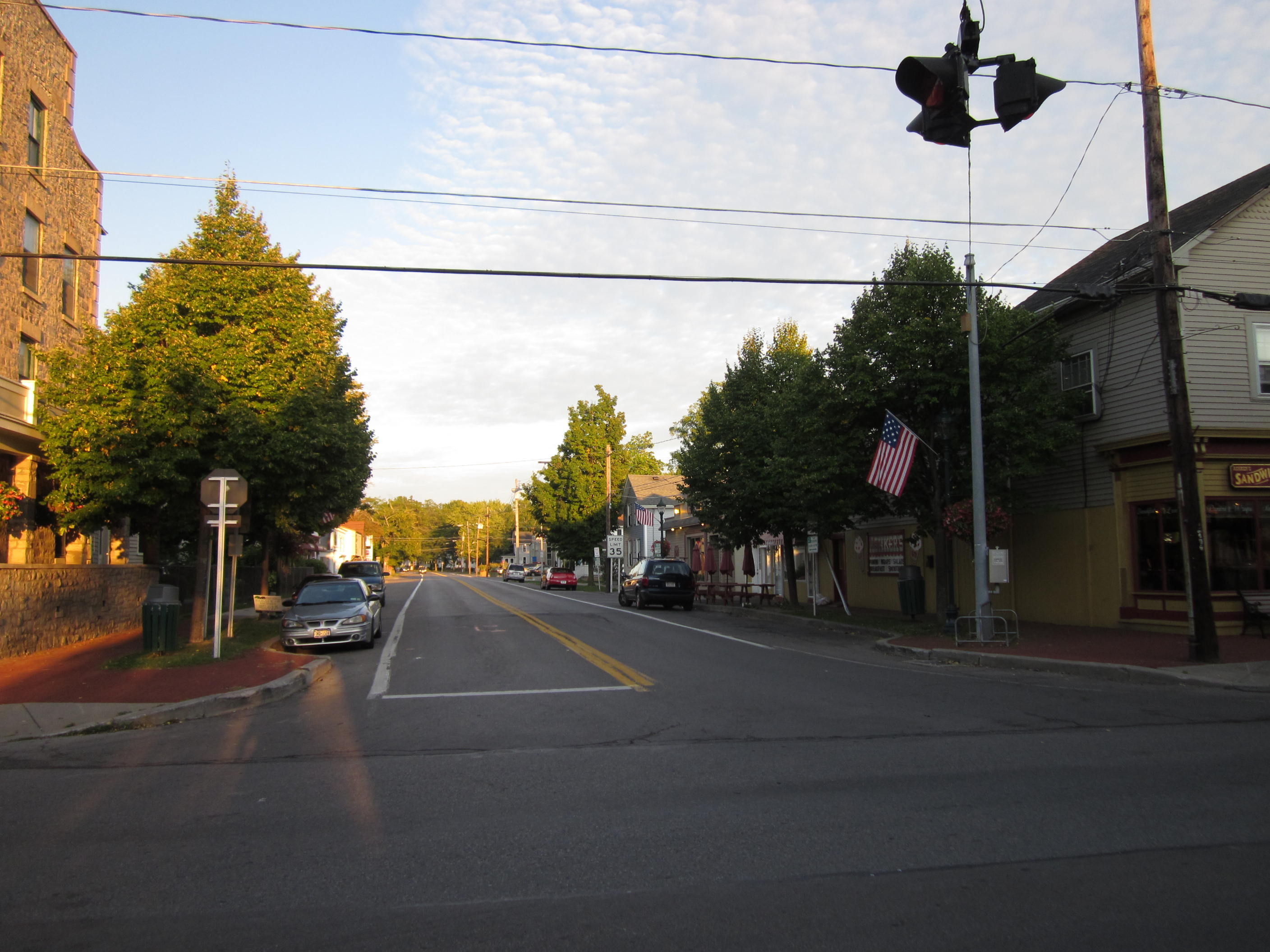
NY 93 leaving NY 18F at a blinker in Youngstown

After NY 18, NY 93 curves to the southeast, serving another residential stretch ahead of a junction with Youngstown–Wilson Road (CR 36) on the eastern edge of Towers Corners. After this intersection, the homes give way to farms as the road heads into rural areas of the town. The route continues on a southeast track through Porter, passing a mixture of rural and residential areas on its way into the hamlet of Porter Center, where NY 93 enters an intersection with Porter Center Road (CR 57). Another southeastward stretch brings the route across Twelvemile Creek and into the hamlet of Ransomville, where NY 93 becomes the community's main street. Through Ransomville, NY 93 retains the Youngstown–Lockport Road name, intersecting with Ransomville Road (CR 17) in the hamlet's business district.

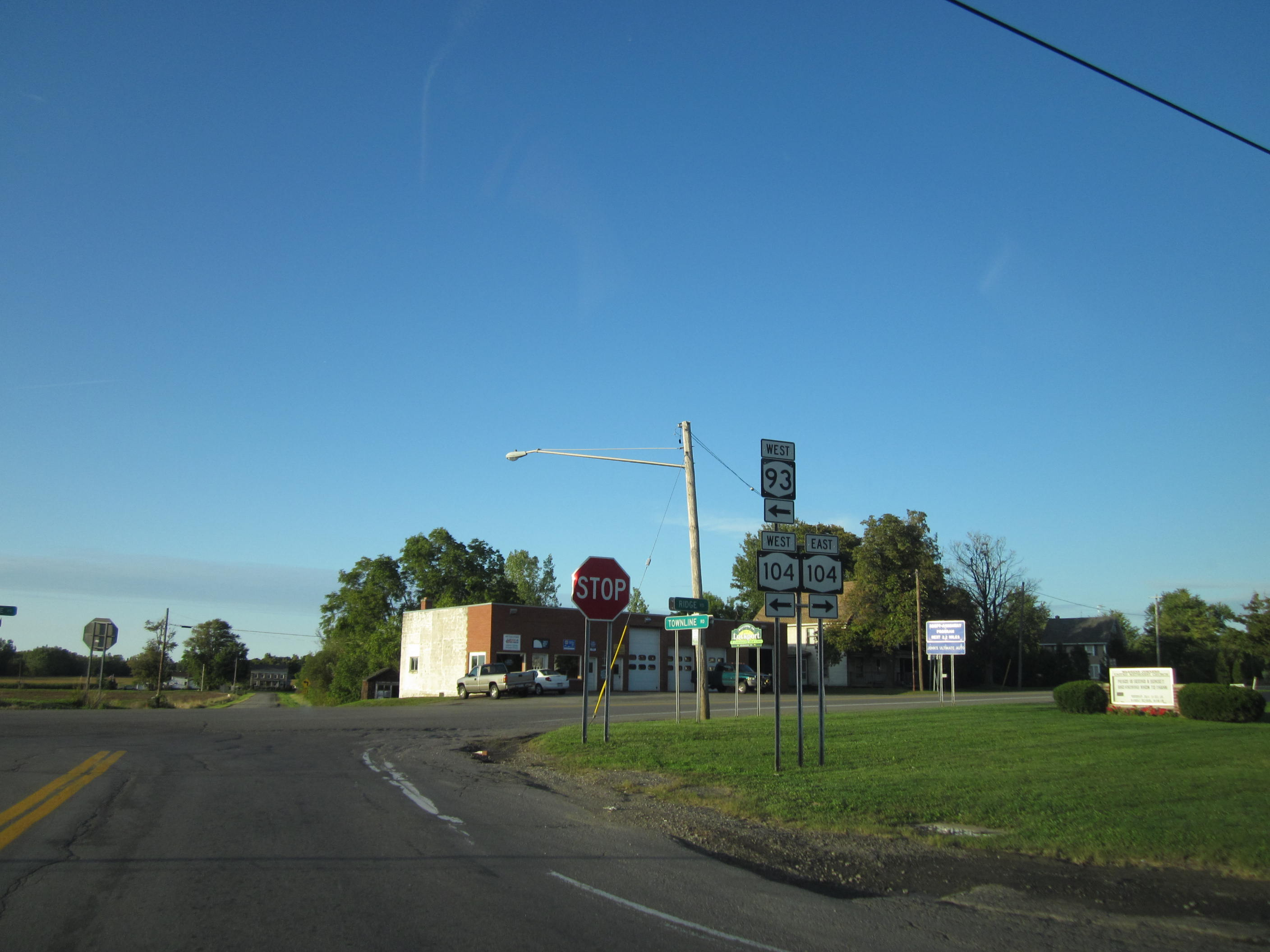
NY 93 westbound at the junction with NY 104 in Warren Corners

Just outside Ransomville, NY 93 leaves the town of Porter for the town of Wilson. It continues generally southeastward across mostly open terrain, meeting Randall Road (CR 83) and Church Street (CR 56) on its way to the town of Cambria. NY 93 becomes North Ridge Road at the town line, and it soon enters the hamlet of North Ridge, a community built up around the route's intersection with NY 425 (Cambria–Wilson Road). The hamlet's residential surroundings continue to the adjacent community of Molyneaux Corners, where NY 93 becomes concurrent with NY 104 (Ridge Road). NY 93 and NY 104 proceed northeast across lightly populated areas for 2 miles (3.2 km) to the hamlet of Warren Corners, at which point NY 93 splits from NY 104 and heads southward along Town Line Road. It immediately intersects with Stone Road (CR 19) before leaving the hamlet.

=== Lockport area ===
Outside of Warren Corners, the route heads across rural areas along the Cambria–Lockport town line. It soon enters the small hamlet of Hickory Corners, where the road passes under Lower Mountain Road (CR 902). Access to the highway is made by way of Town Line Road Spur (CR 114), a connector leading to Lower Mountain Road. NY 93 continues southward along the town line, changing names to Junction Road at an intersection with Upper Mountain Road (CR 5) west of the city of Lockport. From here, the route crosses over CSX Transportation's Lockport Subdivision rail line at the hamlet of Lockport Junction before intersecting with NY 31 (Saunders Settlement Road) and NY 270 (Campbell Boulevard) just south of the community. NY 270 begins straight ahead to the south while NY 93 turns northeast onto Saunders Settlement Road, beginning a concurrency with NY 31.

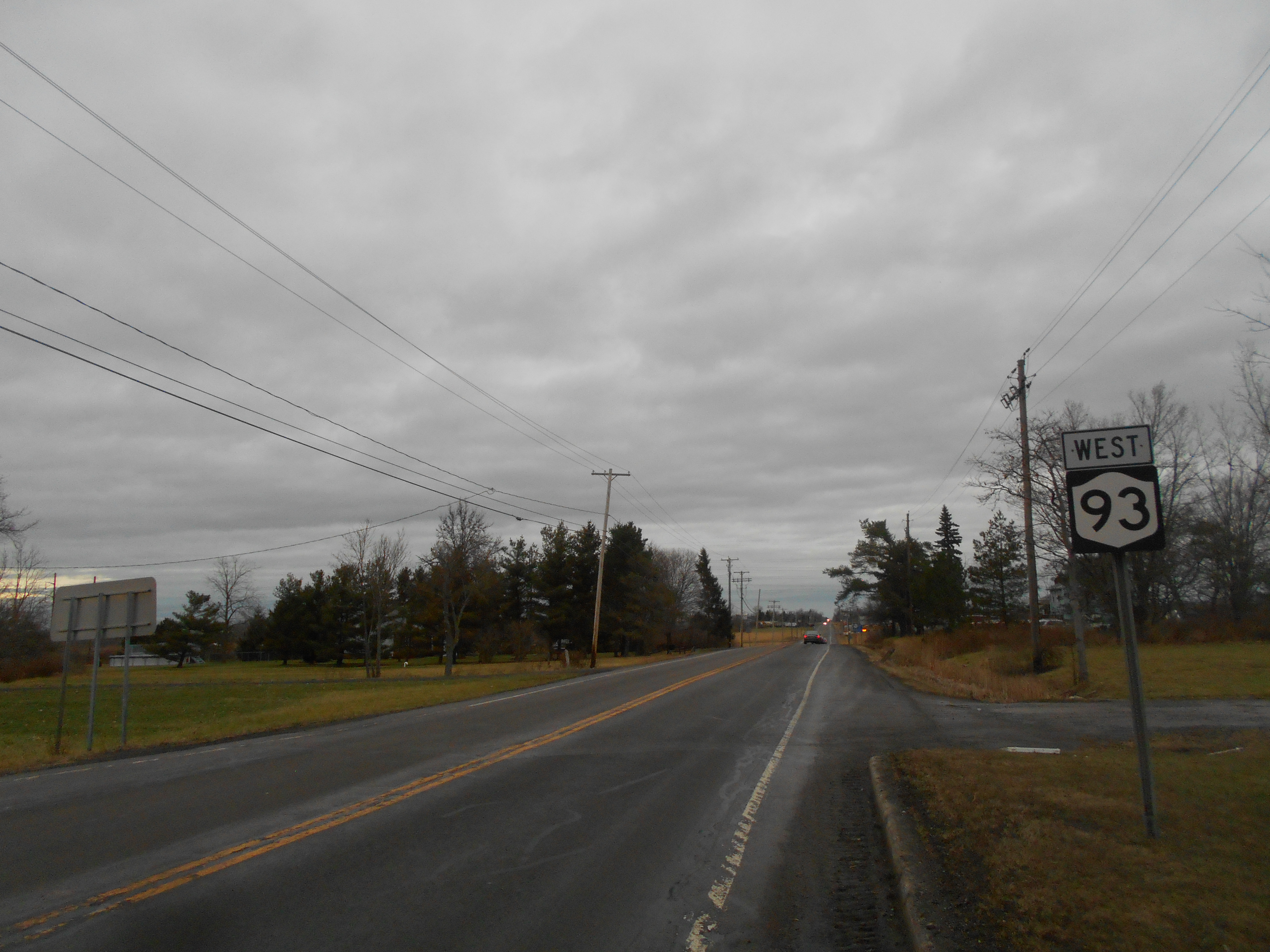
NY 93 westbound after NY 31/NY 270 in Cambria

Now fully in the town of Lockport, NY 31 and NY 93 proceed northeast through an open area of the town as a four-lane divided highway. The two routes continue to the western edge of the city of Lockport, where they intersect with Upper Mountain Road and the Lockport Bypass. The overlap ends here as NY 93 turns southeastward onto the two-lane bypass. Along the bypass, NY 93 briefly enters the city limits as it runs past several industrial facilities and intersects with Hinman Road (CR 903) just ahead of a bridge over the Erie Canal. Past the waterway, the bypass takes a more southerly course through an undeveloped part of the town of Lockport to a junction with Robinson Road (CR 123) on the Lockport–Pendleton town line. The Lockport Bypass ends here, leaving NY 93 to turn eastward onto Robinson Road.

The route initially serves a line of homes as it heads along Robinson Road; however, it soon enters a commercial district surrounding the road's intersection with NY 78 (Transit Road). At this point, the Lockport–Pendleton town line turns south to follow NY 78, leaving NY 93 fully within the town of Lockport as it runs eastward past another stretch of homes. Not far from NY 78, NY 93 changes names to Dysinger Road at an intersection with Beattie Avenue (CR 14) and Raymond Road (CR 85). The junction also marks a shift in the road's surroundings as the homes give way to open, rolling terrain. NY 93 continues eastward for several miles to the town of Royalton, where it meets Riddle Road (CR 35) and Akron Road (CR 142) at adjacent intersections just east of the town line.

=== East of Lockport ===
NY 93 takes over Akron Road's name and right-of-way, continuing eastward past a line of scattered homes to reach the sparsely developed hamlet of Dysinger. Here, the route turns southward at a junction with Bunker Hill Road (CR 136). Outside of Dysinger, NY 93 heads southeastward across undeveloped areas of Royalton, connecting to Block Church Road (CR 110) as it approaches Tonawanda Creek and the Niagara–Erie county line. The road runs along the northern edge of the creek for about 1.5 miles (2.4 km) prior to curving southward at an intersection with Wolcottsville Road (CR 122). The turn brings NY 93 across Tonawanda Creek and into the Erie County town of Newstead, where it becomes known as Maple Road and immediately intersects with CR 260 (Koepsel Road).

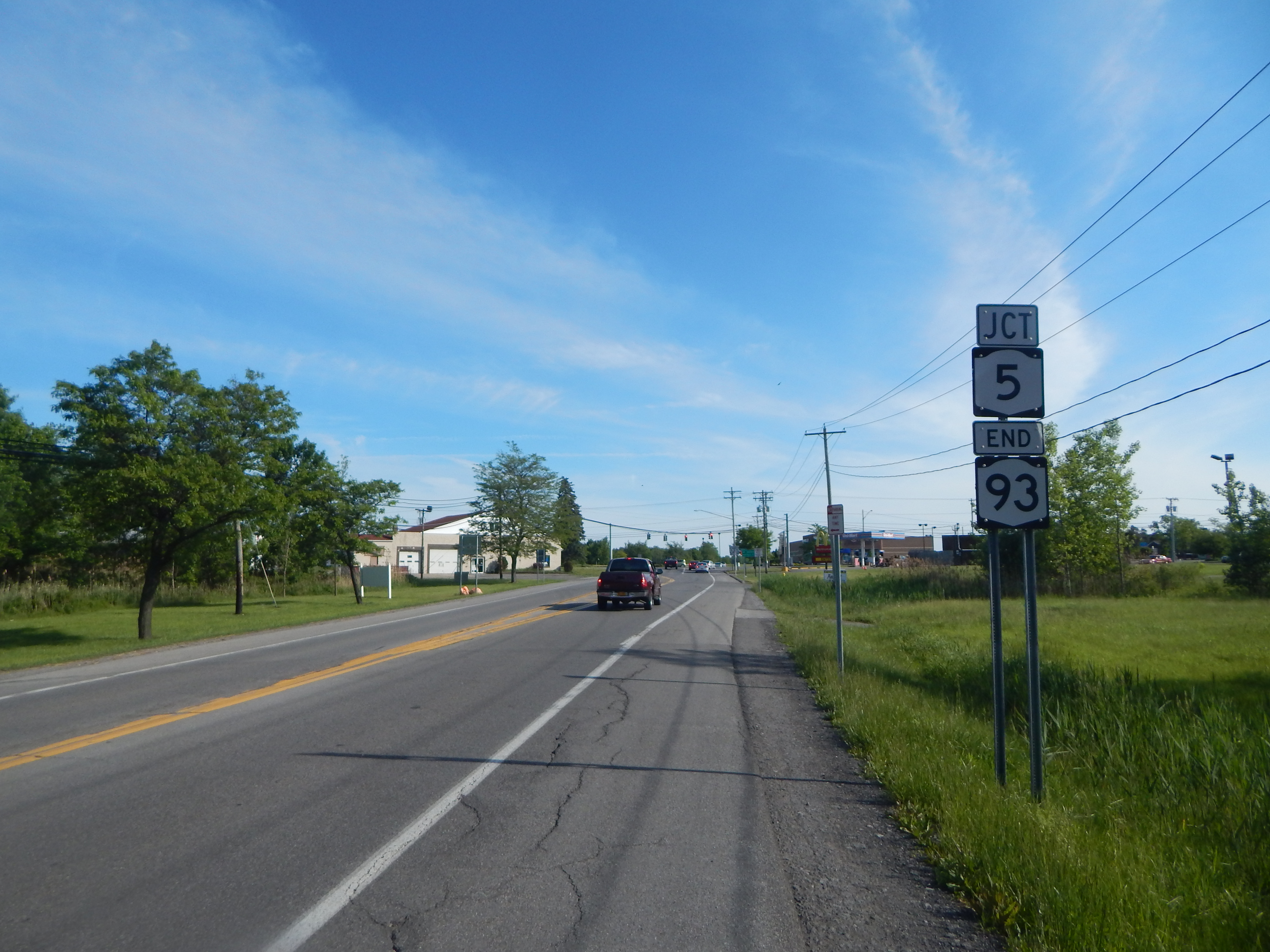
NY 93 at the junction with NY 5, marking the eastern terminus of NY 93

Continuing southward, NY 93 runs across open, rolling terrain, meeting CR 259 (Tonawanda Creek Road) on its way to the hamlet of Swifts Mills. Here, the rural surroundings briefly give way to residential areas as NY 93 intersects with CR 255 (Swift Mills Road) in the center of the community. South of Swifts Mills, the road serves only intermittent stretches of homes for 2 miles (3.2 km), including a cluster of residences around its closely spaced intersections with CR 253 (Carney Road) and CR 42 (Rapids Road). It continues on a southward track past the eastern terminus of CR 218 (Hunts Corner–Akron Road) to the outskirts of the village of Akron, where the highway turns east onto Lewis Road and soon enters the village limits. NY 93 runs past a line of homes before intersecting Cedar Street, a road maintained by Erie County as CR 261 north of the village.

The route turns south at Cedar Street, following the residential street into downtown Akron. Here, NY 93 intersects with CR 573 (John Street) at a junction that was once the western terminus of NY 267. At this intersection, NY 93 heads west on John Street for one block before continuing south on Buffalo Street for another block to Main Street. NY 93 turns westward again, following Main Street through the westernmost part of Akron's central business district prior to curving southwestward at a junction with Mechanic Street. The highway takes on the Mechanic Street name as it crosses over Murder Creek and leaves downtown Akron. Just south of the creek, NY 93 changes names to Buell Street at an intersection with Jackson Street.

As the route continues southward through the southern part of Akron, it serves mostly residential areas, save for an industrial complex at NY 93's intersection with CR 163 (Clarence Center Road) and CR 167 (Parkview Drive). NY 93 exits Akron a short distance south of the junction, at which point the route heads into another area of open fields while retaining the Buell Street name. It continues on a southward track for about 1 mile (1.6 km) to a commercialized intersection with NY 5 (Main Road), where Buell Street and NY 93 both come to an end.

== History ==
=== Designation and early changes ===
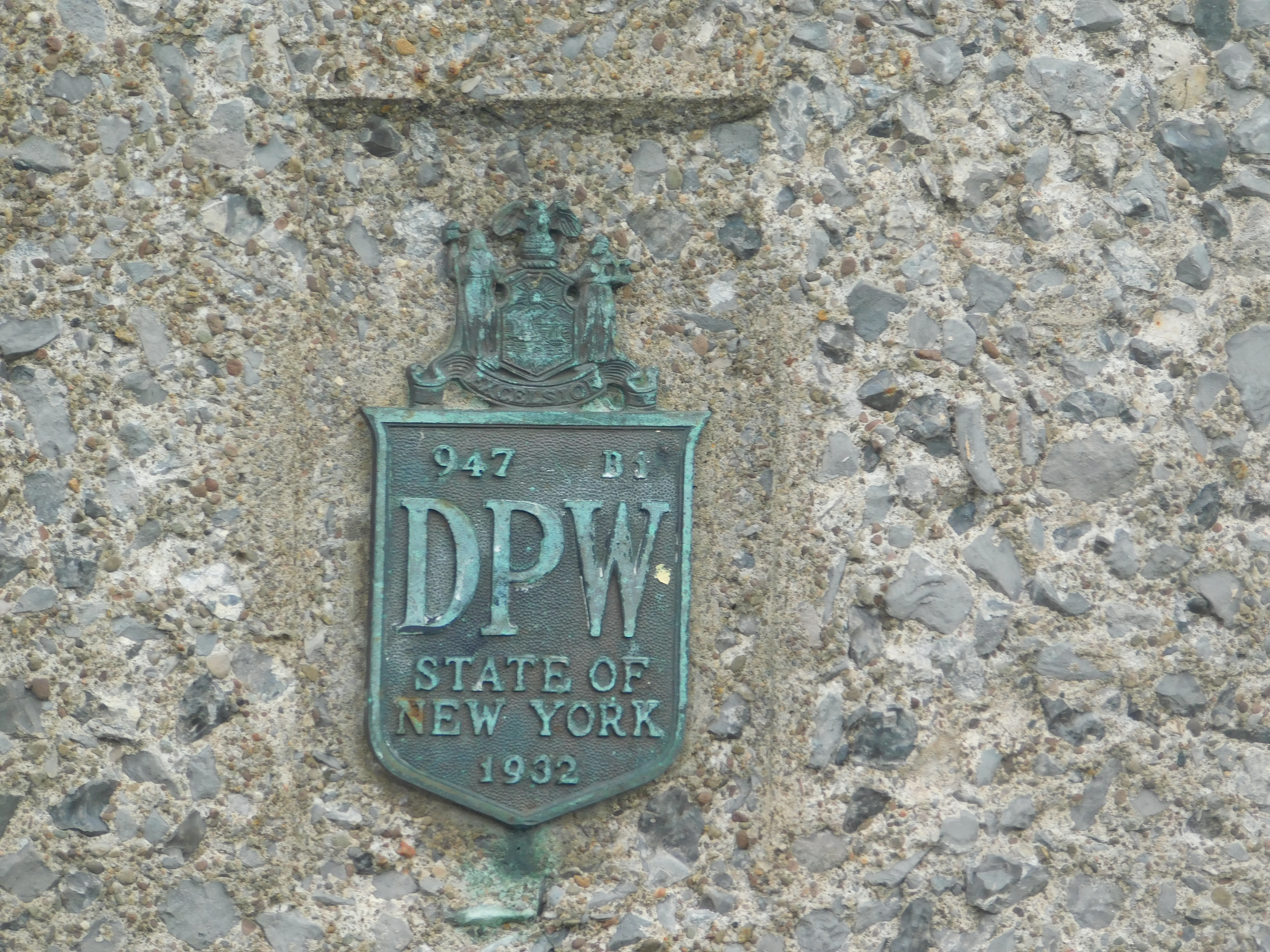
The former New York State Department of Public Works shield on the side of Peters Corners Road. This marker noted that it was a state highway at the time of installation

NY 93 was established as part of the 1930 renumbering of state highways in New York, connecting the cities and villages of Youngstown, Lockport, and Akron. Several portions of the route have been realigned since NY 93 was truncated from NY 33 in Peters Corners in 1935. When NY 93 was first assigned, it turned south at the hamlet of North Ridge and overlapped with NY 425 along Cambria–Wilson Road to Lower Mountain Road, then part of NY 3. NY 425 went west from this junction while NY 93 headed eastward, following NY 3 along Lower Mountain, Gothic Hill, Upper Mountain, and Saunders Settlement roads to the city of Lockport. At Locust Street, NY 93 left NY 3 and exited the city along Locust, High, and Akron streets and Akron Road. It met its current alignment southeast of the city in Royalton.

NY 3 was realigned c. 1932 to follow Saunders Settlement Road between Shawnee Road (NY 425) and Upper Mountain Road. The former routing of NY 3 along Shawnee, Lower Mountain, Gothic Hill, and Upper Mountain roads was redesignated as New York State Route 3A even though all of NY 3's former routing was already part of either NY 425 or NY 93. The NY 3A designation was eliminated c. 1935 when NY 3 was truncated eastward to a new western terminus in central New York. In the early 1940s, NY 93 was altered to follow North Ridge Road, U.S. Route 104 (now NY 104), and Junction Road between North Ridge and Lower Mountain Road.

Around the same time that NY 93 was rerouted, NY 270 was also extended northward along Junction Road from NY 31 to US 104. As a result, NY 93 overlapped NY 270 between Lower Mountain Road and US 104. The overlap with NY 270 remained in place until c. 1963 when NY 270 was truncated southward to the intersection of Lower Mountain and Junction roads. NY 93 was realigned in the late 1970s to bypass Lower Mountain and Gothic Hill Roads on Junction and Upper Mountain roads, replacing NY 270 along Junction Road. The Lower Mountain Road portion of NY 93's former routing is now maintained by Niagara County as County Route 902 (CR 902).

=== Lockport realignments ===
The Lockport Bypass, a highway bypassing downtown Lockport to the southwest, was opened to traffic on July 26, 1991. The highway cost $7.7 million (equivalent to $17.8 million in 2024) to construct and extended from the junction of NY 31 and NY 93 west of the city to Robinson Road south of downtown. NY 93 was realigned to follow the new bypass south to Robinson Road, where it turned east and followed Robinson Road (CR 123) and Dysinger Road (CR 133) to Akron Road in Royalton. The portion of Akron Road (NY 93's former routing) east of the Lockport city limits became NY 954M, an unsigned reference route.

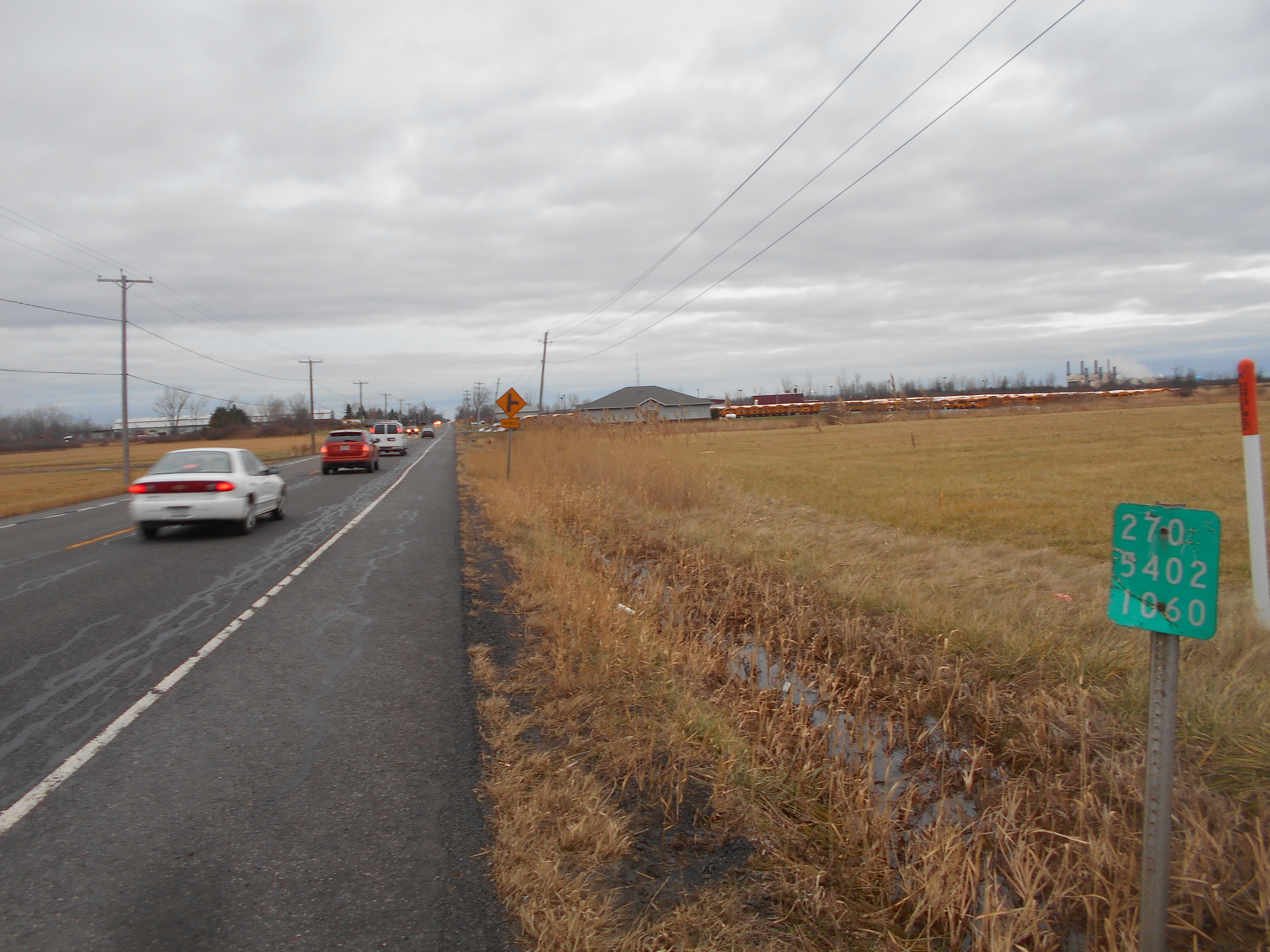
NY 270 reference marker on NY 93 in Cambria

Ownership and maintenance of Robinson Road from the bypass to NY 78 was transferred from Niagara County to the state of New York on September 1, 1990, as part of a highway maintenance swap between the two levels of government. The portion of NY 93 between NY 78 and Akron Road became state-maintained on October 1, 1998, as part of another swap that also transferred ownership and maintenance of Akron Road to Niagara County. Akron Road is now CR 142.

On November 1, 2005, the Niagara County Legislature voted on a measure to allow the county to ask the New York State Department of Transportation (NYSDOT) to remove the NY 93 designation from Upper Mountain Road, a county-maintained highway, and reassign it to Junction Road (NY 270) and Saunders Settlement Road (NY 31). The impetus for the change came from a resident of Upper Mountain Road, who demanded that trucks should be removed from the roadway. This part of the agenda was passed. NYSDOT obliged to the request in 2006, rerouting NY 93 as proposed and truncating NY 270 southward to NY 31.

== Major intersections ==
County	Location	mi	km	Destinations	Notes
Niagara	Youngstown	0.00	0.00	NY 18F (Main Street) – Fort Niagara State Park	Western terminus
Niagara	Youngstown	0.99	1.59	Niagara Scenic Parkway – Lewiston, Niagara Falls, Fort Niagara, 4 Mile Creek State Campsite	Interchange
Niagara	Porter	2.13	3.43	NY 18 (Creek Road)	Hamlet of Towers Corners
Niagara	Cambria	12.08	19.44	NY 425 (Cambria–Wilson Road)	Hamlet of North Ridge
Niagara	Cambria	13.53	21.77	NY 104 west (Ridge Road) – Niagara Falls	Hamlet of Molyneaux Corners; western terminus of NY 93 / NY 104 overlap
Niagara	Cambria–Lockport town line	15.74	25.33	NY 104 east (Ridge Road)	Hamlet of Warrens Corners; eastern terminus of NY 93 / NY 104 overlap
Niagara	Cambria–Lockport town line	20.35	32.75	NY 31 west (Saunders Settlement Road) – Niagara Falls NY 270 south (Campbell Boulevard) – North Tonawanda, Buffalo	Western terminus of NY 31 / NY 93 overlap; northern terminus of NY 270
Niagara	Town of Lockport	22.09	35.55	NY 31 east (Saunders Settlement Road)	Eastern terminus of NY 31 / NY 93 overlap
Niagara	Lockport–Pendleton town line	25.21	40.57	NY 78 (Transit Road)	Hamlet of South Lockport
Niagara	Royalton	29.62	47.67	CR 142 (Akron Road)	Former routing of NY 93
Erie	Akron	41.34	66.53	CR 573 (John Street)	Former western terminus of NY 267
Erie	Newstead	43.08	69.33	NY 5 (Main Road) – Batavia, Buffalo	Eastern terminus
1.000 mi = 1.609 km; 1.000 km = 0.621 mi: Concurrency terminus

== See also ==
- List of county routes in Niagara County, New York
