= North Ridge =

North Ridge may refer to:

- North Ridge (Grand Teton), a climbing route
- North Ridge, Accra, a neighbourhood of Accra, Ghana
- North Ridge, New York, a hamlet in the United States
- North Ridge United Methodist Church, in North Ridge, New York, United States
- North Ridge Country Club, a neighborhood and golf club in Raleigh, North Carolina, United States
