= Cambria, New York =

- Town
- Flag Seal

- Location in Niagara County and the state of New York.
- Coordinates: 43°10′15″N 78°49′48″W
- Country: United States
- State: New York
- County: Niagara
- Named after: Cambria (Wales)

Government
  - Type: Town Council
  - Town Supervisor: Matthew P. Foe
  - Town Council: Members' List: • Joseph Ohol (D); • Robert E. Blackman (R); • George J. Bush (R); • Randy M. Roberts (R)

Area
  - Total: 39.71 sq mi (102.85 km^{2})
  - Land: 39.71 sq mi (102.85 km^{2})
  - Water: 0 sq mi (0.00 km^{2})
- Elevation: 531 ft (162 m)

Population (2020)
  - Total: 5,743
  - Density: 146/sq mi (56.4/km^{2})
- Time zone: UTC-5 (Eastern (EST))
  - Summer (DST): UTC-4 (EDT)
- ZIP Codes: 14094 (Lockport); 14131 (Ransomville); 14132 (Sanborn)
- FIPS code: 36-11803
- GNIS feature ID: 0978775
- Website: townofcambria.gov

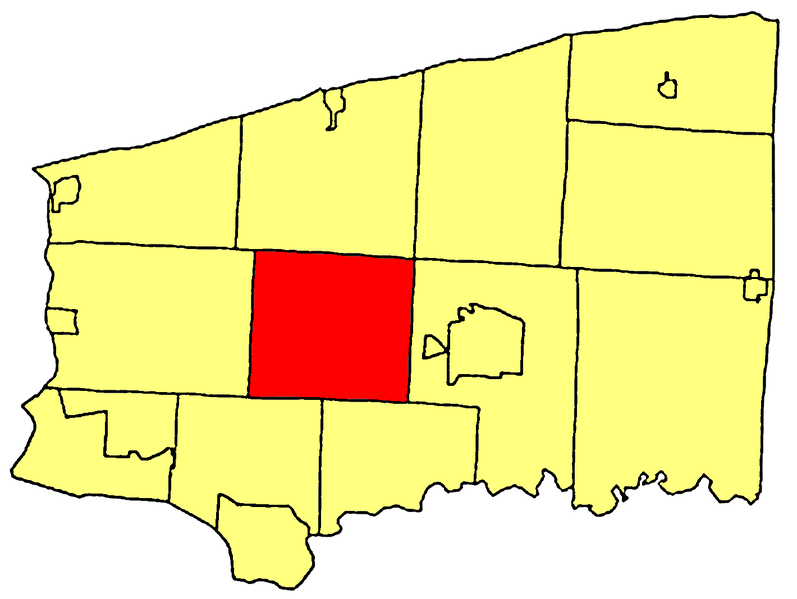
Location within Niagara County.

Cambria is a town in Niagara County, New York, United States. The population was 5,743 at the 2020 census. Cambria is an early name for Wales.

The Town of Cambria is in the center of Niagara County.

New York State Route 93 and New York State Route 104 pass through the town.

== History ==
Some of the early settlers were from Wales, and gave the town the name of their origin.

The Town of Cambria was established in 1808 when Niagara county was formed. Cambria was the original town of Niagara County; all other towns were formed from its territory after 1812.

When Genesee County, New York was formed in 1802, all of Niagara County was included and was part of the Town of Batavia. Subsequently, Erie County was created by removing the Towns of Willink and Clarence, both towns having been created from Cambria in Niagara County.

== Geography ==
According to the United States Census Bureau, the town has a total area of 39.9 square miles (103 km^{2}), all land.

The Town of Cambria is west of the City of Lockport and northeast of the City of Niagara Falls.

== Notable people ==
- Bates Cooke, former US Congressman and New York State Comptroller
- Jerome B. Chaffee, first senator of the state of Colorado
- The Seven Sutherland Sisters, long-haired singing group traveling with Barnum and Bailey's "Greatest Show on Earth"

== Adjacent towns ==
- Town of Lewiston - west
- Town of Wheatfield - southwest
- Town of Pendleton - southeast
- Town of Lockport - east
- Town of Ransomville
- Town of Wilson - north

== Major highways in the Town of Cambria ==
- New York State Route 31 (Saunders Settlement Rd.), East-West Highway through the town from the Lewiston town line to the Lockport town line.
- New York State Route 93 (Ridge Rd., N. Ridge Rd., Youngstown-Lockport Rd.), east–west roadway through the northeastern part of town from the Wilson town line to the Lockport town line where NY 93 then heads south on its west route and makes up the eastern Cambria town line as Town Line Rd. (Lockport Town Line Rd.) from NY 104 to NY 31. (NY 93 also runs concurrent with NY 104 from the Lockport town line to N. Ridge Rd. where NY 93 heads north towards Youngstown.)
- New York State Route 104 (Ridge Rd.), east–west highway through the northern part of town from the Lewiston town line to the Lockport town line.
- New York State Route 270 (Campbell Blvd.), north–south roadway through the town from its northern end at Saunders Settlement Rd. (NY 31) to the Pendleton town line.
- New York State Route 425 (Shawnee Rd., Lower Mountain Rd., Cambria-Wilson Rd.), north–south roadway through the town from the Wheatfield town line to the Wilson town line.
- New York State Route 429 (Town Line Rd.), north–south roadway that forms the western town line from Saunders Settlement Rd. (NY 31) to its northern terminus at Ridge Rd. (NY 104).

== Demographics ==
Historical population
Census	Pop.	Note	%±
1820	1,134		—
1830	1,712		51.0%
1840	2,099		22.6%
1850	2,366		12.7%
1860	2,308		−2.5%
1870	2,145		−7.1%
1880	2,267		5.7%
1890	2,007		−11.5%
1900	1,880		−6.3%
1910	1,749		−7.0%
1920	1,596		−8.7%
1930	1,786		11.9%
1940	1,925		7.8%
1950	2,346		21.9%
1960	3,661		56.1%
1970	4,193		14.5%
1980	4,419		5.4%
1990	4,779		8.1%
2000	5,391		12.8%
2010	5,839		8.3%
2020	5,743		−1.6%
U.S. Decennial Census

As of the census of 2000, there were 5,393 people, 1,995 households, and 1,524 families residing in the town. The population density was 135.3 inhabitants per square mile (52.2/km^{2}). There were 2,066 housing units at an average density of 51.8 per square mile (20.0/km^{2}). The racial makeup of the town was 98.29% White, 0.26% African American, 0.50% Native American, 0.41% Asian, 0.02% Pacific Islander, 0.06% from other races, and 0.46% from two or more races. Hispanic or Latino of any race were 0.52% of the population.

There were 1,995 households, out of which 34.2% had children under the age of 18 living with them, 66.1% were married couples living together, 6.2% had a female householder with no husband present, and 23.6% were non-families. 19.8% of all households were made up of individuals, and 9.2% had someone living alone who was 65 years of age or older. The average household size was 2.70 and the average family size was 3.10.

In the town, the population was spread out, with 25.4% under the age of 18, 6.6% from 18 to 24, 29.5% from 25 to 44, 24.8% from 45 to 64, and 13.6% who were 65 years of age or older. The median age was 39 years. For every 100 females, there were 99.3 males. For every 100 females age 18 and over, there were 97.1 males.

The median income for a household in the town was $46,534, and the median income for a family was $54,583. Males had a median income of $45,767 versus $25,545 for females. The per capita income for the town was $20,397. About 4.1% of families and 5.1% of the population were below the poverty line, including 5.7% of those under age 18 and 5.2% of those age 65 or over.

== Communities and locations in Cambria ==
- Cambria Center – A hamlet at the junction of Lower Mountain Road and Cambria-Wilson Road (Route 425).
- Cambria Station – A hamlet near the south town line on Shawnee Road (Route 425).
- Comstock Corners – A location in the southeast corner at the junction of Saunders Settlement Road and Comstock Road.
- Hickory Corners – A hamlet at the eastern town line on Town Line Road (Route 93).
- Molyneaux Corners – A hamlet in the northeast corner of the town on Ridge Road, named after early settler William Molyneaux.
- North Ridge – A hamlet near the north town line on Cambria-Wilson Road (Route 425). The North Ridge United Methodist Church was listed on the National Register of Historic Places in 2002.
- Pekin – A hamlet on the west town line on Upper Mountain Road. Pekin was a stop on the Underground Railroad.
- Sanborn – A hamlet partly in Cambria. Most of Sanborn is in the Town of Lewiston.
- Streeters Corners – A hamlet north of Cambria Center on Cambria-Wilson Road (Route 425) and Ridge Road (Route 104).
- Warrens Corners – A hamlet in the northeast corner of the town on Ridge Road (Route 104).

== Adjacent towns and areas ==
Cambria borders on the towns of Wilson (to the north), Lockport (to the east), Pendleton and Wheatfield (both to the south), and Lewiston (to the west).

== Information about Cambria ==
SUNY Niagara is located in Cambria northeast of Sanborn, on the corner of Saunders Settlement Road (New York State Route 31) and Town Line Road (New York State Route 429).
