= Wendelville, New York =

Hamlet in New York, United States

Coordinates: 43°04′16″N 78°46′14″W

Wendelville is a hamlet in the town of Pendleton in Niagara County, New York, United States.

== Geography ==
Wendelville is located in Western New York and is northeast of Buffalo.

Wendelville is located in the south-central part of the Town of Pendleton, the hamlet center being at the intersection of Campbell Boulevard (NY 270) and Tonawanda Creek Road North (CR 60). The Wendelville Volunteer Fire Company Station #1 is located on the northwest corner of this intersection.
