= Hoffman, New York =

Hamlet in New York, United States

Coordinates: 43°04′10″N 78°49′22″W

Hoffman is a hamlet in the towns of Pendleton and Wheatfield in Niagara County, New York, United States.
