= Comstock Corners, New York =

Hamlet in New York, United States

Coordinates: 43°08′41″N 78°46′56″W

Comstock Corners is a hamlet in the town of Cambria in Niagara County, New York, United States.
