= Seven Sutherland Sisters =

American singers

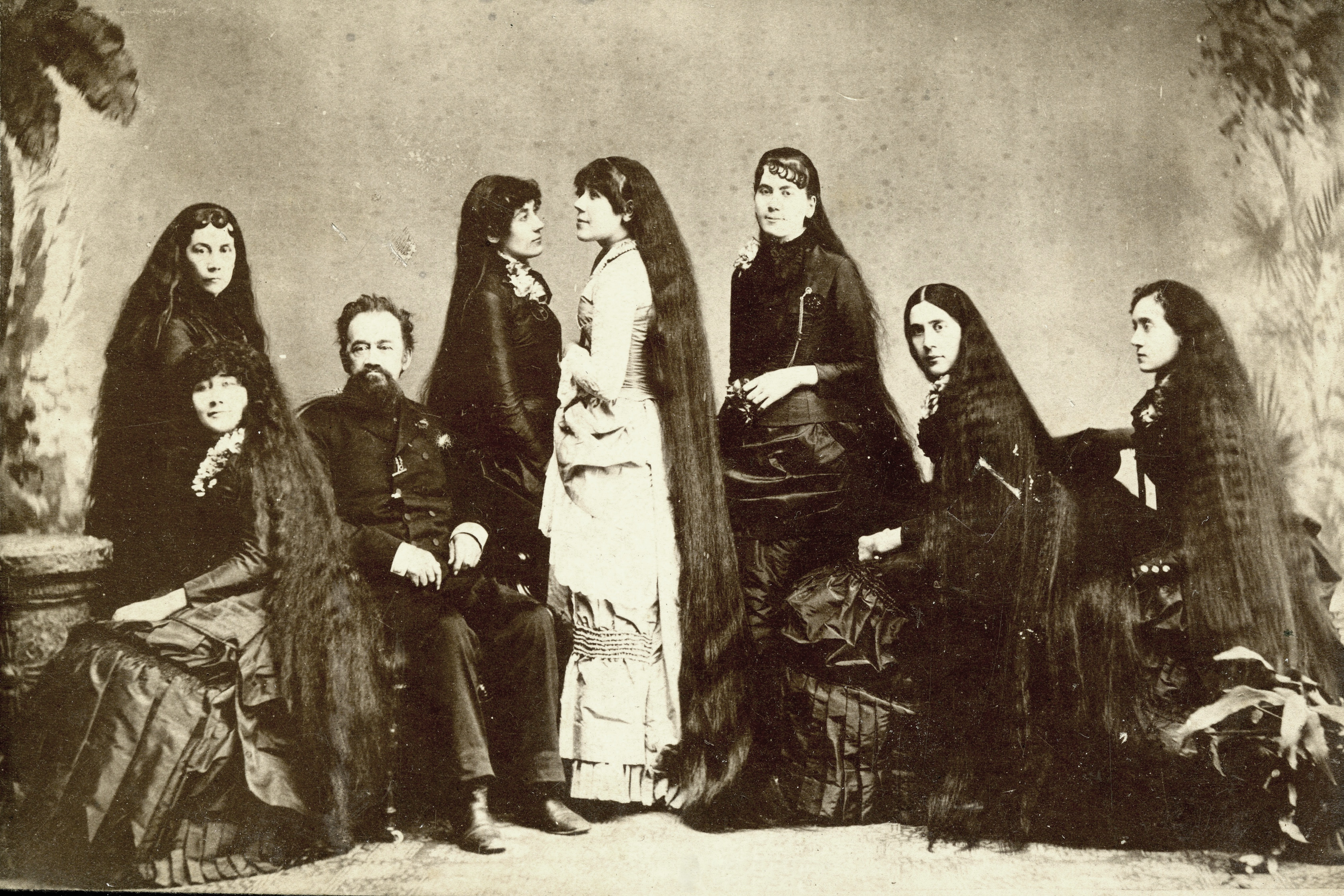
The Seven Sutherland Sisters pose for a publicity photo. When appearing with Barnum & Bailey's, their photos were usually arranged so that their hair touched the floor.

The Seven Sutherland Sisters was a singing group which included the seven daughters of Fletcher and Mary Sutherland of Lockport, New York. They appeared with Barnum and Bailey's from the late 1880s to the early 1900s. Their distinguishing feature was their long hair; publicity about the length and texture of their hair enabled the Sutherlands to create a successful line of patent medicine hair and scalp care products.

== Family ==
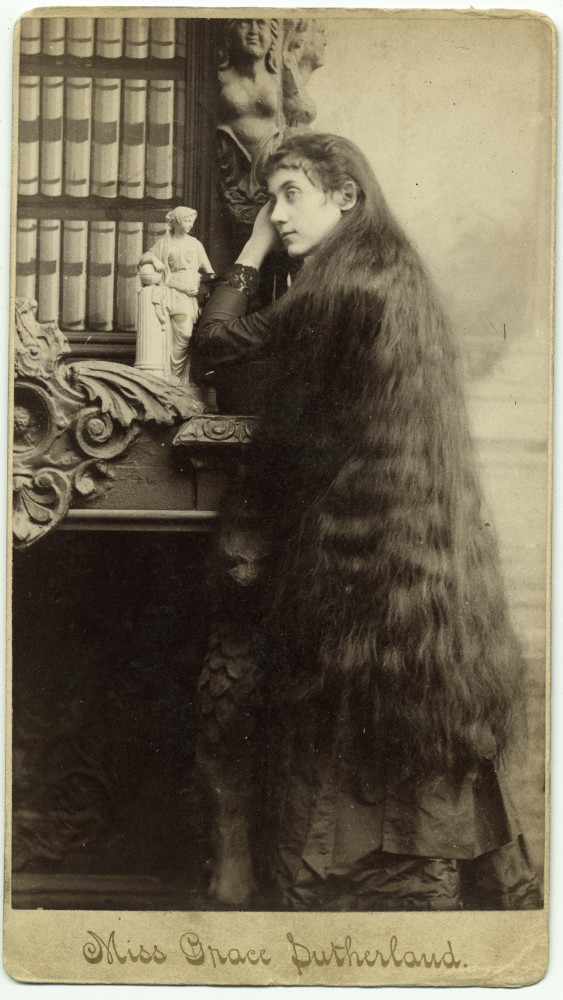
Grace Sutherland, about 1890

The Seven Sutherland Sisters was a family act from Niagara County, New York that performed worldwide to great acclaim. Daughters of Fletcher and Mary (Brink) Sutherland, they started doing concerts with a brother in the early 1880s, and three years later the sisters were traveling with Barnum and Bailey's "Greatest Show on Earth."

The children of Fletcher and Mary Sutherland included:

- Sarah (1845–1919)
- Victoria (1849–1902)
- Isabella (1852–1914)
- Grace (1854–1946)
- Naomi (1858–1893)
- Dora (1860–1926)
- Mary (1862–1939)

Fletcher and Mary Sutherland were buried at Glenwood Cemetery in Lockport, as were most of the sisters.

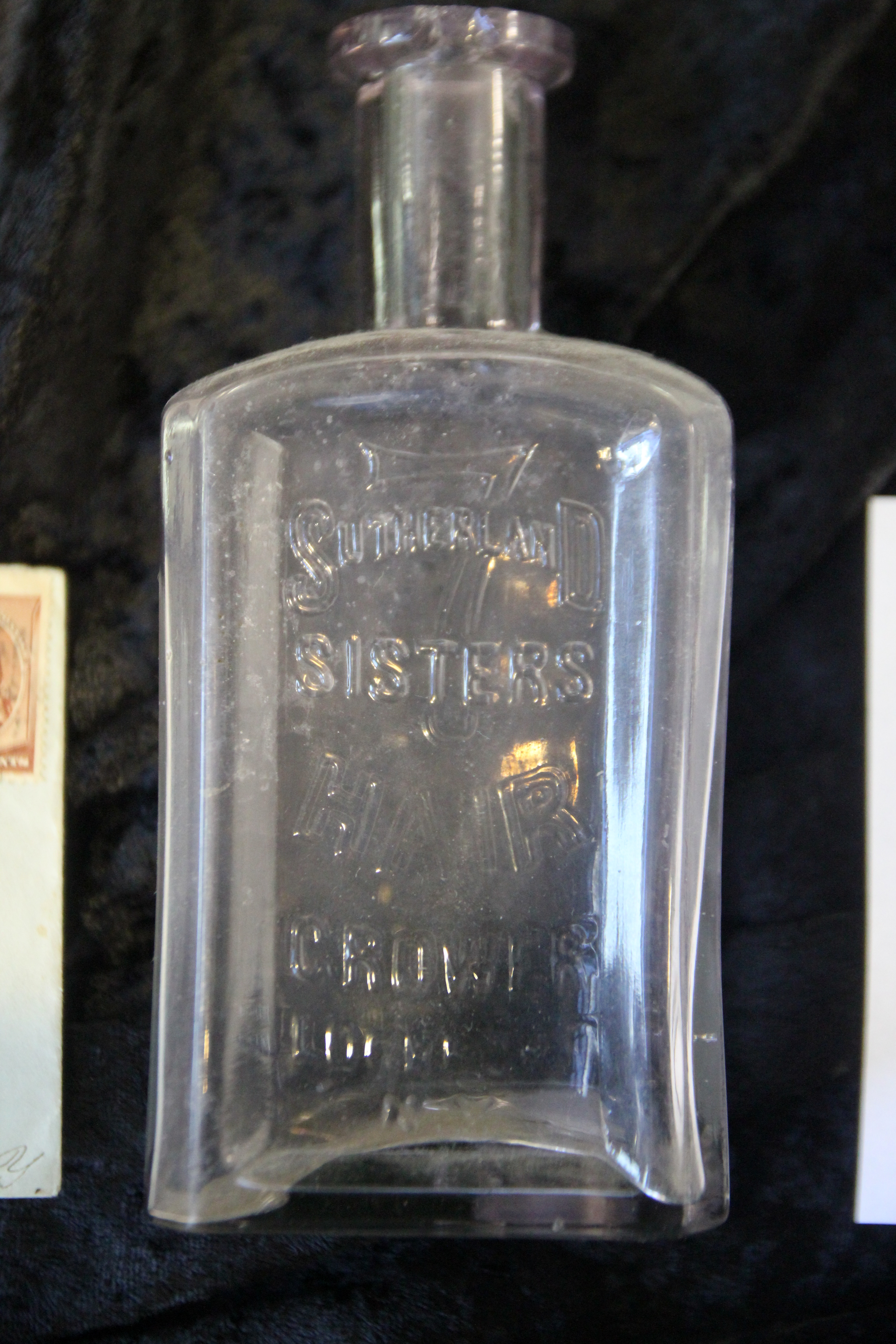
Sutherland hair tonic bottle

== Career ==
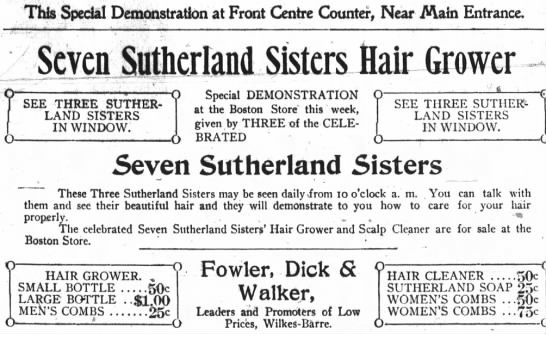
1900 Seven Sutherland Sisters newspaper advertisement

With fans fascinated by their hair, which reached a collective length of over 37 ft (11 m), Fletcher Sutherland went on to create a patent medicine, "The Seven Sutherland Sisters Hair Grower", which was mostly witch hazel and bay rum, along with traces of hydrochloric acid, salt, and magnesium. The tonic quickly became a best seller, and the line of Sutherland Sisters hair products expanded to include a scalp cleanser, brushes and combs, and "Hair Colorators." In addition to wholesaling their products to retail stores, they also made public appearances at retail outlets, and maintained several outlets of their own – "parlors" where customers could consult with a salesperson and make purchases—including one in New York City. When Naomi died in 1893, the Sutherlands auditioned for a replacement, and hired Anna Louise Roberts to join their act. Roberts made headlines in 1927 when she was over 60 and her husband and she became destitute as the result of a house fire.

The Sutherlands resided in a mansion they built in Warrens Corners, New York, which burned down in 1938. Even though hairstyles changed over time, and the short hair of the flappers became fashionable in the 1920s, the Seven Sutherland Sisters hair care products were successful for years after their singing act ended in the mid-1910s; print ads for them appeared in newspapers until the mid-1920s.

Published accounts indicate that the sisters did not save or invest wisely, and some of them later became destitute. When the last living sister, Grace, died in 1946 at age 92, she was buried in an unmarked grave.
