= Cambria Center, New York =

Hamlet in New York, United States

Coordinates: 43°10′40″N 78°49′10″W

Cambria Center is a hamlet in the town of Cambria in Niagara County, New York, United States.
