= Beach Ridge, New York =

Hamlet in New York, United States

Coordinates: 43°05′05″N 78°49′23″W

Beach Ridge is a hamlet in the town of Pendleton in Niagara County, New York, United States.
