= New York State Route 356 =

Former state highway in New York State

New York State Route 356
- Map of the Buffalo–Niagara Falls area with the pre-1980 routing of NY 356 highlighted in red

Route information
- Maintained by NYSDOT
- Length: 2.77 mi (Note: Approximate length; a 700-foot (210 m) section of NY 356's former routing near modern I-990 no longer exists.) (4.46 km)
- Existed: 1930–January 7, 1988

Major junctions
- West end: NY 265 in city of Tonawanda
- East end: NY 270 in Amherst

Location
- Country: United States
- State: New York
- Counties: Erie

Highway system
- New York Highways; Interstate; US; State; Reference; Parkways
← NY 355	→ NY 357

New York State Route 356 (NY 356) was an east–west state highway in Erie County, New York, in United States. The final western terminus of the route was at an intersection with U.S. Route 62 (US 62) on the Tonawanda–Amherst town line. Its eastern terminus was at a junction with NY 270 in the Amherst hamlet of Getzville. When NY 356 was first assigned in the 1930 renumbering of state highways in New York, it began at NY 384 in the city of Tonawanda. It was truncated to US 62 in 1980 and removed entirely on January 7, 1988. The former routing of NY 356 east of the Tonawanda city limits is now maintained by Erie County.

== Route description ==
NY 356 began at an intersection with NY 265 in the city of Tonawanda. It headed eastward on Young Street, then North Ellicott Creek Road, running along the northern edge of Ellicott Creek as it headed through the town of Amherst. NY 356 met Sweet Home Road, a local highway leading to the main campus of SUNY Buffalo, and crossed over Ellicott Creek shortly afterward. Not far to the northeast of the creek, North Ellicott Creek Road merged into Dodge Road. NY 356 continued east on Dodge Road to the hamlet of Getzville, where it ended at a junction with NY 270.

== History ==
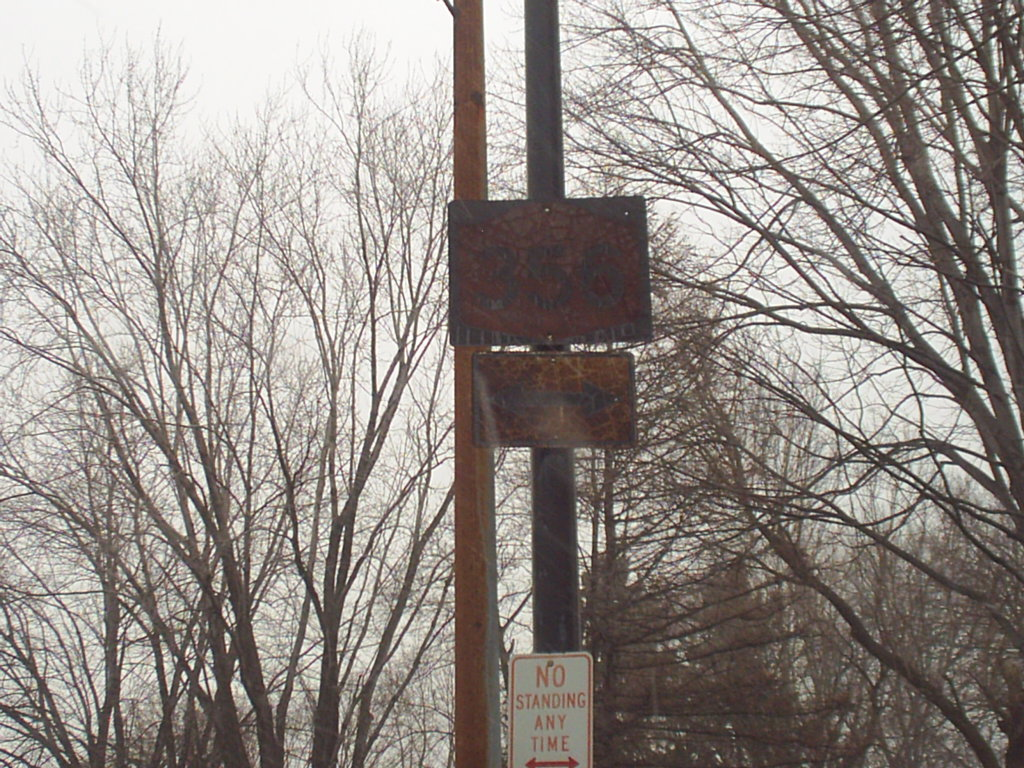
An old NY 356 shield in Tonawanda.

NY 356 was assigned as part of the 1930 renumbering of state highways in New York. It began at NY 384 (now NY 266) in the city of Tonawanda and ended at NY 270 in the hamlet of Getzville. On April 1, 1980, ownership and maintenance of NY 356 between the Tonawanda city line and US 62 was transferred from the state of New York to Erie County as part of a highway maintenance swap between the two levels of government. As a result, NY 356 was truncated eastward to begin at US 62. The NY 356 designation was removed entirely on January 7, 1988. The former routing of NY 356 is now maintained by Erie County as County Route 580 (CR 580) from the Tonawanda city line to US 62, CR 232 between US 62 and Sweet Home Road, and CR 294 (North Forest Road) and CR 45 (Dodge Road) east of Ellicott Creek. The portion of NY 356's former routing that traversed Ellicott Creek was dismantled as part of Interstate 990's construction.

== Major intersections ==
The entire route was in Erie County.

Location	mi	km	Destinations	Notes
Tonawanda–Amherst town line	0.00	0.00	US 62	
Amherst	1.27	2.04	Sweet Home Road (NY 952T)	Serves SUNY Buffalo
Amherst	2.77	4.46	NY 270	Hamlet of Getzville
1.000 mi = 1.609 km; 1.000 km = 0.621 mi

== See also ==
- List of county routes in Erie County, New York
