= Pendleton (hamlet), New York =

Hamlet in New York, United States

Coordinates: 43°05′13″N 78°43′40″W

Pendleton is a hamlet in the town of Pendleton in Niagara County, New York, United States.
