= Pendleton Center, New York =

Hamlet in New York, United States

Coordinates: 43°06′25″N 78°46′22″W

Pendleton Center is a hamlet in the town of Pendleton in Niagara County, New York, United States.
