= Sylvester Pendleton Clark =

Sylvester Pendleton Clark was the governor of Grand Island, and the founder of Pendleton, New York. He built and opened a log tavern there and became its postmaster in 1823. He led a rebellion against government taxes in the early 19th century.
