= Pendleton, New York =

- Town
- Location in Niagara County and the state of New York.
- Coordinates: 43°6′N 78°46′W
- Country: United States
- State: New York
- County: Niagara
- Named for: Sylvester Pendleton Clark

Government
  - Type: Town Council
  - Town Supervisor: Joel Maerten(R)
  - Town Council: Members' List: • Wolfgang Buechler (R); • Joseph Hickman (D); • Scott Lombardo (R); • Dylan Rumbold (R)

Area
  - Total: 27.36 sq mi (70.85 km^{2})
  - Land: 27.09 sq mi (70.15 km^{2})
  - Water: 0.27 sq mi (0.70 km^{2})
- Elevation: 594 ft (181 m)

Population (2020)
  - Total: 7,035
  - Density: 260/sq mi (100.3/km^{2})
- Time zone: UTC-5 (Eastern (EST))
  - Summer (DST): UTC-4 (EDT)
- ZIP Codes: 14094 (Lockport); 14120 (North Tonawanda)
- Area code: 716
- FIPS code: 36-57111
- GNIS feature ID: 0979351
- Website: pendletonny.gov

Pendleton is a town on the southern edge of Niagara County, New York, United States. It is east of the city of Niagara Falls and southwest of the city of Lockport. The population was 7,035 at the 2020 census.

== History ==
The town of Pendleton was set apart in 1827 from part of the town of Niagara. Sylvester Pendleton Clark, one of the first settlers, gave his name to several locations in the town and eventually to the town itself. Clark served in the American Revolution and became an innkeeper and postmaster.

Starpoint Central school was established in 1956. It was named Starpoint because the new school system serviced the entire area of Pendleton, parts of Cambria, Lockport, Wheatfield and Royalton. Starpoint is at the center of the 5 point star of municipalities. It is located on Mapleton Road and provides education for grades K to 12. It currently services about 5300 families over a 115-square-mile (300 km^{2}) area. Expansion of the schools has taken place in recent years to accommodate an increase of school population.

Up until recently, Pendleton has been primarily an agricultural community. It now is rezoning much of its land area for residential subdivisions and business. The population of Pendleton continues to grow as more residential development takes place.

Pendleton has an all-volunteer fire company serviced by Wendelville Fire company.

In March 2010, Sir Benjamin Ruppert, Esq., of the Western New York Residency Evaluation Committee, nominated Pendleton for "Best Place to Grow Up in America."

== Geography ==
According to the United States Census Bureau, the town has a total area of 27.4 square miles (71 km^{2}), of which 27.1 square miles (70 km^{2}) is land and 0.3 square miles (0.78 km^{2}) (0.99%) is water.

The south border of the town is Tonawanda Creek, which forms the border between Niagara County and Erie County. The Erie Canal passes through the eastern part of the town, where it connects to Tonawanda Creek.

=== Communities and locations in Pendleton ===
- Beach Ridge – A hamlet by the western town line.
- Hoffman – A hamlet on the western town line near Tonawanda Creek.
- Mapleton – A small hamlet in the northwest corner of the town.
- North Buffalo Suburban Airport (0G0) – A small general aviation airport on the west side of Route 78 (Transit Road) and south of Lockport. It was formerly known as "Transit Airport."
- Pendleton – A small hamlet located by the southern town line.
- Pendleton Center – A hamlet centrally located in the town on NY-270.
- Wendelville – A hamlet near Tonawanda Creek on NY-270.

=== Adjacent cities and towns ===
- Town of Wheatfield – west
- Erie County, Town of Amherst – south
- Town of Lockport – east
- City of Lockport – northeast
- Town of Cambria – north

=== Major highways ===
- New York State Route 78 (Transit Rd.), north–south highway that marks the east town line.
- New York State Route 93 (Robinson Rd.), east–west highway that borders the north corner of the town from Transit Rd. (NY 78) to the Lockport Bypass which takes NY 93 north of the town.
- New York State Route 270 (Campbell Blvd.), north–south highway through the town from the Amherst town line to the Cambria town line.

== Demographics ==
Historical population
Census	Pop.	Note	%±
1830	577		—
1840	1,098		90.3%
1850	2,166		97.3%
1860	1,833		−15.4%
1870	1,772		−3.3%
1880	1,730		−2.4%
1890	1,514		−12.5%
1900	1,364		−9.9%
1910	1,267		−7.1%
1920	1,175		−7.3%
1930	1,253		6.6%
1940	1,516		21.0%
1950	1,815		19.7%
1960	3,589		97.7%
1970	4,733		31.9%
1980	4,726		−0.1%
1990	5,010		6.0%
2000	6,050		20.8%
2010	6,397		5.7%
2020	7,035		10.0%
U.S. Decennial Census

As of the census of 2000, there were 6,050 people, 2,116 households, and 1,724 families residing in the town. The population density was 222.6 inhabitants per square mile (85.9/km^{2}). There were 2,162 housing units at an average density of 79.5 per square mile (30.7/km^{2}). The racial makeup of the town was 98.5% White, 0.4% African American, 0.2% Native American, 0.3% Asian, 0.00% Pacific Islander, 0.03% from other races, and 0.6% from two or more races. Hispanic or Latino of any race were 0.6% of the population.

There were 2,116 households, out of which 39.4% had children under the age of 18 living with them, 72.4% were married couples living together, 6.3% had a female householder with no husband present, and 18.5% were non-families. 14.9% of all households were made up of individuals, and 6.7% had someone living alone who was 65 years of age or older. The average household size was 2.85 and the average family size was 3.19.

In the town, the population was spread out, with 27.6% under the age of 18, 5.9% from 18 to 24, 30.0% from 25 to 44, 25.1% from 45 to 64, and 11.4% who were 65 years of age or older. The median age was 39 years. For every 100 females, there were 100.4 males. For every 100 females age 18 and over, there were 99.2 males.

The median income for a household in the town was $60,625, and the median income for a family was $63,342. Males had a median income of $46,175 versus $33,466 for females. The per capita income for the town was $23,651. About 3.9% of families and 4.7% of the population were below the poverty line, including 6.5% of those under age 18 and 2.8% of those age 65 or over.

=== Town parks ===
Pendleton has three town parks.

- Depeau Park – located on Tonawanda Creek Road North at the end of Irish and Oakwood Rds.
- Nine Mile Island – located in Amherst but owned by Pendleton.
- Pendleton Town Park – located in Pendleton Center. This park is located behind Pendleton Town Hall and the Pendleton Historic Society. Baseball diamonds, picnic shelters, and a playground are also located here. On the Fourth of July, the park hosts a popular fireworks show.

== Notable people ==
- Sylvester Pendleton Clark, founder of Pendleton
- Richard Crowley, former U.S. Congressman
- Patrick Higgins, UTEP Miners offensive coordinator
- Walter Koppisch, former NFL player
- Robert F. Landel, physical chemist at Jet Propulsion Lab noted for contributions to polymer science
- Nick Langworthy, U.S. Congressman
- Timothy McVeigh, domestic terrorist who was convicted for the Oklahoma City bombing. He attended Starpoint High School.
- Joyce Carol Oates, famous writer who was also a resident of Pendleton.
- Ed O'Neil, retired NFL player, current football coach
