= New York State Route 270 =

State highway in western New York, US

New York State Route 270
- Campbell Boulevard
- Map of western New York with NY 270 highlighted in red

Route information
- Maintained by NYSDOT
- Length: 9.52 mi (15.32 km)
- Existed: 1930–present

Major junctions
- South end: NY 263 in Amherst
- North end: NY 31 / NY 93 north of Pendleton

Location
- Country: United States
- State: New York
- Counties: Erie, Niagara

Highway system
- New York Highways; Interstate; US; State; Reference; Parkways
| ← NY 269 | → NY 271 |

New York State Route 270 (NY 270) is a north–south state highway in western New York in the United States. It runs through rural and wooded areas of the town of Amherst in Erie County and the town of Pendleton in Niagara County. The southern terminus of the route is at an intersection with NY 263 south of the hamlet of Getzville. Its northern terminus is at a junction with NY 31 and NY 93 west of the city of Lockport. The entirety of NY 270 is known as Campbell Boulevard, named after New York State Senator William W. Campbell of the Niagara–Orleans district.

NY 270 was assigned as part of the 1930 renumbering of state highways in New York. The route once extended as far south as NY 5 and as far north as NY 104; however, it was gradually truncated to its current length as other routes were realigned or extended onto NY 270's alignment.

== Route description ==
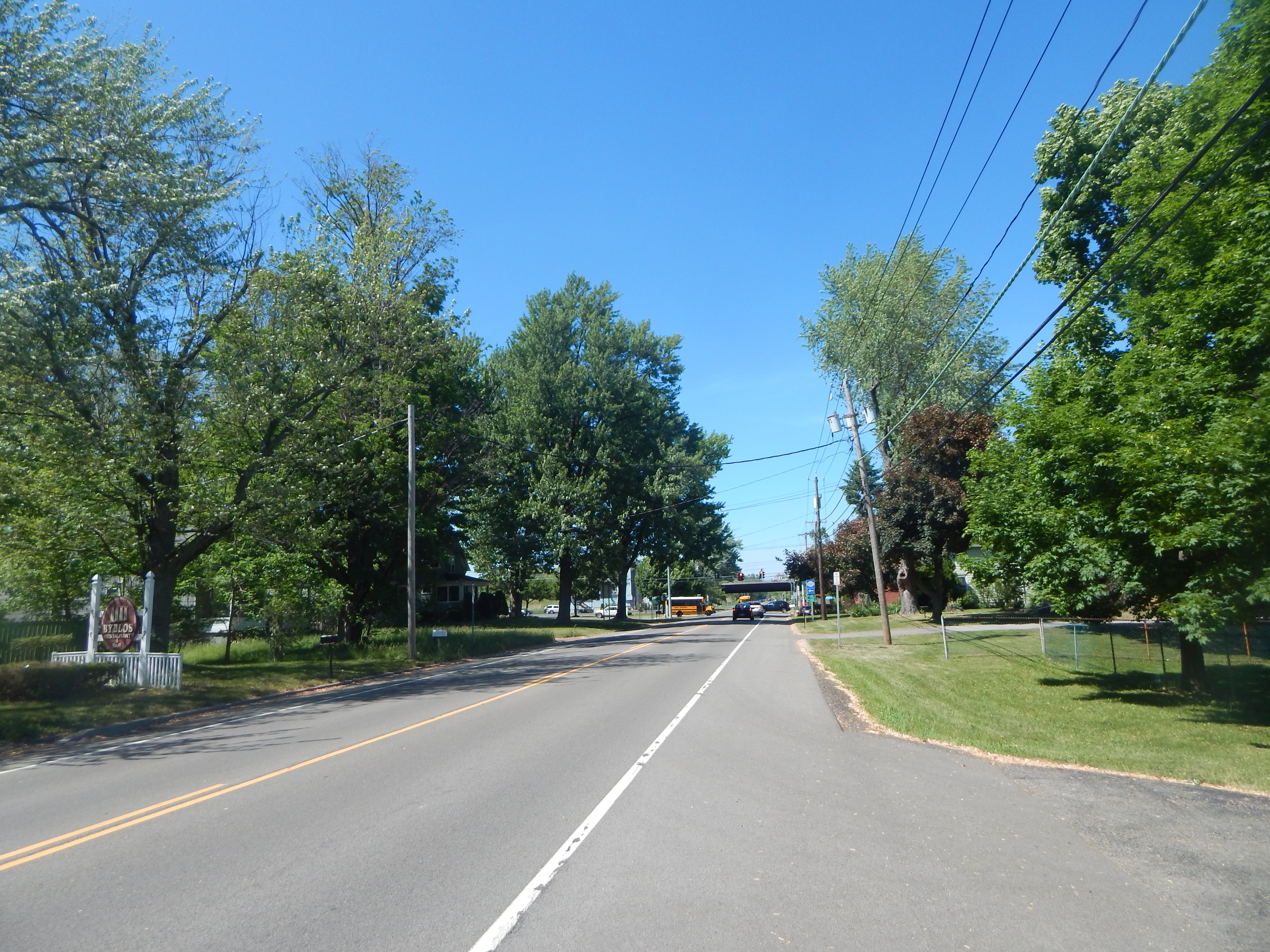
NY 270 through Getzville

NY 270 begins at an intersection with NY 263 (Millersport Highway) in the town of Amherst NY 270 proceeds north through Amherst as Campbell Boulevard, a two-lane commercial street. The route quickly becomes residential and enters the hamlet of Getzville, where it intersects with County Route 45 (CR 45; Dodge Road). After CR 45, NY 270 continues north, immediately crossing under the lanes of I-990 (Lockport Expressway). After I-990, the route continues north along Campbell Boulevard as a two-lane residential roadway through Amherst, entering an intersection with CR 299 (North French Road).

After CR 299, NY 270 bends northwest along Campbell Boulevard as the two-lane residential street through Amherst, with the residences becoming less dense as the route proceeds north. Large fields begin to surround NY 270 through Amherst as the route bends northeast into an intersection with CR 2 (Tonawanda Creek Road). Just east of that intersection is the Duane B. Rodke Memorial Athletic Field, where NY 270 crosses over Tonawanda Creek via a truss bridge. Now in the Niagara County town of Pendleton, NY 270 intersects with CR 60 (North Tonawanda Creek Road). Through Pendleton, the route remains rural, passing homes and large fields as it proceeds north.

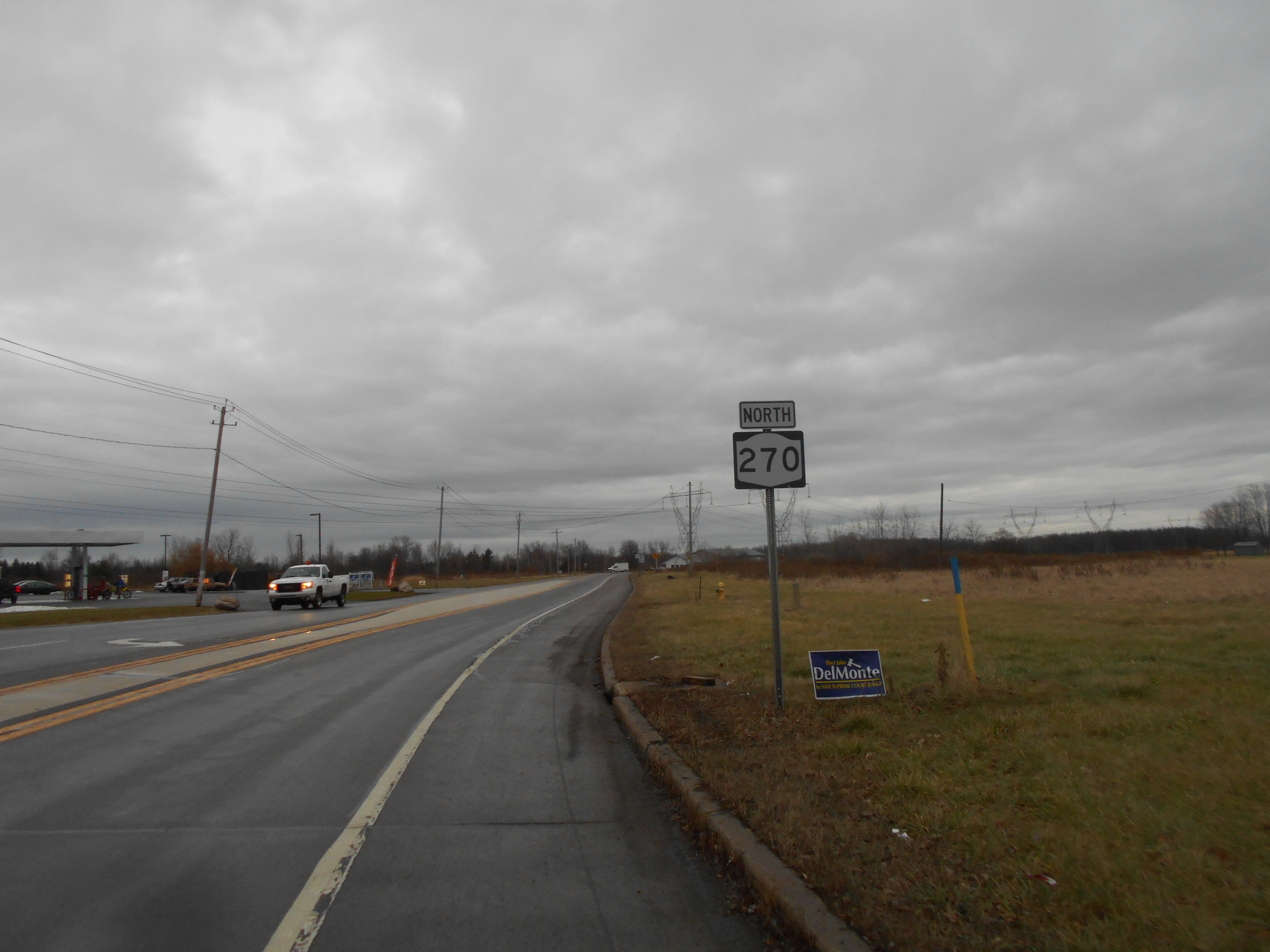
NY 270 northbound after Beach Ridge Road in Pendleton

A distance to the north, NY 270 intersects with CR 96 (Bear Ridge Road). After CR 96, the route becomes residential once again, entering the hamlet of Pendleton Center, crossing over former railroad right-of-way near Pendleton Town Park. Continuing northward, NY 270 enters the center of the hamlet, intersecting with the termini of both CR 40 (Beach Ridge Road) and CR 121 (Feigle Road) at the same intersection. After Pendleton Center, NY 270 bends northeast running along Campbell Boulevard through the town of Pendleton as a two-lane residential street. Serving the eastern terminus of CR 32 (Mapleton Road), NY 270 begins bending north, intersecting with CR 6 (Lockport Road).

Continuing northward, NY 270 enters the town of Cambria, where it intersects with NY 31 (Saunders Settlement Road) and NY 93 (Junction Road). This intersection serves as the western terminus of the NY 31/NY 93 concurrency and the northern terminus of NY 270.

== History ==
=== Designation ===
When NY 270 was assigned as part of the 1930 renumbering of state highways in New York, it began at Main Street (NY 5) in the hamlet of Eggertsville and followed Eggert Road north to Millersport Highway. Here, it turned to the northeast, utilizing what is now NY 263 to the modern campus of SUNY Buffalo. While today's Millersport Highway veers east to bypass the college, the highway originally went straight through the grounds, partially by way of what is now St. Rita's Lane. North of Ellicott Creek, NY 270 proceeded to Getzville via North Forest and Stahl Roads. At Getzville, NY 270 joined its modern alignment and followed it to Saunders Settlement Road (now NY 31), where it turned northeast onto Saunders Settlement Road for a short distance to Upper Mountain Road, where it ended at NY 3 outside of Lockport.

Both extents of NY 270 were realigned slightly by 1932. In the vicinity of Eggertsville, the route was reconfigured to follow Bailey Avenue and Grover Cleveland Highway between Main Street and Eggert Road. Near Lockport, NY 270 was shifted southward onto Hinman Road and Ohio Street. The latter change was made as part of a larger realignment of NY 3 through central Niagara County. The realignment of NY 270 near Lockport was short-lived as the route was moved back onto Campbell Boulevard c. 1935; however, it was also truncated to end at the junction of Campbell Boulevard and Saunders Settlement Road. NY 270 was truncated again in the mid-1930s after U.S. Route 62 (US 62) and NY 18 were realigned to follow Bailey Avenue between Main Street and Sheridan Drive (NY 324).

=== Truncations ===
By 1935, NY 270 was realigned to bypass North Forest and Stahl Roads by way of a new section of Millersport Highway. In the early 1940s, NY 270 was extended north over Junction Road to meet US 104 at Warrens Corners. Around the same time, NY 263 was extended southwest to Buffalo over NY 270. Initially, NY 263 overlapped with NY 270 along Millersport Highway; however, the overlap was eliminated in the late 1940s after NY 270 was truncated to begin at NY 263 in Getzville. Similarly, NY 270 initially overlapped with NY 93 along Junction Road from Lower Mountain Road to US 104. At Lower Mountain Road, NY 93 left NY 270 and proceeded east toward Lockport on Lower Mountain and Gothic Hill Roads. NY 270 was truncated to the southern end of the overlap c. 1963.

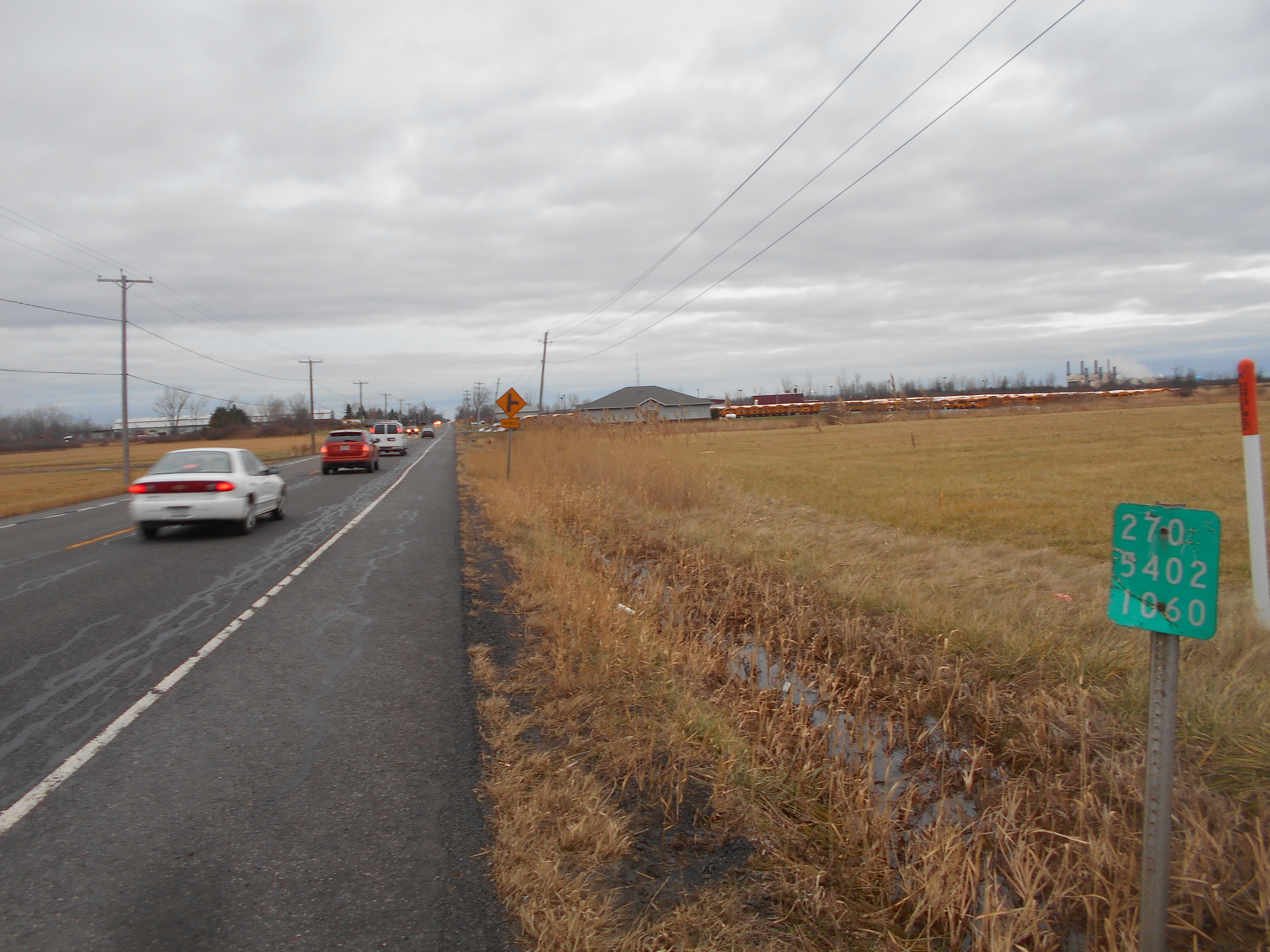
NY 270 reference marker on NY 93 in Cambria

In the late 1970s, NY 93 was realigned to use Junction and Upper Mountain Roads instead. As a result, NY 270 was cut back to its junction with Upper Mountain Road. On November 1, 2005, the Niagara County Legislature voted on a measure that, if passed, would allow the county to ask the New York State Department of Transportation (NYSDOT) to remove the NY 93 designation from Upper Mountain Road, a county-maintained highway, and reassign it to Junction Road (NY 270) and Saunders Settlement Road (NY 31). The change was intended to eliminate truck traffic on Upper Mountain Road while providing additional capacity to NY 93. This part of the agenda was passed. NYSDOT obliged to the request in 2006, rerouting NY 93 as proposed and truncating NY 270 southward to NY 31.

=== Other developments ===
On December 1, 2008, the bridge carrying NY 270 over Tonawanda Creek (also the Erie Canal) was closed to traffic to allow construction to begin on a replacement bridge over the creek. The existing bridge was built in 1941 and considered to be structurally deficient. During construction, commuter traffic was detoured onto Tonawanda Creek and Bear Ridge Roads while trucks were instructed to follow NY 263, NY 78, and NY 93 around the closed bridge. The new bridge was opened to traffic in July 2009. NY 270's intersections with Tonawanda Creek Road (Erie CR 2) and Tonawanda Creek Road North (Niagara CR 60) on the north and south approaches to the bridge were reconstructed as part of the $10.9 million project. The new bridge is similar to the former, two-lane structure; however, unlike the old one, it has wide shoulders for bicyclists and includes new sidewalks for pedestrians.

== Major intersections ==
| County | Location | mi | km | Destinations | Notes |
|---|---|---|---|---|---|
| Erie | Amherst | 0.00 | 0.00 | NY 263 (Millersport Highway) | Southern terminus |
| Erie | Amherst | 0.56 | 0.90 | CR 45 (Dodge Road) | Former eastern terminus of NY 356; hamlet of Getzville |
| Erie | Amherst | 1.29 | 2.08 | CR 299 (North French Road) to I-990 | |
| Niagara | Cambria–Lockport town line | 9.52 | 15.32 | NY 31 / NY 93 – Niagara Falls, Lockport | Northern terminus |
1.000 mi = 1.609 km; 1.000 km = 0.621 mi
