= Ransomville, New York =

- CDP
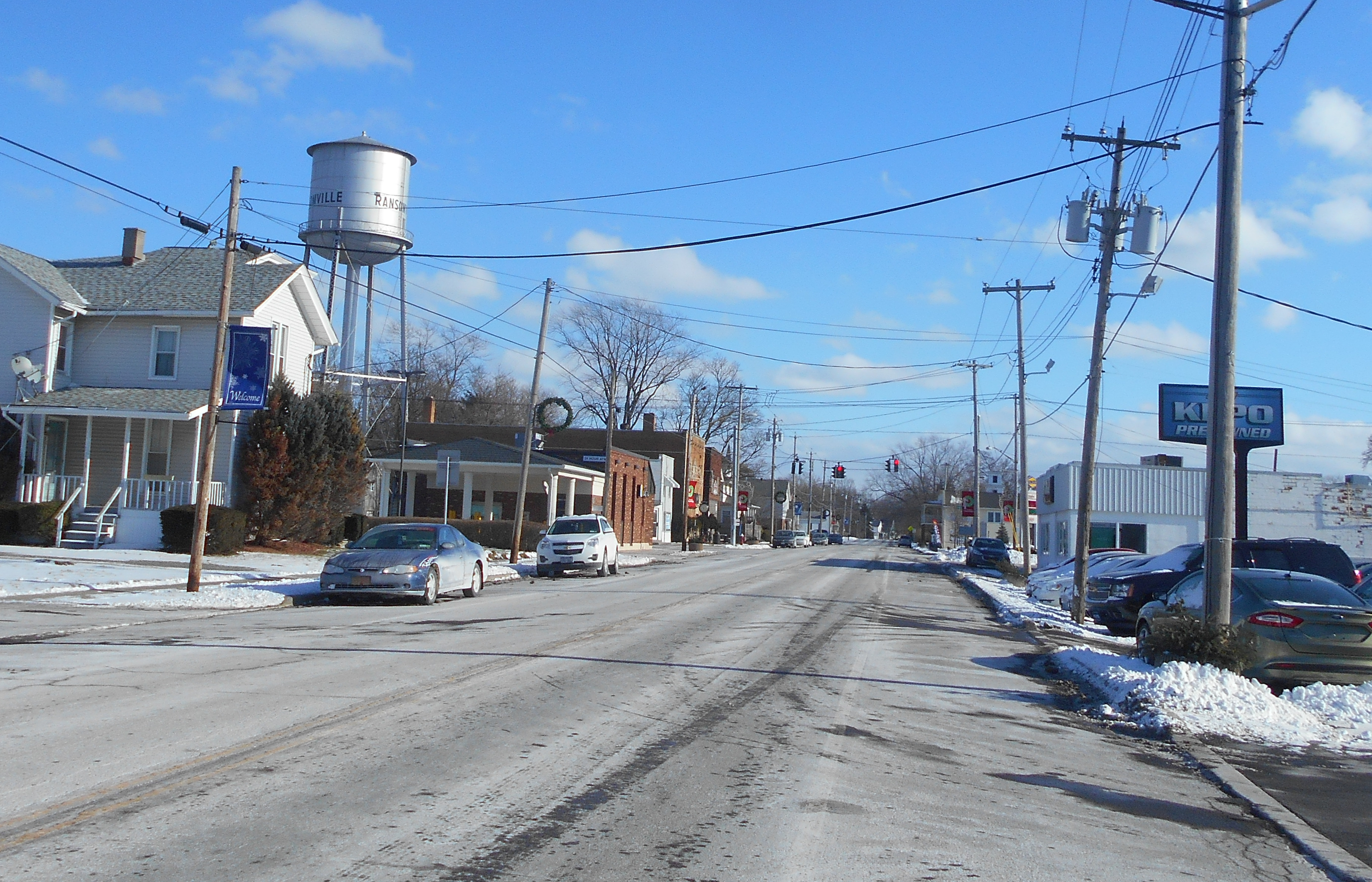
- Youngstown-Lockport Road in Ransomville
- Nicknames: Ransomtucky
- Motto: A Great Place To Grow
- Location in Niagara County and the state of New York.

- Location within New York
- Coordinates: 43°14′13″N 78°54′55″W
- Country: United States
- State: New York
- County: Niagara

Area
  - Total: 5.90 sq mi (15.29 km^{2})
  - Land: 5.90 sq mi (15.29 km^{2})
  - Water: 0 sq mi (0.00 km^{2})
- Elevation: 325 ft (99 m)

Population (2020)
  - Total: 1,316
  - Density: 222.9/sq mi (86.06/km^{2})
- Time zone: UTC-5 (Eastern (EST))
  - Summer (DST): UTC-4 (EDT)
- ZIP code: 14131
- Area code: 716
- FIPS code: 36-60598
- GNIS feature ID: 0962190
- Website: https://www.townofporter.net

Ransomville is a hamlet (and census-designated place) located in the Town of Porter in Niagara County, New York, United States. As of the 2020 census, Ransomville had a population of 1,316. Portions of the hamlet are also in Town of Wilson and Town of Cambria. Ransomville is north of the City of Niagara Falls and is part of the Buffalo–Niagara Falls Metropolitan Statistical Area.

Ransomville is in the southeast corner of the town on the Youngstown-Lockport Road (New York State Route 93).

== History ==
=== Founding ===
The town of Ransomville was established in 1842 by the Ransom and Curtiss families and was named after William Henry Harrison Ransom. The Curtiss family, led by brothers Gideon and Capt. Gilbert Curtiss, were the first to settle in the area in the 1820s, establishing the early links with neighboring towns.

The son of immigrants from Sullivan County in the Hudson River Valley, W.H.H. Ransom arrived in Niagara County in 1839 and built a farm that he worked with his wife, Elisa Estes Ransom. In 1846, Ransom purchased a general store from his uncle, Jehiel Ransom, who had been in Niagara County since 1826 and served as postmaster. Ransom had 13 children and died at the age of 74 in Ransomville on December 29, 1889.

=== Development ===
Ransomville was established as a farming community, but some of the earliest businesses were the log taverns built by Gideon Curtiss, the first of which was erected in 1817 and the second in 1825. A cemetery was laid out by 1821. In 1840 the Ransomville House was built as a larger, more refined building. In addition to the hotel, an 1860 map of the village lists two doctors and two blacksmiths, as well as a bootmaker, carriage maker, harness maker, grocer, lumber mill and general merchandise store.

Early settlers from the Curtiss family cleared and laid down the roads from Ransomville to Youngstown to the West (NY 93), along the ridge to the South (NY 104) and Lake Ontario to the North (CR 17). In 1876, The Rome, Watertown and Ogdensburg Railroad took over the Lake Ontario Shore Railroad and extended track, connecting Ransomville with Lewiston to the West and Syracuse to the East. This was later incorporated into the New York Central Railroad. A year later, Gilbert Curtiss built the Excelsior Elevator across from the rail depot. The Curtisses' agricultural business would grow to include a poultry farm that was considered the largest in the nation by the early 20th century.

In the 20th century, the town's claim to poultry fame faded with the development of new techniques and the opening of larger facilities. In 1924, the Volunteer Fire Company was formed with 24 charter members and Dr. John C. Plain as its president. A first fire hall was built in 1925 and then replaced by the current facility in 1960. Original equipment included a motorized chemical pumper rig, which replaced the hand-drawn cart. In 1933, Harold Bass opened the Bass Ford Dealership, which was soon joined by Richard Coulter's Chevrolet dealership. In 1954, Ed Ortiz and his brother opened the Ransomville Speedway for dirt track racing. The brothers moved the track outside of town to its current location in 1958.

== Geography ==
According to the United States Census Bureau, the CDP has a total area of 6.2 square miles (16 km^{2}), all land.

== Demographics ==
Historical population
Census	Pop.	Note	%±
2020	1,316		—
U.S. Decennial Census

As of the census of 2000, there were 1,488 people, 488 households, and 386 families residing in the hamlet. The population density was 240.0 inhabitants per square mile (92.7/km^{2}). There were 504 housing units at an average density of 81.3 per square mile (31.4/km^{2}). The racial makeup of the community was 97.04% White, 1.08% African American, 1.21% Native American, 0.07% Asian, 0.27% from other races, and 0.34% from two or more races. Hispanic or Latino of any race were 0.67% of the population.

There were 488 households, out of which 37.9% had children under the age of 18 living with them, 63.3% were married couples living together, 11.5% had a female householder with no husband present, and 20.7% were non-families. 17.2% of all households were made up of individuals, and 6.8% had someone living alone who was 65 years of age or older. The average household size was 2.82 and the average family size was 3.13.

In the community, the population was spread out, with 24.5% under the age of 18, 9.3% from 18 to 24, 27.2% from 25 to 44, 24.8% from 45 to 64, and 14.1% who were 65 years of age or older. The median age was 38 years. For every 100 females, there were 100.3 males. For every 100 females age 18 and over, there were 98.1 males.

The median income for a household in the village was $48,000, and the median income for a family was $53,239. Males had a median income of $30,833 versus $25,227 for females. The per capita income for the CDP was $22,063. None of the families and 2.8% of the population were living below the poverty line, including no under eighteens and 3.4% of those over 64.

== Infrastructure ==
The Ransomville Fire Company provides medical rescue, fire suppression, emergency response, and medical rescue.

== Notable people ==
- Willis W. Bradley, Medal of Honor recipient
- Chuck Hossfeld, NASCAR driver
- Charlie Rudolph, NASCAR driver
- Steve Geltz, Major League Baseball pitcher
- Steve Lewis Jr., racing driver
- Billy Quarantillo, mixed martial arts fighter
