= Streeters Corners, New York =

Hamlet in New York, United States

Coordinates: 43°12′08″N 78°49′32″W

Streeters Corners is a hamlet in the town of Cambria in Niagara County, New York, United States. Elton Streeter settled in Cambria (1897) and built a blacksmith shop at the junction of Ridge Road (Rte 104) and Cambria-Wilson Road (Rte 425). The surname Streeter appears in the "History of Cambria, New York" included in William Pool, ed. Landmarks of Niagara County, New York (Syracuse, 1897).
