= Getzville, New York =

- Hamlet
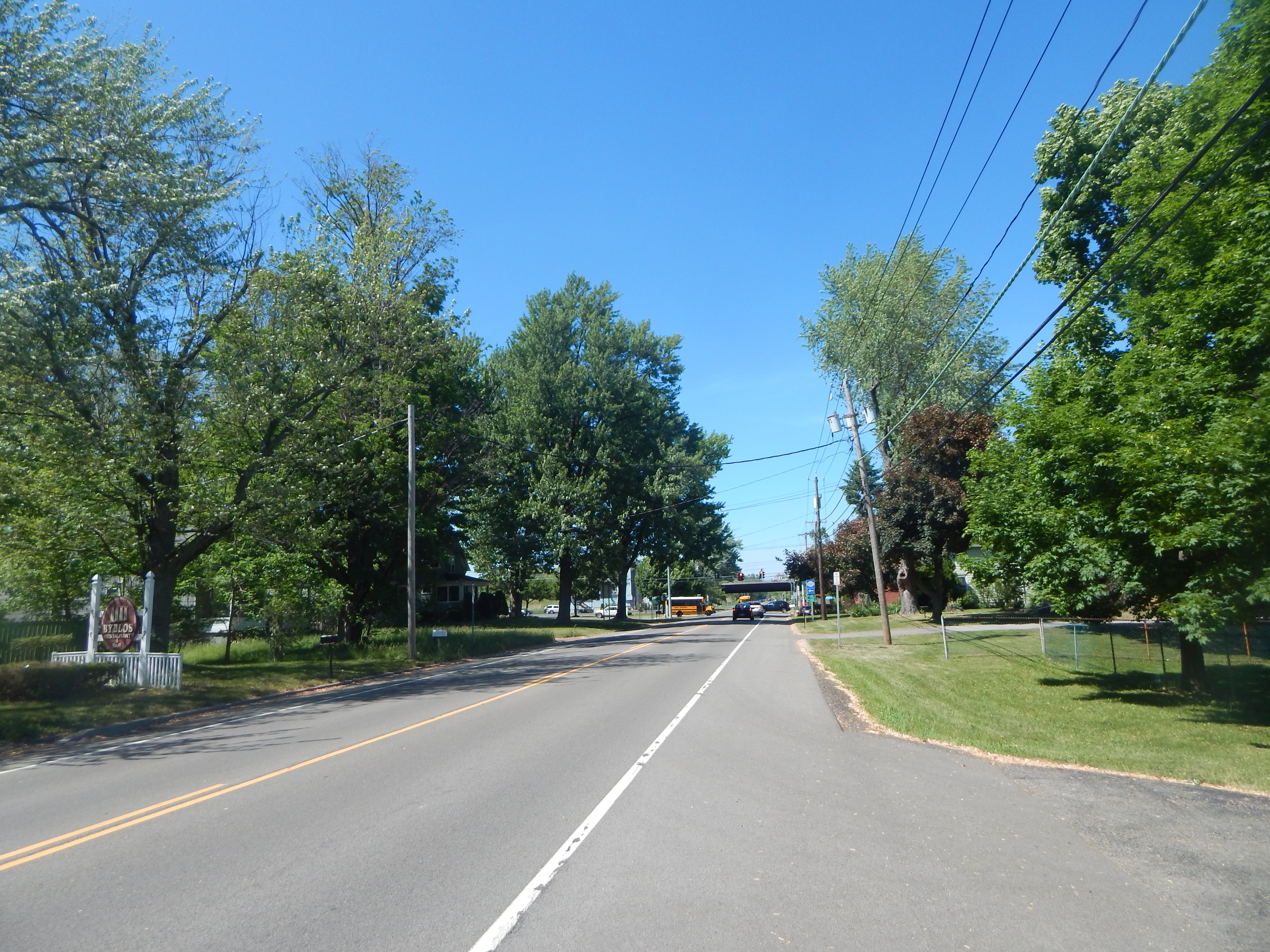
- NY 270 through the hamlet of Getzville
- Interactive map of Getzville, New York
- Coordinates: 43°01′27″N 78°46′04″W
- Country: United States
- State: New York
- County: Erie
- Town: Amherst
- Elevation: 584 ft (178 m)
- Time zone: UTC-5 (EST)
  - Summer (DST): UTC-4 (EDT)
- ZIP code: 14068
- Area code: 716

Getzville is an affluent hamlet in the town of Amherst an inner ring suburb of Buffalo in Erie County, New York, United States. Getzville's ZIP code is 14068, and its post office is located on Millersport Highway (NY 263).

== Geography ==
Getzville is located in western New York and is northeast of Buffalo.

Getzville is located centrally within the town of Amherst, the hamlet center being at the intersection of Campbell Boulevard (NY 270) and Dodge Road (CR 45).

== History ==
Getzville received its name from Joseph Goetz, who was a postmaster and owner of a copper shop and mill. The settlement grew to have a predominantly German population. By the mid 1860s many of the large farms around town were owned by German immigrants, as well as several of the shops in town. In these early days most of the residents were farmers, so the few shops in town catered to agricultural needs. In town, there was a stave factory and a cooperage, important because barrels were needed to store most foodstuffs and beverages such as cider and beer. There was also a creamery, a cider mill, a surgeon, and lumber shop.

The hamlet consisted of one main road running north–south and a center area bounded by a cross street on the north and the railroad on the south. The businesses were clustered in the center of town, with farms surrounding. New Home Road became what is today Campbell Boulevard, and Lintz Street is now Dodge Road.

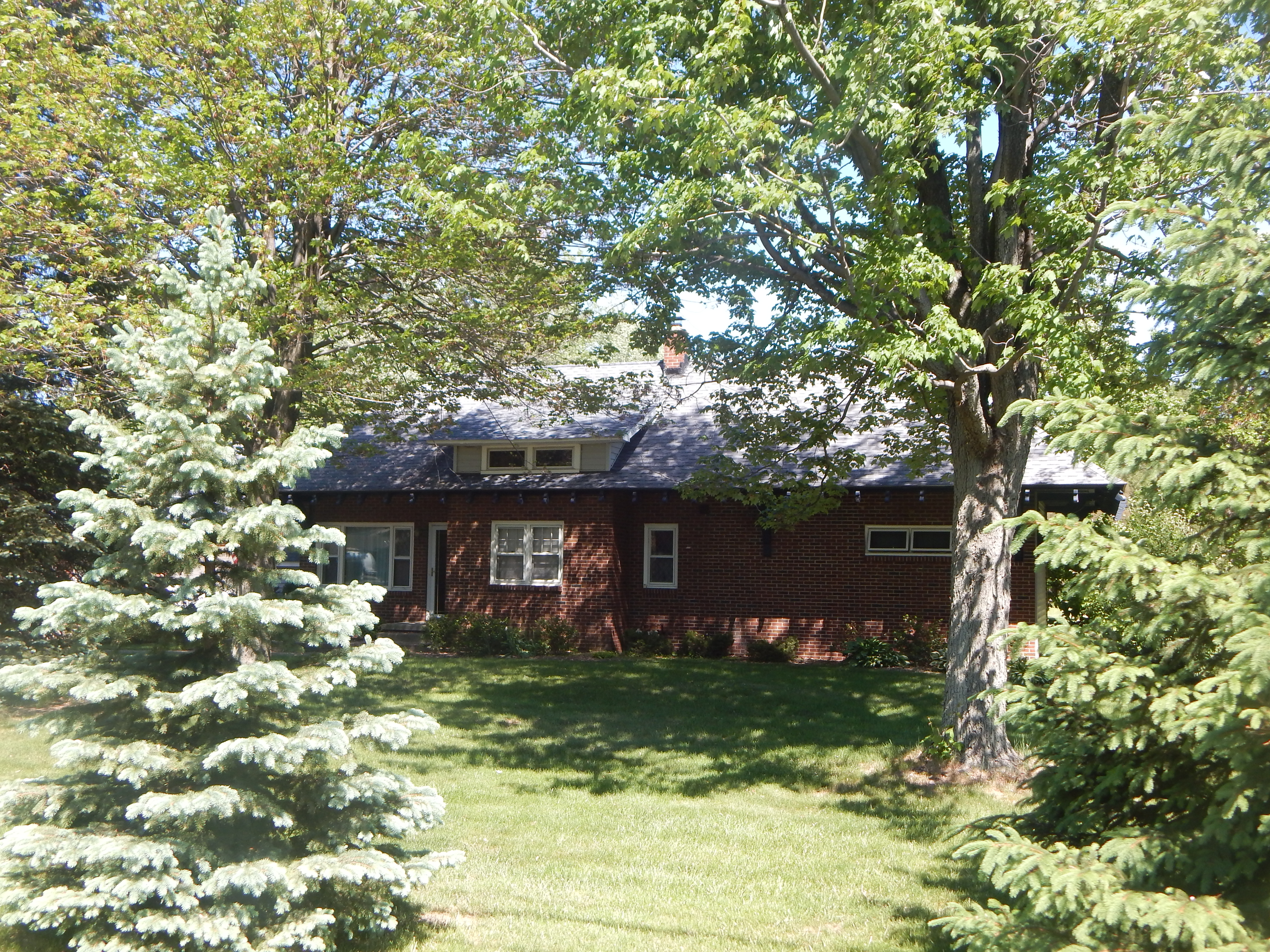
Getzville station in May 2015

In 1855, the single track of the new Canandaigua and Niagara Falls Railroad opened with a station at Getzville. This railroad became known locally as the "Peanut Line" because of its small size and relative insignificance. It was later operated by the New York Central until it was discontinued in the late 1950s.

== Schools ==
The Getzville area is served by the Williamsville Central School District. Schools in Getzville that students attend include: Dodge Elementary, Heim Elementary School, Heim Middle School, Casey Middle School and Williamsville North High School.

== Fire and police services ==
Fire protection for the Getzville area is provided by the Getzville Fire Company which operates two stations. Station One, the larger of the two, is located on the corner of Campbell Boulevard (NY 270) and Dodge Road. Station Two is located on the corner of North Forest and Heim Roads.

Since Getzville resides within the town of Amherst, it is served by the Amherst Police Department.
