= Molyneaux Corners, New York =

Hamlet in New York, United States

Coordinates: 43°12′37″N 78°47′50″W

Molyneaux Corners is a hamlet in the town of Cambria in Niagara County, New York, United States.
