= Hickory Corners, New York =

Hamlet in New York, United States

Coordinates: 43°11′08″N 78°45′14″W

Hickory Corners is a hamlet in the town of Cambria in Niagara County, New York, United States.
