= Warrens Corners, New York =

Hamlet in New York, United States

Coordinates: 43°12′58″N 78°45′17″W

Warrens Corners is a hamlet in the town of Cambria in Niagara County, New York, United States.
