= North Ridge United Methodist Church =

Historic church in New York, United States

- U.S. National Register of Historic Places
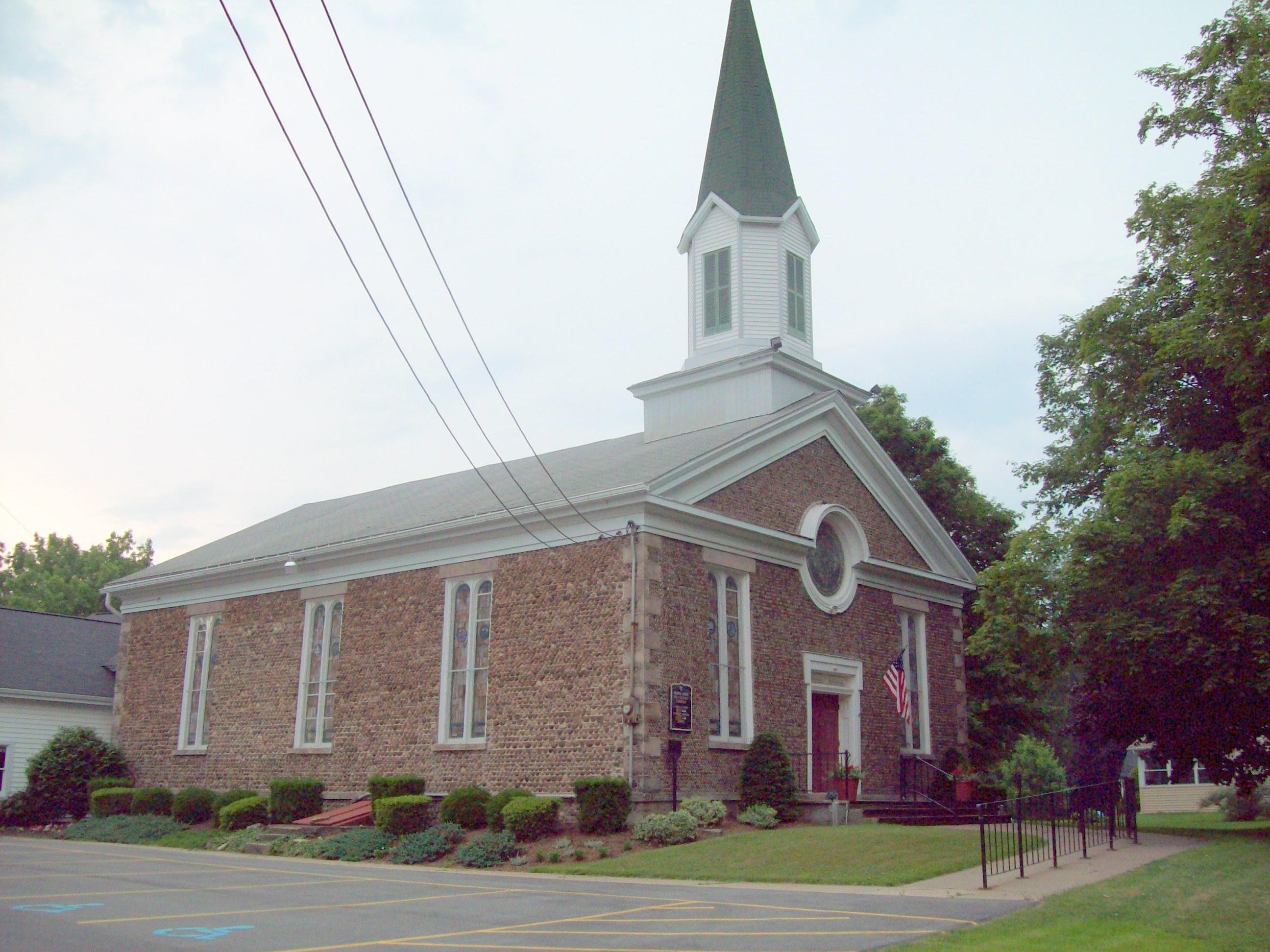
- North Ridge United Methodist Church, June 2009

- Location within New York Location within the United States
- Location: 3930 North Ridge Rd., North Ridge, New York
- Coordinates: 43°12′44″N 78°49′40″W
- Built: 1848
- Architectural style: Greek Revival
- MPS: Cobblestone Architecture of New York State MPS
- NRHP reference No.: 02001649
- Added to NRHP: December 31, 2002

North Ridge United Methodist Church is a historic United Methodist church located at North Ridge, New York in Niagara County, New York. It is a Greek Revival style cobblestone church constructed in 1848. It features mostly round, evenly colored, lake washed cobbles. It is one of approximately 47 cobblestone buildings in Niagara County.

It was listed on the National Register of Historic Places in 2002.

== Gallery ==
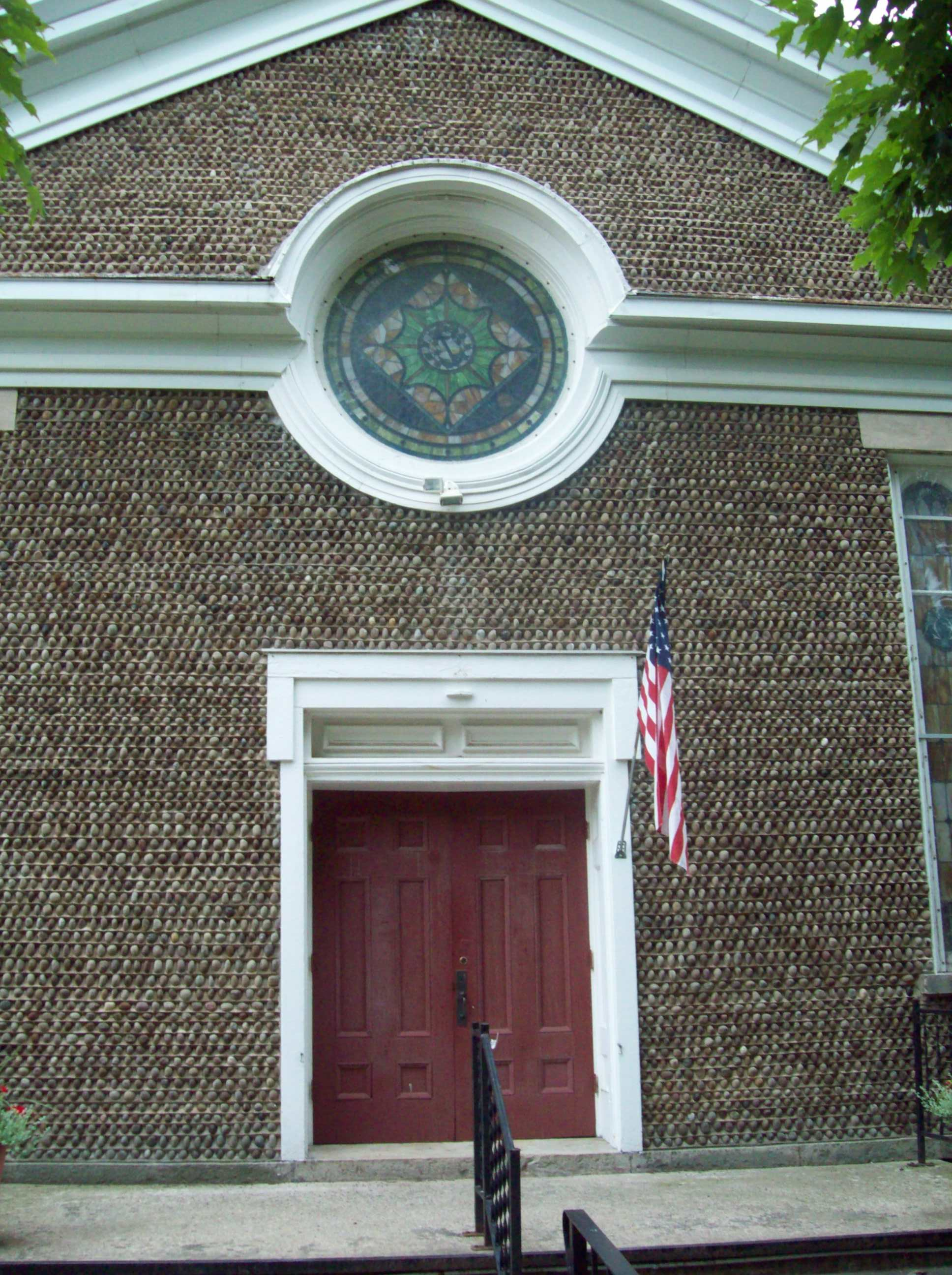
North Ridge United Methodist Church, Entry Details, June 2009
