= North Ridge, New York =

Hamlet in New York, United States

Coordinates: 43°12′45″N 78°49′33″W

North Ridge is a hamlet in the town of Cambria in Niagara County, New York, United States.

The North Ridge United Methodist Church was listed on the National Register of Historic Places in 2002.
