= Hamburg Downtown Historic District =

Historic district in New York, United States

- Hamburg Main Street Historic District
- U.S. National Register of Historic Places
- U.S. Historic district
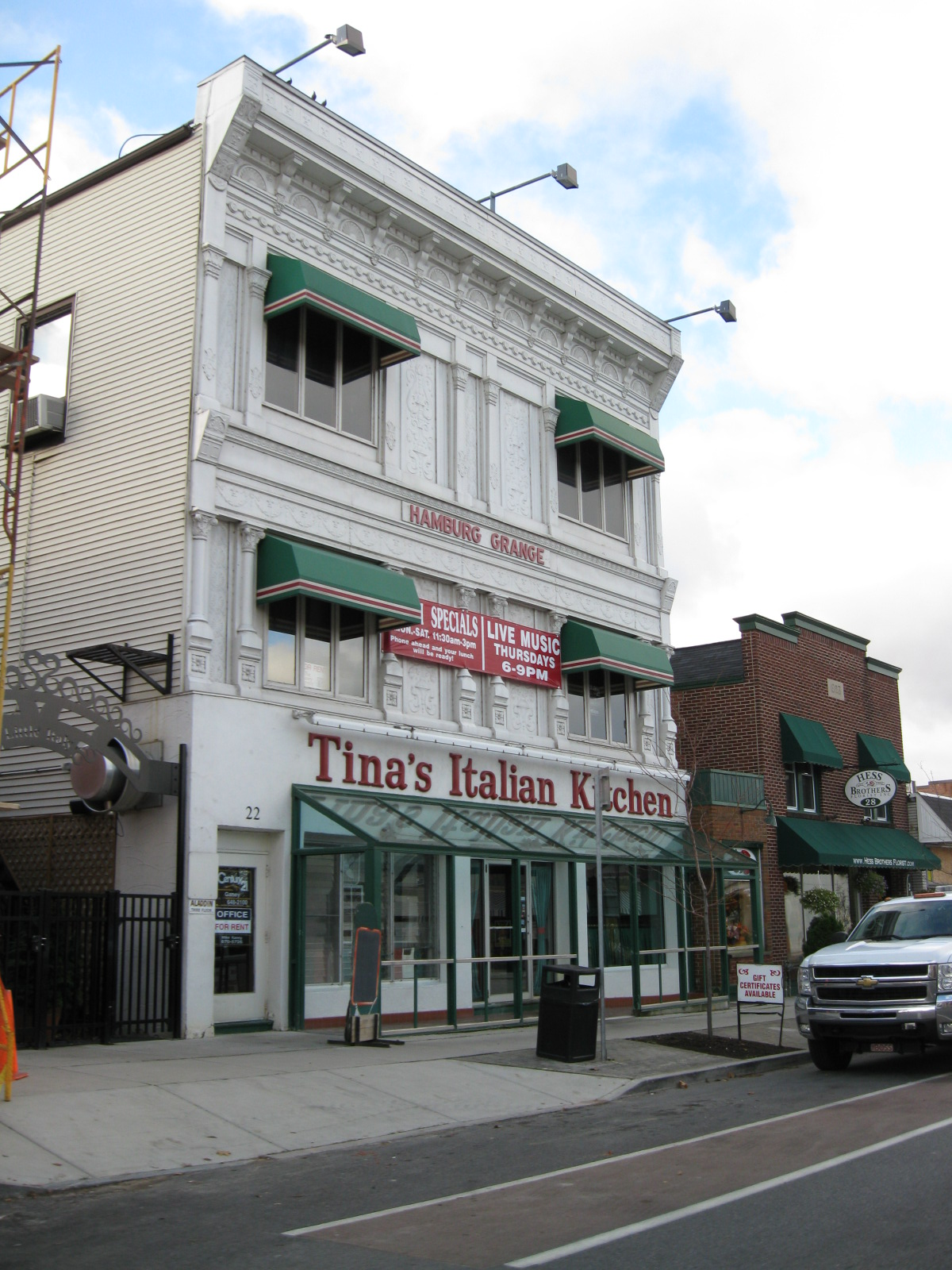
- 22 Main Street, Hamburg Main St Historic District, November 2009

- Location within New York Location within the United States
- Location: 11 through 235 Main St., Hamburg, New York
- Coordinates: 42°42′58″N 78°50′04″W
- Area: 32.6 acres (13.2 ha)
- Architectural style: Mixed
- NRHP reference No.: 12000997
- Added to NRHP: December 12, 2012

Hamburg Main Street Historic District is a national historic district located at Hamburg in Erie County, New York. The district encompasses 62 contributing buildings along two blocks along Main Street in the village of Hamburg. The district includes a variety of residential, commercial, religious, and government buildings. Notable buildings include the First Baptist Church (c. 1870), St. James United Church of Christ (1928), Hamburg Presbyterian Church (1952), Bank of Hamburgh (1907, 1967), People's Bank (1926, 1966), and the Walters Building (1917).

It was listed on the National Register of Historic Places in 2012.

== Gallery ==
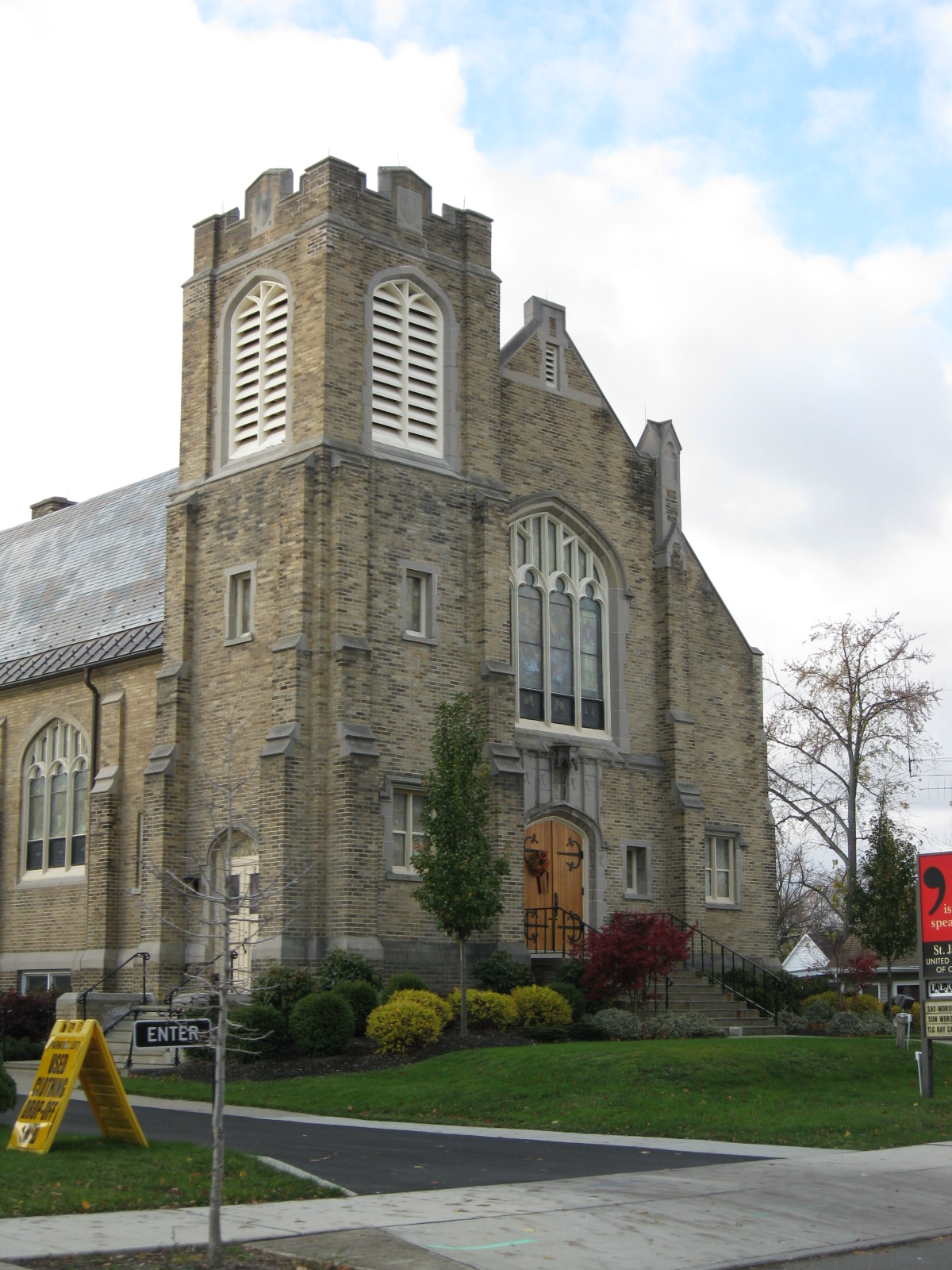
St. James United Church of Christ, Hamburg Main St Historic District, November 2009

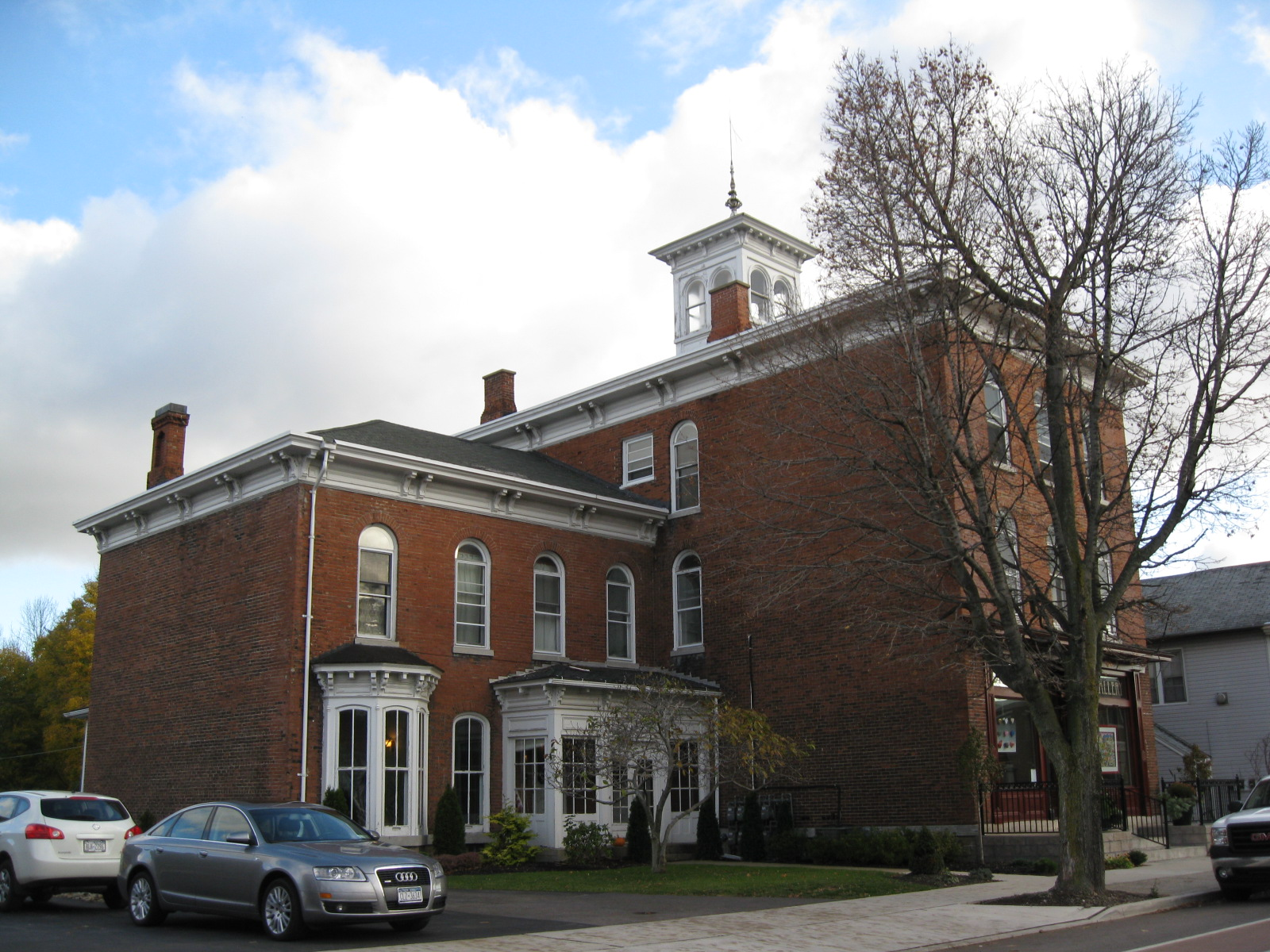
87 Main Street, Hamburg Main St Historic District, November 2009
