= List of crossings of the Niagara River =

This is a list of bridges and crossings over the Niagara River in order from Lake Erie downstream (generally northward) to Lake Ontario. Bridges and crossings marked * cross branches of the river within the United States, while those marked † cross within Canada. All others cross the full river and connect the U.S. and Canada. The endpoints of each bridge or crossing are shown in order from right to left facing downstream.

County(ies)	Crossing	Carries	Location	Coordinates
Erie-Niagara RM	Peace Bridge	Queen Elizabeth Way	Buffalo, NY – Fort Erie, ON	42°54′25.02″N 78°54′21.20″W
Erie-Niagara RM	International Railway Bridge	Canadian National Railway freight trains	Buffalo, NY – Fort Erie, ON	42°55′44.25″N 78°54′38.87″W
Erie	*South Grand Island Bridge	I-190/NY 324	Tonawanda – Grand Island, NY	42°59′55.16″N 78°56′13.02″W
Erie-Niagara	*North Grand Island Bridge	I-190	Niagara Falls – Grand Island, NY	43°04′07.70″N 78°59′26.71″W
Niagara	*American Rapids Bridge	First Street	Mainland – Goat Island (Niagara Falls, NY)	43°04′55.36″N 79°03′49.41″W
Niagara	*Three Sisters Island Footbridge	Footpath	Goat Island – Three Sisters Island (Niagara Falls, NY)	43°04′42.79″N 79°03′57.53″W
Niagara	*Goat Island Bridge	Road for Niagara Scenic Trolley (not open to cars)	Mainland – Goat Island (Niagara Falls, NY)	43°05′02.63″N 79°03′57.10″W
Niagara	*Luna Island Footbridge	Footpath	Luna Island – Goat Island (Niagara Falls, NY)	43°04′59.74″N 79°04′14.00″W
Niagara-Niagara RM	Rainbow Bridge	NY 104 (First Street)/ NY 384 (Niagara Street) – Highway 420 (Roberts Street)	Niagara Falls, NY – Niagara Falls, ON	43°05′24.87″N 79°04′03.97″W
Niagara-Niagara RM	Michigan Central Railway Bridge	Disused (was Canadian Pacific Railway)	Niagara Falls, NY – Niagara Falls, ON	43°06′30.80″N 79°03′29.76″W
Niagara-Niagara RM	Whirlpool Rapids Bridge	Road (for NEXUS users only) and Amtrak/Via passenger trains	Niagara Falls, NY – Niagara Falls, ON	43°06′33.34″N 79°03′30.14″W
Niagara RM	†Whirlpool Aero Car	Scenic cable car across Niagara Whirlpool	Niagara Parkway at Victoria Avenue, north of Niagara Falls, Ontario	43.122858°N 79.068294°W
Niagara-Niagara RM	Lewiston-Queenston Bridge	I-190 – Highway 405	Lewiston, NY – Queenston, ON	43°09′11.02″N 79°02′40.78″W

== See also ==
- Erie County
- Niagara County
- Niagara RM
