= New York State Route 266 =

State highway in Erie County, New York, US

New York State Route 266
- Map of Buffalo with NY 266 highlighted in red

Route information
- Maintained by NYSDOT and the cities of Buffalo and Tonawanda
- Length: 11.13 mi (17.91 km)
- Existed: c. 1935–present
- Tourist routes: Great Lakes Seaway Trail

Major junctions
- South end: I-190 in Buffalo
- North end: NY 265 in Tonawanda

Location
- Country: United States
- State: New York
- Counties: Erie

Highway system
- New York Highways; Interstate; US; State; Reference; Parkways
← NY 265	→ NY 267

New York State Route 266 (NY 266) is a state highway in Erie County, New York, in the United States. It runs along the Niagara River from the city of Buffalo to the city of Tonawanda. The southern terminus of the route is at the ramps leading to Interstate 190 (I-190) exit 8 in Buffalo. Its northern terminus is at an intersection with NY 265 just south of North Tonawanda in Tonawanda.

== Route description ==
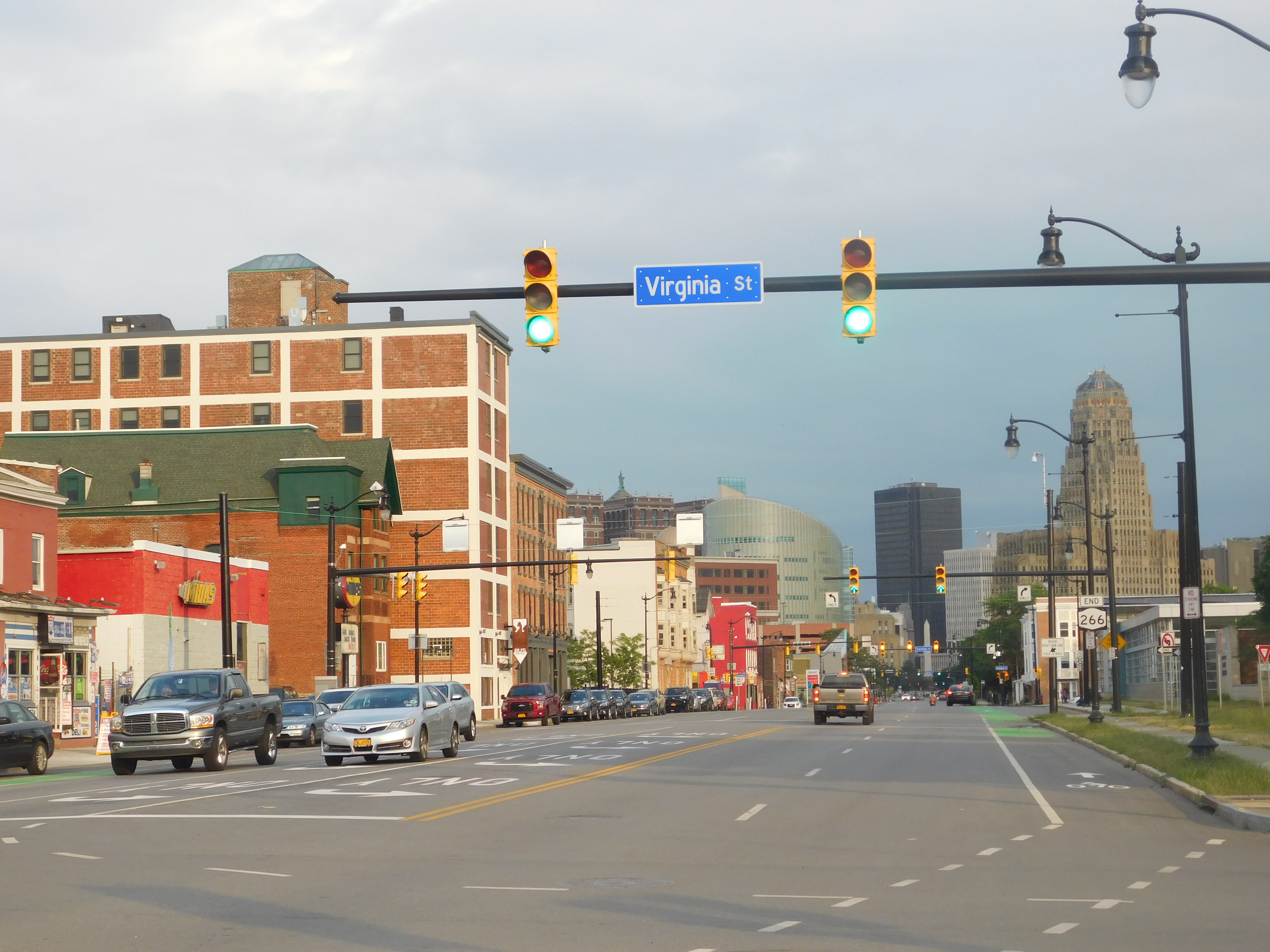
Southern terminus of NY 266 at I-190 in Buffalo

NY 266 begins at the end of the off-ramps for exit 8 of I-190 (the Niagara Thruway) in the city of Buffalo. Running northwest along Buffalo's West Side, NY 266 proceeds along Niagara Street, a two-lane commercial street through the city. Paralleling I-190 through the city, the route passes east of D'Youville College and through Prospect Park at the junction with Porter Avenue. Porter Avenue connects NY 266 to I-190's exit 9 just to the southwest. Bypassing all the entrance ramps to the Peace Bridge, NY 266 continues along the two-lane Niagara Street to a junction with Busti Avenue. At Busti, NY 266 and Niagara Street turn north, running in the shadows of I-190 near the Niagara River. A couple blocks north, the route reaches Robert Rich Way, which connects to Broderick Park and the wastewater treatment facility for Buffalo.

NY 266 continues north on the West Side of Buffalo, crossing into a large interchange with I-190, NY 198 (the Scajaquada Expressway) and the southern terminus of NY 265 (Tonawanda Street). At this interchange, NY 266 turns northwest with Niagara Street along Scajaquada Creek and parallels I-190 into the Black Rock section of Buffalo. Soon after, the ramp from exit 12 crosses NY 266 at another Tonawanda Street and exit 13 junctions at Austin Street. The route continues northeast, crossing exit 14 at Ontario Street and entering the Riverside neighborhood of Buffalo. At Crowley Avenue, the route passes southwest of St. Francis Cemetery and Riverside Cemetery. Just north of the cemetery, the route crosses into the town of Tonawanda.

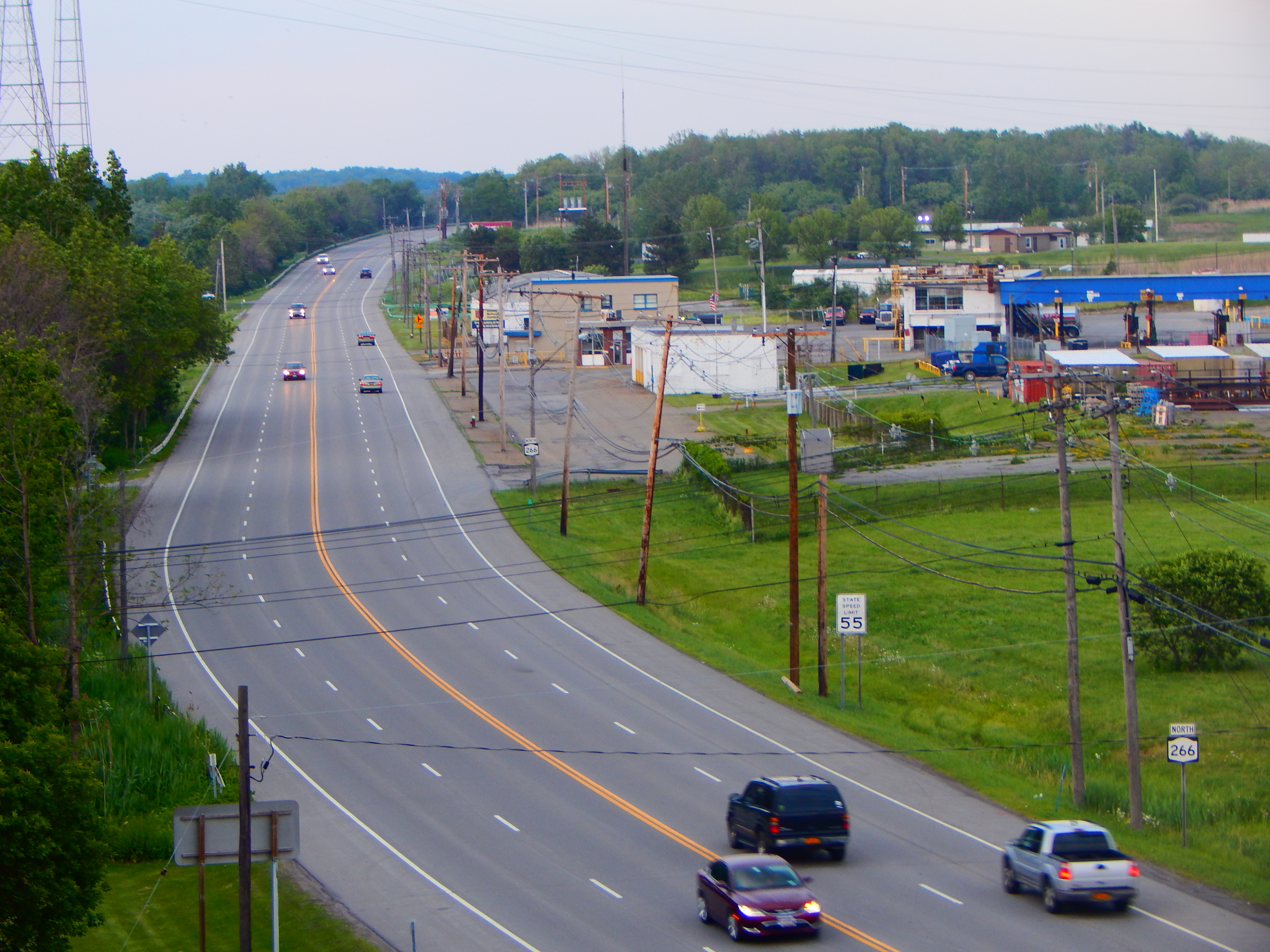
NY 266 as seen from the South Grand Island Bridge heading through Tonawanda

Passing General Motors Tonawanda Engine Plant, NY 266 is now known as River Road, crossing over I-190 and providing a ramp to the roadway. Just north of the ramp, the route comes to an intersection with the western end of NY 325 (Sheridan Drive). Passing a plant for Dunlop Rubber, NY 266 runs along the shores of the Niagara River through Tonawanda, passing multiple factories as well as the Huntley Generating Station as it bends northward along the shore. Crossing an intersection with County Route 189 (CR 189 or Grand Island Boulevard), NY 266 crosses under the South Grand Island Bridge, used by I-190 and NY 324. On the other side of a bridge, NY 266 connects to the roadway at exit 17.

Continuing along the Niagara River, NY 266 bends northeast through Tonawanda, passing south of Isle View Park and crosses over Twomile Creek. Passing Veterans Memorial Park, the route enters the city of Tonawanda, gaining the Niagara Street moniker. Becoming a two-lane park and residential street, NY 266 passes Nia-Wanda Park and soon enters the downtown section of the city at Bouck Street. Passing north of Clinton Park, the route passes south of a large commercial development along the Niagara River, reaching a junction with NY 265 (Seymour Street) near the bridge into Niagara County and the city of North Tonawanda.

== History ==
All of modern NY 266 was originally designated as part of NY 384 in the 1930 renumbering of state highways in New York. NY 384 began at Main Street (NY 5) in Buffalo and followed Niagara Street and River Road north to the city of Tonawanda, where it turned north onto modern NY 265 and proceeded across the Erie Canal into North Tonawanda. NY 266 was assigned c. 1935 to the portion of modern NY 384 between Sheridan Drive (NY 324) in the town of Tonawanda and River Road (then-NY 384) in North Tonawanda. NY 384 was realigned by the following year to follow Delaware Avenue between downtown Buffalo and North Tonawanda. The change supplanted NY 266, which was reassigned to the portion of NY 384's original, riverside routing south of NY 265 in the city of Tonawanda. The south end of the route was shifted three blocks west to Niagara Square in the 1960s after NY 5 was realigned through downtown Buffalo to serve the square. NY 266 was truncated again in the early 1970s to begin at the newly constructed ramps leading to I-190 exit 8.

== Major intersections ==
The entire route is in Erie County.

Location	mi	km	Destinations	Notes
Buffalo	0.00	0.00	I-190 / Great Lakes Seaway Trail	Southern terminus; exit 8 (I-190)
Buffalo	2.78	4.47	NY 198 (Scajaquada Expressway) / NY 265 north (Tonawanda Street)	Southern terminus of NY 265
Buffalo			I-190 south	Exit 12 (I-190)
Buffalo	3.69	5.94	I-190 south	Exit 13 (I-190)
Buffalo	4.00	6.44	I-190	Exit 14 (I-190)
Town of Tonawanda	5.58	8.98	NY 325 north (Sheridan Drive)	Southern terminus of NY 325
Town of Tonawanda	7.93– 7.97	12.76– 12.83	I-190 / NY 324 to I-290 east – Buffalo, Grand Island, Niagara Falls	Exit 17 (I-190)
City of Tonawanda	11.13	17.91	NY 265 (Seymour Street) / Great Lakes Seaway Trail	Northern terminus; former western terminus of NY 356
1.000 mi = 1.609 km; 1.000 km = 0.621 mi
