= Interstate 190 (New York) =

Highway in New York

Interstate 190
- Niagara Thruway
- I-190 highlighted in red

Route information
- Auxiliary route of I-90
- Maintained by NYSTA, NYSDOT and the Niagara Falls Bridge Commission
- Length: 28.34 mi (45.61 km)
- Existed: 1959–present
- Tourist routes: Lake Erie Circle Tour
- NHS: Entire route

Major junctions
- South end: I-90 / New York Thruway in Cheektowaga
- NY 5 in Buffalo; Peace Bridge in Buffalo; NY 198 near Black Rock; I-290 in Tonawanda; NY 324 in Grand Island; NY 384 / LaSalle Expressway / Niagara Scenic Parkway in Niagara Falls; US 62 in Niagara Falls; NY 31 in Niagara Falls; NY 104 / NY 265 / Niagara Scenic Parkway in Lewiston
- North end: Highway 405 at the Canadian border in Lewiston

Location
- Country: United States
- State: New York
- Counties: Erie, Niagara

Highway system
- Interstate Highway System; Main; Auxiliary; Suffixed; Business; Future; New York Highways; Interstate; US; State; Reference; Parkways
← NY 189	→ NY 190
← NY 90	I-90N	→ NY 91

Interstate 190 (I-190, locally known as the One-Ninety) is a north–south auxiliary Interstate Highway in the United States that connects I-90 in Buffalo, New York, with the Canada–United States border at Lewiston, New York, near Niagara Falls. Officially, I-190 from I-90 north to New York State Route 384 (NY 384) is named the Niagara Thruway and is part of the New York State Thruway system. The remainder, from NY 384 to Lewiston, is known as the Niagara Expressway and is maintained by the New York State Department of Transportation (NYSDOT).

The freeway bisects downtown Buffalo before crossing Grand Island and traveling around the outskirts of Niagara Falls before crossing the Niagara River on the Lewiston–Queenston Bridge into the Canadian province of Ontario. In Canada, the freeway continues as Ontario Highway 405, a short spur connecting with the Queen Elizabeth Way (QEW), which in turn provides a freeway connection to Toronto, Canada's largest city. The 28.34-mile-long (45.61 km) route also provides access to the QEW at the Peace Bridge between Buffalo and Fort Erie, Ontario. I-190 is currently the only three-digit interstate to connect directly with Canada, and one of only two to connect to an international border, the other being I-110 in Texas, which connects to Mexico.

Parts of the highway were built along the former right-of-ways of the Lehigh Valley Railroad and the Erie Canal. The entire route was built as part of the New York State Thruway in the late 1950s and early 1960s and was completed in 1964. The cost of I-190's construction had been paid off by 1996, and, by law, the tolls along the freeway were supposed to be removed at that point; however, this did not occur until 2006.

== Route description ==
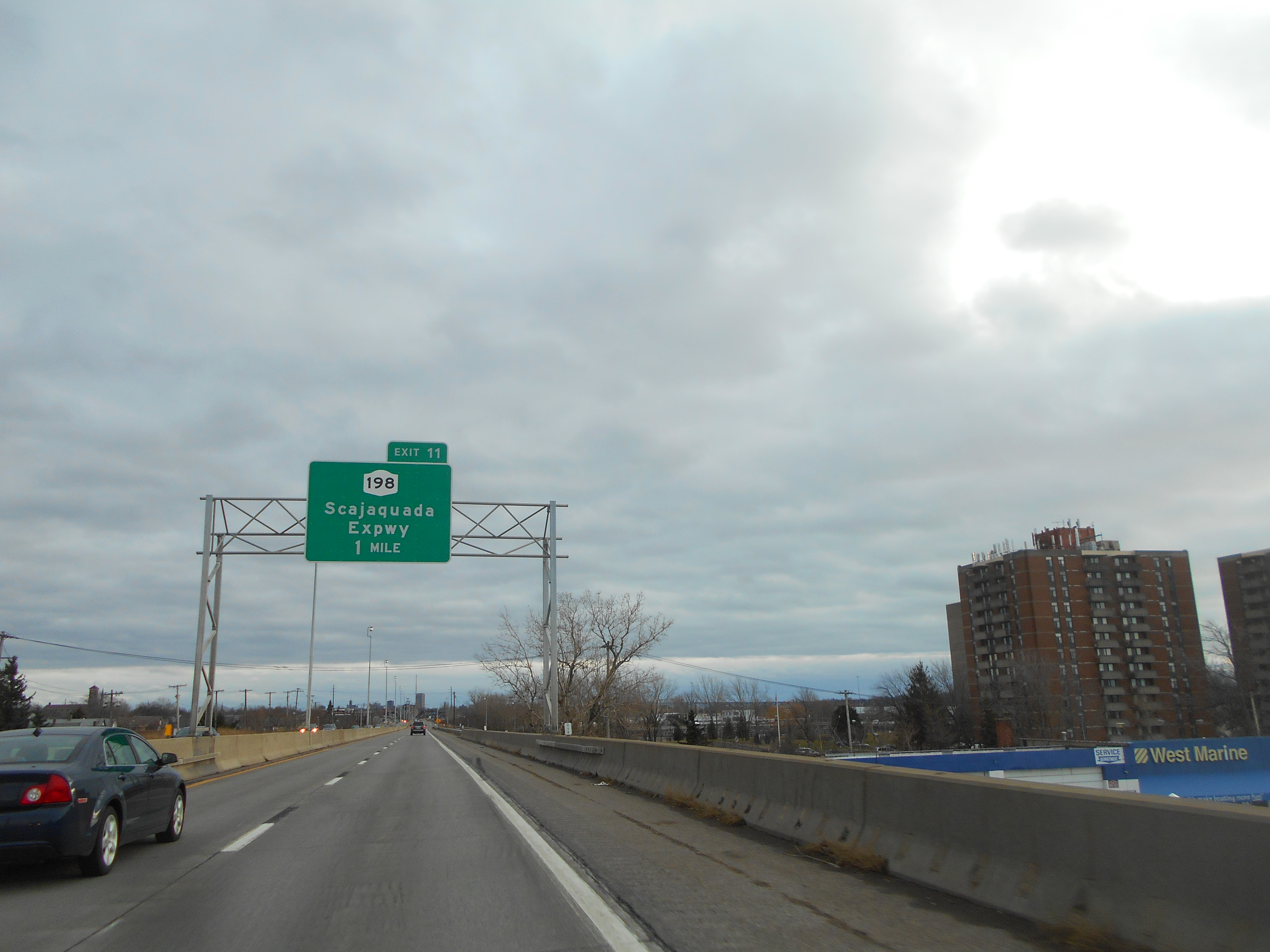
I-190 approaching exit 11 in Buffalo

I-190 begins at an interchange with the New York State Thruway (I-90) in Cheektowaga in Erie County, just north of the West Seneca town line and east of the Buffalo city line. I-190 heads west into Buffalo, passing the former location of the City Line toll barrier ahead of an interchange with South Ogden Street (exit 1). Farther west, I-190 meets NY 354 (exit 2), NY 16 (exit 3), and several local streets before entering downtown Buffalo. Within the downtown area, I-190 passes between KeyBank Center and Sahlen Field near an interchange with NY 5 (exit 7) on the shores of Lake Erie. At NY 5, I-190 turns northward to follow the path of the Niagara River. Shortly after meeting NY 266 (exit 8) immediately northwest of downtown, I-190 interchanges with Porter Avenue (exit 9), a local roadway connecting I-190 to the Peace Bridge and, thus, the QEW in Canada.

North of downtown Buffalo, I-190 follows the eastern edge of the Black Rock Channel (and passes the site of the former Black Rock toll barrier) before rejoining the banks of the Niagara near an exit with the Scajaquada Expressway (NY 198, exit 11). I-190 continues north through the northern extents of Buffalo, meeting multiple streets before separating from the Niagara and interchanging with NY 266 and NY 324 (exits 15 and 16) in quick succession. At exit 16, NY 324 joins I-190 northward through western Tonawanda. The two routes then meet I-290 and NY 266 a second time prior to crossing the Niagara River on the South Grand Island Bridge. NY 324 leaves the expressway shortly after arriving on Grand Island at exit 18.

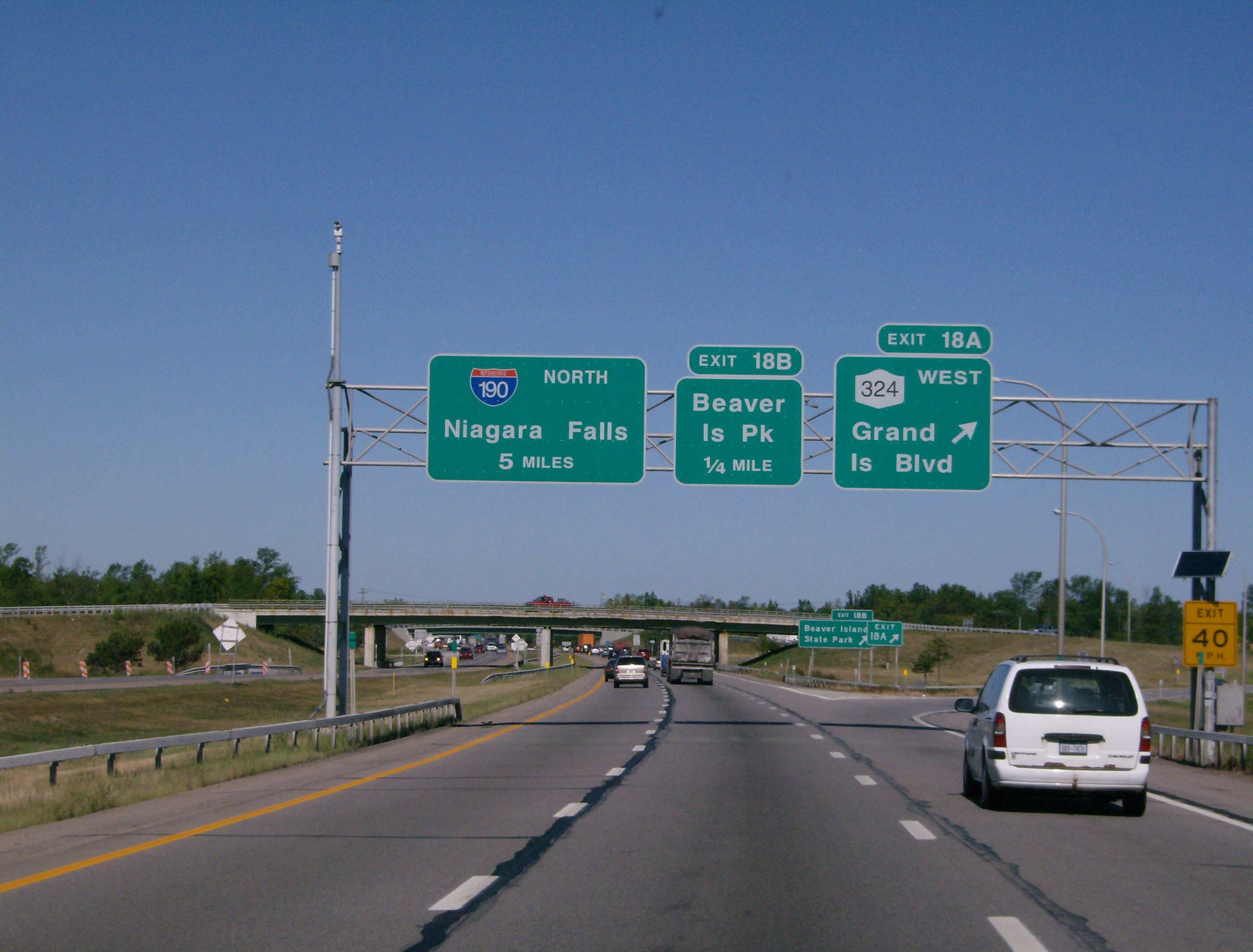
Helvetica signage for exit 18A on I-190

I-190 and NY 324 follow parallel routings across Grand Island, with both roads passing on opposite sides of Niagara Amusement Park & Splash World, a local amusement park, near the center of the island. At the northern edge of the island, NY 324, as signed, terminates at exit 20; however, officially, NY 324 rejoins I-190 across the Niagara River once again via the North Grand Island Bridge. Now in Niagara Falls, Niagara County, NY 324 ends at a complex interchange featuring NY 384, the Niagara Scenic Parkway, and the LaSalle Expressway on the eastern bank of the river. Farther north, I-190 meets US Route 62 (US 62) at exit 22 and NY 182 at exit 23.

Past NY 182, I-190 turns to the northwest, skirting the northeastern edge of Niagara Falls and roughly paralleling NY 265 to the east. In Lewiston, the expressway meets NY 31 at exit 24 southwest of the large Robert Moses Niagara Power Plant reservoir. I-190 continues onward, crossing the canal between the reservoir and the power plant on a small dam also used by NY 265. The freeway then interchanges with NY 265, the Niagara Scenic Parkway, and NY 104 at the expansive exit 25 before curving to the west and terminating at the approach to the Lewiston–Queenston Bridge. Across the bridge in Queenston, Ontario, the roadway becomes Highway 405.

== History ==
Interstate 90N
- Location: Buffalo–Lewiston
- Existed: 1957–1959

The portion of modern I-190 south of NY 384 in Niagara Falls was originally built by the New York State Thruway Authority (NYSTA) as part of the New York State Thruway system. Construction on two segments of the highway—from South Ogden Street to Porter Avenue in downtown Buffalo and from Beaver Island Parkway to West River Road on Grand Island—began in 1953. On Grand Island, construction began to connect the two existing two lane bridges on July 16, 1954. By 1955, construction had begun on the remainder of the Niagara Thruway. On July 30, 1959, the thruway was opened from the Tri-Level Interchange at I-90 to Porter Avenue and from Sheridan Drive to the southern Grand Island bridge. The remainder of the highway, with the exception of the twinned Grand Island bridges, was completed by 1964.

On August 14, 1957, the routing of what is now I-190 (including the then-partially complete Niagara Thruway) was originally designated as I-90N, as intercity routes were assigned before auxiliary Interstate numbers were applied to the shorter intracity routes. I-90N was renumbered to I-190 on February 24, 1959. Construction on the portion of I-190 north of NY 384 began c. 1962 and was completed by 1964.

In 1991, maintenance of I-84 in downstate New York was transferred from NYSDOT to the NYSTA. The monies for that purpose came from tolls levied on I-190 in downtown Buffalo. Under the laws authorizing the thruway construction, the tolls were to be removed once the original bonds used to pay for the construction were paid off, which occurred in 1996; however, the tolls would remain for 10 more years. Attorney Carl Paladino brought a lawsuit against the state in 2006 to force the removal of the tolls. On October 30, 2006, the NYSTA voted to both begin the process of returning maintenance of I-84 to NYSDOT and to remove the tolls on I-190 in Buffalo. Collection of the tolls stopped that day. Both major candidates in the 2006 New York gubernatorial election, Democrat Eliot Spitzer and Republican John Faso, had pledged to remove the tolls on I-190 if elected. While the toll barriers in Buffalo were demolished, the tolls further north on the two Grand Island bridges remained for another 12 years. They were finally replaced with electronic tolling in 2018 and have since been demolished.

== Exit list ==
County	Location	mi	km	Exit	Destinations	Notes
Erie	Cheektowaga	0.00	0.00	–	I-90 (New York Thruway) – Buffalo Airport, Albany, Erie	Southern terminus; exit 53 on I-90 / Thruway
Erie	Buffalo	0.70	1.13	1	South Ogden Street	
Erie	Buffalo	1.56	2.51	2	NY 354 (Clinton Street) to US 62 (Bailey Avenue)	
Erie	Buffalo	2.22	3.57	3	NY 16 (Seneca Street)	Southbound exit and northbound entrance
Erie	Buffalo	3.14	5.05	4	Smith Street / Fillmore Avenue	
Erie	Buffalo	3.79	6.10	5	Hamburg Street	Northbound exit and entrance
Erie	Buffalo	4.13	6.65	5	Louisiana Street	Southbound exit and entrance
Erie	Buffalo	4.99	8.03	6	Elm Street – Canalside	
Erie	Buffalo	5.10	8.21	7	NY 5 / LECT west – Buffalo Outer Harbor, Lackawanna	No northbound exit
Erie	Buffalo	5.20	8.37	7	Church Street – Buffalo Outer Harbor	No southbound exit
Erie	Buffalo	5.86	9.43	8	NY 266 north (Niagara Street)	Southern terminus of NY 266
Erie	Buffalo	6.58	10.59	9	Peace Bridge (NY 955B west) to Queen Elizabeth Way / LECT (Porter Avenue / Niagara Street) – Fort Erie, Canada	Signed for Porter Avenue southbound, Niagara Street northbound
Erie	Buffalo	8.69	13.99	11	NY 198 east (Scajaquada Expressway)	Western terminus of NY 198
Erie	Buffalo	9.18	14.77	12	NY 266 / Amherst Street	Northbound exit and southbound entrance; NY 266 not signed
Erie	Buffalo	9.44	15.19	13	NY 266 / Austin Street	Northbound exit and southbound entrance; NY 266 not signed
Erie	Buffalo	9.88	15.90	14	Ontario Street	Southbound exit and northbound entrance
Erie	Buffalo	10.50	16.90	14	To Vulcan Street	Northbound exit and southbound entrance; access via NY 266
Erie	Town of Tonawanda	12.36	19.89	15	NY 324 east / Sheridan Drive (NY 325 east) / Kenmore Avenue	Southern end of NY 324 concurrency
Erie	Town of Tonawanda	13.33	21.45	16	I-290 east to I-90 / New York Thruway – Rochester, Tonawanda	Western terminus of I-290
Erie	Town of Tonawanda	14.20	22.85	17	NY 266 (River Road) – North Tonawanda, Tonawanda	Signed as the "Tonawandas" on guide signs
Erie	Niagara River	14.50– 14.90	23.34– 23.98	South Grand Island Bridge (northbound toll; E-ZPass or Toll by Mail)		
Erie	Grand Island	15.35	24.70	18A	NY 324 west (Grand Island Boulevard)	Northern end of NY 324 concurrency; northbound exit and southbound entrance
Erie	Grand Island	15.46	24.88	18B	Beaver Island State Park	Signed as exit 18 southbound
Erie	Grand Island	17.27	27.79	19	Whitehaven Road	
Erie	Grand Island	19.32	31.09	20B	NY 324 east (Grand Island Boulevard) / Long Road	Signed as exit 20 northbound; southern end of NY 324 concurrency
Erie	Grand Island	19.69	31.69	20A	West River Road	No northbound exit
Niagara River		20.32– 21.12	32.70– 33.99	North Grand Island Bridge (southbound toll; E-ZPass or Toll by Mail)		
Niagara	Niagara Falls	21.14	34.02	21	NY 384 (Buffalo Avenue) / Niagara Scenic Parkway north – Niagara Falls NY 324 ends	Northern terminus of NY 324; Niagara Parkway not signed southbound
Niagara	Niagara Falls	21.24	34.18	Transition between Niagara Thruway and Niagara Expressway		
Niagara	Niagara Falls	21.53	34.65	21A	LaSalle Expressway east – North Tonawanda, Tonawanda	Signed as the "Tonawandas" on guide signs
Niagara	Niagara Falls	22.08	35.53	22	US 62 (Niagara Falls Boulevard) – Niagara Falls International Airport	
Niagara	Niagara	23.74	38.21	23	NY 182 (Packard Road / Porter Road)	
Niagara	Niagara	25.87	41.63	24	NY 31 (Witmer Road)	
Niagara	Town of Lewiston	27.72	44.61	25	NY 104 / NY 265 / Niagara Scenic Parkway – Lewiston	Signed as exits 25A (NY 265) and 25B (NY 104/Niagara) northbound; no southbound access to NY 265
Niagara River		28.34	45.61	Lewiston–Queenston Bridge; Canada–US border		
Niagara River		28.34	45.61	–	Highway 405 west – St. Catharines, Hamilton, Toronto	Continuation into Ontario
1.000 mi = 1.609 km; 1.000 km = 0.621 mi: Concurrency terminus; Electronic toll collection; Incomplete access; Route transition

== See also ==
- LaSalle Expressway
- Niagara Scenic Parkway
