= South Grand Island Bridge =

Bridge in New York

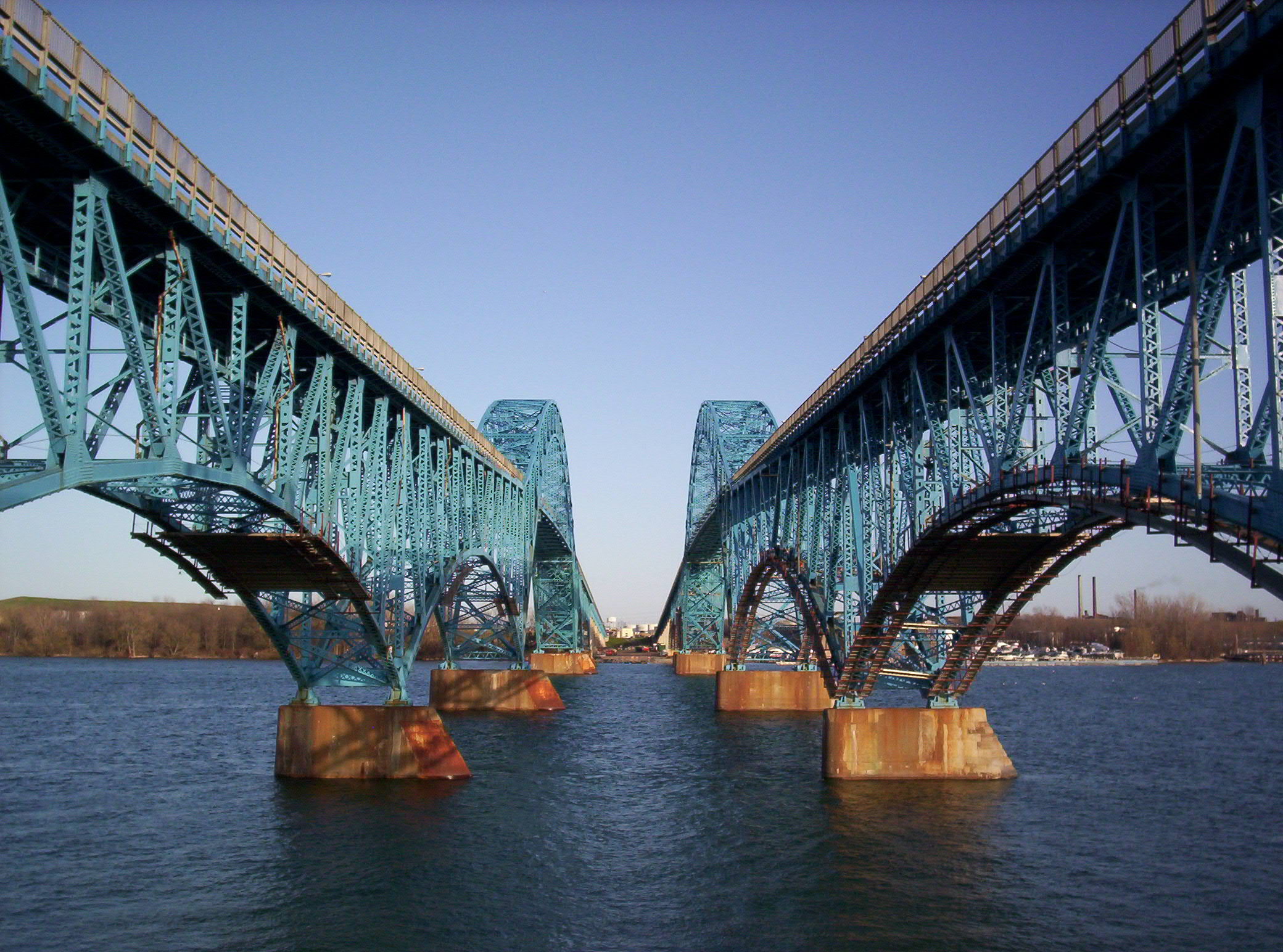
- South Grand Island Bridge from Grand Island (from northwest; Niagara River flows left, northeast)
- Coordinates: 42°59′54″N 78°56′14″W
- Carries: 4 lanes of I-190 / NY 324
- Crosses: Niagara River
- Locale: Tonawanda, New York and Grand Island, New York
- Maintained by: New York State Thruway Authority

Characteristics
- Design: Twin truss through arch bridges
- Total length: 3,400 feet (1,036 m)
- Longest span: 600 feet (183 m)
- Clearance below: 93 feet (28 m)

History
- Opened: July 15, 1935 (southbound span); October 11, 1962 (northbound span)

Statistics
- Daily traffic: 68,789
- Toll: Northbound Only (Electronic Tolling); $1.75 - Tolls by Mail; $1.75 - E-ZPass (Out of State); $1.00 - E-ZPass (New York)

Location
- Interactive map of South Grand Island Bridge

The South Grand Island Bridge is a pair of twin two-lane truss arch bridges spanning the Niagara River between Tonawanda and Grand Island in New York, United States. Each bridge carries one direction of Interstate 190 (I-190) and New York State Route 324 (NY 324). Both crossings are operated by the New York State Thruway Authority as part of the Niagara Thruway. The southbound span was opened in 1935 and acquired by the State of New York in 1950. The northbound span was finished in 1962. A northbound-only toll is collected via Electronic Tolling.

== Description ==
The bridges are twin truss arch bridges with a steel through-arch in the middle. Both crossings have a 93-foot (28 m) navigation clearance, which was designed to allow tall lake freighters and tanker ships to pass beneath it.

A northbound-only toll is presently collected via open-road cashless tolling. The open-road tolling began operating on March 29, 2018, replacing conventional toll booths. The tollbooths were dismantled, and drivers are no longer able to pay cash at the bridge. Instead, drivers will travel beneath an overhead gantry where their E-ZPass transponder will be detected and charged. Drivers without an E-ZPass will have a picture of their license plate taken, and the toll will be mailed to them.

== History ==
The southbound bridge was completed on July 15, 1935 as a two-lane, two-way structure carrying NY 325 from Tonawanda to Grand Island. Mr. Frank J. Offermann Sr., the former Sheriff of Erie County, owner of the Buffalo Bisons baseball club and prominent resident of Grand Island was active in getting the bridges sanctioned. Also in 1935 after his untimely death, Supervisor John Messmer proposed changing the name of the boulevard connecting the Grand Island Bridges to Offermann Drive; however this was never done. It became part of NY 324 by 1937. In 1950, the State of New York assumed ownership of the bridge as part of the Niagara Thruway's construction. A twin bridge erected to the northeast of the original structure was opened on October 11, 1962, at which time all northbound traffic was moved onto the new crossing and the 1935 span became southbound-only.

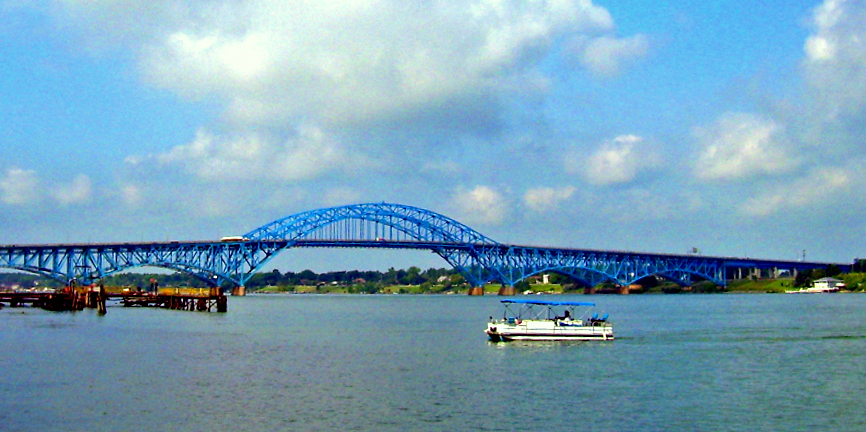
South Grand Island Bridge from Isle View Park in Tonawanda (view upstream, from northeast) The 1935 span that now carries southbound traffic is behind the 1962 northbound span.

While the twin bridges were built decades apart, they appear nearly identical. It is clear that builders in the 1960s took great care in matching the original 1930s architecture, but there are slight differences. The 1935 bridge has stone cutwaters on the piers, while the 1962 bridge has steel-faced cutwaters. Also, renovations of the southbound bridge have created a guard rail that looks quite different from the one on the northbound bridge.

The northbound span was renovated by American Bridge Company from 2008 to 2010. American Bridge Company replaced the deck (road), sidewalk, and barriers as part of a $48 million project.

In August 2019, for a duration of 13 hours, the bridges were closed to the public to be used as a filming site for A Quiet Place Part II.

== See also ==
- List of crossings of the Niagara River
- North Grand Island Bridge
