= LaSalle Expressway =

LaSalle Expressway
- LaSalle Expressway highlighted in red

Route information
- Length: 2.62 mi (4.22 km)
- Existed: early 1970s–present

Major junctions
- West end: I-190 / NY 324 / Niagara Scenic Parkway in Niagara Falls
- East end: NY 265 / NY 384 in Wheatfield

Location
- Country: United States
- State: New York
- Counties: Niagara

Highway system
- New York Highways; Interstate; US; State; Reference; Parkways

The LaSalle Expressway (also known as the LaSalle Arterial) is a 2.62-mile-long (4.22 km) freeway in Niagara County, New York, in the United States. It begins near the North Grand Island Bridge at an interchange with Interstate 190 (I-190) in Niagara Falls and ends just south of the Niagara Falls International Airport at Williams Road (NY 952V) in Wheatfield. The LaSalle Expressway is part of New York State Route 951A (NY 951A), an unsigned reference route; the other, 0.42-mile (0.68 km) portion is located along Niagara Street between the Rainbow Bridge and Fifth Street in downtown Niagara Falls. Most of this portion, which is not connected to the LaSalle Expressway, is also part of the signed NY 384.

There are two lanes in each direction of the expressway, separated by a grassy median strip. Currently, only three exits exist on the expressway; however, the LaSalle was originally proposed as part of the Belt Expressway for the Buffalo–Niagara Falls area, stretching from the Rainbow Bridge in Niagara Falls south to Blasdell. The Milestrip Expressway (part of NY 179) in Blasdell and the LaSalle Expressway are the only portions of the loop that were constructed. The LaSalle Expressway was built over an old railroad grade in the 1960s and opened to traffic by 1971. Near its current eastern terminus, the LaSalle Expressway passes directly south of the Love Canal neighborhood.

== Route description ==
The LaSalle Expressway begins at a trumpet interchange with I-190 in eastern Niagara Falls. It heads east from the junction as a four-lane freeway, passing through a predominantly residential area of the city. Not far from I-190, the highway connects to a spur leading south to the east end of the Niagara Scenic Parkway, which serves as a riverside connector between the LaSalle Expressway and downtown Niagara Falls. The LaSalle continues on, connecting to 77th Street by way of a diamond interchange and Cayuga Drive with a partial diamond interchange before crossing over Cayuga Creek. About a quarter-mile (0.4 km) from the creek, the neighborhoods that had lined the highway abruptly end as the LaSalle Expressway passes through the remnants of the abandoned Love Canal neighborhood.

At the eastern edge of the neighborhood, the expressway's four lanes narrow to two as the highway crosses into Wheatfield and follows what had intended to be exit ramps to an intersection with Williams Road (unsigned NY 952V) in a mostly commercial area of the town. The LaSalle Expressway ends here, with Williams Road providing access to NY 265 and NY 384 to the south and U.S. Route 62 (US 62) and the Niagara Falls International Airport in the north. A pair of stubs exist at the point where the expressway narrows to two lanes, a remnant of the original plans to continue the highway further eastward.

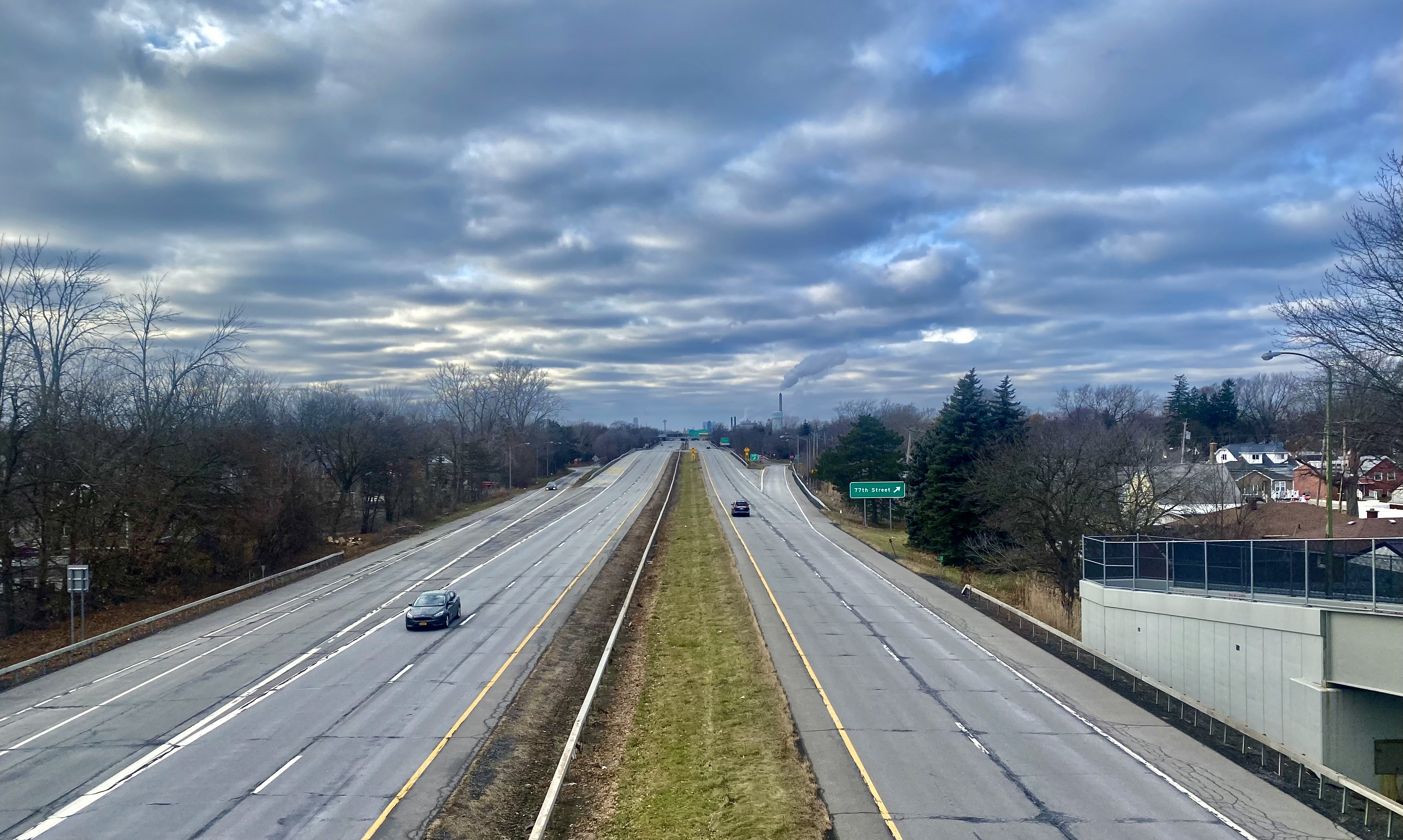
Looking west from atop the 81st Street pedestrian bridge in December 2022

== History ==
The right-of-way of the built portion of the LaSalle Expressway was once occupied by the International Railway Company's Buffalo–Niagara Falls High Speed Line, an interurban line that connected Buffalo with North Tonawanda and Niagara Falls. It was completed in 1918, but abandoned in 1937 as a result of low ridership. In the vicinity of Niagara Falls, the interurban ran adjacent to the former Buffalo and Niagara Falls Railroad line operated by the New York Central Railroad and the parallel Niagara Falls branch of the Erie Railroad. At some point between 1950 and 1965, both railroads constructed an easterly bypass of the city that left the original lines about 1 mile (1.6 km) east of Williams Road. The old tracks leading directly into Niagara Falls were subsequently abandoned.

Plans to build a freeway along the old railroad right-of-way date as far back as the early 1950s, when a proposed connector between the Niagara Thruway (now I-190) and the Rainbow Bridge was first marked on maps of the area. The proposed highway was eventually included in plans for the Belt Expressway, a freeway encircling the Buffalo suburbs from Blasdell in the south to downtown Niagara Falls in the north. The LaSalle Expressway portion of the highway would have extended from the Rainbow Bridge to US 62 in North Tonawanda. Construction of the segment between I-190 and Williams Road began in the mid-1960s and was completed by 1971.

Most of the Belt Expressway was never built. Only two parts of the road were constructed: the LaSalle Expressway and the Milestrip Expressway, part of NY 179, in Blasdell. The 0.42-mile (0.68 km) portion of Niagara Street in downtown Niagara Falls from the Rainbow Bridge to its junction with Fifth Street lies in the LaSalle's proposed right-of-way and is designated as part of NY 951A, the New York State Department of Transportation's unsigned reference route designation for the LaSalle Expressway. In 2007, all of the western portion of NY 951A east of Rainbow Boulevard became co-designated with the signed NY 384, which had been rerouted through the city. However, NY 951A's western segment still continues to Fifth Street as of 2008. In late 2011, an extension of the LaSalle Expressway past its western terminus at I-190 was mentioned by Niagara Falls Mayor Paul Dyster as a potential long-term solution to improve safety at the junction of I-190 and US 62.

The construction of the LaSalle Expressway indirectly contributed to the Love Canal disaster. When the freeway was built along the southern edge of the neighborhood in the 1960s, it prevented the contaminated groundwater inside the former canal from escaping into the Niagara River. The trapped toxic water was then forced to the surface after the water table rose substantially following a 1977 blizzard.

== Exit list ==
The entire route is in Niagara County. All exits are unnumbered.

Location	mi	km	Destinations	Notes
Niagara Falls	0.00	0.00	I-190 (NY 324 east) – Buffalo, Lewiston	Western terminus; exit 21A on I-190
Niagara Falls	0.27	0.43	Niagara Scenic Parkway north	Westbound exit and eastbound entrance; southern terminus of Niagara Scenic Parkway
Niagara Falls	0.74	1.19	77th Street	
Niagara Falls	1.50	2.41	NY 265 (Cayuga Drive) / NY 384 (Buffalo Avenue)	Eastbound exit and westbound entrance
Wheatfield	2.62	4.22	NY 265 / NY 384	Eastern terminus; at-grade intersection; access via NY 952V
1.000 mi = 1.609 km; 1.000 km = 0.621 mi: Incomplete access

== See also ==
- New York State Route 179, the only other part of the Belt Expressway that was constructed
