= New York State Route 198 =

Highway in Buffalo, New York

New York State Route 198
- Scajaquada Expressway
- Map of Buffalo with NY 198 highlighted in red

Route information
- Maintained by NYSDOT
- Length: 3.59 mi (5.78 km)
- Existed: 1962–present

Major junctions
- West end: I-190 in Buffalo
- NY 5 in Buffalo
- East end: NY 33 in Buffalo

Location
- Country: United States
- State: New York
- Counties: Erie

Highway system
- New York Highways; Interstate; US; State; Reference; Parkways
← NY 197	→ NY 199

New York State Route 198 (NY 198) is an expressway located entirely within the city of Buffalo, New York, in the United States. It is named the Scajaquada Expressway (/skəˈdʒækwədə/ skə-JA-kwə-də) for Scajaquada Creek, which it covers as it heads across northern Buffalo. NY 198 connects the Niagara Thruway (Interstate 190) in the Black Rock neighborhood to the Kensington Expressway (NY 33) on Buffalo's east side.

== Route description ==
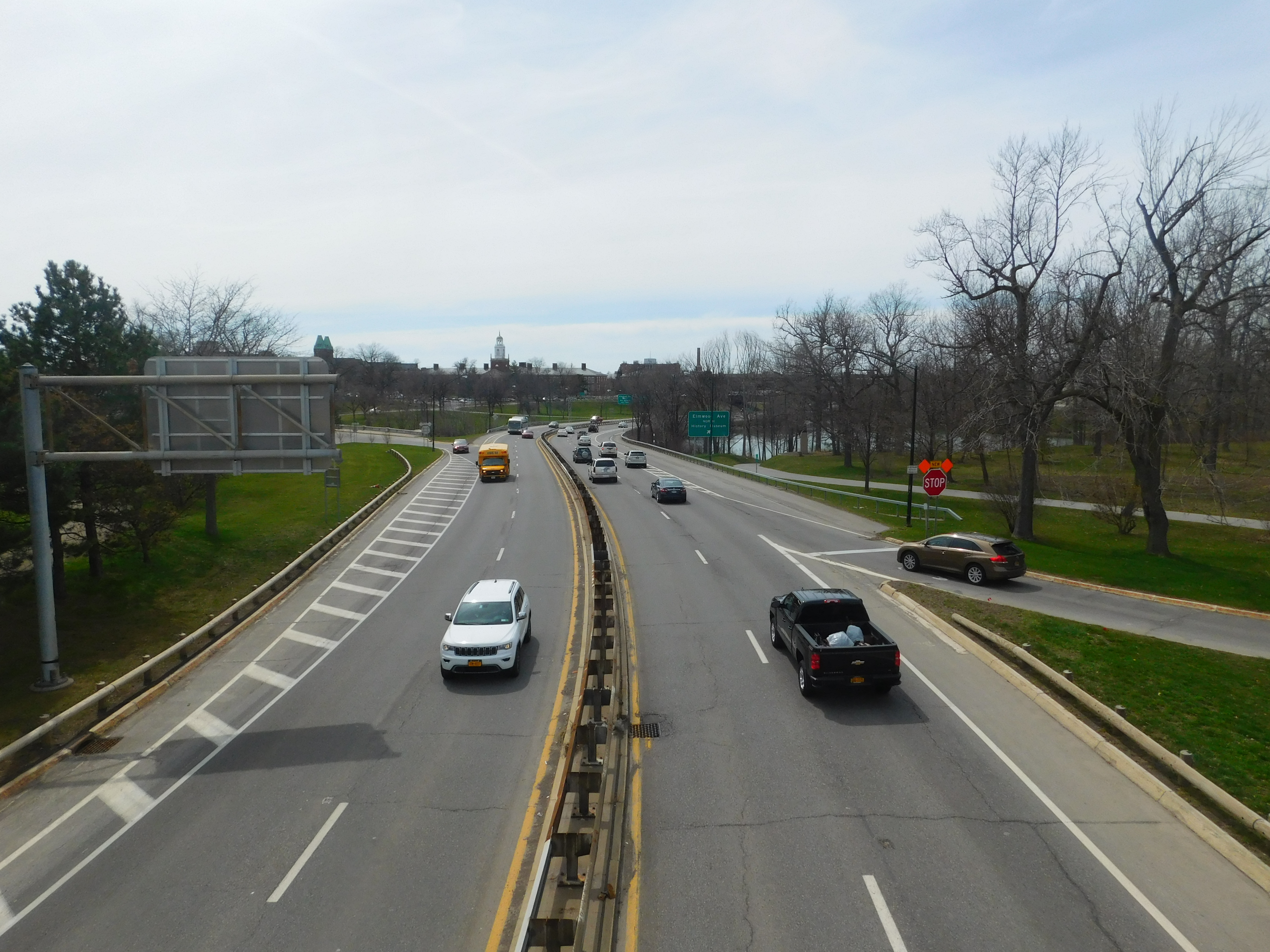
NY 198 westbound from a pedestrian overpass in Delaware Park

NY 198 begins at exit 11, a semi-directional T-interchange, of I-190 in the Black Rock section in the city of Buffalo, alongside the Niagara River. NY 198, known as the Scajaquada Expressway, proceeds northeastward through Buffalo as a four-lane expressway. Just after the interchange, the route crosses over NY 266 (Niagara Street) and westbound serves an interchange with NY 266 and NY 265. NY 198 winds northeast into the West Side of Buffalo, approaching the campus of Buffalo State College as it enters an interchange with Grant Street, accessible from both directions. At this interchange, NY 198 bends eastward along the northern edge of campus, passing Coyer Field, Moore Complex, and several residence halls as it bends southeast alongside the campus.

Now in the Elmwood Village section of Buffalo, NY 198 bends eastward once again and provides a four-way interchange with access to Elmwood Avenue and the nearby the Albright–Knox Art Gallery (now Buffalo AKG Art Museum) and Buffalo History Museum. After the interchange, NY 198 enters Delaware Park, passes Hoyt Lake, and then encounters a four-way interchange with NY 384 (Delaware Avenue). After NY 384, NY 198 bends southeast, passing north of Forest Lawn Cemetery and south of Delaware Park Golf Course and the Buffalo Zoo. NY 198 enters an at-grade intersection with Parkside Avenue, then leaves Delaware Park and interchanges with NY 5 (Main Street) just north of the Humboldt–Hospital station of Buffalo's Metro Rail. NY 198 crosses under Kensington Avenue and continues southeast, entering the Masten section of Buffalo. There, NY 198 enters an interchange, merging, in both directions, with NY 33 (the Kensington Expressway). This merge marks the eastern terminus of the NY 198 designation.

== History ==
The modern NY 198 corridor was originally served by Scajaquada Drive and Humboldt Parkway, two surface streets that linked Delaware Park to Humboldt Park (now Martin Luther King Jr. Park). Scajaquada Drive began at Grant Street and went eastward through Delaware Park to Agassiz Circle. Here, it met Humboldt Parkway, which ran from NY 384 in Delaware Park to Fillmore Avenue at Humboldt Park by way of the modern Scajaquada and Kensington Expressway corridors. Construction of the Scajaquada Expressway began in the early 1960s. The first section of the freeway extended from Grant Street to Delaware Avenue and was completed by 1961. An extension west to the Niagara Thruway opened in 1962, at which time all of the expressways were designated as NY 198. The portion of Humboldt Parkway between Delaware Avenue and the Kensington Expressway was upgraded into a divided highway in the mid-1960s, at which time it became part of NY 198.

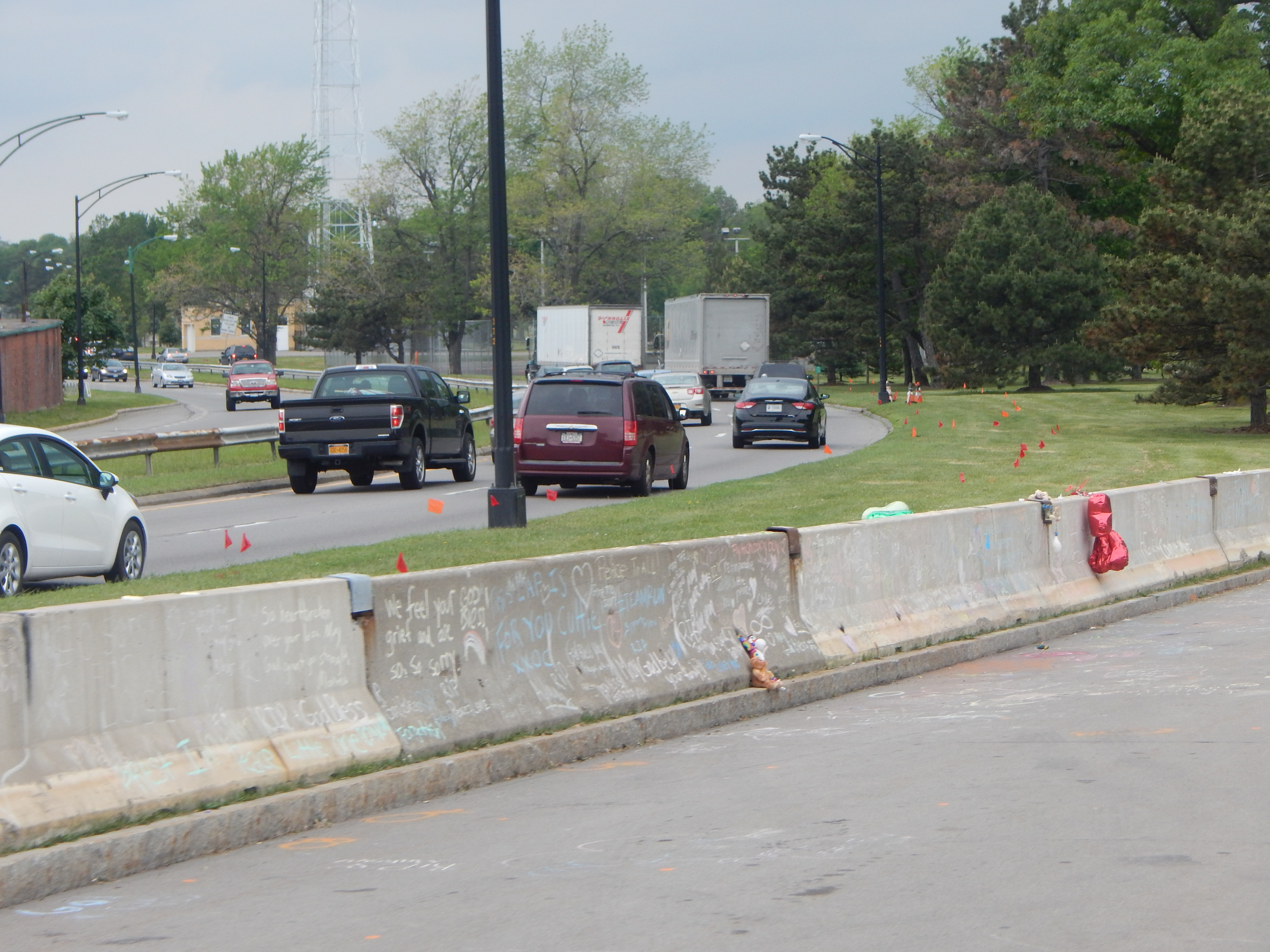
NY 198 near the memorial for Maksym Sugorovskiy after his death in May 2015.

The Scajaquada Corridor Coalition, which includes Buffalo Olmsted Parks Conservancy, Buffalo Niagara Waterkeeper, Vision Niagara, Restore Our Community Coalition, SUNY Buffalo State, GObike Buffalo and the Grant Amherst Business Association, would like to restore parkways designed by Frederick Law Olmsted a century ago, and have proposed that the highway be downgraded to a pedestrian-friendly roadway more in harmony with the surrounding communities. The New York State Department of Transportation is investigating eight possible plans for the expressway based on suggestions by community groups over the last fifteen years. In September 2015, they published studies on how these plans would affect traffic in the surrounding neighborhoods. These plans are currently estimated to cost around $150 million. According to the state, there are environmental and economic studies, as required by federal law, currently underway on all eight plans which should be concluded in 2016 at which point public hearings will be held to determine the fate of the corridor. Due to a fatal accident when a car driven by 28-year-old Christian Myers went off the road and into the park, striking Mary Sugorovskiy and her two children, five-year-old Stephanie and three-year-old Maksym, killing Maksym almost instantly, the speed limit has been permanently dropped as of May 31, 2015, to 30 miles per hour (48 km/h). New guardrails have been installed, and the event has increased demands for the expressway to be converted to a parkway. Opposing parties are demanding that the speed limit be raised again, and that the expressway remain an expressway. Mayor Byron Brown is on record as wanting the speed limit raised beyond Delaware Park in both directions as is Assemblyman Robin Schimminger, while some community groups and Assemblyman Sean Ryan have petitioned Governor Andrew Cuomo to issue an immediate order for conversion in violation of federal law regarding economic and environmental study requirements and construction.

== Exit list ==
The entire route is in Buffalo, Erie County. All exits are unnumbered.

mi	km	Destinations	Notes
0.00	0.00	I-190 – Downtown Buffalo, Niagara Falls	Western terminus; exit 11 on I-190
		NY 265 north (Tonawanda Street) / NY 266 (Niagara Street)	Westbound exit and eastbound entrance; southern terminus of NY 265
0.75	1.21	Grant Street – Buffalo State College	
1.42	2.29	Elmwood Avenue	
2.02	3.25	NY 384 (Delaware Avenue)	
		Parkside Avenue – Buffalo Zoo	At-grade intersection
2.93	4.72	NY 5 (Main Street)	
3.59	5.78	NY 33 – Downtown Buffalo, Airport	Eastern terminus
1.000 mi = 1.609 km; 1.000 km = 0.621 mi: Incomplete access
