= New York State Route 265 =

State highway in western New York, US

New York State Route 265
- Military Road
- Map of the Buffalo–Niagara Falls area with NY 265 highlighted in red

Route information
- Maintained by NYSDOT and the cities of Buffalo, Tonawanda and Niagara Falls
- Length: 19.75 mi (31.78 km)
- Existed: c. 1936–present
- Tourist routes: Great Lakes Seaway Trail

Major junctions
- South end: NY 198 / NY 266 in Buffalo
- US 62 in Niagara Falls; I-190 / NY 104 / Niagara Scenic Parkway in Lewiston
- North end: NY 104 in Lewiston

Location
- Country: United States
- State: New York
- Counties: Erie, Niagara

Highway system
- New York Highways; Interstate; US; State; Reference; Parkways
← NY 264	→ NY 266

New York State Route 265 (NY 265) is a 19.75-mile (31.78 km) long state highway located in the western part of New York in the United States. NY 265 is a north–south route that roughly parallels the western parts of the Niagara River in Erie County and Niagara County. For much of its southern course, it is more frequently referred to by its longtime name, Military Road, which dates back to 1801 as a road to connect the city of Black Rock (now Buffalo) and Fort Niagara near Lake Ontario.

The route begins at an intersection with NY 266 (Niagara Street) and ramps for the Scajaquada Expressway (NY 198) in the city of Buffalo. The route runs through the Black Rock and Riverside sections of Buffalo, the village of Kenmore, the town and city of Tonawanda in Erie County; as well as North Tonawanda, Wheatfield, Niagara Falls and Lewiston. The route ends at a junction with NY 104 in Lewiston.

== Route description ==
=== Buffalo and the Tonawandas ===
NY 265 begins at an intersection with NY 266 (Niagara Street) and ramps to the Scajaquada Expressway (NY 198) in the Black Rock section of Buffalo in the shades of the NY 198 / Interstate 190 (I-190) interchange. NY 265 runs north along Tonawanda Street through Black Rock, passing the former New York Central Railroad freight depot in the area and tracks used by Amtrak for their Empire Service and Maple Leaf trains. At the junction with Amherst Street, NY 265 turns east onto Amherst, crossing towards the intersection with Military Road.

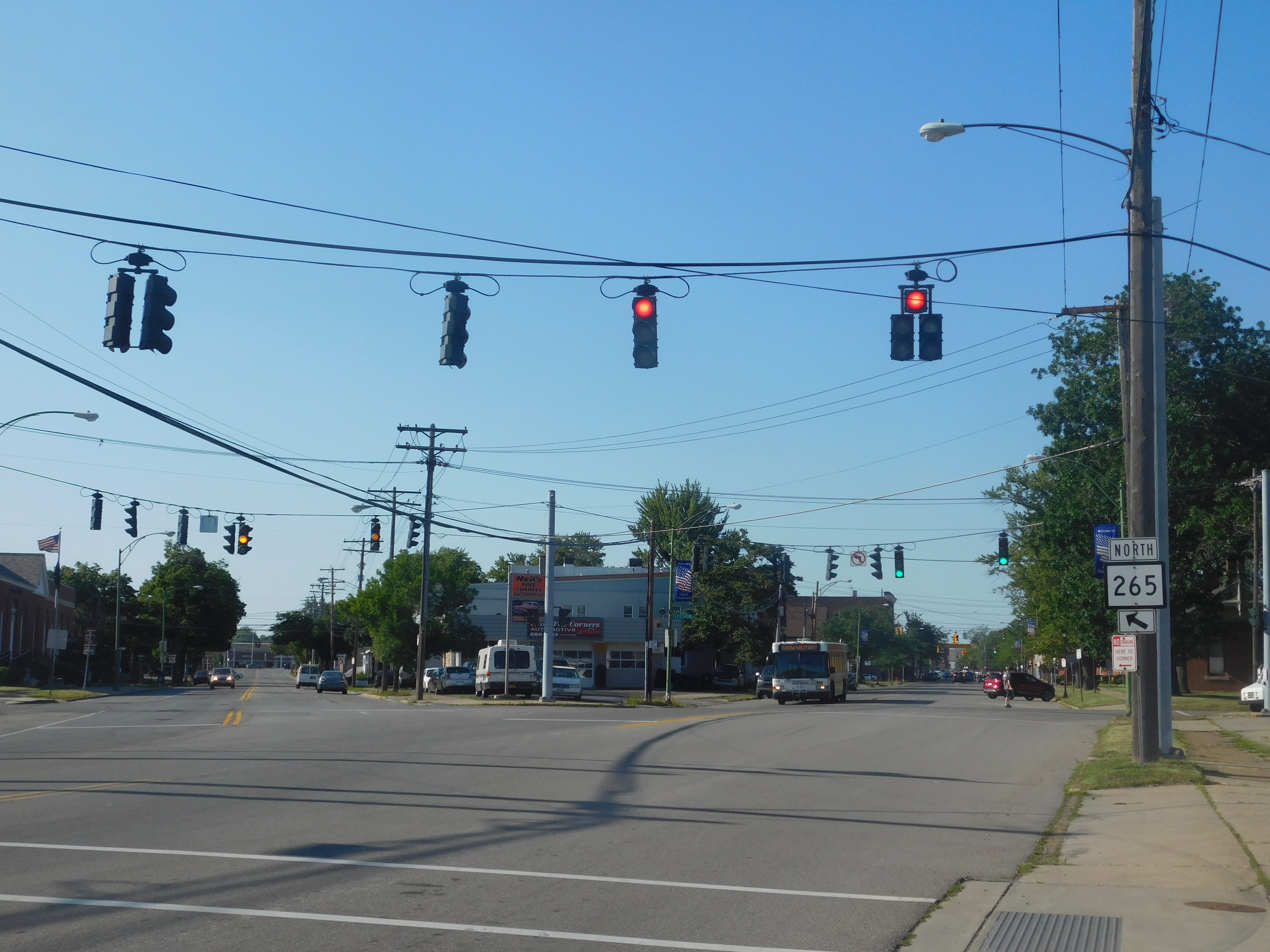
A NY 265 shield with an incorrect design along Main Street in the city of Tonawanda

Forking northeast onto Military Road, NY 265 continues through Black Rock as a two-lane city street. Crossing over some railroad tracks, the route descends into the Riverside section of Buffalo, reaching the town of Tonawanda and soon after, the village of Kenmore. Military Road runs along the west side of Kenmore, soon reaching an intersection with NY 324 (Sheridan Drive). The route continues north along Military, expanding to four lanes from two, continuing through the town of Tonawanda. After crossing under I-290 (the Youngmann Expressway), NY 265 enters the city of Tonawanda.

After passing the city cemetery, NY 265 runs north along Main Street, crossing under tracks once used by New York Central. At Fletcher Street, the route turns off Main and turns onto Seymour Street, running north until an intersection with the northern terminus of NY 266 (Niagara Street) in downtown Tonawanda. Crossing over the Erie Canal, NY 265 enters Niagara County and the city of North Tonawanda.

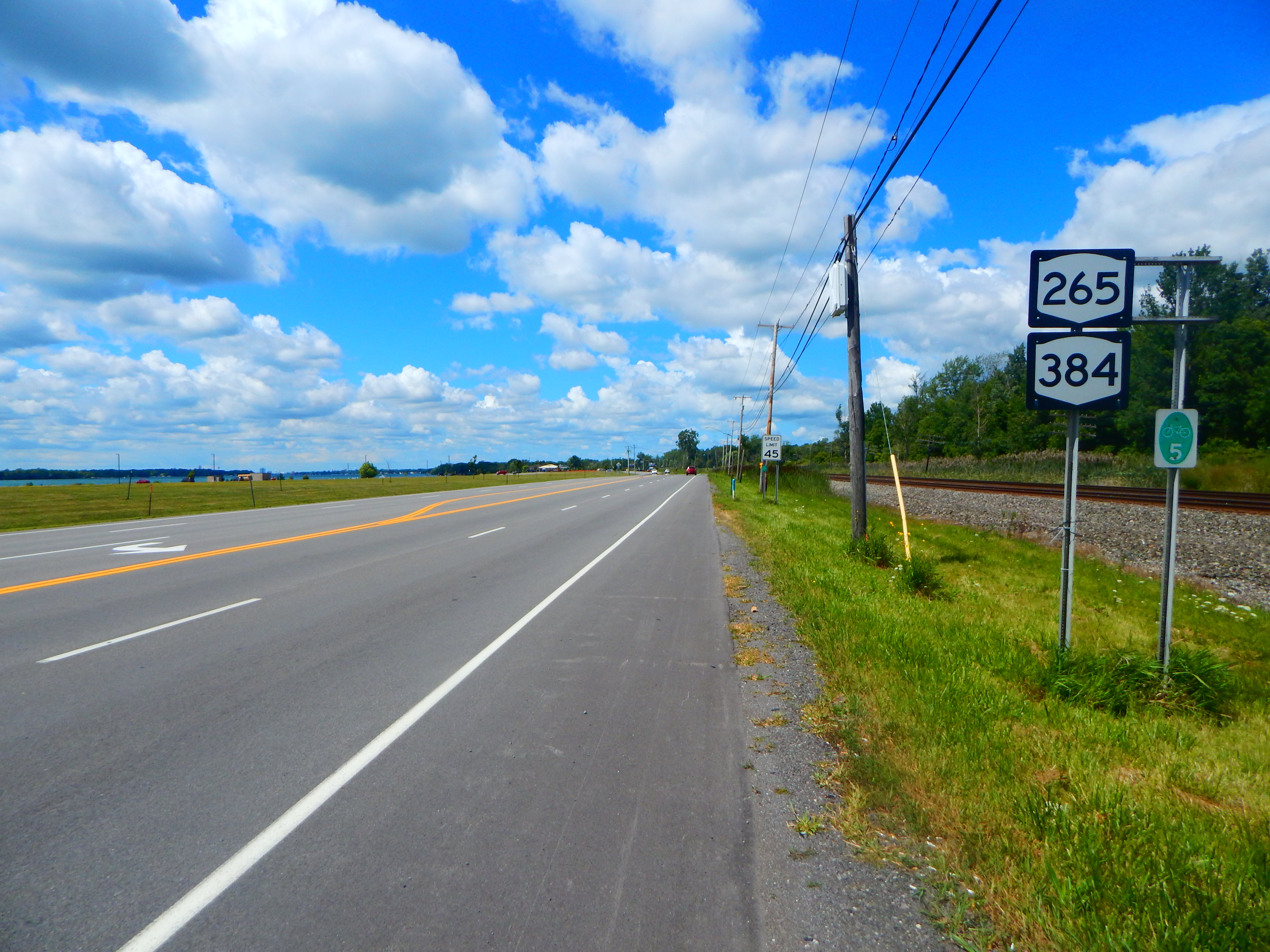
NY 265 and NY 384 at Ward Road in North Tonawanda

Now known as River Road, NY 265 remains a four-lane boulevard through North Tonawanda, bypassing downtown to the west and paralleling the Niagara River. As the route begins to bend towards the riverside, NY 265 meets a junction with NY 384 (Main Street). NY 265 and NY 384 become concurrent through North Tonawanda, passing a junction with the western terminus of NY 429 (Wheatfield Street), following the riverside and the industrial area of the city. Continuing along the riverside, the routes start paralleling the Amtrak tracks and begin following along Gratwick Riverside Park.

=== Wheatfield, Niagara Falls and Lewiston ===
Entering the town of Wheatfield, NY 265 and NY 384 retains River Road, returning to two lanes. The tracks turn northward from the routes, which turn westward along the riverside section of Wheatfield, paralleling the Niagara. The route soon junction with Williams Road, unsigned NY 952V, a reference route. Williams Road serves as the eastern terminus of the LaSalle Expressway, which begins paralleling NY 265 and NY 384 as they enter the city of Niagara Falls. The routes soon enter the Love Canal section of Niagara Falls at a junction with 102nd Street. Becoming a frontage road for the LaSalle, the routes fork at a junction with South Military Road.

Now split from NY 384, NY 265 crosses under the LaSalle, turning northwest into a junction with Cayuga Drive. Dropping the South Military Road name, NY 265 runs northwest through Niagara Falls' east side as Cayuga Drive. Running along the west bank of Cayuga Creek, NY 265 soon reaches a fork with Military Road, which continues northwest as NY 265 while Cayuga Drive continues north along the creek. Military Road is a two-lane street through the east side of Niagara Falls, crossing an intersection with U.S. Route 62 (US 62; Niagara Falls Boulevard). The route expands to four lanes, passing the Fashion Outlets of Niagara Falls, crossing an intersection with Factory Outlet Boulevard (unsigned CR 115). NY 265 begins to parallel I-190 (the Niagara Expressway) and crossing an intersection with NY 182 (Packard Road). Crossing into the town of Niagara, NY 265 continues as Military Road, entering the hamlet of Pletchers Corners at a junction with Lockport Road (CR 6). Passing Niagara Falls Memorial Park, the road crosses a junction with Old Military Road and begins bending northwest toward the town of Lewiston and a junction with NY 31 (Witmer Road).

Reaching I-190, NY 265 and I-190 parallel onto a bridge over the Niagara Falls Power Reservoir, The routes fork as I-190 reaches exit 25A, which is a single northbound ramp to NY 265. Crossing Upper Mountain Road (CR 11) which serves I-190 exit 25B and the Niagara Scenic Parkway, the route crosses Fish Creek and through the Niagara Falls Country Club. At the club, NY 265 turns westward and reaches a junction with NY 104 (Lewiston Road), marking the northern terminus of NY 265.

== History ==
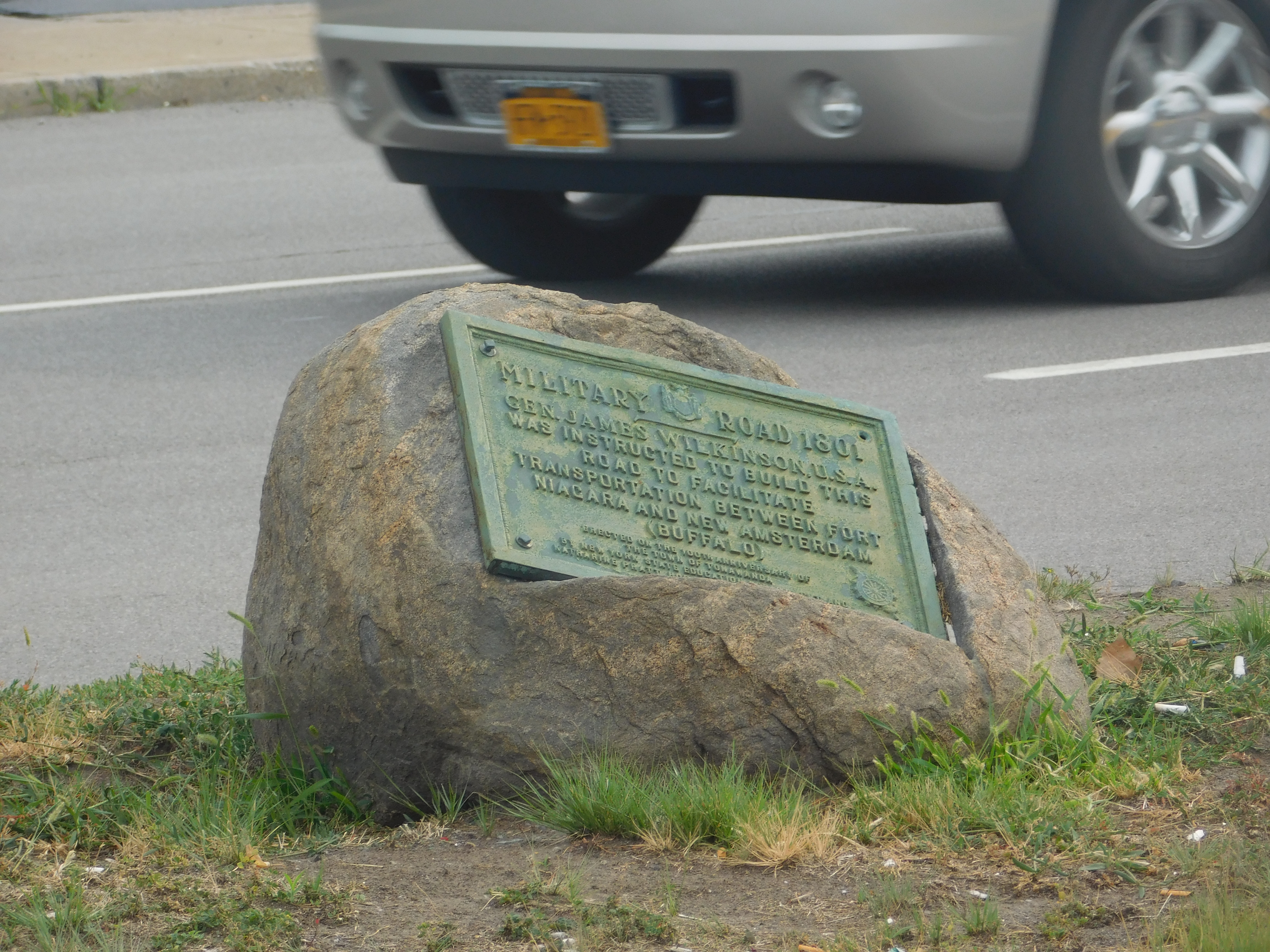
A plaque along NY 324 for the construction of Military Road.

Military Road, the road that would precede NY 265, was authorized in 1801 to be constructed between Fort Niagara to the area of Black Rock (future Buffalo) to General James Wilkinson to facilitate transportation. Construction began in 1802 through the town of Tonawanda. The new road, which went through settlements such as Youngstown, Lewiston, Niagara Falls, and Buffalo, due to concern about the new inhabitants of the area. The fatigue parties at the nearby Fort Niagara helped construct the new road, which went through Tonawanda from 1802 to 1809, helping to create a settlement called "Mohawk". Although Military Road was designed to defend the Niagara Frontier, it contributed to major commercial development through Erie and Niagara counties. The road, however, was muddy for the next two decades, and it was not until 1832 when the route became passable for adequate transportation all year round.

During the 1890s, trolley service through the village of Kenmore was extended along Military Road, and commuters who lived in Kenmore could now easily access the Belt Line, which would take them to the city of Buffalo for work. A station was located along Military Road to permit this access.

The surviving portions of that route are those that still carry the name. NY 265, meanwhile, was assigned c. 1936 to the portion of its modern alignment south of Tonawanda. That year, a stone was installed at the junction with NY 324 (Sheridan Drive) by the town of Tonawanda to honor the Military Road during the centennial of the city. It was extended northward along NY 384 and Military Road to its current northern terminus near Lewiston in the early 1940s.

== Major intersections ==
County	Location	mi	km	Destinations	Notes
Erie	Buffalo	0.00	0.00	NY 198 (Scajaquada Expressway) / NY 266 (Niagara Street)	Southern terminus
Erie	Town of Tonawanda	3.67	5.91	NY 324 (Sheridan Drive)	
Erie	Town of Tonawanda	4.64	7.47	To I-290	Access via CR 306
Erie	City of Tonawanda	6.43	10.35	NY 266 south (Niagara Street)	Northern terminus of NY 266; former NY 356
Niagara	North Tonawanda	7.06	11.36	NY 384 south (Main Street)	Southern end of NY 384 concurrency
Niagara	North Tonawanda	7.46	12.01	NY 429 north (Wheatfield Street)	Southern terminus of NY 429
Niagara	Wheatfield	11.55	18.59	Williams Road (NY 952V north)	
Niagara	Niagara Falls	12.56	20.21	NY 384 north (Buffalo Avenue)	Northern end of NY 384 concurrency
Niagara	Niagara Falls	13.57	21.84	US 62 (Niagara Falls Boulevard)	
Niagara	Niagara	15.13	24.35	NY 182 (Packard Road)	
Niagara	Niagara	16.97	27.31	NY 31 (Witmer Avenue)	
Niagara	Town of Lewiston	19.02	30.61	I-190 / NY 104 / Niagara Scenic Parkway	Exit 25A on I-190; access to NY 104/Niagara Parkway via Upper Mountain Road
Niagara	Town of Lewiston	19.75	31.78	NY 104 (Lewiston Road)	Northern terminus
1.000 mi = 1.609 km; 1.000 km = 0.621 mi: Concurrency terminus
