= Ontario Highway 405 =

Controlled-access highway in Ontario

Highway 405
- General Brock Parkway
- Highway 405 highlighted in red

Route information
- Maintained by Ministry of Transportation of Ontario
- Length: 8.7 km (5.4 mi)
- Existed: September 11, 1963–present

Major junctions
- West end: Queen Elizabeth Way in St. Catharines
- East end: I-190 at the U.S. border in Queenston

Location
- Country: Canada
- Province: Ontario

Highway system
- Ontario provincial highways; Current; Former; 400-series
← Highway 404	→ Highway 406

King's Highway 405, also known as Highway 405 and the General Brock Parkway, is a 400-series highway in the Canadian province of Ontario connecting the Queen Elizabeth Way (QEW) near St. Catharines with the Lewiston–Queenston Bridge in the village of Queenston. It then crosses the Niagara River on the Lewiston–Queenston Bridge, where it encounters the international border with the United States and continues into New York as Interstate 190 (I-190).

Designated and under construction by 1960, the short freeway was opened to traffic on September 11, 1963. On August 13, 2006, Highway 405 was dedicated the General Brock Parkway.

The speed limit is 100 km/h (62 mph). The route is patrolled by the Ontario Provincial Police (OPP) and maintained by the Ministry of Transportation of Ontario (MTO).

== Route description ==
Highway 405 serves to connect the northern end of I-190 in New York at the Lewiston–Queenston Bridge with the QEW, and therefore it follows a somewhat direct path between the two. Throughout its length, the highway gently climbs the Niagara Escarpment, reaching the top east of Stanley Avenue before crossing the Niagara Gorge. The highway is surrounded by forest to either side for most of its length, and the only settlement near it is the village of Queenston. As Highway 405 entirely lies within the Province of Ontario and is not subject to federal administration, its entire length is patrolled by the OPP.

Highway 405 begins by diverging from the QEW at St. Catharines. It continues north-east for 1.5 kilometres (0.93 mi), then gently curves south-easterly. The opposing lanes, initially separated by a wide gap, converge towards each other to form a 15-metre (49 ft) grass median. The highway dips into a shallow gully, widens to five lanes (three eastbound, two westbound), and then curves northeast to pass north of a hydroelectric reservoir for the Sir Adam Beck Hydroelectric Generating Stations. The opposing lanes converge, with an Ontario Tall Wall separating them, and pass beneath Niagara Regional Road 102 (Stanley Avenue). The freeway's lone interchange is with Stanley Avenue, and traffic continuing east must cross the Lewiston–Queenston Bridge into the United States. The additional eastbound lane provided along this section is for the queueing of trucks. After passing the reservoir, the highway reaches the Canada Border Services plaza. It then passes over the Niagara Parkway and heads onto the Lewiston–Queenston Bridge over the Niagara River. The Highway 405 designation ends at the border with the United States, where it continues as I-190 towards Buffalo, New York.

== History ==
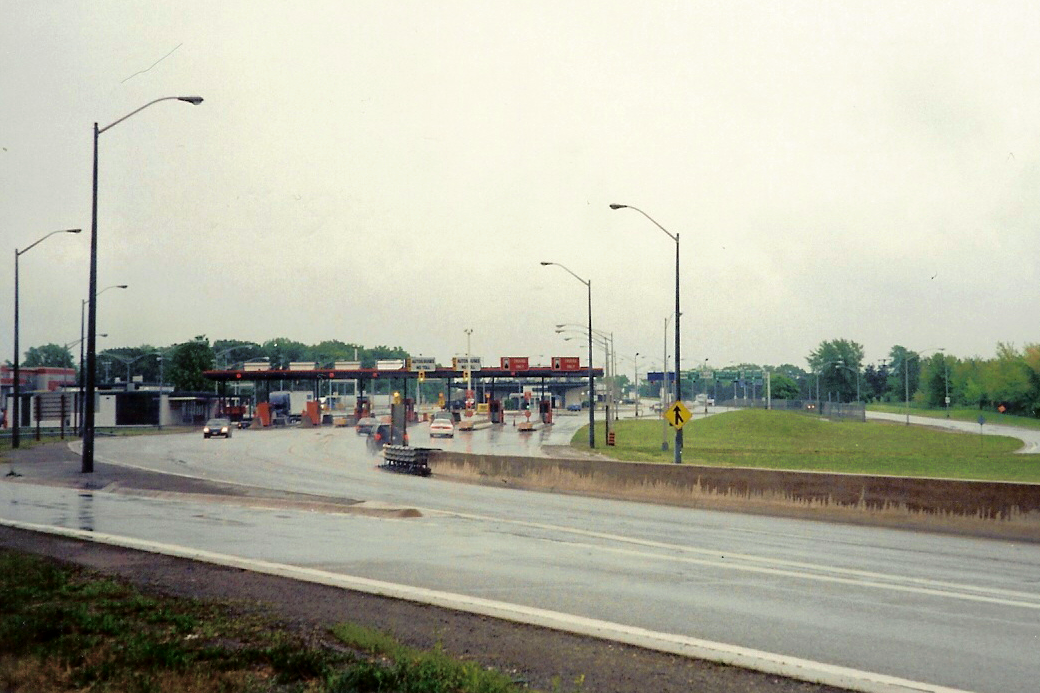
Highway 405 crosses the Lewiston–Queenston Bridge into New York.

Highway 405 was part of a network of divided highways envisioned by Thomas McQuesten in the mid-1930s to connect New York with Ontario. Though the Queen Elizabeth Way would cross the Niagara River by 1942 in Niagara Falls, Highway 405 and the Lewiston–Queenston Bridge would form the first direct freeway link between the neighbouring countries. Planning for both was underway by 1958, and construction began in 1960. The bridge was built at the same time as the freeway, though it opened several months earlier on November 1, 1962. Highway 405 was completed in August 1963 and officially opened to the public on September 11, 1963. In 1969, an interchange with Stanley Avenue was built and opened to traffic.

In 2004, the eastern end of the freeway was modified to permit the queueing of trucks at the border, with the addition of one lane to the eastbound carriageway beginning at Stanley Avenue. The reconstruction of the toll plaza resulted in the gradual removal of the interchange with the Niagara Parkway, with the westbound off-ramp to the Parkway remaining open to traffic until December 4, 2006, thereafter westbound motorists have to head west to the Stanley Avenue exit and take Portage Road in order to reach the Parkway.

The highway was named the General Brock Parkway on October 13, 2006 in honour of the War of 1812 hero, Major General Sir Isaac Brock, who died at the Battle of Queenston Heights.

== Exit list ==
The following table lists the major junctions along Highway 405, as noted by the Ministry of Transportation of Ontario. The entire route is located in the Regional Municipality of Niagara. All exits are unnumbered.

Location	km	mi	Destinations	Notes
Niagara-on-the-Lake	0.0	0.0	Queen Elizabeth Way – St. Catharines, Toronto	Highway 405 western terminus; Fort Erie-bound exit and Toronto-bound entrance; QEW exit 37
Niagara-on-the-Lake–Niagara Falls boundary	5.5	3.4	Regional Road 102 (Stanley Avenue) – Niagara Falls, Niagara-on-the-Lake	To Regional Road 61 (Townline Road); last exit in Ontario; speed limit reduced from 100 km/h to 60 km/h approaching the end of highway
Niagara-on-the-Lake	8.7	5.4	Niagara Parkway	Ramps closed December 4, 2006
Niagara-on-the-Lake	8.7	5.4	Lewiston–Queenston Border Crossing	
Niagara River; Canada–United States border	8.7	5.4	Lewiston–Queenston Bridge	
Niagara River; Canada–United States border	8.7	5.4	I-190 south – Buffalo	Continuation into New York (state)
1.000 mi = 1.609 km; 1.000 km = 0.621 mi: Closed/former; Incomplete access; Tolled; Route transition
