= Scajaquada Creek =

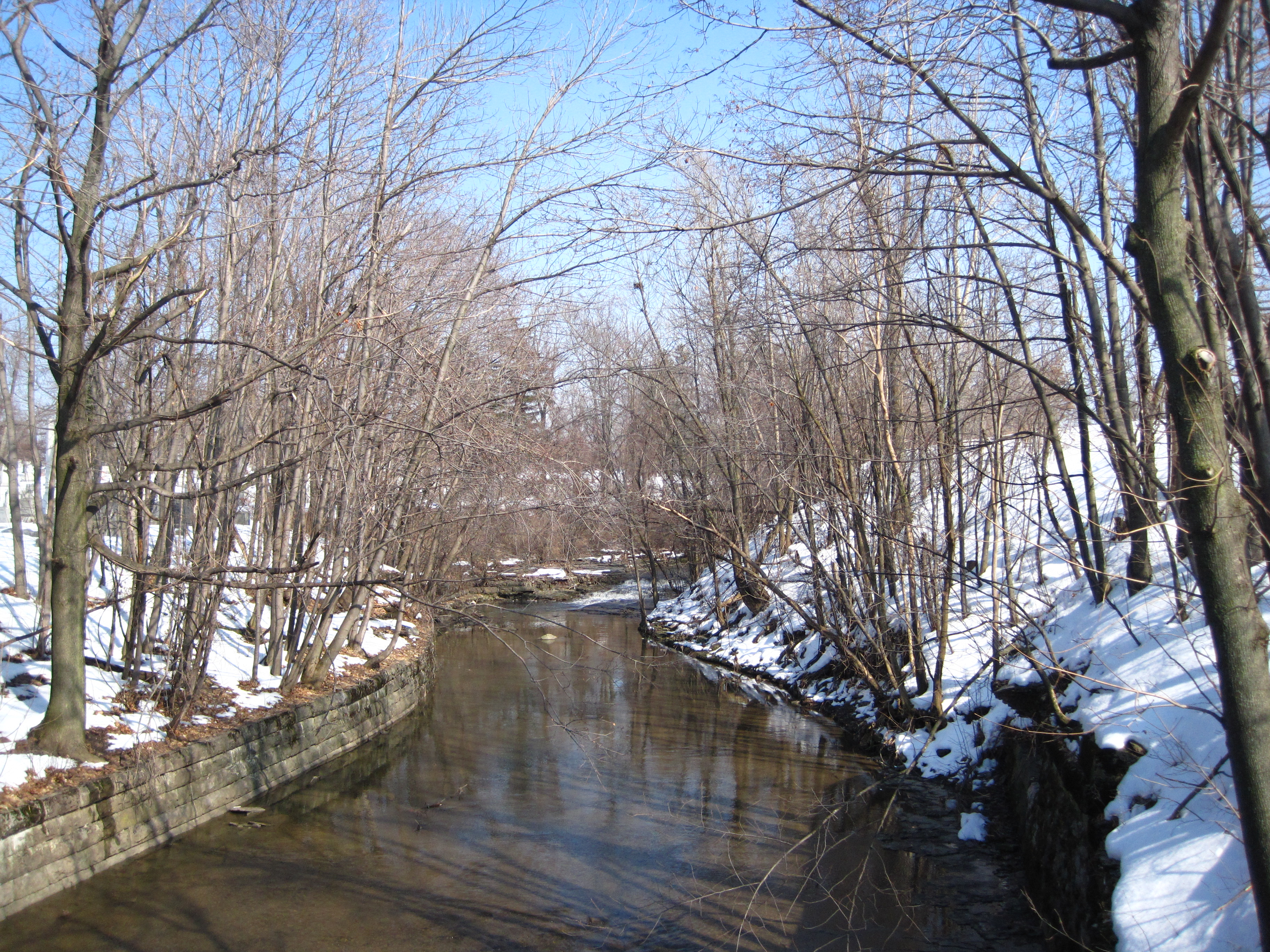
- A view up Scajaquada Creek within Forest Lawn Cemetery.
- Mouth of Scajaquada Creek
- Location of the mouth of Scajaquada Creek in New York State Scajaquada Creek (the United States)

Location
- Country: United States
- State: New York
- County: Erie

Physical characteristics
- Source
  - coordinates: 42°55′37″N 78°38′50″W
- Mouth: Niagara River
  - coordinates: 42°55′45″N 78°53′57″W
- Length: 13 mi (21 km)
- Basin size: 29 sq mi (75 km^{2})

Basin features
- Progression: Niagara River→ Lake Ontario→ Saint Lawrence River→ Gulf of Saint Lawrence

Scajaquada Creek (/skəˈdʒækwədə/ skə-JA-kwə-də) is a stream in Erie County, New York, United States. The name is derived from Philip Kenjockety, a Native American described as the oldest resident of the region upon his death in 1808.

The creek lends its name to the Scajaquada Expressway, New York State Route 198, a highway that briefly adjoins the creek's southern shore. A bike path follows the creek's northern shore most of the way from Delaware Park to the Niagara River. Buffalo State College, the Buffalo AKG Art Museum, and the Buffalo History Museum overlook Scajaquada Creek.

== Course ==
A 13-mile (21 km) stream that drains a watershed of 29 square miles (75 km^{2}), Scajaquada Creek rises in the Town of Lancaster in Erie County, east of Buffalo. The creek passes through most of the Town of Cheektowaga before it is diverted into an underground culvert. The culvert carries the creek for miles through much of Buffalo, emerging in Forest Lawn. The creek passes through the Forest Lawn Cemetery, next to Delaware Park, and over Serenity Falls. The falls has a total vertical drop of 12 feet (3.7 m) in a horizontal distance of 200 feet (61 m). It is one of two waterfalls in Buffalo, along with Cazenovia Park Falls. While the Scajaquada once flowed into Hoyt Lake in Delaware Park, it was buried by 1921 in response to pollution and urban development. Today, it bypasses the lake through a channel and culvert on the lake's south shore. The creek flows through part of the Erie Canal known as the Black Rock Canal, then empties into the Niagara River.

== 1814 Battle ==
In early August 1814, during the War of 1812, a force of about 600 British soldiers crossed into New York from Canada in an attempt to raid American supply depots kept in Black Rock, New York. This operation was to be carried out in preparation for the Siege of Fort Erie. However, American riflemen detected the British landing and prepared defenses at Scajaquada Creek, then known as "Conjocta Creek". British forces attempted to cross the creek to reach Black Rock, but became engaged in an intense skirmish with the roughly 200 American riflemen defending the creek. The fighting lasted an hour before the British force retreated to Canada. The British force suffered 12 killed and 17 wounded, while the Americans suffered 2 killed and 8 wounded. Shadrack Byfield, an English private soldier, was wounded in the battle and subsequently lost his left forearm to amputation. After returning home, the veteran devised a prosthetic tool to allow him to resume work as a weaver despite his disability; Byfield also recorded his military experiences in a published memoir.
