= Buffalo Harbor State Park =

Urban park in Buffalo, New York, USA

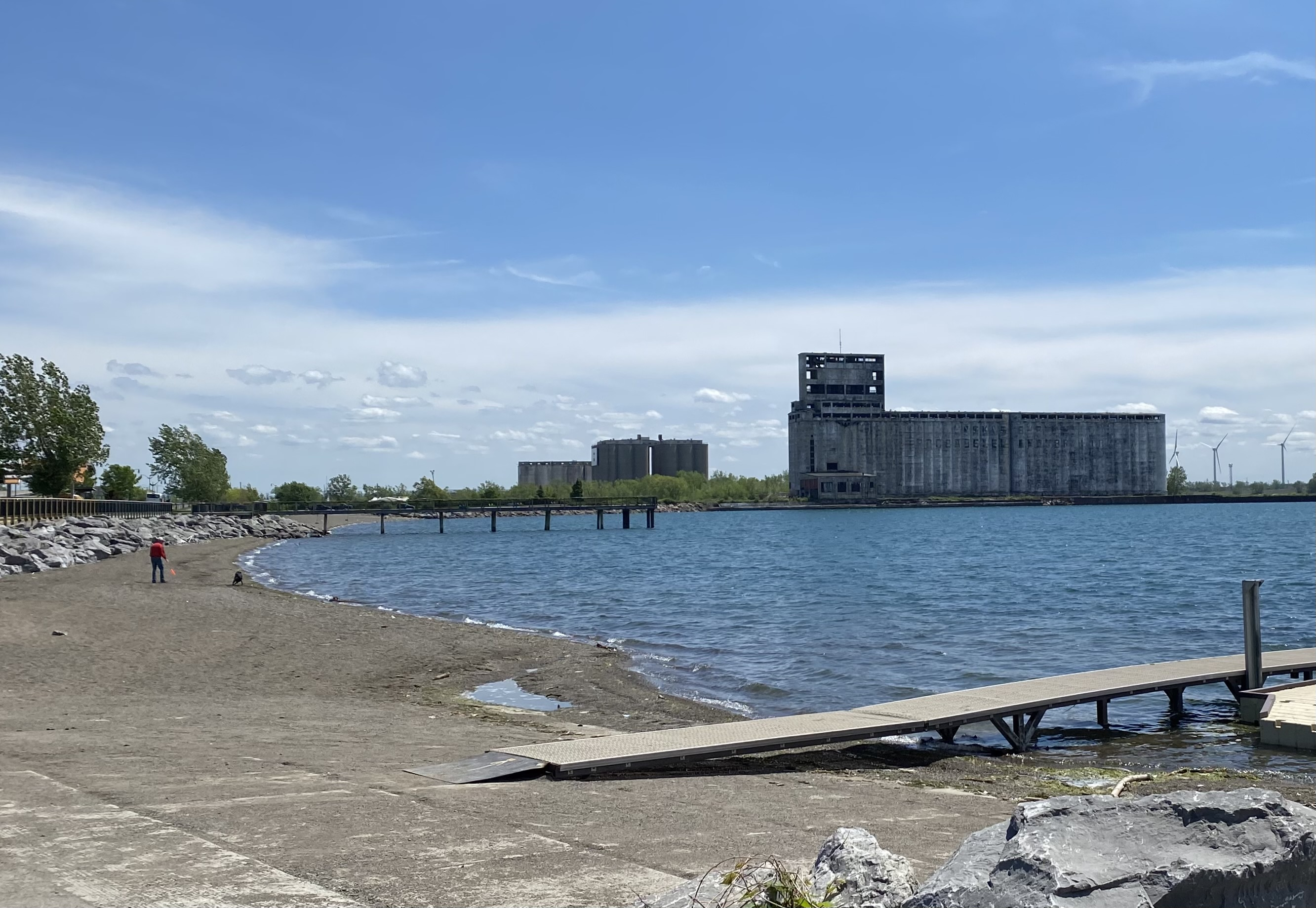
- Gallagher Beach at Buffalo Harbor State Park, May 2021

- Location within New York
- Interactive map of Buffalo Harbor State Park
- Type: State park
- Location: 1111 Fuhrmann Blvd. Buffalo, New York
- Nearest city: Buffalo, New York
- Coordinates: 42°50′46″N 78°51′42″W
- Area: 190 acres (0.77 km^{2})
- Created: 2015
- Operator: New York State Office of Parks, Recreation and Historic Preservation
- Visitors: 283,077
- Open: All year
- Website: Buffalo Harbor State Park

Buffalo Harbor State Park is a 190-acre (0.77 km^{2}) state park and marina on the shore of Lake Erie in the city of Buffalo in Erie County, New York. The park encompasses Gallagher Beach, the former NFTA Small Boat Harbor, and the waterfront land in between.

The park is 1 of 80 New York State Parks that are in the path of totality for the 2024 solar eclipse, with the park experiencing 3 minutes and 46 seconds of totality.

== History ==
Buffalo Harbor State Park was created in 2014 from a portion of a larger transfer of 340 acres (1.4 km^{2}) of land from the Niagara Frontier Transportation Authority to the Empire State Development Corporation. The New York State Office of Parks, Recreation and Historic Preservation was scheduled to take over park operations in November 2014. The $15 million development of the new park is part of an overall initiative to revitalize Buffalo's outer harbor.

The park officially opened to the public on May 24, 2015. Although first-year visitors praised the park's modern playground, some marina slipholders expressed displeasure with the marina's new operator, a private company from Tennessee.

A second phase of park improvements, featuring $3.76 million in breakwall and revetment enhancements for the park's harbor, was announced in November 2015. Plans call for the installation of a paved walkway and bike path for accessing the breakwall, in addition to improved lighting and a new fishing platform. The improvements are scheduled to be completed by fall 2016.

== Park facilities ==
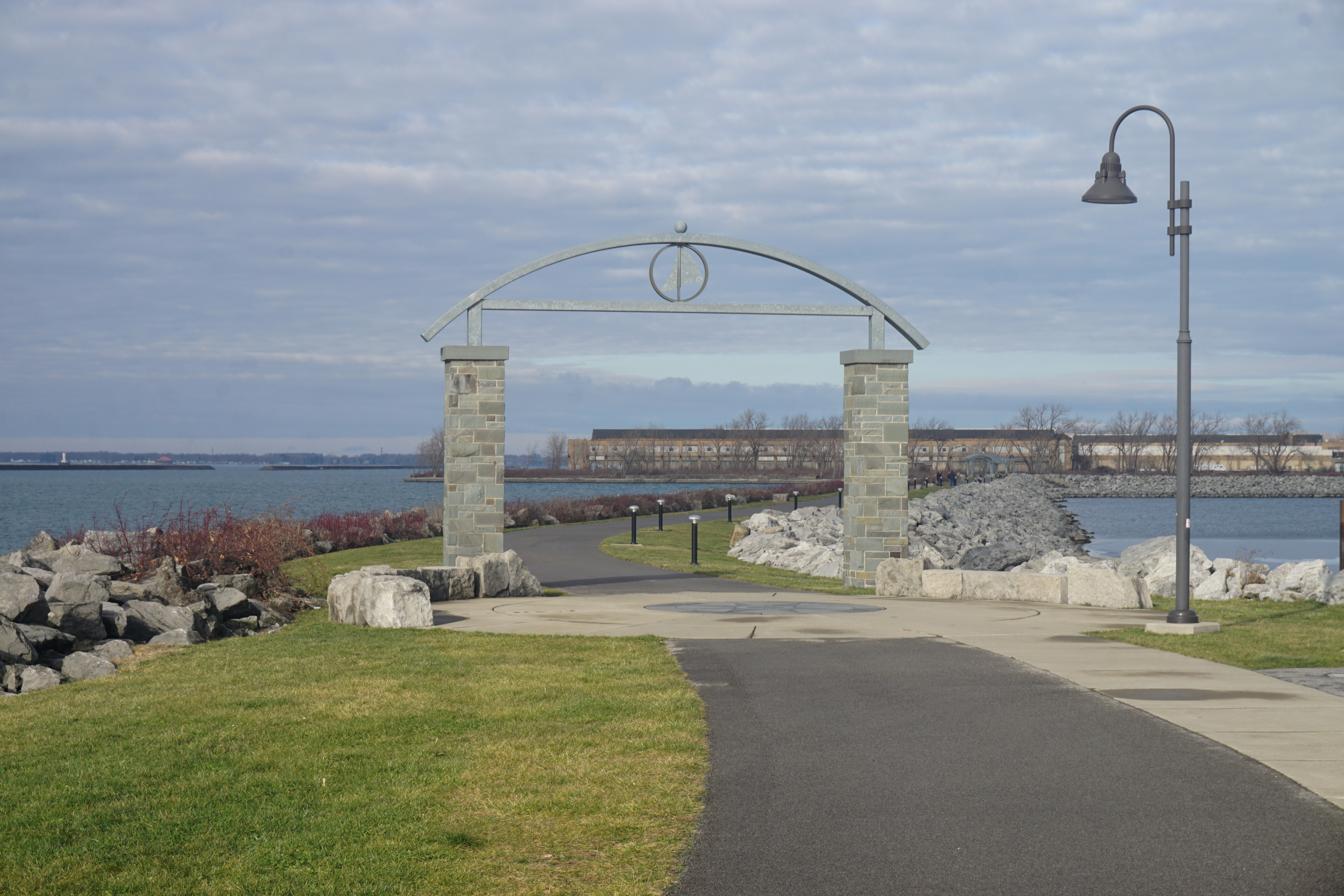
Buffalo Harbor State Park

The park features a 1,000 slip marina, boat launches, a fish cleaning station, a nautical-themed playground, and picnic pavilions, and a restaurant. A beach is also available, however swimming is not permitted as of 2015. Kayak rentals and improvements to the park's restaurant, including the addition of an 1,800-square-foot (170 m^{2}) patio, were announced in 2016.

== See also ==
- List of New York state parks
