= New York State Route 384 =

State highway in western New York, US

New York State Route 384
- Map of the Buffalo–Niagara Falls area with NY 384 highlighted in red and NY 952B in blue

Route information
- Maintained by NYSDOT and the cities of Buffalo, Tonawanda, North Tonawanda, and Niagara Falls
- Length: 21.73 mi (34.97 km)
- Existed: 1930–present
- Tourist routes: Great Lakes Seaway Trail

Major junctions
- South end: NY 5 in Buffalo
- I-290 / CR 119 / CR 306 in Tonawanda; I-190 / LaSalle Expressway / Niagara Scenic Parkway in Niagara Falls
- North end: NY 104 / Highway 420 on the Rainbow Bridge at the Canadian border in Niagara Falls

Location
- Country: United States
- State: New York
- Counties: Erie, Niagara

Highway system
- New York Highways; Interstate; US; State; Reference; Parkways
← NY 383B	→ NY 385

New York State Route 384 (NY 384) is a state highway in Western New York in the United States. It is a north–south route extending from the city of Buffalo, Erie County to the city of Niagara Falls, Niagara County, and is one of several routes directly connecting the two cities. The southern terminus of the route is at NY 5 in downtown Buffalo. NY 384's northern terminus is at the Rainbow Bridge in downtown Niagara Falls. Through its entire course in Erie County, it is known as Delaware Avenue for the street it follows in the city. In Niagara County, NY 384 follows the Niagara River and is named River Road and Buffalo Avenue.

NY 384 was assigned in 1930 to the riverside roadway linking Buffalo to Niagara Falls. It was rerouted south of the city of Tonawanda by 1938 to follow a more inland route to Buffalo. Only minor realignments within downtown Buffalo and Niagara Falls have occurred since.

== Route description ==
=== Erie County ===
NY 384 begins at an intersection with NY 5 at the northern terminus of Buffalo Skyway in the city of Buffalo. NY 384 proceeds north along Delaware Avenue, a two-lane commercial street through the downtown section of Buffalo, soon reaching Niagara Square at the junction with Niagara Square. NY 384 runs along the roundabout that surrounds the square, turning north on the northern continuation of Delaware Avenue. Crossing north through the city center, the route passes Johnson Park and reaches the Elmwood neighborhood of Buffalo. The route expands to four lanes near Allen Street, beginning to parallel NY 5 from a distance. Entering a residential section of Elmwood, NY 384 continues north along Delaware Avenue, passing the Catholic Academy of West Buffalo near West Ferry Street.

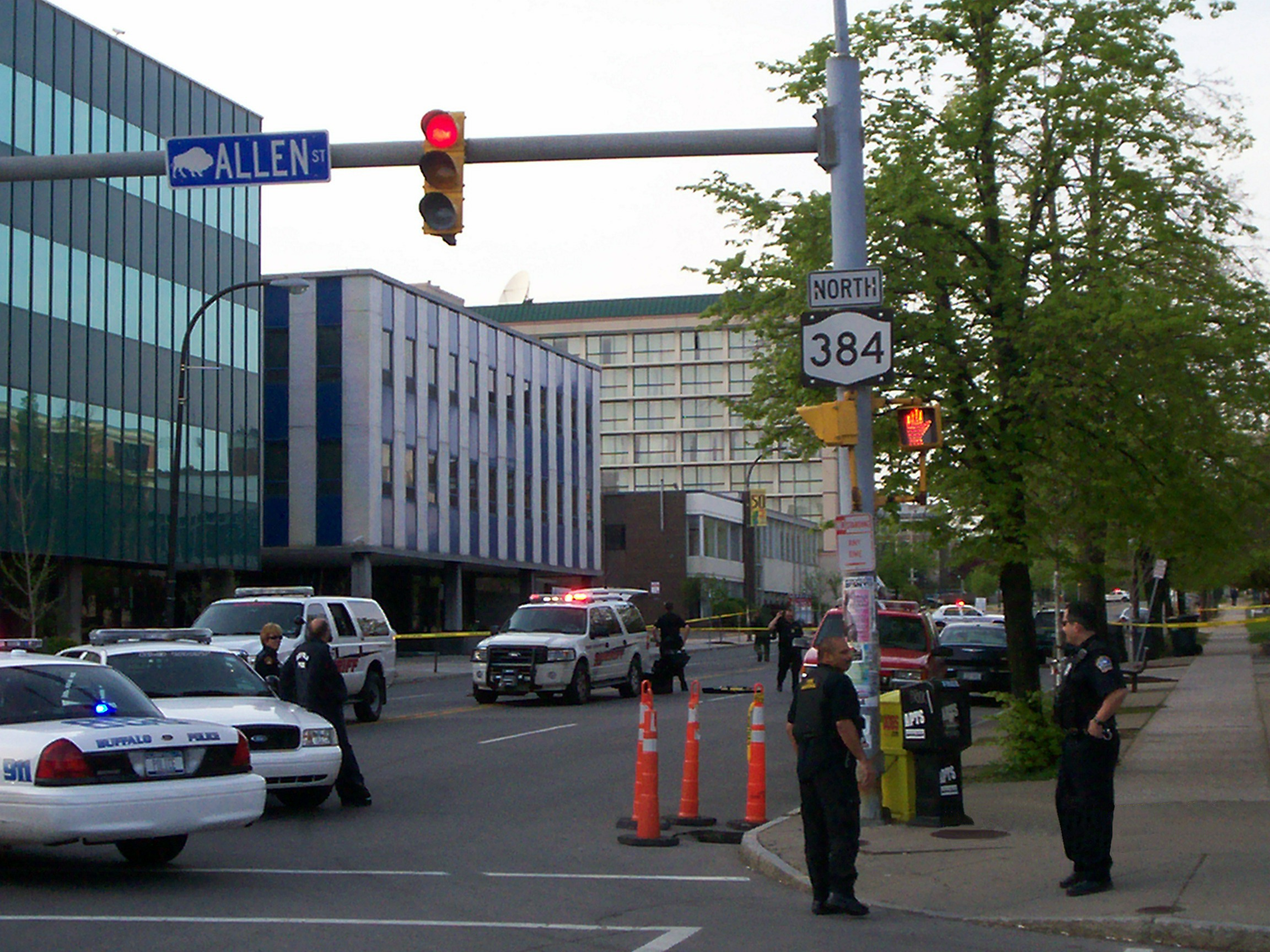
NY 384 at Allen Street, during an incident with the Buffalo Police

NY 384 continues north into Gates Circle, which is surrounded by the former Millard Fillmore Gates Circle Hospital and made up of a traffic circle with Chapin Parkway and Lafayette Avenue. Continuing north along Delaware Avenue, the route passes the Forest Lawn Cemetery a block north of Gates Circle, passing the entrance at Delavan Avenue. NY 384 runs along the western edge of the cemetery, leaving the Elmwood neighborhood for North Buffalo, where NY 384 turns northeast at Forest Avenue. Expanding into a four-lane boulevard, NY 384 crosses over a piece of Park Lake as it circumnavigates several S-curves through Delaware Park. In the park, NY 384 enters a partial cloverleaf interchange with NY 198 (the Scajaquada Expressway).

Just north of the interchange, NY 384 crosses Nottingham Terrace and leaves Delaware Park. Continuing through North Buffalo, the route runs north along Delaware Avenue as a four-lane undivided boulevard, passing numerous businesses on both directions of the road, crossing under a railroad line in the area. The route changes little through North Buffalo, crossing multiple residential side streets and a junction with Kenmore Avenue. At that junction, the route crosses into Kenmore, and NY 384 becomes a mix of residential and industrial as it crosses north. The route soon crosses into the Town of Tonawanda and the Paramount neighborhood, where NY 384 reaches a junction with the divided NY 324 (Sheridan Drive).

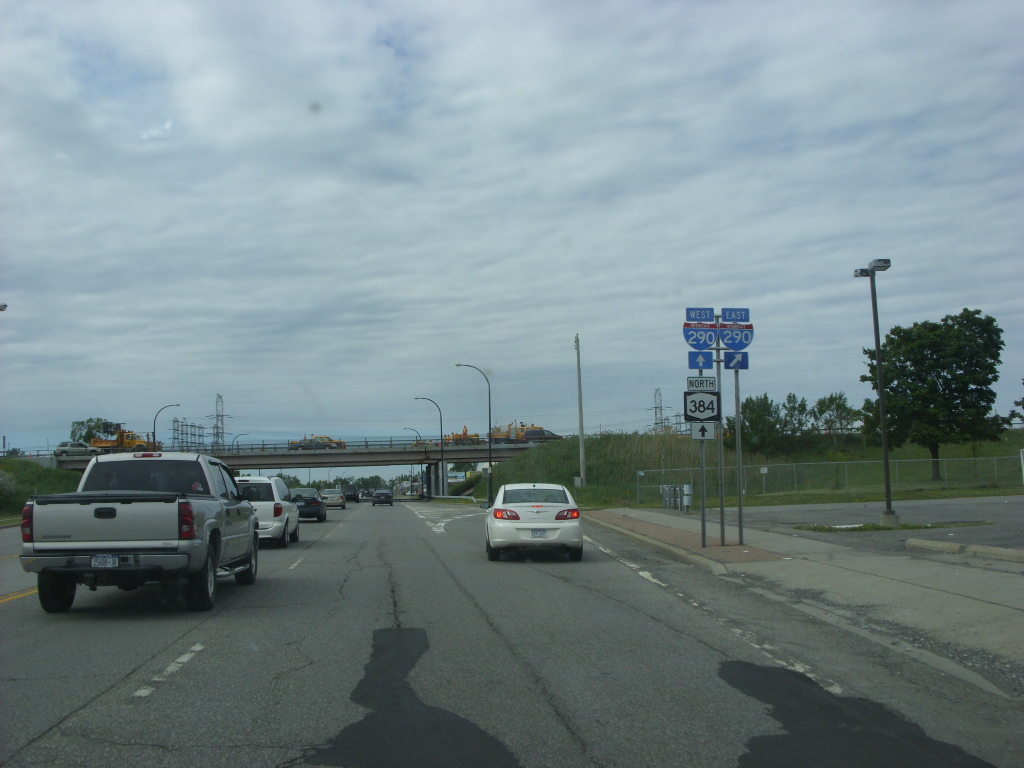
NY 384 at the interchange with I-290 in Tonawanda

Continuing north along Delaware Avenue, NY 384 crosses through Tonawanda as a four-lane commercial strip, passing the Bartender's Professional Training Institute. NY 384 begins to parallel the eastern edge of Mount Olivet Cemetery, crossing through the center of the cemetery near the intersection with Delaware Road. Crossing into the Elmwood North section of Tonawanda, NY 384 leaves the cemetery and enters exit 1A of I-290 (the Youngmann Expressway). After I-290, NY 384 continues north along Delaware Avenue through the Cardinal O'Hara section of the city, shrinking to two lanes in the residential neighborhood. Crossing under active railroad tracks, the route changes monikers to Delaware Street and begins to enter the City of Tonawanda.

At the intersection with Broad Street, NY 384 crosses over Tonawanda Creek and crosses into Raintree Island, where it intersects with East Niagara Street. Crossing over the Erie Canal, NY 384 crosses into Niagara County and the town of North Tonawanda.

=== Niagara County ===
Now known as Main Street through North Tonawanda, NY 384 remains proceeding northward through a commercial neighborhood. Near Webster Street, the route turns northwest, paralleling nearby railroad tracks into a junction with NY 265 (River Road). NY 265 and NY 384 become concurrent along River Road, running along the Little River through North Tonawanda as a four-lane industrial highway. The routes cross a junction with the western terminus of NY 429 (Wheatfield Street) before reaching Fishermans Park and soon after, Gratwick Riverside Park along the Little River. Continuing a parallel with the nearby railroad tracks, NY 265 and NY 384 continue northwest along the riverside, passing multiple entrances into Gratwick.

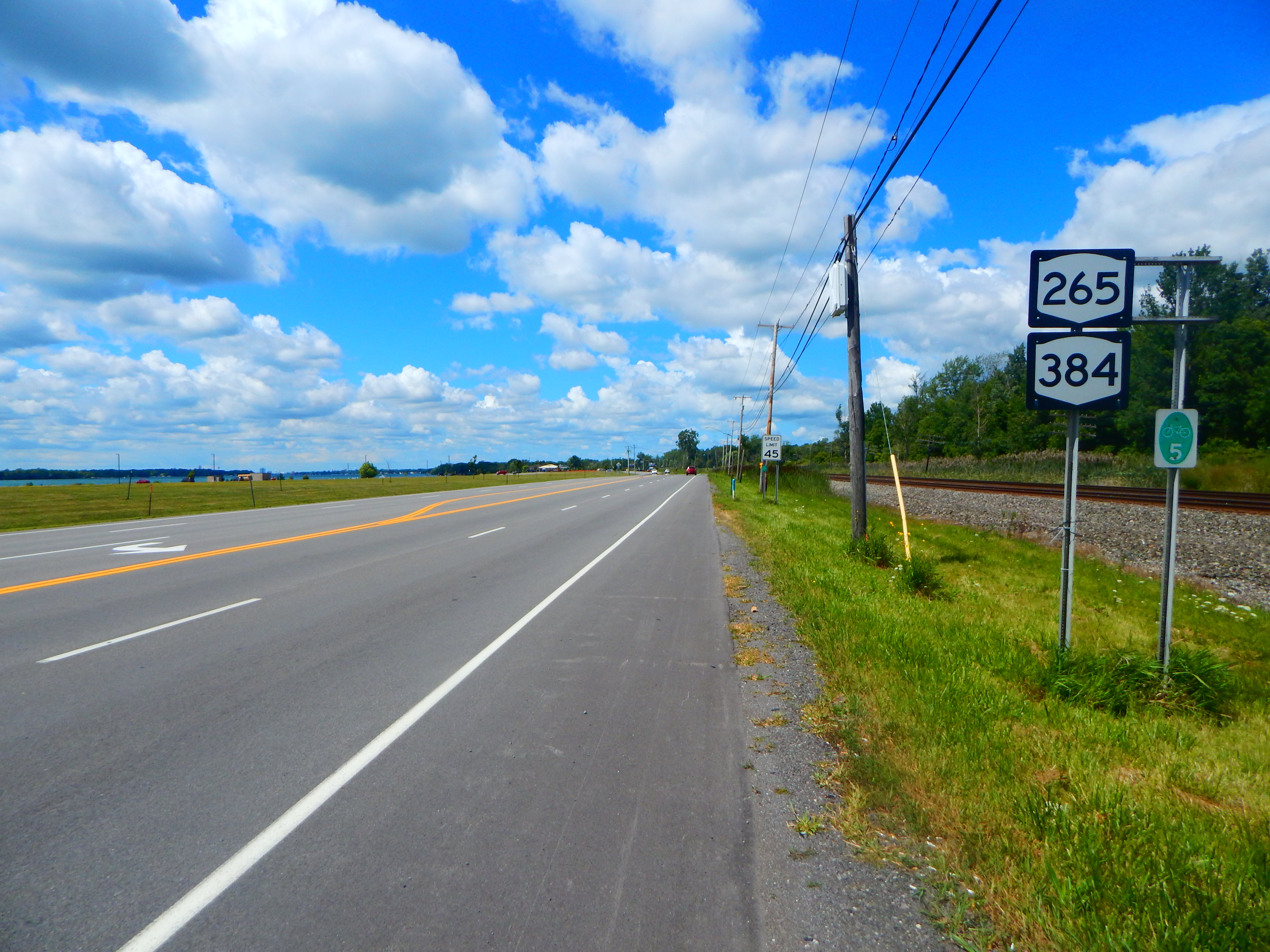
NY 384 and NY 265 northbound at Ward Road in North Tonawanda

Just northwest of the park, NY 265 and NY 384 turn westward and northwestward into the town of Wheatfield, becoming a two-lane residential street. Continuing a distance north of the river, the routes begin curving westward once again, passing north of a local mobile home park at a junction with Williams Road. Williams Road connects NY 265 and NY 384 to the LaSalle Expressway, which ends at Williams. Entering the city of Niagara Falls, the routes become known as Buffalo Avenue, paralleling the LaSalle into Griffon Park. At the junction with South Military Road, NY 384 continues west along Buffalo Avenue while NY 265 turns northward along South Military. Remaining in the shadows the LaSalle, NY 384 crosses over Cayuga Creek and enters the city center of Niagara Falls.

After crossing the creek, NY 384 reaches a ramp to the LaSalle, where the route and Buffalo Avenue turn southwest along Cayuga Creek. Proceeding southeast and away from the LaSalle, the route continues through the eastern edges of the city, passing numerous residences along the two-lane roadway. Around the junction with 79th Street, the route becomes more commercial in nature, making a large curve around the riverside into an interchange the terminus of the Niagara Scenic Parkway. Also in the middle of this interchange, NY 384 crosses under I-190 (the Niagara Thruway) and services exit 21 of the route. Running northeast along Buffalo Avenue, the route now begins to parallel the Niagara Scenic, entering the industrial section of the city near 53rd Street.

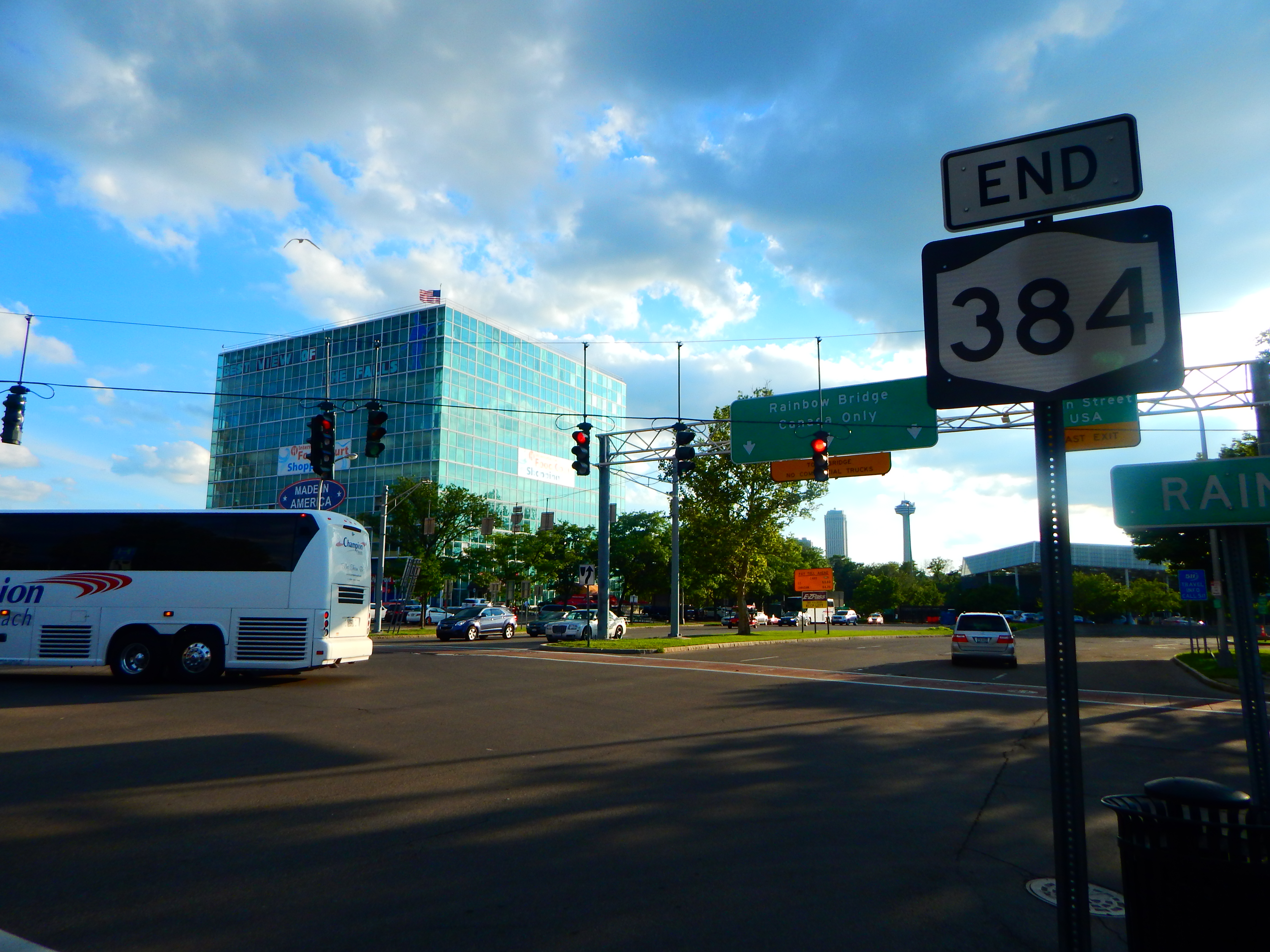
The end of NY 384 at Rainbow Street and the Rainbow Bridge approach

Crossing under the railroad tracks, NY 384 crosses northwest through multiple factories, passing a large railroad yard near Iroquois Street. A short distance after, the route crosses an intersection with the southern terminus of NY 61 (Hyde Park Boulevard). The route crosses west through Niagara Falls, crossing over a small railroad wye, and soon into another commercial street near Portage Road. Reaching a junction with Rainbow Boulevard, NY 384 runs northwest along Rainbow into an at-grade junction with the Niagara Scenic Parkway, which it runs north along John P. Daly Boulevard to a junction with Niagara Street, where it turns west onto Niagara. Beginning to parallel US 62, NY 384 runs west along Niagara Street, a four-lane commercial street.

NY 384 continues west for several blocks into an intersection with the western terminus of northbound NY 104 (First Street) in the center of Niagara Falls, just south of US 62. A block later, it crosses NY 104 south (Rainbow Boulevard), and enters a ramp towards the Rainbow Bridge. The NY 384 designation terminates at the junction with Rainbow Boulevard rather than continuing through Niagara Falls State Park onto the bridge to Ontario.

== History ==
In 1908, the New York State Legislature created Route 30, an unsigned legislative route extending across New York from Niagara Falls northeast to Rouses Point. By 1914, the definition of Route 30 was modified to include the portion of River Road and Main Street between the Niagara Falls city line and Island Street in North Tonawanda. This addition to Route 30 was removed on March 1, 1921. When the first set of posted routes in New York were assigned in 1924, none of the former North Tonawanda extension of Route 30 was assigned a designation.

NY 384 was assigned as part of the 1930 renumbering of state highways in New York to the primary riverside roadway between the cities of Buffalo and Niagara Falls. It began at Niagara Square in downtown Buffalo and followed Niagara Street north to the city of Tonawanda. From there, NY 384 followed Main Street into North Tonawanda, joining the former routing of Route 30 at Island Street. While Route 30 ended at the Niagara Falls city line, NY 384 continued west along Buffalo Avenue into downtown. The portion of Delaware Avenue and Grove Street from NY 324 in Kenmore to NY 384 in Tonawanda was designated as NY 266 c. 1935.

The alignments of NY 266 and NY 384 south of North Tonawanda were flipped c. 1936. However, unlike NY 266, NY 384 continued south on Delaware Avenue into downtown Buffalo, where it ended at Niagara Square as it had before. NY 384 was rerouted slightly by 1948 to follow Delaware Avenue through Tonawanda and across the Erie Canal to the modern junction of Main and Webster Streets, where it rejoined its previous alignment. The route was extended south through Niagara Square to its current terminus at NY 5 by 1970.

=== Niagara Falls ===
In Niagara Falls, NY 384 originally broke from Buffalo Avenue at 10th Street to follow Erie Avenue and Falls, Main, and Niagara Streets to the Niagara River, where it connected to the Honeymoon Bridge (replaced by the Rainbow Bridge in 1941) leading to Niagara Falls, Ontario. NY 384 was truncated by 1938 to the junction of Main and Niagara Streets following the assignment of U.S. Route 104, which followed Niagara Street to the bridge instead. In the 1970s, construction of the Niagara Falls Convention Center—which was built at the junction of Falls Street and Erie Avenue—severed NY 384's routing through the city. As a result, NY 384 was rerouted west of Quay Street (an arterial street connecting to the Robert Moses State Parkway) to follow Rainbow Boulevard through the southwestern portion of the city to NY 104 (Main Street).

Rainbow Boulevard was made up of what had been Union Avenue and First Street as well as a new north–south street constructed in the vicinity of Main Street. The new roadway and First Street served as a one-way couplet for NY 384: the new street became Rainbow Boulevard South and carried NY 384 southbound while First Street was renamed Rainbow Boulevard North and carried NY 384 northbound. Union Avenue, meanwhile, became a four-lane, two-way divided highway. At Quay Street (John B. Daly Boulevard), the Rainbow Boulevard name continued southeast over former Erie Avenue to Buffalo Avenue.

In December 2005, construction began on a project to convert the Rainbow Boulevard one-way couplet into dual-direction streets. As part of the project, the location where the dual-direction Rainbow Boulevard split into the parallel streets was turned into a roundabout while the name of Rainbow Boulevard North reverted to First Street. Rainbow Boulevard South, meanwhile, became Rainbow Boulevard. Work was completed on the conversion of both streets by August 2007, at which time NY 384 was rerouted onto John P. Daly Boulevard and Niagara Street through downtown to a new terminus at the Rainbow Bridge. John P. Daly Boulevard was originally designated as NY 952B while the portion of Niagara Street west of 5th Street was originally part of NY 951A; both unsigned reference route designations are unchanged as of 2009 despite the fact that both now overlap the signed NY 384 designation for part of their routing.

== Major intersections ==
County	Location	mi	km	Destinations	Notes
Erie	Buffalo	0.00	0.00	NY 5	Southern terminus
Erie	Buffalo	0.52	0.84	NY 5	
Erie	Buffalo	0.8	1.3	Niagara Street	Niagara Square
Erie	Buffalo	3.71	5.97	NY 198 (Scajaquada Expressway)	Interchange
Erie	Town of Tonawanda	6.88	11.07	NY 324 (Sheridan Drive)	
Erie	Town of Tonawanda	7.90	12.71	I-290 / Elmwood Avenue (CR 119 south)	Exit 1 (I-290); access to CR 119 via CR 306
Niagara	North Tonawanda	10.34	16.64	NY 265 south (River Road)	Southern terminus of NY 265 overlap
Niagara	North Tonawanda	10.74	17.28	NY 429 north (Wheatfield Road)	Southern terminus of NY 429
Niagara	Wheatfield	14.83	23.87	Williams Road (NY 952V north)	Southern terminus of unsigned NY 952V
Niagara	Niagara Falls	15.84	25.49	NY 265 north (South Military Road)	Northern terminus of NY 265 overlap
Niagara	Niagara Falls	16.04	25.81	LaSalle Expressway west to I-190	Interchange
Niagara	Niagara Falls	17.62	28.36	I-190 / LaSalle Expressway east / Niagara Scenic Parkway north – Seneca Niagara Casino, New York State Park, American Falls	Exit 21 (I-190)
Niagara	Niagara Falls	19.10	30.74	NY 61 north (Hyde Park Boulevard)	Southern terminus of NY 61
Niagara	Niagara Falls	20.82	33.51	Niagara Scenic Parkway south	Access via NY 952B
Niagara	Niagara Falls	21.69	34.91	Rainbow Boulevard (NY 954V west)	Eastern terminus of unsigned NY 954V
Niagara	Niagara Falls			NY 104 east (Main Street) – USA	Western terminus of NY 104
Niagara	Niagara Falls	21.79	35.07	Rainbow Bridge (NY 955A west) – Canada	Northern terminus
1.000 mi = 1.609 km; 1.000 km = 0.621 mi
