= North Grand Island Bridge =

Bridge in New York

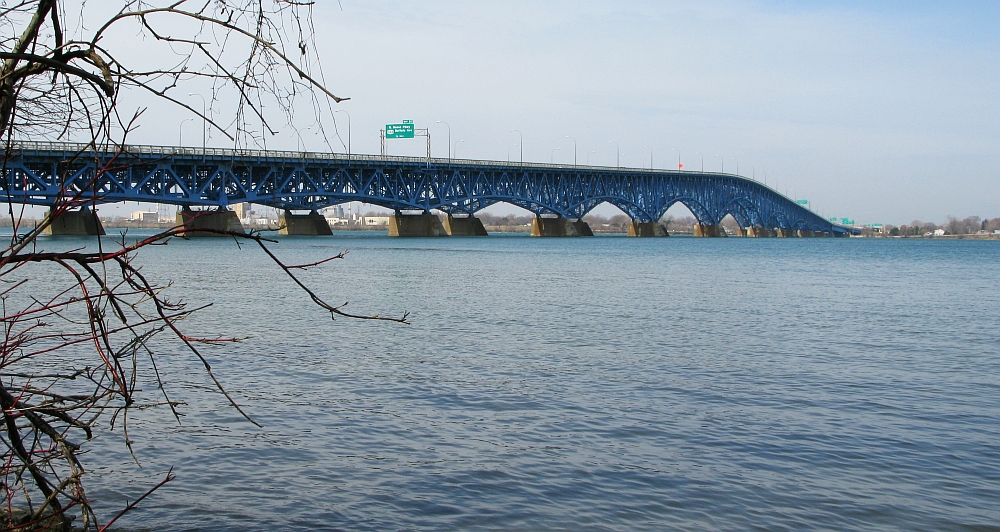
- The bridge as seen from Buckhorn Island State Park.
- Coordinates: 43°4′8″N 78°59′27″W
- Carries: 4 lanes of I-190 / NY 324
- Crosses: Niagara River
- Locale: Grand Island, New York and Niagara Falls, New York
- Maintained by: New York State Thruway Authority

Characteristics
- Design: Twin truss bridges
- Total length: 4,000 feet (1,219 m)
- Longest span: 153 m

History
- Opened: July 15, 1935 (northbound span); December 18, 1964 (southbound span)

Statistics
- Daily traffic: vehicular
- Toll: $1.75 (Southbound) (Tolls by Mail) $0.95 (E-ZPass)

Location
- Interactive map of North Grand Island Bridge

The North Grand Island Bridge is a pair of twin two-lane truss arch bridges spanning the Niagara River between Grand Island and Niagara Falls in New York, United States. Each bridge carries one direction of Interstate 190 (I-190). Both crossings are operated by the New York State Thruway Authority as part of the Niagara Thruway. The northbound span opened in 1935; the southbound span was finished in 1964.

A southbound-only toll is presently collected via open-road cashless tolling. The open-road tolling began operating on March 29, 2018, replacing conventional toll booths which were on Grand Island. The tollbooths were dismantled, and drivers are no longer able to pay cash at the bridge. Instead, drivers will travel beneath an overhead gantry where their E-ZPass transponder will be detected and charged. Drivers without an E-ZPass will have a picture of their license plate taken, and the toll bill will be mailed to them.
