= New York State Thruway Authority =

Public benefit corporation in New York, U.S.

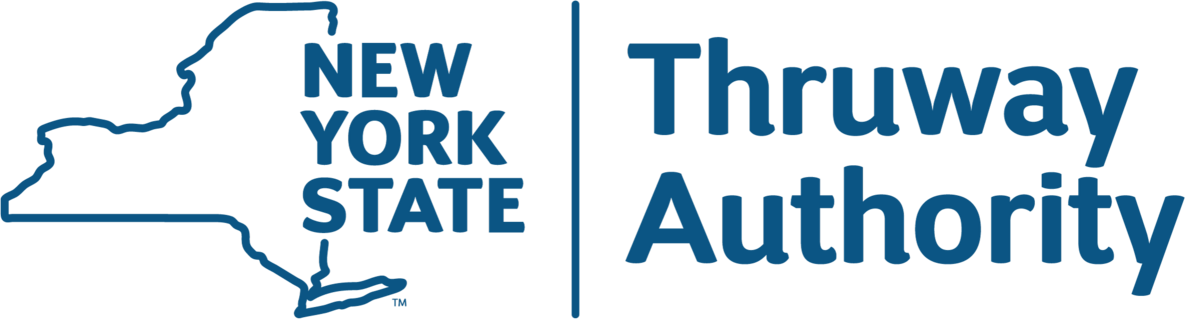

Authority overview
- Formed: 1950
- Jurisdiction: New York State Thruway
- Headquarters: Administrative Headquarters; 200 Southern Blvd. PO Box 189; Albany, NY 12201-0189
- Authority executives: Robert L. Megna, Chair; Frank G. Hoare, Executive Director
- Website: thruway.ny.gov

The New York State Thruway Authority (NYSTA) is a public benefit corporation in the U.S. state of New York. The NYSTA was formed in 1950 with the responsibility of constructing, maintaining, and operating the New York State Thruway, a system of limited-access highways within the state.

== Organization ==
In August 2017, Matthew J. Driscoll was appointed by Governor Andrew Cuomo as the Acting Executive Director of the New York State Thruway Authority. The executive officers report to a 6-member board of directors. In 2017, the authority had operating expenses of $872.17 million, an outstanding debt of $8.827 billion, and a staffing level of 3,754 people.

The authority operates without financial assistance from the state of New York. All debt is paid for through tolls and fees.

== History ==
=== Formation ===
A toll superhighway connecting the major cities of the state of New York that would become part of a larger nationwide highway network was proposed as early as 1949. Construction was initially administered by the state Department of Public Works, however in the following year, the New York State Legislature passed the Thruway Authority Act creating the New York State Thruway Authority, an independent public corporation, which would build and manage the Thruway. The project was to be financed through toll revenue bonds and self-liquidating by receipt of tolls, rents, concessions, and other income. The act also stipulated NYSTA adopt a hybrid system of tolls, with barrier tolls collected in urban areas, and long-distance tickets issued in rural areas.

=== System expansion ===
After the New Jersey Turnpike was built in 1952, the New Jersey Turnpike Authority (NJTA) and NYSTA proposed a 13-mile (21 km) extension of the New Jersey Turnpike that would go from its end (at US 46 in Ridgefield Park, New Jersey, at the time) up to West Nyack at the Thruway. The portion through New Jersey was to be constructed and maintained by NJTA, while the portion in New York was to be built and maintained by NYSTA. The purpose of this extension was to give motorists a "more direct bypass of the New York City area" to New England by using the Tappan Zee Bridge. The extension was to parallel NY 303 and the Conrail-owned River Line, and have limited interchanges, one of which would be with the Palisades Interstate Parkway. By 1970, it became too expensive to buy right-of-way access, and community opposition was fierce. Therefore, both the NJTA and NYSTA cancelled the project.

In 1990, the state of New York sold the Cross-Westchester Expressway (part of I-287) to NYSTA for $20 million (equivalent to $42.3 million in 2024) in an effort to balance the state's budget. Similarly, in 1991, the Authority was directed to assume the cost of operating and maintaining the 71-mile (114 km) segment of I-84 in New York, which runs east–west from the Pennsylvania state line at Port Jervis to the Connecticut state line at Brewster. The agreement made at this time between NYSTA and the New York State Department of Transportation (NYSDOT) allowed NYSTA to transfer I-84 back to the state at any point after 1996 provided that the Thruway Authority gave NYSDOT a one-year notice. Around this time, state officials also investigated the possibility of having NYSTA take over ownership and maintenance of all or part of New York's Interstate Highways.

=== Toll elimination and I-84 ===
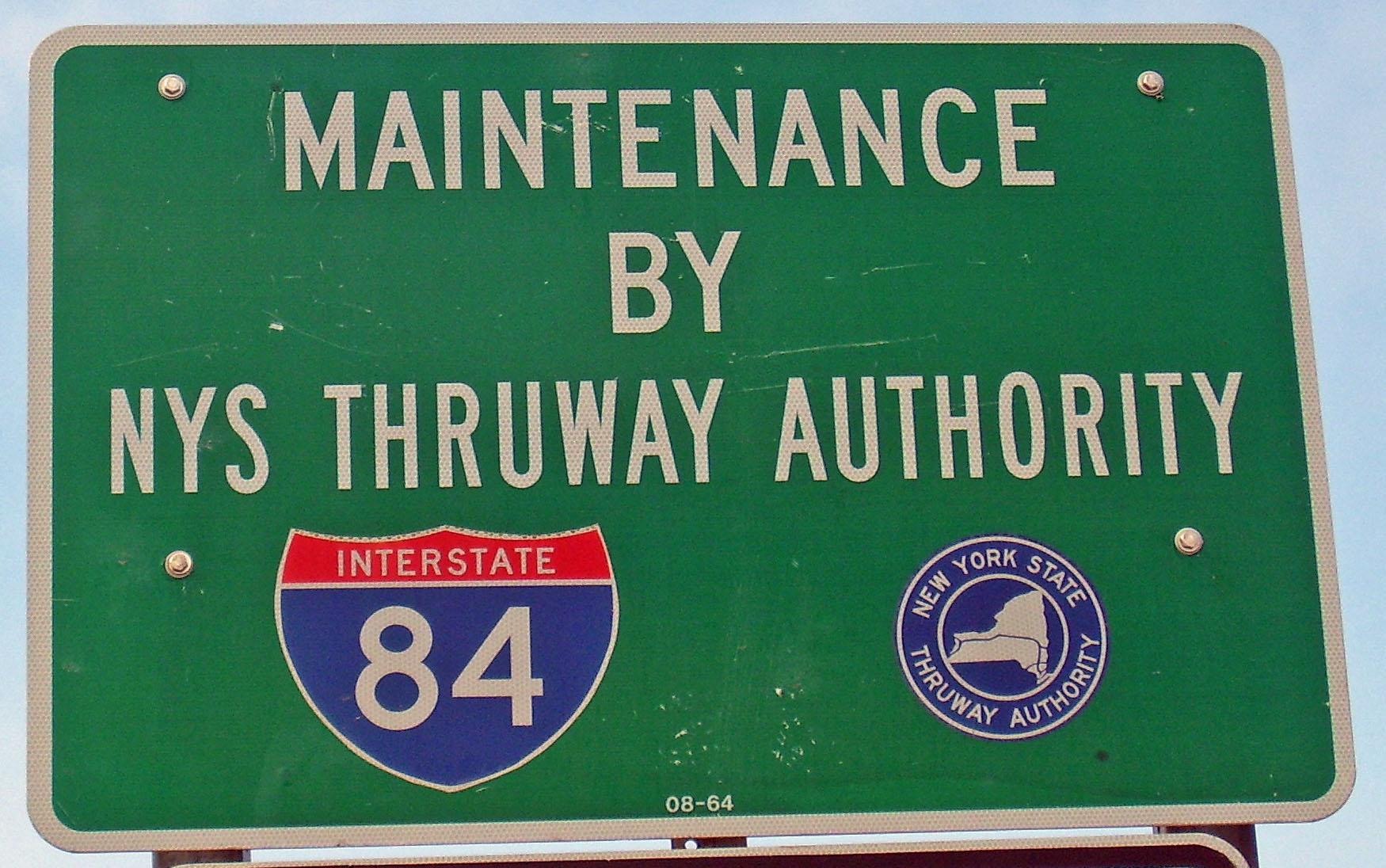
Thruway Authority maintenance sign at onramps on I-84

Roughly one week before the November 2006 elections, NYSTA accepted $14 million from the State Senate in exchange for agreeing to cease the collection of tolls at the Black Rock and City Line toll barriers on the Niagara Thruway (I-190) in Buffalo for one year. On October 30, 2006, NYSTA voted to permanently remove the tolls. Both major candidates in the 2006 gubernatorial election, Democrat and eventual victor Eliot Spitzer and Republican John Faso, had pledged to remove the tolls on I-190 if elected. In order to offset the lost toll revenue, NYSTA also voted to return maintenance of I-84 to NYSDOT, as the annual maintenance cost of I-84 was considered to be equal to the amount of annual revenue generated from the Buffalo toll barriers—approximately $14 million. Under the terms of the 1991 agreement between NYSTA and NYSDOT, maintenance of I-84 would become the responsibility of the DOT on October 30, 2007.

In January 2007, State Senator John Bonacic of Mount Hope began drafting legislation to halt the planned transfer of maintenance of I-84. Bonacic asserted that the Thruway Authority had better maintenance practices than NYSDOT, most notably in the field of snow removal. He also claimed that the DOT lacked the time and money needed to match the quality of maintenance that NYSTA performed on I-84. The senator eventually prevailed as the 2007–2008 budget was modified to allocate additional funding to NYSDOT, which would then pay the Thruway Authority to maintain I-84. A formal agreement between the two agencies was reached on September 19. The one-year agreement cost NYSDOT $11.5 million and took effect October 30, the date I-84 was to become DOT-maintained. The agreement was renewed in April 2008 at a cost of $10.3 million, extending the arrangement through October 31, 2009. It remained in place until October 11, 2010, when NYSDOT re-assumed maintenance of the highway. The change was made in the 2010–2011 state budget in an effort to reduce the cost of maintaining I-84. Governor David Paterson—who included the change in the budget—expected that the state would save $3.9 million annually on maintenance costs.

=== Canal maintenance ===
The NYSTA owned the New York State Canal Corporation from 1992 until 2017. Ownership was subsequently transferred to the New York Power Authority.

== Highway advisory radio ==
NYSTA also operates the Thruway Authority Highway Advisory Radio (HAR) system, a network of radio stations across the state that broadcast information on traffic conditions along the Thruway. The system broadcasts at 1610 AM in the Newburgh, Kingston, Albany, and Rochester areas, 1620 AM in the Herkimer, Verona, LaFayette, Syracuse, and Geneva/Waterloo areas, 530 AM in the New York City Region/Tappan Zee Bridge Corridor, and at 1630 AM in the Buffalo, Ripley, and Dunkirk areas. HAR is also used to broadcast Amber alerts if one is issued.

== See also ==
- New York State Canal Corporation
- New York Power Authority
