= Rainbow Tower =

Bell tower in Niagara Falls, Ontario, Canada

Coordinates: 43.0919°N 79.0702°W

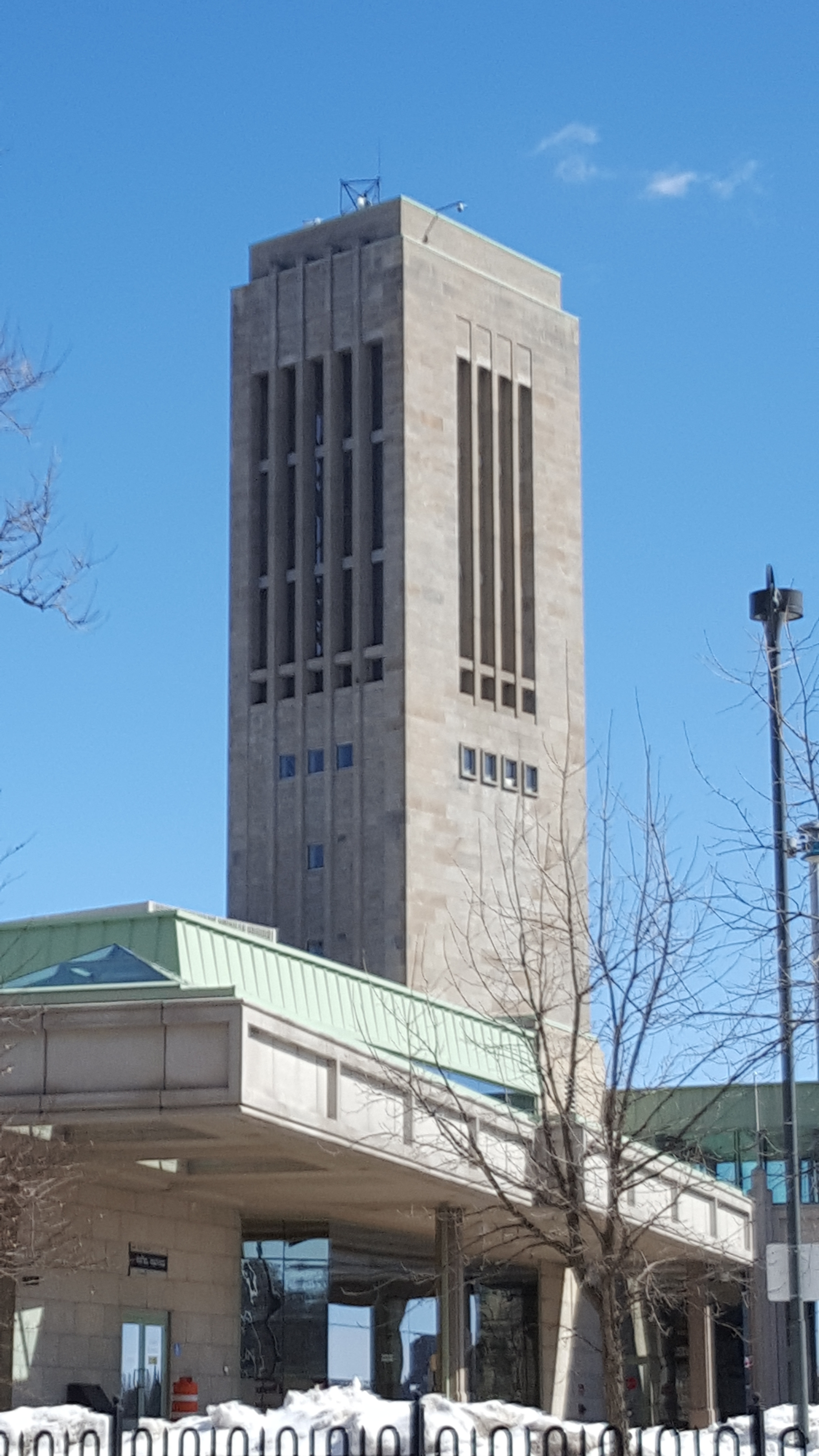
- Interactive map of the Rainbow Tower area

General information
- Type: Carillon Tower
- Location: Niagara Falls, Ontario, Canada
- Completed: 1947

Height
- Roof: 50.3 m (165 ft)

Technical details
- Lifts/elevators: 1

Design and construction
- Architect: William Lyon Somerville

The Rainbow Tower is a 50.3 metres (165 ft) tower located at the Rainbow Plaza Canada–United States border station of the Rainbow Bridge in Niagara Falls, Ontario, Canada. Construction on the tower was completed in 1947. The tower, part of the Canadian plaza of the bridge, was designed by Canadian architect William Lyon Somerville.

== The Rainbow Carillon ==
The Rainbow Tower housed a carillon—a musical instrument consisting of a baton keyboard that controls a series of bells. The Rainbow Carillon was sounded three times a day, 365 days a year. It featured 55 bells with a total weight of over 43 tons. The instrument was controlled via a series of 55 oak batons and 30 feet (9.1 m) pedals. The largest bell, called a bourdon, is 8 feet (2.4 m) in diameter and 6.5 feet (2.0 m) tall, weighing in at 10 tons. Musically the pitch of this bell is E. It contains an inscription that includes the phrase "to God's glory and in grateful memory of our nations' leaders Winston Spencer Churchill and Franklin Delano Roosevelt", which was seen as an affront to Canadian prime minister William Lyon Mackenzie King and led to Ontario premier George A. Drew dismissing all of the province's representatives to the Niagara Falls Bridge Commission. The smallest bell in the instrument weighs less than 9 pounds (4.1 kg) and has a circumference of 5.75 inches (146 mm).

The bell castings for the Rainbow Carillon were begun in 1941 by John Taylor Bellfounders of Loughborough, England, but interrupted by the onset of World War II. Work on the instrument resumed in 1945 and was completed by 1947.

When the tower was built it contained a small apartment for the resident carillonneur. The bells were silenced for renovations from 1998 to 2001 and by 2002, the Niagara Falls Bridge Commission had replaced the resident carillonneur with a fully automated system. The instrument can still be played manually, but is mostly automated to allow for frequent playing.

In March 2025, work began to decommission the carillon and remove the bells from the tower. Though no official release has been made public by the Niagara Falls Bridge Commission, it is believed that the instrument's frame could no longer safely support the weight of the bells. Scaffolding could be seen erected upon the southeast face of the tower until late summer of 2025 when work was completed. It is alleged that the bells are now in storage, without any publicly known plan as to what is to become of them.

== Carillonneurs ==
Several Canadians and at least two Americans (Kleinschmidt and Werblow) have served as carillonneurs:

- Robert B. Kleinschmidt (1910-1959) 1948-1959
- John Leland Richardson (1906-1969) 1960-1969
- Gordon Frederick Slater (1950-) 1972-1975
- Robert Donnell (1910-1986) 1975-1976
- June Somerville 1976-1992
- Gloria Werblow 1986-1998

== In film ==
The Rainbow Tower was featured in the 1953 Marilyn Monroe thriller Niagara. Scenes were filmed outside the base of the tower, combined with sound stage footage. The long "tracking" shot of Marilyn Monroe was completed in one shot, unique in "Three-Strip" Technicolor.

== See also ==
- List of carillons

== Sources ==
- "The bells of Niagara have historic ring; REDISCOVERING NIAGARA". Niagara Falls Review.

- http://www.towerbells.org/data/ONNIFARB.HTM
