= Ontario Highway 420 =

Controlled-access highway in Ontario

Highway 420
- Niagara Veterans Memorial Highway
- Highway 420 highlighted in red

Route information
- Maintained by Ministry of Transportation of Ontario
- Length: 3.3 km (2.1 mi)
- History: November 1, 1941 (as Queen Elizabeth Way); April 1972 (as Highway 420)

Highway 420
- West end: Regional Road 98 (Montrose Road)
- Major intersections: Queen Elizabeth Way
- East end: Regional Road 102 (Stanley Avenue)

Niagara Regional Road 420
- West end: Regional Road 102 (Stanley Avenue)
- East end: NY 384 / NY 104 at the Rainbow Bridge to United States

Location
- Country: Canada
- Province: Ontario
- Major cities: Niagara Falls

Highway system
- Ontario provincial highways; Current; Former; 400-series
| ← Highway 418 | → Highway 427 |

King's Highway 420, commonly referred to as Highway 420, is a 400-series highway in the Canadian province of Ontario that connects the Queen Elizabeth Way (QEW) with downtown Niagara Falls. It continues east as a limited-access expressway named Niagara Regional Road 420 to connect with the Rainbow Bridge international crossing between Canada and the United States over the Niagara River; this expressway was part of Highway 420 until 1998. West of the QEW, the freeway ends at an at-grade intersection with Montrose Road (Niagara Regional Road 98).

Originally constructed as a divided four-lane road with two roundabouts, the route of Highway 420 formed part of the QEW in 1940 initially as the southeastern terminus, but after the QEW extension from Niagara Falls to Fort Erie opened in 1941, this bypassed highway became a spur route designated as the Rainbow Bridge Approach. It was assigned a unique route number as part of the 400-series after being upgraded into a freeway in 1972, including construction of a large interchange with the QEW. In 1998, the section of Highway 420 east of Stanley Avenue was transferred to the responsibility of the Regional Municipality of Niagara and redesignated as Regional Road 420.

The speed limit is 80 km/h (50 mph), the only 400-series highway to have such a limit for its entire length. The route is patrolled by the Ontario Provincial Police (OPP) and maintained by the Ministry of Transportation of Ontario (MTO).

== Route description ==
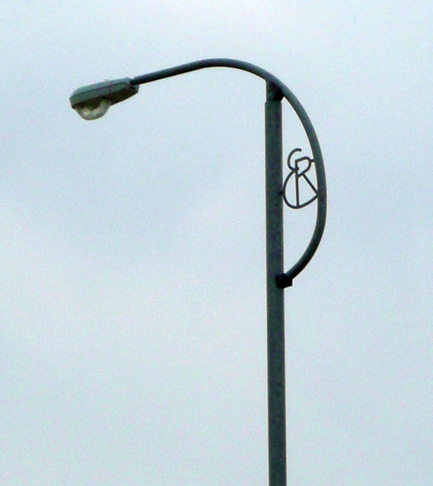
An "ER" lightpost along Highway 420, recounting the route's historical connection to the QEW

At 3.3 km (2.1 mi), Highway 420 is the shortest 400-series highway, travelling through Niagara Falls from Montrose Road to Stanley Avenue, on the outskirts of the city's tourist district. East of Stanley Avenue (Regional Road 102) the highway becomes Niagara Regional Road 420 and is known as Falls Avenue and Newman Hill on approach to the Rainbow Bridge. This portion was designated a part of Highway 420 until 2000, when it was transferred to the City of Niagara Falls and the Regional Municipality of Niagara, although the Ministry of Transportation of Ontario (MTO) still assists with the maintenance of it under a Connecting Link agreement. East of Drummond Road, Highway 420 features stylized light fixtures with the letters "ER", which stand for Elizabeth Regina and are a tribute to Queen Elizabeth The Queen Mother.

Highway 420 begins in the west at a signalized intersection with Montrose Road (Regional Road 98), beyond which it continues as Watson Street through the residential neighbourhood of Greens Corners to Beaverdams Road (Regional Road 53). East of Montrose Road, the highway is a four lane roadway divided by a raised paved median, and passes north of a forest as it approaches a four-level interchange with the QEW. The five parclo ramps provide almost all directional movements, though the QEW off-ramps meet Highway 420 at at-grade intersections. These at-grade connections can be bypassed by a pair of connectors carried by a dual on-and-off ramp flyover that arcs over the CN rail line and the QEW Toronto-bound carriageway, directing Fort Erie-bound QEW traffic onto Highway 420 eastbound and westbound Highway 420 traffic onto the Toronto-bound QEW. Another set of ramps links Toronto-bound QEW traffic to Highway 420 eastbound and Highway 420 westbound to the Fort Erie-bound QEW.

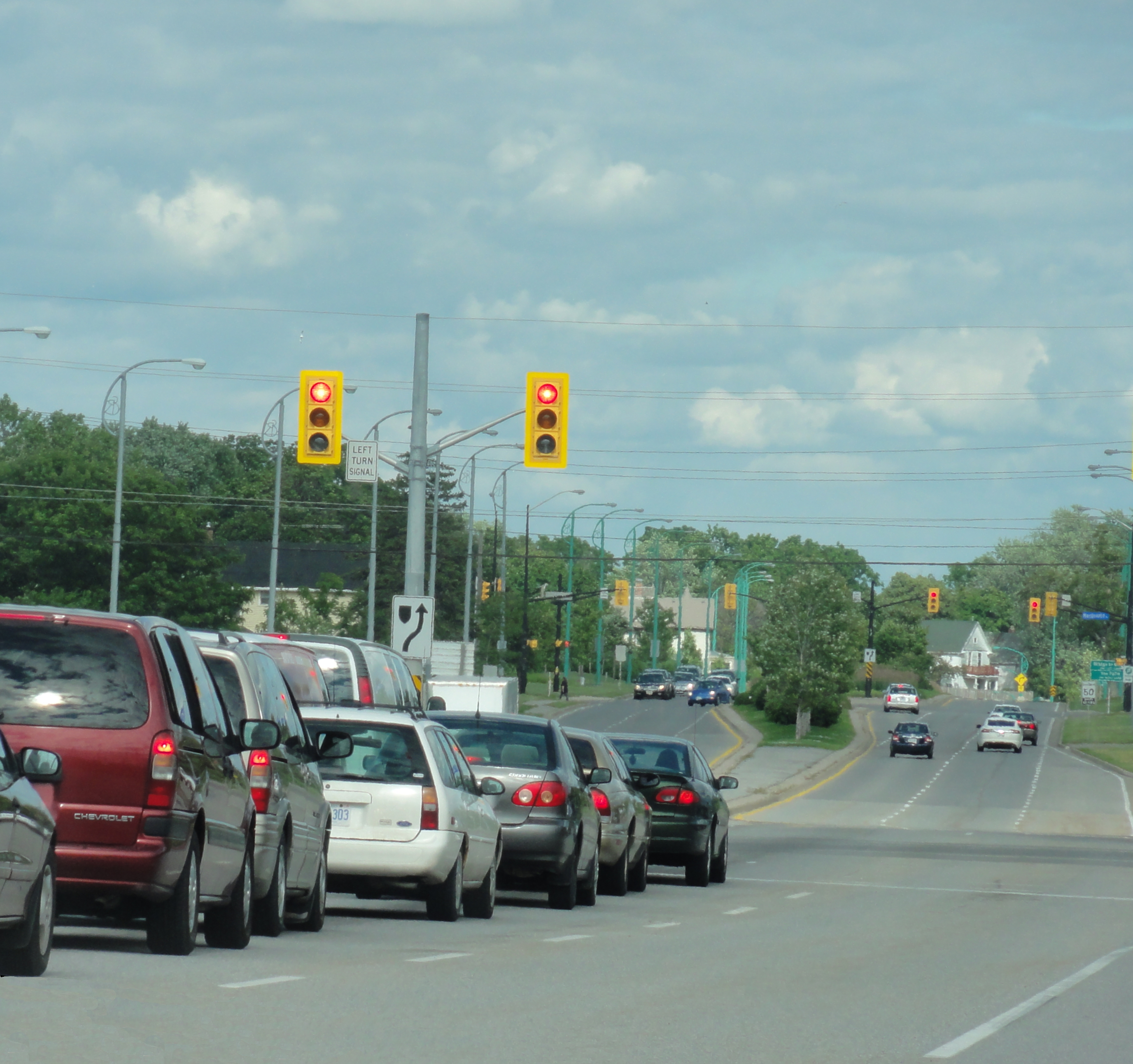
A view of Regional Road 420 proceeding east past Stanley Avenue at the terminus of Highway 420

East of the QEW, Highway encounters an interchange with Dorchester Road as both cross the Queenston-Chippawa Power Canal. This interchange was originally a traffic circle that was removed in the early 1970s. The numerous lanes from the QEW interchange to the west begin to converge between residential subdivisions east of Dorchester Road, gradually narrowing to four through lanes at the Drummond Road interchange. After passing beneath Portage Road, the route widens on approach to an at-grade intersection with Stanley Avenue. This intersection is the eastern end of both the freeway segment of the route and the signed King's Highway 420; east of Stanley Avenue the route is signed as Niagara Regional Road 420 and known as Falls Avenue.

Now separated by a landscaped median, the route progresses eastward, intersecting MacDonald Avenue and providing access to several residential and retail properties that adjoin the road. The route travels within a concrete trench and abruptly curves to the southeast as it passes beneath Victoria Avenue, with which there is a simple interchange. East of this point, the road was named Newman Hill until March 2012. Palmer Avenue and Ontario Avenue pass over the route as it descends a hill towards the Niagara Gorge. At the bottom, the route curves to the southwest, where it provides access to the Rainbow Bridge border crossing into the United States as well as the tourist district of the city.

Owing to its association with the number 420 in cannabis culture, Highway 420 is also the location for the annual Cannabis Conference and Protest, usually taking place sometime around April 20. The event includes a march beginning near Niagara Falls and travelling to Highway 420.

== History ==
=== Rainbow Bridge Approach ===
Construction of the Roberts Street link between the QEW and the Rainbow Bridge, February 13, 1941

Similar angle in the spring of 1942

The history of Highway 420 predates its designation by nearly 75 years, tied in with the crossing of the Niagara Gorge between the twin cities of Niagara Falls, Ontario and Niagara Falls, New York. The first level crossing between the two cities was the Honeymoon Bridge, constructed in 1898. The 14 m (46 ft) wide structure spanned 255 m (837 ft) between the Canadian and American sides, 58 m (190 ft) above the Niagara River. Its narrow design proved to be a fatal flaw, and on January 27, 1938, under the weight of a massive ice jam in the river, the structure collapsed. A day later, the owners of the previous bridge—the International Railway Company (IRC)—as well as Ontario Minister of Highways Thomas Baker McQuesten announced intentions to construct a new span; a long political battle ensued for several years over the merits of private or public ownership of border crossings. In the end, the Niagara Falls Bridge Commission (NFBC) paid the IRC $615,000 to purchase the right-of-way of the old bridge as well as the rights to construct the new one. The future Rainbow Bridge was dedicated by King George VI and Queen Elizabeth on June 7, 1939, just hours after the couple dedicated the QEW.

On May 16, 1940, Samuel Johnson, the vice-chair of the NFBC, and McQuesten, who along with his parliamentary role was chair of the commission, ceremonially turned the first sod for the new bridge using a two-handled shovel. Construction had begun two weeks earlier on May 4. The new bridge was assembled over the following 18 months; the design was prepared by New York engineering firm Waddell & Hardesty and supervised by the Edward Lupfer Corporation, the latter the designers of the Peace Bridge. The new structure was located 167 m (548 ft) downstream from the Honeymoon Bridge, as the gorge is slightly wider at that point, resulting in a 288 m (945 ft) span.

Meanwhile, McQuesten was overseeing construction of the QEW between Toronto and Fort Erie. The new dual highway, inspired by German Autobahns, was the first of its kind in Canada. (Note: Cootes Drive in Hamilton is also claimed as the first dual highway in Canada, although the QEW was the first divided highway designed for long-distance travel.) The outbreak of World War II in September 1939 temporarily halted McQuesten's ambitions, as funding was quickly shifted to the war effort. As a result, construction on the new superhighway was put on hold south of Niagara Falls. McQuesten officially opened the QEW on August 23, 1940; the pavement ended south of Lundy's Lane. Despite the war, work began on a link between the opened QEW and the Rainbow Bridge through the centre of Niagara Falls. This link would not be completed in time for the opening of the new bridge.

On November 1, 1941, the Rainbow Bridge was officially opened during a simple ceremony. The oldest living couple known to have wed in Niagara Falls, a pair from Pennsylvania, were the first to cross, followed by a newlywed couple from Georgia. This symbolically tied the history of the two bridges together, and was followed by McQuesten and Johnson walking towards the centre of the structure from the Canadian and American sides, respectively, and shaking hands at the centre. Several pyrotechnic explosions at both ends capped the ceremony, and the bridge was opened to traffic.

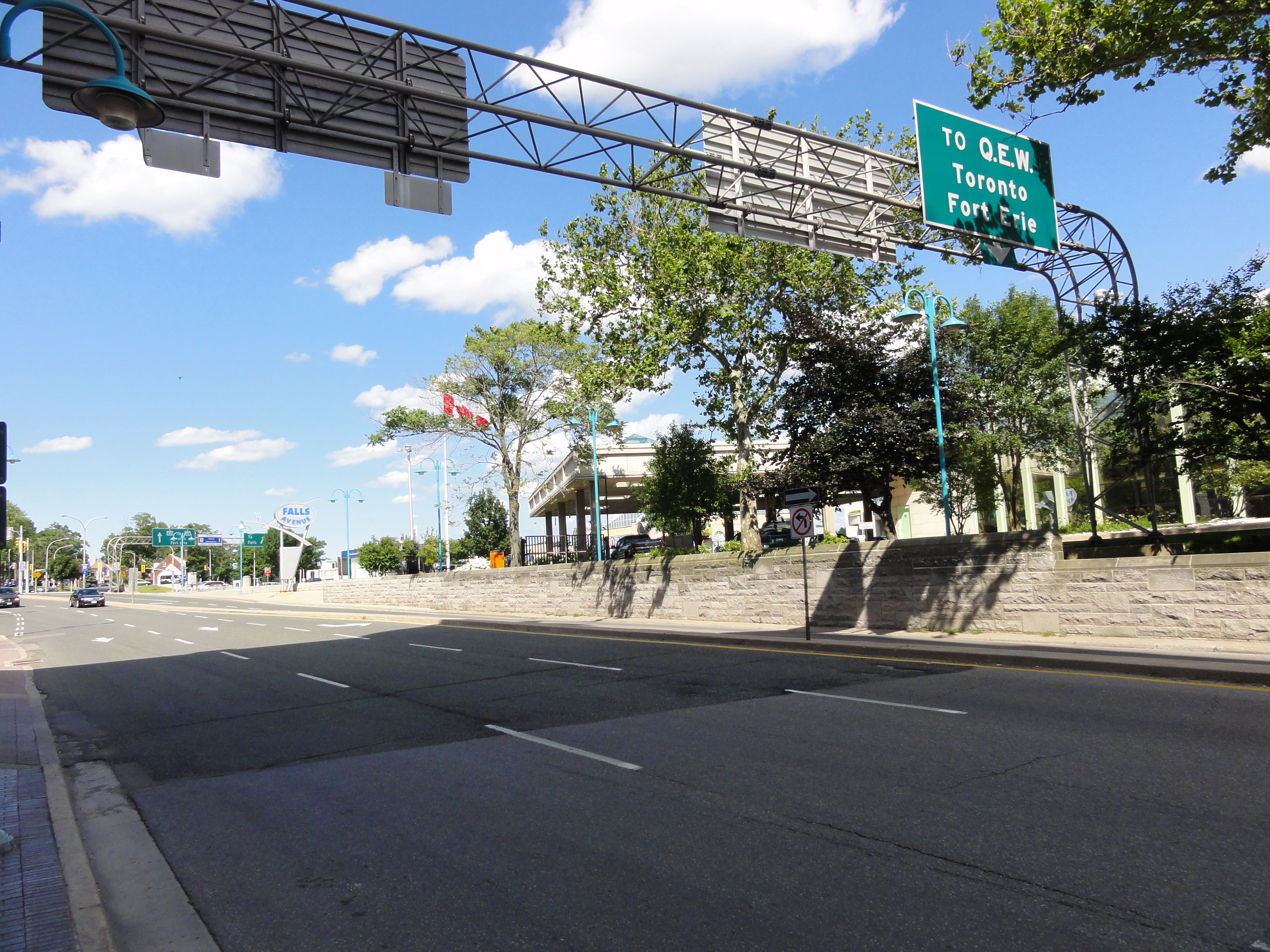
Regional Route 420's terminus at Falls Avenue in Niagara Falls near the Rainbow Bridge and Clifton Hill

Work continued on the four lane bridge approach throughout 1941, and by mid-1942 it was possible to drive directly from the bridge onto the QEW. The new link featured a traffic circle at Dorchester Road as well as at the QEW. At the time the new link was designated temporarily as part of the QEW (decades before receiving its own unique route number of Highway 420), as a result it was referred to by several names including the Queen Elizabeth Way Extension (and known by locals for decades as the "Queen E Extension") and the Rainbow Bridge Approach.

At the same time construction on QEW between Niagara Falls and Fort Erie, was underway, but the ongoing war delayed its completion. As an interim measure, four gravel lanes of the highway was opened during the summer of 1941, then two lanes of pavement were laid in 1946, and the four-lane extension was fully paved and opened on October 14, 1956. Bypassed by the new QEW extension to Fort Erie in 1941, the Niagara Falls bridge approach became a spur route that was no longer part of the QEW so it was officially named the Rainbow Bridge Approach for the next three decades.

=== Upgrade to freeway ===
During the mid-1960s, the Department of Highways examined the possibility of extending the freeway portion of the route east towards the Rainbow Bridge. They began to purchase properties lining Roberts Street in 1966. In 1971, construction began on a four-level interchange between the QEW and the Rainbow Bridge Approach. This removed the two traffic circles along the approach. The interchange between the QEW and Lundy's Lane (Highway 20) was also removed; instead, the Rainbow Bridge Approach ends with an at-grade intersection with Montrose Road which in turn connects to Lundy's Lane. By April 1972, the Rainbow Bridge Approach was designated as Highway 420.

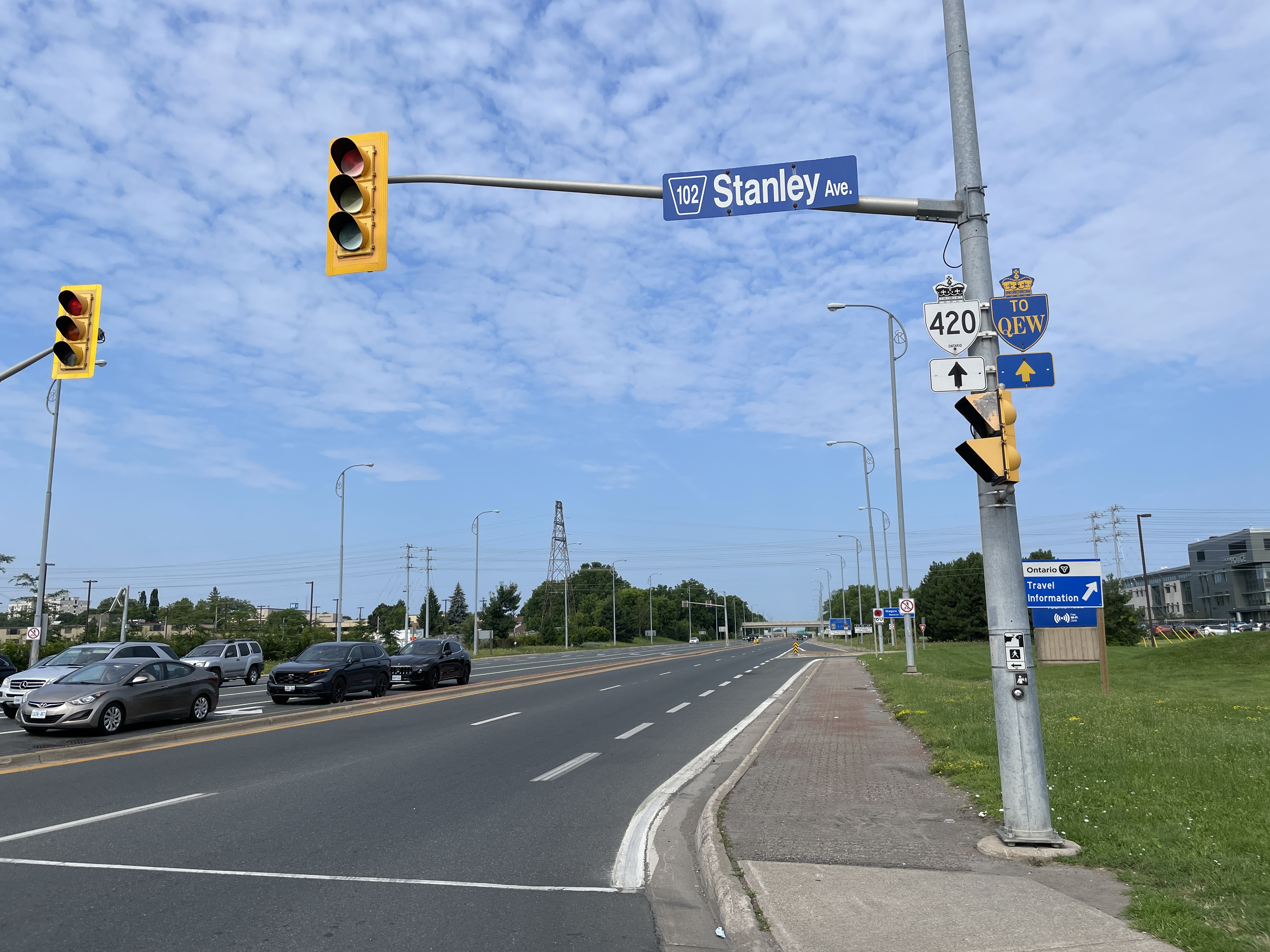
Highway 420 westbound past Niagara Regional Road 102 in Niagara Falls, when it becomes a freeway until the QEW

In 1998, the Niagara Falls Transportation Study was released, recommending that Roberts Street be rebuilt as a gateway to the city as opposed to a freeway. Highway 420 east of Stanley Avenue was transferred to Niagara Region and redesignated as Niagara Regional Road 420, but despite no longer being a provincial route it is still colloquially referred to as Highway 420. In the early 2000s, Highway 420 from the QEW interchange to Drummond Road was reconstructed with high-mast lighting poles and an Ontario tall-wall concrete median Jersey barrier, similar to the upgrades that other high-traffic provincial freeways received around that time. The rest of the route from Drummond Road eastwards (including Regional Road 420) was instead upgraded to 15-metre (49 ft) and 12-metre (39 ft) decorative "ER" lightposts, to commemorate the route's historical status as the original routing of the QEW and its historical tie to the Queen Mother. The "ER" style lighting poles are themselves a historical decorative lighting pole model, discontinued decades earlier, that was revived originally for the early 2000s Highway 420 reconstruction and would also be later used for QEW's bridges in Mississauga, Oakville, and St. Catherines. The Drummond Road and Portage Road overpasses that originally built in 1941 and rehabilitated in the early 1970s were demolished in 2004; their new replacement bridges plus Highway 420's concrete median barrier feature decorative stone facades, which in combination with the "ER" light poles restores the heritage look that was lost in the 1970s reconstruction.

On September 23, 2010, Highway 420 was designated as the Niagara Veterans Memorial Highway. On January 31, 2012, Niagara Regional Council approved the renaming of Roberts Street and Newman Hill as an extension of Falls Avenue, beginning March 1. Prior to this, Falls Avenue curved into Newman Hill at the Rainbow Bridge.

In 2016, the flyovers of the Highway 420-QEW interchange were rehabilitated.

== Exit list ==
The following table lists the major junctions along Highway 420, as noted by the Ministry of Transportation of Ontario. The entire route is located in the Regional Municipality of Niagara. All exits are unnumbered.

| Location | km | mi | Destinations | Notes |
|---|---|---|---|---|
| Niagara Falls | 0.0 | 0.0 | Regional Road 98 (Montrose Road) | At-grade; western terminus of Highway 420; continues as Watson Street |
| Niagara Falls | 0.4 | 0.25 | Queen Elizabeth Way – Toronto | Westbound exit and eastbound entrance; QEW exit 30 |
| Niagara Falls | 1.1 | 0.68 | Dorchester Road | |
| Niagara Falls | 2.2 | 1.4 | Drummond Road | |
| Niagara Falls | 3.3 | 2.1 | Regional Road 102 (Stanley Avenue) Regional Road 420 begins (Falls Avenue) | At-grade; present-day eastern terminus of Highway 420; continues as Regional Road 420 (Falls Avenue), maintained as a Connecting Link |
| Niagara Falls | 4.8 | 3.0 | Rainbow Bridge Border Crossing | |
| Niagara River; Canada–United States border | 4.8 | 3.0 | Rainbow Bridge | |
| Niagara River; Canada–United States border | 4.8 | 3.0 | NY 955A east to NY 104 east / NY 384 south / Niagara Scenic Parkway – Niagara Falls | Continuation into New York (state); former Highway 420 eastern terminus |
1.000 mi = 1.609 km; 1.000 km = 0.621 mi: Closed/former; Incomplete access; Route transition

Highway 420 crosses through Niagara Falls, becoming Regional Road 420 at Stanley Avenue before descending Clifton Hill to cross the Rainbow Bridge. In this aerial photo, the highway is visible beginning at the top left and across the majority of the image before abruptly turning towards the bridge crossing the river.
