= 1939 royal tour of Canada =

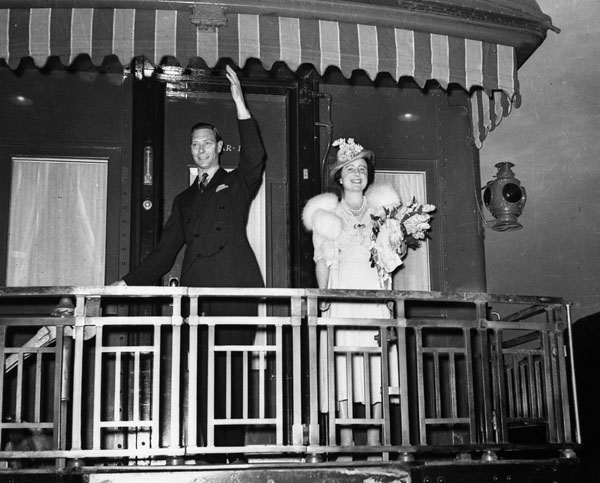
King George VI and Queen Elizabeth on the platform of the Royal Train which carried them across vast parts of Canada during their 1939 royal tour.

King George VI and Queen Elizabeth made their visit to Canada from 17 May to 15 June 1939. Taking place in the months leading up to the Second World War, the tour was undertaken to strengthen trans-Atlantic support for the United Kingdom in anticipation of a potential war while also showcasing Canada's status as an independent Dominion of the British Empire.

The King and Queen arrived in Canada by ship, and travelled up the St. Lawrence River to Quebec City before heading west by rail. Accompanied throughout by Canadian Prime Minister William Lyon Mackenzie King, they visited most major cities across Canada, reaching as far west as Victoria, British Columbia. On their return journey east, they briefly travelled to the United States for a state visit and a meeting with President Franklin D. Roosevelt. The royal tour concluded with visits to the Maritimes, after which they departed from Halifax for a tour of the then-separate Dominion of Newfoundland.

Although royal family members had previously toured Canada, the 1939 royal tour marked the first time a reigning monarch of Canada visited North America, garnering significant attention from both the public and the media.

== Background and planning ==
Governor General Lord Tweedsmuir, in an effort to foster Canadian identity, conceived of a royal tour by the country's monarchs; the Dominion Archivist (i.e., official historian) Gustave Lanctot wrote that this "probably grew out of the knowledge that at his coming Coronation, George VI was to assume the additional title of King of Canada." Tweedsmuir's desire was to demonstrate with living example the fact of Canada's status as an independent kingdom, having Canadians "see their King performing royal functions, supported by his Canadian ministers." Prime Minister Mackenzie King, while in London for the coronation in May 1937, formally consulted with the King on the matter. According to biographer Janet Adam Smith, the task for Tweedsmuir, and the Canadian government, was "how to translate the Statute of Westminster into the actualities of a tour... since this was the first visit of a reigning monarch to a Dominion, and precedents were being made." The tour was also designed to bolster trans-Atlantic support for Britain in the event of war, and to affirm Canada's status as an independent kingdom, sharing with Britain the same person as monarch.

Elizabeth's mother had died in 1938, and so Norman Hartnell designed an all-white wardrobe for her delayed state visit to France that year. In Canada in 1939 she wore elements of this white mourning, which forms a distinctive feature of the black and white photographs of the tour.

== First portion of the tour (17 May – 7 June) ==
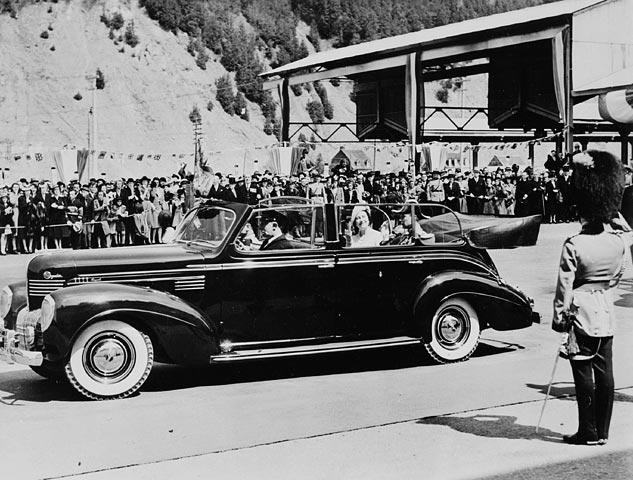
George VI and Elizabeth depart from Wolfe's Cove to begin their tour of Canada.

The first portion of the royal tour occurred from 17 May 1939, when the royal couple arrived in Quebec City, to 7 June 1939, when George VI and Mackenzie King departed Canada to conduct a state visit to the United States. The first portion of the Canadian royal tour, saw the royal couple visit every province in Canada, excluding the provinces in Atlantic Canada, which was toured following George VI and Mackenzie King's return from the United States on 12 June.

=== Arrival in Quebec ===
The arrangements were made, and on 17 May 1939, the royal couple arrived in Quebec City for their tour of Canada on board the Canadian Pacific liner RMS Empress of Australia; the reception at Quebec City, Trois-Rivières, and Montreal were positive beyond expectations, and the King impressed Quebeckers when he responded to the welcoming remarks in French.

The king and queen took up residence at La Citadelle, where the King performed his first official tasks, amongst which was the acceptance of the credentials of Daniel Calhoun Roper as the American envoy to Canada. The King also held the audience with Quebeckers in the Legislative Council chamber of the Parliament Building. Two Boer War veterans of Scottish heritage, in order to settle an argument, asked the Queen when presented to her: "Are you Scots, or are you English?" Elizabeth's response was reported as being: "Since I have landed in Quebec, I think we can say that I am Canadian."

=== Ontario ===
==== Ottawa ====
The royal party traveled to Ottawa on 20 May, where the Queen laid the cornerstone of the Supreme Court building. In her speech, she said, "perhaps it is not inappropriate that this task should be performed by a woman; for woman's position in a civilized society has depended upon the growth of law." The King dedicated the National War Memorial in front of 10,000 war veterans (among whom the Queen requested she be able to walk,) and the couple went to Parliament. There, the King personally granted royal assent to nine bills in the traditional manner which was still being used in Canada at the time – in the United Kingdom, Royal Assent has not been granted by the Sovereign in person since 1854.

On Parliament Hill, the King's official Canadian birthday (known today as Victoria Day) was marked for the first time with a traditional Trooping of the Colour. Because he attended this parade instead of the annual trooping on Horse Guards Parade, the one in London was presided by Prince Henry, Duke of Gloucester. Queen Elizabeth and Governor General Lord Tweedsmuir watched the parade from East Block. The King was accompanied at the reviewing box by Prime Minister Mackenzie King, Minister of National Defence Ian Alistair Mackenzie and the Chief of the General Staff, Lieutenant General Ernest Charles Ashton. The trooping saw members of the Governor General's Foot Guards from Ottawa and the Canadian Grenadier Guards from Montreal, both of which make up the Brigade of Canadian Guards, parade before the King.

==== Toronto and the Niagara region ====
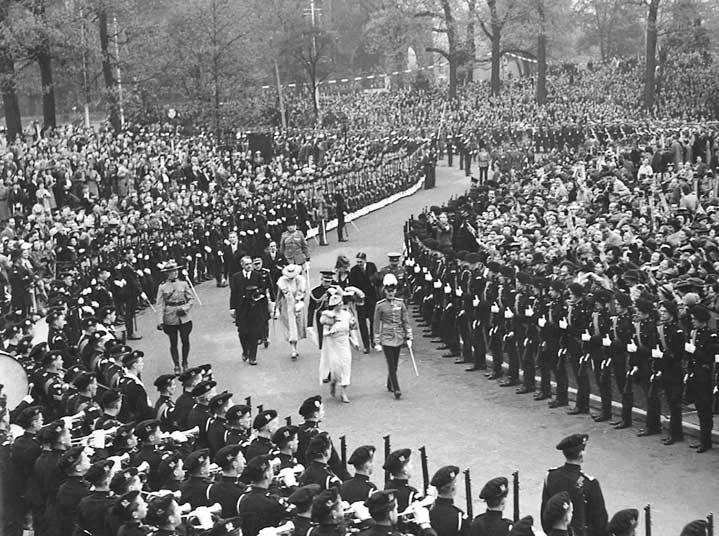
George VI and Elizabeth walk a procession route in Toronto.

After two days in Ottawa, the royal couple began travelling westward. The couple travelled to Toronto on 22 May, where they attended the King's Plate horse race and dedicated Coronation Park. The couple dedicated the soon-to-be completed Rainbow Bridge at Niagara Falls, and unveiled a monument at the site to mark the occasion. They also inaugurated the Queen Elizabeth Way (which was named for George's royal consort) as well as various monuments along the route, including a set of decorative stone pillars on the eastern approach to the Henley Bridge in St. Catharines, each consisting of a regal lion bearing a unique shield, and the Queen Elizabeth Way Monument, which had inscribed on its base words prophetically referring to the hostilities that would break out later that year:

The Queen Elizabeth Way was opened by the King and Queen in June, 1939, marking the first visit of a reigning sovereign to a sister Dominion of the Empire. The courage and resolution of Their Majesties in undertaking the royal visit in face of imminent war have inspired the people of this province to complete this work in the Empire's darkest hour, in full confidence of victory and a feeling of lasting peace.

=== Westward leg ===
The Royal Train was operated by the Canadian Pacific Railway on the western leg of the tour and the couple continued to be greeted by throngs of Canadians, even in the immigrant-rich but Depression-battered Prairies.

==== Manitoba ====
The couple visited Winnipeg and Brandon on 24 May. Upon their arrival in Winnipeg, on the King's Official Birthday, the royal couple was greeted by an estimated 100,000 people (including several thousand Americans), and, to allow them all a view of himself and the Queen, the King requested that the convertible roof of their limousine be opened, despite a record rainfall that day. While staying at Government House in Winnipeg, the King made his longest-ever radio broadcast to the British Empire; the table at which he sat remains in the Aides Room of the royal residence.

Then, Prime Minister Mackenzie King described the arrival of the royal train at Brandon: "Wonderful cheering. A long bridge overhead crowded with people. The hour: 11 at night... the finest scene on the entire trip." The Queen herself said the reception was "the biggest thrill of the tour."

==== Saskatchewan and Alberta ====
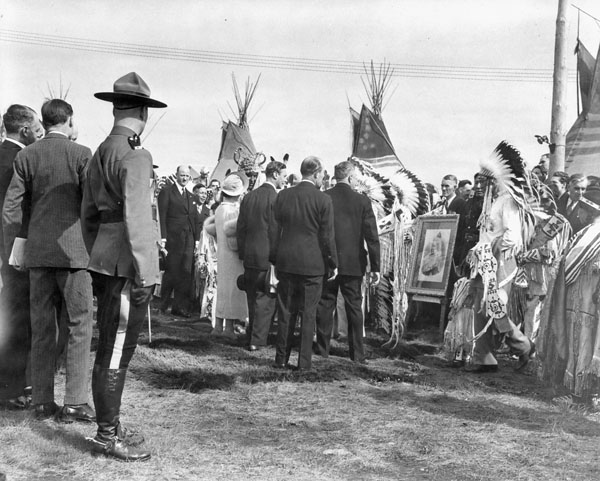
George VI and Elizabeth meet with the chieftains of the Nakoda in Calgary, who brought with them a photo of Queen Victoria

Continuing westward across the Prairies, the Royal Train arrived in Regina on 25 May, followed by Calgary on 26 May and Banff on 27 May. A minor gaffe occurred at Calgary, as described by one of the military officers on parade with the Guard of Honour:

After some conventional compliments on the turnout of the escort, the King had said that he had not expected either such crowds or a ceremonial military welcome. When he had asked Mackenzie King what to expect in Calgary, the Prime Minister has said it was only a small place of little consequence and that there would not be much there. When he saw the guard of honour waiting on the platform, he realized that he should have been in uniform and went back inside the train. But it was, of course, too late to change. (Major) Bradbrooke got the impression that the King was not at all pleased with his Canadian Prime Minister's advice that day.

In Banff, Their Majesties and Mackenzie King posed for press photographs at the Banff Springs Hotel. The King and Queen also attended a private service at St George-in-the-Pines Anglican church.

==== British Columbia ====
The King and the Queen stopped in Vancouver, Victoria, and a number of other smaller communities in British Columbia. Mackenzie King was enthused, stating in his diary on 29 May 1939, "the day in Vancouver was one of the finest on the entire tour," and, the following day: "Without question, Victoria has left the most pleasing of all impressions. It was a crowning gem..."

At one night time stop in the Rocky Mountains, the royal couple sang along with an impromptu a cappella rendition of "When the Moon Comes over the Mountain" that broke out amongst the gathered crowd when the moon emerged from behind the clouds.

=== Return to the east ===
When the royal couple arrived in Edmonton on 2 June, the regular population of 90,000 swelled to more than 200,000, as Albertans from surrounding towns came in to catch sight of the King and Queen, 70,000 people sat in specially constructed grandstands lining Kingsway, which had been renamed to honour the King, to see the royal motorcade.

On 3 June, the King and Queen took a brief walk around Unity, and in Saskatoon, where the royal couple visited the University of Saskatchewan, some 150,000 people turned out to see them, and hundreds of teenage girls dressed in red, white, and blue assembled in the image of a Royal Union Flag and sang "God Save the King". Former Saskatoon Councilor John S. Mills shot footage on 16 mm film. The royal train arrived in the town of Melville at 10 pm on 3 June, attracting over 60,000 people to the town of 3,000. The stop was meant to last only ten minutes, after which the train would stay overnight for servicing. But, with the throngs of people who arrived, the royal party decided to extend the visit to a half-hour, after which the train pulled away, returning a few hours later, once the crowds had dispersed; Canadian Press reporter R. J. Carnegie said of the stop: "Never throughout the tour did I see such unbridled enthusiasm as then."

== State visit to the United States (7–12 June) ==
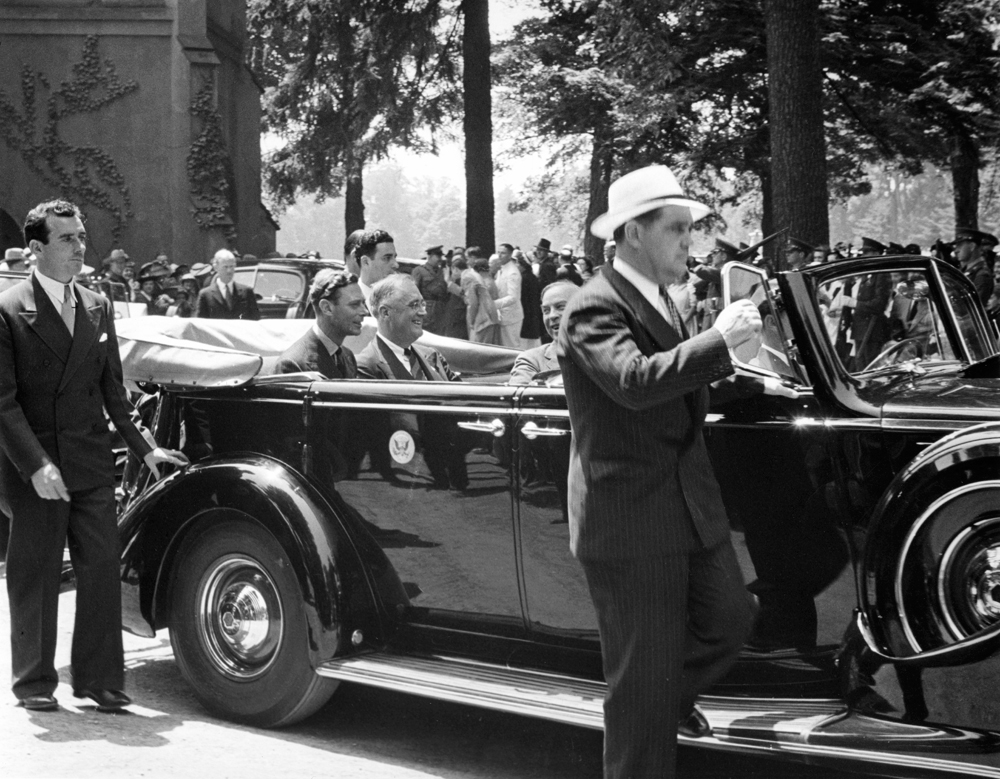
George VI, and Mackenzie King seated in the back of presidential state car with Franklin Roosevelt during the 1939 Canadian state visit to the U.S.

In the United States from 7–12 June, the King and Queen visited Washington, New York City, and Poughkeepsie, New York; they were accompanied by the Canadian prime minister, still Mackenzie King, as the sole minister in attendance to the King, rather than by any British minister, by way of reinforcing that George VI's visit to the United States was a state visit from Canada, despite the point that the King and Queen were presented by Secretary of State Cordell Hull to President Franklin D. Roosevelt as "Their Britannic Majesties." For Mackenzie King, this assertion of Canada's status as a kingdom independent of Britain was a key motive behind the organization of the tour; he wrote in his diary on 17 May 1939: "I... told [the Queen] that I felt somewhat embarrassed about taking in the entire trip with Their Majesties; that it looked like pushing myself to the fore, yet I felt that unless some evidence of Dominion precedence existed, one of the main purposes of the trip would be gone. The Queen then said: 'The King and I felt right along that you should come with us.'"

Another factor, however, was public relations; the presence of the King and Queen, in both Canada and the United States, was calculated to shore up sympathy for Britain in anticipation of hostilities with Nazi Germany. The itinerary included visits to Mount Vernon on 9 June, the 1939 New York World's Fair on 10 June, and dinner at Roosevelt's estate at Hyde Park on 11 June, at which President Roosevelt served hot dogs, smoked turkey, and strawberry shortcake to the royal couple. The 2012 film Hyde Park on Hudson starring Bill Murray contains a lengthy fictionalized depiction of the royal couple's visit to the Roosevelt estate.

== Resumption of the tour (12–15 June) ==
On 12 June the royal couple returned to Canada to continue their royal tour of the country, visiting the Maritime provinces. The King and the Queen stopped in Doaktown, New Brunswick, to take tea in a local tearoom. While they were expected for lunch, they were not expected in the kitchen afterwards, and they took the staff by surprise. (Note: Mrs. Addie Gilks, who ran the tearoom, said of the event: "They talked with us about fishing.... My husband was so taken aback with their appearance that he was unable to retain his presence of mind enough to answer all the questions put to him.")

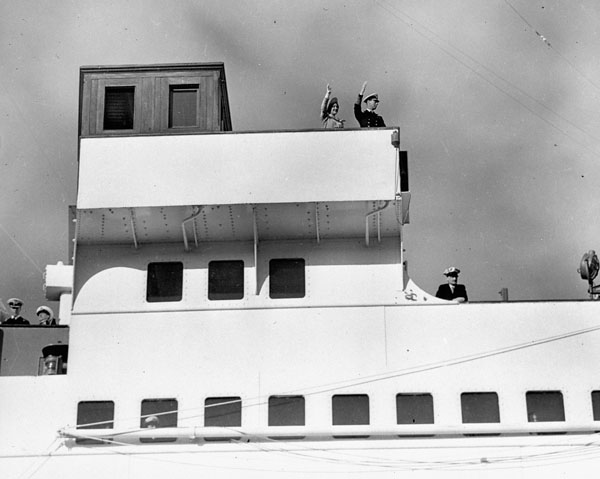
George VI and Elizabeth wave farewell as their ship departs Halifax, Nova Scotia

After a visit to Charlottetown, Prince Edward Island, the royal couple ended their tour at Halifax, Nova Scotia, on 15 June, where a farewell luncheon was held, and the King and Queen each delivered a speech of thanks. That evening, the royal couple boarded the RMS Empress of Britain to tour the then separate Dominion of Newfoundland. of their departure, Mackenzie King wrote in his diary: "The Empress of Britain ran past one end of the harbour where she was towed around, then came back the opposite way to pull out to sea. She was accompanied by British warships and our own destroyers. The Bluenose and other vessels also in the harbour as a sort of escort.... The King and Queen were at the very top of the ship and kept waving.... No farewell could have been finer...."

After visiting St. John's, Newfoundland, George VI and Elizabeth returned to the United Kingdom.

== Legacy ==
Elizabeth told Canadian Prime Minister William Lyon Mackenzie King, "that tour made us", and she returned to Canada frequently both on official tours and privately.

During another tour of Canada in 1985, Queen Elizabeth, by then the Queen Mother, said, "it is now some 46 years since I first came to this country with the King, in those anxious days shortly before the outbreak of the Second World War. I shall always look back upon that visit with feelings of affection and happiness. I think I lost my heart to Canada and Canadians, and my feelings have not changed with the passage of time."

For the visit the Canadian government issued its second commemorative silver dollar, this one showing the standard picture of the king on the obverse and the Canadian Parliament building on the reverse. With a mintage of 1,363,816—large for the time—it remains readily available. At the same time a set of three postage stamps were issued by Canada, two showing members of the Royal Family and one a war memorial. They also are available at low cost.

== See also ==
- List of royal tours of Canada (18th–20th centuries)
