= Gordon Slater (carillonneur) =

Canadian carillonneur (born 1950)

Gordon Frederick Slater (born August 22, 1950) is a Canadian carillonneur (musician who plays tower bells), conductor, bassoonist and organist. A graduate of the Royal Conservatory of Music of the University of Toronto, he is best known for holding the position of Dominion Carillonneur of Canada from 1977 to 2008. He is only the fourth person to have held that post since its inception in 1927, performing daily recitals on the carillon in the Peace Tower of the Parliament Buildings in Ottawa, Ontario, Canada's national capital.

== Career ==
=== Early studies ===
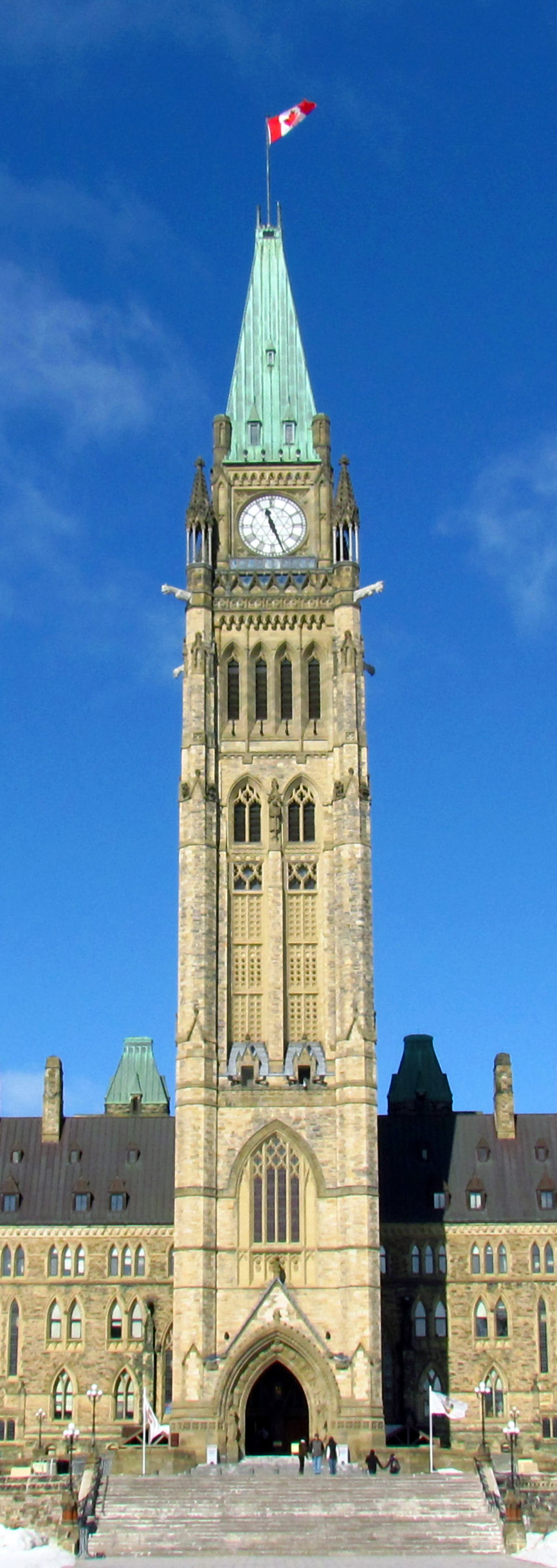
As Dominion Carillonneur of Canada from 1977 to 2008, Slater performed on the carillon in the Peace Tower of the Parliament Buildings in Ottawa.

Born in Toronto, Ontario, Canada, Slater began his musical studies at the age of four, as a piano student of Carmel Archambault at the Royal Conservatory of Music in Toronto. He studied with Archambault until 1964 and went on to study bassoon under Nicholas Kilburn at the University of Toronto from 1968 to 1971. Slater started playing the carillon with his father, James B. Slater, in 1957 while the latter was carillonneur at Toronto's Metropolitan United Church. Gordon Slater also studied carillon with Robert Donnell in Ottawa from 1973 to 1974 and later with Milford Myhre at the carillon of Bok Tower Gardens in Lake Wales, Florida.

=== Performing ===
He held the position of Organist and Choirmaster from 1969 to 1972 at Riverdale Presbyterian Church in Toronto. He worked as Carillonneur at the Soldiers' Tower carillon of the University of Toronto from 1969 to 1977. He was Carillonneur at the Rainbow Tower carillon in Niagara Falls, Ontario from 1972 to 1975. He oversaw the installation of the Exhibition Place Carillon at the Canadian National Exhibition in Toronto, Ontario in 1974 and was Carillonneur there from 1974 to 1976. He released several records in the 1970s, including the 1978 LP record Bells and Brass with the Canadian Brass. Slater was the Dominion Carillonneur of Canada from 1977 to 2008. In this position, he performed on the carillon in the Peace Tower of the Parliament Buildings in Ottawa. Beginning in 1977 he played bassoon and contrabassoon in several Ottawa groups including the Ottawa Symphony Orchestra from 1979 to the present.

=== Other musical activities ===
He worked for Charles Franklin David Legge at the Legge Organ Co., Ltd. in Toronto, Ontario from 1970 to 1977 building, tuning and repairing pipe organs. From 1987 to 2024 he was Music Director of Divertimento Orchestra, an amateur community orchestra based in Ottawa, Ontario. Slater also composes for and teaches the carillon.

== Carillon works ==
=== Compositions ===
- "Carillon Impromptu for Metropolitan’s 200th"
- "Carillon Impromptu on Eventide"
- "Carillon Impromptu on Old Hundredth"
- "Carillon Impromptu on She’s Like the Swallow"
- "Carillon Impromptu on Smokey Mountain Bill"
- "Carillon Impromptu on St. Anne"
- "Carillon Impromptu on The Little Old Sod Shanty"
- "Carillon Impromptu on Un Canadien errant"
- "Carillon Impromptu on When the Ice-Worms Nest Again"
- "Carillon Impromptu on Ye Maidens of Ontario"

=== Arrangements ===
- "In Flanders Fields, arr. for carillon"
- "I’m Called Little Buttercup, arr. for carillon"
- "Poor Wandering One! arr. for carillon"
- "Sorry Her Lot, arr. for carillon"
- "The Major-General’s Song, arr. for carillon"
- "The Pirate King’s Song, arr. for carillon"
- "When I Was a Lad, arr. for carillon"

== Recordings ==
- 1974 The Bells of Niagara, EP record, solo carillon
- 1978 Bells and Brass/Carillon et cuivres, LP record, carillon with the Canadian Brass
- 1979 Peace Tower Christmas/Carillon Noël, LP record, solo carillon
- 1986 Night Music, Cassette tape, solo carillon music composed by Jan Järvlepp
- 1989 Soundtracks of the Imagination, Cassette tape, solo carillon music composed by Jan Järvlepp
- 1994 Soundtracks of the Imagination, Compact disc, solo carillon music composed by Jan Järvlepp
