= Lewiston–Queenston Bridge =

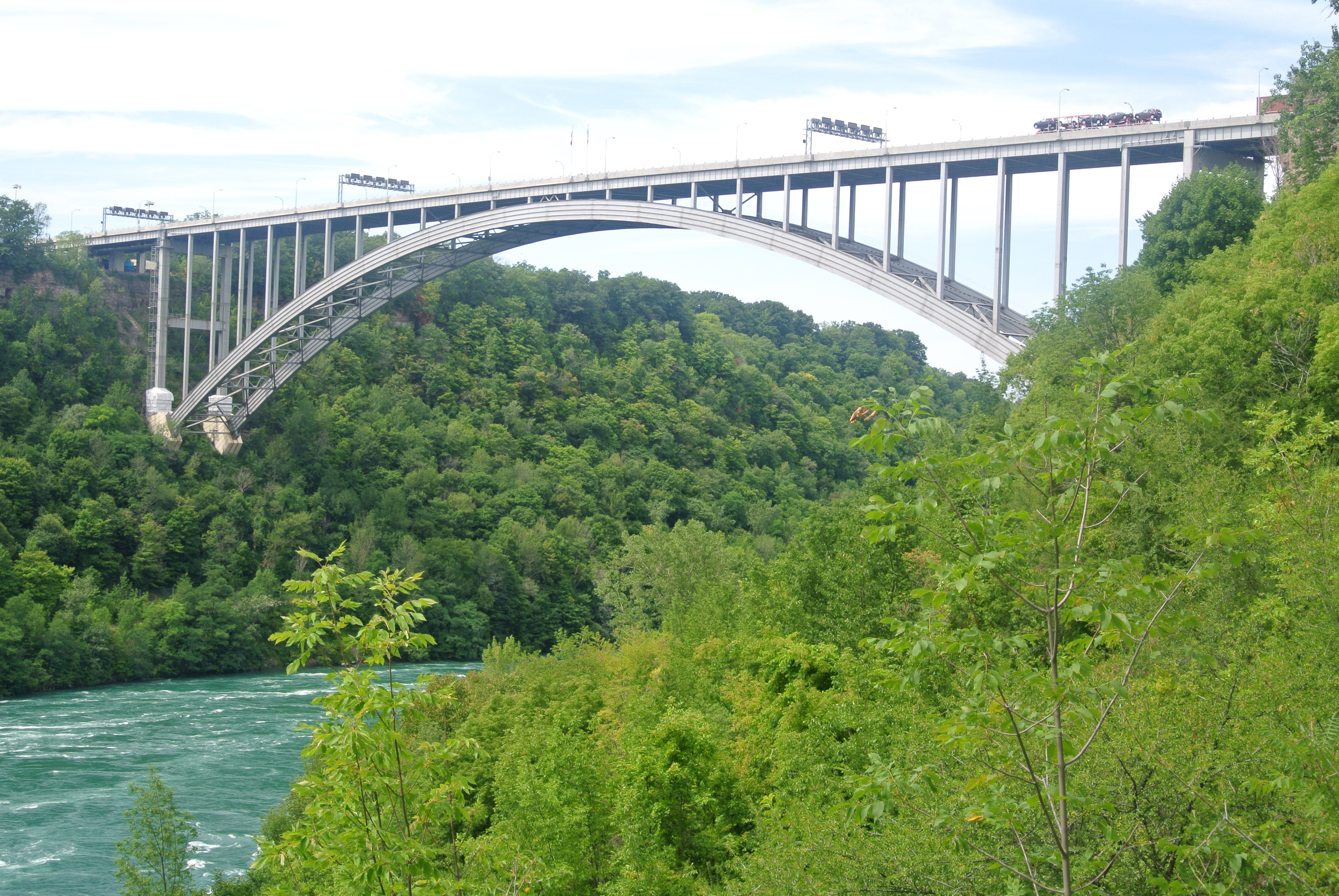
- The bridge as seen from Niagara Gorge.
- Coordinates: 43°9′11″N 79°2′40.03″W
- Carries: 5 reversible lanes of I-190 / Highway 405
- Crosses: Niagara River
- Locale: Queenston, Ontario and Lewiston, New York
- Maintained by: Niagara Falls Bridge Commission

Characteristics
- Design: Arch
- Total length: 1,594 feet (486 m)
- Width: 24 feet (7 m)
- Longest span: 1,000 feet (305 m)
- Clearance below: 370 feet (113 m)

History
- Engineering design by: Hardesty & Hanover
- Fabrication by: Bethlehem Steel
- Construction cost: $16 million
- Opened: November 1, 1962; 63 years ago

Statistics
- Daily traffic: 10,406 AADT
- Toll: Canada-bound only: $6.00 USD or $8.50 CAD per passenger vehicle
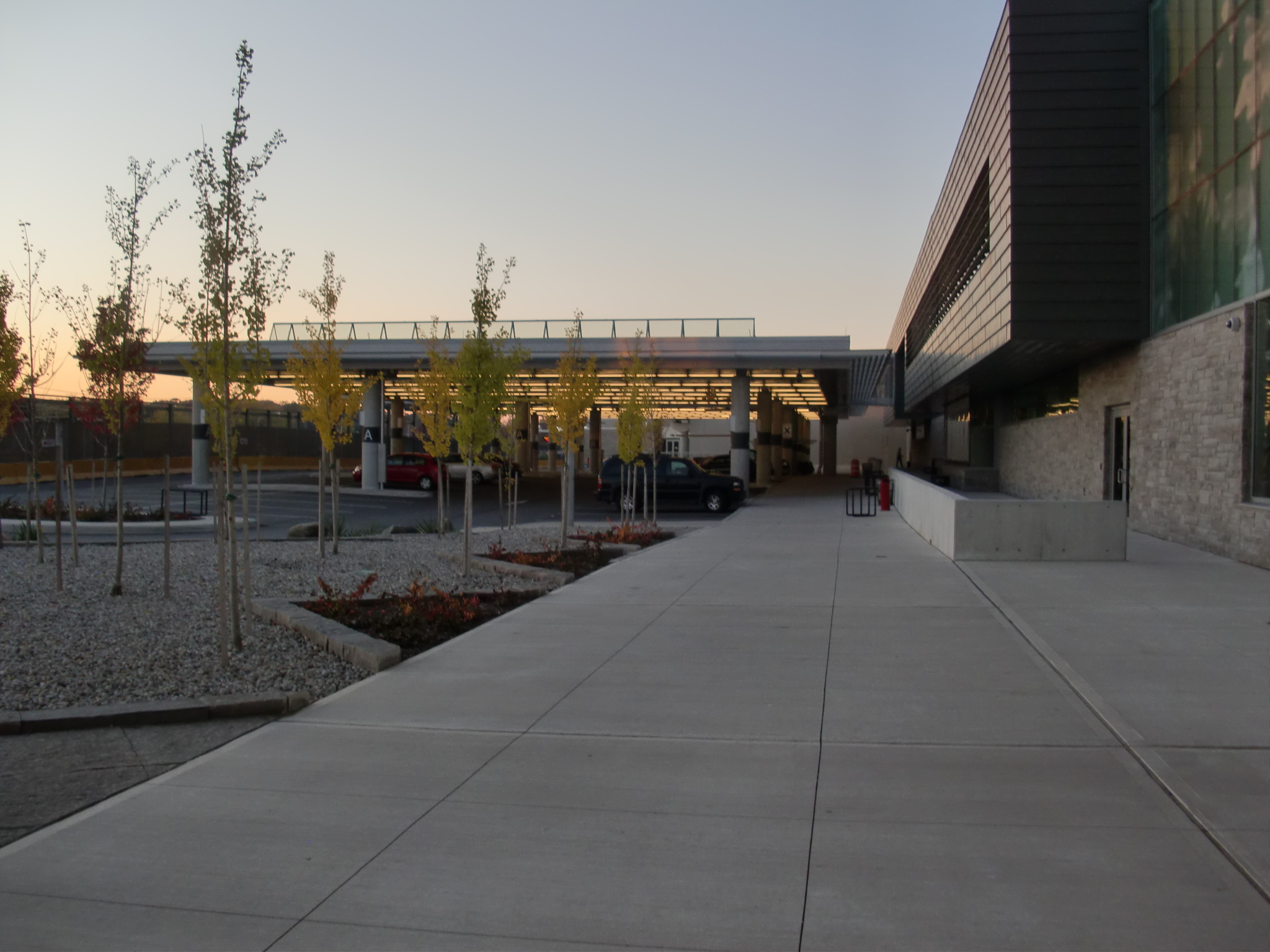
- Canada Border Inspection Station at the Lewiston–Queenston Bridge

Location
- Country: United States; Canada
- Location: US Port: 1 Lewiston-Queenston Bridge, Lewiston, New York 14092; Canadian Port: Hwy 405, Lewiston-Queenston Bridge, Niagara-on-the-Lake, Ontario L0S 1J0

Details
- Opened: 1962

Website
- http://www.cbp.gov/contact/ports/buffalo

Location
- Interactive map of Lewiston–Queenston Bridge

The Lewiston–Queenston Bridge, also known as the Queenston–Lewiston Bridge, is an arch bridge that crosses the Niagara River gorge just south of the Niagara Escarpment. The bridge was officially opened on November 1, 1962. It is an international bridge between the United States and Canada. It connects Interstate 190 in the town of Lewiston, New York to Highway 405 in the community of Queenston, Ontario. The Lewiston–Queenston Bridge is architecturally similar to the Rainbow Bridge at nearby Niagara Falls. At a height of 370 feet (113 m) it is the third highest bridge in the United States east of the Mississippi River.

Customs plazas are located on both ends of the bridge, with tolls only being charged on entering Canada ($6.00 USD or $8.50 CAD per passenger automobile). The bridge accepts E-ZPass electronic toll collection and houses the second Canadian E-ZPass collection facility, after the nearby Peace Bridge. Also, two duty-free stores are located between the two plazas.

The bridge permits no pedestrians, but bicycles and licensed taxi service is permitted. The Lewiston–Queenston Bridge lacks expedited border clearance facilities for NEXUS and FAST card holders traveling from the United States into Canada, but does have a NEXUS lane for travel into the United States.

Gantries have lights indicating the direction of traffic as the lanes are reversible. Speed limit is posted in kilometres and miles per hour (15 mph or 24 km/h limit) along the bridge. Canadian and United States flags fly at the midpoint on the south side of the bridge.

== Border crossing and toll ==
The crossing is the fourth-busiest on the Canada–United States border. It is on the most direct route connecting the US Interstate system to Toronto and Detroit. Canada replaced its border inspection facilities in 2011. The United States announced plans in 2016 to spend US$50 million to upgrade the primary inspection facilities. Construction was completed in 2022. Both facilities are open 24 hours per day, 365 days per year.

The toll for use of the bridge is payable upon entering Canada only.

- Canada-bound:
  - 10 customs booths for cars/RVs
  - 5 customs booths for trucks
  - Dedicated Bus Processing Lane
  - parking area for trucks for inspections
  - helipad
  - 6 toll booths
- US-bound:
  - 6 customs booths for cars/buses/RVs
  - 3 customs booths for trucks
  - parking area for trucks for inspections

Passenger vehicles pay a toll only when entering Canada from the US. The cost is $6.00 USD or $8.50 CAD, as of May 1, 2025, payable by cash in both currencies, debit, Visa, or Mastercard (CAD only) or E-ZPass (USD only).

High mast lighting is used on the Canadian side, with regular light standards used for bridge and the US side.

== Previous suspension bridges ==
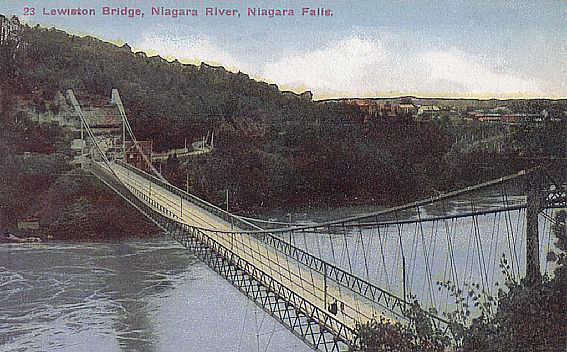
The Queenston-Lewiston suspension bridge, 1915.

The first Queenston-Lewiston Bridge was built in 1851 by engineer Edward Serrell and wrecked by wind in 1864 (or 1854). Newspapers reported that bridge deck had been destroyed in February 1864 by wind which caused main deck to sway excessively due to earlier removal of stabilizing guy-wires by local authorities, however main suspension cables remained fully intact. Some of the cables were still in place as late as 1895. The road deck span was about 841–849 ft (256–259 m). The suspension bridge design was unusual because the cables were attached to the cliff with only small towers. This made the road deck span shorter than the cable span of 1,040 feet (317 m).

A second bridge called the Queenston-Lewiston Bridge, a suspension bridge was later constructed. Located seven-tenths mile (1.1 km) north of the current bridge, this suspension bridge was originally built near the present location of the Rainbow Bridge, and was moved to Queenston in 1898 by R.S. Buck and engineer L.L. Buck, after the completion of the Rainbow Bridge's predecessor, the Upper Steel Arch Bridge. The suspension bridge was dismantled in 1963 after the current bridge was completed and opened.

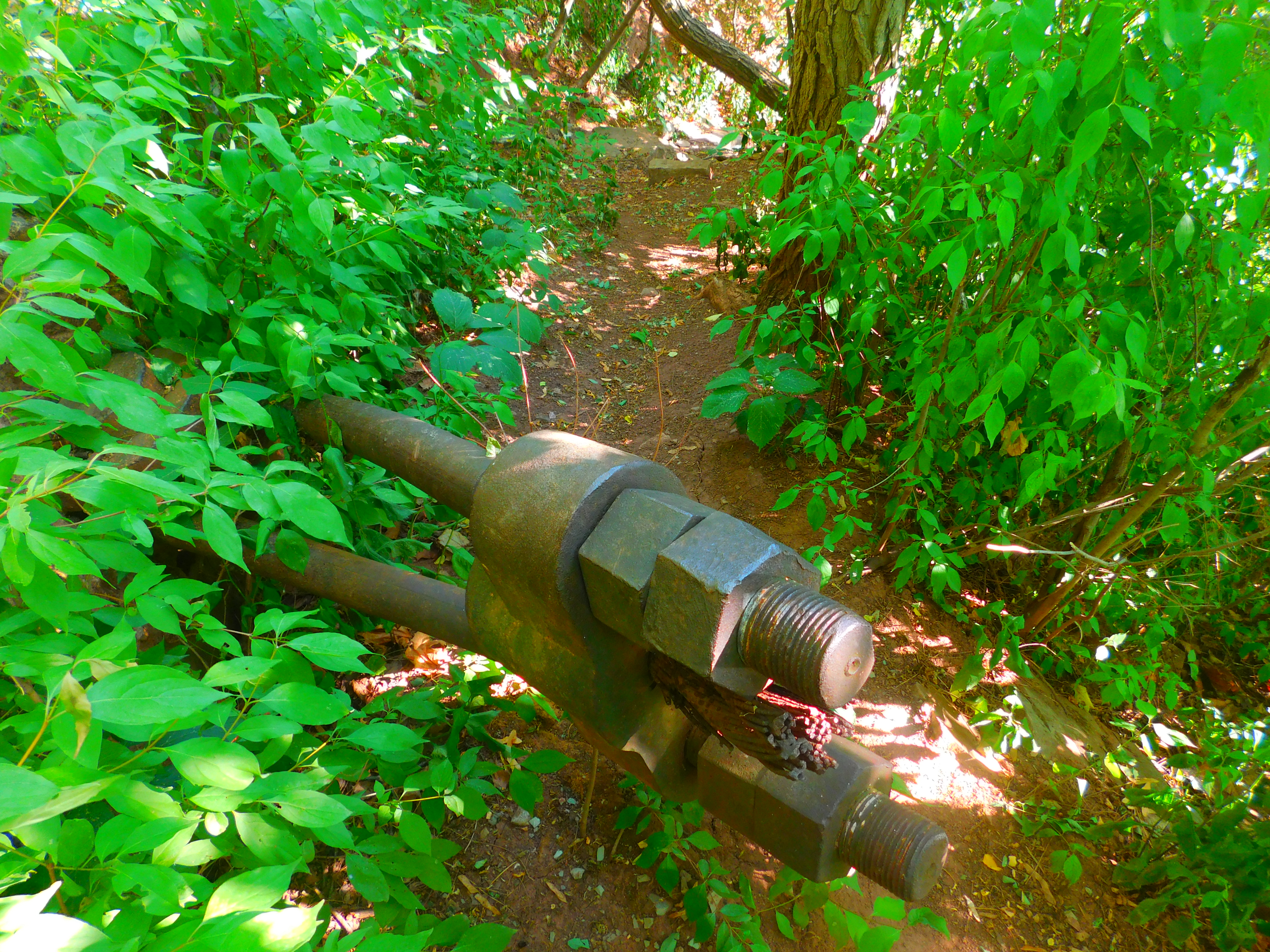
A former suspension cable support in Lewiston for the old suspension bridge in July 2016

Reminders of the earlier bridge are still visible in the area. First is two columns that lie within the Earl W. Brydges Artpark State Park. Second is the original plaque, now located midspan alongside the road, right at the border between the two countries. The plaque is flanked by a US and a Canadian flag.

The supports are part of Owen Morrell's Omega, a steel sculpture and observation platform added in 1981. Two columns remain on the Canadian side at the foot of York Street in a wooded area now known as York Park.

== Plane crash ==
On December 1, 1961, while the bridge was under construction, an F-100 fighter (variously reported as belonging to the United States Air Force or Air National Guard) caught fire just after taking off from a base near Niagara Falls, New York. To protect people in the city, the pilot steered it into the Niagara River gorge before safely ejecting; but this aimed it near the construction site. It passed not far over the heads of workers near the site, missed a construction crane by about 100 feet (30 m), and crashed into the gorge side about 600 feet beyond the bridge before falling into the river.

== See also ==
- List of bridges documented by the Historic American Engineering Record in New York
- List of bridges in Canada
- List of bridges in the United States by height
- List of Canada–United States border crossings
- List of crossings of the Niagara River
- List of international bridges in North America
