= Queen Elizabeth Way Monument =

Canadian monument

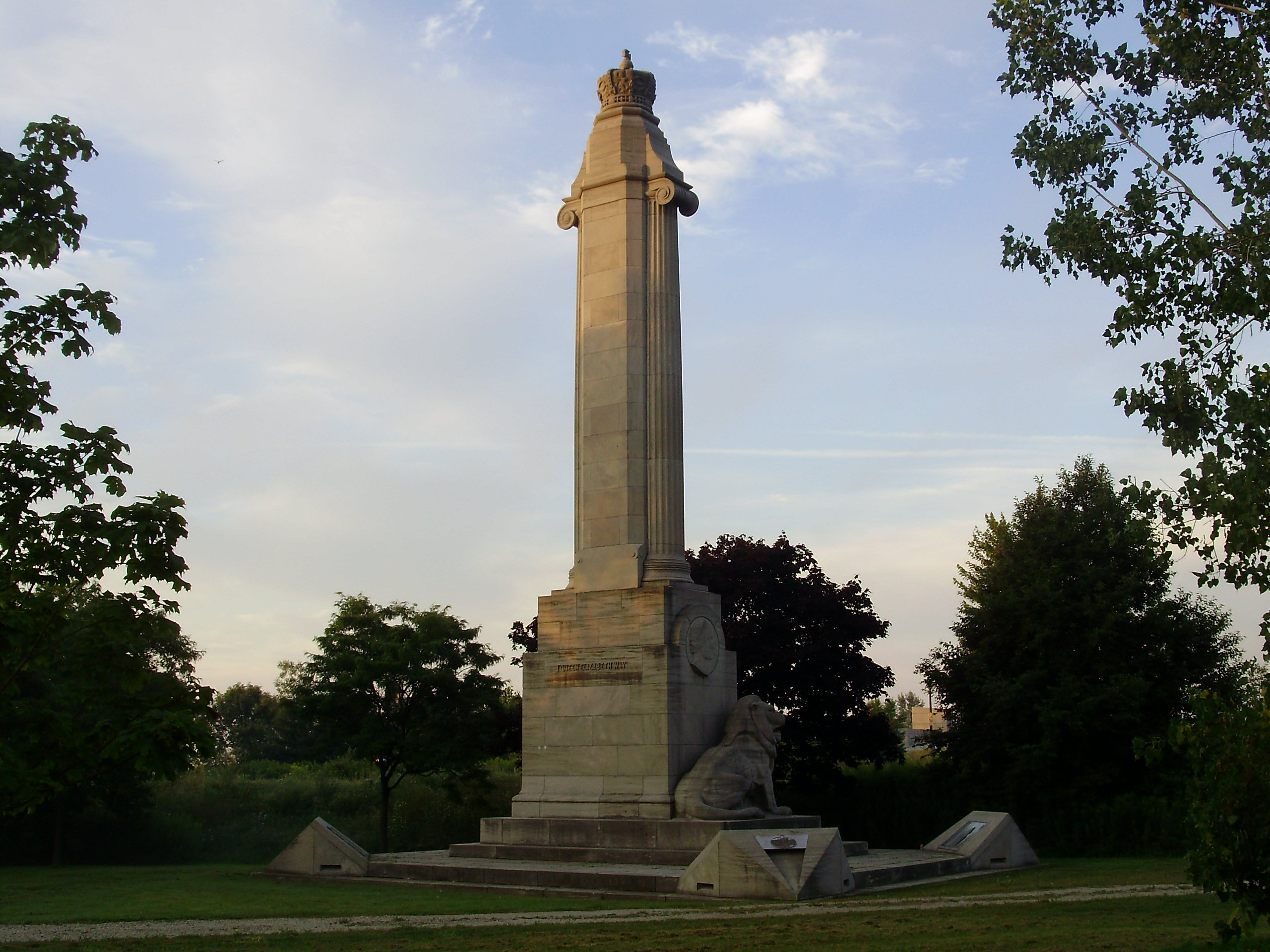
- Interactive map of Queen Elizabeth Way Monument
- Location: Sir Casimir Gzowski Park, Toronto, Ontario, Canada
- Coordinates: 43.633167°N 79.470409°W
- Designer: Frances Loring, William Lyon Somerville, Florence Wyle
- Material: Limestone
- Height: 12 metres (40 ft)
- Completion date: 1940
- Dedicated date: June 1939
- Dedicated to: Queen Elizabeth the Queen Mother

The Queen Elizabeth Way Monument, also known as the Lion Monument and as the Loring Lion, is an Art Deco monument located in Toronto, Ontario, Canada. The 1939–1940 monument honouring Queen Elizabeth was built as a decorative marker monument for the Toronto entrance to the Queen Elizabeth Way (QEW) highway.

== Description ==
The stone monument consists of a column with a crown at the top on top of a base. On the face of the base section is a bas-relief with profiles of the Queen Consort and King George VI, and a stone lion is placed in front of the base. The monument was designed by architect William Lyon Somerville, who also designed the Henley Bridge of the QEW. Sculptor Frances Loring was commissioned to execute the stone lion. Florence Wyle modelled the royal profiles and crown. Loring started the lion after the entry of Britain and Canada into World War II and it inspired her design: "a snarling, defiant British Lion, eight feet high." Loring personally carved the lion herself from Queenston limestone. She fired her originally commissioned carver after he made unauthorized changes and took over the carving herself in the late summer and fall of 1940. The monument cost CA$23,000 ($472,075 in 2025 dollars)

== History ==
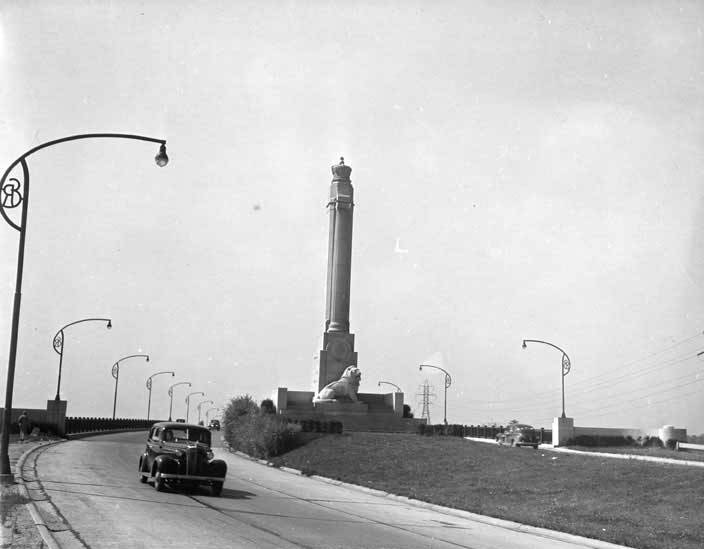
The monument at the entrance of the Queen Elizabeth Way, c. 1940. The monument was relocated to Sir Casimir Gzowski Park in 1972 to accommodate the roadway's expansion.

The monument was dedicated June 7, 1939, by King George VI and Queen Elizabeth, the namesake of the highway, during the 1939 royal tour of Canada.

In 1972, the Government of Ontario announced a new expansion to eight lanes of the QEW at the Humber River, necessitating the removal of the monument. It was first proposed to be moved to Ontario Place but the proposed location spawned public criticism. Instead, the monument was moved in August 1975 to nearby Sir Casimir Gzowski Park along Lake Ontario, on the east side of the Humber River. It was re-dedicated in 1989 by Queen Elizabeth, by then styled and known as The Queen Mother.

The Queen Elizabeth Way was Ontario's first "super-highway" and it was adorned with decoration, such as its light standards and the Henley Bridge in St. Catharines, Ontario. The bridge is adorned with monuments at each end of the bridge in the area between the two directions of traffic. Each is a galley prow with four regal lions in the boat, each bearing a unique shield. There are also piers at each end, two decorated with sailing ships, a third of a native person and canoe and a fourth of a rower. These were designed by the same team that designed the Lion Monument. These remain in their original location.

== See also ==
- Monarchy in Ontario
- Royal monuments in Canada
