= Rainbow Bridge (Niagara Falls) =

Major crossing of the Niagara River

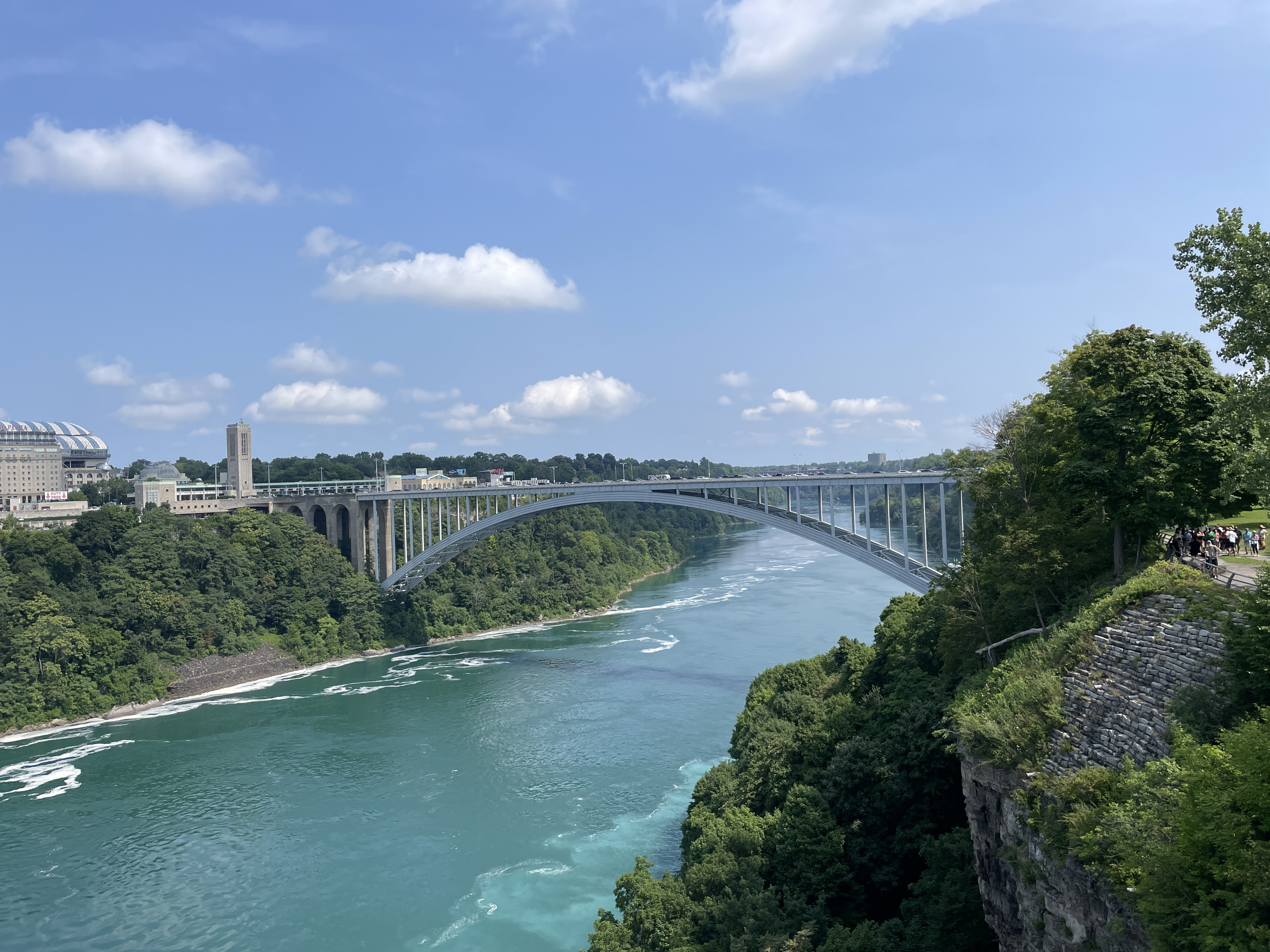
- Rainbow Bridge, viewed from Niagara Falls Observation Tower
- Coordinates: 43°05′25″N 79°04′04″W
- Carries: 4 lanes of NY 955A / Regional Road 420, pedestrian traffic
- Crosses: Niagara River
- Locale: Niagara Falls, Ontario, Canada and Niagara Falls, New York, U.S.
- Official name: Niagara Falls International Rainbow Bridge
- Maintained by: Niagara Falls Bridge Commission

Characteristics
- Design: Arch bridge of steel construction
- Total length: 1,450 ft (440 m)
- Height: 202 ft (62 m)
- Longest span: 960 ft (290 m)

History
- Construction cost: $4 million
- Opened: November 1, 1941; 85 years ago

Statistics
- Toll: $6.00 USD or $8.50 CAD per automobile $1.00 USD or CAD per bicyclist $1.25 CAD per pedestrian, US bound

Location
- Interactive map of Rainbow Bridge

The Niagara Falls International Rainbow Bridge, commonly known as the Rainbow Bridge, is a steel arch bridge across the Niagara River, connecting the cities of Niagara Falls, New York, United States, and Niagara Falls, Ontario, Canada.

== Construction ==
The Rainbow Bridge was built near the site of the earlier Honeymoon Bridge, which collapsed in 1938 due to an ice jam in the Niagara Gorge.

Architect Richard (Su Min) Lee designed the bridge; a design also used for the Lewiston-Queenston Bridge, approximately 10 kilometres (6 mi) downriver. The bridge's Rainbow Tower and Canadian side plaza are the work of another Canadian architect, William Lyon Somerville. King George VI and Queen Elizabeth, during their visit to Niagara Falls as part of their 1939 royal tour of Canada, dedicated the future construction site of the Rainbow Bridge; a monument was later erected to commemorate the occasion. Construction began in May 1940. The bridge officially opened on November 1, 1941.

The Niagara Falls Bridge Commission chose the name "Rainbow Bridge" in March 1939, because rainbows occur frequently near the falls due to water spray and mist in the air.

== Description and specifications ==
The New York State Department of Transportation designates the bridge as NY 955A, an unsigned reference route. Roads that adjoin the bridge include New York routes 104 and 384, and the Niagara Scenic Parkway. The Ontario Ministry of Transportation designates the bridge as part of Highway 420. The Rainbow Tower, part of the plaza complex on the Canadian side, houses a carillon, which plays several times daily.

The Rainbow Bridge does not permit commercial trucks; the nearest border crossing accessible to trucks is the Lewiston-Queenston Bridge.

For a bicyclist, the toll to cross the bridge is US$1.00 or $1.00 CAD. Pedestrians are only charged if they are departing from Canada either US$1.00 or $1.25 CAD. As of May 2025, the cash toll for personal vehicles is $8.50 CAD. In 2025, cross-border traffic declined significantly after the trade war began, with 23% fewer Canadians returning home in February of that year.

== 2023 car crash ==
On November 22, 2023, a 2022 Bentley Flying Spur traveling at high speed left the roadway, went airborne, crashed and exploded at the Rainbow Bridge border crossing on the American side. The vehicle's two occupants died, and a U.S. Customs and Border Protection officer was injured. The crash and subsequent explosion was at first investigated as a potential terrorist attack, but was later determined to have been an unintentional crash.

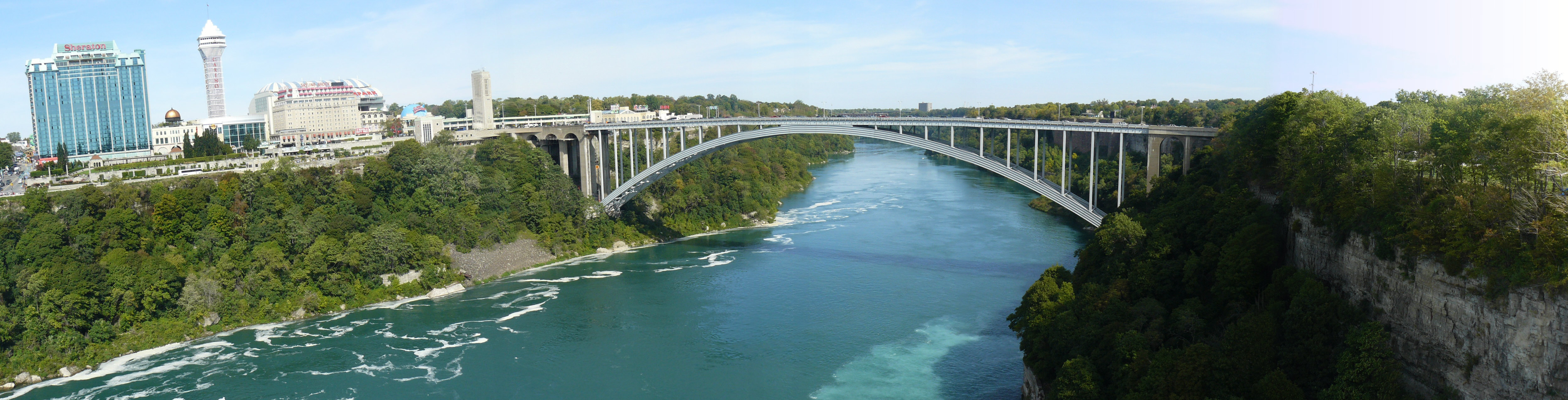
Rainbow Bridge (Canada on left)

== Gallery ==
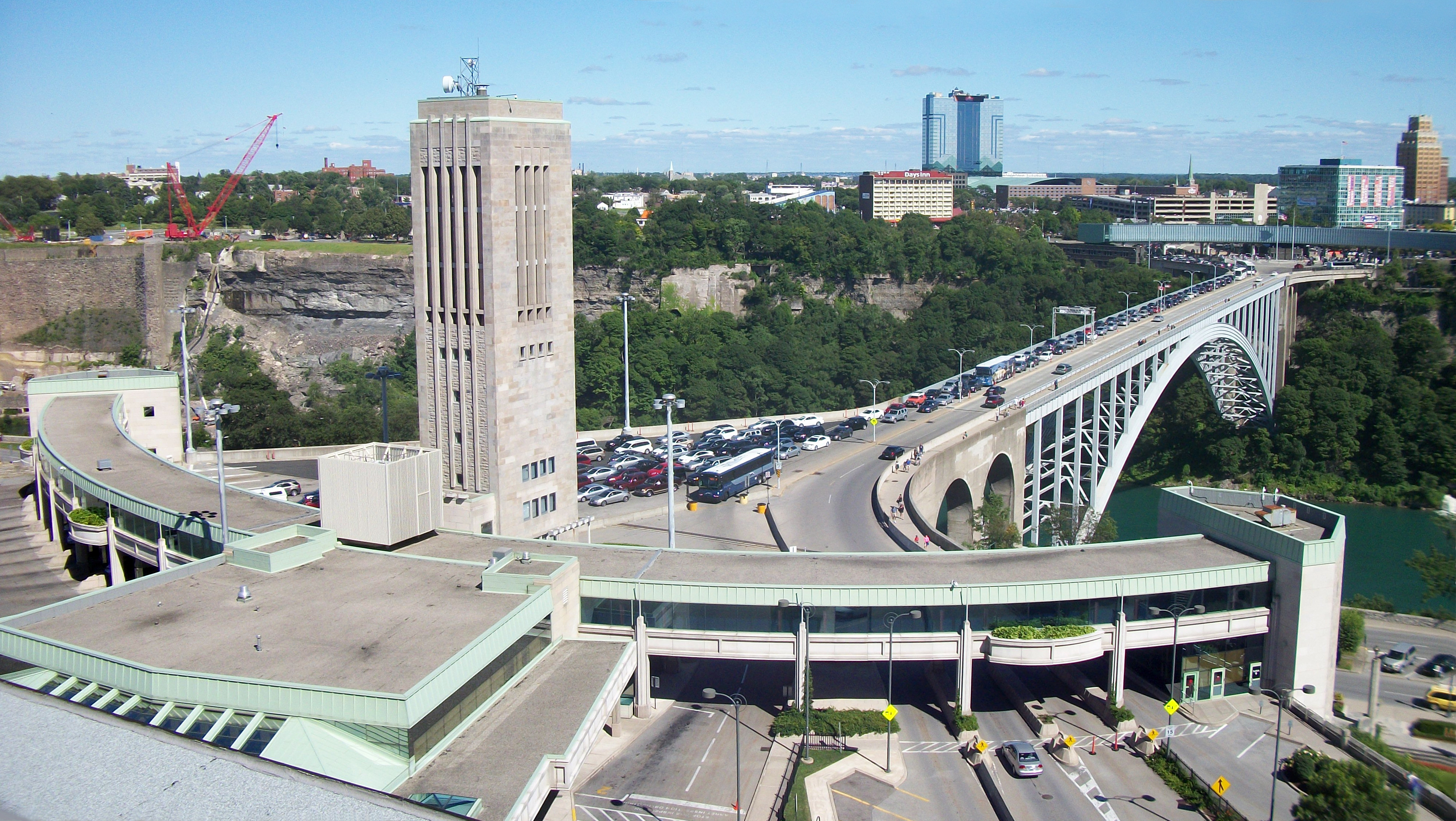
Rainbow Bridge, viewed from Ontario

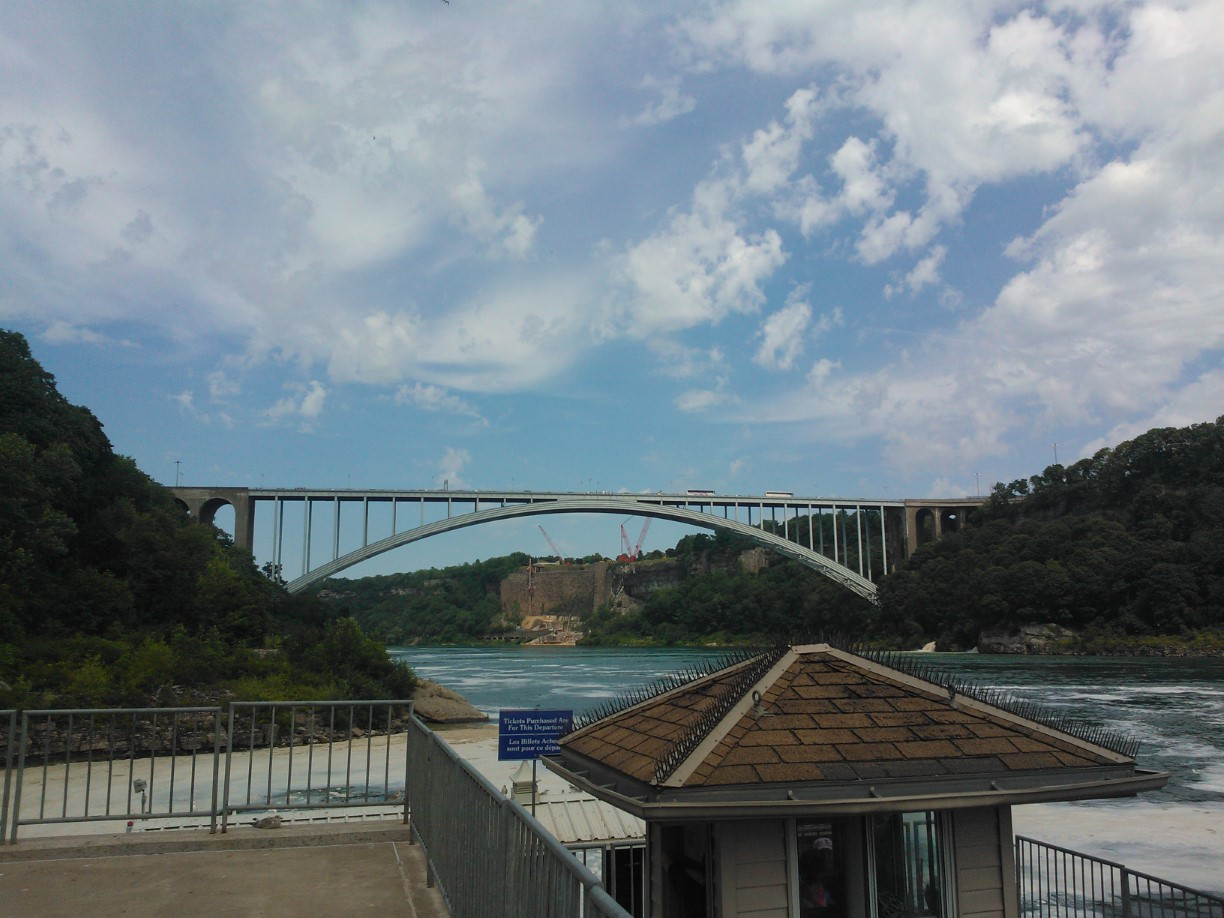
The bridge as viewed from Canada, with collapsed Schoellkopf Power Station visible in the distance

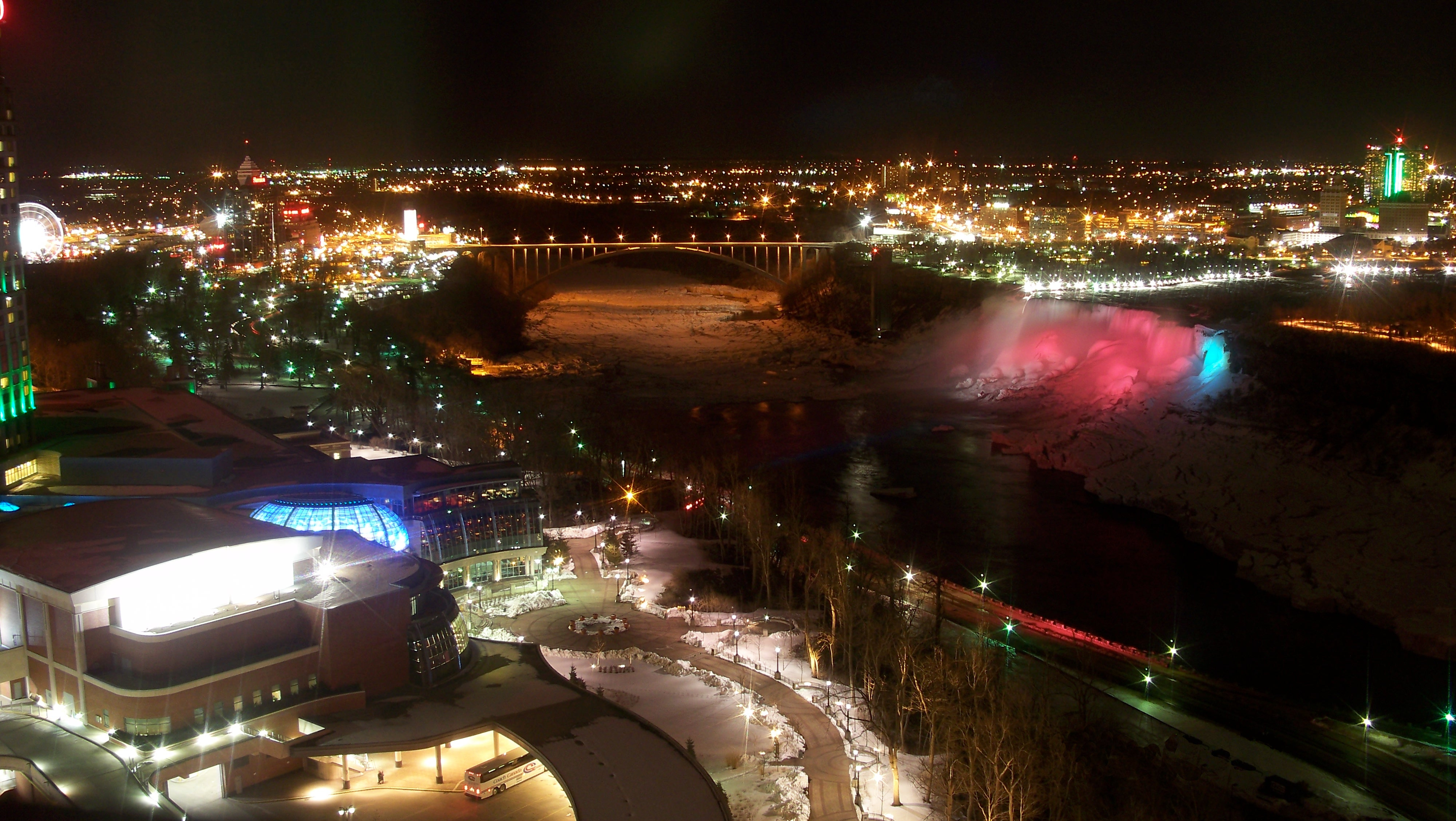
Bridge and the American Falls at night

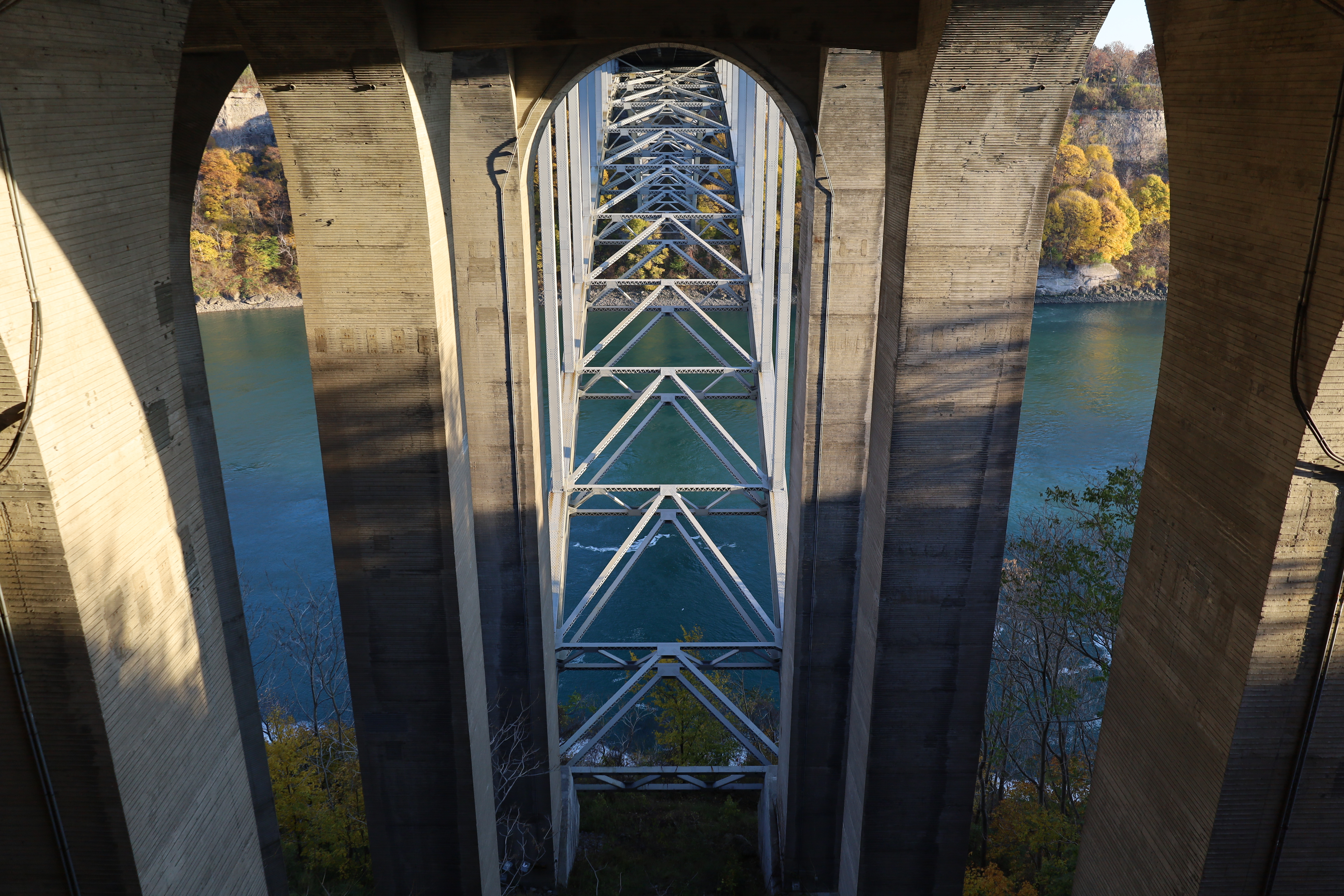
Underside of the bridge

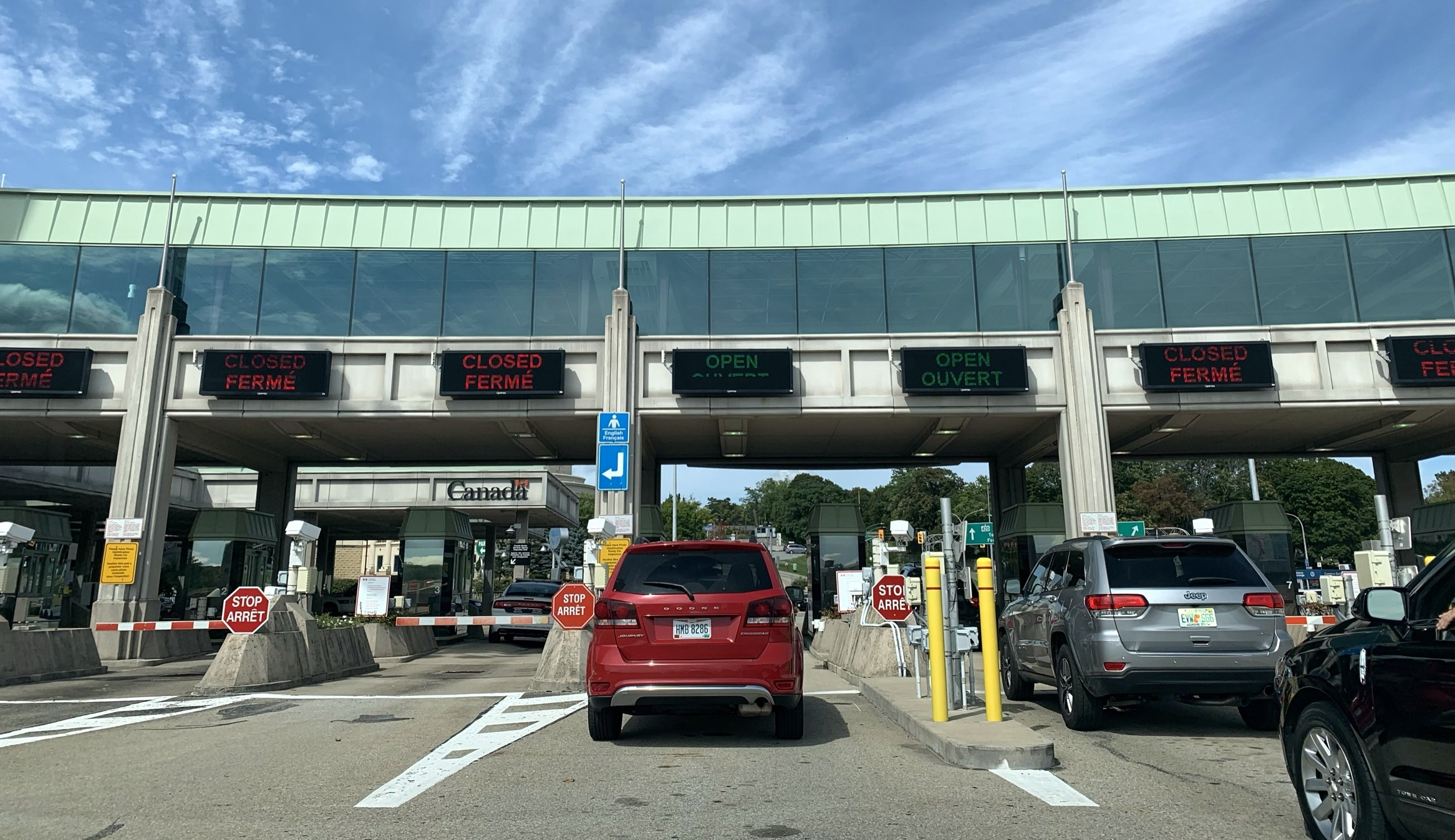
The border station to enter Canada after crossing the bridge from the US

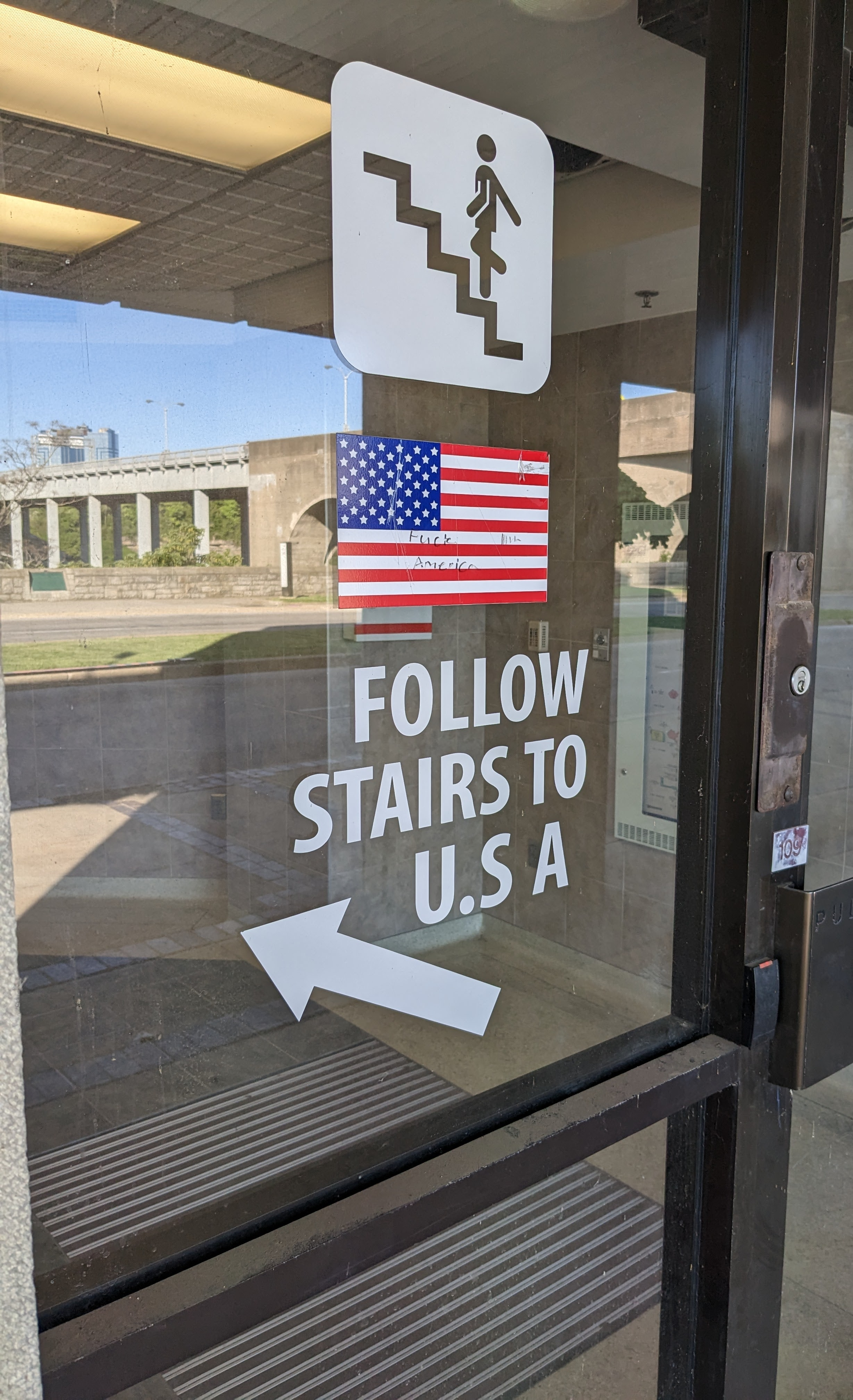
Directions to the US for internationally destined pedestrians

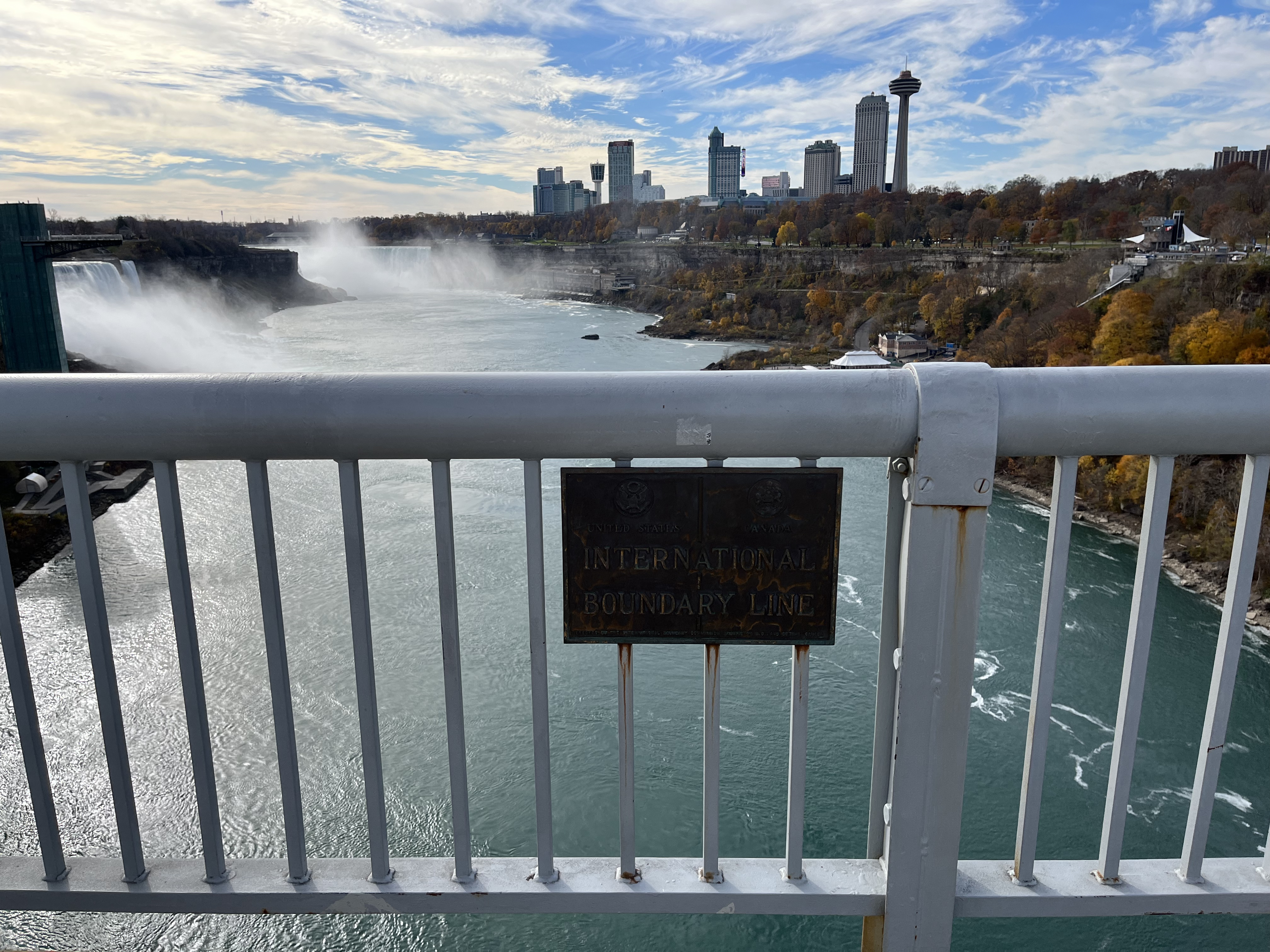
International border marker on the bridge

== See also ==
- List of bridges documented by the Historic American Engineering Record in New York
- List of bridges in Canada
- List of bridges in the United States by height
- List of international bridges in North America
- List of crossings of the Niagara River
- List of reference routes in New York
