= William Lyon Somerville =

Canadian architect

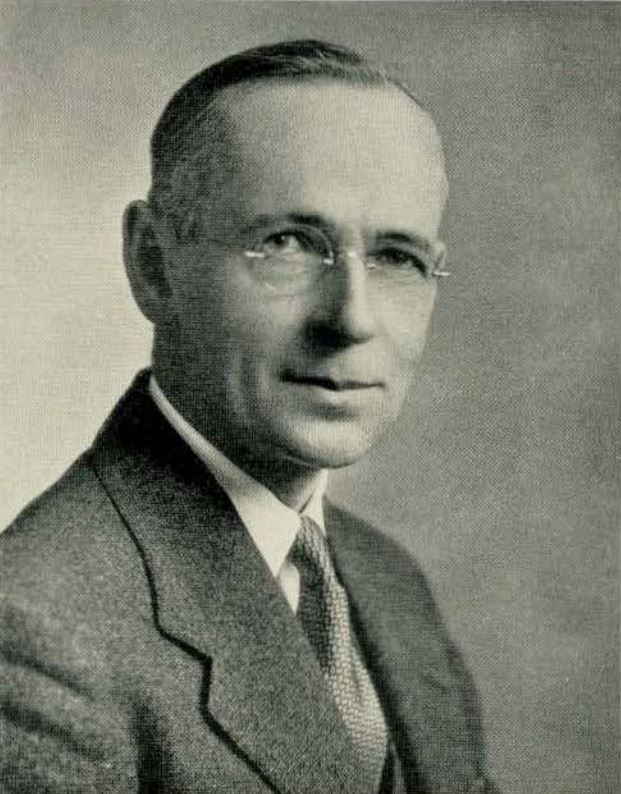
- Portrait of W. L. Somerville, 1936 for RAIC Journal
- Born: August 5, 1886; Hamilton, Ontario, Canada
- Died: April 14, 1965 (aged 78); Toronto, Ontario, Canada
- Occupation: Architect
- Spouse: Evelyn Mary Gillard
- Buildings: Cawthra-Elliot Estate; Henley Bridge; McMaster University original buildings; Mills Memorial Library, now the McMaster Museum of Art; Rainbow Tower

William Lyon Somerville (August 5, 1886 – April 14, 1965) was a Canadian architect practicing in Toronto, Ontario and Southern Ontario, Canada. He was president of the Ontario Association of Architects, and president of the Royal Architectural Institute of Canada. He was an accomplished architect who designed hospitals, commercial and institutional buildings, residential buildings. Somerville designed the original McMaster University buildings in Hamilton, Ontario, and the Rainbow Tower complex in Niagara Falls. He also designed several monuments, including the Clifton Gate Pioneer Memorial Arch in Niagara Falls and the Henley Bridge and Queen Elizabeth Way Monument for the new Queen Elizabeth Way superhighway built in the late 1930s and early 1940s.

Somerville was born on August 5, 1886, in Hamilton, Ontario. He was educated in Hamilton and New York, New York. He first practiced architecture in the United States before World War I. He returned to Ontario to practice in 1919.

When McMaster University moved to Hamilton, Ontario, Somerville was contracted by the firm of J. Francis Brown & Son to design the University's plan and several of its buildings. Somerville designed the Convocation Hall, University Hall, Hamilton Hall, Wallingford Hall, and the Refectory in the Collegiate Gothic style. Somerville would later design the Mills Memorial Library, however by then the Collegiate Gothic style was considered passé and it was designed in a contemporary style. The building now houses the McMaster Museum of Art.

Somerville was a favoured architect of T. B. McQuesten, Ontario's Minister of Highways and Public Works in the mid-1930s. McQuesten was the figure in the Ontario Government responsible for many public works that Somerville was involved in. These included restoration of old forts for their touristic value. Somerville assisted in the restoration of several historic forts in Ontario: Fort Henry in Kingston, Fort George at Niagara-On-The-Lake and Fort Erie. For McQuesten, Somerville worked on the design of the Queen Elizabeth Way, which was built to facilitate the travel of American tourists into Ontario, including the Henley Bridge and the Lion Monument.

Several examples of Somerville's work took place in Niagara Falls. The Honeymoon Bridge had been considered for replacement in the 1930s. Its destruction by ice necessitated the construction of a new bridge into Niagara Falls for Americans. Somerville was part of the design team for the new Rainbow Bridge and designed the Rainbow Tower, the bridge's Canadian Plaza and a bus terminal, all designed by Somerville. Somerville also designed the Clifton Gate Pioneer Memorial Arch, a Depression-era make-work project in Niagara Falls, a monumental arch to impress American visitors to the Canadian side of Niagara Falls. The arch was demolished in 1967, but portions of it were saved and are on display in Toronto. Another example of Somerville's work in Niagara Falls is the Oakes Garden Theatre, for which he collaborated with Canadian sculptors Florence Wyle, Frances Loring and Elizabeth Wyn Wood. Somerville preferred to collaborate with Canadian artists and was a member of the "Diet Kitchen Group", an informal group that were interested in fostering the connections between the decorative arts and architecture. In 1927, Somerville made a speech urging the close collaboration of fine artists and architects. "Architecture is the mother of the arts and it is her main object to make known art." In the same speech, Somerville supported more recognition of Canadian artists.

The Somerville-designed Cawthra-Elliott residence in Mississauga, Ontario, is notable and designated a historic place. Somerville designed it in a Georgian Revivalist style, according to his philosophy that "a perfect Canadian home must descend directly from the cottages of England." Somerville was also involved in national housing issues. During the 1930s, Somerville participated in efforts to simplify housing design so as to build more low-cost housing. During World War II, Somerville was involved in the effort to provide housing around munitions and other war production efforts.

Somerville's work in hospitals includes the Ontario Hospital in St Thomas, Ontario, St Joseph's Hospital in Brantford, Ontario and Pembroke General Hospital in Pembroke, Ontario as well as consulting on University Hospital in Edmonton, Alberta, and additions to St Michael's Hospital in Toronto, Ontario, the Red Cross Crippled Children's Hospital in Calgary, Alberta and St Joseph's Hospital in Hamilton.

Somerville's titles included Royal Canadian Academy of Arts 'Academician', a Fellow of the Royal Institute of British Architecture, a Fellow and president of the Royal Architectural Institute of Canada (1936–1938) and President of the Ontario Association of Architects (1927–1928). Somerville was also a prolific writer for Canadian Homes and Gardens magazine, in which he discussed Canadian home design. The University of Calgary honours Somerville with the "William Lyon Somerville Visiting Lectureship" in its Architecture program. In 1959, McMaster gave him an honorary doctorate of laws.

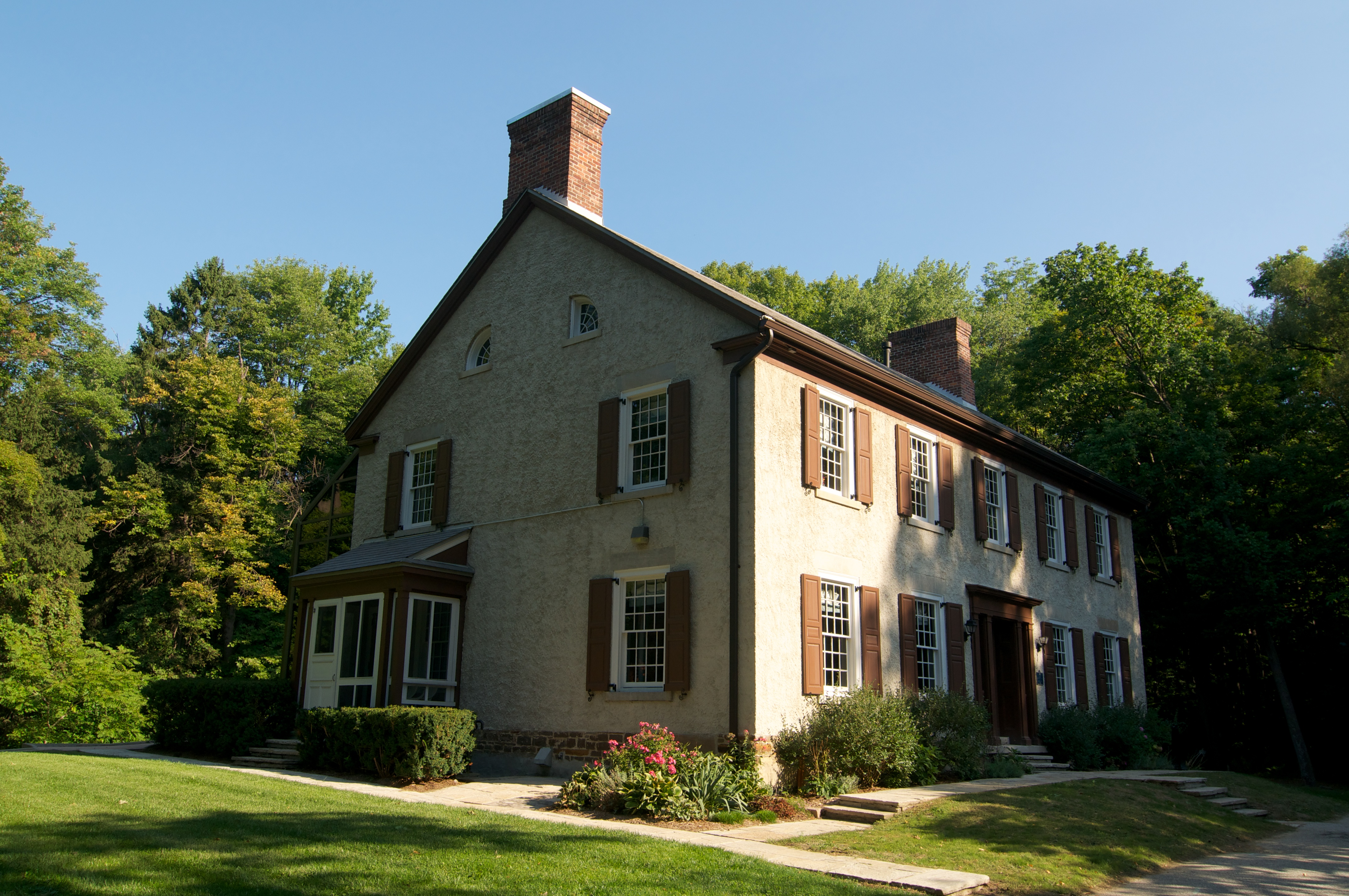
Cawtha Estate residence

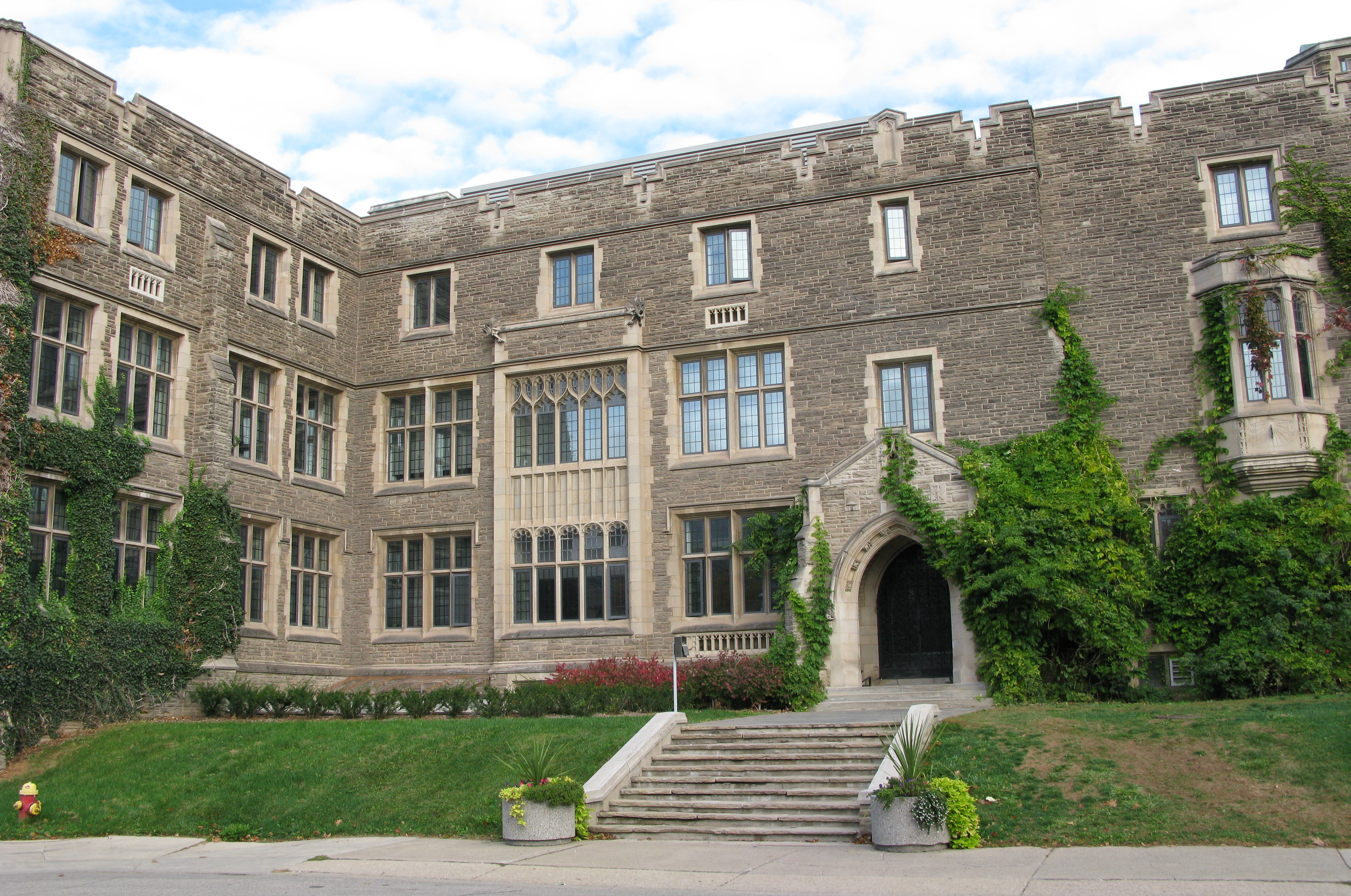
Hamilton Hall at McMaster

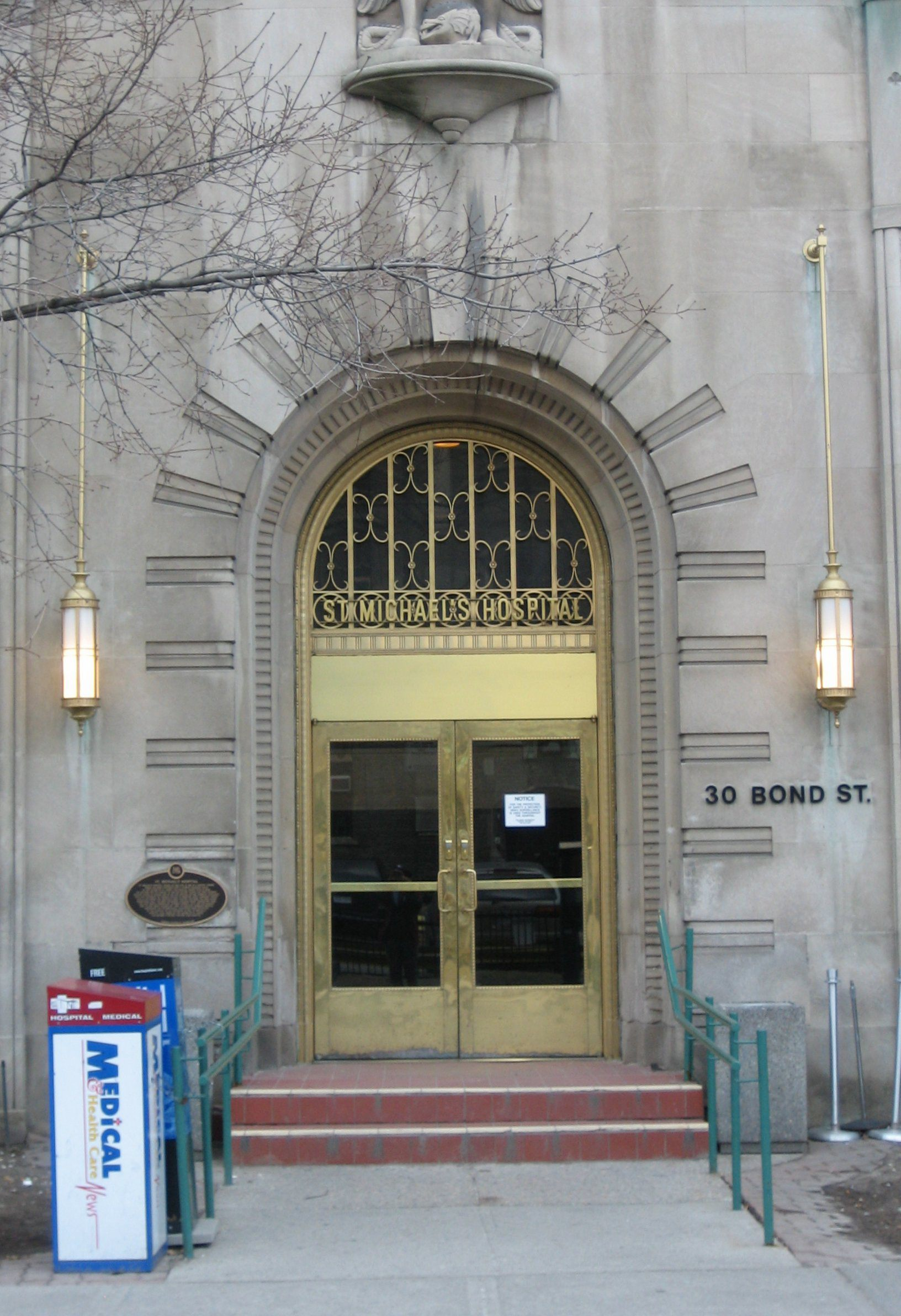
30 Bond Street entrance of St. Michael's Hospital

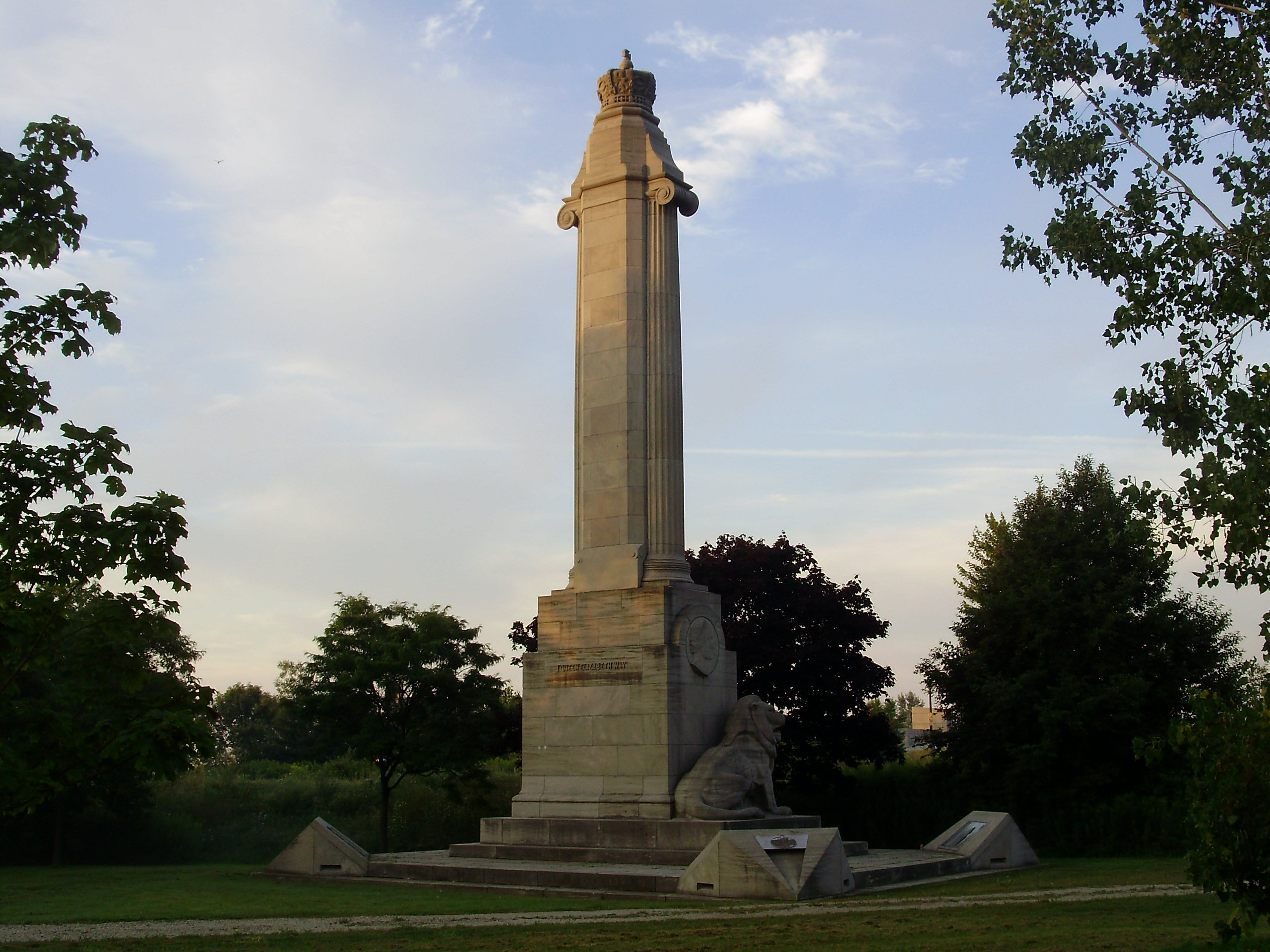
Lion Monument for QEW

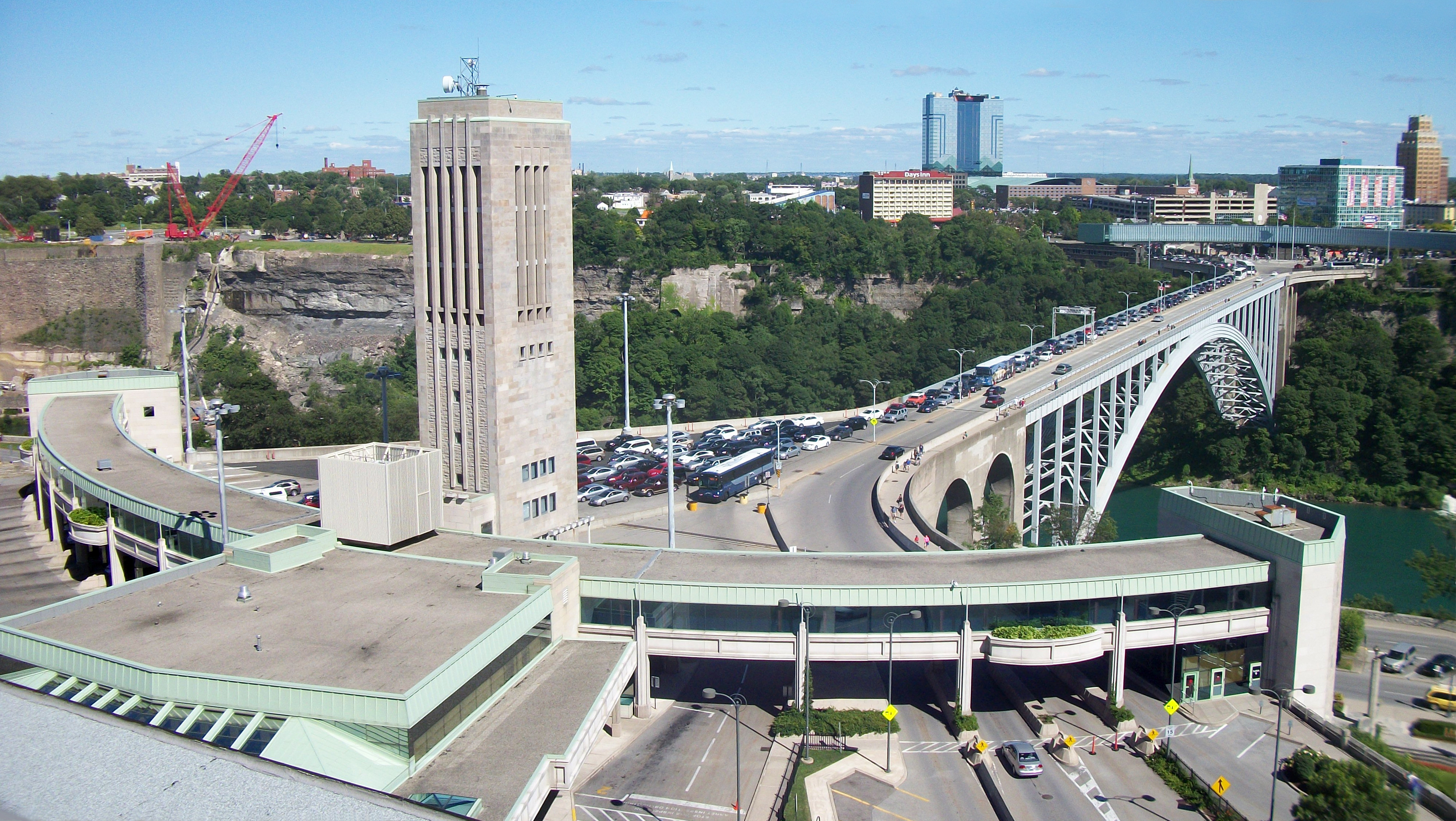
Rainbow Bridge bell tower and plaza in foreground
