= Henley Bridge (Ontario) =

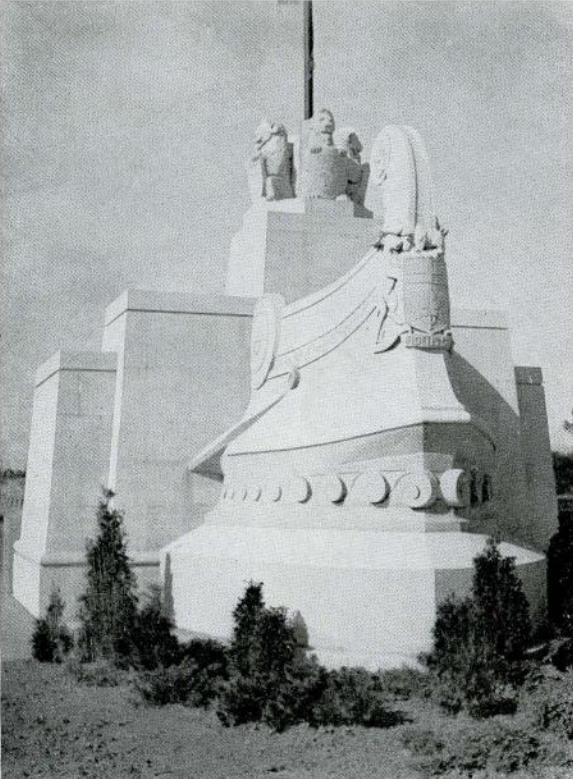
- View of Henley Bridge Decorative Abutment, April 1941
- Coordinates: 43°10′42.8″N 79°16′20.7″W
- Carries: Queen Elizabeth Way
- Crosses: Twelve Mile Creek
- Named for: Royal Canadian Henley Rowing Course

Characteristics
- Total length: 715 feet (218 m)
- No. of lanes: 8

History
- Architect: W. L. Somerville
- Engineering design by: Bridge Office of the Department of Highways of Ontario
- Construction start: 1939
- Construction end: 1940
- Opened: August 23, 1940

The Henley Bridge is a multi-span open spandrel concrete arch bridge in St. Catharines, Ontario, Canada. The bridge carries eight lanes of traffic of the Queen Elizabeth Way (QEW) in an east–west direction over Twelve Mile Creek. The bridge was built during the late 1930s and formally opened on August 23, 1940.

The structure was designed by the Bridge office of the Department of Highways of Ontario under Chief Bridge Engineer Arthur Sedgewick. The monuments at each end were designed by Toronto architect William Lyon Somerville, who also designed the Queen Elizabeth Way Monument at the then-eastern terminus of the QEW west of the Humber River. Somerville incorporated decorations by sculptors Frances Loring and Florence Wyle. Within the median, each entrance to the Henley Bridge incorporates the prow of a galley, variously described as being Viking or Egyptian in design, carved in Queenston limestone, with oars and warrior shield in addition to the crest of the British Royal family. Above both prows of the ship are four lions. Each lion has a shield of the other eight Canadian provinces (as Newfoundland was a separate British colony until 1949); the galley was adorned with the coats of arms of each provinces. The bridge is supported by four arches as it passes over the creek valley. There are two stone piers at each end of the bridge: the western piers have reliefs of sailing ships, while the eastern piers have a relief of a native person and a canoe on one side, as well as a Henley rower on the other. The bridge passes to the south of the section of Twelve Mile Creek designated the Royal Canadian Henley Rowing Course, which gives the bridge its name. The central railings were originally more decorative and connected the two prows.

Near the bridge is the site of the original dedication of the QEW. King George VI and Queen Elizabeth, on a visit to Canada, visited St. Catharines on June 7, 1939. Their car reached the intersection of Niagara Street where it crossed the QEW construction site. At that point their car broke a beam of light, unveiling signs saying "Queen Elizabeth Way," to officially dedicate the highway. A plaque on the nearby Martindale Road bridge is inscribed with the dedication that the Royal couple "opened" the Henley bridge on June 7, 1939, although the bridge was not yet complete. A crowd of 2,000 attended the official opening of the Henley Bridge on August 23, 1940.

As originally designed, the bridge carried two lanes of traffic in each direction. The bridge has since been expanded several times. In 1989-90, new concrete arches were made in an expansion to six lanes. The highway was expanded again in 2007 and now carries a total of four lanes in each direction. The original monument and pier decorations remain, but the rest of the bridge has been extensively rebuilt.
