= Niagara Falls Bridge Commission =

- Company type: Public benefit corporation/extra-provincial corporation (Ontario)
- Founded: 1938
- Headquarters: 5365 Military Rd, Lewiston, New York, United States
- Website: niagarafallsbridges.com

The Niagara Falls Bridge Commission is an international public agency which administers three international bridges across the Niagara River connecting the province of Ontario, Canada, and the state of New York, United States: the Lewiston–Queenston Bridge, Whirlpool Rapids Bridge and Rainbow Bridge. The NFBC is incorporated as a class D New York State public benefit corporation and is licensed to operate in Ontario under the Extra-Provincial Corporations Act. The commission is based in Lewiston, New York, and maintains a post office box address in Niagara Falls, Ontario. It is mostly self-supporting from tolls, leases, and commercial concessions.

== History ==
The commission was established in 1938 in response the collapse of the Honeymoon Bridge.

== Board of Commissioners ==
Canada and the U.S. are equally represented through the bi-national appointment of an eight-member Board of Commissioners; four appointed by the Premier of Ontario and four by the Governor of New York.

Board of Commissioners
Canada	United States
Lindsay DiCosimo Merani, Chairperson	Francis A. Soda, Vice Chairperson
April Jeffs	Kathleen L. Neville
Bradley Sutherland	Harry R. Palladino
Vacant	Vacant

=== 2006 Racketeering trial ===
In 2006, commissioner Joel Cicero pleaded guilty to racketeering for using his official position to extort jobs for the LIUNA labor union.

== See also ==
- Buffalo and Fort Erie Public Bridge Authority - public, Peace Bridge
- International Bridge Company - private, Ambassador Bridge
- Ogdensburg Bridge and Port Authority - public
- Port Authority of New York and New Jersey - public
- Sault Ste. Marie Bridge Company - private, railway bridge
- Thousand Islands Bridge Authority - public, Thousand Islands Bridge
- Windsor-Detroit Bridge Authority - public, Gordie Howe International Bridge
