= Highway revolts in the United States =

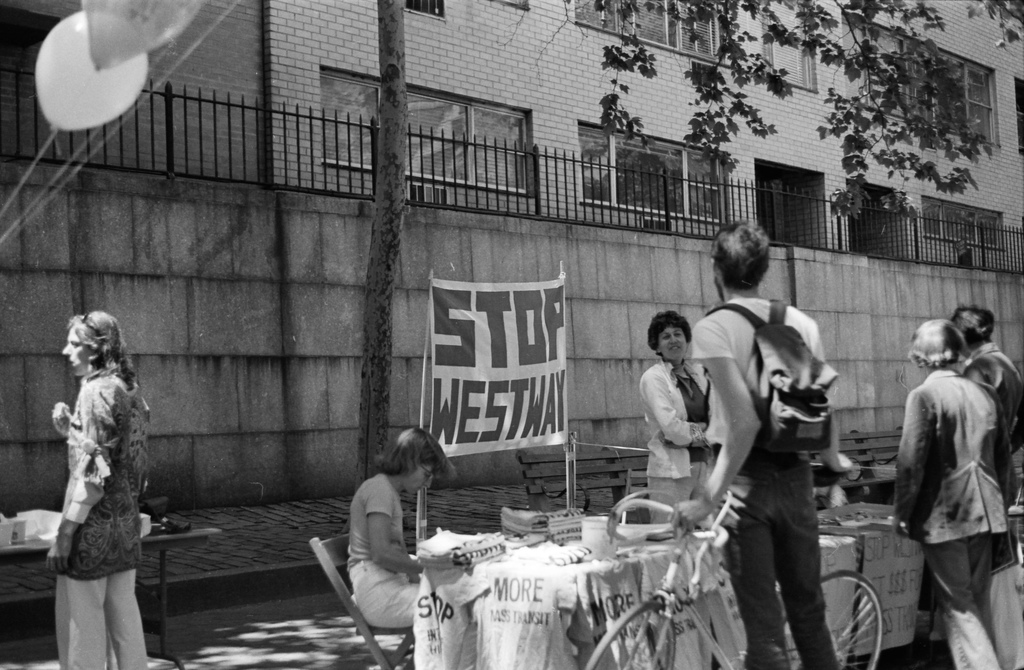
Protest against the Westway in New York City, 1977

Highway revolts have occurred in cities and regions across the United States. In many cities, there remain unused highways, abruptly terminating freeway alignments, and short stretches of freeway in the middle of nowhere, all of which are evidence of larger projects which were never completed. In some instances, freeway revolts have led to the eventual removal or relocation of freeways that had been built.

In the post-World War II economic expansion, there was a major drive to build a freeway network in the United States, including (but not limited to) the Interstate Highway System. Design and construction began in earnest in the 1950s, with many cities and rural areas participating. However, many of the proposed freeway routes were drawn up without considering local interests; in many cases, the construction of the freeway system was considered a regional (or national) issue that trumped local concerns.

Starting in 1956, in San Francisco, when many neighborhood activists became aware of the effect that freeway construction was having on local neighborhoods, effective city opposition to many freeway routes in many cities was raised. This led to the modification or cancellation of many proposed routes. The freeway revolts continued into the 1970s, further enhanced by concern over the energy crisis and rising fuel costs, as well as a growing environmentalist movement. Responding to massive anti-highway protests in Boston, in February 1970, Governor Francis W. Sargent of Massachusetts ordered a halt to planning and construction of all planned expressways inside the Route 128 loop highway under his administration. However, some proposals for controlled-access freeways have been debated and finalized as a compromise to build them as at-grade expressways.

== Arizona ==
In Phoenix, Arizona, regional planners had long planned a general belt loop and several freeways crossing the Salt River Valley through much of Phoenix, with the key feature to include a central-city portion of Interstate 10, running just south of McDowell Road. I-10 had been built westbound to a point southwest of downtown, where it curved and merged into Interstate 17. The largest unconstructed section of I-10 in the country, beginning just east of the Arizona-California border, was still in its planning stage when a debate began for the Phoenix section. Designers had evolved the proposed Papago Freeway from a typical surface grade to a massive, elevated structure, rising 100 feet through the central city, with "helicoil" interchanges and a lengthy park under the structure.

Led primarily by influential Arizona Republic publisher Eugene Pulliam (grandfather of future Vice President Dan Quayle), a massive public relations opposition battle began, citing the freeway sprawl of Los Angeles as a model Pulliam did not want Phoenix embracing. The rhetoric became so heated that in 1973 a non-binding public advisory election was held, resulting (largely due to Pulliam's regular editorial tirades) in an overwhelming "no" vote for the existing plan. The city and the Arizona State Highway Department (now Arizona Department of Transportation) scrapped the plans without further efforts for the central city segment. As the completed east-bound portion of I-10 advanced closer, transportation planners pushed for some resolution. By 1984 traffic gridlock had reached the point where planners devised a new plan, with I-10 still running although roughly the same alignment, but instead with the central city portion tunneled through downtown, with a large park on top. The revised I-10/Papago Freeway was opened in 1990.

In Tucson, Arizona, proposed Interstate 710 was to follow current Kino Parkway from I-10 to Broadway Boulevard, connecting I-10 to the University of Arizona and the downtown area. However, heavy opposition to the freeway caused for its cancellation in 1982, and the Tucson area has long been opposed to the rapid urban sprawl and freeways ever since.

== California ==
=== San Francisco ===
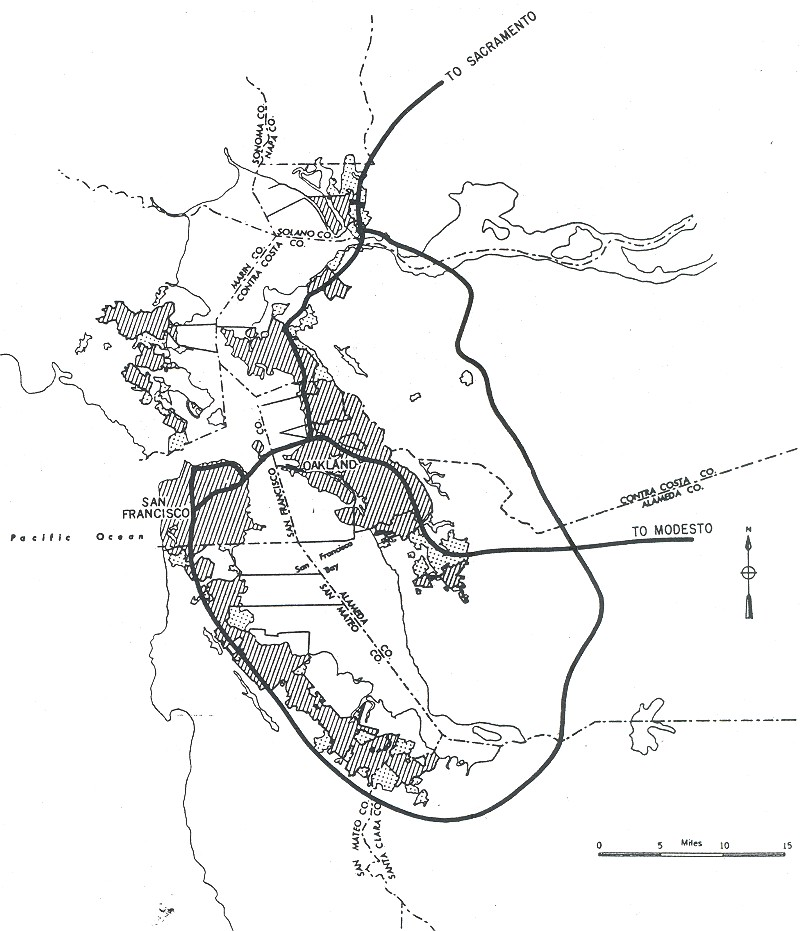
1955 Public Roads Administration map of proposed freeways in the San Francisco Bay Area

In San Francisco, public opposition to freeways dates to 1955, when the San Francisco Chronicle published a map of proposed routes. Construction of the elevated Embarcadero Freeway along the downtown waterfront also helped to organize the opposition, articulated by architecture critic Allan Temko, who began writing for the Chronicle in 1961. The 1955 San Francisco Trafficways Plan included the following routes that were never completed:

- A portion of the Mission Freeway was built and still exists as the near-freeway portion of San Jose Avenue from Interstate 280 to Randall Street. Northeast of that section, it would have run parallel to Mission Street to meet the Central Freeway above Duboce Avenue.
- The Crosstown Freeway would have run parallel to Bosworth Street and O'Shaughnessy Boulevard (and through Glen Canyon Park) from Interstate 280 to the Western Freeway near 7th Avenue. Most of the right of way for this freeway was cleared but it was never built.
- The Western Freeway would have run north from Interstate 280 along the line of Junipero Serra Boulevard, then tunnelling to 7th Avenue to meet the Crosstown Freeway. It would have then continued north to the southern edge of Golden Gate Park and followed an unspecified route (in the 1951 version, a tunnel under the park and then a depressed routing through the Panhandle) northeast to the eastern end of the Panhandle, continuing east from there between Fell and Oak Streets to meet the Central Freeway.
- A portion of the Park Presidio Freeway was built as and still exists as CA 1 through the Presidio from the Golden Gate Bridge. South of that section the freeway would have continued, replacing what is now Park Presidio Boulevard, and then tunneled under Golden Gate Park to meet the Western Freeway.
- A portion of the Central Freeway was built and the original section west from the Bayshore Freeway to Mission Street still exists as US 101. The section northwest from Mission to Market Street was reconstructed in 2004. The section north of Market Street to Golden Gate Avenue was demolished and not rebuilt. The remaining distance to the Golden Gate Freeway was never built.
- A portion of the Embarcadero Freeway was built from the Bay Bridge approach to Broadway as Interstate 480. The section north of Broadway to the Golden Gate Freeway was never built. The entire freeway was removed after the Loma Prieta earthquake.
- Most of the Southern Embarcadero Freeway was built and still exists as part of Interstate 280, but the section from Third Street to the Bay Bridge approach was never built. The section between Sixth and Third Streets was removed after the Loma Prieta earthquake.
- The Golden Gate Freeway along the northern edge of the city from the Embarcadero Freeway to the Golden Gate Bridge approach was never built.
- The freeway approach from US 101 and Interstate 280 to the Southern Crossing bridge was never built because the bridge was not built.

The 1960 Trafficways Plan deleted several of these routes but added another:

- The Hunters Point Freeway would have run from US 101 south of the city limits on landfill around Candlestick Point and across Hunters Point to meet Interstate 280 near what was Army Street (now Cesar Chavez Street).

In 1959, the San Francisco Board of Supervisors voted to cancel seven of ten planned freeways, including an extension of the Central Freeway. In 1964, protests against a freeway through the Panhandle and Golden Gate Park led to its cancellation, and in 1966 the Board of Supervisors rejected an extension of the Embarcadero Freeway to the Golden Gate Bridge.

Opposition to the Embarcadero Freeway continued, and in 1985, the Board of Supervisors voted to demolish it. It was closed after sustaining heavy damage in 1989's Loma Prieta earthquake and torn down shortly thereafter. The entire portion of the Central Freeway north of Market Street was demolished over the next decade: the top deck in 1996, and the lower deck in 2003. Two other short freeway segments were demolished in the same time period: the Terminal Separator Structure near Rincon Hill and the Embarcadero Freeway, and the stub end of Interstate 280 near Mission Bay.

=== Oakland ===
In Oakland, California, the Richmond Boulevard Freeway would have run along Valdez Street, Richmond Boulevard, Glen Echo Creek, and Moraga Avenue from 20th Street to SR 13. It was approved by Oakland voters in a 1945 bond issue, but was canceled August 16, 1956, when the city of Piedmont was unable to pay for its portion of the route. In 1949, the Richmond Boulevard Protective Association had protested the route and its planned destruction of their homes.

=== Berkeley ===
In Berkeley, California, the Ashby Freeway would have run approximately along the line of Ashby Avenue from Interstate 80 to California State Route 24. The Berkeley Department of Public Works and Planning Commission proposed possible routings for it in 1952, and were met with 5,000 signatures on a petition in opposition. Nevertheless, the commission included the route in the 1955 Berkeley Master Plan. A 1957 public hearing drew 100 protesters. The 1959 Alameda County transportation plan attempted to relocate the proposed freeway to the Oakland–Berkeley border, but Oakland was no more receptive to the freeway, and the Berkeley City Council voted to stop planning it in 1961.

=== Bakersfield ===
In Bakersfield, California, the SR 178 freeway terminates two miles east of the SR 99 freeway. The section through downtown Bakersfield and the Westchester residential district was never completed due to opposition from Westchester residents. The controversy continues to this day, as the Bakersfield City Council's plans to widen Highway 178 through the Westchester area are being strongly protested.

=== Los Angeles ===
- The Laurel Canyon Freeway (SR 170) would have been aligned through western Hollywood, the Mid-City West area, and western Inglewood en route to its terminus at the San Diego Freeway (I-405) near Los Angeles International Airport. It was scrapped in the face of community opposition from these districts and its namesake Laurel Canyon. Only the portion traversing the Baldwin Hills was finished, later being designated as La Cienega Boulevard.
- The Beverly Hills Freeway (SR 2) would have run from the Hollywood Freeway (US 101) in southern Hollywood to the San Diego Freeway (I-405) in Westwood along the alignment of Melrose Avenue and Santa Monica Boulevard. It went through several proposed iterations—including a cut-and-cover tunnel—before its mid-1970s abandonment in the face of opposition from residents of Beverly Hills, the Fairfax District, and Hancock Park. Caltrans acquired and cleared the land needed for the freeway in the city of Beverly Hills; the right-of-way later became a long greenway.
- The Slauson Freeway (SR 90), originally known as the Richard M. Nixon Freeway and intended to run across southern Los Angeles and northern Orange counties between the Pacific Coast Highway (SR 1) and Riverside (SR 91), was truncated as a result of opposition to its construction through South Central Los Angeles. The only portions completed to freeway level are the short Marina Freeway that runs between Marina del Rey and southern Culver City and the Richard M. Nixon Parkway in Yorba Linda.
- The Glendale Freeway (SR 2) terminates roughly 1.5 miles (2.4 km) northeast of its intended terminus at the Hollywood Freeway (US 101), due to opposition from residents of Silver Lake.
- The Pacific Coast Freeway (SR 1) would have upgraded the existing Pacific Coast Highway to freeway standards. Opposition by residents of Malibu, Santa Monica, and the coastal cities of the South Bay region led to the project's abandonment. One segment, between Oxnard and the Point Mugu Naval Air Station, was built in the 1960s before the project was abandoned.
- The Redondo Beach Freeway (SR 91) would have linked the Pacific Coast Freeway in Redondo Beach or the San Diego Freeway (I-405) in Torrance to the Long Beach Freeway (I-710). Opposition by Redondo Beach and Torrance led to its truncation to its current terminus at the Harbor Freeway (I-110) in Gardena; the California legislature subsequently renamed it the Gardena Freeway.
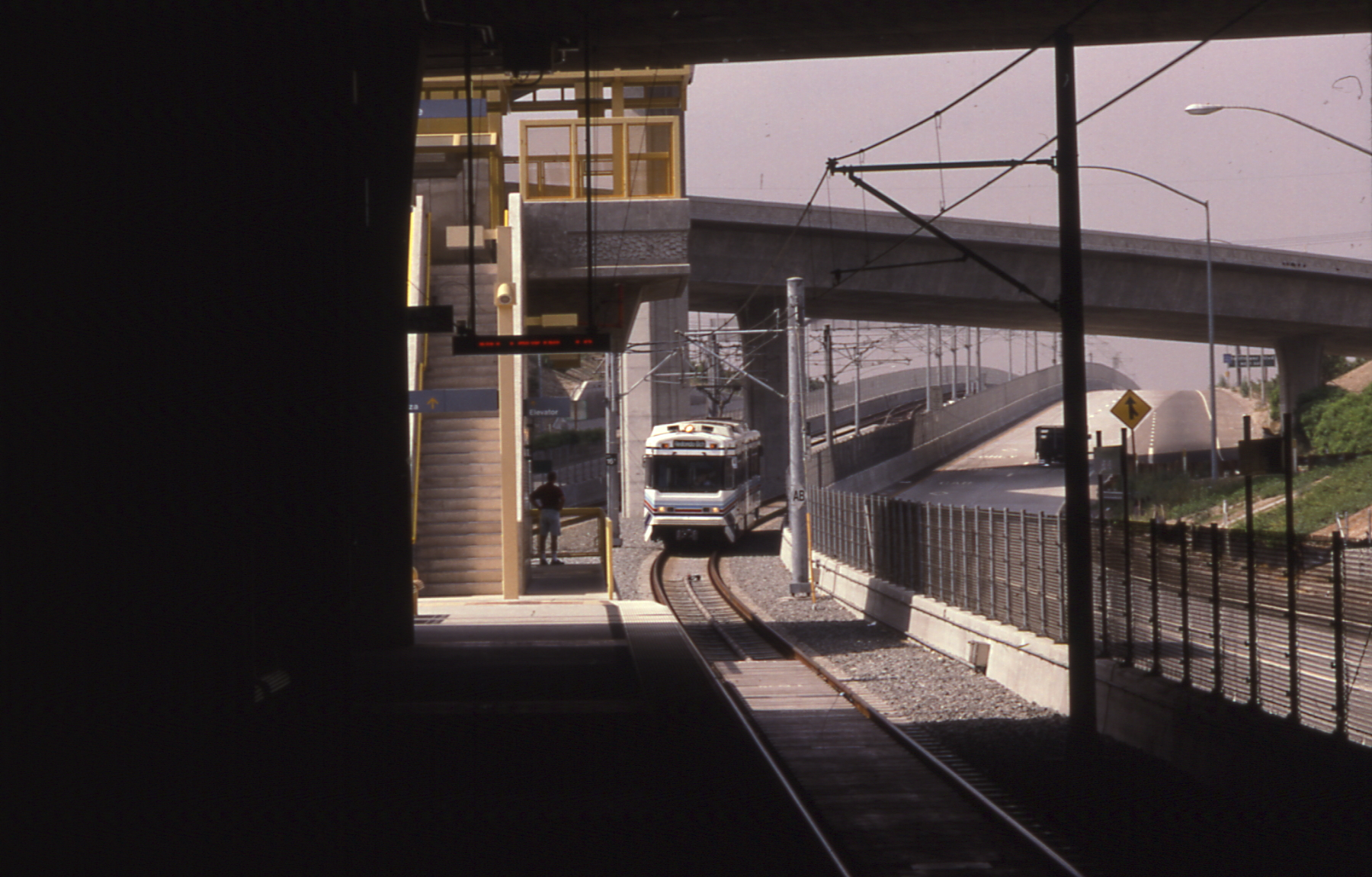
- The Century Freeway was the subject of significant controversy, and was ultimately built with a light rail line in its median
  The Century Freeway (I-105), itself the subject of an unsuccessful freeway revolt in Hawthorne, South Central Los Angeles, Lynwood, and Downey that lasted nearly two decades, was truncated at the San Gabriel River Freeway (I-605) instead of its intended terminus at the Santa Ana Freeway (I-5) due to opposition from the city of Norwalk. One of the compromises allowing the freeway to be built caused the inclusion of a mass transit line in the median. This is the C Line, which opened on August 12, 1995. The Glenn Anderson Freeway opened on October 15, 1993.
- The Long Beach Freeway (I-710) was initially intended to go from the port complex all the way north to Pasadena, linking up with the Ventura and Foothill Freeways (SR 134 & I-210), completing a bypass of Downtown Los Angeles to the east. The freeway was completed just past I-10 in Alhambra, and a half-mile stub was built in Pasadena (still unsigned, but officially SR 710). Opposition came from the small city of South Pasadena, which would have been cut in half, impacting its small but lively downtown. A six-mile (10 km) gap currently exists, and Caltrans is still attempting to build some sort of link, the latest idea of which has been a pair of tunnels.
  - Opposition to the building of the 710 extensions through South Pasadena has, for some 30 years, resulted in the suspension of plans to build an extension from the 210 freeway through West Pasadena and South Pasadena. The ramps exist, and a stub is in place at California Boulevard. Still, much of the land taken for the freeway has been resold by Caltrans to private parties. In 2006, the idea of completing the freeway using a tunnel was first proposed. This idea is currently under a funded study by the Los Angeles County Metropolitan Transportation Authority (LACMTA).
  - A proposed rehabilitation and widening of the aged Long Beach Freeway (I-710) between the Pomona (SR 60) and San Diego (I-405) freeways, which would have removed over 2000 residences in five cities and one unincorporated area, generated such opposition that Caltrans and the Los Angeles County Metropolitan Transportation Authority (MTA) abandoned it within days of its unveiling in 2004. Caltrans and MTA have issued a new plan that would use MTA-owned utility right-of-way along the Los Angeles River and require the taking of fewer than ten residences.
- The portion of the Foothill Freeway (I-210) running through the Crescenta Valley was not completed until the early 1980s, largely due to opposition by the wealthy city of La Cañada Flintridge. As part of the legal settlement allowing for the freeway's construction, it was built so far below grade that two creeks crossing its alignment traverse the freeway by means of aqueducts.

=== Orange County ===
In Southern California, a number of environmental organizations including the Natural Resources Defense Council, the Sierra Club, the Surfrider Foundation and others, along with the California State Parks Foundation, banded together to stop a planned extension to the SR 241 Foothill South Toll Road. The groups contend that the project threatens the fragile San Mateo Creek Watershed and would result in the loss of a significant portion of the popular San Onofre State Beach Park. In 2006, the coalition filed a lawsuit against the Transportation Corridor Agency – the agency responsible for the project – stating that deficiencies in the project's environmental impact report violated the California Environmental Quality Act. The groups were joined in the lawsuit by the California State Attorney General's Office.

=== San Diego ===
State Route 252 was intended to connect Interstate 5 to Interstate 805. Ramps were constructed on I-805 at 43rd Street before the project was canceled in 1994 due to neighborhood opposition. The new freeway would have occupied a swath of land dividing Logan Heights. Much of the land intended for freeway construction is still unoccupied. The interchange ramps from I-805 now end in a strip mall.

=== Sacramento ===
In December 1974, the Sacramento County Board of Supervisors submitted a request to the state legislature to remove several planned freeways from active planning. Among these were a section of State Route 65, State Route 143, and State Route 244; Caltrans had already acquired rights of way for portions of the routes, which would cost $149 million to build (in 1973 dollars).

=== San Luis Obispo ===
Cuesta Freeway was intended to connect US 101 in San Luis Obispo with an interchange at Marsh Street exit to Cuesta College. This proposed section was post to be the new route for SR 1. The new route was adopted in 1965 by Caltrans and would cost more than $2 million a mile for the 7.1 mile expansion. The plan for the new route was rejected by major opposition from the community at the October 11, 1971, San Luis Obispo city council meeting.

=== Willits ===
Throughout the four-year duration of a $300M construction project to reroute U.S. Route 101 to the east side of Willits as a bypass, numerous environmental coalitions raised concerns about the impact of the bypass on the local wetlands and cultural sites. The Pomo Native American tribe joined in the protests. In 2013, a federal judge rejected a lawsuit, which was attempting to halt the project, filed against Caltrans. The bypass was completed toward the end of 2016 and opened for traffic on November 3, 2016.

== Colorado ==
During the 1960s, there were a number of proposals for new expressways. These included the Skyline Freeway from Commerce City to Morrison, the Hampden Freeway through Englewood, the Columbine Freeway which would have gone up Santa Fe, Downing, and Park Avenue West before leaving Denver via North Pecos Street, the Mountain Freeway which would have replaced all of Alameda, and The Quebec Freeway from I-70 all the way to I-25.

A planned Interstate 470 beltway around Denver met opposition, including from Governor Richard Lamm, an environmentalist, who promised to "drive a silver spike" through the project. Eventually, a compromise was reached, and the beltway was built, using three different designations: State Highway 470, E-470 and the Northwest Parkway. Currently, a gap remains in the beltway, as it stops short of reaching the Denver suburbs of Broomfield and Golden. Fierce debate and opposition to the road continues, complicated by the radioactive contamination from the Rocky Flats Plant. Golden is opposed to completion of the beltway; Broomfield supports it, and has been exploring alternate routes.

== Connecticut ==
=== Hartford ===
In 1973 environmentalists filed lawsuits that effectively killed construction of the planned Interstate 291 beltway west of Interstate 91, the proposed Interstate 484 expressway through the downtown, and the proposed Interstate 284 expressway between East Hartford and South Windsor, and Interstate 491 from Wethersfield to Manchester. After these freeways were cancelled, the State of Connecticut used the funds allocated for their construction to rebuild and expand existing freeways in the Greater Hartford area. In 1992 the Route 9 Expressway was extended north from I-91 in Cromwell to Interstate 84 in Farmington, completing what would have been the southwest quadrant of the I-291 beltway; the northwest quadrant of the canceled beltway is partially served by the 4-lane arterial Route 218 west of I-91 (Route 218 does not connect to I-84 or Route 9, leaving an approximately 7-mile gap in the northwest quadrant between I-84/Route 9 and Route 218). The Connecticut Department of Transportation eventually built its current headquarters on land originally acquired for I-291, where it was to intersect US-5 in Newington.

=== Eastern Connecticut ===
Interstate 84 was originally planned to continue on an easterly course to Providence, Rhode Island, closely following US 6 through Tolland and Windham counties. Environmental concerns in Connecticut and Rhode Island led to the cancellation of this extension, and I-84 was shifted to the existing Wilbur Cross Highway (which had been designated I-86; this number has since reappeared on a partially completed expressway in northern Pennsylvania and Upstate New York) between Hartford and Sturbridge, Massachusetts in 1983. The already-completed portions of this extension was redesignated as Interstate 384 and US-6 Windham Bypass. CONNDOT and the FHWA intended to construct the US-6 Freeway through Andover, Bolton, and Coventry to link I-384 and the Windham Bypass. After 40 years since it was first planned, CONNDOT, the FHWA, and local officials remained deadlocked with the EPA and the Army Corps of Engineers over the routing of the US-6 Freeway. Since the agencies involved could not come to an agreement, CONNDOT abandoned plans the US-6 Freeway in 2005. The department instead rebuilt the section of US-6 the freeway was intended to bypass in 2000. The section of US-6 between I-384 and Willimantic remains a two-lane road, but rebuilding that segment straightened curves, added shoulders and turning pockets, and reduced the number of roadways and driveways intersecting the road to improve safety.

=== Fairfield County ===
Local opposition, particularly in the town of Wilton, convinced a federal judge to halt construction of the U.S. Route 7 Expressway (originally envisioned to be a segment of the then-proposed Interstate 89 through western New England) between Norwalk and Danbury in 1972. State and federal highway officials subsequently prepared an environmental impact statement for the expressway, and a Federal judge allowed construction to resume in 1983. By then however, the cost of construction had skyrocketed and there were no longer any funds available to complete the expressway, as all highway funds were diverted into a massive statewide highway repair program in the wake of the Mianus River Bridge collapse months earlier. Two short extensions of the Route 7 freeway were completed near the Danbury Fair Mall in 1986, and from Route 123 to Gristmill Road in Norwalk in 1992, before funds for further construction were exhausted. The proposal remained on the books until the CONNDOT canceled expressway plans in 1999 in lieu of widening the existing Route 7 to 4 lanes, citing a lack of funding and no feasible route that would avoid the environmentally sensitive Norwalk River basin. Some in Connecticut have been seeking to revive the expressway proposal, including those who originally opposed it, citing the rapidly increasing volume of traffic and the number of fatal accidents on the existing Route 7 over the past 20 years. Further north on US-7 however, officials in Brookfield have long pushed CONNDOT to construct a new US-7 freeway to the west of Brookfield. After decades of environmental studies and intense debate, construction on the Brookfield Bypass began in 2007 and opened in 2009.

Similarly, CONNDOT planned to construct a new freeway for Route 25 between I-95 in Bridgeport and I-84 in Newtown. Construction began on the Route 25 freeway in 1968, and the existing portion between I-95 and Route 111 in Trumbull opened in 1975. Opposition from environmental groups and residents in the towns of Monroe and Newtown forced CONNDOT to eventually kill plans for extending the Route 25 freeway north of Route 111 in 1992. The department has instead focused on widening the existing 2-lane roadway, which is supported by Trumbull and Monroe. However, Newtown remains opposed to any upgrades that would change the existing 2-lane profile of Route 25 through its town.

Since its opening in 1940, the Connecticut Department of Transportation has floated various plans to widen the Merritt Parkway, all of which have been thwarted by the efforts of conservationists who oppose the destruction of the Parkway's uniquely designed bridges and rustic character.

=== New Haven ===
The Oak Street Connector was a proposed east-west freeway originally envisioned to connect New Haven with Danbury, largely paralleling Route 34. Construction on the initial (and only completed) segment in downtown New Haven from Interstate 95 to York Street began in 1957, with its opening in 1959. Opposition to the freeway in New Haven increased as homes and businesses between York Street and Route 10 were razed to extend the Route 34 freeway, resulting in lawsuits that halted further construction on the highway in the late 1960s and 1970s. Further west, residents in the town of Orange opposed the Route 34 freeway as it would pass near a reservoir that supplies the region with its drinking water. Opponents further west along Route 34 in Monroe and Oxford filed additional lawsuits to block construction of a bridge across the Housatonic River to bypass the existing crossing at Stevenson Dam, fearing the new crossing would cause irreparable damage to Bald Eagle nesting sites and increase truck traffic through both towns.

Two other small sections of the planned Route 34 freeway were completed: a short freeway stub from Route 34 to a directional interchange with Interstate 84 in Newtown (originally built for the cancelled Route 25 freeway extension) built in the mid-1970s, and a short freeway segment near the Maltby Lakes in Orange that was completed in the 1980s but never put into service. The completed section in Orange was initially used as a commuter parking lot, but now serves as an access road to Yale New Haven Hospital's Regional Operations Center. The State of Connecticut sold off land originally cleared for the Route 34 freeway between York Street and Route 10 in New Haven in 2002, effectively ensuring the freeway could not be extended beyond York Street. Meanwhile, officials and community groups in New Haven began pressing the State of Connecticut to remove the existing freeway through downtown. In 2011, the city of New Haven and State of Connecticut reached an agreement to remove the Route 34 freeway west of the New Haven Railyard and construct a 4-lane landscaped boulevard in its place. A portion of the land recovered from the freeway would be sold for development, while the remainder reserved as park space. Demolition of the Route 34 freeway began in 2013, with completion scheduled for 2016. Similarly, the Connecticut Department of Transportation plans to remove the freeway stub at I-84 in Newtown and replace the directional interchange with a diamond interchange. ConnDOT also plans to build a rest area in the location of the current freeway stub once its removal is complete.

== Florida ==
=== South Florida ===
In the 1970s, most of South Florida's expressways were canceled due to voters choosing to direct funding away from roads toward mass transit projects and the planned Miami Metrorail. Hialeah in particular is anti-expressway, as many proposals for expressways in the city have been canceled due to community opposition.

- Cypress Creek Expressway: The Cypress Creek Expressway would have been an east–west expressway run along the present day Cypress Creek Road, serving Pompano Beach, Fort Lauderdale, North Lauderdale, and Tamarac. The Cypress Creek Expressway would have begun at A1A at the Fort Lauderdale-Pompano Beach border, and run along what is presently the eastern disjointed section of McNab Road. West of Old Dixie Highway, the road would have dipped south and run along present-day Cypress Creek Road (west of Florida's Turnpike it connects with the western disjointed section of McNab Road), until terminating at the proposed University-Deerfield Expressway (now the Sawgrass Expressway). There was no projected interchange with the Florida's Turnpike. It was to be four lanes for its entire length, and its total cost was slated at $22.6 million. It was never built due to funding and opposition.
- Dolphin Expressway Airport Spur: The Dolphin Expressway was originally supposed to be built on Northwest 20th Street, instead of its current 14th Street alignment. A 1964 plan called for two options to solving the traffic problems near Miami International Airport. The first option was to convert LeJeune Road into an 8-lane expressway between the Dolphin Expressway and the Airport Expressway. The second option was to build a spur route from the Dolphin Expressway that would connect to the entrance of Miami International Airport, thus relieving LeJeune Road. The spur would branch off the Tollway just east of NW 37th Avenue and run north–south on the west side of NW 37th Avenue. North of Melreese Golf Course, it would cross the Tamiami Canal and head west to the MIA terminal entrance on Northwest 21st Street. A stack interchange was built at LeJeune Rd and 21st Street and is used today between the two streets and the airport, as opposed as the originally planned expressway interchange.
- Gratigny Parkway: The Gratigny Parkway of today is much shorter than the original planned length. The original western end was supposed to be the Homestead Extension of Florida's Turnpike. The eastern terminus was supposed to be SR 922, or it would have merged with the SR 922 and taking over its causeway. The portion east of 32nd Avenue was never completed due to community opposition. The original western terminus at the Turnpike was moved back to the Palmetto Expressway because of new plans to extend I-75 south to Miami from Fort Lauderdale and keep I-595 as an independent expressway. The Gratigny continues to the west as I-75 and curves northbound at 138th Street/Hialeah Gardens Drive. An extension to the Turnpike in the west is in MDX's 2025 master plan, that would slightly reduce the length of I-75 by around 1.5 to 2 miles.
- Hialeah Expressway: The Hialeah Expressway would have been a third east–west route across Dade County, cutting through Hialeah, the second most populated city in Dade County. Its eastern terminus would have been Alton Road and 47th Street in Miami Beach, crossing Biscayne Bay over the planned Beach Causeway. It would then cross the proposed Interama Expressway and I-95, and run along a path between NW 79th and 62nd Street. Upon crossing Okeechobee Road (U.S. Route 27), it would parallel NW 74th Street until reaching the West Dade Expressway, now the Homestead Extension of Florida's Turnpike, for a distance of 16 miles (26 km). Despite its cancellation, Northwest 74th Street was partially converted into an expressway.
- Interama Expressway: The Interama Expressway, also known as the Midbay Causeway, was supposed to be a north–south expressway in eastern Dade County as an alternative route and reliever to Biscayne Boulevard (U.S. Route 1). It would have run from an intersection at I-95 and the proposed Snake Creek Expressway (originally proposed to run across State Road 858), paralleled US 1 from there to an intersection with proposed South Dixie Expressway (see below) and I-95, slicing through downtown Miami along the way.
- LeJeune-Douglas Expressway: The expressway was to run from US 1 in Coral Gables, Florida to the Palmetto Expressway in Carol City/Miami Gardens as a reliever to traffic between the Palmetto Expressway and I-95 on a LeJeune Road-Douglas Road corridor, passing directly by Miami International Airport.
- Rock Island Expressway: This would have been a north-south expressway built on Rock Island Road having its southern terminus at the Turnpike near Northwest 44th Street in Tamarac. The north terminus was most likely either Wiles Road or the University-Deerfield Expressway (now the Sawgrass Expressway) in Coral Springs.
- Sheridan Expressway: The Sheridan Expressway was planned to upgrade State Road 822, locally known as Sheridan Street into an expressway. It would run from Old Dixie Highway in downtown Hollywood to the also canceled University-Deerfield Expressway in Cooper City (now University Drive).
- South Dixie Expressway/I-95 Extension: This would have extended I-95 south of its terminus at US 1 near downtown Miami to Florida City, using an upgraded US 1 route. The southernmost ten miles of the Homestead Extension of Florida's Turnpike was part of the proposed I-95 extension.
- University-Deerfield Expressway: When it was first proposed in 1969, it was supposed to be the northernmost part of a chain of expressways from Deerfield Beach to Coral Gables, but the proposed Snake Creek Expressway (in Broward County) became part of the Florida's Turnpike Extension and the LeJeune-Douglas Expressway (in Dade County) failed in the 1970s as construction budgets narrowed roadbuilding capabilities. On the other hand, the rerouting of Interstate 75 from the Tamiami Trail to Alligator Alley increased the necessity of a northern/western bypass of coastal Broward County and invigorated the project which had acquired a new route and a new name, the Sawgrass-Deerfield Expressway, later shortened to the Sawgrass Expressway.
- There were two expressways proposed in Palm Beach County: A northern extension of the Sawgrass Expressway to be called University Parkway would have snaked around western suburbs of Boca Raton, Delray Beach, and Boynton Beach. Its path would have bordered the Loxahatchee National Wildlife Refuge, turning east and terminating at Flavor Pict Road west of Boynton Beach. The other expressway was to run east-west, connecting downtown West Palm Beach with the western communities of Wellington, Royal Palm Beach, and The Acreage. There were two proposed corridors: the first (and most desired by county commissioners) ran between Belvedere Road and Okeechobee Boulevard, displacing several homes and churches along its path. The second proposed corridor ran north of Okeechobee Boulevard and aligned with Palm Beach Lakes Boulevard. When community opposition to the aforementioned routes escalated, county officials offered to transform Southern Boulevard into a full expressway to avoid displacing any residences. All proposed expressways were eventually scrapped. More than a decade after shelving those expressway plans, Southern Boulevard was converted into a partial east–west expressway from I-95 to SR 7.

=== Tampa Bay area ===
In the 1970s, there were plans for several freeways in the Tampa Bay area, but most were canceled by 1982. The high cost of acquiring right of way in this densely populated area, as well as community opposition, were the key factors in canceling most of these freeways. Instead, planners decided to widen existing roads.

- Belcher Freeway: 10.6 miles (17.1 km). This freeway is a casualty of the high cost of acquiring the wide girth of land needed to build it. U.S. Route 19 had traffic backups as far back as 1965, and the Belcher Freeway was considered in a Greiner Inc., study that year. While public reception was positive, the freeway was canceled in May 1978 as traffic projections without that link would have not made it cost effective or useful to construct. To compensate, U.S. Route 19 was upgraded to a freeway in the area.
- Brandon Bypass: This expressway would have served as an alternative bypass route to State Road 60 in Brandon. It would have connected at the eastern end of the Southern Crosstown Expressway, passing to the south of Brandon, ending at an interchange with State Road 60 east of Brandon. By 1984 when city planners were ready to build the expressway, the area's population exploded, with high land prices and community opposition leading to its cancellation and instead widening of State Road 60 in Brandon.
- Clearwater North Freeway: 4 miles (6.4 km). This proposed freeway would have connected downtown Clearwater with US 19 and points north, and it never made it to design or planning.
- Dale Mabry Highway upgrade: Dale Mabry Highway was planned to be upgraded to an expressway north of the canceled Northtown Expressway to near Lutz. The upgrades were only applied to a couple of intersections due to community oppositions on most of the road.
- State Road 694A: 3.6 miles (5.8 km). This freeway would have run from 137th St to SR 595 and connected the proposed east-west Gandy Freeway directly with the beaches. It was canceled by 1972, and never brought to public attention.
- Gandy Freeway: 12.6 miles (20.3 km). The Gandy Freeway would have connected with the proposed connection to the Lee Roy Selmon Expressway in Tampa, and provided a route due west to the beaches in Pinellas County on an upgraded Gandy Boulevard. The low likelihood of the Hillsborough County portion being constructed, and of increasing urbanization of Pinellas Park led to this freeway's cancellation in 1979. Remains of this freeway can be seen in the Gandy Boulevard interchange at I-275, the separated grade SPUI at US 19 with Gandy Boulevard as limited access, and of the very wide right-of-way preserved along Gandy Boulevard east of I-275. While the original plans are dead, the intersections of Gandy Boulevard with 4th, 9th and 16th Streets and Roosevelt Boulevard were flown in 2017; traffic in both directions is now unencumbered by signals from just east of I-275 all the way to the dog track.
- Hillsborough Bay Causeway: The freeway would have started near MacDill Air Force Base, heading southeast, crossing Tampa Bay to the U.S. 41 corridor in southern Hillsborough County, also doubling as a barrier against hurricanes for Tampa. It was canceled due to lack of growth in southern Hillsborough County and the fact that shipping would have been blocked by the bridge.
- Northwest Hillsborough Expressway: In the 1970s, an expressway crossing through northern Hillsborough County was proposed, but by the 1980s many of these communities (especially Lutz) opposed the road going through their towns. Eventually, the project was broken into two sections, Veterans Expressway which has since been built and the Lutz Freeway, now known as the East-West Road, which continues to create controversy in local politics.
- Pinellas Belt Expressway: 7.4 miles (11.9 km). The Pinellas Belt Expressway, or beltway, was budgeted in 1974 for construction in the 1979 fiscal year but intense community opposition stopped the freeway from progressing. Construction would have disrupted retail outlets along Tyrone Boulevard and US 19 Alt, and right-of-way acquisition would have been too expensive because of the neighborhoods it would have traversed. The full freeway interchange at US 19 Alt and SR 666 in Seminole is all that remains of this Belt Expressway.
- St. Petersburg-Clearwater Expressway: 20.2 miles (32.5 km). This freeway was the highest profile of all planned in the county, and would have been built as an interstate with mostly federal funds. It would have provided a route directly from downtown St. Petersburg to downtown Clearwater and would have replaced much of US 19 through Pinellas County. Land acquisition would have been easy as most of the route was railroad right-of-way. The freeway was officially canceled on May 12, 1978, because new federal guidelines for interstates indicated that any approved route going forward would have to be 10 miles (16 km) or less in length, and be a 'final link' in the interstate system as a whole, instead of a new road. Attention after that cancellation began to turn towards upgrading US 19 instead. The former railroad line is used as a bike–pedestrian trail, known as the Pinellas Trail.
- South Hillsborough Parkway: Planned as early as 1972 to anticipate growth along the U.S. Route 41 corridor, the road was to relieve traffic from somewhere in southern Hillsborough County north to the current Interstate 4. However, the local swampy landscape didn't allow for much growth and I-75's presence served as a reliever in U.S. Route 41's place, canceling the parkway by 1987.
- State Road 60 Freeway Upgrade: 6 miles (9.7 km). SR 60 is a busy, retail-loaded east/west route in Clearwater. Legions of tourists from the north and east use it as their primary route to Clearwater Beach and due to its high traffic, it was proposed to be upgraded to a freeway. Local merchants and residents were against this upgrade, and instead SR 60 instead was widened, and an arterial bypass of downtown Clearwater was constructed. The freeway was dropped from records in May 1975.
- Sunset Point Freeway: 7.2 miles (11.6 km). The Sunset Point Freeway was never seriously considered, with the upgrading of SR 60 to a freeway being favored at the time, although traffic studies in the early 1970s indicated that Drew Street, a major east-west road in downtown Clearwater, would need a reliever freeway route by 1990. The Sunset Point freeway never made it to the design or planning stage.
- Tampa Bay Crosstown Expressway System: This was a system of expressways proposed to span the entire Tampa Bay area, but most of it was eventually canceled. The Lee Roy Selmon Expressway is the successor of the South Crosstown Expressway.
- Ulmerton Expressway: 8 miles (13 km). The Ulmerton Expressway would have upgraded Ulmerton Road from I-275 westward to an expressway, and was to have provided an important link for east-west traffic through Largo. Land acquisition would have been extremely expensive, erasing the practicality of building the freeway, and it was canceled by 1976. All that remains of this freeway plan is Ulmerton Road's very wide right-of-way, preserved by the state for the freeway when Ulmerton Road was expanded in the early 1970s. Long-term widening of Ulmerton Road using the extended right-of-way to expand from four lanes to six lanes was completed in 2009. Expansion to 8 lanes is underway in stages in 2015, with some sections complete.

== Georgia ==
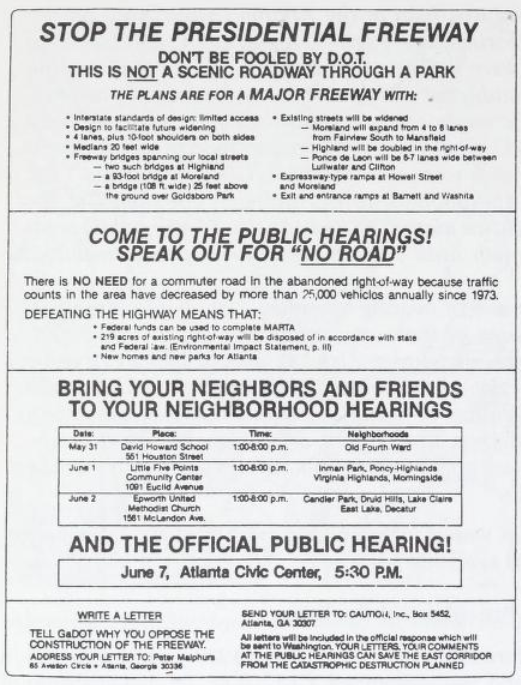
1983 flyer protesting the Presidential Parkway in Metro Atlanta

Local opposition was responsible for the death knell of a number of freeway projects in Metro Atlanta, including the intown portion of the Stone Mountain Freeway from the existing U.S. 78 freeway to what is now Freedom Parkway in downtown Atlanta, and the intown portion of what would have been Interstate 485. The northern part of that freeway was built as Georgia 400, while the southern portion of the highway exists as Interstate 675. The highways would have intersected in a large stack interchange complex roughly where the Carter Center exists today, east of downtown Atlanta. Interstate 420 would have skirted the city limits of Atlanta to the south, running from Interstate 20 in Decatur to Douglasville. The center portion of what would have become I-420 was constructed, and exists as Langford Parkway.

Additional local protests and legislative action ended planning and construction of the Outer Perimeter and the Northern Arc, which would have surrounded Atlanta about 20 miles (32 km) outside of the present Perimeter Highway.

== Illinois ==
=== Chicago metropolitan area ===
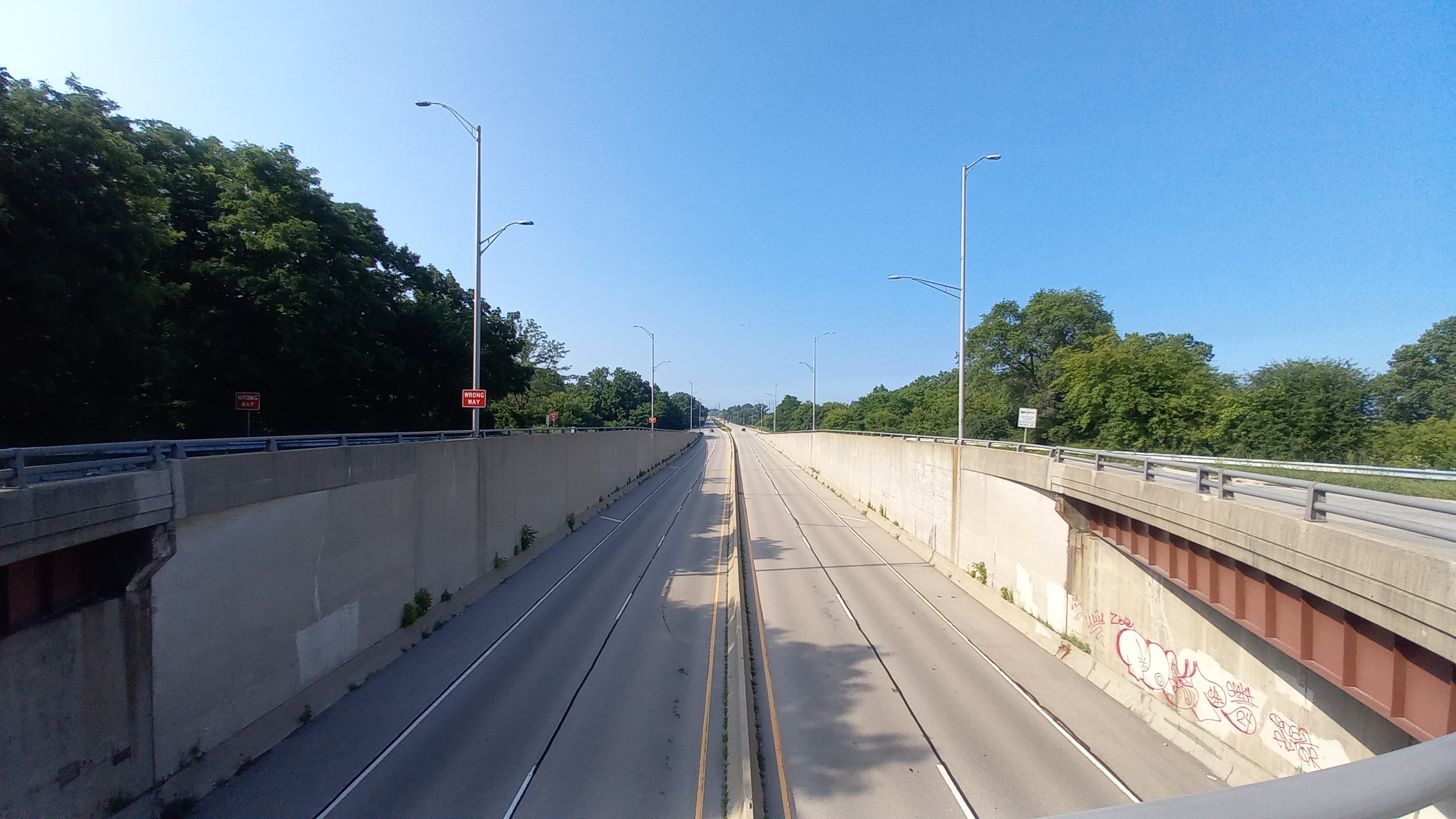
A portion of the unfinished Amstutz Expressway in Waukegan

The Amstutz Expressway was meant to be a lakeshore expressway in North Chicago and Waukegan. However, a large portion in northern North Chicago was never completed, so the road exists in two small portions. The Waukegan portion is frequently referred to as "The Highway to Nowhere" because of its uselessness. Sheridan Road runs along the expressway the entire length.

There were plans to upgrade Lake Shore Drive to Interstate standards; the upgraded expressway was intended to be designated as Interstate 494. In 1966, that designation was moved to the Crosstown Expressway, and soon, further efforts to upgrade the expressway were cancelled. Lake Shore Drive remains a US route, rather than an Interstate highway, with a mix of interchanges and at-grade intersections.

The Crosstown Expressway was a proposed highway in the 1970s that would have run westward from near the present confluence of the Chicago Skyway and the Dan Ryan Expressway on Chicago's south side toward Cicero Avenue near Midway International Airport. From there, the freeway would have run northward along and parallel to Cicero to the Edens – Kennedy junction on the north side of Chicago. The highway, which would have been designated Interstate 494, was canceled in 1979 by elected officials, who cited the $1.2 billion price tag as reason enough to terminate the project. Monies from the aborted highway ultimately went to the construction of the Chicago Transit Authority's Orange Line, connecting the Loop with Midway Airport, and an extension to the CTA's Blue Line, connecting downtown with O'Hare International Airport.

The Illinois 53 freeway was planned to be extended into Lake County from its northern terminus at Lake Cook Road. The extension would have met a planned bypass for Illinois 120 near Grayslake, where it would split two ways. The eastern branch would head towards Interstate 94, while the western branch would head towards the existing Route 120 in western Lake County. The extension was turned over to the Illinois Tollway for further study, which was authorized in 1993 to construct and operate the highway. Due to opposition from some vocal citizens and elected officials, the tollway dropped the environmental study in 2019, shelving the project indefinitely.

Various attempts through the years to construct a freeway through the outer western suburbs of the Chicago metropolitan area were met with strong resistance and were ultimately unsuccessful. The Fox Valley Freeway was proposed to run from Interstate 55 in Plainfield to the Wisconsin border in Richmond, linking the far west suburbs. However, intense local opposition canceled the project in the 1990s. Later, the Prairie Parkway emerged from the failed Fox Valley Freeway efforts and was proposed to connect Interstate 80 and Interstate 88 in the outer western and southwestern suburbs. Despite getting over $200 million in earmarked funds, intense local opposition canceled the project in the early 2010s.

=== Other regions ===
The Peoria to Chicago Highway was a proposal that would have connected the cities of Peoria and Chicago with a direct multilane freeway. The Illinois interstate highway plan in the mid-1950s included a freeway from Peoria toward Chicago in the Interstate 180 corridor, but it was not approved by the Federal Highway Administration. In the late 1960s and early 1970s, Illinois adopted a supplemental freeway plan, and the Interstate 180 to Peoria extension was part of this plan, but very few of these freeways were actually built. The freeway was going to be designated as Interstate 53 as well as present-day I-155 and part of I-180. In the mid-1990s, the state revived the proposal, calling it the "Heart of Illinois Freeway." A few alternatives were selected, among them the Illinois 6 to Interstate 180 connection. In late 2000, the state decided to proceed with the 6/180 connection but ran into opposition from farmers and withdrawn support from political leaders. In February 2002, IDOT stated there were no traffic need for the freeway, only political and economic reasons for advocating it; and that they only studied the issue because Peoria asked for it.

The Raoul Wallenberg Expressway, previously called the Woodruff Expressway, was a controversial plan that would have linked downtown Rockford, Illinois to Interstate 39. In the 1940s and 1950s, as the Northwest Tollway (now the Jane Addams Memorial Tollway) was being routed through the Rockford area, local politicians debated the costs and benefits of various routings of the tollway. One of the proposed tollway alignments that would serve downtown was considered. This was eventually turned down in favor of an alignment that was located miles east of downtown. At the same time, the commercial center of Rockford had shifted from downtown to the East. In an effort to draw residents and businesses back to the traditional center of town, the idea of a new crosstown expressway was born. The highway was to follow the Chicago and Northwestern Railroad line from Interstate 39/U.S. Route 20 interchange all the way to downtown Rockford. This partially-built interchange was built in the early 1980s, designed to allow for future extension northward. Part of this highway would have replaced Woodruff Avenue, a street that parallels the railroad, giving the expressway its original name. The highway was later renamed for Raoul Wallenberg, a Swedish diplomat noted for saving many Hungarian Jews in the Holocaust. The project was eventually abandoned due to its heavy financial costs and the negative impacts the highway would have on its surrounding neighborhoods.

== Illinois–Indiana ==
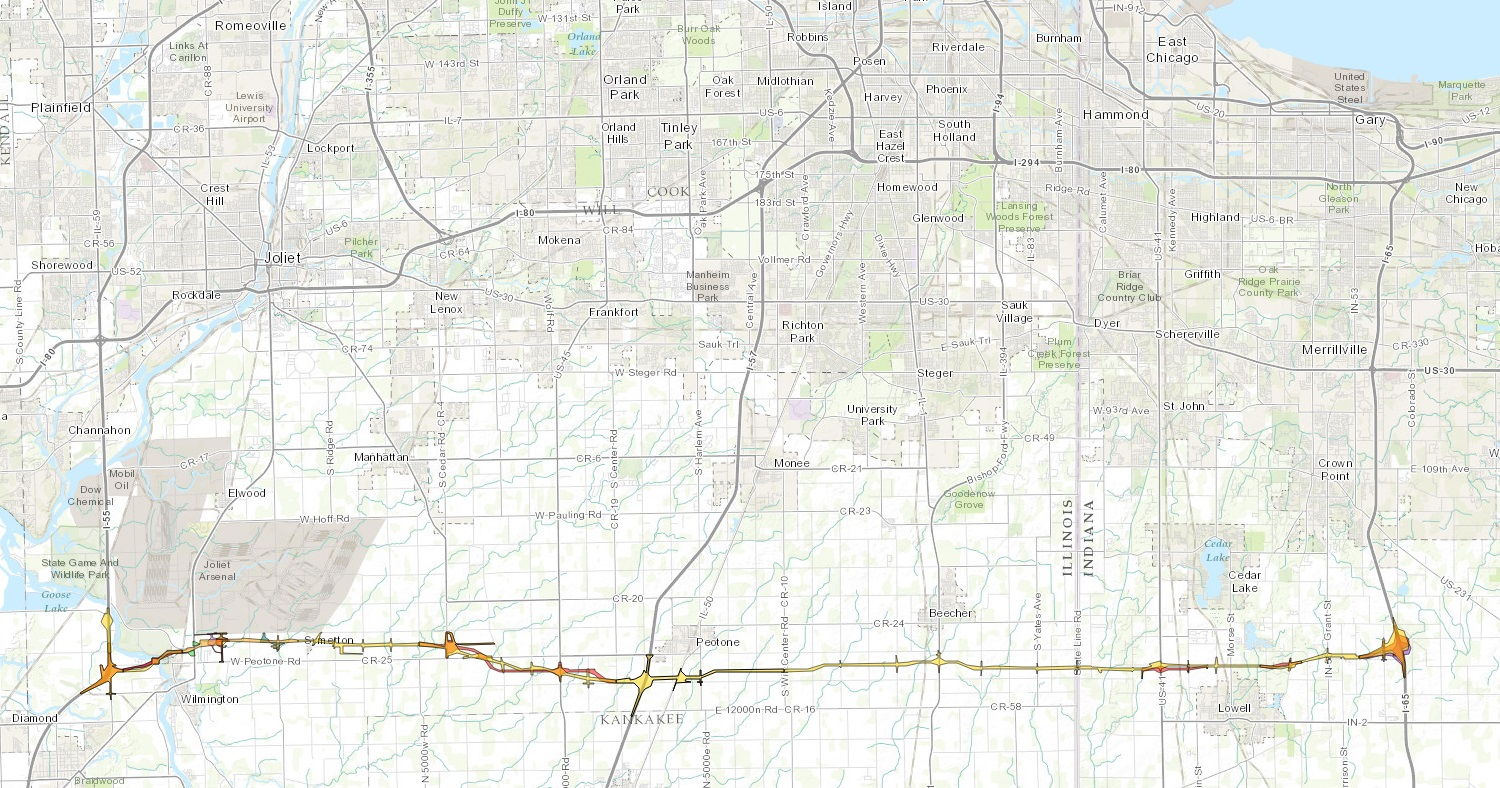
Map of the proposed Illiana Expressway, cancelled in 2015

In the northwest corner of Indiana, the Illiana Expressway was a proposed toll road as a southern bypass of Chicago. Originally, the Illiana Expressway was envisioned to start at Interstate 57 in eastern Illinois, then intersect Interstate 65 near Lowell, Indiana before turning northeast, crossing US-30 near Valparaiso before terminating at the Indiana Toll Road. Due to opposition from environmental and community groups; and operators of the Indiana Toll Road, the section east of I-65 was dropped, but the Illiana Expressway was extended westward to Interstate 55 in Illinois. Opponents filed a lawsuit to block construction of the Illiana Expressway in 2013, with a federal judge ordering a halt to work on the toll road in 2015. Officials from the Federal Highway Administration, Indiana and Illinois appealed the court's ruling to the Seventh Circuit Court of Appeals in August 2015. Meanwhile, in January 2015 Illinois Governor Bruce Rauner removed the Illiana Expressway from the state's five-year transportation plan, effectively stripping funding for the Illinois portion of the highway. Indiana Governor Mike Pence followed suit in suspending Indiana's portion of the Illiana Expressway in February 2015.

== Louisiana ==
When I-10 was built through New Orleans, Louisiana, a segment of formerly tree-lined ground along Claiborne Avenue was destroyed to build the elevated highway; because Claiborne Avenue was the main thoroughfare in a poorer, African-American neighborhood, many in the community considered this to be racially prejudiced. While local efforts to stop this route of I-10 were unsuccessful, the disruption motivated residents to oppose further planned freeways through historic neighborhoods.

The proposed Vieux Carré Riverfront Expressway would have run along the Mississippi River in the French Quarter of New Orleans. Local preservationists worked to build popular support to stop the proposed elevated expressway in the 1960s.

== Maryland ==
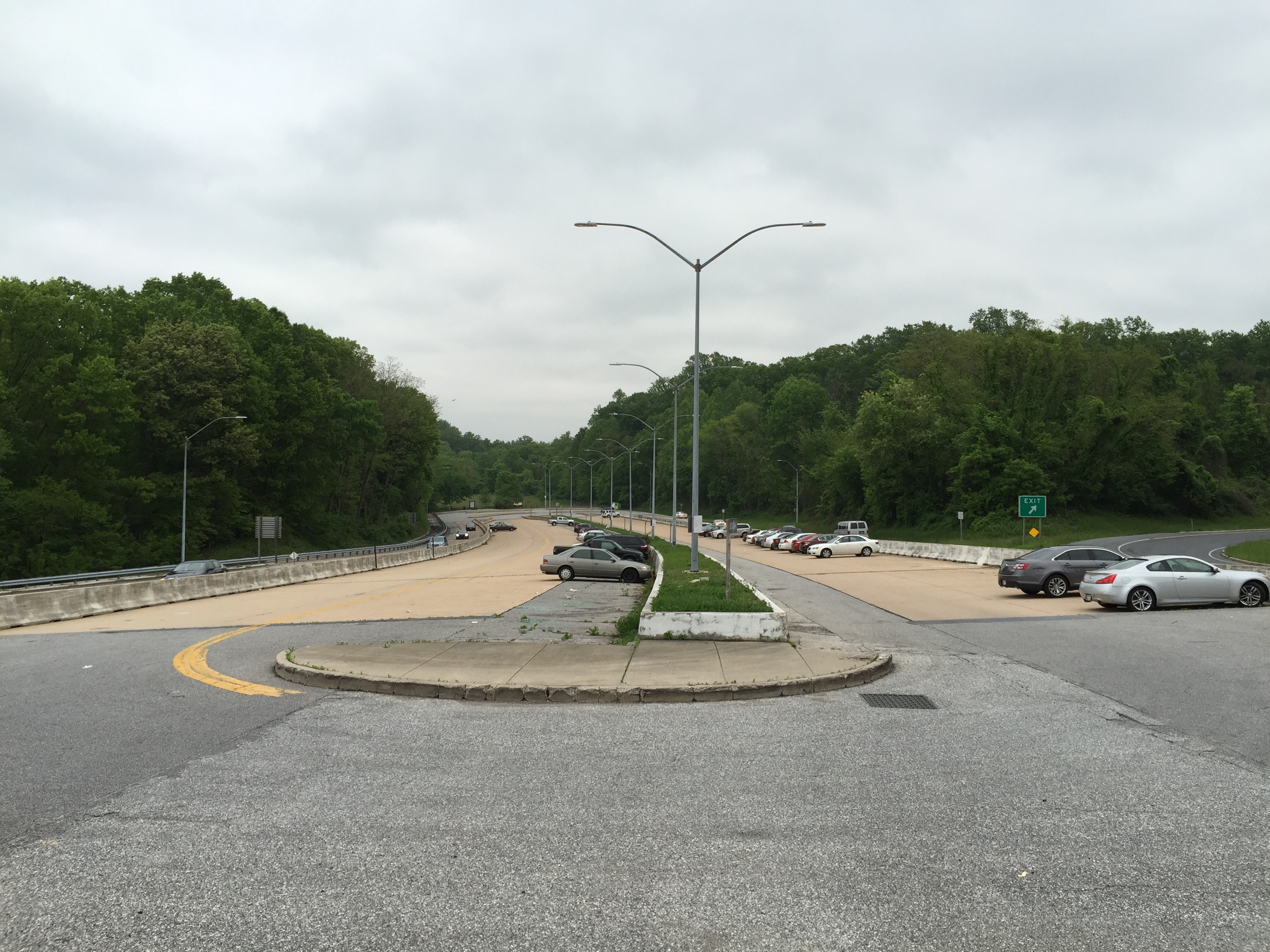
The eastern terminus of Maryland Route 570 (formerly Interstate 70) in Baltimore, now in use as a park and ride lot

Freeways Interstate 95, Interstate 83, and Interstate 70 are not directly connected to each other inside Baltimore city limits because of freeway revolts led by activist and later politician Barbara Mikulski. Mikulski became a U.S. Representative and later a Senator after rising to prominence with freeway revolts. In particular, I-70 was stopped through Leakin Park, and terminates at the Baltimore City line at a Park and Ride, just inside the I-695 Beltway, rather than its planned terminus at I-95 exit 50 (currently US 1 Alternate: Caton Avenue), while I-83 terminates in downtown Baltimore at Fayette Street instead of connecting to I-95 at exit 57. Additionally, Moravia Road was never built beyond I-95 exit 60; it was supposed to be connected to the Windlass Freeway (MD-149), which was canceled as well. A small portion of the Windlass Freeway was constructed, and it is now signed as I-695. Additional roads that would have formed a more complete freeway network in the city were abandoned or redesigned, leaving some short sections (the former I-170, which was left unconnected to any other Interstate highway, so US 40 was re-routed onto it), or rights of way that were built as city streets rather than freeways (Martin Luther King Boulevard).

The Washington Outer Beltway was also met with decades of opposition in Maryland's suburbs of Washington, D.C. Though it met with fierce opposition for 50 years, the section between I-370 and I-95, known as the Intercounty Connector and signed as Maryland Route 200, ultimately opened in 2011.

== Massachusetts ==
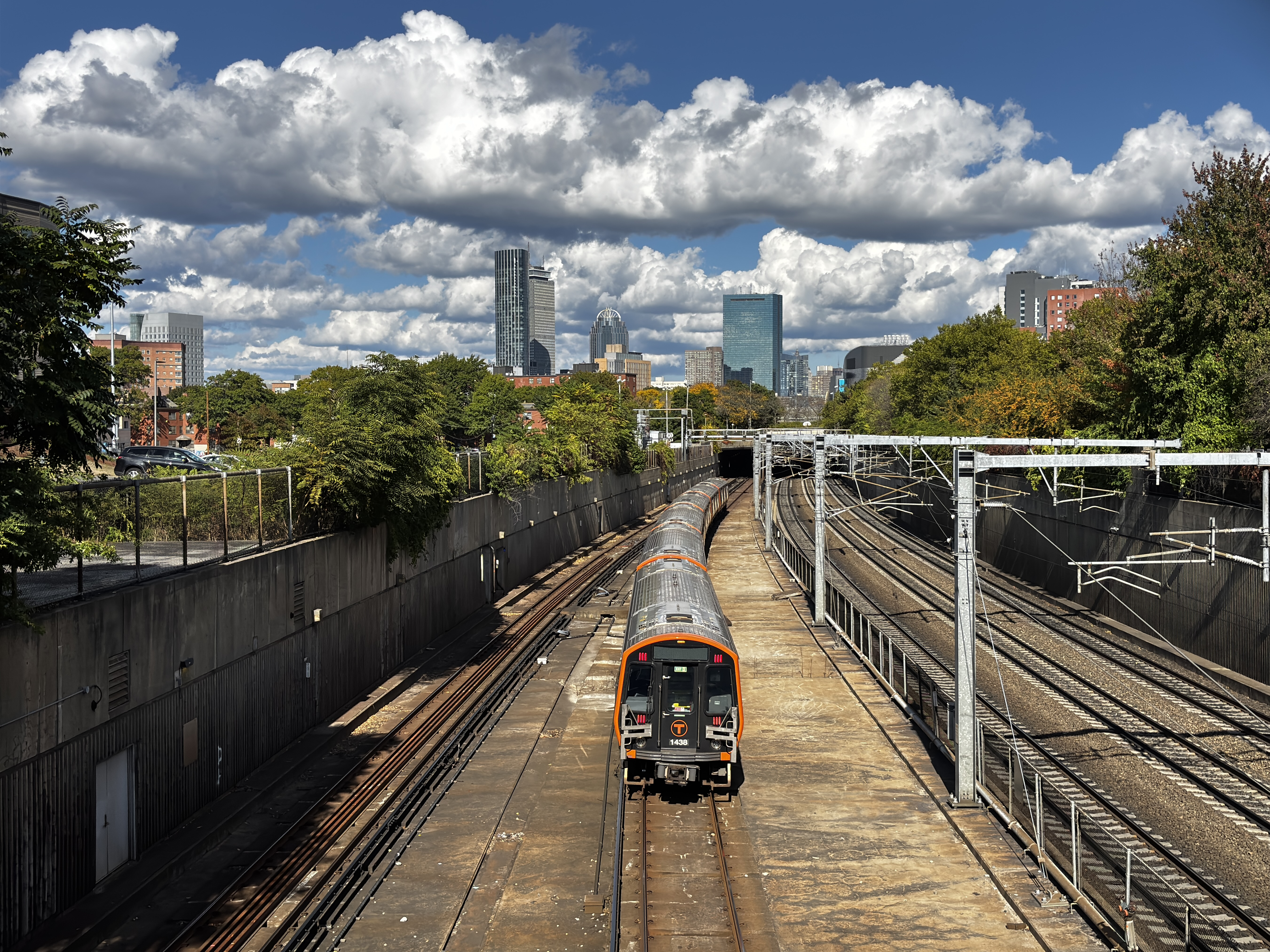
The right-of-way of the cancelled Southwest Corridor in Boston was reused for rail services, including the MBTA Orange Line

The 1948 plan for Boston's inner suburbs included eight limited-access highways: the Central Artery and the East Boston, Western, Northern, Northeast, Northwest, Southeast, and Southwest Expressways.

Over time, several of the planned highways were constructed:

- East Boston Expressway (MA 1A), 1948–1951
- Central Artery, 1951–59
- Southeast Expressway (I-93), 1954–59
- Western Expressway (Massachusetts Turnpike) 1955–59, Boston Extension 1962–65
- Northern Expressway (I-93), 1956–73

In 1970, Governor Francis W. Sargent ordered the Boston Transportation Planning Review, a review of all freeway plans within the Route 128 beltway around Boston. As a result, several freeways were canceled under his administration in 1971 and 1972:

- The Southwest Expressway (Interstate 95) to Canton was replaced by the MBTA Orange Line, which itself was relocated from an elevated railroad route over Washington Street in the Roxbury neighborhood. I-95 was rerouted to follow Route 128 around Boston.
- The Northeast Expressway (also I-95) to Peabody was largely eliminated. The southernmost part that includes the Tobin Bridge, from northern Revere, southward, which was already built, is U.S. Route 1. The scrapped northern section would have bisected the Lynn Woods Reservation and the Rumney Marsh Reservation.
- The Inner Belt (Interstate 695 and 95) around Boston was eliminated. A short section (which would have been the I-95 part of the Inner Belt) was built as a city street in Somerville.
- The 1965 plan for the Northwest Expressway would have connected the Inner Belt in Cambridge with the current U.S. Route 3 interchange at Route 128 in Burlington. The new highway from Route 128 would have connected with the existing Concord Turnpike near the Lexington-Arlington border, which would carry both Route 2 through Arlington to Alewife. A second stretch of new highway would run from Alewife through Porter Square to a connection with the Inner Belt in Union Square, Somerville. After Sargeant's moratorium, Routes 2 and 3 were left on their previous routings, with Route 2 becoming a surface road inbound of Alewife and Route 3 a surface road inside Route 128 (both roughly following the Charles River into downtown Boston). In place of the highway project, the MBTA Red Line was extended from Harvard to Alewife. (A 1948 plan used a different path for Route 3.)

The Northern Expressway was granted an exemption because it was nearly complete. Its final 3-mile (4.8 km) segment was completed in 1973 with a section from East Somerville to the North Station area of downtown Boston.

The Central Artery had cut a swath through Downtown Boston neighborhoods, creating one of the greatest eyesores in urban America during the 1950s. Because of this, it would earn its nickname "The Other Green Monster", both a play on its greenish color and on the name of the tall left field wall in Fenway Park. Through public initiative starting in 1991, the Central Artery was rerouted into a replacement tunnel network, and the elevated highway was demolished and replaced by linear parks and new buildings, in a massive project known as the "Big Dig".

There was also a plan in Western Massachusetts of an upgrade of U.S. Route 7 from Lee to Pittsfield and points north of there. The highway was to have a 60-foot (18 m) median. There was also plans of a spur off to Dalton of Massachusetts Route 9. Local opposition led to the demise of the Route 7 Freeway.

== Michigan ==
=== Detroit ===
In the 1970s, after significant protest about the Chrysler Freeway (I-75) destroying the Black Bottom neighborhood, Mayor Coleman Young used the issue as political capital by decreeing the cancellation all freeway projects in Detroit. City Council soon followed his wishes. This included three interconnected major projects, the final ten miles of Interstate 96 along Grand River Avenue from the Jeffries to the Northwest corner of the city, the already in progress conversion of Mound Road to the M-53 freeway from Detroit City Airport to the Van Dyke Expressway, and a planned extension of the Davison Freeway on both ends which was to be a connector with both Interstate 96 and the Jeffries Freeway on its west to the Mound freeway conversion on its east.

Ignoring the initial protests, a huge freeway-to-freeway interchange was constructed for the Davison extension at Exit 186 of the Jeffries, and a massive stacked freeway-to-freeway interchange was also constructed on Exit 22 of I-696 at Mound Road. Both of these interchanges see much less traffic than they were designed for.

With the cancellation of the Grand River freeway conversion, I-96 was rerouted west of its interchange with Grand River at Exit 185, paralleling the CSX rail line along Fullerton Avenue before turning northward at Exit 182 to overtake Schoolcraft Avenue. I-96 continues westward as an extension of the Jeffries Freeway through Redford and Livonia with Schoolcraft serving as a service drive until I-96 connects with I-275.

The cancellation also scrubbed plans to connect the Mound Road freeway which had already cleared the land to the existing M-53, Van Dyke Expressway, although further development of Macomb County has revived speculation on at least this portion of highway. The land impact would be minimized along the Mound Road corridor, as Mound was constructed as a multilane divided highway with a particularly wide median, suggesting that MDOT planned for this stretch to be upgraded to a full freeway at some point in the future.

=== Oakland County ===
In the 1970s, Interstate 275 was planned to bypass Detroit and Pontiac, connecting with its parent route, Interstate 75, near the city of Monroe at the southern end, and Clarkston at the northern end. I-275 was slightly realigned when it was determined that it would be more feasible to align Interstate 96 along Schoolcraft Avenue instead of the more heavily developed Grand River Avenue as originally planned, and part of I-275 would now carry I-96.

As construction progressed on the massive ramps that would connect I-275 to the existing interchange of I-96 and the western terminus of I-696, fierce opposition rose up from residents within several Oakland County communities, including Commerce Township, through where much of I-275 would have run. Environmental concerns were cited, as well as fears of dropping property values. As a result, the construction of I-275 north of I-96/I-696 was canceled. A stub from the former eastern leg of I-96, redesignated part of M-102, to what would have been northbound I-275, was left behind, as was a ramp that ran parallel to the westbound I-96 ramp that would've carried northbound I-275 and connected with the ramp from M-102.

The stubs, as well as previously unbuilt bridges and ramps, were opened in 1994 as a freeway extension was built up to 12 Mile Road. This extension was designated as M-5. Between 1994 and 2002, M-5 was extended further northward along the right-of-way that had been reserved for I-275, but as a grade-level expressway with traffic lights at 13 Mile, 14 Mile, and Maple Roads, and a grade-level railroad crossing between Maple Road and M-5's northern terminus at Pontiac Trail. Local residents continue to resist further expansion, even as Commerce Township slowly succumbs to urban sprawl.

In addition to the resistance against I-275, a planned extension from Northwestern Highway to I-275 was shelved in the 1970s as part of the same revolt. Although talks of reviving the Northwestern Extension continued for decades, development of the land along the proposed extension's right-of-way, including a strip mall right at Northwestern's current terminus, has effectively ended any chance of such a freeway being constructed.

== Minnesota ==
There were once plans for a northern bypass route of downtown Minneapolis; this bypass was to be signed as Interstate 335. Grading for I-335's connections to I-35W and I-94, as well as land acquisition and demolition for the road's right-of-way, had already begun when local residents protested I-335's proposed path through their communities. Stub ramps on I-35W, some of which are now part of the Johnson Street interchange, remain as clues to where I-335 would have begun; more stub ramps can also be found on I-94 at the North 3rd Street interchange.

== New Jersey ==
As planned in the 1960s, the Somerset Freeway, which would have connected Interstate 95 from Trenton to Interstate 287 near Metuchen, would have cut through some wealthy established properties around Princeton. In addition, the New Jersey Turnpike Authority, whose roadway runs from the Delaware Memorial Bridge to New York City, feared that the paralleling toll-free highway could take away traffic (and revenue) south of the I-287 interchange. In 1982, an act of Congress allowed the Somerset Freeway to be dropped, but stipulated that I-95 would be rerouted, via the Pennsylvania Turnpike into New Jersey. This I-95/PA Turnpike interchange, was constructed starting in 2013, and opened in 2018. When completed, the new interchange made I-95 a continuous route between Miami, Florida, and Houlton, Maine.

A similar plan involving Interstate 78 would have bisected the town of Phillipsburg, but NJDOT and PennDOT, under opposition from local residents, decided to reroute I-78 south of the Lehigh Valley area. This led to the downgrade of I-378 in Bethlehem, Pennsylvania from an Interstate highway to a PA State highway route. The completion of I-78 through the Watchung Reservation in Union County was also delayed until the early 1980s due to litigation opposing its route through the park. Several wildlife crossings designed to allow wildlife to travel safely between the severed parts of the Watchung Reservation were built as part of the highway's construction.

== New York ==
=== New York City ===
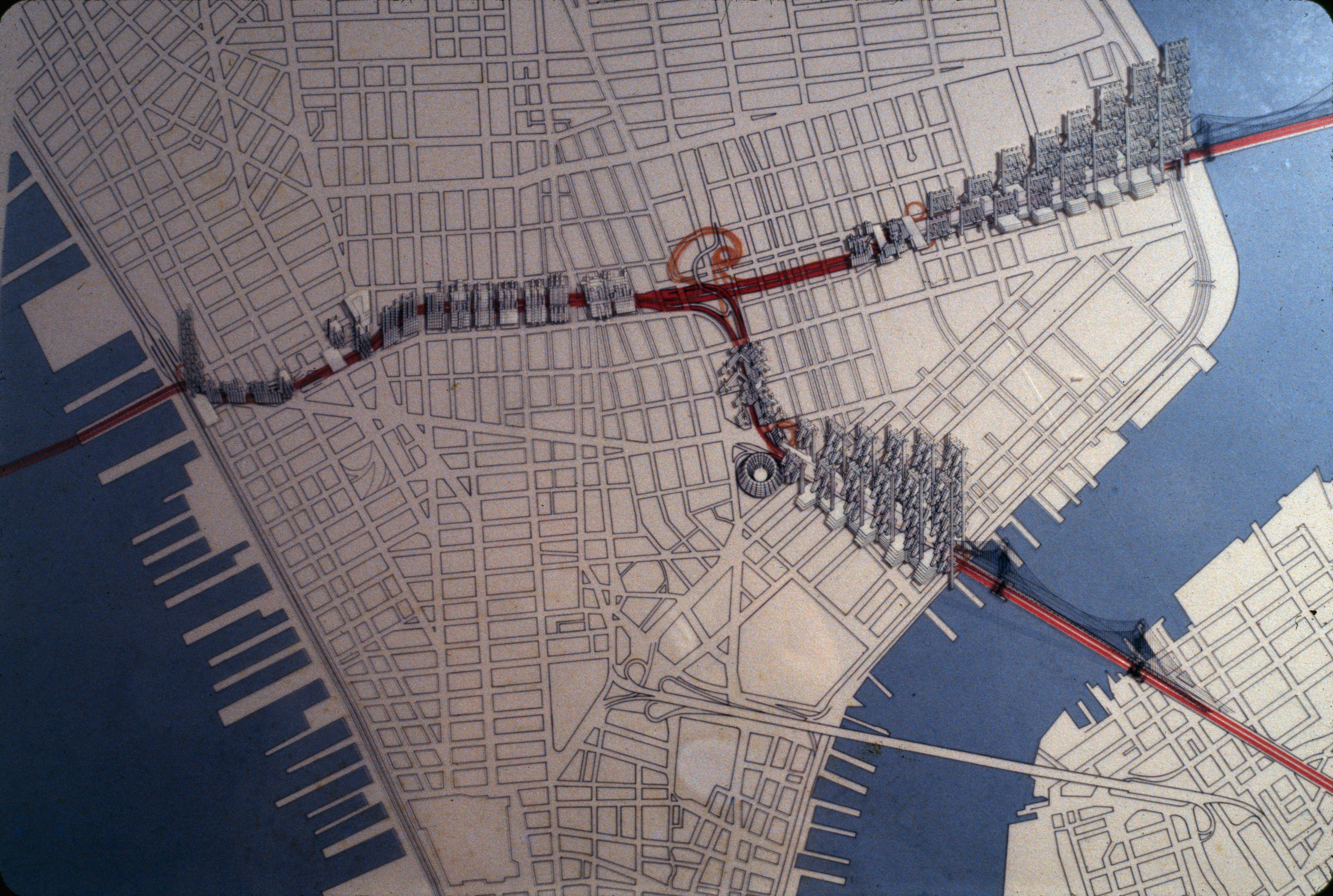
Architect Paul Rudolph's rendering of the proposed Lower Manhattan Expressway

Several expressways in New York City, mostly planned by Robert Moses, were canceled because of public oppositions, including two that would have been built through Midtown and Lower Manhattan. The Lower Manhattan Expressway was planned to carry Interstate 78 from its current terminus at the end of the Holland Tunnel through Lower Manhattan to the Williamsburg Bridge with a connection to the Manhattan Bridge at Canal Street. The Expressway would have been built directly through such neighborhoods as Greenwich Village, SoHo, and the Lower East Side, much of which was characterized as old and "run down" by the mid-20th century. After a long battle, the expressway was canceled in the 1970s by New York Governor Nelson Rockefeller due to prospects of increased pollution and negative effects on such cultural neighborhoods as Little Italy and Chinatown.

The Mid-Manhattan Expressway was planned to run directly through the busy Midtown Manhattan business district just south of 34th Street, and would pass very close to the Empire State Building. The Expressway was to carry Interstate 495 from the Lincoln Tunnel (where I-495 was to continue to the New Jersey Turnpike) to the Queens Midtown Tunnel where it would connect to the Long Island Expressway. The expressway was originally very popular among local leaders, and Moses had gone so far as to run the Expressway right through Manhattan skyscrapers. However, fears of increased vehicular traffic in the already congested city brought cancellation in 1971. This led to the downgrade of New Jersey's portion of I-495 from an Interstate highway, down to a New Jersey state route in the 1980s.

Expressways in the boroughs outside Manhattan had been planned but later canceled, including the Bushwick Expressway, an extension of Interstate 78 through Brooklyn and Queens that would run from the Williamsburg Bridge (at the end of the Lower Manhattan Expressway) to John F. Kennedy International Airport. Also, the Cross Brooklyn Expressway, a faster commercial route paralleling the Belt Parkway from the Verrazzano–Narrows Bridge to John F. Kennedy International Airport, was canceled. The Bushwick was canceled largely due to the cancellation of the Lower Manhattan Expressway. For this reason, none of I-78's spur routes connect to I-78; the closest connection would have been made by Interstate 478 via the Brooklyn-Battery Tunnel.

Other expressway cancellations included the Queens-Interboro Expressway, which would have connected the Queens Midtown Tunnel with southern neighborhoods of Brooklyn and Queens; and the Cross Harlem Expressway, which would have run in the vicinity of 125th Street in Harlem from the Triborough Bridge to the Hudson River (plans also included building a bridge at 125th Street to New Jersey over the Hudson).

In Queens, the Clearview Expressway abruptly ends in the neighborhood of Hollis. It was slated to continue south to John F. Kennedy International Airport, but was canceled. The proposed segment near JFK Airport was built as the JFK Expressway between 1989 and 1992. In The Bronx, the Sheridan Expressway was to run from the Bruckner Expressway in the South Bronx to the Westchester County Line where it would meet with the New England Thruway. However, this extension was canceled and today the Sheridan Expressway runs a very short route from the Bruckner Expressway to the Cross Bronx Expressway. In Staten Island, the Richmond Parkway was left unfinished north of Arthur Kill Road due to community and environmentalist pressures because it would have cut-through and thus destroyed the Staten Island Greenbelt which is one of the largest natural areas in the New York City parks system. For many of the same reasons, the Willowbrook Parkway which would have shared an interchange with the Richmond Parkway was also left unbuilt south of Victory Boulevard. Also in Staten Island, the construction of much of the Shore Front Drive was stopped for good when the city handed over Great Kills Park, which contained a long stretch of the parkway's right-of-way, to the National Park Service.

Local groups protested the construction of these expressways through their neighborhoods. Completed expressways such as the Cross Bronx Expressway, which is largely credited for the destruction and dereliction of the Tremont neighborhood, and the Brooklyn-Queens Expressway, stirred resentment and opposition to further construction.

=== Long Island ===
New York City was not the only part of New York to face an onslaught of freeway revolts. Long Island had dozens of roads planned by the New York State Department of Transportation, as well as Suffolk and Nassau Counties, although not all the roads were intended to be freeways (see List of Suffolk County (New York) Road proposals). On two occasions, Suffolk County built roads and allowed them to be redesignated as state highways, in the hope that the state would upgrade them when the county couldn't. The following is a list of roads throughout New York State that were either canceled, truncated, or stalled.

- A.O. Smith Turnpike.
- Atlantic Expressway-Sunrise Highway.
- Babylon-Northport Expressway.
- Bethpage State and Caumsett State Parkways.
- Broad Hollow Expressway.
- Cross River Drive Extension.
- Cedar Swamp Road.
- Freeport-Roslyn Expressway.
- Long Island Expressway Extension.
- Long Lane.
- MacArthur Airport Expressway.
- Nassau Expressway.
- Nicolls Road (completed, but intended to be upgraded to a limited-access highway for its full length)
- Northern State Parkway Extension.
- Nesconset-Port Jefferson Highway-North Shore Expressway.
- Ocean Parkway Extension.
- Patchogue-Mount Sinai Road Extension and Cedar Beach Spur.
- Ponquogue Causeway.
- Port Jefferson-Westhampton Beach Highway.
- Seaford-Oyster Bay Expressway.
- Sound Shore Parkway.
- Southern State Parkway Extension.
- Veterans Memorial Highway Extension.
- Wantagh State Parkway Extension.
- West Babylon-Centerport Highway.
- Western Nassau Expressway.
- William Floyd Parkway.

=== Hudson Valley ===
- Bear Mountain Parkway is interrupted by a gap between Cortlandt and Yorktown.
- Blue Mountain Parkway
- Briarcliff–Peekskill Parkway
- Catskill Expressway
- Central Corridor Expressway (included the Bronx-White Plains and White Plains-Mahopac Expressways)
- Cross County Parkway Extensions
- Garden State Parkway Extension
- Hudson River Expressway
- New Jersey Turnpike—Northern Extension
- Northern Westchester Expressway
- Orange Expressway
- Ossining-South Salem Expressway
- Pearl River-Haverstraw Expressway
- Peekskill-Brewster Expressway
- Pelham-Port Chester Parkway
- Phelps Way
- Pound Ridge-Stamford Expressway
- Spring Valley Bypass
- A major 4-lane straightening and expansion of the Hutchinson River Parkway in Eastchester through a park was put on indefinite hold after outcry from local residents in 1978 and 1979.
- The Taconic State Parkway was rerouted further away from what is now Lake Taghkanic State Park in 1946 when owners of the vacation cottages that would have been condemned along the lake's west shore objected. Construction of the highway was held up for two years while a new route was acquired and planned

=== Capital District ===
- Mid-Crosstown Arterial (US 9-9W)-An expressway following Henry Johnson Boulevard and Lark Street to Interstate 787 and the New York State Thruway.
- Northern Albany Expressway-A highway connection from Interstate 90 to Interstate 87 through Colonie.
- Southern Albany Expressway-A free connection between the Adirondack Northway and the Riverfront Route running parallel to the New York State Thruway.
- Taconic State Parkway Extension-The parkway would've continued into Rensselaer County and Washington County and ended in Saratoga Springs
- South Mall Arterial-An expressway from the Mid-Crosstown Arterial to Interstate 787 in Downtown Albany. Would've begun under Washington Park.
- South Mall Expressway-A highway from Albany to Defreestville through Rensselaer. Would've connected to present day New York State Route 43.
- Slingerlands Bypass
- Interstate 88 Extension or Interstate 92 (also known as the East–West Highway)-A highway through Northern New England from Albany or Glens Falls to Calais, Maine or Portsmouth, New Hampshire.

=== Buffalo-Niagara Falls ===
Buffalo-Niagara Falls was also not immune to freeway revolts. An extensive system of highways and parkways were planned to be built in the counties of Niagara and Erie.

- Lake Ontario State Parkway Extension
- Robert Moses State Parkway Extension
- LaSalle Expressway This expressway was to be the beginning of the proposed Buffalo Belt Expressway, which was never built except for the LaSalle and the short Milestrip Expressway (New York State Route 179) in Blasdell, New York.
- Interstate 990 was originally to extend all the way to Lockport, New York and eventually to Rochester, New York; instead, it terminates at New York State Route 263. Also, the expressway was planned to cross the east side of Buffalo, in a portion to be called the Crosstown Expressway; it would have terminated at the Niagara section Interstate 190 near the northern sections of South Buffalo.
- New York State Route 5 (Southshore Expressway) expressway section to New York State Route 75.
- New York State Route 33 (Kensington Expressway) extension to the Outer Beltway.
- West Side Arterial to Interstate 190 in Downtown Buffalo – the existing Niagara Street exit ramps (Exit 8) from Interstate 190 are several blocks long because they were originally planned to be part of the West Side Arterial, which would have run along Virginia Street and along the north side of downtown to connect to Route 33.
- New York State Route 400 Extension from New York State Route 16 To Erie County Line and possibly to Olean, New York.
- Gowanda Expressway Angola, New York to Gowanda, New York.
- North Park Expressway From Interstate 190 to New York State Route 33 in North Buffalo.
- East Side Arterial New York State Route 33 to Interstate 90 New York State Thruway.
- Lancaster Expressway Interstate 90 to US Route 20.
- River Road Expressway Buffalo Beltway in Niagara Falls to South Grand Island Bridges.
- Tonawanda Expressway (Today's Twin Cities Memorial Highway New York State Route 425) Creating a freeway instead of an arterial from Interstate 290 to the Buffalo Beltway.
- Tuscarora Expressway An outer Beltway for the City of Niagara Falls from Tonawanda Expressway to Robert Moses State Parkway.
- Inner Belt Parkway
- Outer Belt Parkway

=== Other regions ===
- Watertown-Champlain Expressway
- New York State Route 13 Expressway, Ithaca
- East–West Highway (New England) along US 4
- Extension of Interstate 390 Genesee Expressway into Downtown Rochester

== Ohio ==
Map of Interstate Highways in Greater Cleveland, with cancelled routes in pink

=== Cleveland ===
Cuyahoga County, Ohio proposed three freeways that would bisect Cleveland's eastern suburbs and parkland including Cleveland Heights, Shaker Heights and East Cleveland. The Clark Freeway was to connect I-271 with downtown Cleveland via Shaker Boulevard, the Shaker Lakes, North Park Boulevard and East Cleveland. The Lee Freeway was to run north from an interchange with the Clark Freeway at Shaker Lakes over Lee Road to the Heights Freeway that would have run east–west approximately where Monticello Blvd and Taylor roads are. Local residents blocked all three highways. One of several key actions was the 1966 formation of the Nature Center at Shaker Lakes.

=== Cincinnati ===
Cincinnati also had a freeway revolt: the Colerain, Queen City and Taft Expressways were never built (though a particularly congested segment of Queen City Avenue was eventually bypassed in 2005) and the Red Bank Expressway, designed as a freeway connection between Interstate 71 and U.S. Route 50, was built instead as a surface artery, albeit with limited intersections. There are prominent ramp stubs at the interchange of Interstate 74 and Beekman Street that would have connected I-74 to the Colerain Expressway.

In addition, the Cross County Highway, which was designed to connect the eastern and western sides of I-275 through Hamilton County, was built, but never fully completed. For years, the highway existed in two separate segments; the eastern segment was built between Galbraith Road and Montgomery Road (just east of I-71) in the late 1950s and early 1960s. In the mid-1970s, the western stretch was built from Colerain Avenue (U.S. Route 27) to the western side of I-275. While these segments were finally connected in 1997, and the highway was renamed the Ronald Reagan Highway, the three-mile (5 km) stretch between Montgomery Road and the eastern side of I-275 was never built due to protests from wealthy residents of The Village of Indian Hill, who convinced officials to stop the highway's construction from occurring in the city. This resulted in the lack of a direct freeway connection between existing Interstate 74 and its proposed extension along Ohio State Route 32 to the east toward the Carolinas.

== Oklahoma ==
=== Tulsa ===
In the 1960s, the Riverside Expressway was planned to be built in Tulsa along Riverside Drive and a former railroad right-of-way. The route would have started at the Inner Dispersal Loop (I-444) and continued south along present-day Riverside Drive. Activists led by Betsy Horowitz started campaigning against the planned expressway in 1968. Much of the opposition came from the Maple Ridge neighborhood, where part of the route would have passed. The Riverside Expressway was cancelled in 1972, following a federal lawsuit that blocked funding needed for its construction. Its cancellation also made possible the creation of Tulsa's River Parks system.

== Oregon ==
=== Portland ===
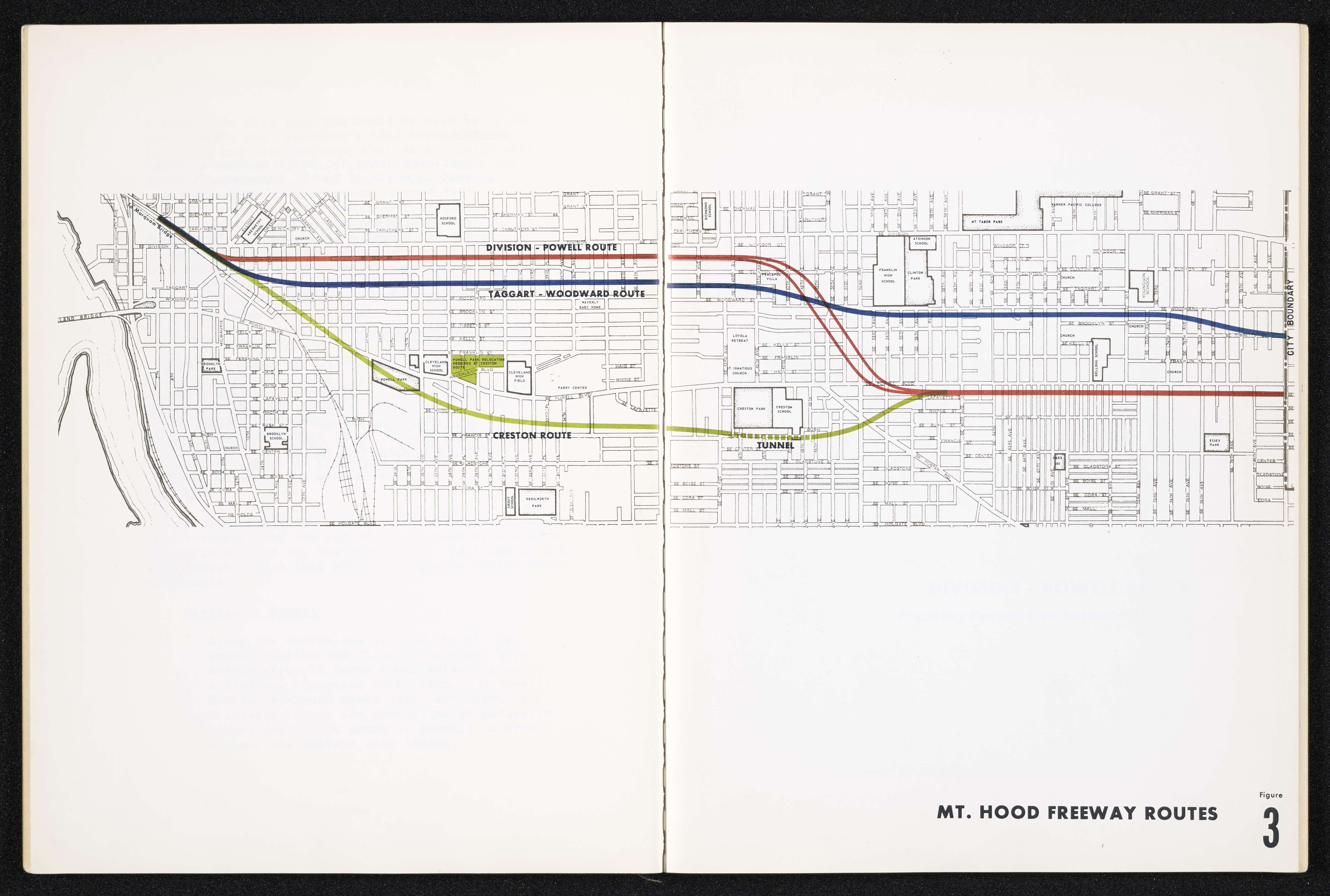
Map of the proposed Mount Hood Freeway in Portland

Shortly after World War II, the city leaders of Portland, Oregon commissioned famed transportation planner Robert Moses to design a freeway network for the city. Moses produced a proposal which called for numerous freeways to crisscross the city; of this proposal six freeway routes made it to the planning stage. Four of the six were eventually constructed (in some cases in the face of intense opposition); these are:

- The Banfield Freeway (Interstate 84)
- The Baldock Freeway (Interstate 5)
- The Stadium Freeway (Interstate 405)
- The East Portland Freeway (Interstate 205)

However, two other planned freeways—the Interstate 505 freeway, and the Mount Hood Freeway, were far more controversial. Each proposed route cut through established city neighborhoods. An intense battle arose over the Mount Hood Freeway, a proposed routing of U.S. Route 26 and Interstate 84 (then 80N) that stretched from the Marquam Bridge out to the city of Sandy at the base of Mount Hood. One section of the freeway—an expressway stretch between Sandy and Gresham with an uncompleted interchange—was built; but the remainder was controversial.

The 1972 mayoral race, with Neil Goldschmidt representing the anti-freeway side and Frank Ivancie representing the supporters of the freeway, became a de facto referendum on the proposed route. The election was won by Goldschmidt and the freeway was canceled. The proposed federal funds for the project were instead made available for a planned light rail line, built in the 1980s to connect Portland with Gresham and now part of the MAX Blue Line. This light-rail network is steadily expanding, including sections along Interstate 205 in room that resulted from the controversy.

Soon after, the Interstate 505 proposal was also canceled; a shorter freeway "stub" was built instead, and U.S. Route 30 was routed on a new alignment through an industrial area (and away from the residential neighborhood that its prior alignment—and the I-505 proposal—ran through). A stub ramp is all that remains of the unbuilt proposed section of the interstate.

In addition to the cancellation of three proposed freeway routes, Portland saw another milestone in the freeway revolts: the destruction of an already-existing freeway. The first freeway to be built through the city—Harbor Drive (along the western shore of the Willamette River), which was, at the time, the route of Oregon Route 99W—was closed in May 1974, demolished and replaced with Tom McCall Waterfront Park, which opened in 1978. 99W was moved onto nearby Front Avenue (the stretch of 99W through Portland would be later decommissioned), and little evidence remains that there was once a freeway along the waterfront. The removal of Harbor Drive was not very controversial; the construction of I-5 on the river's East Bank, and I-405 through the downtown core, had made Harbor Drive unnecessary.

=== Elsewhere in Oregon ===
Other Oregon freeway revolts occurred in Salem and Eugene. In Salem, the Interstate 305 project was shelved and replaced with the Salem Parkway, a highway along the same alignment but with at-grade intersections. In Eugene, the Roosevelt Freeway and West Eugene Parkway projects were canceled, and the Belt Line Road was severely curtailed; only the northwestern segment of the proposed beltway was ever built.

== Pennsylvania ==
=== Philadelphia ===
There were plans for the Cobbs Creek Expressway, which would have started at Interstate 95 and run up the western edge of Philadelphia, along with the Crosstown Expressway, which would have connected back to I-95 near downtown. Both freeways were part of a planned routing of Interstate 695. Because of community opposition, neither freeway was constructed. (Additionally, the position of the Crosstown Expressway portion of I-695 between the Schuylkill and Vine Street Expressways would be considered redundant, particularly because of its close proximity to the Vine Street Expressway.) Several non-interstate freeways inside Philadelphia were also cancelled, including the Pulaski Expressway (PA 90) which would have connected the Betsy Ross Bridge and I-95 with Roosevelt Boulevard, along with the Roosevelt Expressway Extension (an upgrade of Roosevelt Boulevard from Old York Road to Adams Avenue) and the Northeast Expressway (a new alignment for US 1 from Adams Avenue to Street Road in Bensalem). Outside the city, an Interstate 895 was planned to connect the Philadelphia suburbs of Bristol, Pennsylvania and Burlington, New Jersey.

A portion of Interstate 476 in Delaware County, locally known as the "Blue Route", originally began construction in 1967, but faced significant opposition and environmental concerns from residents throughout the county. As a result, the road was built in portions in the 1970s which sat disconnected for nearly 20 years until the entire expressway was finally completed through the county in 1991. Although the highway was completed, an agreement was made in 1985 that the highway would be required to only have four lanes south of the interchange with PA 3, as opposed to the rest of the highway having six lanes. The Philadelphia Inquirer described the Blue Route as "the most costly, most bitterly opposed highway in Pennsylvania history".

Multiple sections of Pennsylvania Route 23 were once planned for an expressway upgrade, including portions in King of Prussia, Phoenixville, and Lancaster County, but none were ever ultimately completed. At the segment in Lancaster County, expressway construction began, but lack of funding at the state level halted construction of further segments. The grading and several overpasses for the expressway still exist, but as a mostly unpaved section that has since gained popularity as the "Goat Path Expressway", as local farmers were permitted to use the right-of-way for agricultural purposes.

=== Pittsburgh ===
A freeway revolt also occurred in Pittsburgh, where stub ramps near the Birmingham Bridge exist from the cancellation of the unbuilt Oakland Crosstown Freeway. Other canceled freeways include the South Hills Expressway, Pittsburgh–McKeesport Expressway, and the East Liberty Expressway.

== Tennessee ==
Interstate 40 in Tennessee was planned to go through Memphis's Overton Park but public opposition, combined with a United States Supreme Court victory by opponents, forced abandonment. The eastern portion of the road had already been built inside the Interstate 240 loop and this non-interstate highway is now named Sam Cooper Boulevard while the northern portion of the I-240 loop was redesignated as I-40.

== Texas ==
The Trans-Texas Corridor plan was cancelled due to widespread opposition from environmental groups, fiscal conservatives, and property rights activists. The 4,000-mile network of supercorridors, were envisioned to be 1,200 feet in width and accommodate separate carriageways for automobiles and trucks; rail lines, and utility conduits. Opposition to the Trans-Texas Corridor plan was so strong that then-Governor Rick Perry and other high-level state officials were threatened with impeachment had they given final approval to move forward with construction.

=== Dallas ===
The Trinity Parkway was a proposed six-lane toll road originally planned to run from the State Highway 183/Interstate 35E interchange to the U.S. Highway 175/Interstate 45. The Dallas City Council voted 14-1 in 2007 to support a parkway inside the eastern levee of the Trinity River. Dallas City Council had recommended that a "context-sensitive design" be used for the parkway.

The project, however, came under increased scrutiny from both the media and local figures in the City of Dallas. At issue was the project's financing, where $1.2 billion of the project's $1.5 billion in funding needed had yet to be identified. Critics had also pointed out that it appeared that the toll road would only provide marginal improvements to congestion in the area by increasing average speeds by two miles per hour. In March 2015, Dallas City Council Member Scott Griggs lambasted the project in a public meeting, calling it "the worst boondoggle imaginable" and claiming it would "cripple economic development". Another key figure in the highway revolt was former City Council member Angela hunt, the youngest woman to ever serve on the City Council at the time, who led the unsuccessful initiative to bring the fate of the Trinity Parkway to a referendum.

On August 9, 2017, the Dallas City Council officially voted 13-2 to pull support for the Trinity Parkway, effectively canceling the project.

=== Houston ===
The inner city segment of Texas State Highway 225 was originally planned to begin in downtown Houston and traverse the city's predominantly Hispanic east side as the Harrisburg Freeway, but was never built due to neighborhood opposition and environmental concerns. Ghost ramps are still visible today at the west end of the freeway's planned route at Loop 610, while they were once visible on the I-69/US 59 elevated downtown, prior to reconstruction in the late 1990s.

=== San Antonio ===
Around 1964, a freeway was proposed for the section of Texas State Highway 16 inside Loop 410. The initial proposal for the so-called "Bandera Expressway" would have routed the freeway parallel to and just west of Bandera Road, continuing south to the Guadalupe Street corridor, where it would have turned east and crossed Interstate 10/Interstate 35 and Interstate 37 along the southern edge of downtown San Antonio before ending at Commerce Street east of I-37. The plan also included a long-planned bypass route for I-10 running north-south about one mile west of the overloaded I-10/I-35 section downtown. After pushback from local officials protesting the routing of both freeways through the proposed Model Cities Program area, which they feared would be jeopardized by the freeway plans, the routing for the Bandera Expressway (which was also sometimes referred to as the "Hill Country Expressway") was changed in 1971 to run from I-10 at Culebra Avenue west along Culebra to Loop 410. However, this plan would also have resulted in a large number of homes and businesses being destroyed in the heavily Latino West Side, and protests from the community and elected officials eventually killed the plans for both freeways.

== Vermont ==
=== Burlington ===
The Burlington Beltline was a planned highway envisioned in the 1960s to be built around the Burlington metropolis with the freeway cutting through the waterfront for access to the core business district. The only part of this built to federal specifications was Interstate 189, a short two mile spur. Various parts of the Beltline have been built piecemeal as both divided and undivided two lane freeways.

=== Central and Northeastern ===
Another conceived freeway (proposed to be designated as either I-92 or I-98 in different versions of the plan) that has been continually protested is a proposal by the state of Maine and business interests in Maine and Vermont for a freeway extending from Montpelier at I-89, crossing to St. Johnsbury, meeting up with I-93, then splitting right after crossing into New Hampshire. The freeway would cut straight across northern New Hampshire into Maine, where it would cut down to Maine's coastal cities. The freeway has been called a critical link for loggers in Maine to reach Western markets in the U.S. and Canada.

== Virginia ==
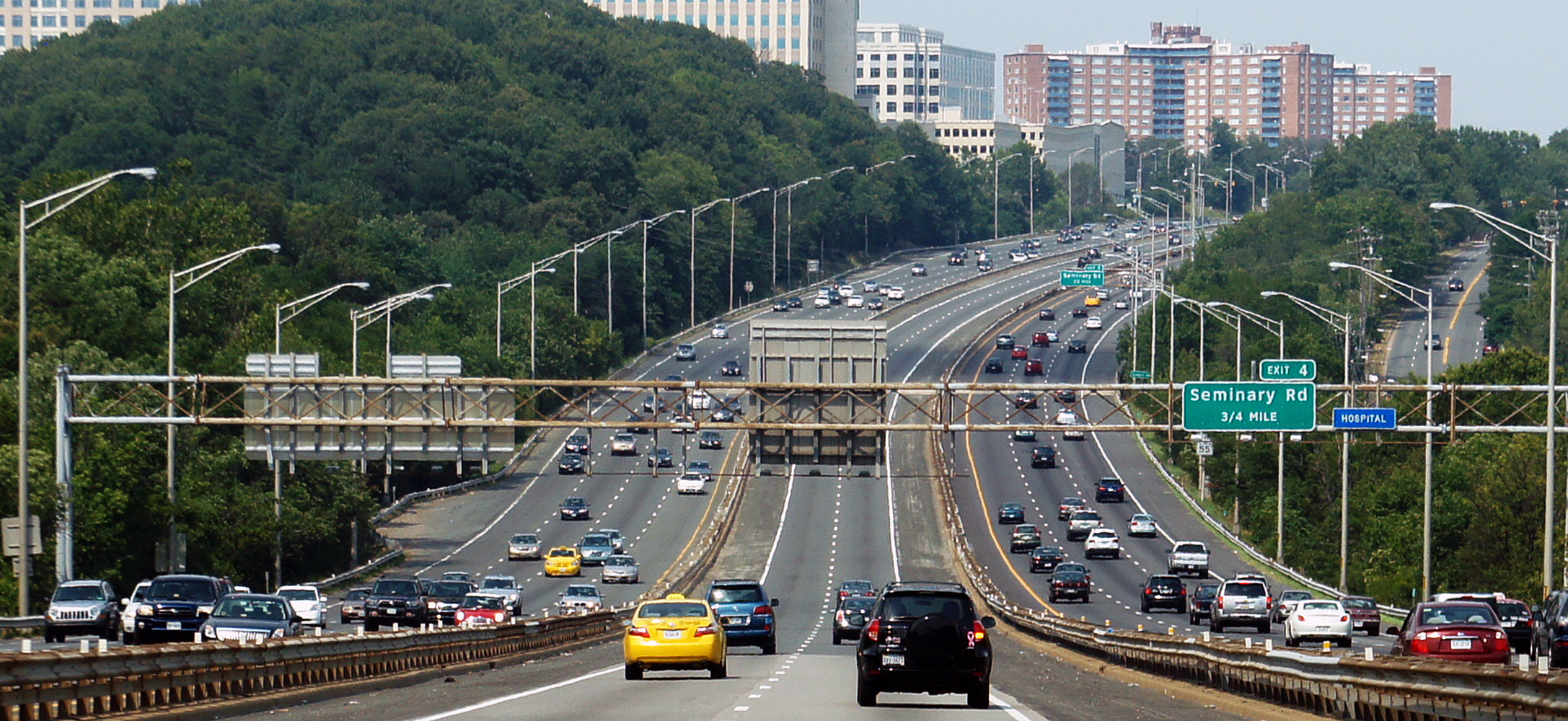
Existing I-95/395 two-lane barrier-separated reversible HOV facility located in Northern Virginia. The segment shown in the photo was proposed for conversion to HO/T operation as three lanes, but was dropped from the final project. The facility has since been converted to HO/T Lanes in 2019.

Construction of I-66 inside the Washington Beltway was blocked by environmental litigation until a compromise was reached that limited it to a four-lane limited access highway that is HOV only during rush hours.

Construction of a third reversible lane to be operated as HOT for a half day in the direction of rush hour traffic on Interstate 395 was blocked by Arlington County, Virginia and Alexandria, Virginia through successful environmental litigation. As a result, the 95 Express Lanes end at the Alexandria border.

== Washington ==
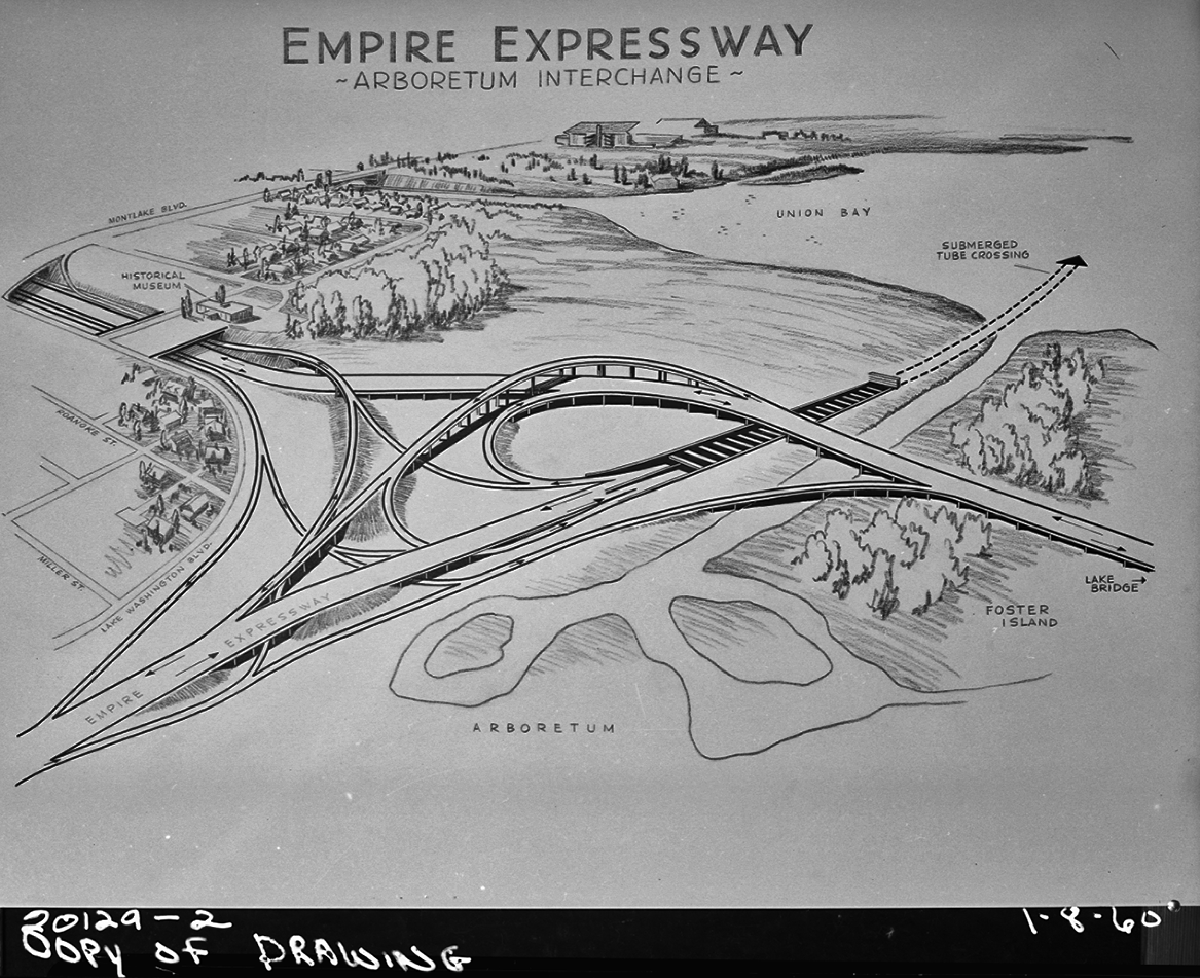
Proposal for a freeway interchange within the Washington Park Arboretum, cancelled in 1972

The R.H. Thomson Expressway, connecting Interstate 90 to State Route 520 through the Central District, Madison Valley, and Washington Park Arboretum, and the Bay Freeway, connecting Interstate 5 to State Route 99 in South Lake Union near Seattle Center, faced mounting protests beginning in 1969. The death of these two highways is generally considered to be the 1972 referendum that withdrew their funding.

In the 1960s, the state legislature proposed Interstate 605 as a second bypass of Seattle. Similar proposals were made in 2000 and 2003. While the routings have varied, public opposition has shut down each of the projects. Additional freeways in the Seattle metropolitan area were proposed in transportation plans from the 1960s, but were not developed further.

After the Alaskan Way Viaduct in Seattle was damaged by an earthquake in 2001, there was a significant political movement to not replace it, including large majorities voting against both replacement options, but the Washington State Department of Transportation voted to allocate funding to build a tunnel to replace the viaduct. A large number of citizens, including Seattle mayor Mike McGinn, vowed to stop this tunnel, but were unsuccessful. The replacement State Route 99 tunnel ultimately opened in 2019.

In 1964, the Spokane Metropolitan Area Transportation Study was formed to fulfill requirements of Federal Highway Act of 1962, and in 1970, along with the Department of Highways, released the "Corridor Study for North Spokane and North Suburban Area Freeway". It recommended a north–south freeway along Hamilton and Nevada streets (the corridor between Nevada and Helena). Though a full freeway interchange connecting Hamilton Street with I-90 was built, residents successfully blocked any further construction through this area. The remaining section of the freeway stub is now Washington State Route 290. The North-South Freeway (now known as the North Spokane Corridor) was reawakened in 1997 when a new corridor was chosen, and is currently under construction.{{

== Washington, D.C. ==
Plans to build Interstate 270, Interstate 95, Interstate 295 and Interstate 66, as well as a proposed Interstate 266 over a new Three Sisters Bridge through Washington, D.C., and the Maryland and Virginia suburbs were canceled in 1977 due to public opposition. This is why Interstate 395 (the originally planned I-95 Center Leg Freeway) ends at New York Avenue and Interstate 95 goes around the Capital Beltway rather than continuing through the city. Funds for several of these projects were redirected to the construction of the Washington Metro.

== Wisconsin ==
In Milwaukee, several planned freeways were either never built, partially built, or partially built but subsequently demolished and replaced with an at-grade boulevard.

- The Lake Freeway was designed to be the eastern leg of an inner loop around downtown Milwaukee, to extend along the lakefront south from the Park Freeway to Bay View and southeastern Milwaukee and thence through the southeastern suburbs, with a proposed extension to run much further south, through central Racine and Kenosha, Wisconsin, continuing further south through Chicago's northeastern lakefront suburbs, where a portion of the proposed freeway was constructed, and is today the Interstate-standard section of Lake Shore Drive. Besides Lake Shore Drive in Chicago, along with the never-completed Amstutz Expressway through Waukegan, the only portion of this system that is completed to Interstate standards is a 2-mile (3.2 km) portion of Interstate 794, although a portion of the route south of the official southern terminus of Interstate 794 continues as 4-lane divided controlled-access freeway, as Highway 794, or the Lake Parkway.
- The northern end of the Lake Freeway turned westward, and this section became known as the Park Freeway. This was the northern leg of the inner loop. The eastern section was known as the Park East Freeway and the western section as the Park West Freeway, with the dividing point at the intersection with I-43. The Park West Freeway was intended to run northwesterly along Fond du Lac Avenue, and then turn westward just north of North Avenue. A major intersection with the Stadium Freeway was planned for the area around 45th and North Avenue. The right-of-way for the entire corridor was cleared. Due to neighborhood opposition, the only section of this freeway completed was from Milwaukee Street to Walnut Street. The above-grade section between Milwaukee Street and 6th Street was removed and replaced by an at-grade boulevard – McKinley Boulevard. After several years, it has begun to be developed with the opening of the new Fiserv Forum arena and several facilities for the Milwaukee School of Engineering.
- The Stadium Freeway was partially completed. The original plan was for its south end to be at I-894/I-43 near Loomis Road. From that point it would extend northward, intersecting I-94 at the Stadium Interchange and proceeding northward to its intersection with the Park Freeway. From there it would jog northwesterly until heading north, parallelling 60th Street and continuing north to Port Washington, where it met with I-43. The only section built was that between National Avenue and Lisbon Avenue, today's Wisconsin Highway 175, along with an overbuilt interchange south of Port Washington converted to a surface road interchange.
- Another planned freeway was the Bay Freeway. This was to be the northern bypass around the central city, complementing I-894 which is the built southern bypass. The Bay Freeway eastern point was I-43 at Hampton Avenue. The freeway was to run over Hampton Avenue, westward to the intersection with the Stadium Freeway and the Fond du Lac Freeway. From there it continued westward to Pewaukee where it would meet with Wisconsin Highway 16. No section of the Bay Freeway was ever built.
- The Belt Freeway was to be a freeway encircling the metro Milwaukee area on the south, west and north sides. No section of the Belt Freeway was ever built.
