= Belt Expressway =

The Belt Expressway was a proposed freeway in Western New York in the United States. It would have begun south of the city of Buffalo in the village of Blasdell and headed north and west to the Rainbow Bridge in the city of Niagara Falls.

Although most of the road was never built, two portions of the loop were constructed near its proposed endpoints:

- The Milestrip Expressway in Blasdell, part of New York State Route 179
- The LaSalle Expressway in Niagara Falls
