= New York State Route 179 =

State highway in Erie County, New York, US

New York State Route 179
- Map of the Buffalo area with NY 179 highlighted in red

Route information
- Maintained by NYSDOT
- Length: 4.40 mi (7.08 km)
- Existed: mid-1960s–present

Major junctions
- West end: NY 5 in Hamburg
- US 62 in Blasdell; I-90 / New York Thruway in Hamburg; US 219 in Orchard Park
- East end: US 20 / CR 460 in Orchard Park

Location
- Country: United States
- State: New York
- Counties: Erie

Highway system
- New York Highways; Interstate; US; State; Reference; Parkways
← NY 178	→ NY 180

New York State Route 179 (NY 179) is a short 4.40-mile (7.08 km) long state highway located south of Buffalo in Erie County, New York, in the United States. It is known as Milestrip Road for most of its length. A small section between U.S. Route 62 (US 62) and NY 5 in Blasdell, is a freeway known as the Mile Strip Expressway. It connects to two major freeways, the New York State Thruway (Interstate 90 or I-90) and the Southern Expressway (US 219), by way of interchanges. It serves as a connector road between them and three other major routes, NY 5, US 62, and US 20. Thus it is very busy not only at rush hours, but also after Buffalo Bills' home football games due to its proximity to Highmark Stadium.

The Mile Strip Expressway was first constructed in the 1960s from NY 5 in Hamburg to US 62 in Blasdell. By 1968, it received its NY 179 designation. This was extended to the Thruway in the next decade and by 2001, was extended to its current eastern terminus at US 20 in Orchard Park. Although never constructed as such, the Mile Strip was intended to be a portion of the Belt Expressway, an outer loop for the city of Buffalo.

== Route description ==
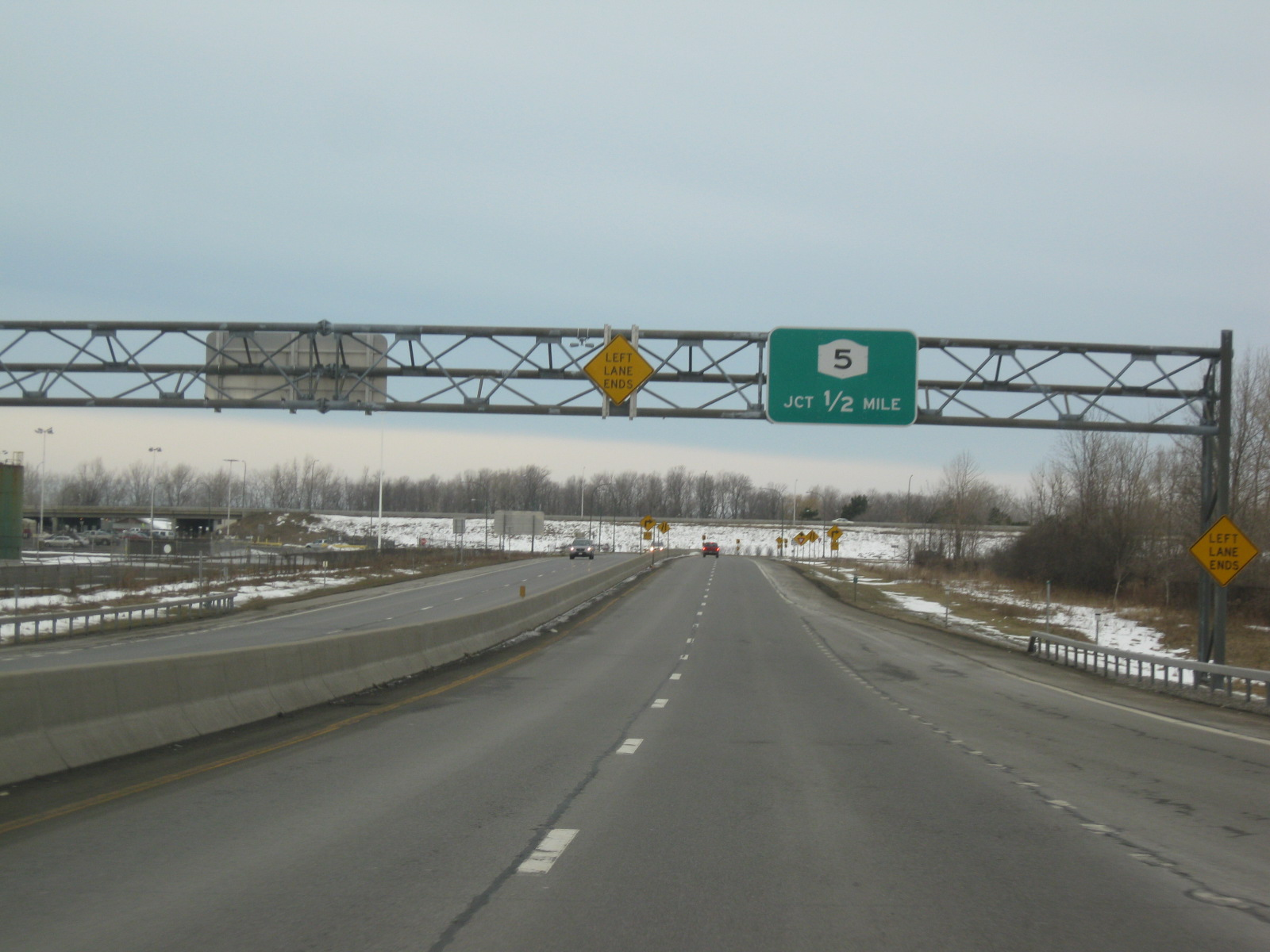
NY 179 westbound approaching an interchange with NY 5 in Hamburg

NY 179 begins at an interchange with NY 5 (Lake Shore Road) near the shores Lake Erie in Woodlawn Beach State Park. NY 179 proceeds eastward through the town of Hamburg as the Mile Strip Expressway, running north as a four-lane freeway north of a stamping plant, operated by the Ford Motor Company. Just after the stamping plant, NY 179 enters its first interchange, Milestrip Road, which connects to NY 179 east via a jughandle. Crossing into the town of Blasdell, the freeway crosses over three separate railroad grades consecutively before crossing into downtown Blasdell. In Blasdell, another railroad crosses the freeway after an interchange with Jeffrey Boulevard. A short distance later, NY 179 intersects with US 62 (South Park Avenue), where the freeway ends and NY 179 becomes the four-lane surface road known as Milestrip Road.

After re-crossing into Hamburg, NY 179 continues eastward as Milestrip Road, entering a large interchange with the New York State Thruway (I-90 exit 56), which connects via trumpet interchange. After bending northeast, the route crosses over the Thruway, passing north and south of several strip malls until an intersection with CR 204 (McKinley Parkway). After CR 204, NY 179 passes north of McKinley Mall, proceeding eastward as a four-lane undivided expressway past several residences before bending northeast, intersecting with CR 4 (Abbott Road) in the town of Orchard Park.

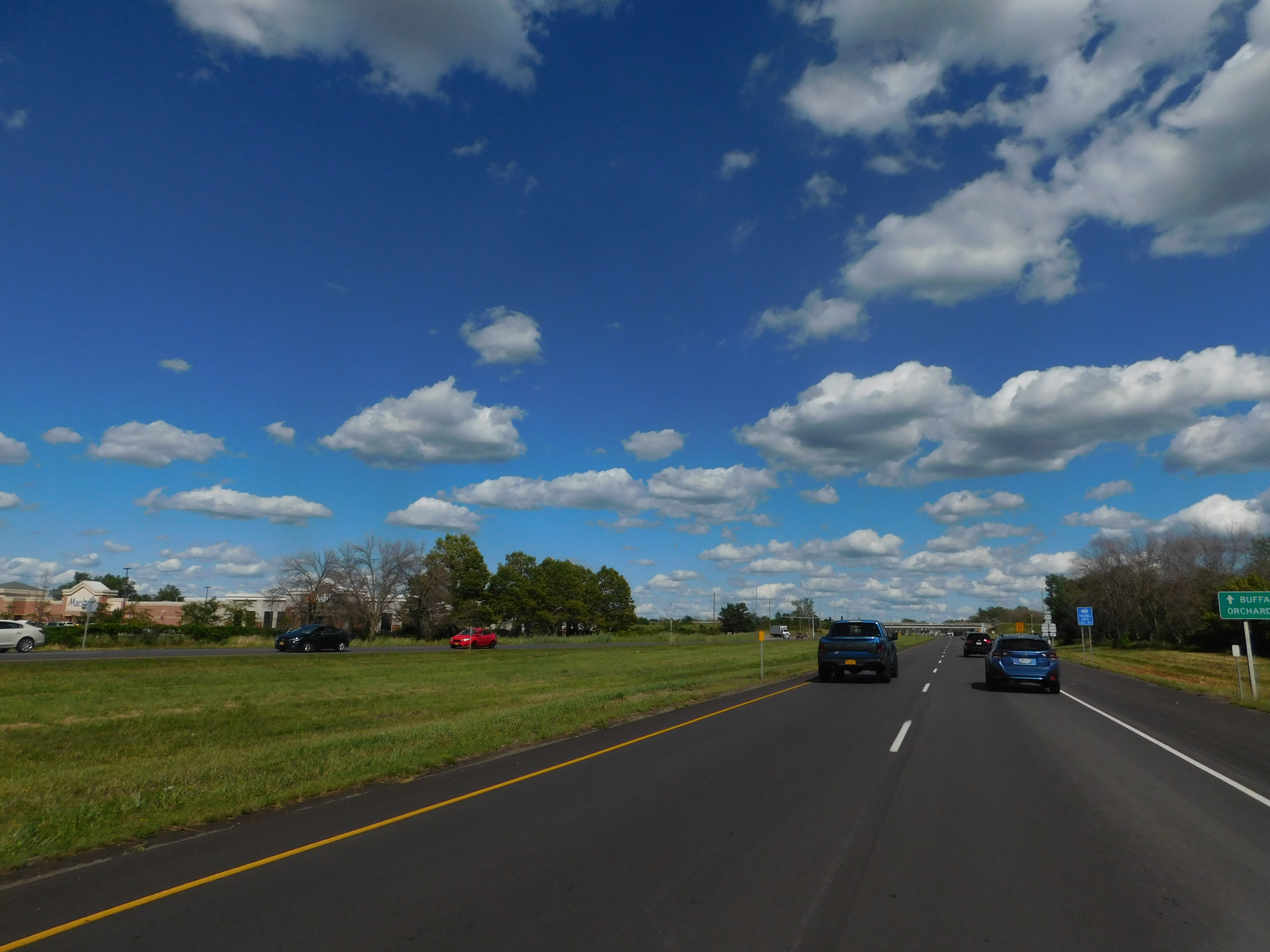
NY 179 eastbound approaching US 219 in Orchard Park

After CR 4, NY 179 proceeds east through Orchard Park intersecting the northern terminus of CR 461 (California Road). After crossing under another railroad, NY 179 passes south of several strip malls in Orchard Park. The route soon becomes a four-lane divided expressway, entering a cloverleaf interchange with US 219 (the Southern Expressway). After the interchange, NY 179 proceeds eastward between several strip malls, soon intersecting with US 20 (Southwestern Boulevard), where NY 179 terminates. CR 460 continues eastward along Milestrip Road to NY 187.

== History ==
The Mile Strip Expressway, a 1-mile (1.6 km) highway extending from NY 5 to US 62, was constructed in the mid-1960s and designated as NY 179 by 1968. A short continuation of the expressway east of US 62 providing direct access to New York State Thruway exit 56 was opened to traffic as an extension of NY 179 at some point in the late 1970s or early 1980s. The junction between the expressway and Milestrip Road was initially a four-way intersection, with Milestrip Road passing east–west through the intersection and NY 179 entering from the south to connect to Thruway exit 56 to the north.

The entirety of Milestrip Road east of US 62 was initially maintained by Erie County as CR 460. The intersection between NY 179 and US 62 was originally planned as an overpass, but was later constructed as an at-grade intersection. By 2001, the junction between NY 179, Milestrip Road, and the Thruway was reconfigured into its current design and NY 179 was extended east to its current terminus at US 20. CR 460 was then truncated to US 20 on its western end, transferring maintenance of Milestrip Road from the Thruway to US 20 to the New York State Department of Transportation.

The Mile Strip Expressway was to be part of the Belt Expressway, an outer loop connecting Buffalo and Niagara Falls. This plan was ultimately cancelled. The only two portions of the loop that were constructed are the LaSalle Expressway east of Niagara Falls and the mile-long Mile Strip Expressway.

== Major intersections ==
The entire route is in Erie County.

Location	mi	km	Destinations	Notes
Town of Hamburg	0.00	0.00	NY 5 (Lake Shore Road) – Buffalo Outer Harbor	Western terminus
Blasdell			Milestrip Road	
Blasdell			Martin Avenue	
Blasdell	1.14	1.83	Eastern end of freeway section	
Blasdell	1.14	1.83	US 62 (South Park Avenue) – Blasdell	
Town of Hamburg	1.33	2.14	I-90 / New York Thruway – Buffalo, Erie	Exit 56 on I-90 / Thruway
Town of Hamburg			Western end of limited-access section	
Town of Orchard Park	3.68	5.92	US 219 (Southern Expressway) – Orchard Park, Buffalo	Cloverleaf interchange
Town of Orchard Park	4.40	7.08	US 20 (Southwestern Boulevard) / CR 460 east (Milestrip Road)	Eastern terminus; at-grade intersection
1.000 mi = 1.609 km; 1.000 km = 0.621 mi
