= Blasdell, New York =

- Village
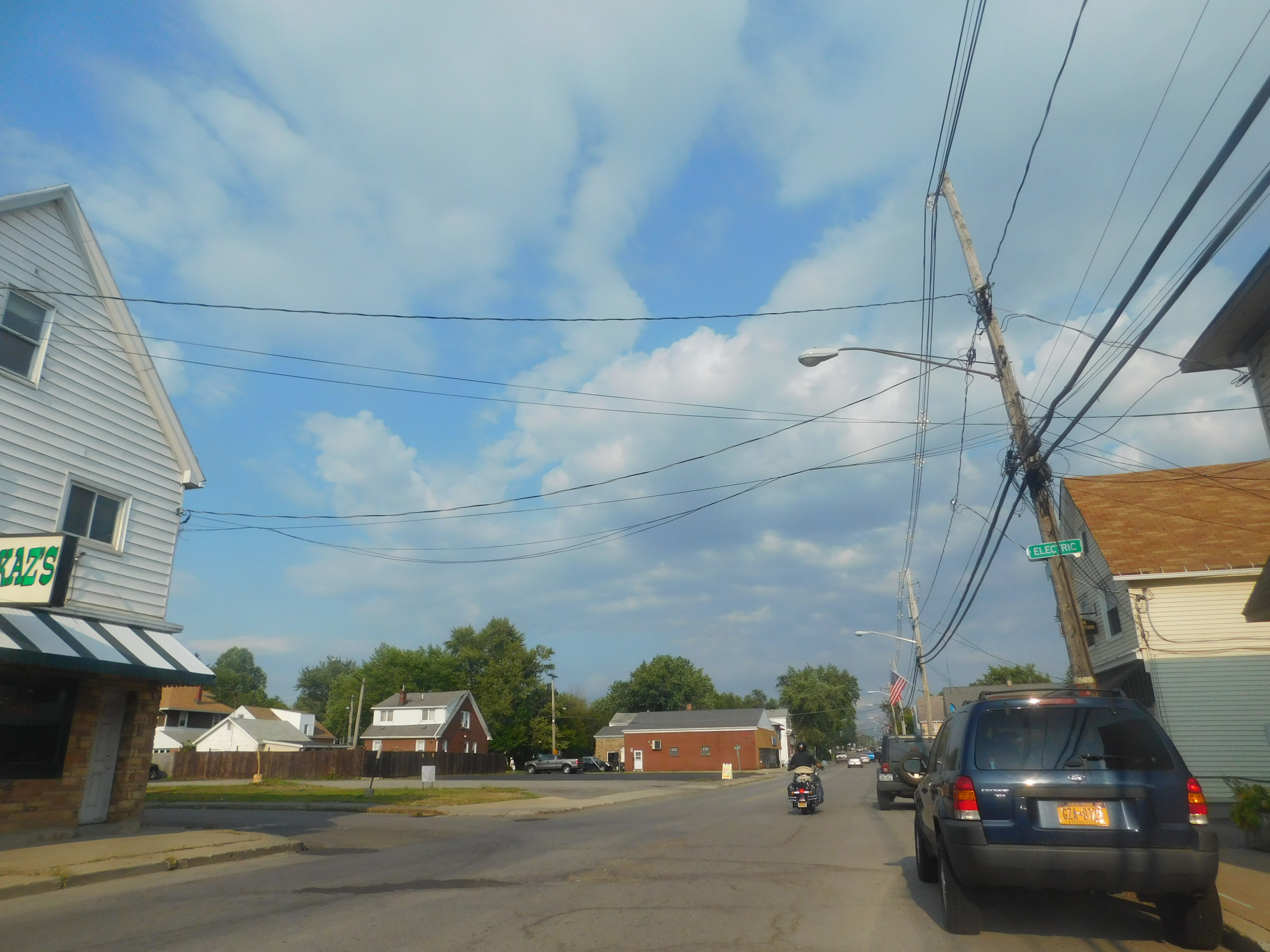
- Lake Avenue in Blasdell in 2017

- Seal
- Nickname: "The Gateway to the Southtowns"
- Location in Erie County and the state of New York

- Location within the state of New York
- Coordinates: 42°47′42″N 78°49′41″W
- Country: United States
- State: New York
- County: Erie
- Town: Hamburg

Government
  - Type: Mayor-Council
  - Mayor: Robert Hefner Jr. (C)

Area
  - Total: 1.12 sq mi (2.91 km^{2})
  - Land: 1.12 sq mi (2.91 km^{2})
  - Water: 0 sq mi (0.00 km^{2})
- Elevation: 610 ft (186 m)

Population (2020)
  - Total: 2,539
  - Density: 2,259.7/sq mi (872.47/km^{2})
- Time zone: UTC-5 (Eastern (EST))
  - Summer (DST): UTC-4 (EDT)
- ZIP code: 14219
- Area codes: 716, 624
- FIPS code: 36-06849
- GNIS feature ID: 0944230
- Website: villageofblasdell.gov

Blasdell is a village in Erie County, New York, United States. The population was 2,539 at the time of the 2020 census. It is part of the Buffalo-Niagara Falls metropolitan area.

The village is located within the northern part of the town of Hamburg and is bordered to the north by the city of Lackawanna – itself located directly south of Buffalo. The village calls itself the "Gateway to the Southtowns" of Erie County.

== History ==
The community grew as a railroad town around the Erie Railroad. Blasdell was incorporated in 1898 as a village.

Wrestler Ilio DiPaolo was a longtime resident, before his death in 1995. In 1965 he opened an Italian restaurant on South Park Avenue. It is now run by his family.

Blasdell is one of two municipalities in Erie County to have a registered Conservative as its executive, the other being Newstead.

The name is derived from Herman Blasdell, the first station master of the Erie and Pennsylvania railroad depot.

== Geography ==
According to the United States Census Bureau, the village has a total area of 1.1 square miles (2.8 km^{2}), all land.

=== Adjacent cities and towns ===
- City of Lackawanna - north
- Town of Hamburg - south, east, west

== Demographics ==
Historical population
Census	Pop.	Note	%±
1900	415		—
1910	849		104.6%
1920	1,401		65.0%
1930	2,015		43.8%
1940	2,322		15.2%
1950	3,127		34.7%
1960	3,909		25.0%
1970	3,910		0.0%
1980	3,288		−15.9%
1990	2,900		−11.8%
2000	2,718		−6.3%
2010	2,553		−6.1%
2020	2,539		−0.5%
U.S. Decennial Census

=== 2020 census ===
As of the 2020 census, Blasdell had a population of 2,539. The median age was 39.4 years. 19.9% of residents were under the age of 18 and 15.9% of residents were 65 years of age or older. For every 100 females there were 93.1 males, and for every 100 females age 18 and over there were 90.0 males age 18 and over.

100.0% of residents lived in urban areas, while 0.0% lived in rural areas.

There were 1,178 households in Blasdell, of which 26.1% had children under the age of 18 living in them. Of all households, 28.1% were married-couple households, 27.9% were households with a male householder and no spouse or partner present, and 34.2% were households with a female householder and no spouse or partner present. About 41.4% of all households were made up of individuals and 14.9% had someone living alone who was 65 years of age or older.

There were 1,285 housing units, of which 8.3% were vacant. The homeowner vacancy rate was 1.9% and the rental vacancy rate was 3.8%.

Racial composition as of the 2020 census
Race	Number	Percent
White	2,258	88.9%
Black or African American	57	2.2%
American Indian and Alaska Native	12	0.5%
Asian	24	0.9%
Native Hawaiian and Other Pacific Islander	1	0.0%
Some other race	35	1.4%
Two or more races	152	6.0%
Hispanic or Latino (of any race)	139	5.5%

=== 2000 census ===
As of the census of 2000, there were 2,718 people, 1,201 households, and 684 families residing in the village. The population density was 2,361.9 inhabitants per square mile (911.9/km^{2}). There were 1,282 housing units at an average density of 1,114.1 per square mile (430.2/km^{2}). The racial makeup of the village was

- 96.80% White,
- 0.22% African American,
- 0.37% Native American,
- 0.07% Asian,
- 1.51% from other races, and 1.03% from two or more races.
- Hispanic or Latino of any race were 3.46% of the population.

There were 1,201 households, out of which 26.3% had children under the age of 18 living with them, 39.6% were married couples living together, 12.5% had a female householder with no husband present, and 43.0% were non-families. 37.6% of all households were made up of individuals, and 15.6% had someone living alone who was 65 years of age or older. The average household size was 2.26 and the average family size was 3.04.

In the village, the population was spread out, with 24.6% under the age of 18, 6.7% from 18 to 24, 31.5% from 25 to 44, 20.0% from 45 to 64, and 17.2% who were 65 years of age or older. The median age was 36 years. For every 100 females, there were 89.5 males. For every 100 females age 18 and over, there were 87.0 males.

The median income for a household in the village was $35,613, and the median income for a family was $43,846. Males had a median income of $37,500 versus $22,917 for females. The per capita income for the village was $17,925. About 6.7% of families and 6.4% of the population were below the poverty line, including 5.0% of those under age 18 and 6.4% of those age 65 or over.

== Infrastructure ==
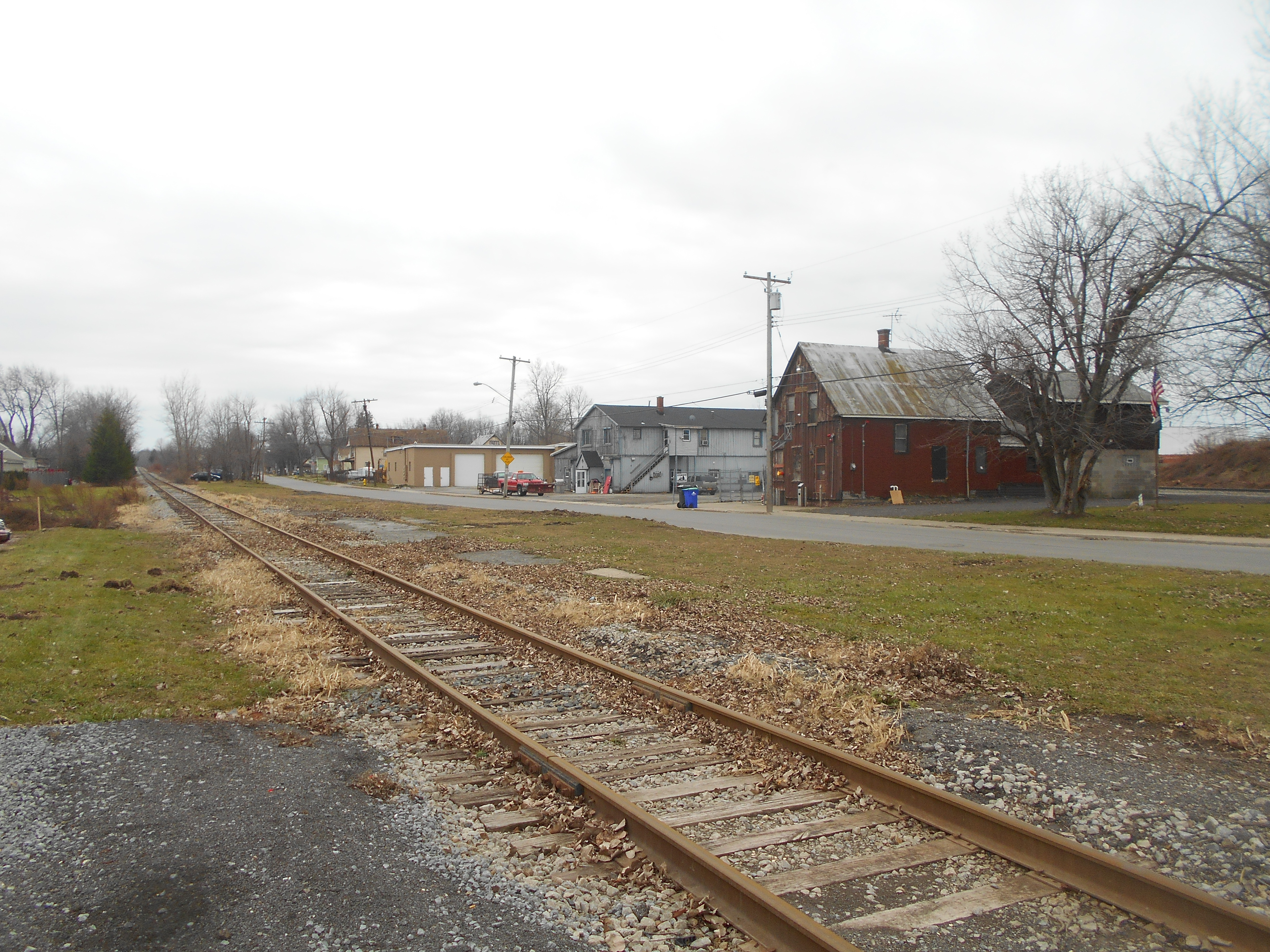
Blasdell station in December 2014

Major highways in the Village of Blasdell include:

- Interstate 90 (New York State Thruway), although it does not run through the village, the thruway lies just east of it and access to it is provided by Mile Strip Road/Expressway. (NY 179).
- U.S. Route 62 (South Park Avenue), north-south roadway that runs through the village from Hamburg in the south to Lackawanna in the north.
- New York State Route 179 (Mile Strip Expressway), east-west expressway that borders the southern village line. Important route for traffic between NY 5, US 62, the NYS Thruway and beyond.

== Notable people ==
- Ilio DiPaolo, professional wrestler
- Charles W. Goodier Sr., former mayor and decorated aviator in World War II
- Ron Wolfley, former running back for the Cardinals.

== See also ==
- List of municipalities in New York
- Hamburg (village), New York
