= Lists of former state routes =

This is a list of lists of former state routes.

- List of former state routes in Georgia (1–199)
- List of former state routes in Georgia (200–699)
- List of former state routes in Georgia (700–1109)
- List of former state routes in Nevada
- List of former state routes in New York (1–25)
- List of former state routes in New York (26–50)
- List of former state routes in New York (51–100)
- List of former state routes in New York (101–200)
- List of former state routes in New York (201–300)
- List of former state routes in New York (301–400)
- List of former state routes in New York (401–500)
- List of former state routes in Ohio (1–49)
- List of former state routes in Ohio (50–130)
- List of former state routes in Ohio (142–219)
- List of former state routes in Ohio (223–270)
- List of former state routes in Ohio (271–352)
- List of former state routes in Ohio (354–568)
- List of former state routes in Ohio (569–673)
- List of former state routes in Ohio (675–824)
- List of former state routes in Washington
