= New York State Route 182 =

State highway in Niagara County, New York, US

New York State Route 182
- Map of Niagara County in western New York with NY 182 highlighted in red

Route information
- Maintained by NYSDOT and the city of Niagara Falls
- Length: 6.18 mi (9.95 km)
- Existed: January 1, 1962–present

Major junctions
- West end: Whirlpool Rapids Bridge in Niagara Falls
- I-190 in Niagara
- East end: US 62 in Wheatfield

Location
- Country: United States
- State: New York
- Counties: Niagara

Highway system
- New York Highways; Interstate; US; State; Reference; Parkways
← NY 180	→ NY 183
← NY 18B	NY 18D	→ NY 18F

New York State Route 182 (NY 182) is a 6.18-mile (9.95 km) state highway in Niagara County, New York, in the United States. It serves as a signed connection between the Whirlpool Rapids Bridge over the Niagara River and the Niagara Falls International Airport east of the city of Niagara Falls. From the bridge, NY 182 runs across the city of Niagara Falls, following several local streets as it makes its way to an intersection with U.S. Route 62 (US 62) in Wheatfield. The route was originally designated as New York State Route 18D in the early 1930s. It gained its current designation on January 1, 1962.

== Route description ==
NY 182 begins at Whirlpool Street's intersection with the Whirlpool Rapids Bridge in the northern part of Niagara Falls near the Niagara Falls Amtrak station. From here, the route heads south on Whirlpool Street, a two-lane, at-grade road that parallels the Robert Moses State Parkway through most of the city. After two residential blocks, the route turns east onto Cleveland Avenue, leaving the vicinity of the Niagara River and entering a mixed-use area surrounding Cleveland Avenue's nearby intersection with Main Street (NY 104). Past this junction, NY 182 passes two more blocks of homes before veering northeast onto Lockport Street. The route turns again just two blocks later to proceed east on Ontario Avenue.

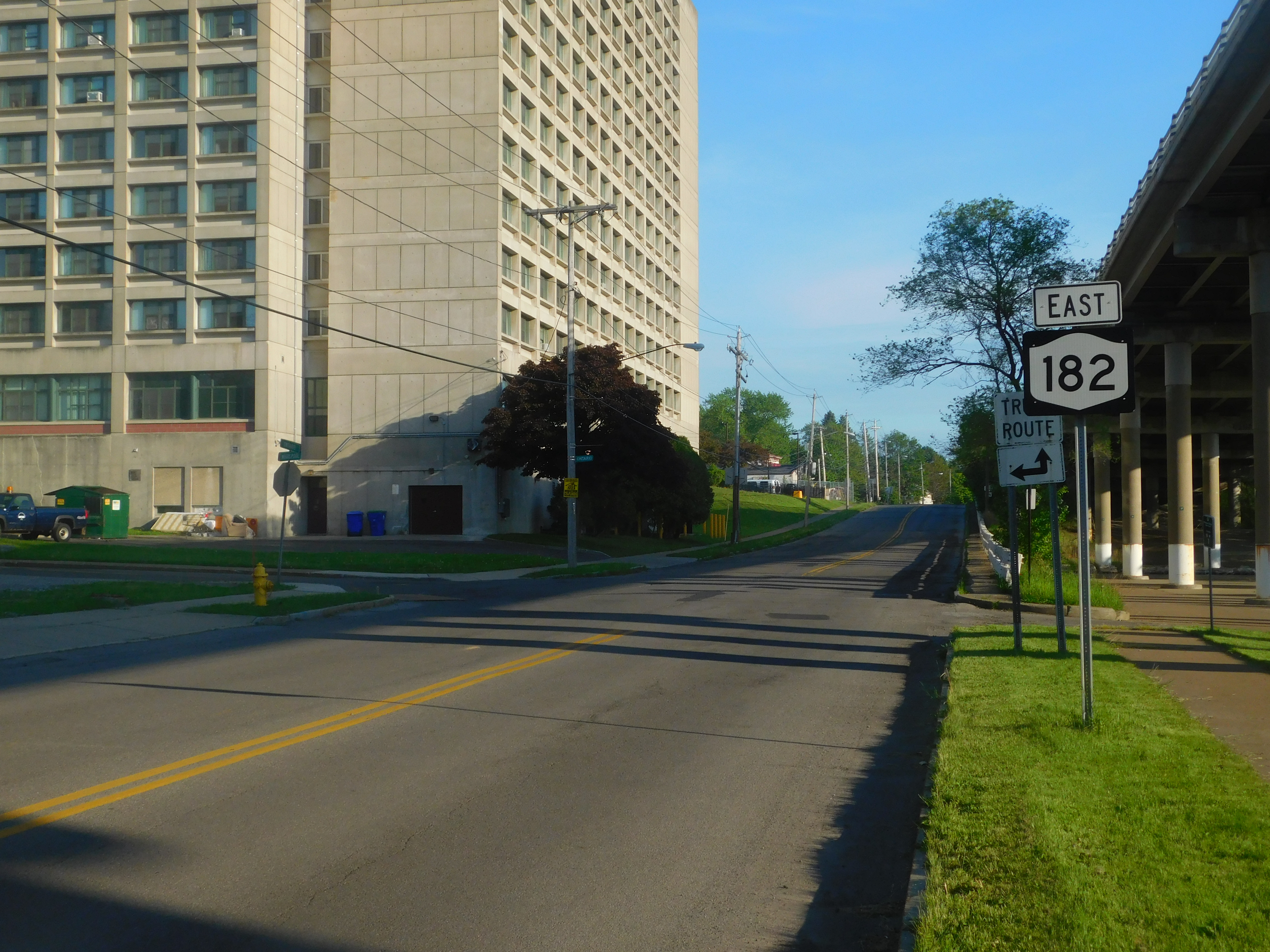
NY 182 departing the Whirlpool Rapids Bridge. The Niagara Scenic Parkway was overhead to the right

The highway passes several more residential blocks ahead of an intersection with Hyde Park Boulevard (NY 61). Here, NY 182 turns southeastward, creating a short three-block overlap between NY 61 and NY 182. The concurrency ends at Porter Road, where NY 182 splits from NY 61 and resumes an eastward track across the city. It soon passes through the center of Hyde Park before leaving Niagara Falls for the town of Niagara. Just past the city line, NY 182 enters a commercial and industrial area surrounding Interstate 190 (I-190) exit 23. Porter Road ends shortly afterward at a junction with Packard Road, leaving NY 182 to follow Packard Road as it intersects Military Road (NY 265).

East of Military Road, a second section of Porter Road branches off just east of the junction, at which point NY 182 turns southeastward to follow Porter Road once again. The road passes a handful of housing tracts before crossing Cayuga Creek and entering another commercialized area on the southern edge of Niagara Falls International Airport. The route runs along the airport's south boundary for about 1 mile (1.6 km), curving eastward as it connects to the airport terminal and slowly approaches Niagara Falls Boulevard (US 62). NY 182 ends south of the center of the airport at a junction with US 62 in the town of Wheatfield, just east of the Niagara–Wheatfield town line.

== History ==
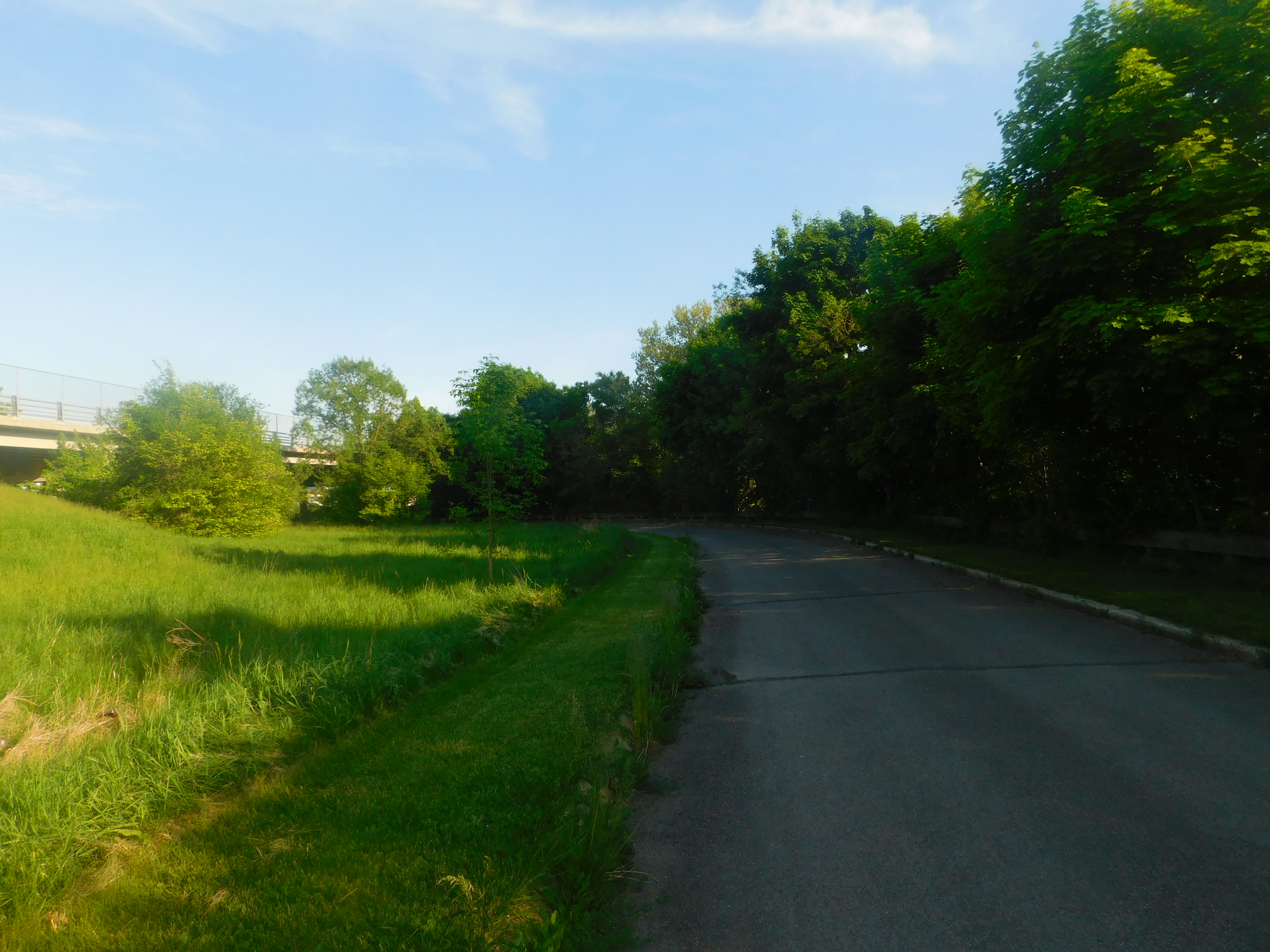
Abandoned ramps from the Niagara Scenic Parkway (the former Robert Moses State Parkway) to NY 182 in Niagara Falls

Porter Road, the east–west highway that comprises two-thirds of NY 182's length, originally went no farther east than New Road, a north–south street just inside the eastern city limits of Niagara Falls. In 1926, the New York State Department of Highways began developing plans to extend Porter Road southeast to Niagara Falls Boulevard (then-NY 34). The impetus for building the new state-maintained road was the presence of grade crossings on Lockport Road, a parallel road to the north that was the primary highway from Niagara Falls to Lockport at the time. By completing the extension, the crossings could be avoided by using Porter and Packard roads to connect to Lockport Road east of the city. The first leg of the extension, an east–west segment linking the city portion of Porter Road to Military Road in Niagara, was completed by mid-1929.

Niagara Falls International Airport, located on Niagara Falls Boulevard near the proposed east end of the Porter Road extension, was officially opened on June 13, 1929, as part of a citywide festival. Two months later, Niagara Falls City Manager W.D. Robbins indicated that the state had planned to construct the rest of the Porter Road extension in 1930, providing the city with another route to the new airport. By the following October, most of the extension was completed save for the bridge traversing Cayuga Creek. The overpass over the creek was finished by 1932, and Porter Road was designated as NY 18D c. 1932. While state maintenance of Porter Road was confined to the part outside of Niagara Falls, NY 18D continued westward through the city to the Whirlpool Rapids Bridge by way of several city-maintained streets. The designation of the route was changed to NY 182 when NY 18 was truncated to US 104 (now NY 104) in Lewiston on January 1, 1962.

== Major intersections ==
The entire route is in Niagara County.

Location	mi	km	Destinations	Notes
Niagara Falls	0.00	0.00	Whirlpool Rapids Bridge	Western terminus
Niagara Falls	0.26	0.42	NY 104 (Main Street)	
Niagara Falls	1.47	2.37	NY 61 north (Hyde Park Boulevard)	Northern terminus of NY 61 / NY 182 overlap
Niagara Falls	1.58	2.54	NY 61 south (Hyde Park Boulevard)	Southern terminus of NY 61 / NY 182 overlap
Niagara	3.50	5.63	I-190 (Niagara Expressway) / New York Thruway	Exit 23 (I-190)
Niagara	3.83	6.16	NY 265 (Military Road)	
Wheatfield	6.18	9.95	US 62 (Niagara Falls Boulevard)	Eastern terminus
1.000 mi = 1.609 km; 1.000 km = 0.621 mi: Concurrency terminus
