= New York State Route 61 (disambiguation) =

New York State Route 61 is a north–south state highway in Niagara County, New York, United States, that was established in 1958.

New York State Route 61 may also refer to:

- New York State Route 61 (1920s–1934) in Rockland County
- New York State Route 61 (1934–1940s) in Westchester County, see List of former state routes in New York (51–100)
