= New York State Route 429 =

State highway in Niagara County, New York, US

New York State Route 429
- Map of western New York with NY 429 highlighted in red

Route information
- Maintained by NYSDOT and the city of North Tonawanda
- Length: 12.16 mi (19.57 km)
- Existed: c. 1932–present
- History: Replaced NY 31A in 1935

Major junctions
- South end: NY 265 / NY 384 in North Tonawanda
- US 62 in Wheatfield
- North end: NY 104 on Lewiston–Cambria town line

Location
- Country: United States
- State: New York
- Counties: Niagara

Highway system
- New York Highways; Interstate; US; State; Reference; Parkways
← NY 428	→ NY 430

New York State Route 429 (NY 429) is a north–south state highway located entirely within Niagara County, New York, in the United States. It extends for 12.16 miles (19.57 km) from an intersection with NY 265 and NY 384 in North Tonawanda to a junction with NY 104 (Ridge Road) on the border between the towns of Cambria and Lewiston. Although it is relatively minor in length, the route is regionally important nonetheless as it connects North Tonawanda to some of the county's interior regions. About midway between North Tonawanda and Ridge Road, NY 429 serves the hamlet of Sanborn, where it briefly overlaps with NY 31. At Pekin, a community situated between Sanborn and NY 104, NY 429 descends the Niagara Escarpment.

The Sanborn–Ridge Road segment of modern NY 429 was originally designated as part of Route 30, an unsigned legislative route, in 1908. In the mid-1920s, the portion of Route 30 west of Rochester became part of the signed NY 31; however, NY 31 was realigned in the late 1920s to follow Ridge Road west from Cambria to the village of Lewiston. NY 31's former alignment from Niagara Falls to Ridge Road via Sanborn became New York State Route 31A at this time. NY 31A was eliminated in 1935 as part of the establishment of U.S. Route 104 (US 104). The portion of its former routing north of Sanborn became part of NY 429, which was extended from its c. 1932 terminus.

== Route description ==
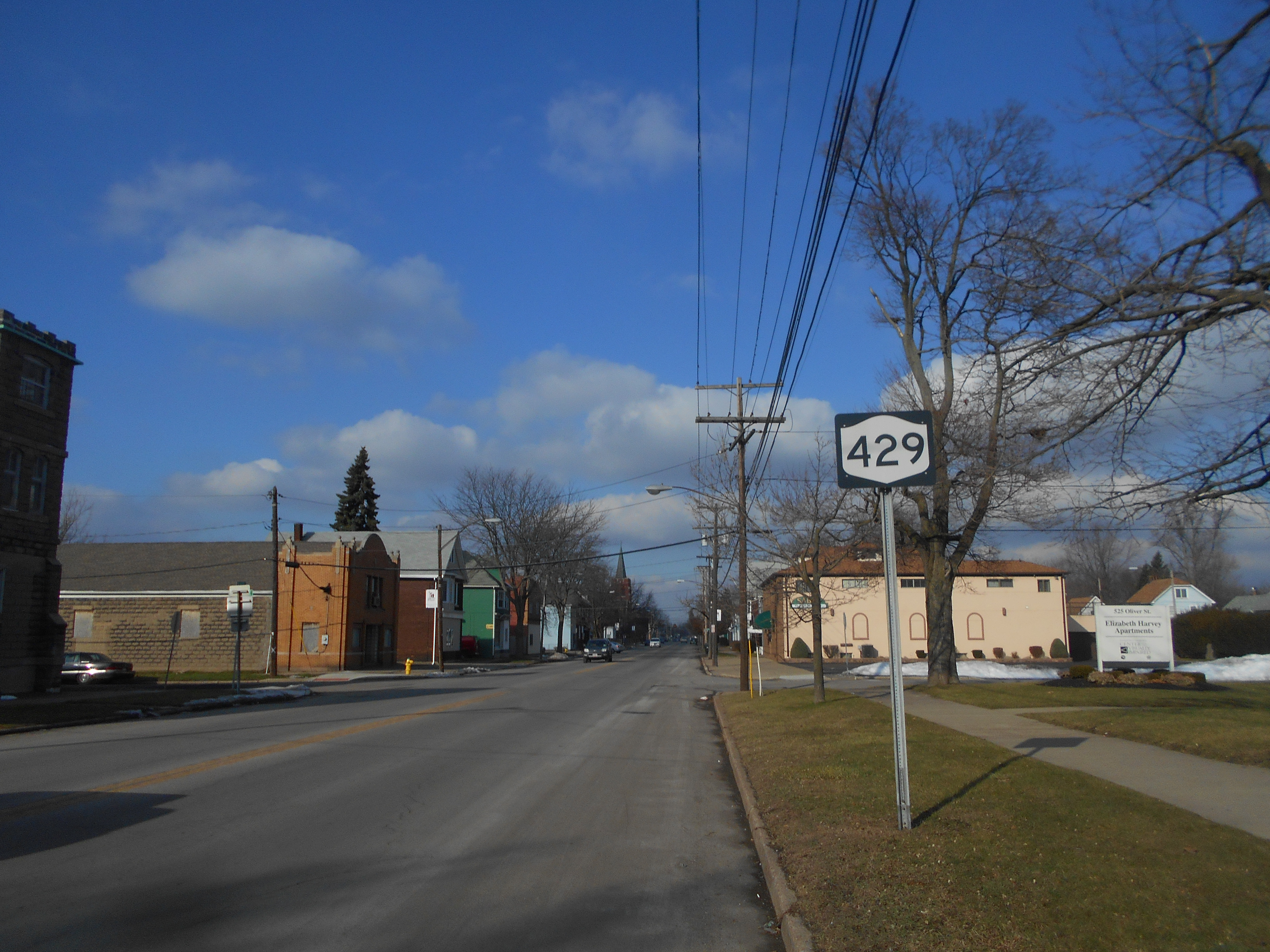
NY 429 in North Tonawanda

NY 429 begins on the banks of the Niagara River at a junction with NY 265 and NY 384 in downtown North Tonawanda. The route heads east as Wheatfield Street, crossing the CSX Transportation-owned Niagara Subdivision at a grade crossing that separates an industrialized block of the street from more residential sections to the east. After three blocks, NY 429 turns onto Oliver Street and follows it northwestward through residential and industrial portions of the city, paralleling NY 265 and NY 384 for 1.5 miles (2.4 km) to a junction with Ward Road. Oliver Street and Ward Road merge here, and the combined street takes on the Ward Road name as it proceeds due northward through the solely residential northern portion of North Tonawanda. NY 429 exits the city near a junction with Ruie Road, at which point maintenance of the route shifts from the city to the New York State Department of Transportation (NYSDOT).

Now in the town of Wheatfield, NY 429 heads across populated but less developed areas on its way to a junction with US 62. North of this point, the closely spaced homes gradually give way to more isolated houses and, eventually, rural farmland. It continues on a north–south line to the town of Lewiston and the hamlet of Sanborn, located adjacent to the Lewiston–Cambria town line. In the small but developed community, NY 429 follows Buffalo Street past three blocks of homes to a junction with NY 31 (Saunders Settlement Road). Buffalo Street ends here; however, NY 429 joins NY 31 for two blocks east to Townline Road, a north–south highway delimiting the boundary between Lewiston and Cambria. NY 429 continues north on Townline Road, passing the sprawling main campus of SUNY Niagara, a stark departure from the rural fields that NY 429 traversed in Wheatfield.

Past the college, NY 429 follows the Lewiston–Cambria town line for the rest of its length. In terms of elevation, it reaches a crest of 644 feet (196 m) at Upper Mountain Road in Pekin before it begins to descend the Niagara Escarpment, a beach ridge that further west led to the formation of Niagara Falls eons ago. Here, on clear enough days, a wide panorama can be seen of the entire northern half of the county and Lake Ontario. After descending 100 feet (30 m), it crosses a narrow plateau containing Lower Mountain Road. Another 150-foot (46 m) drop follows, and NY 429 ends shortly afterward at a junction with NY 104 (Ridge Road) located 392 feet (119 m) above sea level—a 252-foot (77 m) descent from Pekin. During this final, mostly undeveloped stretch, NY 429 passes the Buffalo Diocese's Immaculate Conception Catholic Church.

== History ==
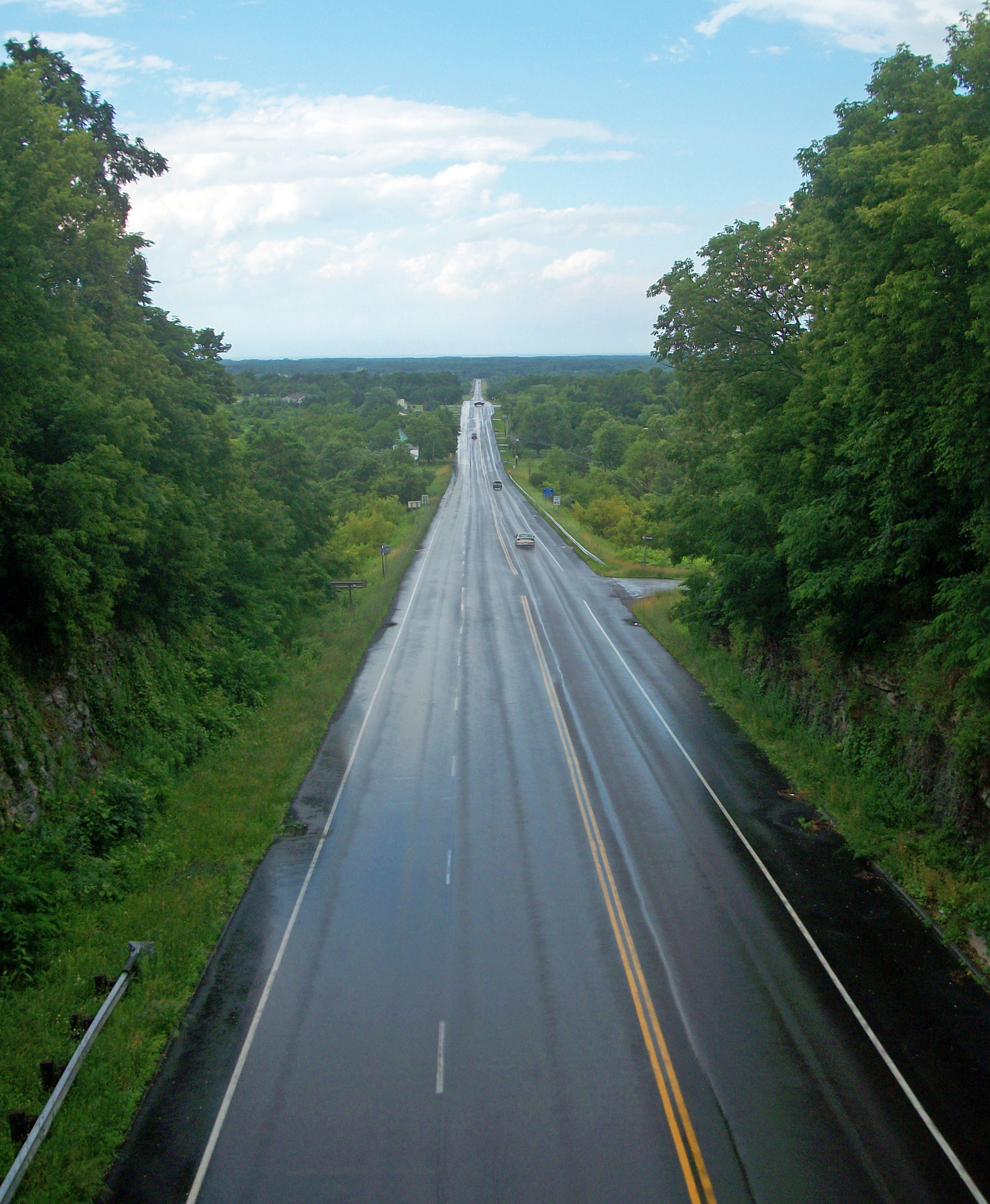
View north from Pekin

The portion of modern NY 429 north of Sanborn was originally designated as part of Route 30, an unsigned legislative route, by the New York State Legislature in 1908. Route 30 entered Sanborn from the west on what is now NY 31 and followed current NY 429 north to Ridge Road, where it turned east toward Rochester. All of legislative Route 30 west of Rochester became part of NY 31 in the mid-1920s, while the remainder of what is now NY 429 outside of North Tonawanda was taken over by the state of New York by 1926. In the late 1920s, NY 31 was realigned between Niagara Falls and the Lewiston–Cambria town line to follow Ridge Road west to the village of Lewiston. Its former routing to Niagara Falls via Sanborn became NY 31A.

In the 1930 renumbering of state highways in New York, the Niagara Falls–Sanborn leg of NY 31A became part of a realigned NY 3, which had followed modern NY 425 from North Tonawanda to Saunders Settlement Road prior to the renumbering. Despite this fact, NY 31A continued to extend west to Niagara Falls, creating an overlap with the cross-state NY 3. The overlap remained in place until c. 1935 when US 104 was assigned across Upstate New York. West of Rochester, it replaced NY 31, which was shifted southward to follow all of NY 3 from Niagara Falls to Rochester. NY 31A, meanwhile, was eliminated and partially replaced with NY 429, a route created c. 1932 that continued south from Sanborn to North Tonawanda via Ward Road and Oliver and Wheatfield Streets. NY 429 has not been substantially altered since that time.

== Major intersections ==
The entire route is in Niagara County.

Location	mi	km	Destinations	Notes
North Tonawanda	0.00	0.00	NY 265 / NY 384 (River Road)	Southern terminus
Wheatfield	3.98	6.41	US 62 (Niagara Falls Boulevard)	Hamlet of St. Johnsburg
Town of Lewiston	7.87	12.67	NY 31 west – Niagara Falls	Hamlet of Sanborn; western terminus of NY 31 / NY 429 overlap
Lewiston–Cambria town line	8.12	13.07	NY 31 east – Lockport	Hamlet of Sanborn; eastern terminus of NY 31 / NY 429 overlap
Lewiston–Cambria town line	12.16	19.57	NY 104 (Ridge Road) – Lewiston, Niagara Falls, Rochester	Northern terminus
1.000 mi = 1.609 km; 1.000 km = 0.621 mi: Concurrency terminus
