= Niagara, New York =

Niagara, New York Onguiaahra (Iroquoian languages)
- Town
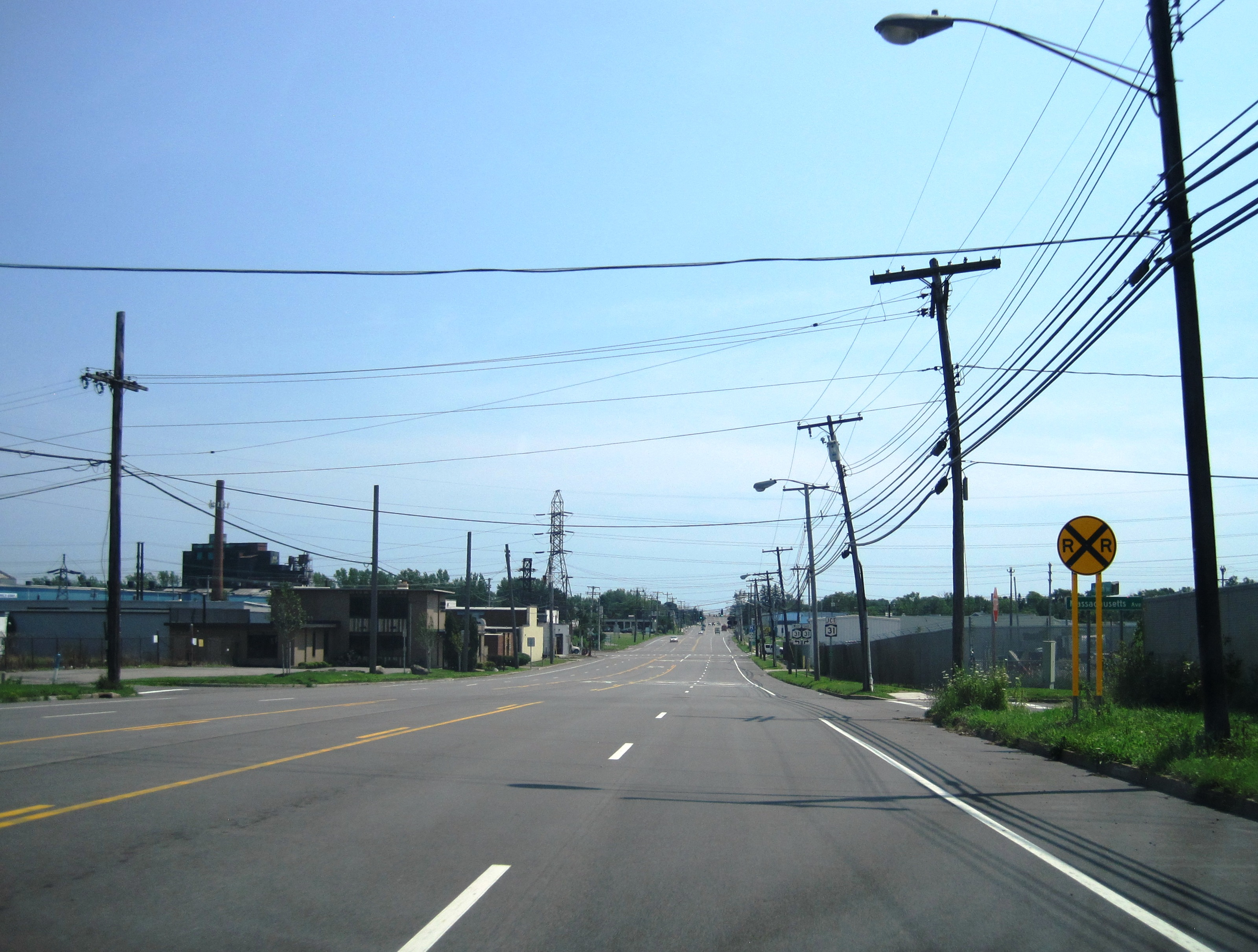
- Hyde Park Boulevard (NY 61) southbound on the border of the town of Niagara and city of Niagara Falls (town on left)

- Flag Seal
- Motto: A Great Place to Live, Work & Shop
- Location in Niagara County and the state of New York.

- Location within the state of New York Niagara (the United States)
- Coordinates: 43°6′58″N 78°59′22″W
- Country: United States
- State: New York
- County: Niagara

Government
  - Type: Town Council
  - Body: Niagara Town Council
  - Town Supervisor: Sylvia Virtuoso (D)
  - Town Council: Members' List: • Marc M. Carpenter (D); • Michael Lee (D); • Johnny Parks (D); • Charles F. Texeira (D)

Area
  - Total: 9.48 sq mi (24.56 km^{2})
  - Land: 9.48 sq mi (24.56 km^{2})
  - Water: 0 sq mi (0.00 km^{2})
- Elevation: 620 ft (190 m)

Population (2010)
  - Total: 8,378
  - Estimate (2016): 8,081
  - Density: 850/sq mi (329/km^{2})
- Time zone: UTC-5 (Eastern (EST))
  - Summer (DST): UTC-4 (EDT)
- ZIP Codes: 14304-14305 (Niagara Falls)
- Area code: 716
- FIPS code: 36-51033
- GNIS feature ID: 0979275
- Website: www.townofniagarany.gov

Niagara is a town in Niagara County, New York, United States. At the time of the 2020 census, the town had a total population of 7,903. The town is named after the famous waterfall Niagara Falls.

The Town of Niagara is in the southwestern portion of Niagara County, borders the City of Niagara Falls (which is next to the famed Niagara Falls). Also located partially within the town is Niagara Falls International Airport, which serves the Niagara County area.

It is served by the LaSalle Post Office on Niagara Falls Boulevard (U.S. Route 62) in adjacent Niagara Falls, New York. Residents use a mailing address of "Niagara Falls, NY" because of this. Neither "Niagara, NY," nor "Town of Niagara, NY" are acceptable postal addresses, according to the United States Postal Service.

== History ==
The Town of Niagara was founded in 1812 (originally as the "Town of Schlosser" after the local fortification Fort Schlosser and its first commander Captain Joseph Schlosser, a German officer in the British Army from the Town of Cambria. In 1836 eastern parts of the town were organized as the Town of Wheatfield, New York.

In 1892, the City of Niagara Falls was formed from the western end of town, taking about half of its land. In 1897, the Village of LaSalle was incorporated in what was then the southeast corner of the town. LaSalle was in turn annexed by the City of Niagara Falls in 1927, reducing the size of the Town of Niagara to 9.4 square miles (24 km^{2}). Its borders have remained the same since.

== Geography ==
According to the United States Census Bureau, the town has a total area of 9.4 square miles (24 km^{2}), all land.

=== Adjacent cities and towns ===
- Town of Lewiston - north
- Town of Wheatfield - east
- City of Niagara Falls - west, south

=== Major highways in the Town of Niagara ===
- Interstate 190 (Niagara Expressway), This interstate through the western part of town from the Niagara Falls city line to the Lewiston town line. In the town, there are exits at Porter Rd. (NY 182) and Witmer Rd. (NY 31).
- U.S. Route 62 (Niagara Falls Blvd.), North-South highway that has a short distance in the town from the Wheatfield town line to the Niagara Falls city line.
- New York State Route 31 (Witmer Rd., Saunders Settlement Rd.), East-West Highway across the northwestern part of town from the Lewiston town line to the Niagara Falls city line.
- New York State Route 61 (Hyde Park Blvd.), North-South Roadway mostly in the City of Niagara Falls, but has a short distance in the southwest corner of town where the route has its northern end at Lewiston Rd. (NY 104).
- New York State Route 182 (Porter Rd.), East-West roadway through the town from the Niagara Falls city line near its interchange with I-190 to its eastern terminus at Niagara Falls Blvd. (US 62).
- New York State Route 265 (Military Rd.), North-South roadway through the town from the Niagara Falls city line to the Lewiston town line.

== Notable persons ==
- James Madison, Medal of Honor recipient
- William L. Ross, Politician

== Demographics ==
Historical population
Census	Pop.	Note	%±
1820	484		—
1830	1,401		189.5%
1840	1,277		−8.9%
1850	1,951		52.8%
1860	6,603		238.4%
1870	6,832		3.5%
1880	7,432		8.8%
1890	10,979		47.7%
1900	1,066		−90.3%
1910	1,648		54.6%
1920	4,173		153.2%
1930	865		−79.3%
1940	2,618		202.7%
1950	4,729		80.6%
1960	7,503		58.7%
1970	8,368		11.5%
1980	9,648		15.3%
1990	9,880		2.4%
2000	8,978		−9.1%
2010	8,378		−6.7%
2020	7,903		−5.7%
2023 (est.)	7,723		−2.3%
U.S. Decennial Census

The stark drop in population from 1890 to 1900 was due to the creation of the Niagara Reservation State Park. The park's establishment had demolished many factories and removed the shantytowns of the workers who lived there. As of the census of 2020, there were 7,903 people and 3,426 households residing in the town. The racial makeup of the town was 85.9% White, 3.4% African American, 2.3% Native American, 0.6% Asian, 0.3% Pacific Islander, and 6.9% from two or more races. Hispanic or Latino of any race were 6.4% of the population.

The average household size is 2.3 persons per household.

In the town, the population is shrinking and getting older, with 14.8% under the age of 18, a decrease from 23.4% in 2010. In 2020, 24.6% were 65 years of age or older, an increase from 14.6% in 2010. In 2020, only 2.8% of the population is 5 years of age or younger. The population has become more male dominant as well, with only 47.2% of the Town of Niagara population identifying as female, compared to the national average 50.5%.

There are many military veterans in the Town of Niagara, which may be attributed to the close proximity of many military installations in the area. In 2020, 525 people, or roughly 6.5% of the population in the Town identified as a veteran.

The median income for a household in the town was $57,696 (in 2022 dollars). The per capita income for the town was $32,853. About 17% of the population is below the poverty line, an increase from 9.3% in 2010.

== Communities ==
- Pletchers Corners
- Cayuga Village
- Belden Center
- Colonial village

== Government ==
The Town is governed by the Town Supervisor form of government led by an elected Supervisor and four Town Council members. The Town Supervisor is currently Sylvia Virtuoso (D), who previously served as the Town Clerk since 1999. Supervisor Virtuoso assumed office in 2024 as the lone candidate in an uncontested election. She became the first woman elected as Town Supervisor in Niagara.

The Town of Niagara is represented by two Legislators in the Niagara County Legislature. Christopher McKimmie (R) is the 3rd District Legislator, representing the southern portion of the town, which includes the shopping district along Military Road (NY 265) and Cayuga Village. Christopher Robbins (D), is the 5th District Legislator, who represents the remainder of the Town of Niagara. Legislator Robbins also serves as the minority leader of the Niagara County Legislature.

In state government, the Town of Niagara is a part of the 145th Assembly District and the 62nd Senate District. Currently, Angelo Morinello (R) serves as the Town's representative in the New York State Assembly and Robert Ortt (R) serves as the Town's representative in the New York State Senate. Senator Ortt also serves as the Minority Leader in the New York State Senate.

== Education ==
The Town of Niagara is served by the Niagara Wheatfield Central School District. More than 3900 students attend the district’s elementary, middle and senior high school programs.

Niagara County has collegiate institutions that serve Town of Niagara residents including SUNY Niagara (formerly known as Niagara County Community College) and Niagara University.

== Public Safety ==
The Town of Niagara Police Department serves and protects the Town community by enforcing local and state law. The department is currently led by Police Chief Craig Guiliani and the department headquarters is located at 7105 Lockport Road. Although town records made mention of constables working in the Town of Niagara as far back as the early eighteen hundreds, it was not until 1954 that the Town of Niagara Police Department was officially formed. The Town of Niagara Police Department is a separate agency from that of the Niagara Falls Police Department, which serves the City of Niagara Falls, New York. However, both agencies work closely together.

The Town is additionally served by the Niagara County Sheriff's Office which has a zone car assigned to the Town of Niagara. The New York State Police provide services also and have a station within the Town as well on Witmer Road.

Niagara Active Hose Company is a 100% volunteer fire company and provides fire protection to the entire Town of Niagara. The Town is primarily served by Mercy EMS for ground ambulance services and Mercy Flight for air ambulance services. Mutual-aid agreements provide additional coverage from neighboring fire companies and EMS organizations.

== Economy ==
Major employers in Niagara are retail stores along major routes in town, including:

- Fashion Outlets of Niagara Falls
- Niagara Stone Corporation Redland Quarry - limestone quarry
- Niagara Falls International Airport
  - New York Air National Guard
  - New York Air Force Reserves
  - Air Force Reserve Center
- Wegmans (Hills) Plaza
- Mil-Pine Plaza
- Witmer Industrial Estate
