= List of former state routes in New York =

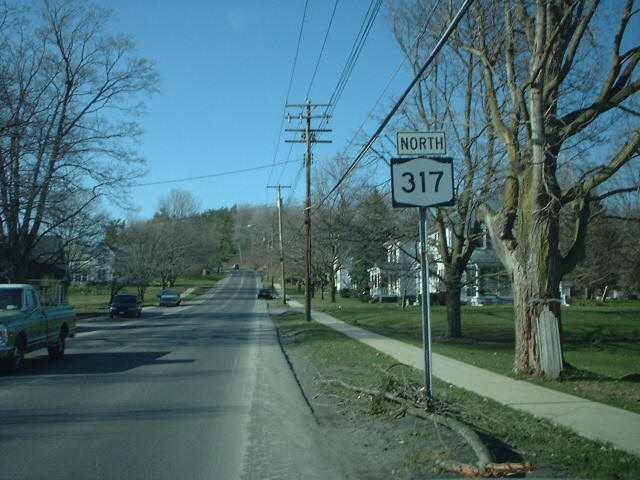
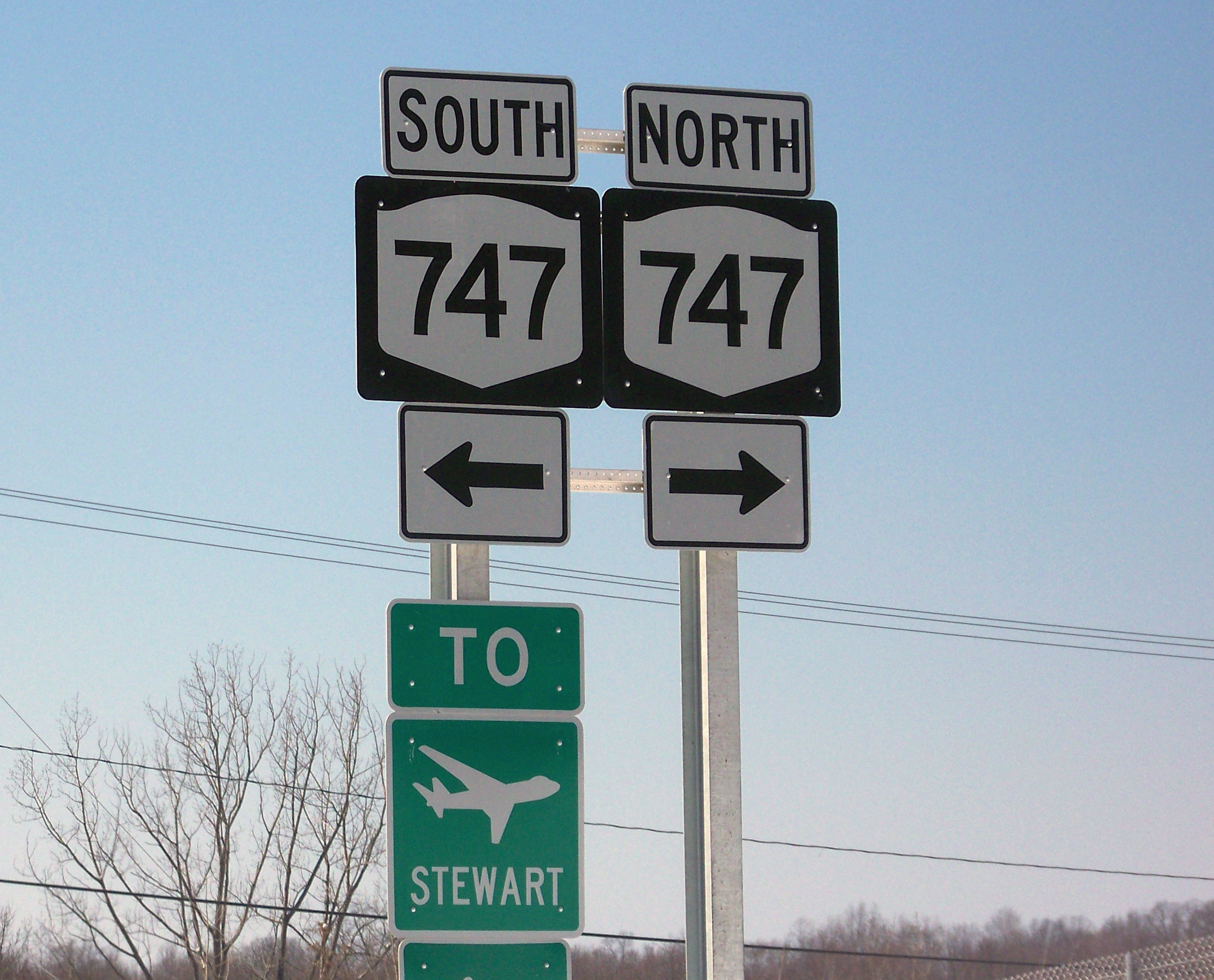
- Standard signage for state routes, auxiliary state routes, and reference routes

Highway names
- Interstates: Interstate X (I-X)
- US Highways: U.S. Route X (US X)
- State: New York State Route X (NY Route X; NY X)

System links
- New York Highways; Interstate; US; State; Reference; Parkways

The modern New York state route system was created in 1924 and initially consisted of roughly two dozen routes. As the system has been expanded and refined in the years since, hundreds of routes have been eliminated for several reasons. These reasons range from eliminating numerical duplication with a U.S. Highway or an Interstate Highway in New York to the removal of the highway from the state highway system. Many of the designations listed in the lists below have been reused for unrelated highways located elsewhere in New York.

== Lists of former routes ==
The list has been split across several pages due to the collective size of the list and the number of references used in the list.

- List of former state routes in New York (1–25)
- List of former state routes in New York (26–50)
- List of former state routes in New York (51–100)
- List of former state routes in New York (101–200)
- List of former state routes in New York (201–300)
- List of former state routes in New York (301–400)
- List of former state routes in New York (401–500)

== See also ==
- List of state routes in New York for a list of all current state routes
