= Wheatfield, New York =

- Town
- Flag Seal

- Location in Niagara County and the state of New York.

- Location within New York Location within the United States
- Coordinates: 43°5′32″N 78°53′42″W
- Country: United States
- State: New York
- County: Niagara

Government
  - Type: Town Council
  - Town Supervisor: Don MacSwan (R)
  - Town Council: Members' List: • Gilbert G. Doucet (R); • Larry L. Helwig (R); • Randy Retzlaff (R); • Curt Doktor (R)

Area
  - Total: 28.59 sq mi (74.05 km^{2})
  - Land: 27.90 sq mi (72.27 km^{2})
  - Water: 0.69 sq mi (1.78 km^{2})
- Elevation: 577 ft (176 m)

Population (2010)
  - Total: 18,117
  - Estimate (2016): 18,284
  - Density: 655.2/sq mi (252.99/km^{2})
- Time zone: UTC-5 (Eastern (EST))
  - Summer (DST): UTC-4 (EDT)
- ZIP Codes: 14120 (North Tonawanda); 14132 (Sanborn); 14304 (Niagara Falls)
- Area code: 716
- FIPS code: 36-81380
- GNIS feature ID: 0979632
- Website: Town of Wheatfield

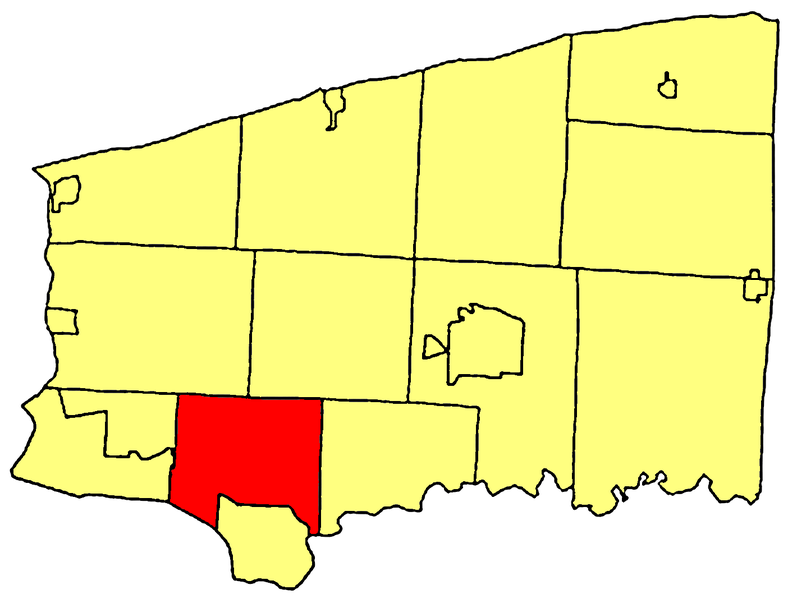
Location within Niagara County.

Wheatfield is a town in Niagara County, New York, United States. The population was 18,117 at the 2010 census. The name stems from the agricultural use of the town lands, the growing of wheat.

The Town of Wheatfield is east of Niagara Falls International Airport.

== History ==
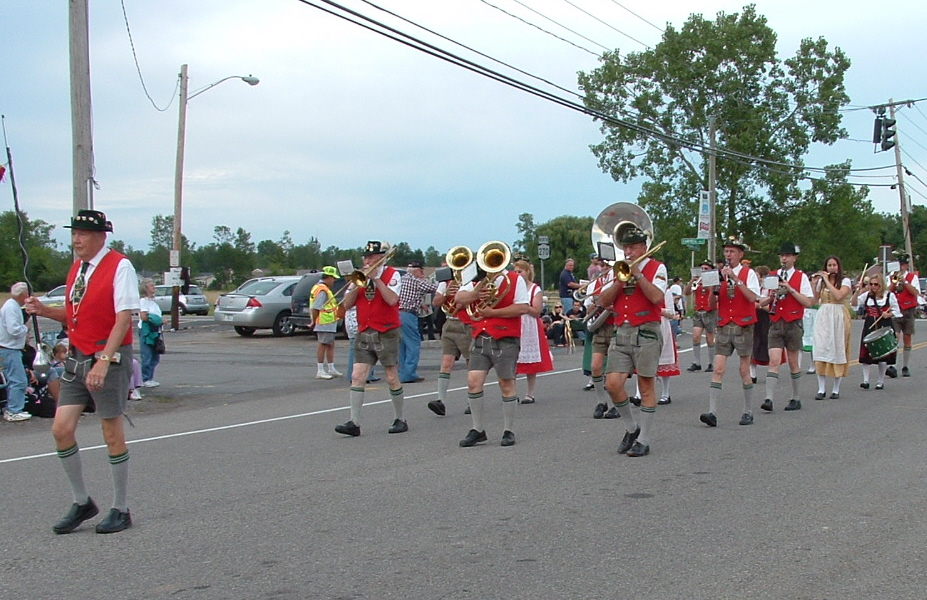
Bergholz German Band, based in Wheatfield

The Town of Wheatfield was formed in 1836 from the Town of Niagara. It is situated in the southwest part of the county, surrounded by the towns of Lewiston and Cambria to the north, Pendleton to the east, the City of North Tonawanda and the Niagara River to the south, and the City of Niagara Falls and Town of Niagara to the west.

The earliest known settler on the site of present-day Martinsville in North Tonawanda was George N. Burger, who came in 1809, built a log tavern on the river, and remained a resident until about 1825. Joshua Pettit came in 1810 and settled near the Niagara Iron Works, where he opened a tavern. He was the father of Mrs. Daniel C. Jacobs and Mrs. Whitman Jacobs. Stephen Jacobs, a soldier at the Battle of Bunker Hill, located on the river two miles (3 km) below in 1817, where he purchased 196 acres (0.79 km^{2}) of Augustus Porter, paying eight dollars an acre. He died in Niagara Falls in January 1840.

William Vandervoorte settled here in 1825, occupying a log house which tradition says was the only one then in existence. It was his intention to make a business of purchasing staves and timber for the Boston market, and ultimately to open a mercantile business. In 1828, he finished the first public house in the place, which was called the Niagara; it was burned in 1844. Later he purchased 1,000 acres (4.0 km^{2}) of land of the Holland Company and sold to Prussian immigrants the largest part of their possessions on Tonawanda Creek and its vicinity. He established the first bank in 1836. As before indicated, little progress of a business nature was made here until the opening of the Erie Canal. The interior of the town was still almost an unbroken wilderness and, as late as 1850, a large part of the area of the town was unimproved.

The first town meeting was held on June 6, 1836, in the schoolhouse of District No. 7, on the north line of the town. The soil of the town, clay loam, is very good for wheat crops in particular, and leads to the origin of the name Wheatfield.

Starting in 1843, German immigrants in the region established the communities of Bergholz (called at first "Neu Bergholz" and named for the village of Bergholz in the Ukermark region of eastern Germany), St. Johnsburg (originally known as "Little Bergholz"), Walmore (first known as "Walmow" and originally acquired from a Mennonite community), Martinsville, and Gratwick. The latter two towns are now part of North Tonawanda. Later, other communities were formed at railroad stops and along major highways.

In the 1920s, the River Road section of the Town became a prosperous farm area, including the showplace "Wheatfield Farms". Vacation cottages, beaches, an amusement park, and nightclubs were all constructed along the river. Permanent housing has since replaced most of these, but some remnants are still visible along River Road.

During World War II, industries located in the Town. The largest was Bell Aircraft (later Bell Aerospace) founded by Larry Bell which produced, for example, the World War II fighter plane, P-39 Airacobra. One Russian-leased example of this aircraft is on display at the Niagara Aerospace Museum. 10% of all aircraft production by the United States was produced in Western New York and by Bell in particular. Later, the company made products for the aerospace industry. This included aspects of the Apollo Program such as the Apollo Lunar Module propulsion system. With the closure of the facility in 1990, the vast plant was repurposed as a mixed-business complex, including a branch of the Lockheed Martin company.

During the postwar period, other industries and businesses were established in the town, including those serving the tourist trade such as motels and restaurants. The largest included Carborundum, Demler Cider Mill, Sawyer Creek Hotel, Loblaws grocery stores, assorted businesses and light manufacturing industries along Liberty Drive, and Thiele's dairy and bakery (defunct as of 1989), and plant nursery/agricultural supply company, which still exists to this day. The Niagara Falls Air Reserve Station is a major employer of the Town and of Niagara County, as is the Summit Medical Campus (in association with the Memorial Medical Center in Niagara Falls) which hosts the Summit Family Health Center among other specialist outlets.

Growth and prosperity in the town continued, as families migrated from nearby communities creating new neighborhoods. During this period, Summit Park Mall was built, opening in 1972 to serve the people of Wheatfield and nearby communities. The property closed as a mall by 2008 and is being redeveloped.

The largest spurt of growth in the town began in the 1980s and still continues today with many new housing developments emerging and new industrial and business parks being built. The population of the town now exceeds 18,000, which classifies it as a town of the first class, according to standard municipal classifications.

== Geography ==
According to the United States Census Bureau, the town has a total area of 28.6 square miles (74 km^{2}), of which 27.9 square miles (72 km^{2}) is land and 0.7 square miles (1.8 km^{2}) 2.41% is water.

The Niagara River is part of the western border of the town.

=== Adjacent cities and towns ===
- City of North Tonawanda - south
- City of Niagara Falls - west
- Town of Niagara - west
- Town of Lewiston - northwest
- Town of Cambria - northeast
- Town of Pendleton - east
- Erie County, Town of Amherst - southeast
- Erie County, Town of Grand Island - southwest

=== Major highways in the Town of Wheatfield ===
- U.S. Route 62 (Niagara Falls Blvd.), North-South highway that crosses the town from Amherst town line to Niagara Falls city line.
- New York State Route 265 / New York State Route 384 (River Rd.), North-South highway through west part of town that parallels the Niagara River with both New York Routes NY 265 and NY 384; from the Niagara Falls city line to the North Tonawanda city line.
- New York State Route 425 (Shawnee Rd.), North-South roadway through the town from North Tonawanda city line to Cambria town line.
- New York State Route 429 (Ward Rd.), North-South roadway through the town from the North Tonawanda city line to the Lewiston town line.

== Demographics ==
Historical population
Census	Pop.	Note	%±
1840	1,057		—
1850	2,659		151.6%
1860	3,484		31.0%
1870	3,406		−2.2%
1880	4,390		28.9%
1890	4,015		−8.5%
1900	1,926		−52.0%
1910	1,792		−7.0%
1920	1,884		5.1%
1930	2,212		17.4%
1940	3,077		39.1%
1950	4,720		53.4%
1960	8,008		69.7%
1970	9,722		21.4%
1980	9,609		−1.2%
1990	11,125		15.8%
2000	14,086		26.6%
2010	18,117		28.6%
2020	18,638		2.9%
U.S. Decennial Census

Wheatfield is within the Buffalo–Niagara Falls metropolitan area. As of the 2010 United States census, the town's current population is 18,117.

As of the census of 2000, there were 14,086 people, 5,305 households, and 3,893 families residing in the town. The population density was 504.6 inhabitants per square mile (194.8/km^{2}). There were 5,555 housing units at an average density of 199.0 per square mile (76.8/km^{2}). The racial makeup of the town was 97.44% White, 0.99% African American, 0.43% Native American, 0.49% Asian, 0.04% Pacific Islander, 0.08% from other races, and 0.55% from two or more races. Hispanic or Latino of any race were 0.58% of the population.

There were 5,305 households, out of which 32.3% had children under the age of 18 living with them, 63.6% were married couples living together, 6.7% had a female householder with no husband present, and 26.6% were non-families. 22.6% of all households were made up of individuals, and 10.6% had someone living alone who was 65 years of age or older. The average household size was 2.58 and the average family size was 3.04.

In the town, the population was spread out, with 23.5% under the age of 18, 6.4% from 18 to 24, 29.1% from 25 to 44, 25.2% from 45 to 64, and 15.8% who were 65 years of age or older. The median age was 40 years. For every 100 females, there were 93.0 males. For every 100 females age 18 and over, there were 90.3 males.

The median income for a household in the town was $51,700, and the median income for a family was $61,315. Males had a median income of $42,076 versus $27,233 for females. The per capita income for the town was $22,184. About 2.5% of families and 4.2% of the population were below the poverty line, including 3.5% of those under age 18 and 5.9% of those age 65 or over.

== Public safety ==
The Town of Wheatfield has five volunteer fire companies. Those five departments are; Adams Fire Company, Bergholz Volunteer Fire Company, Frontier Volunteer Fire Company, Shawnee Volunteer Fire Company, and St. Johnsburg Fire Company.

The town has a volunteer ambulance corps, called Tri-Community Ambulance Service. Tri-Community Ambulance Service was established in 1956, and has four Advanced Life Support ambulances and one Advanced Life Support Rapid Response Vehicle.

The Town of Wheatfield has a Constable Department whose members are sworn Peace Officers under Article 2.10 of the New York State Criminal Procedure Law.

== Education ==
There are six public schools and four private schools in Wheatfield, including St. Peter's Lutheran Church and School & St. John Lutheran School.

== Notable people ==
- John Wayne Bobbitt, graduated from Niagara Wheatfield Senior High School in 1985
- Adam Clendening, NHL hockey player, raised in Wheatfield
- Robert Heisner, martial arts expert and Christian minister, who was awarded the Wheatfield Business Person of the Year and his Project Future Center was given the Business of the Year award
- Lewis S. Payne, businessman, Town Supervisor, later New York State Senator (R), and decorated Colonel in the Union Army in the American Civil War

== Communities and locations in Wheatfield ==
- Bergholz – A hamlet in the northwestern part of the town near the airport.
- Hoffman – A location on the eastern border of the town.
- Nashville – A location on US-62 in the southeast part of the town.
- Niagara Falls International Airport (IAG) – Part of the airport is in the northern part of the town.
- Sawyer – A hamlet on US-62 adjacent to the City of North Tonawanda.
- Shawnee – A hamlet on US-62 (Niagara Falls Boulevard).
- St. Johnsburg – A hamlet on US-62 near the center of the town.
- Walmore – A hamlet in the northwest part of the town on Lockport Road.

== Former hamlets of Wheatfield ==
- Martinsville (1836-1896). A hamlet that was later incorporated into the City of North Tonawanda.
