= Air Niagara =

Airship operator

- Founded: 1982; 44 years ago
- Ceased operations: 2023; 3 years ago
- Hubs: Niagara Falls International Airport
- Focus cities: Niagara Falls, Buffalo, NY
- Fleet size: 0
- Destinations: Niagara Falls, Buffalo, NY
- Headquarters: Niagara Falls, NY
- Total assets: ▼USD $0 (2023)
- Employees: 0 (2023)
- Website: Not Active

Air Niagara was a zeppelin blimp airship operator and formerly a scheduled passenger airline that previously operated jet aircraft based on the New York state side of the Niagara Falls. It was one of the many airlines that started flying after the Airline Deregulation Act of 1978 in the United States. The company was acquired in early 2022 and is currently working on operating zeppelin tours.

A Canadian-based airline which operated Convair 580 turboprop and Fokker F28 Fellowship jet aircraft in the province of Ontario also used the Air Niagara name from the late 1980s to 2000.

Air Niagara offered jet flights from Niagara Falls International Airport (IAG) with the assumption that tourism in their home region would propel the airline to profitability.

The airline was one of the few air carriers to serve that airport with scheduled passenger jet service with Air Niagara operating such flights from 1982 to 1984 (in 1983, Empire Airlines (1976-1985) was also operating jet service into the airport with Fokker F28 Fellowship twin jets). Air Niagara operated two Boeing 727-100s formerly operated by Eastern Air Lines (registrations N8101N and N8104N) and was serving only two routes in late 1982 with nonstop flights between Niagara Falls and Newark Airport (EWR) in New Jersey and also nonstop between Niagara Falls and John F. Kennedy International Airport (JFK) in New York City. In addition to its New York City services, according to the Official Airline Guide (OAG) Air Niagara was operating weekly nonstop 727 service between Niagara Falls and St. Petersburg, Florida (PIE) in 1983. The airline's 727s had been delivered new to Eastern in 1964 (both airplanes ended up being broken up and scrapped in Mexico in 1994).

Air Niagara ceased operations in 1984 until the company and trademark was acquired in 2022. Air Niagara now plans on offering blimp air flights in collaboration with Hybrid Air Vehicles, a British limited company and a British manufacturer of hybrid airships.

As of 2023, the company's assets have been resold and the current state of Air Niagara is unknown.
