= New York State Route 61 =

New York state highway

New York State Route 61
- Hyde Park Boulevard
- Map of the Buffalo–Niagara Falls area with NY 61 highlighted in red

Route information
- Maintained by NYSDOT and the city of Niagara Falls
- Length: 3.86 mi (6.21 km)
- Existed: 1958–present

Major junctions
- South end: NY 384 in Niagara Falls
- US 62 in Niagara Falls
- North end: NY 104 in Lewiston

Location
- Country: United States
- State: New York
- Counties: Niagara

Highway system
- New York Highways; Interstate; US; State; Reference; Parkways
← NY 60	→ US 62

New York State Route 61 (NY 61) is a state highway located almost entirely in the city of Niagara Falls in Niagara County, New York, in the United States. The road runs across the city in a northwest–southeast direction, terminating at NY 384 at its southern extent and NY 104 at its northern tip. Conceptually, the road, known as Hyde Park Boulevard, forms the eastern border of downtown Niagara Falls. It is the second-shortest two-digit route in New York after NY 71 in Columbia County. NY 61was designated was in 1958 after being approved by the Niagara Falls City Council.

== Route description ==
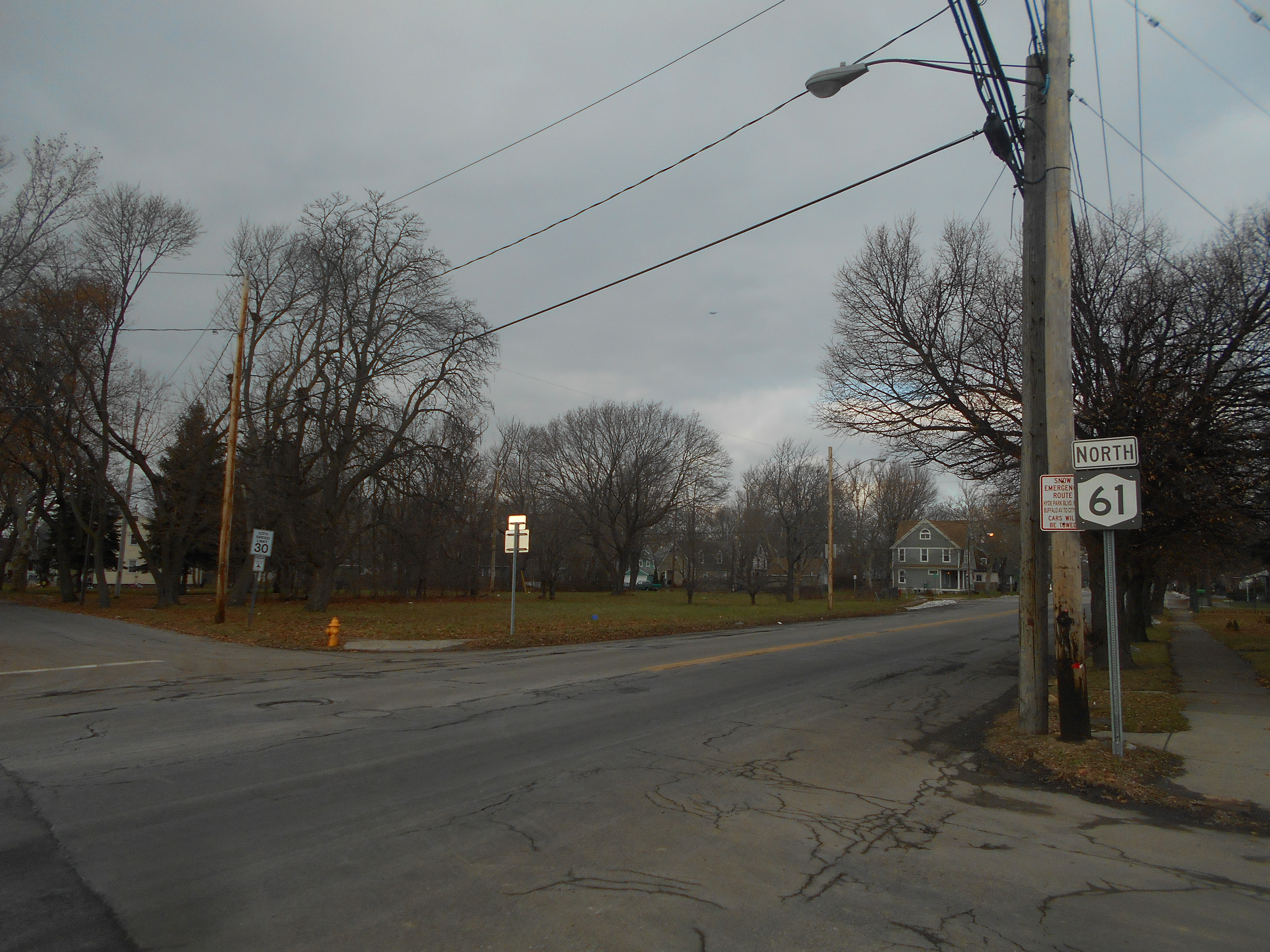
NY 61 northbound from NY 384 in Niagara Falls

NY 61 begins at an intersection with NY 384 (Buffalo Avenue) on the industrial banks of the Niagara River in eastern Niagara Falls. The route, named Hyde Park Boulevard for its entire length, heads north initially as a city-maintained, undivided four-lane highway; after two blocks, the roadway widens and becomes maintained by the New York State Department of Transportation. NY 61 continues onward through the densely populated neighborhoods of Niagara Falls to Packard Road, where the route begins to parallel Gill Creek, a small stream leading south to the Niagara River. After five blocks, NY 61 intersects with Ferry Avenue, a one-way street carrying southbound U.S. Route 62 (US 62), in the area of the Niagara Falls Courthouse. NY 61 intersects with northbound US 62 three blocks later at Walnut Avenue. At the intersection, Gill Creek passes under both US 62 northbound and NY 61 as it switches to the east side of Hyde Park Boulevard.

Gill Creek and NY 61 continue to run parallel for one more block before they separate ahead of Pine Avenue, once known as NY 62A and now designated as US 62 Business. The intersection between Pine and Hyde Park Boulevard marks the southwestern limits of Hyde Park, one of the largest parks in the vicinity of the city. For the next dozen blocks, NY 61 acts as the divider between the residential neighborhoods of downtown Niagara Falls and the open spaces of Hyde Park, passing Sal Maglie Stadium as it heads north. At Linwood Avenue, the homes return to both sides of NY 61 as it approaches Porter Road, which carries NY 182. While Porter Road ends here, NY 182 turns north, joining NY 61 for two blocks to Ontario Avenue, where NY 182 turns west toward the Whirlpool Rapids Bridge.

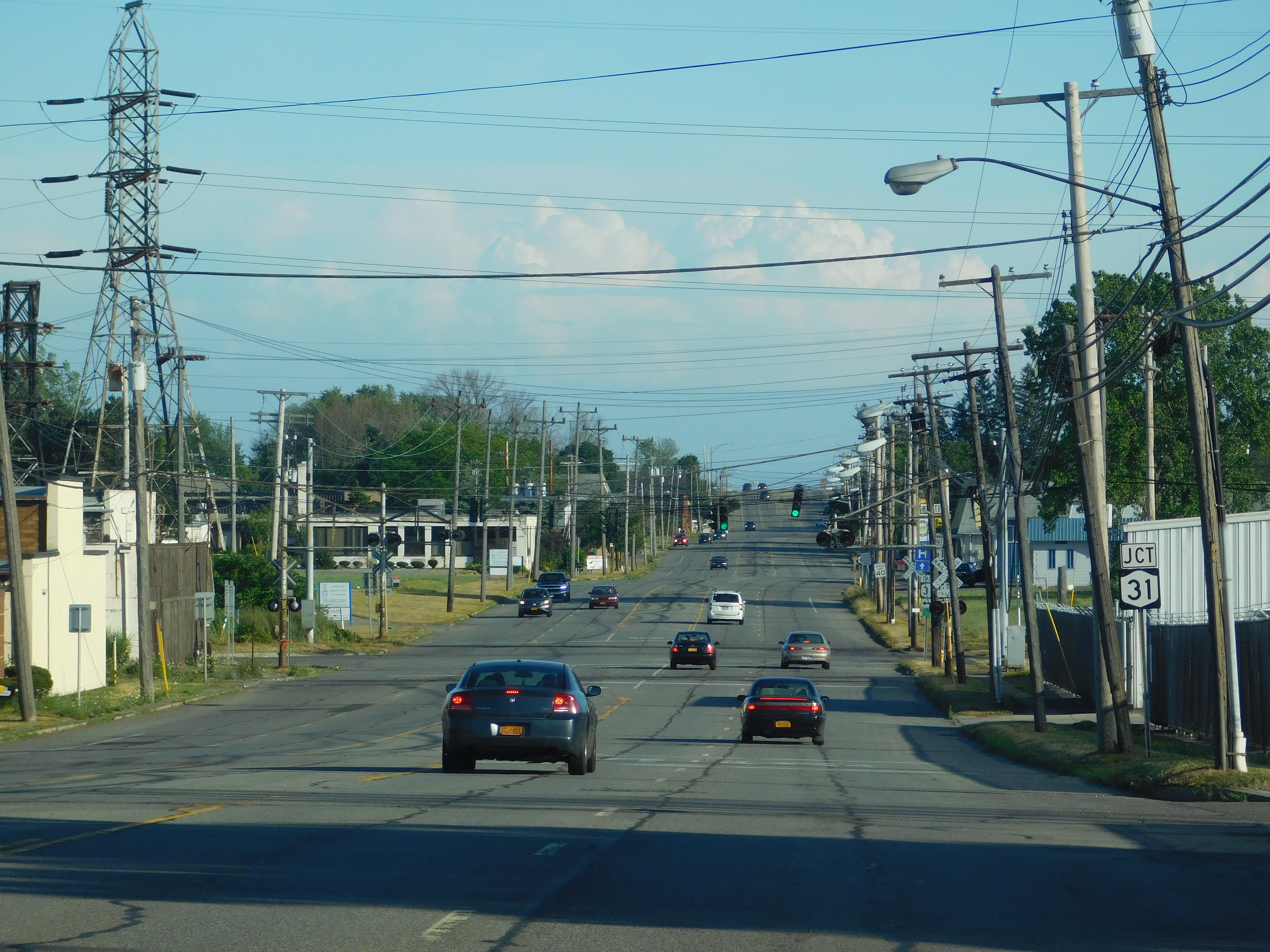
NY 61 southbound approaching NY 31 in Niagara Falls

North of Ontario Avenue, the buildings surrounding NY 61 become more commercial and industrial in nature as the route approaches the CSX Transportation Niagara Yard. It crosses over the western end of the yard before intersecting Lockport Road. The Niagara Falls Amtrak station, which Hyde Park Boulevard passes by but provides no access to, is located just off Lockport Road on 27th Street.

Away from the yard, the surroundings become residential once more for another four blocks before entering a heavily industrial neighborhood around an intersection with NY 31. Farther north in Lewiston, the center turn lane becomes a hard median as it widens in preparation for a pseudo-interchange with Highland Avenue. The median reverts to its previous width shortly after Highland merges into Hyde Park Boulevard; however, the median ends two blocks later at a service road for the Robert Moses Niagara Power Plant. NY 61, now a four-lane undivided highway once again, continues for another 0.25 miles (0.40 km) to the top of the Niagara River gorge, where it ends at NY 104 south of the Moses Power Plant and adjacent to the campus of Niagara University.

== History ==
In 1958, New York State Department of Public Works asked the city of Niagara Falls to approve a route designation for Hyde Park Boulevard to include on the state maps. In October 1958, the city agreed on the designation of NY 61 for the road. In 1962, the bridge carrying Hyde Park Boulevard over Gill Creek at Walnut Avenue, 41 feet (12 m) in length and originally built in 1950, was reconstructed. Farther north, the bridge over the western end of the CSX Transportation Niagara Yard, at 355 feet (108 m) long, was completed in 1964. It was reconstructed in 1997.

== Major intersections ==
The entire route is in Niagara County.

Location	mi	km	Destinations	Notes
Niagara Falls	0.00	0.00	NY 384	Southern terminus
Niagara Falls	0.67	1.08	US 62 south (Ferry Avenue)	
Niagara Falls	0.81	1.30	US 62 north (Walnut Avenue)	
Niagara Falls	0.93	1.50	US 62 Bus. (Pine Avenue)	
Niagara Falls	1.80	2.90	NY 182 east (Porter Road)	Southern terminus of NY 61 / NY 182 overlap
Niagara Falls	1.91	3.07	NY 182 west (Ontario Avenue)	Northern terminus of NY 61 / NY 182 overlap
Niagara Falls	2.87	4.62	NY 31	
Town of Lewiston	3.86	6.21	NY 104	Northern terminus
1.000 mi = 1.609 km; 1.000 km = 0.621 mi: Concurrency terminus
