= Walmore, New York =

Hamlet in New York, United States

Coordinates: 43°07′17″N 78°55′52″W

Walmore is a hamlet in the town of Wheatfield in Niagara County, New York, United States.

== Point of Interest ==
St. Peter's Lutheran Church and School

Walmore Inn - 2201 Lockport Rd, Sanborn, NY 14132
