= Shawnee, New York =

Hamlet in New York, United States

Coordinates: 43°07′41″N 78°50′16″W

Shawnee is a hamlet in the town of Wheatfield in Niagara County, New York, United States.
