= James Madison (Medal of Honor) =

- Born: 1842; Niagara, New York
- Died: August 7, 1926 (aged 83–84)
- Military career
- Allegiance: United States of America
- Branch: United States Army
- Service years: 1861 - 1865
- Rank: Sergeant
- Nickname: A.K.A. James Congdon
- Units: (New York (state)) Company E, 8th New York Volunteer Cavalry Regiment
- Conflicts: American Civil War
- Awards: Medal of Honor

James Madison (1842 – August 7, 1926) was a Sergeant in the United States Army and a Medal of Honor recipient for his role in the American Civil War. "James Madison" was an alias: his true name was James Congdon.

Congdon enlisted in the Army from Fairport, New York in October 1861, but was discharged for disability in January 1862. Despite this, he re-enlisted in May 1862, and fought at the Battle of Culpeper Court House, where he was wounded. He mustered out with his regiment in June 1865.

== Medal of Honor citation ==
Rank and organization. Sergeant, Company E, 8th New York Cavalry. Place and date: At Waynesboro, Virginia, March 2, 1865. Entered service at: Fairport, New York. Birth: Niagara, New York. Date of issue: March 26, 1865.

Citation:

Recapture of Gen. Crook's headquarters flag.

== See also ==
- List of Medal of Honor recipients
- List of American Civil War Medal of Honor recipients: A–F (For other name of James Congdon)
- List of American Civil War Medal of Honor recipients: M–P

== Notes ==
- Enlisted under the name of James Congdon.
