= List of former state routes in New York (26–50) =

This section of the list of former state routes in New York contains all routes numbered between 26 and 50.

Route	Southern or western terminus	Northern or eastern terminus	Formed	Removed
NY 26 (1924–1930)	NY 13 near Freeville	NY 5 in Camillus	1924	1930
NY 26A	NY 12 / NY 26 in Lowville	NY 3 in Carthage	1930	1978
NY 26B	NY 26 in Alexandria	NY 37 in Alexandria	ca. 1931	mid-1970s
NY 28B	NY 287 in Prospect	NY 12 / NY 28 in Remsen	ca. 1936	mid-1960s
NY 30 (1924–1930)	US 9 in Mechanicville	Canadian border at Mooers	1924	1930
NY 31A (Onondaga County)	NY 5 in Elbridge	NY 31 in Jordan	mid-1920s	1930
NY 31A (western Niagara County)	NY 3 / NY 18 in Niagara Falls	NY 31 on Lewiston–Cambria town line	late 1920s	1935
NY 31B (1932–1933)	US 11 in Cicero	NY 31 in Cicero	ca. 1932	ca. 1933
NY 31B	NY 31 in Weedsport	NY 5 in Elbridge	ca. 1933	1980
NY 31C	NY 5 in Elbridge	NY 31 in Jordan	ca. 1933	2003
NY 31D	Orleans–Monroe county line	NY 19 / NY 31 in Sweden	ca. 1935	ca. 1963
NY 32 (1920s-1930)	NY 5 in Amherst	Lake Road in Olcott	mid-1920s	1930
NY 32A (1930-early 1940s)	US 4 / NY 32 in Stillwater	US 4 / NY 32 in Schuylerville	1930	early 1940s
NY 32B	NY 32 in Queensbury	US 4 in Hudson Falls	1930	mid-1960s
NY 33B (1931-1940s)	NY 96 in Pittsford	NY 33 / NY 350 in Walworth	ca. 1931	1949
NY 33B (1962–1965)	NY 33A in Chili	NY 383 in Rochester	ca. 1962	ca. 1965
NY 33B (1965-1970s)	NY 33 in Buffalo	NY 33 in Cheektowaga	ca. 1965	mid-1970s
NY 34 (1924–1930)	NY 5 in Buffalo	Fort Niagara near Youngstown	1924	1930
NY 34A	NY 13 in Ithaca	NY 34 in Lansing	1930s	mid-1960s
NY 35 (mid-1920s-1927)	NY 16 in East Aurora	NY 4 near Livonia village	mid-1920s	1927
NY 35 (1927-early 1940s)	NY 36 in Wheatland	US 104 in Ontario	1927	early 1940s
NY 35A	US 62 / NY 18 in Buffalo	NY 35 in Cheektowaga	1930	mid-1930s
NY 35B	NY 35 / NY 47 in Rochester	NY 35 in Penfield	1930s	early 1940s
NY 36A	NY 36 in Dansville	NY 63 in Mount Morris	1930	early 1940s
NY 37 (mid-1920s-1927)	NY 17 in Monroe	Connecticut state line near Brewster	mid-1920s	1927
NY 37 (late 1920s-1930)	NY 40 in Cato	NY 31 in Baldwinsville	late 1920s	1930
NY 37A	NY 37 in Lisbon	NY 37 in Waddington	1930	1980
NY 37D	NY 37 in Theresa town	NY 26 in Theresa village	ca. 1936	mid-1960s
NY 38 (1920s-1930)	NY 62 near Angelica	NY 14 in Penn Yan	mid-1920s	1930
NY 39 (1920s-1930)	NY 21 in Poughkeepsie	NY 22 in Patterson	mid-1920s	1930
NY 40A	NY 40 in Schaghticoke	NY 40 / NY 67 in Schaghticoke	ca. 1933	late 1940s
NY 41 (1920s-1930)	Ferry landing at Barrytown	NY 22 in North East	mid-1920s	1930
NY 42 (1920s-1930)	NY 15 in Owego	NY 26 in Freeville	mid-1920s	1930
NY 44 (1920s-1930)	NY 7 in Sidney	NY 5 / NY 12 in Utica	mid-1920s	1930
NY 44 (1930–1935)	NY 13 in Caton	NY 3 in Wolcott	1930	1935
NY 44A	US 44 in Washington	US 44 / NY 82 in Millbrook	1980	2007
NY 45 (1920s-1930)	US 9E in Troy	MA 2 at the Massachusetts state line at Stephentown	mid-1920s	1930
NY 45 (1930-late 1949)	New Jersey state line at Warwick	US 9W in New Windsor	1930	1949
NY 46A	NY 49 / NY 365 in Rome	NY 46 in Western	1930	early 1950s
NY 47 (1920s-1930)	US 9 in Chestertown	NY 30 in Ticonderoga	mid-1920s	1930
NY 47 (1930–1936)	US 9 in Lake George	NY 8 in Hague	1930	1936
NY 47	NY 104 in Greece	Culver Road in Irondequoit	ca. 1937	1980
NY 48 (1920s-1930)	NY 12 in Lowville	NY 3 in Alexandria	mid-1920s	1930
NY 48A	NY 48 in Minetto	NY 48 in Oswego	ca. 1931	ca. 1940
NY 50 (mid-1920s-1927)	PA 7 at the Pennsylvania state line at Port Jervis	NY 10 in Kingston	mid-1920s	1927
