= U.S. Route 62 Business (Niagara Falls, New York) =

Business route in New York State

U.S. Route 62 Business
- Pine Avenue
- Map of Niagara Falls with US 62 Business highlighted in red

Route information
- Auxiliary route of US 62
- Maintained by the city of Niagara Falls
- Length: 2.12 mi (3.41 km)
- Existed: 2006–present

Major junctions
- West end: NY 104 in Niagara Falls
- East end: US 62 in Niagara Falls

Location
- Country: United States
- State: New York

Highway system
- United States Numbered Highway System; List; Special; Divided; New York Highways; Interstate; US; State; Reference; Parkways
← US 62	NY 62A	→ NY 63

U.S. Route 62 Business (US 62 Business) is a business route of US 62 located within the city of Niagara Falls, New York, in the United States. It follows Pine Avenue through downtown Niagara Falls, spanning 2.12 miles (3.41 km) between New York State Route 104 (NY 104) at its western terminus and US 62 at its eastern extent. Although it runs in a mostly east–west direction, it is signed as a north–south route due to US 62 being signed north–south as well within New York.

Pine Avenue was originally designated as part of NY 34 in 1924. It then became part of NY 18 after it replaced NY 34 in 1930. US 62 was extended into New York c. 1932, overlapping with NY 18 between Dayton and Niagara Falls. NY 18 was truncated to Lewiston, a village north of the city, in the early 1960s, making US 62 the sole occupant of Pine Avenue. US 62 was shifted onto its current alignment through the city later in the decade, allowing Pine Avenue to become New York State Route 62A in the early 1970s. NY 62A was redesignated as US 62 Business in 2006.

== Route description ==
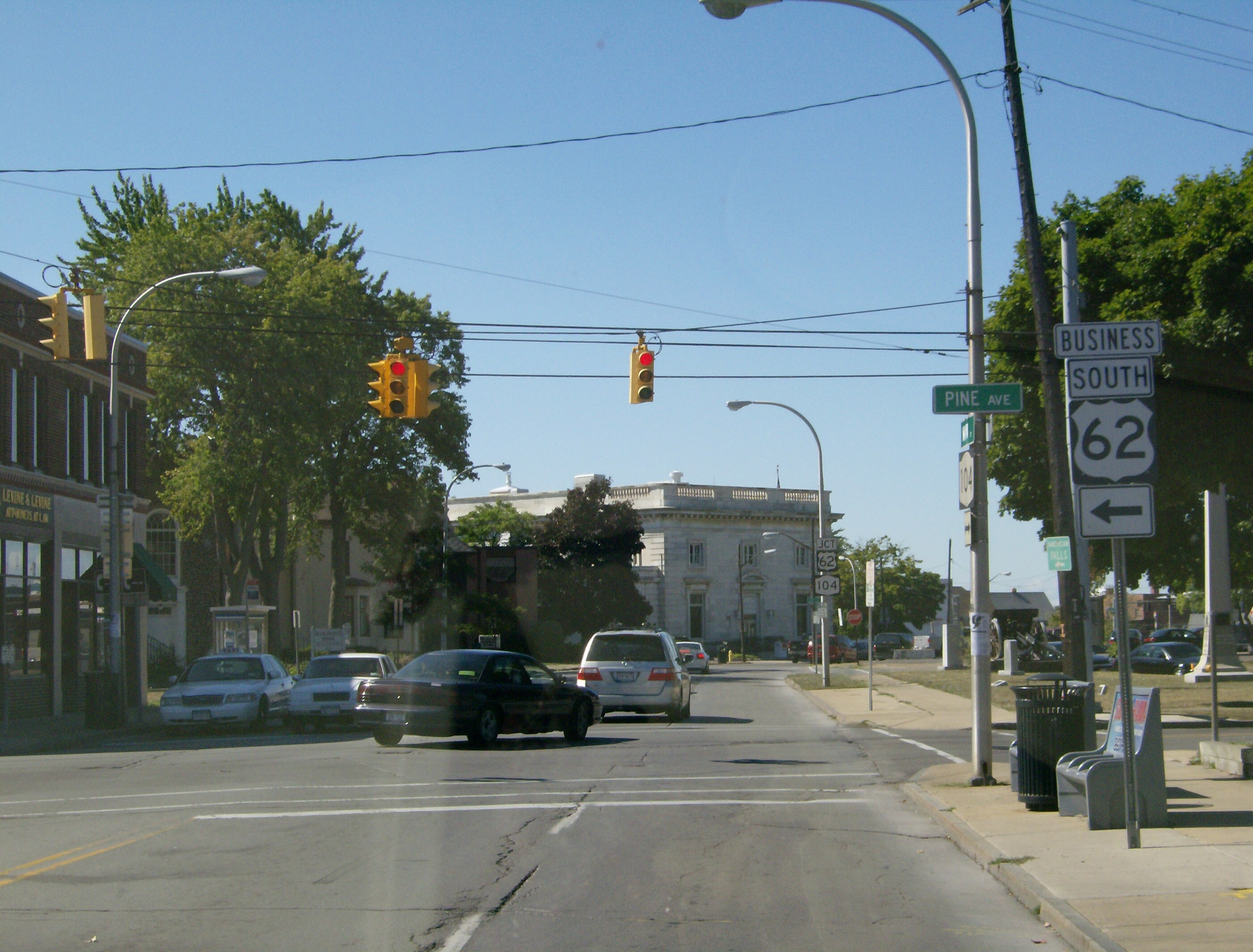
Northern (western) terminus of US 62 Business at NY 104

US 62 Business begins at the intersection of Main Street (NY 104) and Pine Avenue in downtown Niagara Falls. Unlike the two streets—Walnut and Ferry Avenues—that carry US 62 through Niagara Falls to the south, Pine Avenue is a two-way street, the first such east–west street accessible from NY 104 heading north from the Rainbow Bridge. Heading east from NY 104, US 62 Business passes through a largely commercial neighborhood. At a signalized intersection with 7th Street two blocks from NY 104, the surroundings become residential in nature; however, the road reenters strictly commercial areas at 10th Street. Between 10th and Portage Road, a local north–south arterial, US 62 Business passes along the northern edge of the Niagara Falls Memorial Medical Center.

Past Portage Road, US 62 Business runs past the northern grounds of the Niagara Arts and Cultural Center (the former location of Niagara Falls High School) as it enters a neighborhood of Niagara Falls known as "Little Italy", as denoted by a large overhead structure that spans the width of Pine Avenue. Although this area is mostly commercial as well, it features decorative elements not found west of Portage Road, such as stylized streetlights alongside the roadway. The district extends for 1.25 miles (2.01 km) eastward to Hyde Park Boulevard (NY 61), where another overhead sign denotes the eastern edge of Little Italy.

The last segment of US 62 Business differs greatly from the remainder of the route. On its northern edge, US 62 Business is bounded by Hyde Park, a large city park surrounding Gill Creek; to the south is a fully residential neighborhood. It is during this stretch that Pine Street widens from two to four traffic lanes (while Pine is four lanes wide its entire length, from NY 104 to NY 61 the extra lanes are for parking). 0.34 miles (0.55 km) east of NY 61, US 62 Business breaks from its strictly east–west routing and curves south to meet US 62. US 62 Business northbound (west) begins at Walnut Avenue (US 62 north); however, US 62 Business south continues for another 0.25 miles (0.40 km) to the junction of Packard Road (US 62 south) and Niagara Falls Boulevard (bi-directional US 62). All of US 62 Business is maintained by the city of Niagara Falls.

== History ==
New York State Route 62A
- Location: Niagara Falls
- Existed: early 1970s–2006

Pine Avenue in Niagara Falls was originally designated as part of NY 34 when the first set of posted routes in New York were assigned in 1924. In the 1930 renumbering of state highways of New York, NY 34 was replaced by an extended NY 18. When US 62 was extended into New York c. 1932, it overlapped NY 18 from Dayton to Niagara Falls. US 62 then ended at the junction of Pine Avenue and Main Street while NY 18 continued north on Main Street toward Lewiston. This overlap remained in place until c. 1962 when NY 18 was truncated to then-US 104 in Lewiston.

US 62 remained routed on Pine Avenue until the mid-1960s when it was shifted south onto Walnut and Ferry Avenues, which had been transformed into a one-way couplet. Its former routing on Pine Avenue was designated as NY 62A in the early 1970s. This designation remained in place until 2006 when NY 62A was redesignated as US 62 Business by the American Association of State Highway and Transportation Officials at the request of the New York State Department of Transportation and the city of Niagara Falls.

== Major intersections ==
The entire route is in Niagara Falls, Niagara County.

mi	km	Destinations	Notes
0.00	0.00	NY 104 (Main Street)	Western terminus
1.63	2.62	NY 61 (Hyde Park Boulevard)	
2.12	3.41	US 62 (Niagara Falls Boulevard)	Eastern terminus
1.000 mi = 1.609 km; 1.000 km = 0.621 mi
