= List of former state routes in New York (1–25) =

This section of the list of former state routes in New York contains all routes numbered between 1 and 25.

Route	Southern or western terminus	Northern or eastern terminus	Formed	Removed
NY 1 (1924-1927)	New York City line	Connecticut state line at Port Chester	1924	1927
NY 1A	NY 27 in Manhattan	US 1 in Pelham Manor	1934	ca. 1962
NY 1B (1932-1941)	NY 1A in the Bronx	US 1 in New Rochelle	ca. 1932	ca. 1941
NY 1B	Triborough Bridge in The Bronx	Grand Concourse in The Bronx	ca. 1941	by 1947
NY 1X	Eastern Boulevard in The Bronx	NY 1A in The Bronx	1941	1946
NY 2 (1924-1927)	PA 2 at the Pennsylvania state line at Kirkwood	NY 6 in Rouses Point	1924	1927
NY 2 (1927-1939)	US 15 at the Pennsylvania state line at Lindley	NY 31 in Rochester	1927	ca. 1939
NY 2 (1939-early 1940s)	NY 17 / NY 17C in Owego	NY 33 / NY 35 in Rochester	ca. 1939	early 1940s
NY 2A (mid-1930s-1927)	NY 2 in Potsdam	NY 2 / NY 56 in Lawrence	mid-1920s	1927
NY 2A (1930-1939)	NY 2 in Springwater	NY 2 in Rochester	1930	ca. 1939
NY 2A (1939-early 1940s)	NY 2 in Interlaken	US 20 / NY 5 in Waterloo	ca. 1939	early 1940s
NY 3A (1930-1932)	NY 3 / NY 271 in Middleport	NY 19 near Medina	1930	ca. 1932
NY 3A (1932-1935)	NY 3 / NY 425 in Lockport	NY 3 / NY 93 in Lockport	ca. 1932	ca. 1935
NY 3B (1930-1932)	NY 237 in Clarendon	NY 3 / NY 63 in Sweden	1930	ca. 1932
NY 3B (1932-1935)	NY 3 / NY 271 in Middleport	NY 19 near Medina	ca. 1932	ca. 1935
NY 3C (1930-1932)	NY 3 in Sterling	US 11 / NY 3 / NY 12 in Watertown	1930	ca. 1932
NY 3C (1932-1935)	NY 237 in Clarendon	NY 3 / NY 63 in Sweden	ca. 1932	ca. 1935
NY 3D (1931-1932)	NY 3 in New Haven	NY 3C in Mexico	ca. 1931	ca. 1932
NY 3D (1932-1935)	NY 3 in Sterling	US 11 / NY 3 / NY 12 in Watertown	ca. 1932	1935
NY 3E (1930-1932)	NY 3 in Red Creek	NY 3 in Oswego	1930	ca. 1932
NY 3E (1932-1935)	NY 3 in New Haven	NY 3D in Mexico	ca. 1932	1935
NY 3F (1931-1932)	NY 3 in Deferiet	NY 26 in Carthage	ca. 1931	ca. 1932
NY 3F (1932-1935)	NY 3 in Red Creek	NY 3 in Oswego	ca. 1932	1935
NY 3G	NY 3 in Deferiet	NY 3 in Wilna	ca. 1932	1940s
NY 4 (1924-1927)	Pennsylvania state line at Lindley	NY 3 in Rochester	1924	1927
NY 5A (1924-mid-1920s)	NY 5 in Buffalo	NY 5 in Albany	1924	mid-1920s
NY 5A (1933-1937)	US 20 / NY 5 in Aurelius	NY 5 in Sennett	ca. 1933	ca. 1937
NY 6 (1924-1927)	New York City line	Canadian border at Rouses Point	1924	1927
NY 6A	US 9 in Yonkers	US 9 in Tarrytown	mid-1920s	1930
NY 6B	NY 5 in East Greenbush	NY 6 in Waterford	mid-1920s	1927
NY 7 (1924-mid-1920s)	NY 6 in Troy	MA 7 at the Massachusetts state line at Stephentown	1924	mid-1920s
NY 7 (mid-1920s-1927)	NY 5 in Albany	NY 5 in Buffalo	mid-1920s	1927
NY 7B (1930-1970)	NY 7 in Unadilla	NY 7 / NY 28 in Oneonta	1930	1970
NY 7C	NY 7 in Niskayuna	NY 7 in Colonie	ca. 1961	late 1960s
NY 8 (1924-1930)	NJ 8 at the New Jersey state line at Minisink	US 9W in Newburgh	1924	1930
NY 9 (1924-1927)	NY 17 in Binghamton	Vermont state line at Hoosick	1924	1927
NY 9C (1920s-1930)	US 9 in Albany	US 9 in Round Lake	1920s	1930
NY 9C (1930-early 1930s)	NY 129 in Croton-on-Hudson	US 9 in Peekskill	1930	early 1930s
NY 9E	US 9 in Wappingers Falls	NY 376 in Wappinger	ca. 1933	ca. 1939
NY 9F	US 9 in Poughkeepsie	US 9 in Rhinebeck	1930	ca. 1938
NY 9K	US 9 / NY 50 in Saratoga Springs	US 9 in Lake George	1930	early 1950s
NY 9M	NY 8 in Horicon	US 9 in Chester	ca. 1931	ca. 1939
NY 9W (1927-1930)	US 9 in Elizabethtown	US 9 in Keeseville	1927	1930
NY 9X (1931-1936)	US 9 in Malta	US 9 / NY 50 in Saratoga Springs	ca. 1931	1935
NY 9X	US 9 in Manhattan	US 9 in The Bronx	1935	1940s
NY 10A (1920s-1930)	NY 10 in Long Lake	NY 10 in Johnsburg	late 1920s	1930
NY 11 (1924-1927)	NY 2 in Mexico	NY 5 / NY 12 in Utica	1924	1927
NY 12A (1928-1930)	NY 12 in Sherburne	NY 5 in New Hartford	1928	1930
NY 12C	NY 5 / NY 5S / NY 8 / NY 12 in Utica	NY 12 / NY 28 / NY 287 in Barneveld	1930	1970
NY 15 (1924-1939)	NY 17 / NY 17C in Owego	NY 33 / NY 35 in Rochester	1924	ca. 1939
NY 15A (1930-1939)	NY 15 in Interlaken	US 20 / NY 5 in Waterloo	1930	ca. 1939
NY 16A	PA 646 at the Pennsylvania state line at Allegany	NY 16 / NY 17 in Olean	ca. 1932	1962
NY 16B	NY 16 in West Seneca	NY 16 in West Seneca	ca. 1932	unknown
NY 17A (1920s-1930)	NY 17 in Randolph	NY 17 / NY 18 in Salamanca	mid-1920s	1930
NY 17D	NY 17 in Elmira	Pennsylvania state line at Chemung	1930	early 1940s
NY 17E	NY 17 in Corning	NY 17 in Elmira	1930	mid-1960s
NY 17F	NY 17 in Andover	NY 17 in Addison	1930	early 1940s
NY 17G	NY 19 in Willing	NY 17 / NY 248 in Greenwood	1930	early 1940s
NY 17H (1930-1937)	NY 17 in Randolph	NY 17 / NY 18 in Salamanca	1930	ca. 1937
NY 17H (1940s-1970s)	NY 17C in Johnson City	NY 17 in Binghamton	by 1940	1970s
NY 17J	NY 17 / NY 430 in Mayville	NY 17 in Jamestown	1930	1973
NY 18A	US 62 / NY 18 / NY 39 in Collins	US 62 / NY 18 in Eden	1930	1962
NY 18B	NY 240 in Orchard Park	US 62 / NY 18 / NY 324 in Amherst	ca. 1935	1962
NY 18C	NY 78 / NY 278 on Orchard Park – West Seneca town line	NY 35 / NY 78 in Depew	ca. 1932	ca. 1938
NY 18D	Whirlpool Rapids Bridge at Niagara Falls	US 62 / NY 18 in Wheatfield	ca. 1932	1962
NY 18E	Queenston–Lewiston Bridge at Lewiston	NY 18F in Lewiston	early 1930s	early 1960s
NY 18F (1934-1938)	NY 18 in Little Valley	NY 18 near Cattaraugus	ca. 1934	ca. 1938
NY 19 (1924-1930)	NY 23 in Roxbury	US 6N in Kingston	1924	1930
NY 20 (1924-1927)	NY 2 in Syracuse	NY 3 in Oswego	1924	1927
NY 20A (1930-1932)	Pennsylvania state line at Ripley	US 20 in Silver Creek	1930	ca. 1932
NY 20A (1938-1939)	US 20 in Hamburg	US 20 / NY 5 in Avon	ca. 1938	ca. 1939
NY 20B	US 20 in Brant	US 20 in Hamburg	1930	ca. 1932
NY 20C	NY 64 in Bloomfield	US 20 / NY 5 / NY 64 in Bloomfield	ca. 1931	1997
NY 20D	US 20 in Geneseo	NY 5 in Avon	ca. 1931	ca. 1938
NY 20N	US 20 / NY 174 in Marcellus town	US 20 / NY 20SY / NY 92 in Cazenovia	1937	1961
NY 20SY	US 20 / NY 321 in Skaneateles	US 20 / NY 20N / NY 92 in Cazenovia	1951	1961
NY 21 (1924-1930)	US 9 in Poughkeepsie	CT 4 at the Connecticut state line at Amenia	1924	1930
NY 21A	Vine Valley	US 20 / NY 5 in Canandaigua	1930	early 1940s
NY 24 (1924-1930)	NY 45 in Stephentown	NY 30 in Fort Ann	1924	1930
NY 24A	NY 24 / NY 25 in Queens	NY 110 in East Farmingdale	late 1950s	ca. 1962
NY 25C	NY 25 in Queens	NY 25 in Garden City Park	by 1940	1970
NY 25D	NY 24 / NY 25 in Queens	NY 25 in Westbury	early 1930s	1958
