= Niagara Falls International Airport =

Airport in Western New York State, United States

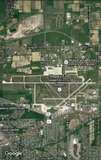
- IATA: IAG; ICAO: KIAG; FAA LID: IAG

Summary
- Airport type: Public / military
- Owner/Operator: Niagara Frontier Transportation Authority
- Serves: Buffalo–Niagara Falls metropolitan area
- Location: Town of Niagara, Town of Wheatfield, Niagara County, near Niagara Falls, New York
- Elevation AMSL: 592 ft (180 m)
- Coordinates: 43°06′26″N 78°56′46″W
- Website: www.niagarafallsairport.com

Maps
- FAA airport diagram
- Interactive map of Niagara Falls International Airport

Runways
Direction	Length		Surface
Direction	ft	m	Surface
06/24	5,189	1,582	Asphalt
10/28	9,829	2,996	Asphalt/Concrete

Statistics (2017)
- Aircraft operations: 29,816
- Passengers: 282,000
- Aircraft operations data for 2011; Sources: Federal Aviation Administration, NFTA Press Release, Bureau of Transportation Statistics

Niagara Falls International Airport (IATA: IAG, ICAO: KIAG, FAA LID: IAG) is located 4 mi (6.4 km) east of downtown Niagara Falls, in the Town of Niagara in Niagara County, New York, United States. Owned and operated by the Niagara Frontier Transportation Authority, the airport is a joint civil-military airfield and shares its runways with the Niagara Falls Air Reserve Station. A new terminal building opened in 2009. It is notable for serving vastly more Canadian passengers from over the nearby border than Americans.

== History ==
Niagara Falls International Airport opened in 1928 as a municipal airport with four crushed-stone runways.

During World War II, Bell Aircraft established a large manufacturing plant next to the airport, where during the war it built over 10,000 P-39 Airacobras and P-63 Kingcobras. Bell employed over 28,000 at the plant. After the war, the plant was the development site of the Bell X-1 used by Chuck Yeager to break the sound barrier in 1947.

The United States Army Air Forces assumed jurisdiction of the airport during the war, with the 3522d Army Air Force Base Unit managing the airport and coordinating use of the airfield with Bell Aircraft. The airfield was improved with macadam runways, 4000x150 (N/S), 4000x150 (NE/SW), 4200x300 (E/W), 4000x150 (NW/SE), and added many taxiways and other improvements to handle large numbers of aircraft. Air Technical Service Command also operated an aircraft modification center at the airport where new aircraft were given various updates prior to their deployment to operational bases and overseas combat theaters.

Civilian aviation operations and jurisdiction of the airport was returned in early 1946, and a joint-use agreement was made with the United States Air Force for Air Force Reserve and New York Air National Guard use of a portion of the airport.

Today, the Niagara Falls Air Reserve Station is home to the Air Force Reserve Command's 914th Air Refueling Wing (914 ARW), flying the KC-135R Stratotanker. The wing is operationally gained by the Air Mobility Command (AMC). The main runway was extended to over 9,000 feet (2,743 m) in 1959 to handle larger military aircraft, and was extended again in 2003 to its current length of 9,829 feet (2,996 m). For all practical purposes, the facility is a small Air Force base.

In November 2013 Calspan Air Services became the fixed-base operator for the airport, including refueling, ramp assistance, deicing, transportation and maintenance services.

On August 4, 2014, an Air France Boeing 747-428 flight AF356 from Paris Charles-de-Gaulle was diverted into the airport instead of landing in Toronto due to the temporary closing of Toronto Pearson International Airport. Landing and take-off were on Runway 28R. Niagara Falls gets a large number of Toronto's diversions due to its location and long runways.

=== Airlines ===
American Airlines served Niagara Falls until 1956. From 1982 to 1984, Air Niagara, a post-deregulation airline, flew to Newark Airport (EWR) and Kennedy Airport (JFK) with Boeing 727-100 jetliners. Empire Airlines also served the airport during the mid-1980's, flying to Syracuse, Long Island, Utica, Elmira, and Boston using both the Fokker F28 Fellowship jets and Fairchild Swearingen Metroliner commuter propjets. Kiwi International Air Lines briefly served the airport in 1998 with nonstop Boeing 727-200 jet service to Newark Airport (EWR).

In March 2007, Direct Air initiated nonstop jet service to Myrtle Beach; Direct Air began jet flights to Palm Beach International Airport in November 2010. Direct Air's flights to Lakeland Linder International Airport in Lakeland, Florida, started in 2011. All Direct Air service at Niagara Falls International Airport ended on March 12, 2012.

In September 2009, a new terminal complex was completed.

Allegiant Airlines began jet service in December 2009. They currently serve Punta Gorda (FL), Orlando-Sanford, and St. Petersburg-Clearwater.

In December 2010, Vision Airlines began jet service on behalf of People Express Airlines (2010s) to Fort Lauderdale–Hollywood International Airport. According to a USA Today news article dated September 26, 2014, Vision Airlines d/b/a People Express no longer operates any scheduled passenger service.

In January 2011, Spirit Airlines started jet flights from Niagara Falls International Airport.

In the summer of 2020, due to the COVID-19 pandemic and low passenger numbers, Allegiant Airlines ended flights to Savannah.

In October 2020, Spirit Airlines suspended all of their flights from Niagara Falls International Airport. In March 2020, Spirit suspended their flights to Fort Lauderdale. In April, seasonal service to Myrtle Beach began for the season as scheduled. This service was downgraded from the usual Airbus A320, to an Airbus A319. On June 14, service to Myrtle Beach was suspended and service to Fort Lauderdale began again. On June 20, flights to Fort Lauderdale were being operated direct instead of via Plattsburgh. On June 30, flights to Fort Lauderdale were suspended again. Flights to Myrtle Beach resumed on July 6. August 31 marked the day that Spirit suspended all flights and said they would be pulling out of the airport entirely in October. Flights to Fort Lauderdale resumed again for the final time in September on the A320/A320neo. After nine years of service, the final Spirit Airlines flight to Niagara Falls was on October 6 of that year.

== Facilities ==
The airport is in Class D airspace and has a FAA control tower.

The airport covers 1,067 acres (432 ha) and has two paved runways:

- 6/24: 5,189 x 150 ft (1,582 x 46 m), surface: asphalt
- 10/28: 9,829 x 150 ft (2,996 x 46 m), surface: asphalt/concrete

=== Terminal ===
On September 2, 2009, Niagara Falls International Airport dedicated its new two-story terminal. It has four gates (two jetways and two ground-loading gates) and is capable of accommodating Boeing 747 aircraft. The exterior is designed to reflect Niagara Falls' water flow. The terminal costed $31.5 million to build and was a part of the $42.5 million NFIA Improvement Project, which included $11 million in runway apron and landside improvements.

The previous (old) terminal is now occupied by the Niagara Aerospace Museum, also known as the Ira G. Ross Aerospace Museum.

== Airlines and destinations ==
=== Passenger ===
Airlines	Destinations
Allegiant Air	Orlando/Sanford, Punta Gorda (FL), St. Petersburg/Clearwater; Seasonal: Myrtle Beach

== Statistics ==
=== Top destinations ===
Busiest domestic routes from IAG (February 2025 – January 2026)
Rank	Airport	Passengers	Carriers
1	Punta Gorda, Florida	32,660	Allegiant
2	St. Petersburg, Florida	20,300	Allegiant
3	Orlando-Sanford, Florida	10,320	Allegiant
4	Myrtle Beach, South Carolina	5,010	Allegiant

== See also ==
- List of airports in New York
