= List of former state routes in New York (51–100) =

This section of the list of former state routes in New York contains all routes numbered between 51 and 100.

Route	Southern or western terminus	Northern or eastern terminus	Formed	Removed
NY 51 (1920s-1930)	NY 17 in Deposit	NY 23 in Stamford	mid-1920s	1930
NY 52 (1920s-1930)	NY 36 in Dansville	NY 14 near Geneva city	mid-1920s	1930
NY 53 (1920s-1930)	NY 13 in Horseheads	NY 15 in Candor	mid-1920s	1930
NY 54 (1920s-1930)	NY 5 / NY 12 in Utica	NY 5 in Fonda	mid-1920s	1930
NY 55 (1920s-1930)	New Jersey state line near Greenwood Lake	NY 17 in Goshen	late 1920s	1930
NY 56A	US 11 in Potsdam	NY 56 in Norfolk	1930	1980
NY 57	US 11 in Syracuse	NY 104 in Oswego	1927	1982
NY 58 (1920s-1930)	NY 17 in Harriman	NY 10 in Newburgh	mid-1920s	1930
NY 59A	NY 304 in Clarkstown	NY 59 in Clarkstown	1956	late 1950s
NY 61 (1920s-1934)	NY 59 in Suffern	US 9W in West Haverstraw	late 1920s	1934
NY 61 (1934-1940s)	NY 129 at Croton Reservoir	US 9 in Peekskill	1934	late 1940s
NY 62 (1920s-1930)	NY 17 in Amity	Lake Ontario shoreline in Yates	mid-1920s	1930
NY 62 (1930-1932)	NY 98 in Great Valley	NY 18 in Buffalo	1930	ca. 1932
NY 62A	NY 104 in Niagara Falls	US 62 in Niagara Falls	1970s	2006
NY 63A	NY 63 in Angelica	NY 63 in Nunda	1930	early 1940s
NY 64 (1920s-1930)	NY 51 in Delhi	NY 7 in Oneonta	mid-1920s	1930
NY 70 (1920s-1930)	US 11 in Homer	US 20 in Skaneateles	mid-1920s	1930
NY 70A	NY 70 in Burns	NY 36 in Dansville	ca. 1931	mid-1970s
NY 72 (1920s-1930)	NY 52 in Naples	Lake Road in Pultneyville	mid-1920s	1930
NY 72A	NY 56 in Potsdam	NY 72 in Hopkinton	1930	early 1940s
NY 74 (1920s-1930)	US 20 in Sheldon	Roosevelt Highway in Carlton	mid-1920s	1930
NY 74 (1930-1973)	Pennsylvania state line at French Creek	NY 17J near Lakewood	1930	ca. 1973
NY 75 (1930-1932)	NY 426 in Mina	NY 17 / NY 17J in Mayville	1930	ca. 1932
NY 76 (1927-1930)	US 11 in Mexico	NY 5 / NY 12 / NY 28 in Utica	1927	1930
NY 77A	Tonawanda Indian Reservation boundary in Alabama	NY 77 in Alabama	ca. 1935	late 1930s
NY 78 (1927-1930)	NY 14 in Watkins Glen	US 20 / NY 5 near Geneva	ca. 1927	1930
NY 78A	NY 78 in East Aurora	NY 35 in Lancaster	ca. 1932	ca. 1938
NY 82A	US 44 in Amenia	NY 82 in Pine Plains	1930	1980
NY 84	NJ 84 at the New Jersey state line at Minisink	NY 17K in Montgomery	1930	1966
NY 86A	NY 86 in Lake Placid	US 9 in Elizabethtown	1930	1952
NY 87	US 11 in De Kalb	NY 37 in Ogdensburg	1930	1978
NY 89A	US 20 / NY 5 in Seneca Falls	NY 89 in Tyre	early 1950s	late 1950s
NY 94 (1930-early 1940s)	NY 17 in Portville	NY 19 in Belfast	1930	early 1940s
NY 94 (early 1940s-1949)	New Jersey state line at Chestnut Ridge	US 202 in Haverstraw	early 1940s	1949
NY 96 (1930-early 1940s)	US 4 / NY 7 in Troy	MA 2 at the Massachusetts state line at Petersburgh	1930	early 1940s
NY 99	NY 30 in Duane	NY 3 in Franklin	1930	1994
