= List of former state routes in New York (401–500) =

This section of the list of former state routes in New York contains all routes numbered above 401. To date, New York State Route 456 is the highest numbered former state route in New York.

Route	Southern or western terminus	Northern or eastern terminus	Formed	Removed
NY 401 (1930s-1950s)	US 9 in Stockport	NY 9H in Ghent	1930s	early 1950s
NY 401 (1970-1973)	NY 36 in Dansville	NY 21 near Wayland village	1970	ca. 1973
NY 402	Ferry landing in Tivoli	NY 9G in Tivoli	early 1930s	1980
NY 404 (1933-1940s)	NY 100 in Briarcliff Manor	US 9 near Ossining	1933	late 1940s
NY 405	US 4 in North Greenbush	NY 66 in Troy	early 1970s	1980
NY 407	NY 159 in Duanesburg	NY 160 in Florida	ca. 1931	1981
NY 408 (1930-1938)	NY 86 in Harrietstown	NY 192 in Brighton	1930	ca. 1938
NY 408A	NY 408 near Angelica village	NY 351 / NY 408 in Nunda	early 1940s	1949
NY 409 (1930-1938)	NY 3 in Hounsfield	NY 12E in Hounsfield	1930	ca. 1938
NY 413	Forks Road in Plainfield	US 20 in Plainfield	ca. 1931	early 1950s
NY 415 (1930-mid-1960s)	NY 290 in East Syracuse	NY 298 in Collamer	1930	mid-1960s
NY 417 (1932-1950s)	NY 7 in Otego	Otego	ca. 1932	mid-1950s
NY 419 (1933-1935)	NY 29 east of Schuylerville	US 4 north of Schuylerville	ca. 1933	ca. 1935
NY 422	NY 16 / NY 78 in Elma	NY 358 in Marilla	ca. 1931	1980
NY 424	NY 380 in Stockton	NY 60 in Cassadaga	1930	1980
NY 427 (1931-1938)	NY 9N in Keene	US 9 in Elizabethtown	ca. 1931	ca. 1938
NY 428	NY 39 in Forestville	US 20 in Silver Creek	ca. 1932	1980
NY 432 (1935-1940)	NY 22 in Canaan	Massachusetts state line at Canaan	ca. 1935	1940
NY 432	Myers Creek in Rathbone	NY 417 in Addison	early 1940s	1998
NY 433 (1937-1940)	NY 30 in Middleburgh	NY 7 in Cobleskill	ca. 1937	ca. 1940
NY 433 (1950s-1960s)	NY 5 in Syracuse	NY 298 in Salina	early 1950s	mid-1960s
NY 434 (1940s)	NY 23 in Plymouth	NY 12 in North Norwich	ca. 1940	early 1940s
NY 435	NY 167 in Manheim	NY 5 in Manheim	ca. 1940	early 1940s
NY 436 (1950s-1960s)	NY 433 in DeWitt	Carrier Circle in DeWitt	early 1950s	mid-1960s
NY 439	NJ 439 at the New Jersey state line at Staten Island	St. George ferry landing on Staten Island	1949	ca. 1968
NY 439A	NY 440 on Staten Island	NY 439 on Staten Island	late 1940s	ca. 1968
NY 456	NY 22 in Beekmantown	US 9 in Beekmantown	1970	2015
