= Sal Maglie Stadium =

Stadium in Niagara Falls, New York, US

Coordinates: 43.100317°N 79.024948°W

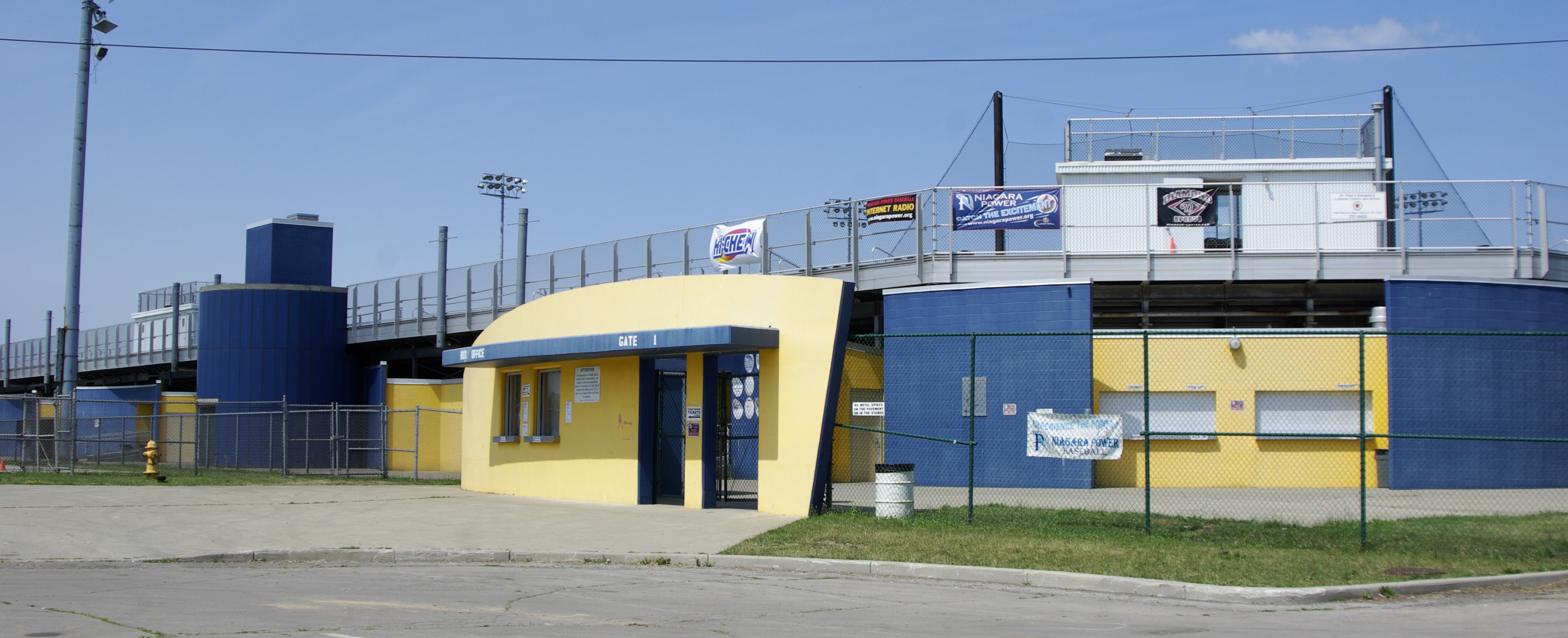
- Interactive map of Sal Maglie Stadium
- Former names: Hyde Park Stadium (1939-1983)
- Location: 1200 Hyde Park Blvd. Niagara Falls, NY 14301
- Capacity: 4,000

Construction
- Built: 1936
- Opened: 1939

Tenant
- Niagara Falls Americans

Sal Maglie Stadium is a stadium in Niagara Falls, New York. It is primarily used for baseball and is currently the home of the Niagara Falls Americans (PGCBL) baseball team.

The ballpark has a capacity of 4,000 people and opened in 1939. Its original name was simply Hyde Park Stadium, and was originally designed primarily for football. It was adapted for baseball in the 1950s and was rebuilt as a proper baseball facility in 1999. In mid-season 1983 it was renamed for Niagara Falls native and former major league player Sal Maglie, who played college ball for Niagara.

Professional clubs occupying the site over the years included the Buffalo Bisons (1967–1968), of the International League, as a temporary escape from the deteriorating War Memorial Stadium in Buffalo; the Niagara Falls Pirates (1970–1979), later called Niagara Falls Sox (1982–1985), Tigers (1989) and Rapids (1989–1993), of the New York–Penn League; and Mallards (1995), of the North Atlantic League. The stadium is now home to the Niagara University Purple Eagles Club Baseball team. In the team's first year at the stadium, they won their division title (going 15–2).

Sal Maglie Stadium is located within Hyde Park, on the east side of Hyde Park Boulevard. Robbins Drive bounds the ballpark on the east (right field) side and crosses Gill Creek, which forms the south (first base) boundary of the grounds. Beyond left field are softball and little league diamonds and Linwood Avenue.

In 2023, the city of Niagara Falls struck agreements with Niagara County Community College and D'Youville University to host their college baseball squads at the facility beginning with the 2024 season. The agreement also calls for the two colleges to establish "nine-week fall ball sessions" beginning in fall 2023 in an effort to make the stadium a "year-round destination."

== See also ==
- List of NCAA Division I baseball venues
