= Sanborn, New York =

Hamlet in New York, United States

Coordinates: 43°08′12″N 78°53′05″W

Location in Niagara County and the state of New York

Sanborn is a hamlet (and census-designated place) in the Towns of Cambria and Lewiston in Niagara County, New York, United States, on the southern side of the intersection of New York State Route 429 and New York State Route 31. As of the 2020 census, Sanborn had a population of 1,553. Originally called South Pekin after the formerly thriving hamlet of Pekin to the north, Sanborn was renamed in 1866 after Ebenezer Sanborn. The ZIP code for Sanborn is 14132.

Sanborn is the home of SUNY Niagara.

== Points of interest ==
- St. Andrews Lutheran Cemetery
- St. Peter's Lutheran Church and School
- Niagara Escarpment, from which one can sometimes view Lake Ontario and Toronto.

== Notable people ==
- Nellie Moyer Budd, music teacher
- Tom McCollum, NHL goaltender
- Merv Treichler (born 1944), Hall of Fame auto racing driver
