= Saint Johnsburg, New York =

Hamlet in New York, United States

Coordinates: 43°05′19″N 78°53′23″W

St. Johnsburg is a hamlet in the town of Wheatfield in Niagara County, New York, United States.
