= Hyde Park (Niagara Falls, New York) =

Municipal park in Niagara Falls, New York

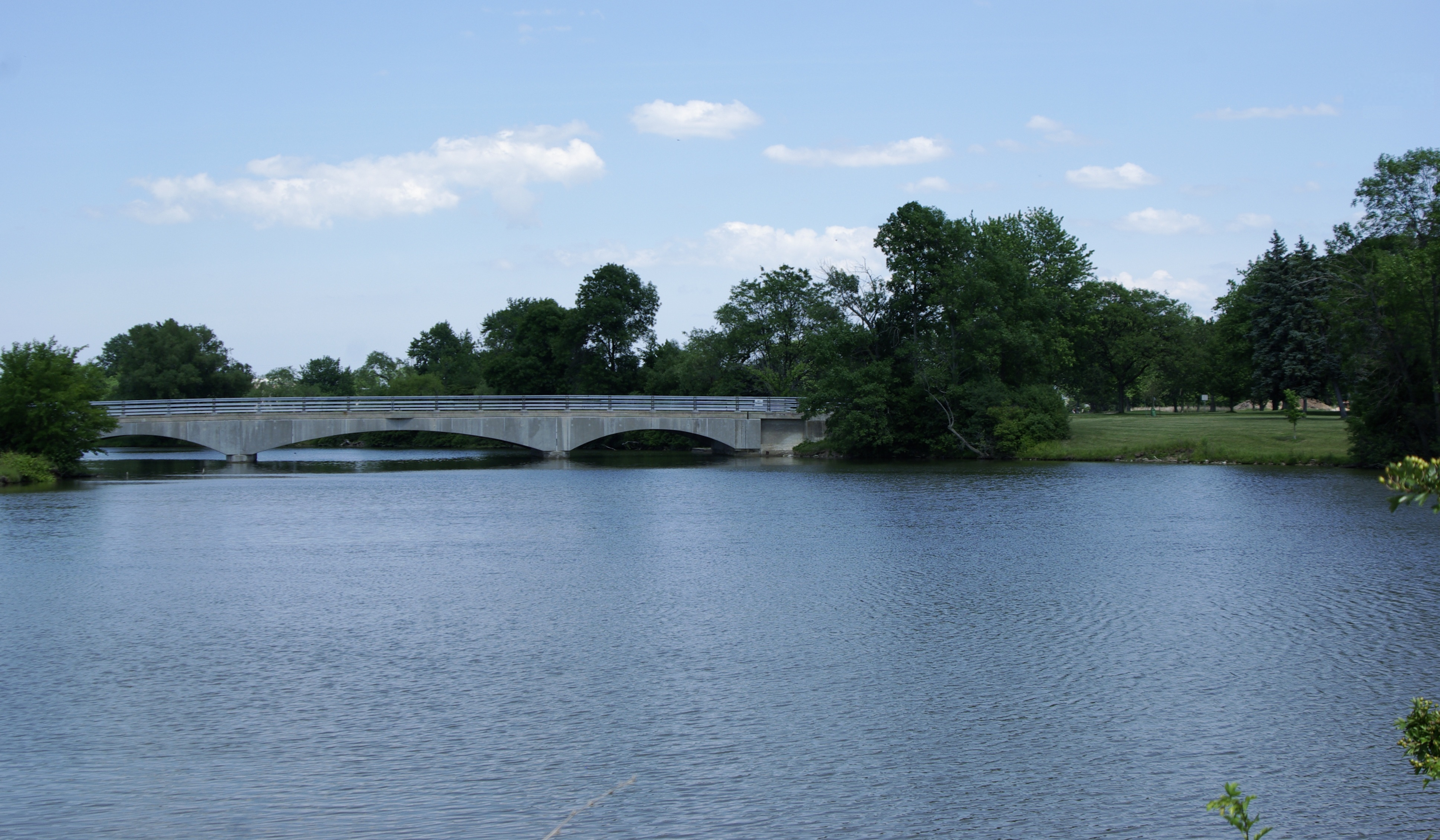
- Hyde Park Lake

- Location within New York
- Type: Municipal park
- Location: Hyde Park Boulevard, Niagara Falls, New York
- Coordinates: 43°06′13″N 79°01′02″W
- Operator: Niagara Falls Department of Public Works and Parks

Hyde Park is a municipal park in Niagara Falls, New York. It is the largest city park in New York outside of Manhattan, and is located along Hyde Park Boulevard (NY 61).

== Park facilities ==
The park contains a golf course, bocce, lawn bowling, tennis and baseball. The largest structure in the park is Sal Maglie Stadium, named for Niagara Falls native and professional baseball player Sal Maglie. The park also features picnic pavilions, an Olympic-sized swimming pool, a rose garden, Hyde Park Lake (which is annually stocked with trout), and the Hyde Park Ice Pavilion. It is located in the geographic center of Niagara Falls.

== History ==
Hyde Park was the brainchild of Charles B. Hyde, the owner of a paper company at the corner of Hyde Park Boulevard (then known as Sugar Street) and Pine Avenue. When he sold the paper company and retired, he bought a large tract of land on what was then the outskirts of the city. In 1921, he suffered a stroke and died. By that time, he had willed the land to the city for use as a park. A year later, additional land was purchased, and the city began to build the park.

In the 1930s, a dam was built across Gill Creek, which flooded swampland and created Hyde Park Lake. In 1928, the Niagara Falls Power Company donated 58 acres (23 ha) to the park. The company donated additional land in 1943.

Sal Maglie Stadium was originally built in 1936 as a Works Progress Administration project during the Great Depression and dedicated by U.S. President Franklin D. Roosevelt. Originally known as Hyde Park Stadium, it was built as a multi-purpose facility. In the 1980s, the stadium was renamed Sal Maglie Stadium to honor the Major League Baseball player who had grown up in Niagara Falls. In 1998, it was demolished and rebuilt as a facility designed only for baseball.
