= List of U.S. Routes in New York =

- Standard U.S. Route shields in New York

Highway names
- Interstates: Interstate X (I-X)
- US Highways: U.S. Route X (US X)
- State: New York State Route X (NY X)

System links
- New York Highways; Interstate; US; State; Reference; Parkways

There are currently 16 U.S. Routes—14 mainline routes and two official special routes—that exist entirely or partially in New York. In New York, U.S. Routes are mostly maintained by the New York State Department of Transportation (NYSDOT), with some exceptions. U.S. Routes in New York are generally directly referenced by NYSDOT with their number; however, the letter "U" is suffixed to the number of the route on reference markers and in internal documents if there is numerical duplication between a U.S. Route and a state route. Two such numerical duplications exist: U.S. Route 2 and New York State Route 2 (US 2 and NY 2; inventoried as "2U" and "2", respectively), and US 15 and NY 15 ("15U" and "15").

The "From" column indicates the southern or western terminus of the route; likewise, the "To" column indicates the northern or eastern terminus of the route. The "mi" and "km" columns give the length of the route in miles and kilometers, respectively. Designations that are shaded in dark gray are numbers not currently assigned to a highway.

== Mainline routes ==
Number	Length (mi)	Length (km)	Southern or western terminus	Northern or eastern terminus	Formed	Removed	Notes
US 1	21.51	34.62	I-95/US 1/US 9/US 46 at the New Jersey line in Manhattan	US 1 at the Connecticut line at Port Chester	1926	current	US 1 crosses the Hudson River from New Jersey via the George Washington Bridge and follows the Cross Bronx Expressway and the Boston Post Road through Manhattan, the Bronx and Westchester County to the Connecticut state line at Port Chester.
US 2	0.87	1.40	US 11 in Rouses Point	US 2 at the Vermont line at Rouses Point	1930	current	US 2 begins at US 11 in Rouses Point and crosses into Vermont while traversing the Richelieu River.
US 4	79.68	128.23	US 9/US 20 in East Greenbush	US 4 at the Vermont state line at Hampton	1926	current	US 4 begins at US 9 and US 20 in East Greenbush and follows the Hudson River north through Troy, Mechanicville, and Schuylerville to Hudson Falls. At Hudson Falls, the route breaks from the river and proceeds northeastward along the Champlain Canal to Whitehall, from where US 4 continues eastward to Fair Haven, Vermont.
US 6	77.76	125.14	US 6/US 209 at the Pennsylvania line at Port Jervis	US 6/US 202 at the Connecticut line at Southeast	1927	current	US 6 enters and leaves New York in close proximity to I-84; however, US 6 follows a more circuitous route to the south between Middletown and Carmel via Peekskill. The route has overlaps with NY 17 and US 202 and crosses the Hudson River on the Bear Mountain Bridge.
US 6N	—	—	US 6 in Port Jervis	US 9W in Kingston	1928	1933	US 6N was a spur of US 6 that connected US 6 in Port Jervis to US 9W in Kingston. It became part of US 209 c. 1935.
US 7	—	—	New York City line at Mount Vernon	US 7/US 44 at the Connecticut line at Amenia	1926	1929	The original plans for US 7 had the route entering New York at Amenia and following modern US 44 and NY 22 south to New York City. The route was reconfigured by 1929 to bypass New York to the east.
US 9	324.71	522.57	I-95/US 1/US 9/US 46 at the New Jersey line at Manhattan	I-87 in Champlain	1926	current	US 9 enters New York on the George Washington Bridge and follows the Hudson River from New York City to Albany, passing through Peekskill, Poughkeepsie, and Hudson along the way. North of Albany, US 9 follows I-87 through the northeastern counties of New York to Champlain, where it ends at I-87 about 1 mile (1.6 km) south of the Canadian border.
US 9E	—	—	New York City line at Yonkers	US 9/US 9W in Waterford	1927	1930	US 9E was the designation ultimately assigned to the proposed US 109 from New York City to Waterford. At Waterford, US 9E merged with US 9W to become US 9. Most of US 9E was absorbed by an extended US 9 in 1930.
US 9W	129.86	208.99	US 9W at the New Jersey line at Orangetown	US 9 in Albany	1927	current	US 9W follows the west bank of the Hudson River from New Jersey to Albany, where it ends at US 9. The route serves several riverside locations, namely Newburgh, Kingston, and Catskill. The portion of the route north of Kingston closely parallels the New York State Thruway (I-87).
US 11	318.83	513.11	US 11 at the Pennsylvania line at Kirkwood	Canadian border at Rouses Point	1926	current	US 11 parallels I-81 northward through the Central New York cities of Binghamton, Cortland, and Syracuse to Watertown, where it turns northeastward to pass through the northern portion of the North Country. The route ends at the Canadian border in Rouses Point, where it continues into Canada as Quebec Route 223.
US 15	12.89	20.74	I-99/US 15 at the Pennsylvania line at Lindley	I-86/US 15/NY 17 in Painted Post originally Rochester	c. 1939	current	US 15 follows a generally northerly alignment through southeastern Steuben County from Lawrenceville, Pennsylvania, to Painted Post, where it ends at an interchange with I-86. It formerly extended north along NY 15 and NY 415 to Rochester, where it ended. It was truncated in 1974 to end at I-86. All of US 15 between I-86 and Pennsylvania is signed concurrently with Interstate 99.
US 20	371.99	598.66	US 20 at the Pennsylvania line at Ripley	US 20 at the Massachusetts line at New Lebanon	1926	current	US 20 extends across the entire state, from Ripley in the west to New Lebanon in the east. It passes through Buffalo and Albany and serves several smaller cities in the Finger Lakes region, where US 20 has a lengthy overlap with NY 5.
US 44	65.62	105.61	US 209 in Wawarsing	US 44 at the Connecticut line at Millerton	c. 1935	current	US 44 begins at US 209 near Kerhonkson, a hamlet in the town of Wawarsing, and travels eastward across the state to Millerton. The route is concurrent with NY 55 from US 209 to Poughkeepsie, where both routes cross the Hudson River on the Mid-Hudson Bridge before splitting east of downtown.
US 62	102.86	165.54	US 62 at the Pennsylvania line at Frewsburg	NY 104 in Niagara Falls	c. 1932	current	US 62 traverses the westernmost counties of New York, indirectly serving Jamestown and directly serving Gowanda, Hamburg, and Buffalo. The route ends at NY 104 in downtown Niagara Falls.
US 104	167	269	US 62 in Niagara Falls	US 11 in Mexico	c. 1935	c. 1972	US 104 extended from the Rainbow Bridge in Niagara Falls to I-81 in the town of Mexico via Rochester and Oswego. The route was replaced with NY 104 c. 1972.
US 109	—	—	New York City line at Yonkers	US 9 in Glens Falls	1926	1927	US 109 was proposed in 1925 as a highway extending from New York City to US 9 in Glens Falls. It was partially designated as US 9E in 1927.
US 202	55.52	89.35	US 202 at the New Jersey line at Suffern	US 6/US 202 at the Connecticut line at Southeast	1934	current	US 202 heads northeast across downstate New York from Suffern to Southeast. Along the way, it passes through Peekskill and Brewster and crosses the Hudson River on the Bear Mountain Bridge.
US 209	60.98	98.14	US 6/US 209 at the Pennsylvania line at Port Jervis	US 9W in Kingston	c. 1935	current	US 209 enters New York at Port Jervis and heads generally northeasterly through Wurtsboro and Ellenville to Kingston, where it ends at an interchange with US 9W and NY 199.
US 219	67.57	108.74	US 219 at the Pennsylvania line at Limestone	I-90/New York State Thruway in West Seneca	1935	current	US 219 heads north–south through Cattaraugus and Erie Counties, serving Salamanca, Springville, and Buffalo. The portion of the route between Springville and its northern terminus at I-90 in West Seneca is a limited-access highway.
US 220	0.09	0.14	US 220 at the Pennsylvania line at Waverly	Chemung Street in Waverly	1926	2017	US 220 entered New York just north of I-86/NY 17 exit 60 in the village of Waverly and ended 0.09 miles (0.14 km) later at Chemung Street, the pre-Southern Tier Expressway routing of NY 17 through the village. Before US 220 was decommissioned in New York, the route was maintained by the village of Waverly.
US 309	0.09	0.14	US 220/US 309 at the Pennsylvania line at Waverly	Chemung Street in Waverly	1929	1963	US 309 followed Pennsylvania Avenue through Waverly to Chemung Street, then part of NY 17. All of US 309 in New York was concurrent with US 220.
Former

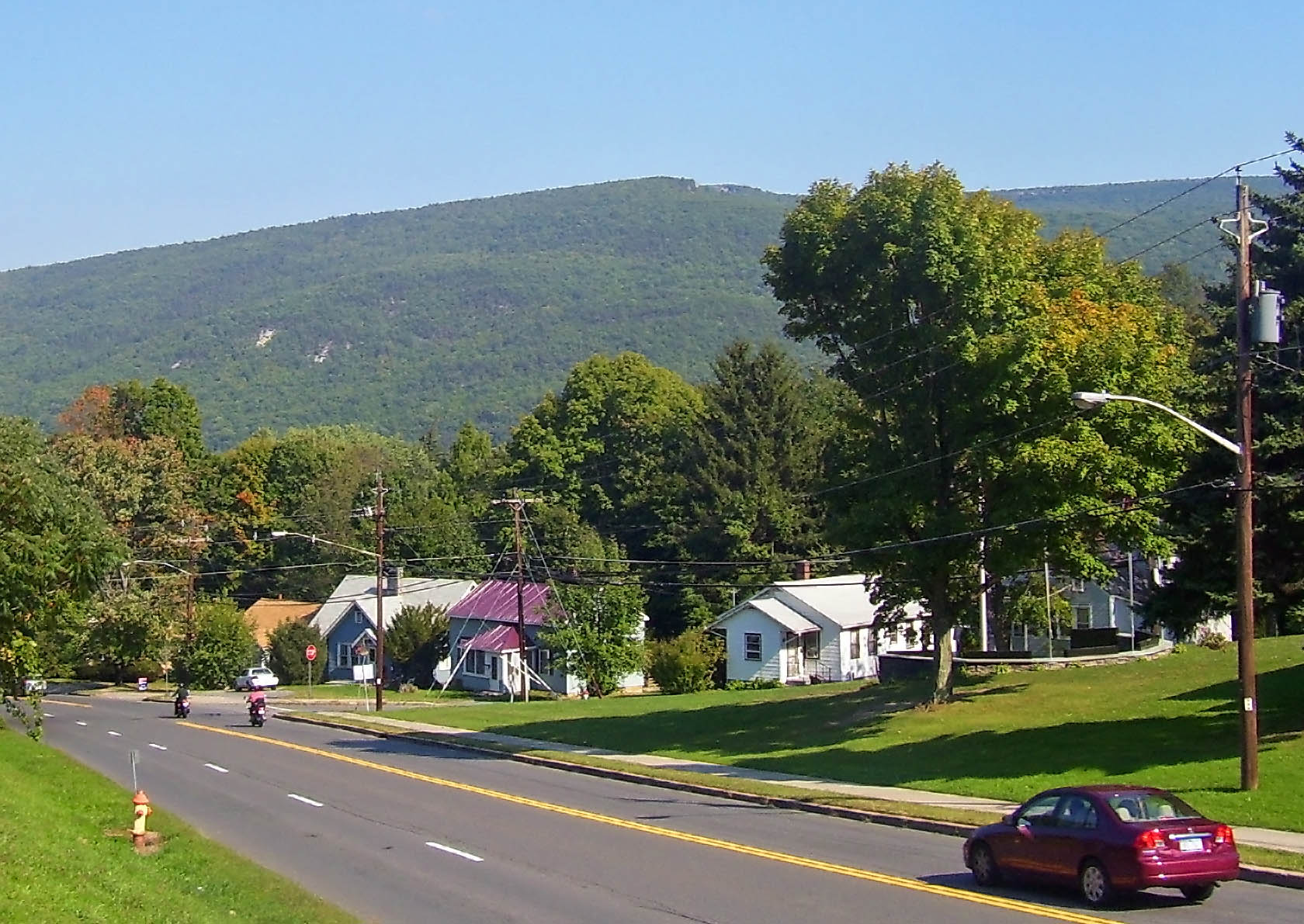
US 209 near Ellenville, NY

== Special routes ==
Number	Length (mi)	Length (km)	Southern or western terminus	Northern or eastern terminus	Formed	Removed	Notes
US 1A	—	—	—	—	—	—	Served Port Chester
US 9 Alt.	—	—	New York-New Jersey state line	Inwood Hill Park	—	—	
US 9W Alt.	—	—	—	—	—	—	Served Newburgh
US 9 Alt.	—	—	—	—	—	—	Served Rouses Point
US 20 Truck	—	—	—	—	—	—	Serves Silver Creek
US 20A	83.41	134.24	Hamburg	East Bloomfield	c. 1939	current	US 20A is a southerly alternate route of US 20 between Hamburg and East Bloomfield. Along the way, the route passes through the villages of East Aurora, Warsaw, and Geneseo.
US 62 Bus.	2.14	3.44	Niagara Falls	Niagara Falls	2006	current	US 62 Business follows Pine Avenue from NY 104 to US 62. The route connects US 62 to the Pine Avenue commercial district and Hyde Park, a large city park northeast of downtown. US 62 Business was formerly NY 62A.
US 104 Alt.	—	—	—	—	—	—	Served Niagara Falls
US 202 Alt.	—	—	—	—	—	—	Serves Philipstown

Unofficial special routes (those not formally recognized by the American Association of State Highway and Transportation Officials):

- U.S. Route 20 Truck (Silver Creek, New York)
- U.S. Route 219 Business (Salamanca, New York)
