= List of places in New York: J =

This list of current cities, towns, unincorporated communities, counties, and other recognized places in the U.S. state of New York also includes information on the number and names of counties in which the place lies, and its lower and upper zip code bounds, if applicable.

List of places in New York: A | B | C | D | E | F | G | H | I | J | K | L | M | N | O | P | Q | R | S | T | U | V | W | X | Y | Z

Name of place	Counties	Principal county	Lower zip code	Upper zip code
Jackson	1	Washington County		
Jacksonburg	1	Herkimer County	13407	
Jackson Corners	1	Dutchess County	12571	
Jackson Heights	1	Queens County	11372	
Jackson Summit	1	Fulton County	12117	
Jacksonville	1	Onondaga County	13135	
Jacksonville	1	Tompkins County	14854	
Jacks Reef	1	Onondaga County	13112	
Jamaica	1	Queens County	11401	60
Jamaica Square	1	Nassau County		
Jamesport	1	Suffolk County	11947	
Jamestown	1	Chautauqua County	14701	
Jamestown West	1	Chautauqua County		
Jamesville	1	Onondaga County	13078	
Jamison Road	1	Erie County		
Janesville	1	Schoharie County	12043	
Jaquins	1	Chautauqua County		
Jasper	1	Steuben County	14855	
Jasper	1	Steuben County		
Java	1	Wyoming County		
Java Center	1	Wyoming County	14082	
Java Lake	1	Wyoming County	14009	
Java Village	1	Wyoming County	14083	
Jay	1	Essex County	12941	
Jay	1	Essex County		
Jayville	1	St. Lawrence County		
Jeddo	1	Orleans County	14103	
Jefferson	1	Greene County	12414	
Jefferson	1	Schoharie County	12093	
Jefferson	1	Schoharie County		
Jefferson Heights	1	Greene County		
Jefferson Park	1	Jefferson County	13698	
Jefferson Valley	1	Westchester County	10535	
Jefferson Valley-Yorktown	1	Westchester County		
Jeffersonville	1	Sullivan County	12748	
Jenkinstown	1	Ulster County		
Jenksville	1	Tioga County	13736	
Jerden Falls	1	Lewis County		
Jericho	1	Clinton County	12910	
Jericho	1	Nassau County	11753	
Jericho	1	Suffolk County	11937	
Jericon Corners	1	Genesee County		
Jerome Avenue	1	Bronx County	10468	
Jerusalem	1	Clinton County		
Jerusalem Hill	1	Herkimer County		
Jersey Colony	1	Suffolk County	11971	
Jerusalem	1	Yates County		
Jerusalem Corners	1	Erie County	14047	
Jewell	1	Oneida County	13042	
Jewel Manor	1	Onondaga County	13088	
Jewett	1	Greene County	12444	
Jewett	1	Greene County		
Jewett Center	1	Greene County	12442	
Jewettville	1	Erie County	14170	
Jewettville	1	Jefferson County	13634	
Jockey Hill	1	Ulster County		
John F. Kennedy International Airport	1	Queens County	11430	
Johnsburg	1	Warren County	12843	
Johnsburg	1	Warren County		
Johnson	1	Orange County	10933	
Johnsonburg	1	Wyoming County	14167	
Johnson City	1	Broome County	13790	
Johnson Corners	1	Herkimer County		
Johnson Creek	1	Niagara County	14067	
Johnsonville	1	Rensselaer County	12094	
Johnstown	1	Fulton County	12095	
Johnstown	1	Fulton County		
Jones Beach	1	Onondaga County		
Jones Beach	1	Orleans County		
Jones Corners	1	Oswego County		
Jones Crossing	1	Otsego County		
Jones Point	1	Onondaga County		
Jones Point	1	Rockland County	10986	
Jonesville	1	Saratoga County	12065	
Jordan	1	Onondaga County	13080	
Jordanville	1	Herkimer County	13361	
Joscelyn	1	Sullivan County		
Joshua	1	Onondaga County		
Joy	1	Wayne County		
Juddville	1	Madison County		
Junction Boulevard	1	Queens County	11372	
Junius	1	Seneca County		
J. W. Johnson	1	New York County		
