= Buffalo–Niagara Falls metropolitan area =

- Metropolitan statistical area
- Buffalo–Cheektowaga, NY metropolitan statistical area
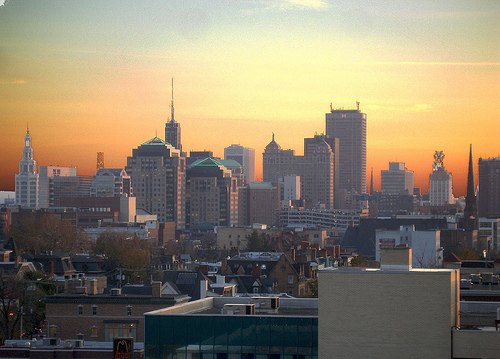
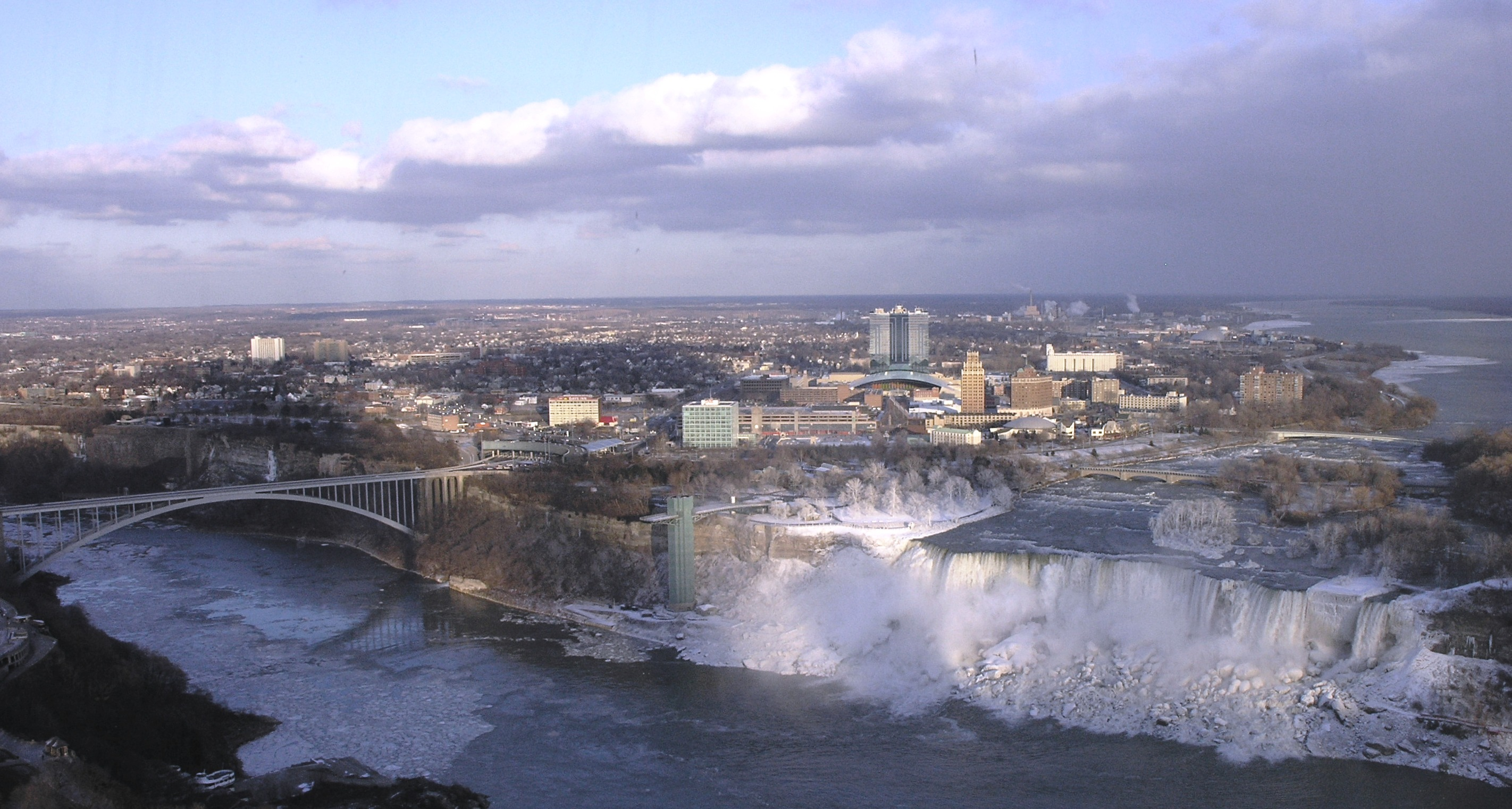
- Downtown Buffalo (top) and Niagara Falls (bottom)
Map of Buffalo–Cheektowaga–Olean, NY CSA
Buffalo–Cheektowaga MSA
Olean µSA
City of Buffalo
City of Niagara Falls
- Coordinates: 42°54′N 78°51′W
- Country: United States
- State: New York
- Largest city: Buffalo
- Other cities: Niagara Falls; Tonawanda; North Tonawanda; Lackawanna; Lockport; Olean; Salamanca

Area
  - Total: 1,567 sq mi (4,060 km^{2})

Population (2020)
  - Total: ▲1,166,902
  - Rank: 49th in the U.S. ▲
  - Density: 720/sq mi (277/km^{2})
  - Combined Bi-National Buffalo-Niagara (U.S.) Niagara Region (Canada): (2,025) 1,659,323 ▲

GDP
  - MSA: ▲$91 billion (2023)
- Time zone: UTC–5 (EST)
  - Summer (DST): UTC–4 (EDT)

The Buffalo–Niagara Falls metropolitan statistical area is a metropolitan area, designated by the United States Census Bureau, encompassing two counties - Erie and Niagara - in the state of New York. It is the second-largest metropolitan area in the state. As of the 2020 U.S. census, the metropolitan statistical area (MSA) had a population of 1,166,902. The larger Buffalo Niagara Region is an economic zone consisting of eight counties in Western New York. The bi-national region including the St. Catharines, Niagara, Canada statistical area and the Buffalo metro area, has a combined population of 1,659,323 as of 2025.The Buffalo-Niagara Metro and Greater Toronto Area together form one of the top 10 most populated urban regions in all of North America.

== Counties ==
- Erie
- Niagara
- Cattaraugus (part of CSA)

== Communities ==
=== Cities ===
- Buffalo
- Lackawanna
- Lockport
- Niagara Falls
- North Tonawanda
- Olean (part of CSA)
- Salamanca (part of CSA)
- Tonawanda

=== Towns ===
- Alden
- Albion
- Amherst
- Aurora
- Barre
- Boston
- Brant
- Cambria
- Carlton
- Cheektowaga
- Claredon
- Clarence
- Colden
- Collins
- Concord
- Eden
- Elma
- Evans
- Gaines
- Grand Island
- Hamburg
- Hartland
- Holland
- Kendall
- Lancaster
- Lewiston
- Lockport
- Marilla
- Murray
- Newfane
- Newstead
- Niagara
- North Collins
- Orchard Park
- Pendleton
- Porter
- Royalton
- Ridgeway
- Sardinia
- Somerset
- Shelby
- Tonawanda
- Wales
- West Seneca
- Wheatfield
- Wilson
- Yates

=== Villages ===
- Akron
- Albion
- Alden
- Angola
- Barker
- Blasdell
- Depew
- East Aurora
- Farnham
- Gowanda (partial)
- Hamburg
- Holley
- Kendall
- Kenmore
- Lancaster
- Lewiston
- Lyndonville
- Medina
- Middleport
- North Collins
- Orchard Park
- Sloan
- Springville
- Williamsville
- Wilson
- Youngstown

=== Census-designated places ===
- Angola on the Lake
- Billington Heights
- Cheektowaga
- Clarence Center
- East Amherst
- Eden
- Elma Center
- Gasport
- Harris Hill
- Holland
- Lake Erie Beach
- Newfane
- North Boston
- Olcott
- Ransomville
- Rapids
- South Lockport
- Tonawanda
- Town Line
- West Seneca

=== Indian Reservations ===
- Cattaraugus Reservation (partial)
- Tonawanda Reservation (Erie County)
- Tonawanda Reservation (Niagara County)
- Tuscarora Reservation (Niagara County)

== Demographics ==
Historical population
Census	Pop.	Note	%±
1940	959,487		—
1950	1,089,230		13.5%
1960	1,306,957		20.0%
1970	1,349,211		3.2%
1980	1,242,826		−7.9%
1990	1,189,340		−4.3%
2000	1,170,111		−1.6%
2010	1,135,509		−3.0%
2020	1,166,902		2.8%
Historical Population Figures

As of the 2020 Census there were 1,166,902 people residing in the MSA. It was 74.5% White, 13.0% Black or African American, 0.7% American Indian or Alaska Native, 4.2% Asian, <0.1% Pacific Islander, 2.1% Other and 5.5% two or more Races. 5.8% of the population identified as Hispanic or Latino.

County	Seat	2025 estimate	2020 Census	Change	Land Area	Density
Erie	Buffalo	946,741	954,236	−0.79%	1,043 sq mi (2,700 km^{2})	908/sq mi (350/km^{2})
Niagara	Lockport	208,912	212,666	−1.77%	522 sq mi (1,350 km^{2})	400/sq mi (155/km^{2})
Total		1,155,653	1,166,902	−0.96%	1,565 sq mi (4,050 km^{2})	738/sq mi (285/km^{2})

== Transportation ==
=== Amtrak stations ===
Station	Code	City	County	Lines served
Buffalo–Depew	BUF	Depew	Erie	Empire Service, Lake Shore Limited, Maple Leaf
Buffalo – Exchange Street	BFX	Buffalo	Erie	Empire Service, Maple Leaf
Niagara Falls	NFL	Niagara Falls	Niagara	Empire Service, Maple Leaf

=== Major airports ===
Airport	IATA code	ICAO code	County
Buffalo Niagara International Airport	BUF	KBUF	Erie
Niagara Falls International Airport	IAG	KIAG	Niagara

=== Major highways ===
- Interstate 90
- Interstate 190
- Interstate 290
- Interstate 990
- U.S. Route 20
- U.S. Route 20A
- U.S. Route 62
- U.S. Route 219
- New York State Route 5
- New York State Route 18
- New York State Route 33
- New York State Route 104
- New York State Route 198
- New York State Route 400

== Combined Statistical Area ==
The Buffalo–Cheektowaga–Olean combined statistical area (CSA), which includes the Buffalo–Niagara Falls MSA and adds Cattaraugus County, had a population of 1,215,826 inhabitants. It is part of the Great Lakes Megalopolis, which contains an estimated 54 million people.

- Metropolitan Statistical Areas (MSAs)
  - Buffalo–Cheektowaga (Erie and Niagara counties)
- Micropolitan Statistical Areas (μSAs)
  - Olean (Cattaraugus County)

Statistical Area	2025 estimate	2020 Census	Change	Land Area	Density
Buffalo–Cheektowaga, NY Metropolitan Statistical Area	1,155,653	1,166,902	−0.96%	1,565 sq mi (4,050 km^{2})	738/sq mi (285/km^{2})
Olean, NY Micropolitan Statistical Area	75,390	77,042	−2.14%	1,308 sq mi (3,390 km^{2})	58/sq mi (22/km^{2})
Total	1,231,043	1,243,944	−1.04%	2,873 sq mi (7,440 km^{2})	428/sq mi (165/km^{2})

== See also ==
- New York census statistical areas
- Buffalo Niagara Region
- Great Lakes region
