= Buffalo Niagara =

Buffalo Niagara may refer to a variety of places and things in the vicinity of Buffalo, New York, and Niagara Falls.

== Geography ==
- Buffalo–Niagara Falls metropolitan area
- Buffalo Niagara Region

== Infrastructure ==
- Buffalo Niagara International Airport
- Buffalo and Niagara Falls Railroad
