= Lake Shore High School (Angola, New York) =

Location
- 959 Beach Road; Angola, Erie County, New York 14006; United States; 42.6490°N 79.0377°W

Information
- School type: Public school (government funded), high school
- School district: Evans-Brant Central School District (Lake Shore)
- NCES District ID: 3616560
- Superintendent: Philip Johnson
- CEEB code: 330195
- NCES School ID: 361656001469
- Principal: Katy Berner-Wallen
- Teaching staff: 62.99 (FTE)
- Grades: 9–12; Ungraded
- Gender: Coeducational
- Enrollment: 665 (2024-2025)
- Student to teacher ratio: 10.56
- Language: English
- Hours in school day: 7
- Campus type: Rural
- Colors: Green and white
- Mascot: Eagle
- Yearbook: Shorelines
- Website: lshs.lakeshorecsd.org

Lake Shore High School is a public high school located in Angola, Erie County, New York, United States. It is the only high school operated by the Evans-Brant Central School District (Lake Shore). It serves students in the Town of Evans and Village of Angola, the Town of Brant and a portion of the Cattaraugus Indian Reservation. The current principal is Dr. Katy Berner-Wallen, the current assistant principals are Mr. Jason Sullivan and Mr. Daryl Besant.
