= Lake Erie Beach, New York =

- Census-designated place
- Location in Erie County and the state of New York
- Coordinates: 42°37′25″N 79°4′54″W
- Country: United States
- State: New York
- County: Erie
- Town: Evans

Area
  - Total: 3.82 sq mi (9.90 km^{2})
  - Land: 3.82 sq mi (9.90 km^{2})
  - Water: 0 sq mi (0.00 km^{2})
- Elevation: 627 ft (191 m)

Population (2020)
  - Total: 3,467
  - Density: 907.1/sq mi (350.23/km^{2})
- Time zone: UTC-5 (Eastern (EST))
  - Summer (DST): UTC-4 (EDT)
- ZIP Code: 14006 (Angola)
- FIPS code: 36-40486
- GNIS feature ID: 0954911

Lake Erie Beach is a hamlet and census-designated place (CDP) in the town of Evans, Erie County, New York, United States. As of the 2020 census, Lake Erie Beach had a population of 3,467. It is part of the Buffalo-Niagara Falls metropolitan area.

The community is located southwest of the village of Angola .

== Geography ==
Lake Erie Beach is located at 42°37′25″N 79°4′54″W (42.623658, -79.081635), between NY Route 5 and the Lake Erie shore. It is northeast of Evangola State Park.

According to the United States Census Bureau, the CDP has a total area of 3.8 square miles (9.8 km^{2}), all land.

== Demographics ==
Historical population
Census	Pop.	Note	%±
2020	3,467		—
U.S. Decennial Census

=== 2020 census ===
As of the 2020 census, the population was 3,467. The median age was 50.3 years. 16.9% of residents were under the age of 18 and 22.5% were 65 years of age or older. For every 100 females, there were 99.0 males, and for every 100 females age 18 and over, there were 96.9 males age 18 and over.

98.9% of residents lived in urban areas, while 1.1% lived in rural areas.

There were 1,563 households, of which 20.5% had children under the age of 18 living in them. Of all households, 44.9% were married-couple households, 19.6% were households with a male householder and no spouse or partner present, and 27.2% were households with a female householder and no spouse or partner present. About 32.7% of all households were made up of individuals, and 14.8% had someone living alone who was 65 years of age or older.

There were 2,038 housing units, of which 23.3% were vacant. The homeowner vacancy rate was 1.4%, and the rental vacancy rate was 8.6%.

Racial composition as of the 2020 census
Race	Number	Percent
White	3,228	93.1%
Black or African American	18	0.5%
American Indian and Alaska Native	36	1.0%
Asian	5	0.1%
Native Hawaiian and Other Pacific Islander	0	0.0%
Some other race	30	0.9%
Two or more races	150	4.3%
Hispanic or Latino (of any race)	81	2.3%

=== 2000 census ===
As of the census of 2000, there were 4,499 people, 1,709 households, and 1,213 families living in the hamlet. The population density was 1,168.7 inhabitants per square mile (451.2/km^{2}). There were 2,096 housing units at an average density of 544.5 per square mile (210.2/km^{2}). The racial makeup of the community was 97.60% White, 0.20% African American, 0.64% Native American, 0.09% Asian, 0.22% from other races, and 1.24% from two or more races. Hispanic or Latino of any race were 0.93% of the population.

There were 1,709 households, out of which 35.5% had children under the age of 18 living with them, 53.7% were married couples living together, 12.4% had a female householder with no husband present, and 29.0% were non-families. 24.0% of all households were made up of individuals, and 8.0% had someone living alone who was 65 years of age or older. The average household size was 2.63 and the average family size was 3.11.

In the village the population was spread out, with 27.7% under the age of 18, 6.2% from 18 to 24, 31.1% from 25 to 44, 24.6% from 45 to 64, and 10.3% who were 65 years of age or older. The median age was 37 years. For every 100 females, there were 99.2 males. For every 100 females age 18 and over, there were 96.3 males.

The median income for a household in the community was $36,603, and the median income for a family was $39,841. Males had a median income of $35,949 versus $23,974 for females. The per capita income for the CDP was $15,643. About 5.8% of families and 8.1% of the population were below the poverty line, including 11.1% of those under age 18 and 3.1% of those age 65 or over.
