= Wendt Beach Park =

Park in New York, United States

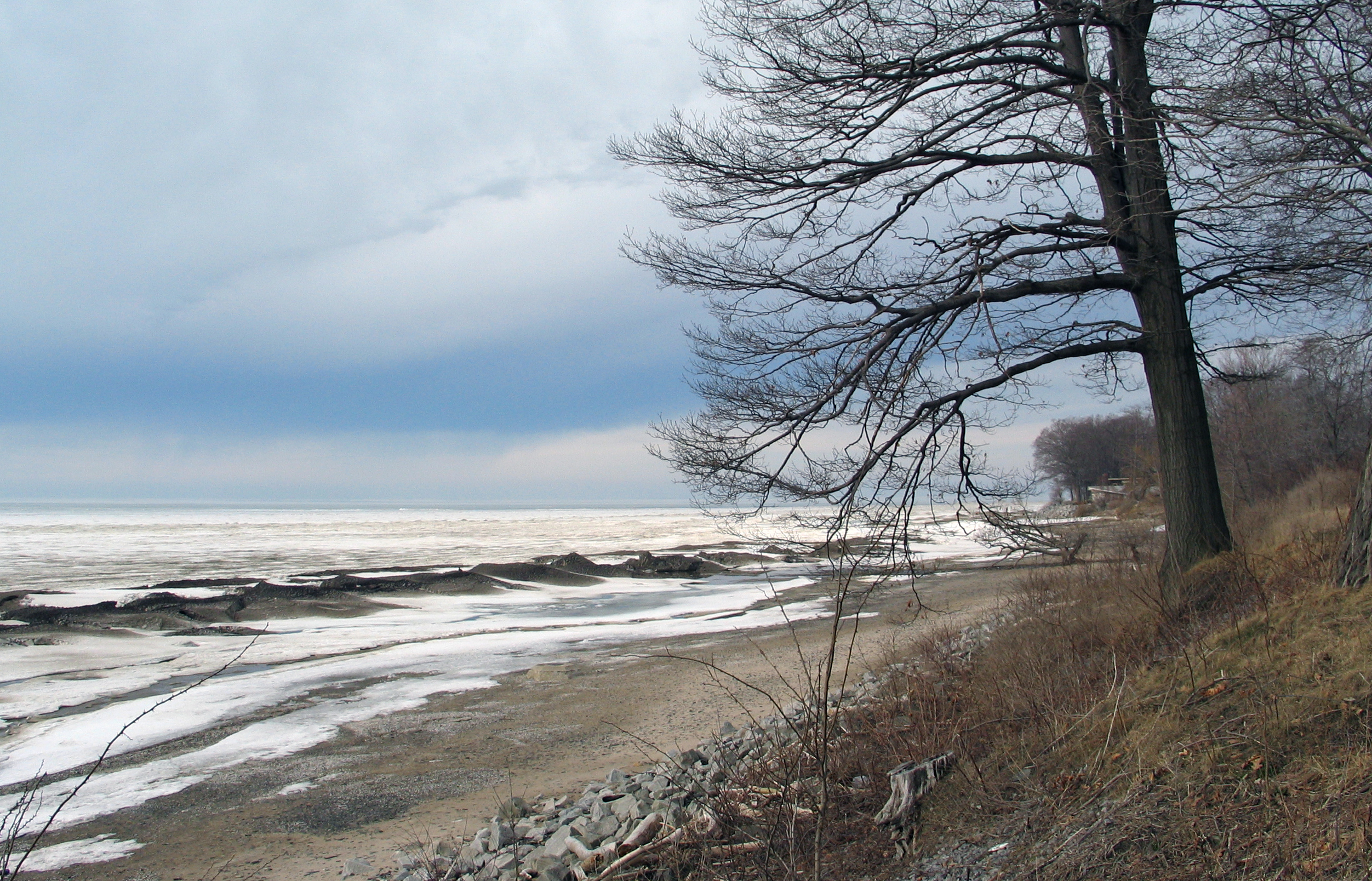
- View of Wendt Beach looking north, March 2007.

- Location within New York
- Type: Regional park
- Location: 7676 Old Lake Shore Road; Derby, New York
- Nearest city: Buffalo, New York
- Coordinates: 42°40′34″N 79°03′06″W
- Area: 178 acres (72 hectares)
- Operator: Erie County Department of Parks, Recreation and Forestry
- Open: All year
- Website: Wendt Beach Park

Wendt Beach Park is a 178-acre (72-hectare) waterfront park in Erie County, in the U.S. state of New York. The park is located along the shore of Lake Erie in the Town of Evans. It is operated by the Erie County Department of Parks, Recreation and Forestry. Access is free and it is open to the public year-round.

== History ==
Wendt Beach Park occupies the former summer home property of the Wendt family, who had named the parcel "The Ridgewood." A large mansion and several outbuildings were built on the property in the 1800s by Buffalo industrialist Henry W. Wendt, Jr. of the Buffalo Forge Company.

=== Deterioration of Wendt Mansion ===
The Wendt Mansion, recognized as being in need of major renovations in 2003, has deteriorated greatly in recent years. It was the victim of vandalism in 2007, when thieves used a blowtorch to remove copper piping from the building. This caused major flooding in the mansion's basement, which went unnoticed for several days due to a non-functioning alarm system. In 2010, vandals once again targeted the house, smashing many of its windows. A 2012 study of the mansion sought to determine the costs of restoration, although at that time the prospect of demolition was mentioned as a possibility for the structure.

== Facilities ==
Although previously allowed, swimming was prohibited at Wendt Beach Park in the summer of 2014. County officials noted that they were focusing limited resources by staffing lifeguards at the nearby Bennett Beach Park. Swimming conditions at Wendt Beach Park were described as "terrible" in recent years due to rocky conditions.

The park remains open for activities such as hiking, picnicking, baseball, and soccer.
