= Nathaniel Murray =

Nathaniel Murray may refer to:

- Nathaniel Allison Murray, co-founder of Alpha Phi Alpha
- Nathaniel O. Murray (1834–1882), American steamboat owner and politician
