= First Church of Evans Complex =

Historic church in New York, United States

- The First Church of Evans Complex
- U.S. National Register of Historic Places
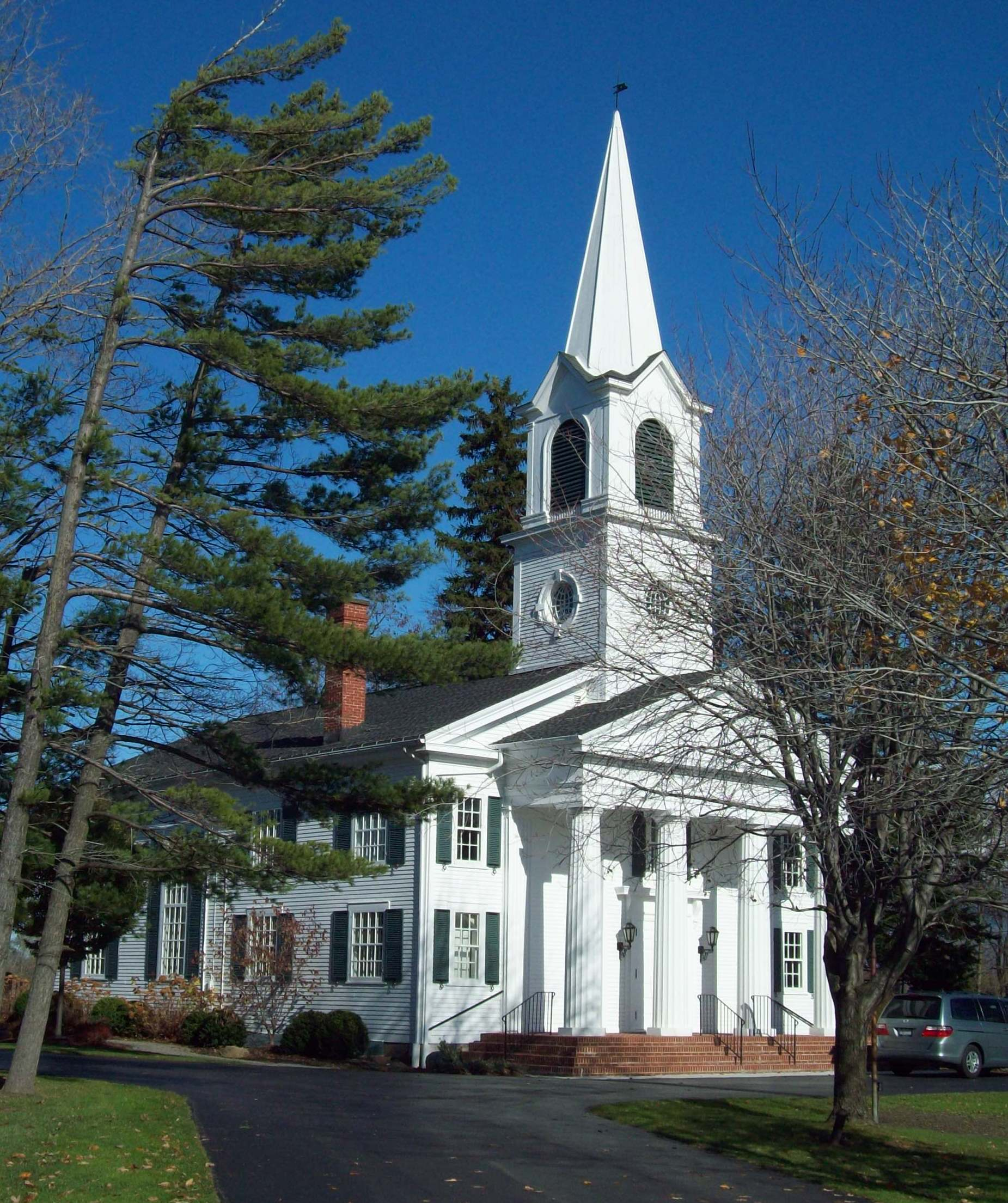
- The First Church of Evans, November 2010

- Location within New York Location within the United States
- Location: 7431 Erie Rd., Derby, New York
- Coordinates: 42°41′0″N 79°0′48″W
- Built: 1915
- Architect: Mann and Cook; Ingersoll, George M.
- Architectural style: Colonial Revival
- NRHP reference No.: 06000257
- Added to NRHP: April 12, 2006

The First Church of Evans Complex is a historic Non-denominational church complex located at Derby in Erie County, New York. The 5.5-acre (2.2 ha) property includes the church, cemeteries, farmhouse (manse), and historic Ingersoll barn with later additions that serves as a community clubhouse. The church is an eclectic Colonial Revival style structure designed by Buffalo architects Mann and Cook and constructed in 1915. The original cemetery includes graves that predate the congregation's founding in 1818.

It was listed on the National Register of Historic Places in 2006.

== Gallery ==
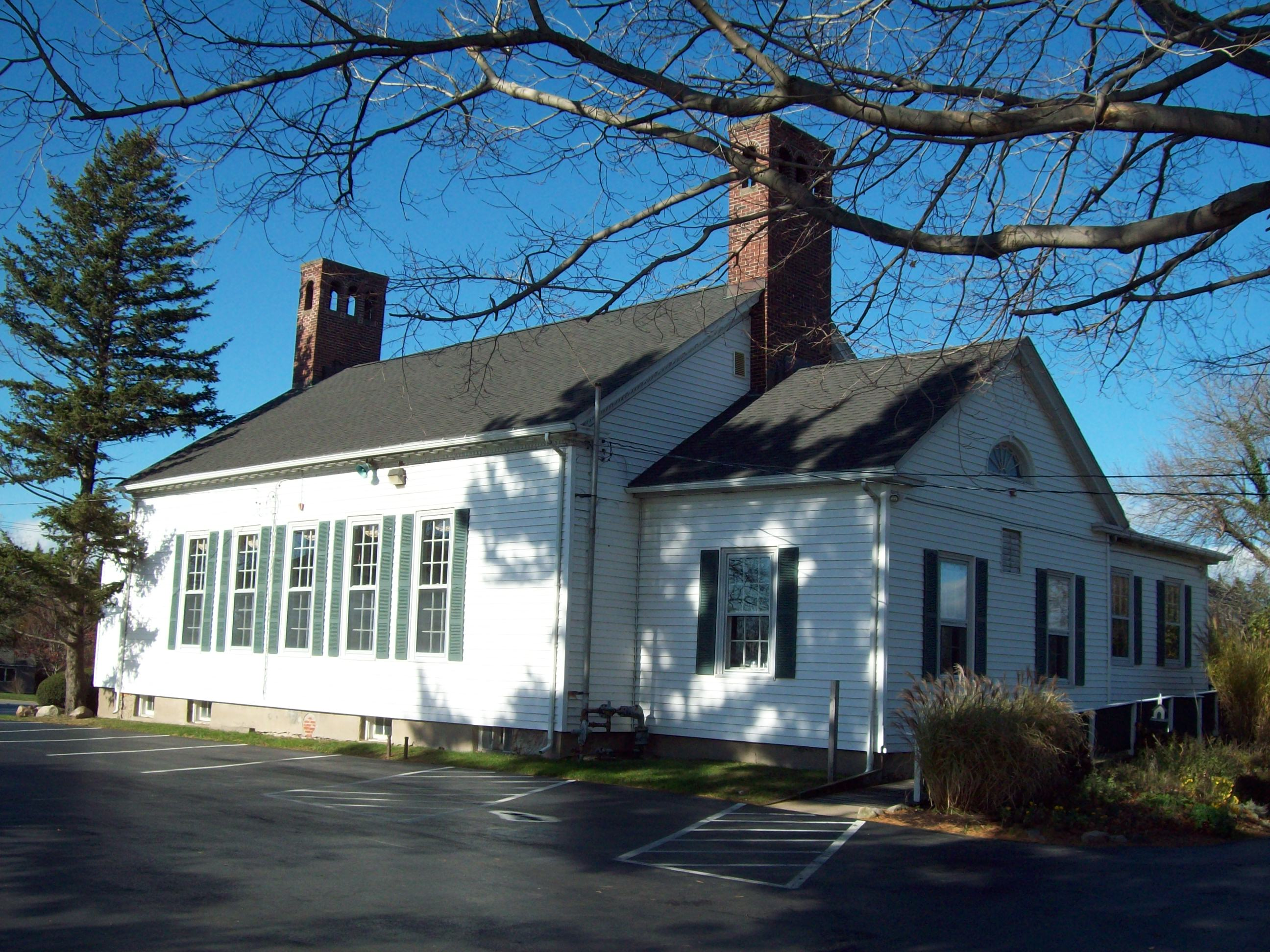
Clubhouse, November 2010

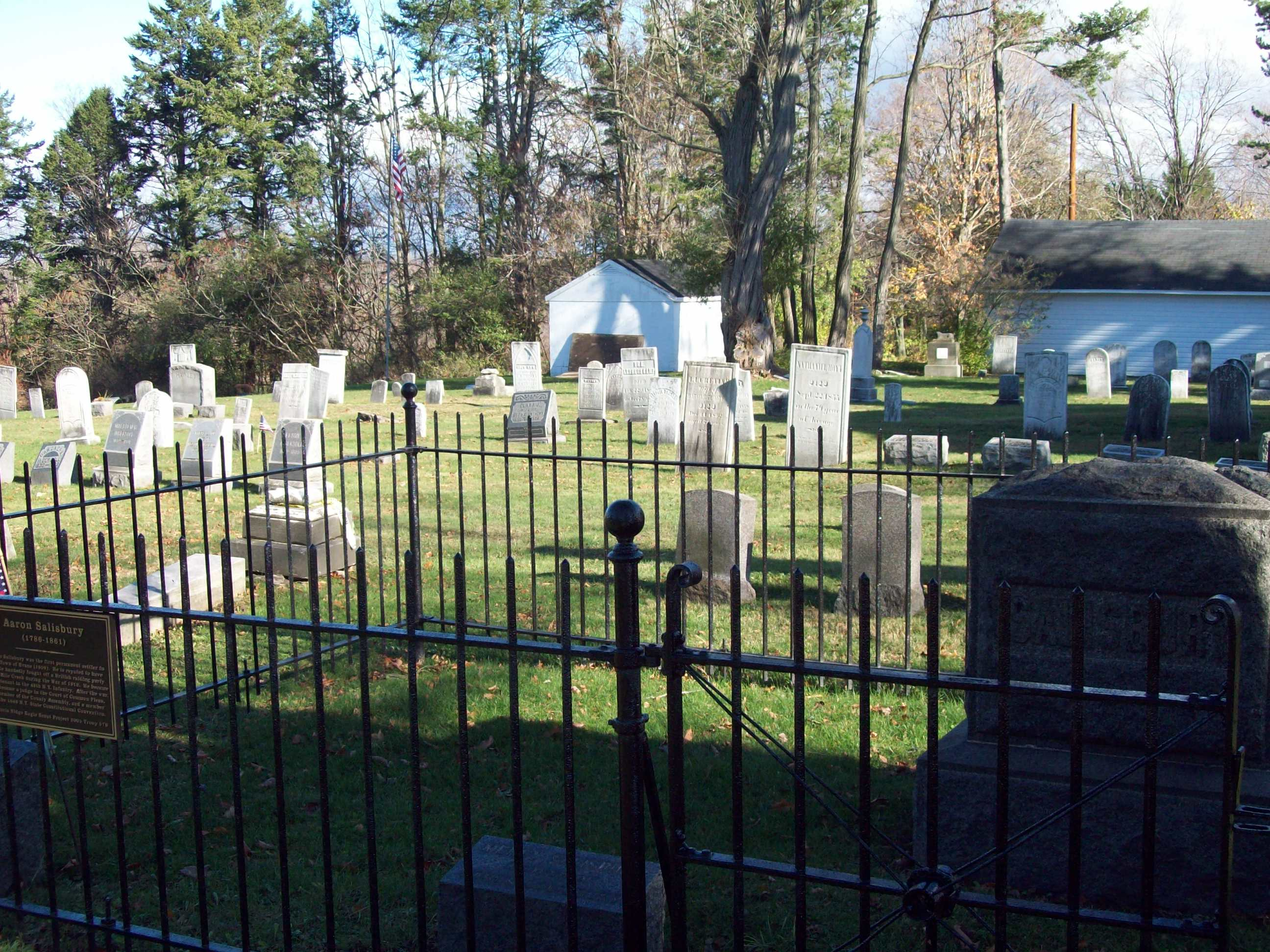
Cemetery

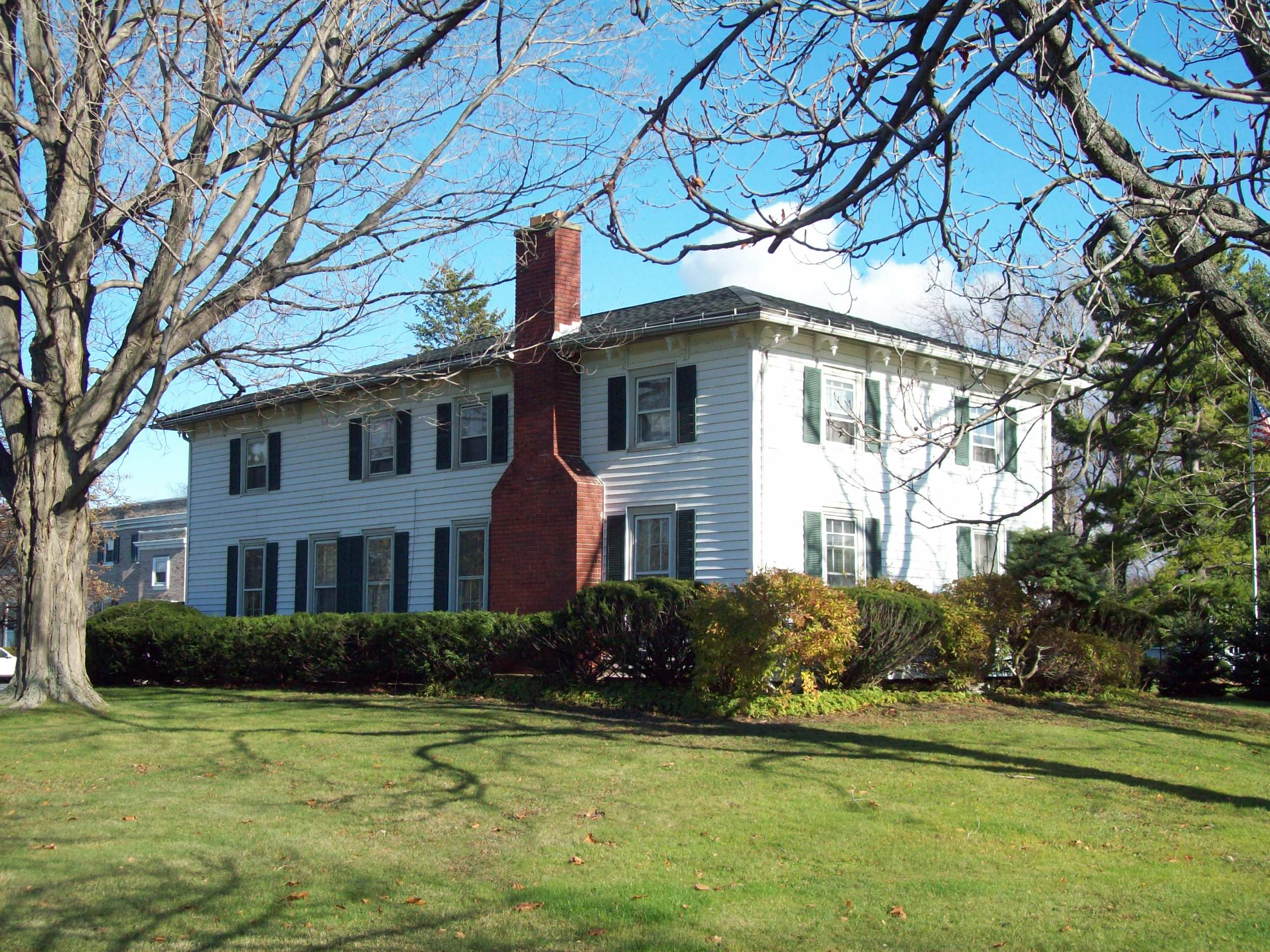
Manse
