= North Evans, New York =

Hamlet in New York, United States

Coordinates: 42°41′49″N 78°56′29″W

North Evans is a hamlet in the town of Evans in Erie County, New York, United States. The North Evans Volunteer Fire Company is located on Versailles Road, as is the Hobuck Flats Fishing Access site. Hobuck Flats also includes a 1.1-mile hiking trail that passes Buttermilk Falls, a waterfall with two drops, of 15 and 54 feet respectively.
