= Highland-on-the-Lake, New York =

- Census-designated place
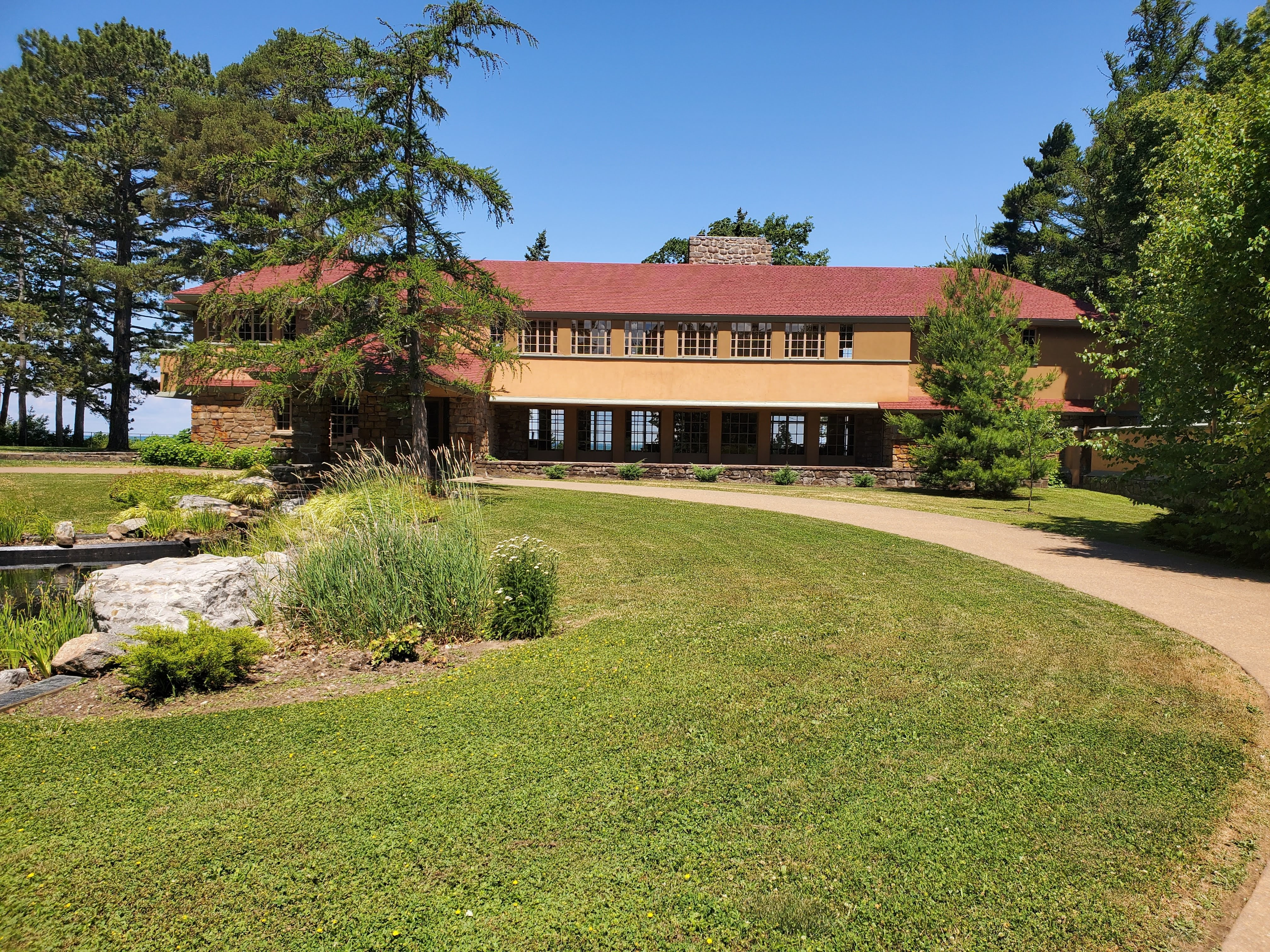
- Graycliff

- Location within New York Location within the United States
- Coordinates: 42°42′0″N 78°58′59″W
- Country: United States
- State: New York
- County: Erie
- Town: Evans

Area
  - Total: 2.05 sq mi (5.30 km^{2})
  - Land: 2.04 sq mi (5.28 km^{2})
  - Water: 0.0077 sq mi (0.02 km^{2})
- Elevation: 686 ft (209 m)

Population (2020)
  - Total: 3,765
  - Density: 1,846/sq mi (712.8/km^{2})
- Time zone: UTC-5 (Eastern (EST))
  - Summer (DST): UTC-4 (EDT)
- ZIP Code: 14047 (Derby)
- Area code: 716
- FIPS code: 36-34528
- GNIS feature ID: 2812765

Highland-on-the-Lake is a hamlet and census-designated place (CDP) in the town of Evans, Erie County, New York, United States. It was first listed as a CDP prior to the 2020 census. As of the 2020 census, Highland-on-the-Lake had a population of 3,765.

The CDP is in the southwestern part of the county, in the northern part of the town of Evans. It sits on high ground on the shore of Lake Erie, on bluffs which in some places rise 100 feet (30 m) above the lake. New York State Route 5 runs through the CDP, leading northeast 16 miles (26 km) to Buffalo and southwest 27 miles (43 km) to Dunkirk. The Frank Lloyd Wright-designed Graycliff is in the northern part of the CDP, overlooking Lake Erie.

== Demographics ==
Historical population
Census	Pop.	Note	%±
2020	3,765		—
U.S. Decennial Census

=== 2020 census ===
As of the 2020 census, Highland-on-the-Lake had a population of 3,765. The median age was 45.6 years. 18.7% of residents were under the age of 18 and 21.4% of residents were 65 years of age or older. For every 100 females there were 92.6 males, and for every 100 females age 18 and over there were 90.9 males age 18 and over.

99.7% of residents lived in urban areas, while 0.3% lived in rural areas.

There were 1,630 households in Highland-on-the-Lake, of which 24.8% had children under the age of 18 living in them. Of all households, 47.6% were married-couple households, 18.9% were households with a male householder and no spouse or partner present, and 25.2% were households with a female householder and no spouse or partner present. About 28.5% of all households were made up of individuals and 11.9% had someone living alone who was 65 years of age or older.

There were 1,722 housing units, of which 5.3% were vacant. The homeowner vacancy rate was 0.4% and the rental vacancy rate was 8.0%.

Racial composition as of the 2020 census
Race	Number	Percent
White	3,501	93.0%
Black or African American	22	0.6%
American Indian and Alaska Native	20	0.5%
Asian	38	1.0%
Native Hawaiian and Other Pacific Islander	1	0.0%
Some other race	15	0.4%
Two or more races	168	4.5%
Hispanic or Latino (of any race)	100	2.7%
