= Brant (hamlet), New York =

Hamlet in New York, United States

Coordinates: 42°35′18″N 79°01′04″W

Brant is a hamlet in the town of Brant in Erie County, New York, United States.
