= Java, New York =

- Town
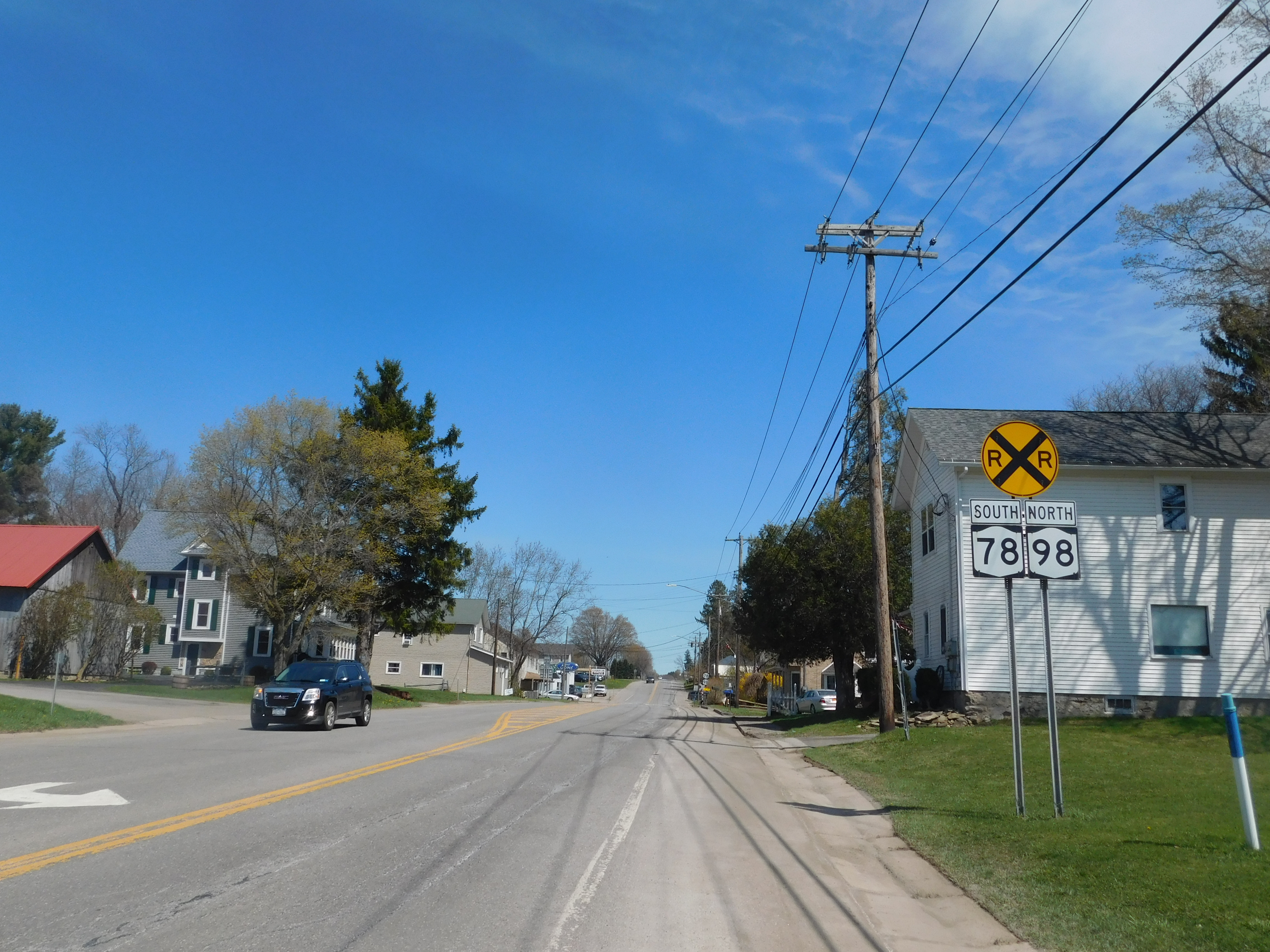
- The hamlet of Java Center along Route 78 and Route 98.

- Location within Wyoming County and New York

- Location within the state of New York
- Coordinates: 42°39′20″N 78°22′37″W
- Country: United States
- State: New York
- County: Wyoming

Area
  - Total: 47.33 sq mi (122.58 km^{2})
  - Land: 47.13 sq mi (122.06 km^{2})
  - Water: 0.20 sq mi (0.52 km^{2})
- Elevation: 1,522 ft (464 m)

Population (2010)
  - Total: 2,057
  - Estimate (2016): 1,992
  - Density: 42.3/sq mi (16.32/km^{2})
- Time zone: UTC-5 (Eastern (EST))
  - Summer (DST): UTC-4 (EDT)
- ZIP code: 14082
- Area code: 585
- FIPS code: 36-38341
- GNIS feature ID: 0979104

Java (/ˈdʒeɪvə/; JAY-vuh) is an incorporated town in Wyoming County, New York. The population was 2,057 at the 2010 census. The Town of Java is on the western border of Wyoming County.

== History ==
The Town of Java was founded in 1832 from part of the Town of Arcade (then the Town of China). It was named after the island of Java.

== Geography ==
According to the United States Census Bureau, the town has a total area of 47.3 square miles (123 km^{2}), of which 47.1 square miles (122 km^{2}) is land and 0.2 square miles (0.52 km^{2}) (0.47%) is water. The largest body of water in Java is Java Lake, which is the headwaters of Cattaraugus Creek.

The west town line is the border of Erie County.

== Demographics ==
Historical population
Census	Pop.	Note	%±
1840	2,331		—
1850	2,245		−3.7%
1860	2,358		5.0%
1870	1,956		−17.0%
1880	1,953		−0.2%
1890	1,824		−6.6%
1900	1,770		−3.0%
1910	1,633		−7.7%
1920	1,469		−10.0%
1930	1,403		−4.5%
1940	1,364		−2.8%
1950	1,455		6.7%
1960	1,757		20.8%
1970	1,949		10.9%
1980	2,273		16.6%
1990	2,197		−3.3%
2000	2,222		1.1%
2010	2,057		−7.4%
2016 (est.)	1,992		−3.2%
U.S. Decennial Census

As of the census of 2000, there were 2,222 people, 807 households, and 590 families residing in the town. The population density was 47.2 inhabitants per square mile (18.2/km^{2}). There were 1,035 housing units at an average density of 22.0 per square mile (8.5/km^{2}). The racial makeup of the town was 99.14% White, 0.14% African American, 0.18% Native American, 0.09% Asian, and 0.45% from two or more races. Hispanic or Latino of any race were 0.41% of the population.

There were 807 households, out of which 35.8% had children under the age of 18 living with them, 62.8% were married couples living together, 5.7% had a female householder with no husband present, and 26.8% were non-families. 20.6% of all households were made up of individuals, and 9.3% had someone living alone who was 65 years of age or older. The average household size was 2.75 and the average family size was 3.21.

In the town, the population was spread out, with 27.1% under the age of 18, 7.7% from 18 to 24, 30.9% from 25 to 44, 23.0% from 45 to 64, and 11.4% who were 65 years of age or older. The median age was 37 years. For every 100 females, there were 104.0 males. For every 100 females age 18 and over, there were 106.9 males.

The median income for a household in the town was $43,708, and the median income for a family was $47,120. Males had a median income of $35,703 versus $24,625 for females. The per capita income for the town was $18,398. About 3.9% of families and 6.3% of the population were below the poverty line, including 8.1% of those under age 18 and 7.4% of those age 65 or over.

== Communities and locations in the Town of Java ==
- Cattaraugus Creek – A river, arising from Java Lake, that flows into Lake Erie.
- Curriers – A hamlet in the southwest corner of the town.
- Hick's Corners – A location east of Curriers.
- Java Center – A hamlet at the intersection of Routes 77 and 78.
- Java Lake – A hamlet on Java Lake Road, west of a small lake.
- Java Lake (lake) – A small lake that is the source of Cattaraugus Creek.
- Java – The hamlet of Java (also called Java Village), in the northwest corner of the town. This community is on Route 78. The Java School No. 1 was listed on the National Register of Historic Places in 2001.
- North Java – A location in the northeast part of the town. The Arcade and Attica Railroad was listed on the National Register of Historic Places in 1980.
- Waldos Corners – A hamlet at the intersection of Routes 78 and 98.

== Politics ==
In 2017 Jon Campbell of the Democrat & Chronicle wrote that the county "is solid Trump Country" and that Java Town "is the epicenter."

== Education ==
Yorkshire-Pioneer Central School District covers the majority of Java Town. Other districts which cover parts of Java Town include Attica Central School District, Holland Central School District, and Warsaw Central School District.

== Notable people ==
- J. W. Eddy, builder of Angels Flight funicular railroad
- Ed Don George, Olympian in freestyle wrestling at 1928 Summer Olympics, later was a professional wrestler, born in North Java in 1905
