= Java School No. 1 =

- U.S. National Register of Historic Places
- Location within New York Location within the United States
- Location: NY 78, Java Village, New York
- Coordinates: 42°40′26″N 78°26′11″W
- Area: 0.3 acres (0.12 ha)
- Architectural style: Italian Villa
- NRHP reference No.: 01000672
- Added to NRHP: June 21, 2001

Java School No. 1 is a historic school in Java, Wyoming County, New York. It is a two-story frame structure in the Italian Villa style. It features a four sided, square cupola at the apex of the roof. It was built about 1850 and operated as a school until 1967. In 1969, the building was occupied by the local Grange and now also houses the Java Historical Society Museum, a local history museum that is open by appointment.

It was listed on the National Register of Historic Places in 2001.
