= Pontiac, New York =

Hamlet in New York, United States

Coordinates: 42°37′26″N 78°58′09″W

Pontiac is a hamlet in the town of Evans in Erie County, New York, United States.
