= Graycliff =

House in Highland-on-the-Lake, New York

- U.S. National Register of Historic Places
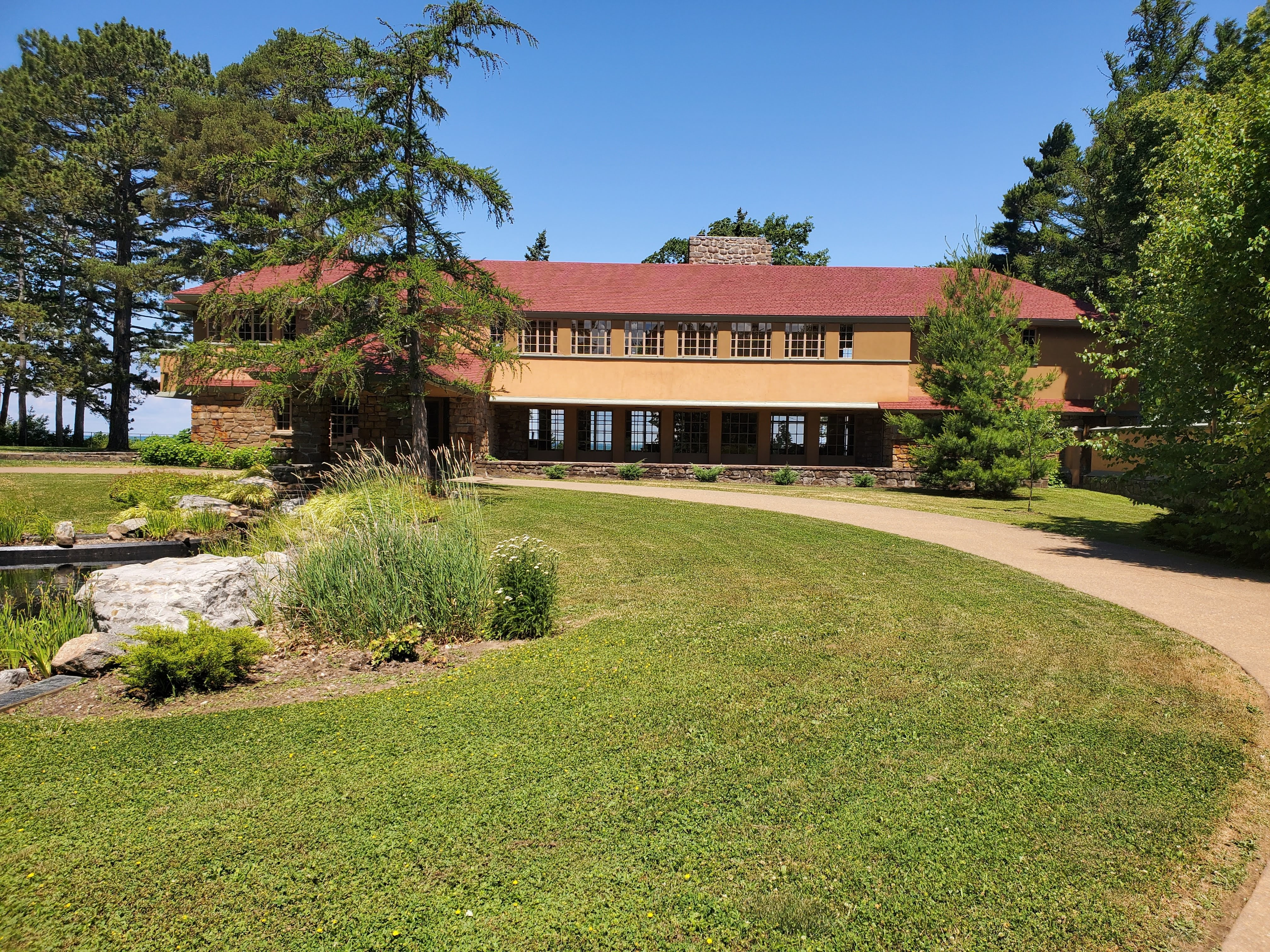

- Location within New York
- Interactive map showing Graycliff's location
- Location: Highland-on-the-Lake, New York
- Nearest city: Buffalo, New York
- Coordinates: 42°42′48″N 78°58′22″W
- Built: 1926
- Architect: Frank Lloyd Wright
- NRHP reference No.: 98001222
- Added to NRHP: October 1, 1998

The Graycliff estate was designed by Frank Lloyd Wright in 1926, and built between 1926 and 1931. It is approximately 17 miles southwest of downtown Buffalo, New York, at 6472 Old Lake Shore Road in the hamlet of Highland-on-the-Lake, with a mailing address of Derby. Situated on a bluff overlooking Lake Erie with sweeping views of downtown Buffalo and the Ontario shore, It is one of the most ambitious and extensive summer estates Wright designed. It is now fully restored and operates as a historic house museum, open for guided tours year round (with reduced activity during the winter). There is also a summer Market at Graycliff, free and open to the public on select Thursday evenings. Graycliff Conservancy is run by Executive Director Anna Kaplan, who was hired in 2019.

== History ==
Graycliff was the summer home of Isabelle Reidpath Martin (1869–1945) and her husband, Buffalo entrepreneur Darwin D. Martin (1865–1935). Graycliff was the second of two complexes Frank Lloyd Wright designed for the couple, the first being the Martin House Complex, their city residence. By the time of Graycliff's commission, Wright and the Martins had been personal friends as well as clients for over twenty years. Between the time of the completion of the Martin House Complex and the construction of Graycliff grew a great long-term friendship, to the extent that the Martins provided financial assistance and other support to Wright as his career unfolded.

In the early years of their long relationship, Darwin Martin was actively involved with selecting Frank Lloyd Wright as the architect for the Larkin Administration Building, Wright's first major commercial project. Martin was an executive with the Larkin Company, and Wright also designed houses in Buffalo for fellow Larkin Company executives William R. Heath and Walter V. Davidson.

Isabelle R. Martin was the client of record for Graycliff, and it was designed by Wright for her pleasure.

Graycliff is one of only five of Frank Lloyd Wright's designs that were built between 1925 and 1935, and the only Wright-designed structure built between Taliesin (1925) and Fallingwater (1936) using stone. Wright believed stone to be the only true building material and may be why he insisted the Martins incorporate it at Graycliff. Graycliff is considered to be one of Wright's most important mid-career works in his Organic Style.

=== Restoration ===
Although the Martin family lost much of its fortune due to the Great Depression and was forced to abandon the city house in 1937, they kept Graycliff, and returned annually until 1943.

The property was purchased from the family by the Piarists, a Roman Catholic teaching order, in 1951. The Piarist Fathers, from Hungary, established a boarding school on the grounds, as well as Calasanctius, a private high school for gifted children in Buffalo, named after the order's founder. Although they added two structures to Wright's original design, all Wright-designed buildings were left intact. Eventually enrollment dwindled and the schools closed; the number of priests in residence also declined dramatically. Finally in late 1997, the Piarists decided they could no longer afford to maintain the property, and put it up for sale. Soon after, a group of concerned individuals purchased the property, which was threatened with destruction due to its prime lakeside location and attractiveness to private developers. The group formed the non-profit Graycliff Conservancy in order to buy the property, restore it to its original condition, and open it to the public. This effort, aided by volunteers from throughout the community, has undertaken extensive restoration, both to remove the non-Wright additions and to restore the nearly ninety-year-old buildings, and has created a schedule of public tours.

The Graycliff Conservancy is the recipient of a Save America's Treasures grant from the US Department of the Interior, and has received many awards for its work. Graycliff is a New York State Landmark and is listed on the National Register of Historic Places. In November 2024, the Graycliff Conservancy began construction on a new visitor center. As part of the new construction plan, the estate temporarily closed and is expected to resume tours in March 2025. The new visitor center is due to be completed in 2026, in celebration of the 100th anniversary of Frank Lloyd Wright's design for the Graycliff estate.

== Design ==
Graycliff is a complex of three buildings integrated within an 8.5-acre (34,000 m^{2}) landscape. It is situated high on a bluff with views of Lake Erie across to Ontario. In Wright's Organic Architecture style, are set amidst extensive grounds and gardens also designed by Wright.

The largest building, the main "Isabelle R. Martin House," is perhaps most remarkable for its two stone veneered sections framing a central pavilion-like center of transparent glass walls, allowing visitors to actually see through the building itself to the lake beyond, revolutionary for a 1926 design. It also features spacious cantilevered balconies, expansive terraces, and "ribbons" of windows that allow the experience of nature from within and through the house. On especially clear days the spray of Niagara Falls is visible through the framed opening created by the cantilevered upper bridge and the stone veneered massing at each end of the home.

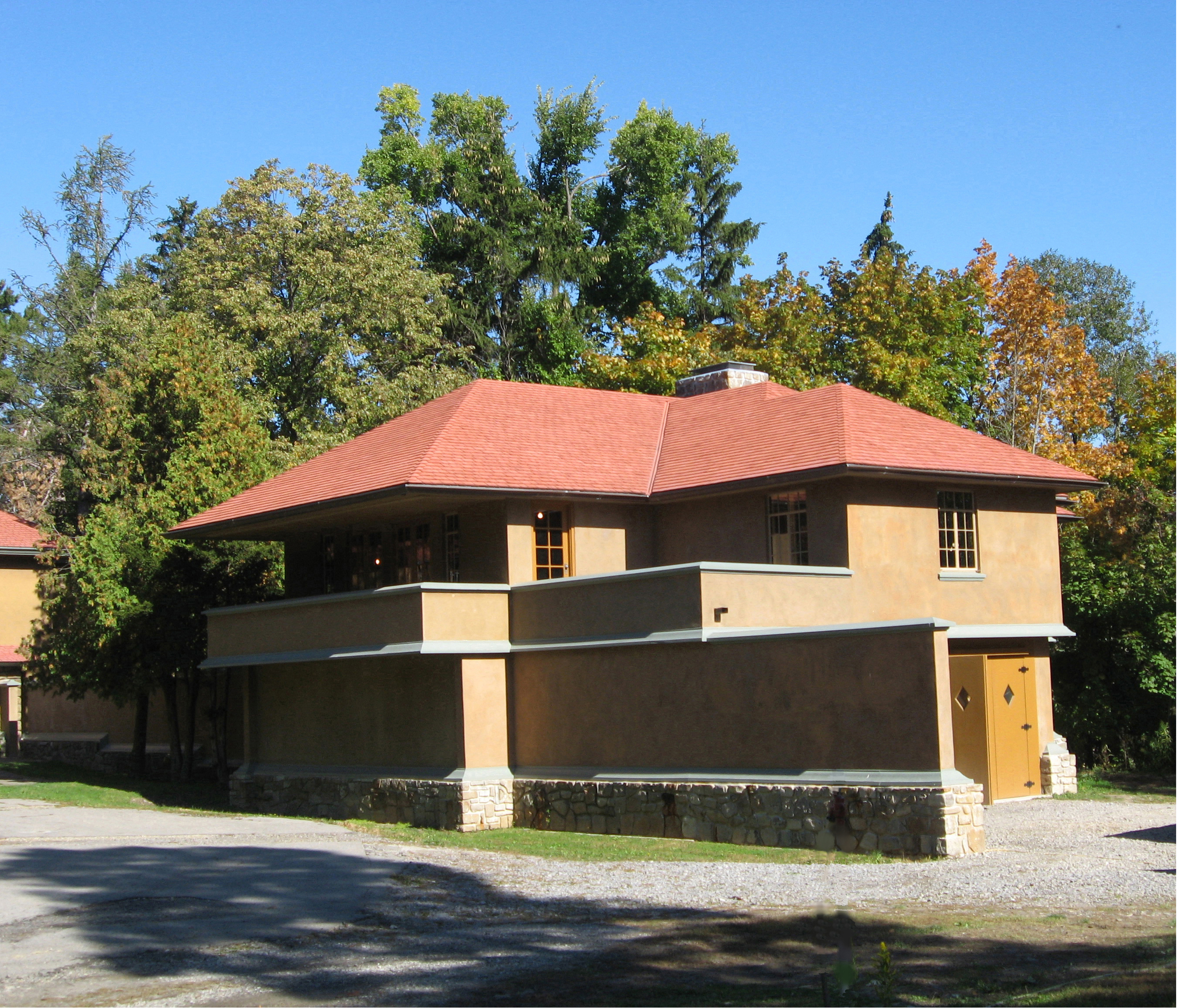
The Foster House

The Foster House was originally designed as a garage, with an apartment above for the chauffeur and his family. In 1929 the Martins owned a Pierce-Arrow touring car as well as a Detroit Electric car. After their first summer in residence, the Martins asked Wright to alter and expand the building. Once complete, the Martins' daughter Dorothy, together with her husband James Foster and their children Margaret and Darwin Martin Foster, spent many happy summers in residence. Like the Martin House, the Foster House has strong horizontal lines echoing the lake beyond, cantilevered balconies, and numerous windows.

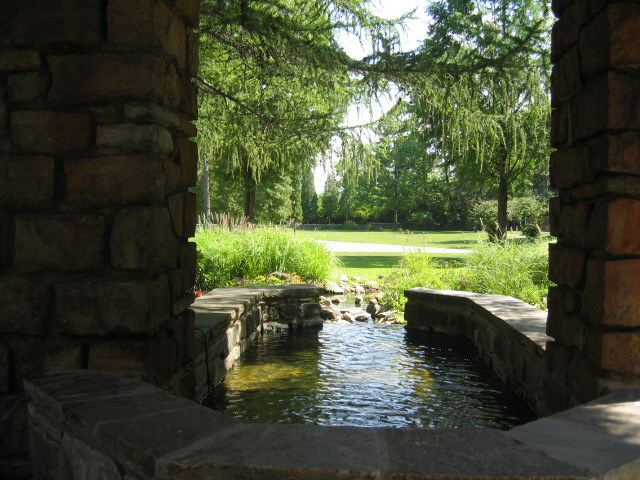
Fountain, Graycliff

The smallest building of the complex is known as the Heat Hut. Like the other two buildings, it is constructed of stone found at the lake's edge, ocher stucco, and a red cedar shingle roof.

Garden walls, composed of the same stone and stucco as the Foster and Martin Houses, enhance the horizontal planes of the architecture. The gardens and grounds feature water elements designed by Wright, including a porte-cochère that extends from Martin House, cantilevering beyond its stone pier supports over a stone basin from which water flows into a large irregularly shaped pool. This was intended to create an illusion of the lake flowing through the house. On the west side, a broad esplanade connects the terrace to the cliff and lake. The esplanade was designed to carry water, pumped from Lake Erie, down its length and over the bluffs, completing the illusion of water flowing through. Deemed financially extravagant, this feature was halted after only the esplanade itself was completed. Other architectural features of the landscape include a sunken garden, a hidden garden, and stone walls in a "waterfall" pattern. Not surprisingly, it was Darwin Martin who first introduced Wright to Niagara Falls, less than 40 miles (64 km) to the north.

The extensive 8.5 acres (34,000 m^{2}) of grounds and gardens were also designed by Frank Lloyd Wright, with one of the few, if not only, landscape designs in his own hand. These include a tennis court designed by Wright, as well as trees and shrubs designed to complement the architecture. Additional significant design-work was done by Ellen Biddle Shipman, one of the early and renowned women landscape architects, and one of the creators of the Arts & Crafts and American Craftsman style landscape design, supplementing those of Wright with colorful flowers and a picking garden.

== Gallery ==
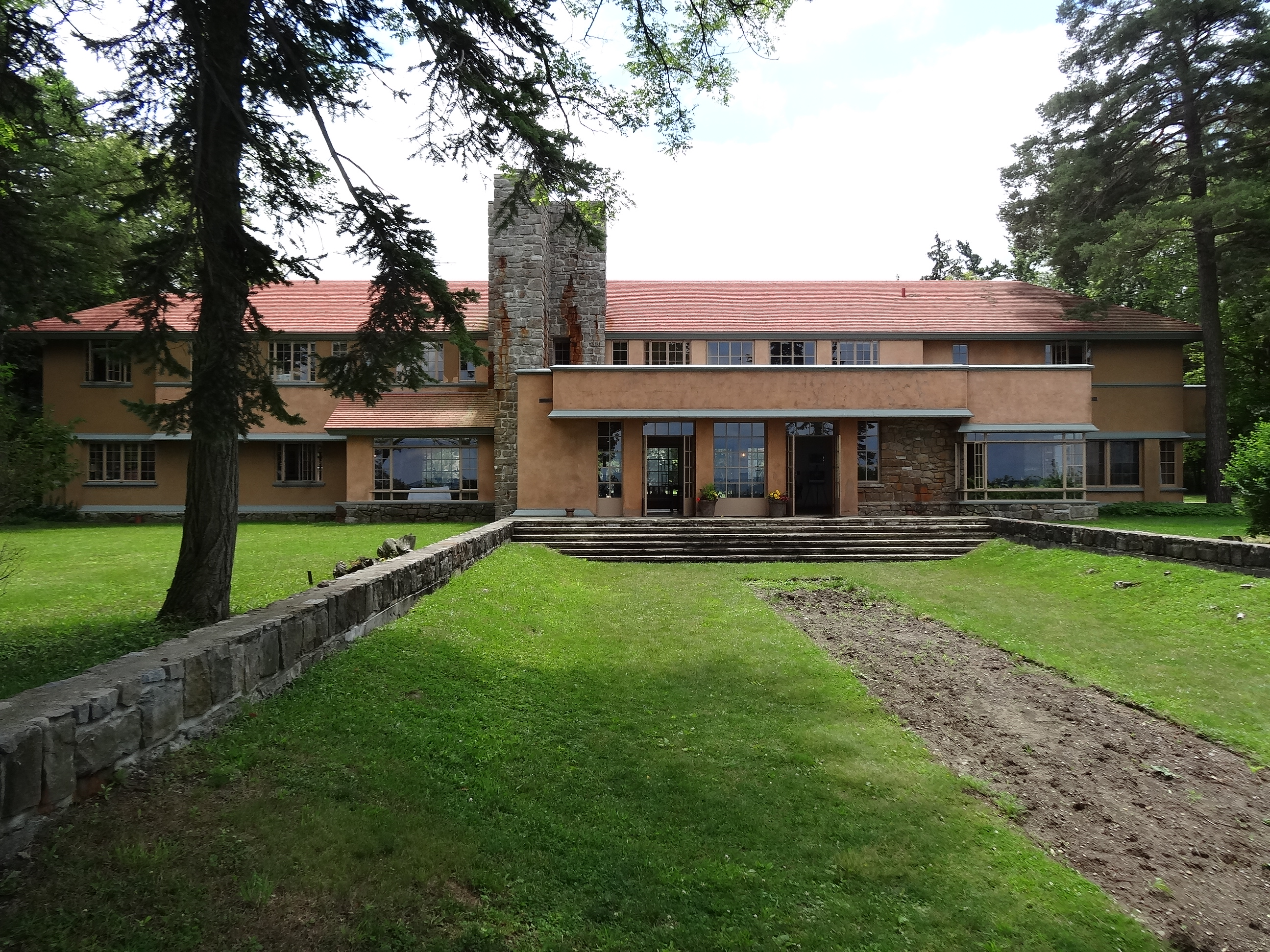
Rear of Graycliff

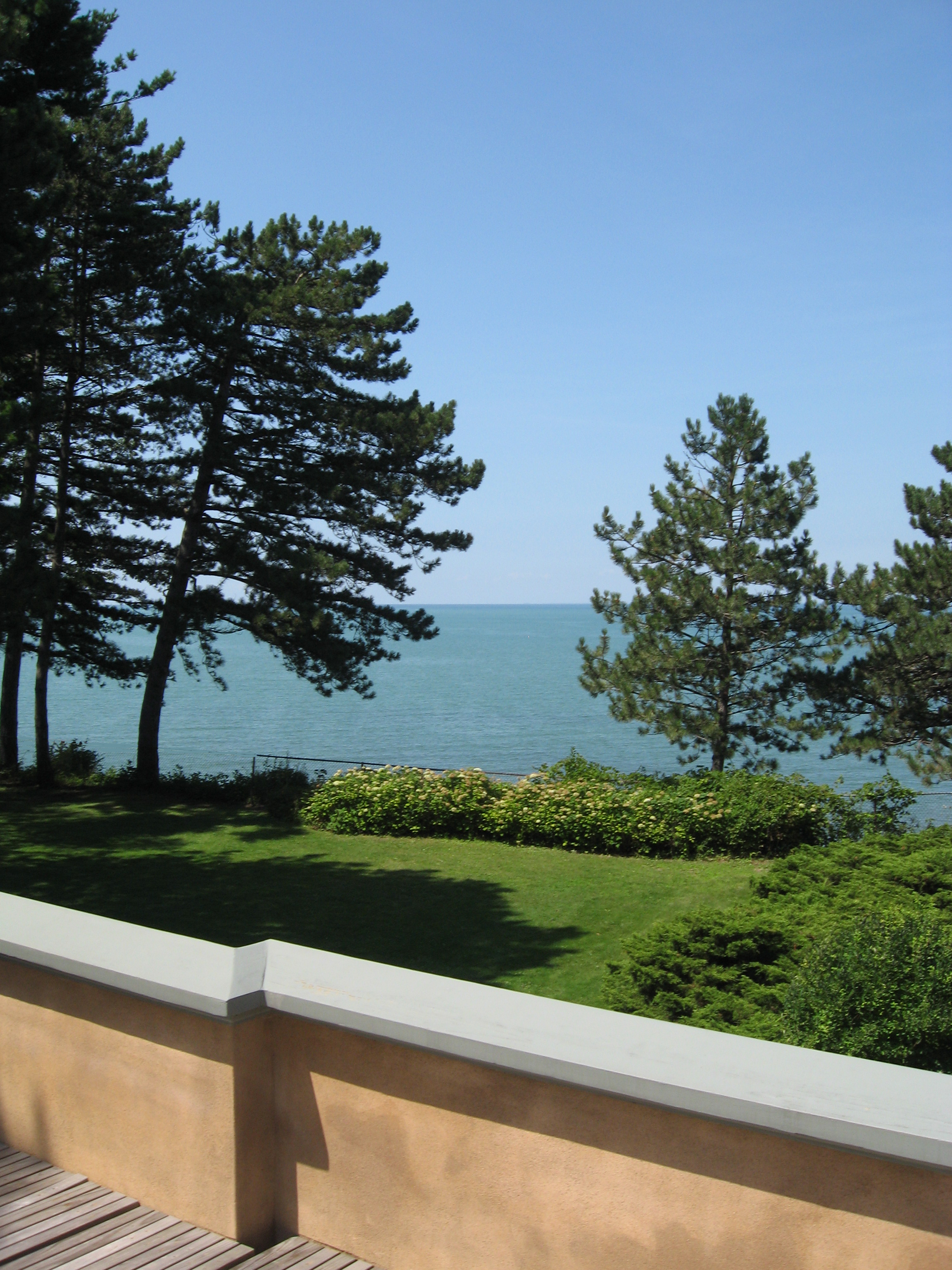
View from Isabelle's balcony

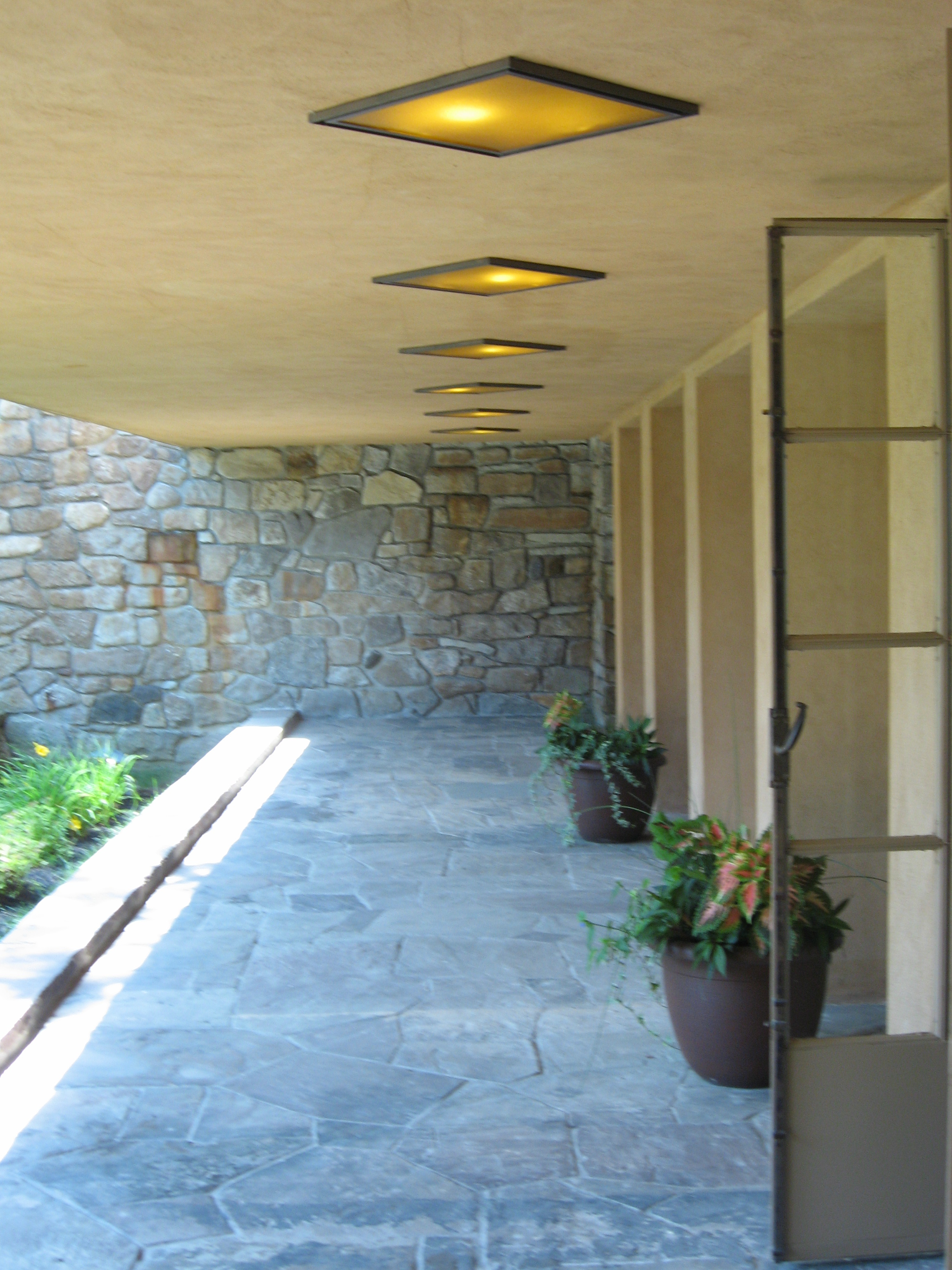
South Terrace

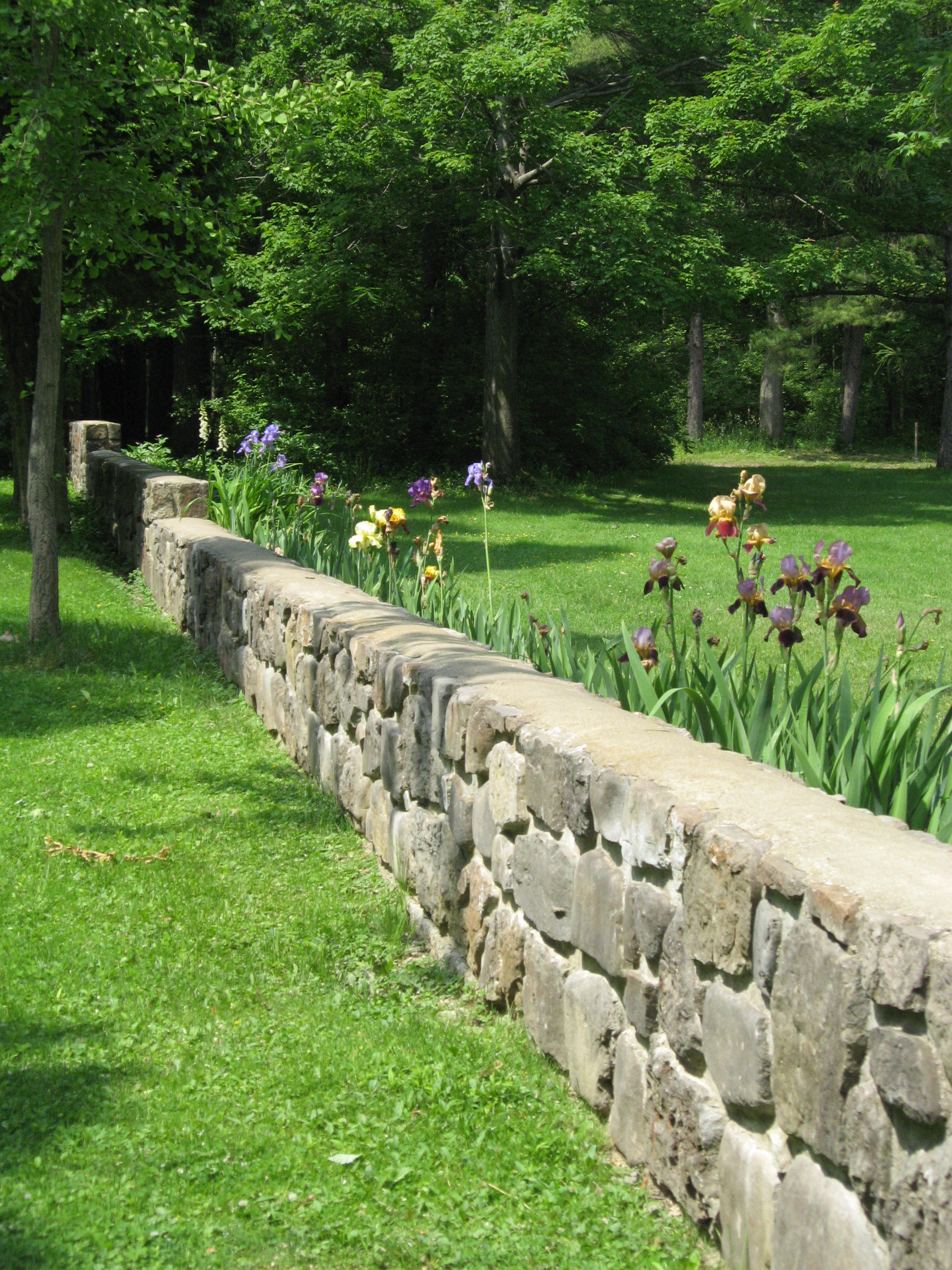
Stone walls at Graycliff

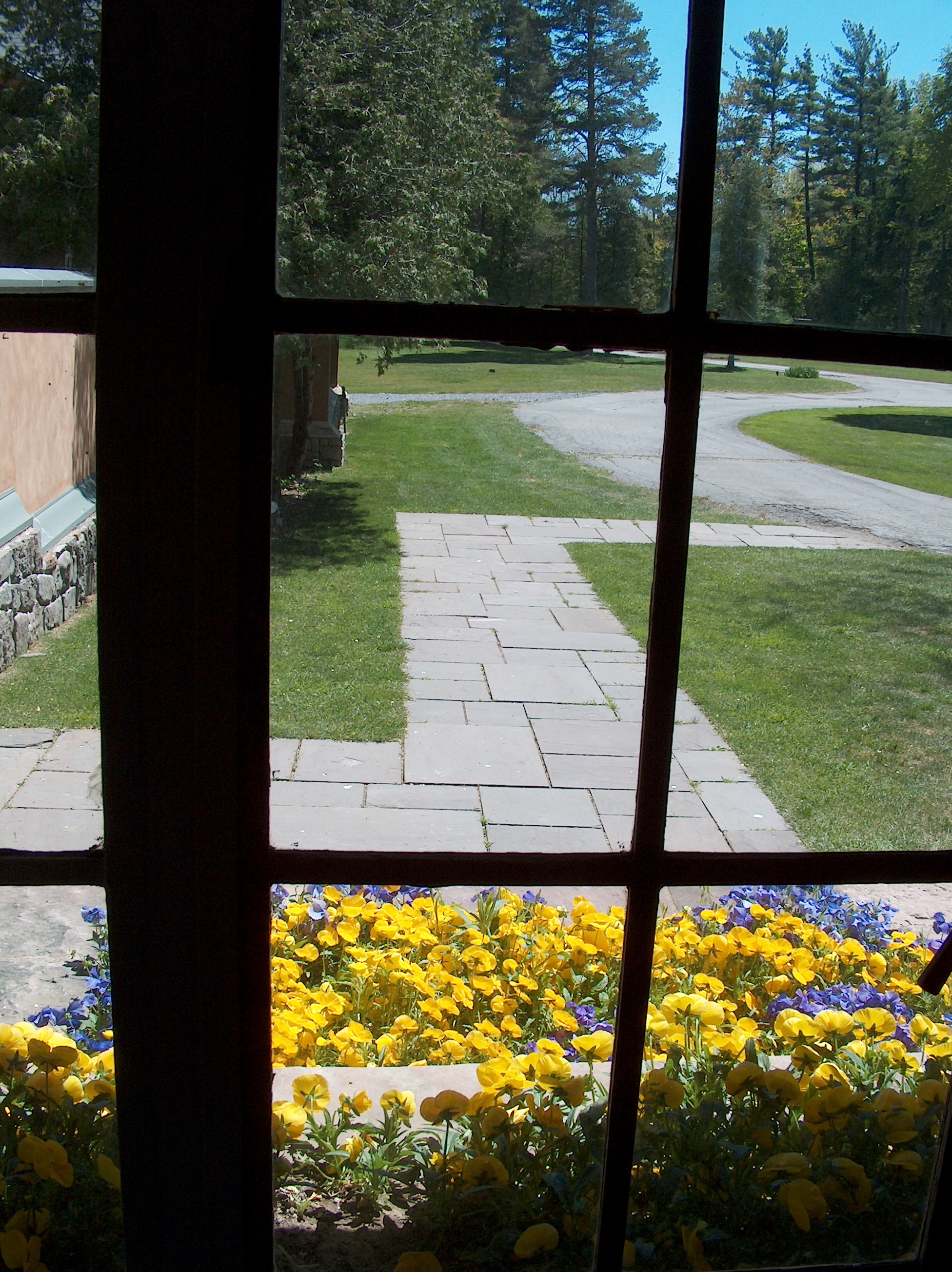
View through the kitchen window

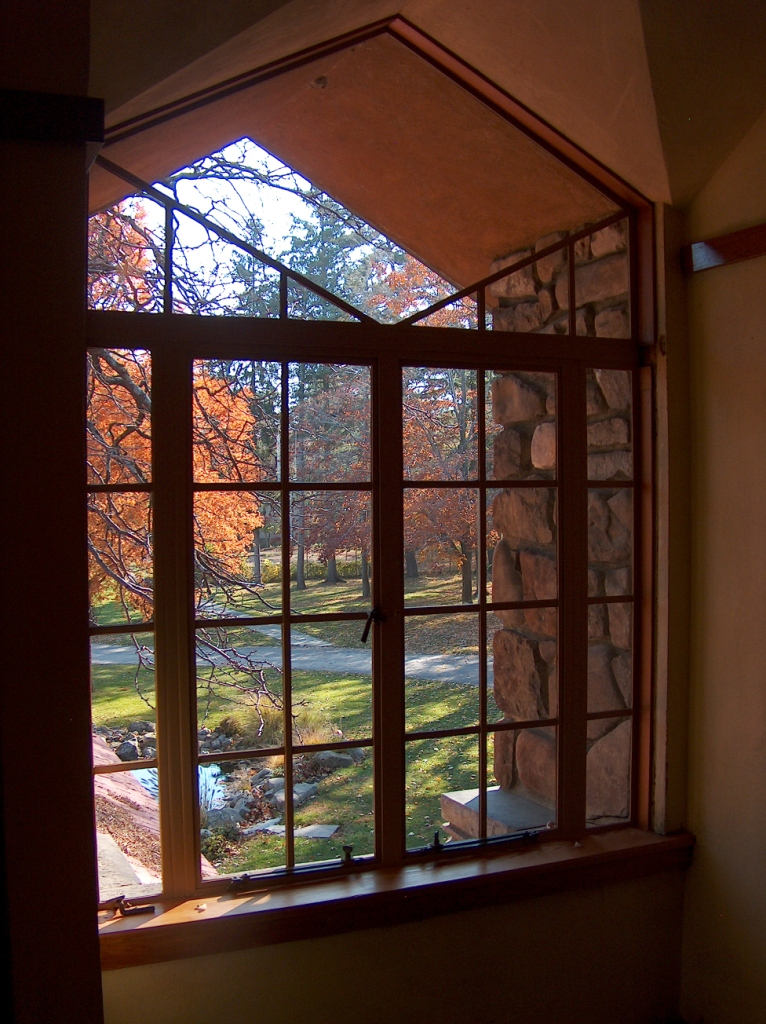
Diamond window

== See also ==
- List of Frank Lloyd Wright works
- National Register of Historic Places in Erie County, New York
- Joseph Slawinski

Other buildings by Frank Lloyd Wright in the Buffalo area:

- Larkin Administration Building (demolished)
- Darwin D. Martin House
- William R. Heath House
- Walter V. Davidson House
- Blue Sky Mausoleum
- Fontana Boathouse(in Slovak)
