= Angola on the Lake, New York =

Angola on the Lake
- Census-designated place
- Location in Erie County and the state of New York
- Coordinates: 42°39′17″N 79°2′56″W
- Country: United States
- State: New York
- County: Erie
- Town: Evans

Area
  - Total: 2.54 sq mi (6.59 km^{2})
  - Land: 2.54 sq mi (6.59 km^{2})
  - Water: 0 sq mi (0.00 km^{2})
- Elevation: 600 ft (183 m)

Population (2020)
  - Total: 1,481
  - Density: 582/sq mi (224.7/km^{2})
- Time zone: UTC-5 (Eastern (EST))
  - Summer (DST): UTC-4 (EDT)
- ZIP Code: 14006 (Angola)
- FIPS code: 36-02220
- GNIS feature ID: 1867392

Angola on the Lake is a hamlet and census-designated place (CDP) in Erie County, New York, United States. As of the 2020 census, Angola on the Lake had a population of 1,481. It is part of the Buffalo-Niagara Falls metropolitan area.

Angola on the Lake is in the town of Evans and is west of the village of Angola. The hamlet is located on the eastern shore of Lake Erie.

== Geography ==
Angola on the Lake is located at 42°39′17″N 79°02′56″W.

According to the United States Census Bureau, the CDP has a total area of 2.5 square miles (6.6 km^{2}), all land.

== Demographics ==
Historical population
Census	Pop.	Note	%±
2020	1,481		—
U.S. Decennial Census

As of the census of 2000, there were 1,771 people, 757 households, and 480 families living in the village. The population density was 701.4 inhabitants per square mile (270.8/km^{2}). There were 943 housing units at an average density of 373.5 per square mile (144.2/km^{2}). The racial makeup of the CDP was 98.76% White, 0.34% African American, 0.28% Native American, 0.06% from other races, and 0.56% from two or more races. Hispanic or Latino of any race were 0.85% of the population.

There were 757 households, out of which 23.9% had children under the age of 18 living with them, 49.7% were married couples living together, 10.0% had a female householder with no husband present, and 36.5% were non-families. 32.2% of all households were made up of individuals, and 12.7% had someone living alone who was 65 years of age or older. The average household size was 2.34 and the average family size was 2.95.

In the community, the population was spread out, with 20.9% under the age of 18, 6.6% from 18 to 24, 28.9% from 25 to 44, 27.4% from 45 to 64, and 16.2% who were 65 years of age or older. The median age was 41 years. For every 100 females, there were 91.7 males. For every 100 females age 18 and over, there were 89.6 males.

The median income for a household in the village was $28,641, and the median income for a family was $38,167. Males had a median income of $29,167 versus $22,750 for females. The per capita income for the CDP was $19,319. About 12.4% of families and 13.0% of the population were below the poverty line, including 19.3% of those under age 18 and 1.5% of those age 65 or over.
