= Evans, New York =

- Town
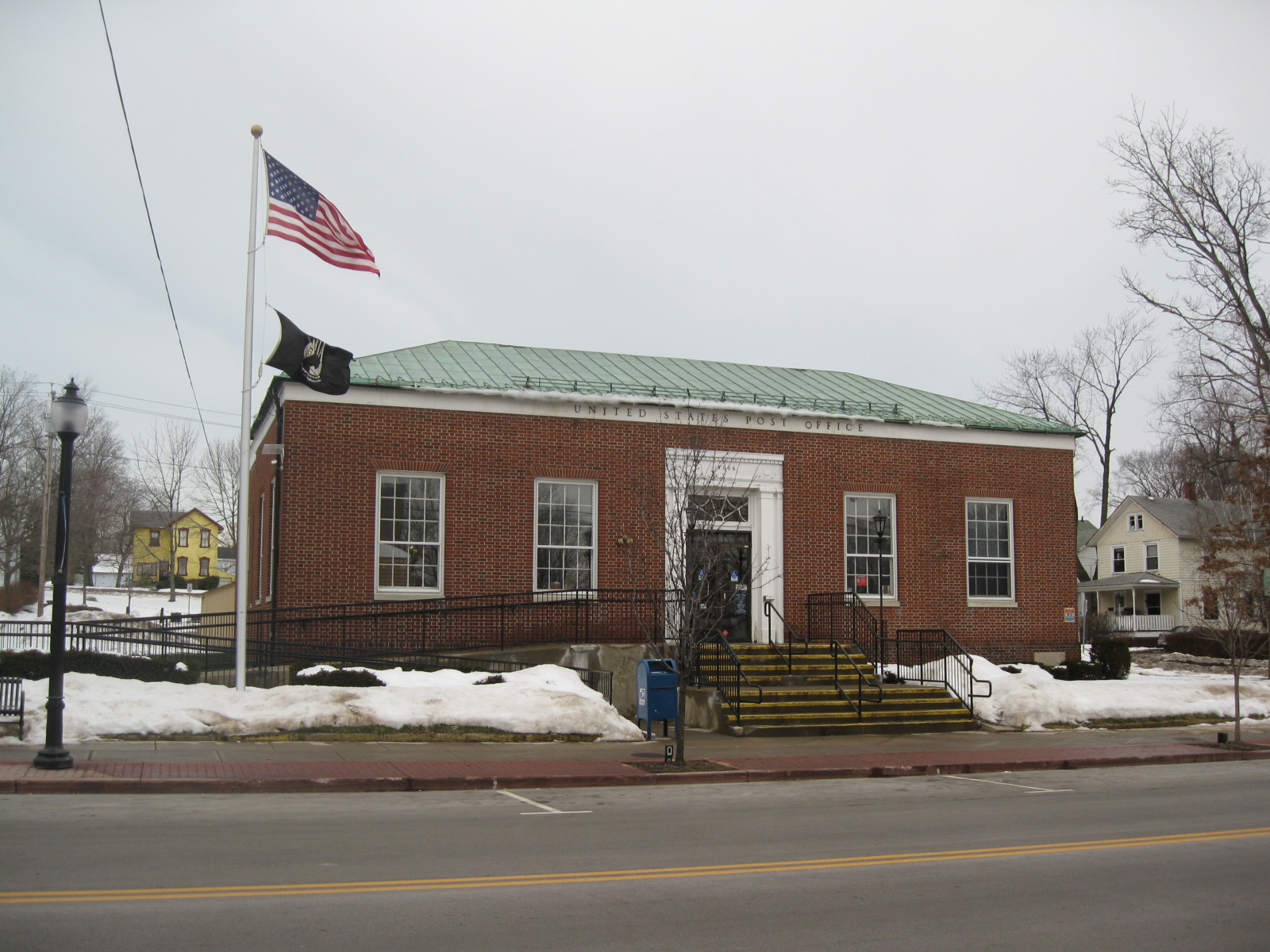
- U.S. Post Office, Angola, NY

- Seal Logo

- Location in Erie County and the state of New York.

- Location of New York in the United States
- Coordinates: 42°38′46″N 79°01′59″W
- Country: United States
- State: New York
- County: Erie
- Incorporated: 1821
- Named after: David Evans

Government
  - Supervisor: Mary Hosler Town Council: Thomas George; Mike Schraft; Jeanne Macko; Laurie Reitz

Area
  - Total: 41.56 sq mi (107.64 km^{2})
  - Land: 41.53 sq mi (107.56 km^{2})
  - Water: 0.031 sq mi (0.08 km^{2})
- Elevation: 676 ft (206 m)

Population (2020)
  - Total: 15,308 ▼
  - Density: 389.9/sq mi (150.53/km^{2})
- Time zone: UTC-5 (EST)
  - Summer (DST): UTC-4 (EDT)
- ZIP Codes: 14006 (Angola); 14047 (Derby); 14112 (North Evans); 14057 (Eden); 14111 (North Collins)
- Area code: 716
- FIPS code: 36-029-24801
- FIPS code: 36-24801
- GNIS feature ID: 0978947
- Website: www.townofevans.org

Evans is a town in Erie County, New York, United States. The population was 16,356 at the 2010 census. The town derives its name from David E. Evans, an agent of the Holland Land Company and nephew of land agent Joseph Ellicott.

The town is approximately 20 miles (32 km) southwest of Buffalo and is a rural community with 12 miles (19 km) of waterfront. The town is located close to the major trading centers of the Northeast and is a bi-national gateway for commerce due to the region's border location with Canada.

== History ==
The town of Evans was established in 1821 from part of the town of Eden. The first settler arrived circa 1804, but there was no permanent settlement until 1808. David Evans was named the local agent of the Holland Land Company in 1827. He was known for his humane management of the company business in relation to the impoverished settlers.

== Geography ==
According to the United States Census Bureau, the town has a total area of 41.56 square miles (107.64 km^{2}), of which 41.53 square miles (107.56 km^{2}) is land and 0.031 square miles (0.08 km^{2}), or 0.08%, is water.

The New York State Thruway (Interstate 90), US 20 (Southwestern Boulevard), and NY 5 (Erie Road) pass through the town.

The north town line is defined by Eighteen Mile Creek, which is well known for excellent fossil formations. Lake Erie defines the west town line.

=== Neighboring towns ===
The town of Brant is to the south, Hamburg is to the northeast, and the town of Eden is to the east.

== Communities and locations ==
- Angola – A village in the south part of the town.
- Angola Lake Shore Addition – A community in the southwest part of the town.
- Angola on the Lake – A lakeside community by Lake Erie.
- Bennett Beach – A lakeside park west of Evans Center.
- Camp Lakeland – A lakeside community by Lake Erie.
- Camp Pioneer – A lakeside community by Lake Erie.
- Derby – A hamlet in the northwestern part of the town.
- Evans Beach Park – A hamlet on the lake shore west of Angola.
- Evans Center – A hamlet on NY-5 north of Angola.
- Evangola State Park – A small part of the state park is at the town's south line.
- Grandview Bay – A lakeside hamlet west of Angola.
- Highland-on-the-Lake – A lakeside hamlet on NY-5.
- Jerusalem Corners – A hamlet in the western part of the town.
- Lake Erie Beach – A lakeside hamlet southwest of Angola.
- North Evans – A hamlet in the northeastern corner of the town.
- Pontiac – A location near the eastern town line.
- Wendt Beach Park – A lakeside park north of Camp Lakeland.

== Demographics ==
Historical population
Census	Pop.	Note	%±
1830	1,185		—
1840	1,807		52.5%
1850	2,182		20.8%
1860	2,510		15.0%
1870	2,593		3.3%
1880	2,610		0.7%
1890	2,692		3.1%
1900	2,795		3.8%
1910	3,124		11.8%
1920	3,468		11.0%
1930	3,827		10.4%
1940	5,047		31.9%
1950	7,663		51.8%
1960	12,078		57.6%
1970	14,570		20.6%
1980	17,961		23.3%
1990	17,478		−2.7%
2000	17,594		0.7%
2010	16,356		−7.0%
2020	15,308		−6.4%
U.S. Decennial Census

As of the census of 2000, there were 14,070 people, 6,639 households, and 4,773 families residing in the town. The population density was 420.5 inhabitants per square mile (162.4/km^{2}). There were 7,507 housing units at an average density of 179.4 per square mile (69.3/km^{2}). The racial makeup of the town was 97.81% White, 0.38% African American, 0.62% Native American, 0.20% Asian, 0.02% Pacific Islander, 0.19% from other races, and 0.78% from two or more races. Hispanic or Latino of any race were 1.20% of the population.

There were 6,639 households, out of which 34.8% had children under the age of 18 living with them, 56.4% were married couples living together, 11.0% had a female householder with no husband present, and 28.1% were non-families. 23.5% of all households were made up of individuals, and 10.1% had someone living alone who was 65 years of age or older. The average household size was 2.63 and the average family size was 3.11.

In the town, the population was spread out, with 26.3% under the age of 18, 6.8% from 18 to 24, 29.4% from 25 to 44, 25.2% from 45 to 64, and 12.3% who were 65 years of age or older. The median age was 38 years. For every 100 females, there were 95.3 males. For every 100 females age 18 and over, there were 92.3 males.

The median income for a household in the town was $43,142, and the median income for a family was $50,765. Males had a median income of $39,022 versus $26,698 for females. The per capita income for the town was $19,122. About 5.4% of families and 7.0% of the population were below the poverty line, including 8.8% of those under age 18 and 5.3% of those age 65 or over.

== Parks and recreation ==
The Town's waterfront location has also made it a popular spot for tourism and recreation, especially during the summer months. Bennett Beach and Wendt Beach Park are popular recreation and tourism spots in the town. Sturgeon Point Marina is also a popular recreation spot in the town. A small part of Evangola State Park lies within the town at the south town line.

== Government ==
Evans is served by five volunteer fire departments, which are Highland Hose, North Evans, Evans Center, Angola and Lake Erie Beach.

Police services are provided by the Evans Police Department. The Marine Rescue and Recovery Unit of the Evans Police Department responds to calls for assistance in water and ice rescue situations, including drowning or possible drowning, boating accidents, and recovery of property and bodies. The Evans Police have two Humvees for inclement weather and search and rescue operations. The Department acquired these vehicles through the 1033 program. The Town of Evans Communications Center dispatches Emergency Services for Brant Police and Fire Departments, Towns of Collins, North Collins, Village of North Collins and Seneca Nation Territory. Over all 13 fire companies and two EMS companies.

== Education ==
The town has one high school, one middle school, three elementary schools and an educational center (formerly an elementary school).

== Notable people ==
- Willis Carrier, inventor of air conditioning
- Alfred Gray, former Kansas legislator
- Patrick Kaleta, ice hockey player for the Buffalo Sabres of the NHL
- Christian Laettner, former NBA player
- Nathaniel O. Murray, Wisconsin State Assemblyman and steamboat owner
- Francis J. Pordum, former New York state assemblyman, served as Town Supervisor
- A. W. Shepard, former college football head coach, lived in North Evans
