= Evangola State Park =

State park in Erie County, New York

- Location within New York
- Type: State park
- Location: 10191 Old Lake Shore Road; Irving, New York
- Nearest city: Farnham, New York
- Coordinates: 42°36′05″N 79°04′57″W
- Area: 733 acres (2.97 km^{2})
- Created: 1954
- Operator: New York State Office of Parks, Recreation and Historic Preservation
- Visitors: 139,804 (in 2014)
- Open: All year
- Camp sites: 80
- Website: Evangola State Park

Evangola State Park is a 733-acre (2.97 km^{2}) state park in southern Erie County, New York, United States. The park is located west of the Village of Farnham, at the border of the Town of Brant and the Town of Evans. The park, which opened in 1954, fronts on Lake Erie, and has a large swimming beach bordered by cliffs of Angola shale.

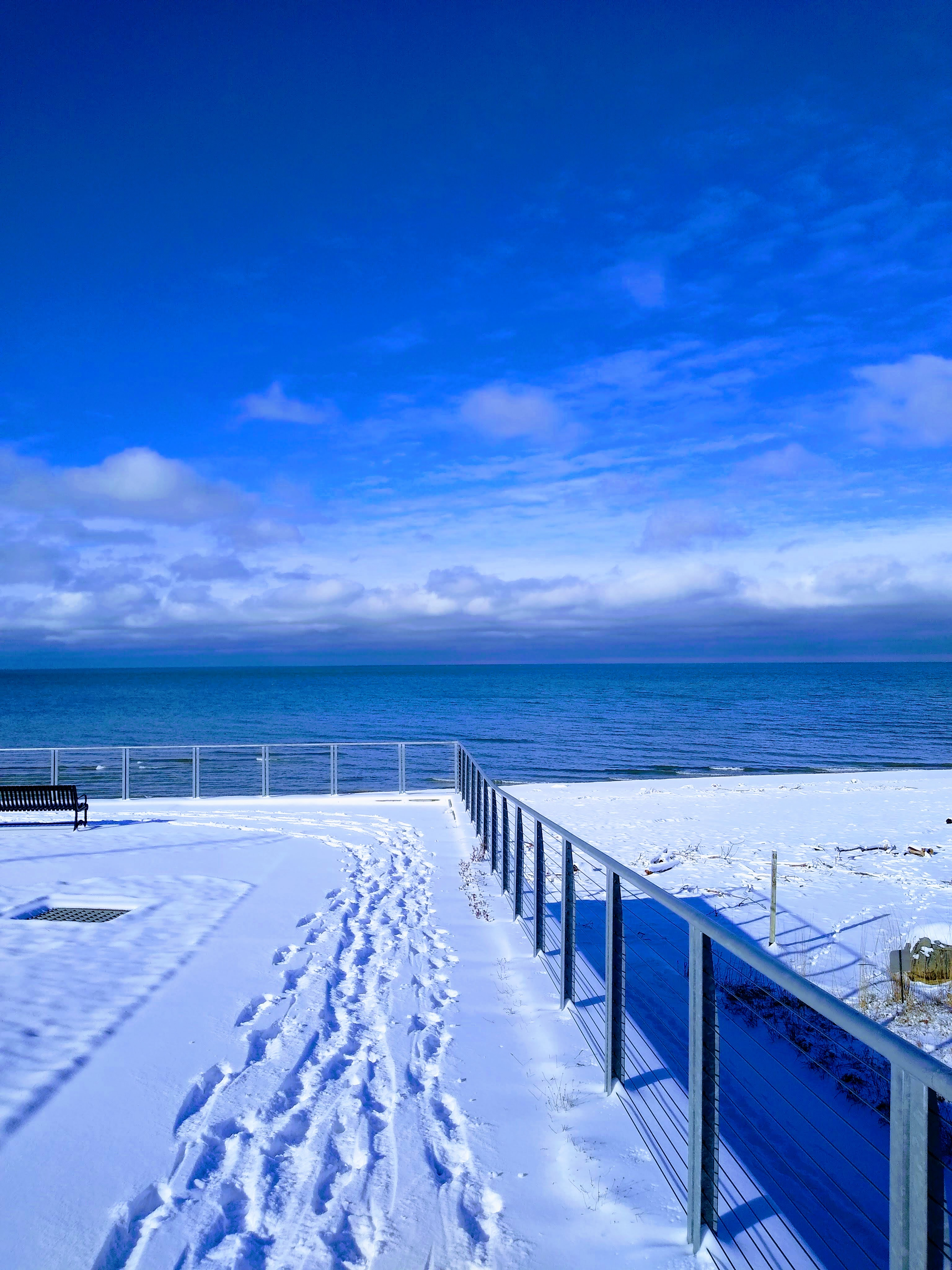
Park overlooking beach in winter near flagstand

== Park description ==
Evangola State Park is open year-round from dawn to dusk, and offers a beach, picnic tables and pavilions, seasonal pheasant and small game hunting, hiking and biking, nature trails (park wildlife includes white-tailed deer, raccoons, turkey, and red-tailed hawks), a playground and playing fields (baseball, tennis, basketball), a disc golf course, fishing, ice-fishing, snowmobiling, cross-country skiing, and snowshoeing. The park's swimming beach was identified as the second-least polluted beach in Erie County based on water sampling in 2013.

From mid-April to late October, 80 campsites are available for public use, offering both tent options and trailer sites. Flush toilets and hot showers are available in the park. There is also 5 yurts that sleeps six. In 2007, Evangola was named one of the Top 100 campgrounds in the nation by ReserveAmerica.

The park is also available for weddings, and includes a gazebo overlooking Lake Erie. There is also a 125-person banquet room overlooking the beach. The park hosts the Tomato Festival each year on the last full weekend of August.

The park also offers a variety of programs led by park naturalists. Programs include nature hikes, dragonfly surveying, bird watching, sandcastle contests, nature center workshops, fishing programs and marsh studies. All programs are free of charge and usually meet at the Nature Center located in the campground area.

New York State Route 5 passes through the eastern part of the park.

== See also ==
- List of New York state parks
