= Derby, New York =

Hamlet in New York, United States

Coordinates: 42°40′53″N 78°58′31″W

Derby is a hamlet in Erie County, New York, United States. It is the postal address for much of the town of Evans, within which Derby is fully contained. The Derby ZIP code is 14047, and includes the neighborhood of Highland-on-the-Lake. Derby is also home to the North Evans Fire District which includes Highland Hose Volunteer Fire Company and the North Evans Volunteer Fire Company. Derby is home to Highland Elementary School, part of the Lake Shore School District.

Derby's retail district is centered on, and around, Erie Road (New York State Route 5) and includes a variety of stores and services including a Rite Aid, Tops Friendly Market, McDonald's, Autozone, the Derby Animal Hospital, Derby Optical Tim Hortons coffee shop, The Bagel Jar, and The Network Consulting Group of WNY ^{[11]}.

Derby is located on the shores of Lake Erie in the southwest part of Erie County and 18 miles (29 km) southwest of Buffalo. In the first quarter of the 20th century, many wealthy Buffalo families (i.e. Larkin, Kellogg, Schoellkopf, Mann, Trubee, Esty, Schmidt, Coit) built their summer estates there, including one called "Graycliff" designed by Frank Lloyd Wright for the family of Darwin Martin, an executive at the Larkin Soap Company. Also at Derby is the historic First Church of Evans Complex.
