= Jewettville, New York =

Hamlet in New York, United States

Coordinates: 42°43′25″N 78°40′53″W

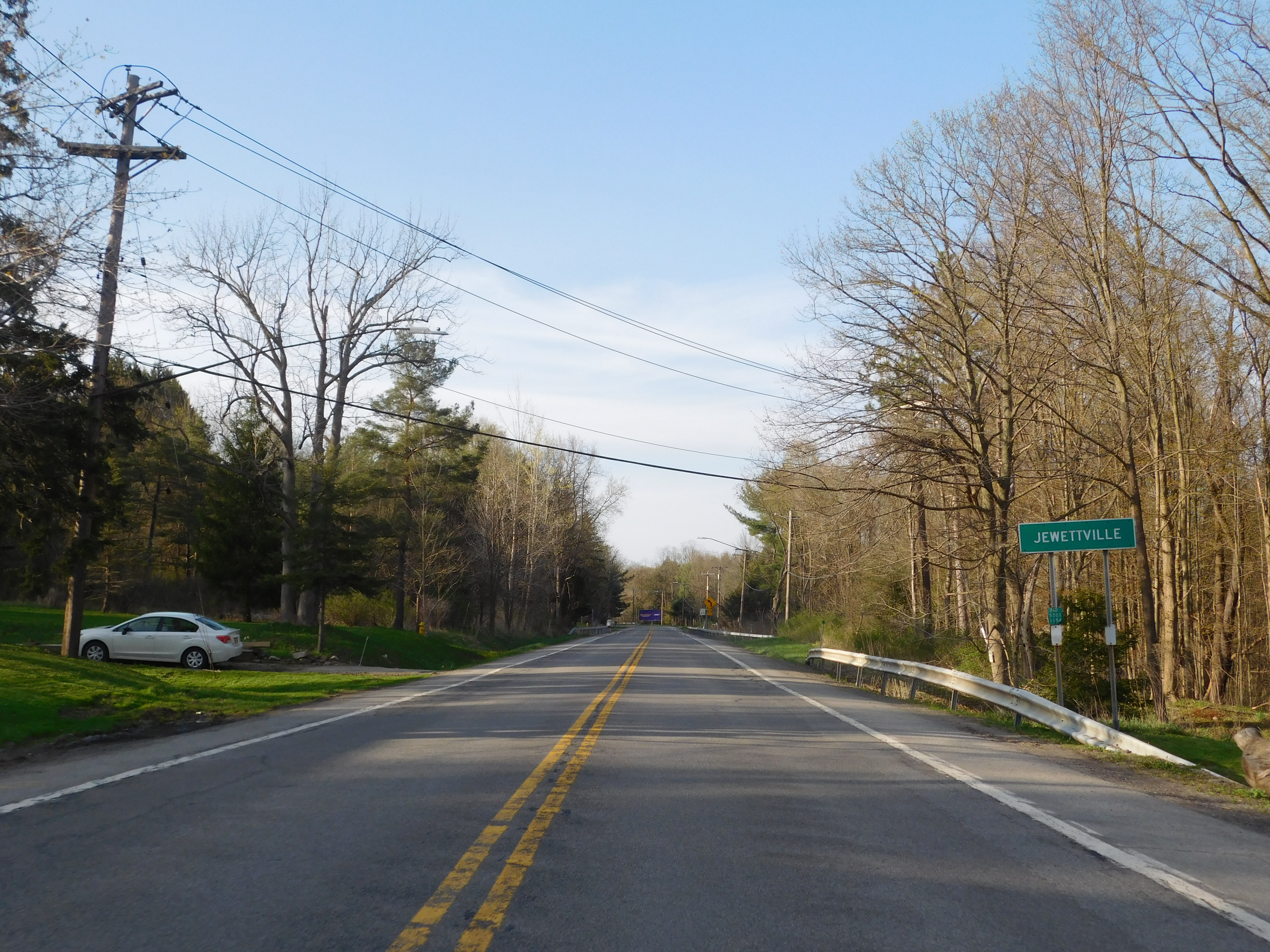
NY 240 northbound entering Jewettville

Jewettville is a hamlet in the town of Aurora in Erie County, New York, United States.
