= Jerusalem Corners, New York =

Hamlet in New York, United States

Coordinates: 42°40′59″N 79°00′54″W

Jerusalem Corners is a hamlet in the town of Evans in Erie County, New York, United States.
