= Jeddo, New York =

- Hamlet
- Location within New York Location within the United States
- Coordinates: 43°15′19″N 78°27′26″W
- Country: United States
- State: New York
- County: Orleans
- Elevation: 413 ft (126 m)

Jeddo is a hamlet in Orleans County, New York, United States. The settlement was established upon lots 40 and 41 along the Ridge Road in the town of Ridgeway on land granted to Seymour Murdock, James Sheldon, Samuel P. Judson, Zephaniah Judson, Amos Spencer, and William McCormick. After Orlando Bates constructed a stone grist mill at this location in 1827, the settlement was named Batesville. When residents discussed the addition of a post office to their community, a meeting was held in order to decide upon a name. Although several names were proposed, no consensus was met until a young schoolboy proposed the name Jeddo. Assumed to be a joke, the crowd adopted the name and disbanded the meeting. Shortly after, Zechariah Haskins received notice of his appointment as postmaster of Jeddo and the settlement's name was solidified.

To power the grist mill, and later a saw mill, a ditch was constructed across Ridge Road and a small waterfall was created to provide ample energy. This cleared swampy land to the south of the road, opening additional land for farming. The settlement was also home to a Seventh-day Adventist Church organized in 1871 and a Baptist church organized in 1887.
