= Nathaniel O. Murray =

American politician

Nanthaniel Orlando Murray (February 7, 1834 – July 27, 1882) was an American steamboat owner and politician.

Born in Evans, Erie County, New York, Evans settled in Wisconsin in 1848. He lived in Fox Lake, Wisconsin. In 1855, Murray moved to Pepin, Pepin County, Wisconsin. Murray managed a steamboat on Lake Pepin. Murray served as justice of the peace. He also served as sheriff and under sheriff for Pepin County. In 1882, Murray served in the Wisconsin State Assembly and was a Republican. Murray died in Lake City, Iowa while still in office.
