= Buffalo Niagara Region =

Coordinates: 43°00′N 79°00′W

- Eight-county region
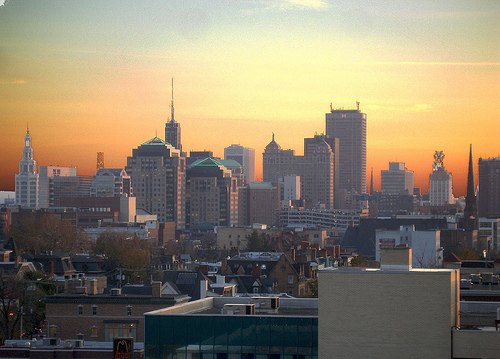
Buffalo
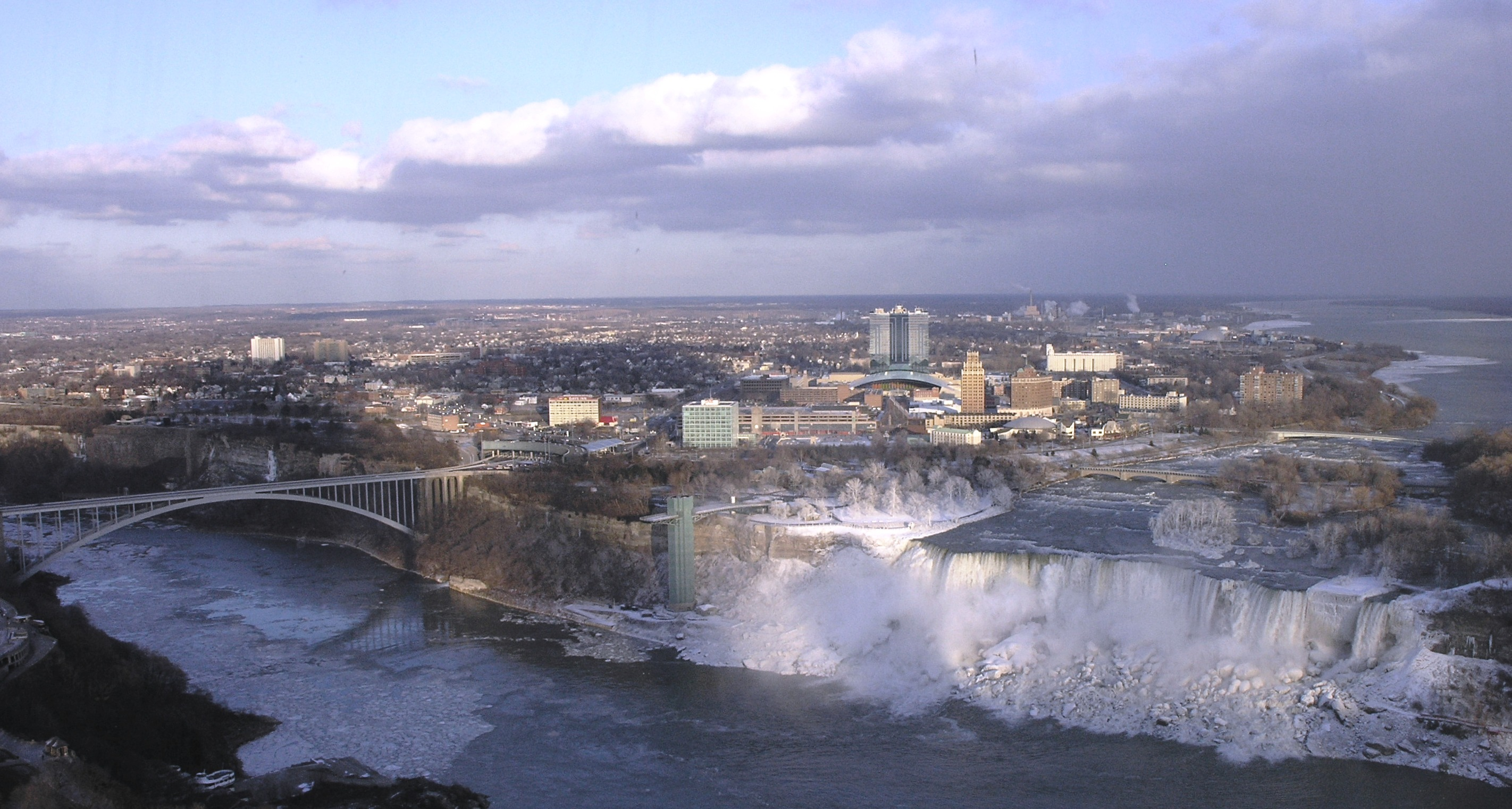
Niagara Falls
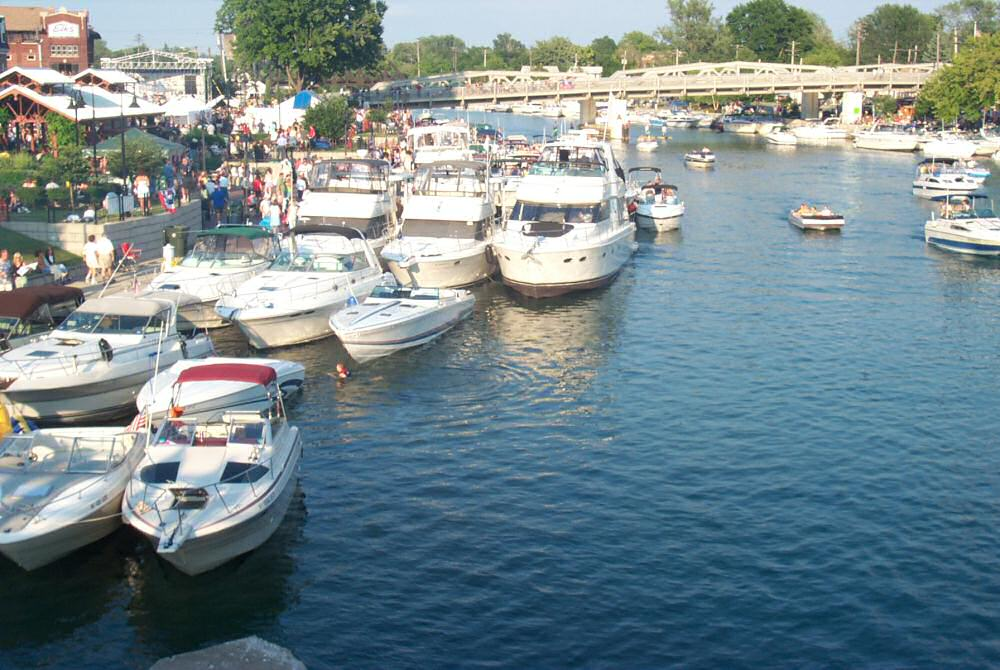
North Tonawanda
- Buffalo Niagara Region within New York State
- Country: United States
- State: New York
- Major cities: List: Buffalo; Niagara Falls; Tonawanda; Lockport; Dunkirk; Olean; Lackawanna; North Tonawanda; Jamestown; Salamanca; Batavia

Area
  - Metro: 5,413 sq mi (14,020 km^{2})
- Highest elevation at Alma Hill: 2,548 ft (777 m)

Population (April 1, 2020)
  - Eight-county region: 1,557,319
- Time zone: UTC−5 (Eastern)
  - Summer (DST): UTC−4 (EDT)

The Buffalo Niagara Region is an economic region that is part of the Great Lakes region of North America, comprising much of Western New York in the United States. The Regional Institute of the University at Buffalo has defined the region as including the eight westernmost counties in New York.

The 8 counties in the region, as defined by Invest Buffalo Niagara, are:

- Allegany County, New York
- Cattaraugus County, New York
- Chautauqua County, New York
- Erie County, New York
- Genesee County, New York
- Niagara County, New York
- Orleans County, New York
- Wyoming County, New York

== See also ==
- Western New York
- Southern Ontario
- Niagara Frontier
- Holland Purchase
- Finger Lakes
- Southern Tier
- Central New York
- Golden Horseshoe
