= Java Village, New York =

- Hamlet
- Location within New York Location within the United States
- Coordinates: 42°40′21″N 78°26′10″W
- Country: United States
- State: New York
- County: Wyoming
- Elevation: 1,089 ft (332 m)
- Time zone: UTC-5 (Eastern (EST))
  - Summer (DST): UTC-4 (EDT)
- ZIP code: 14083
- Area code: 585
- GNIS feature ID: 953945

Java Village is a hamlet in Wyoming County, New York, United States. The community is located along New York State Route 78, 9.6 miles (15.4 km) north of Arcade. Java Village had a post office with ZIP code 14083, which opened in 1826.
