= Angola, New York =

- Village
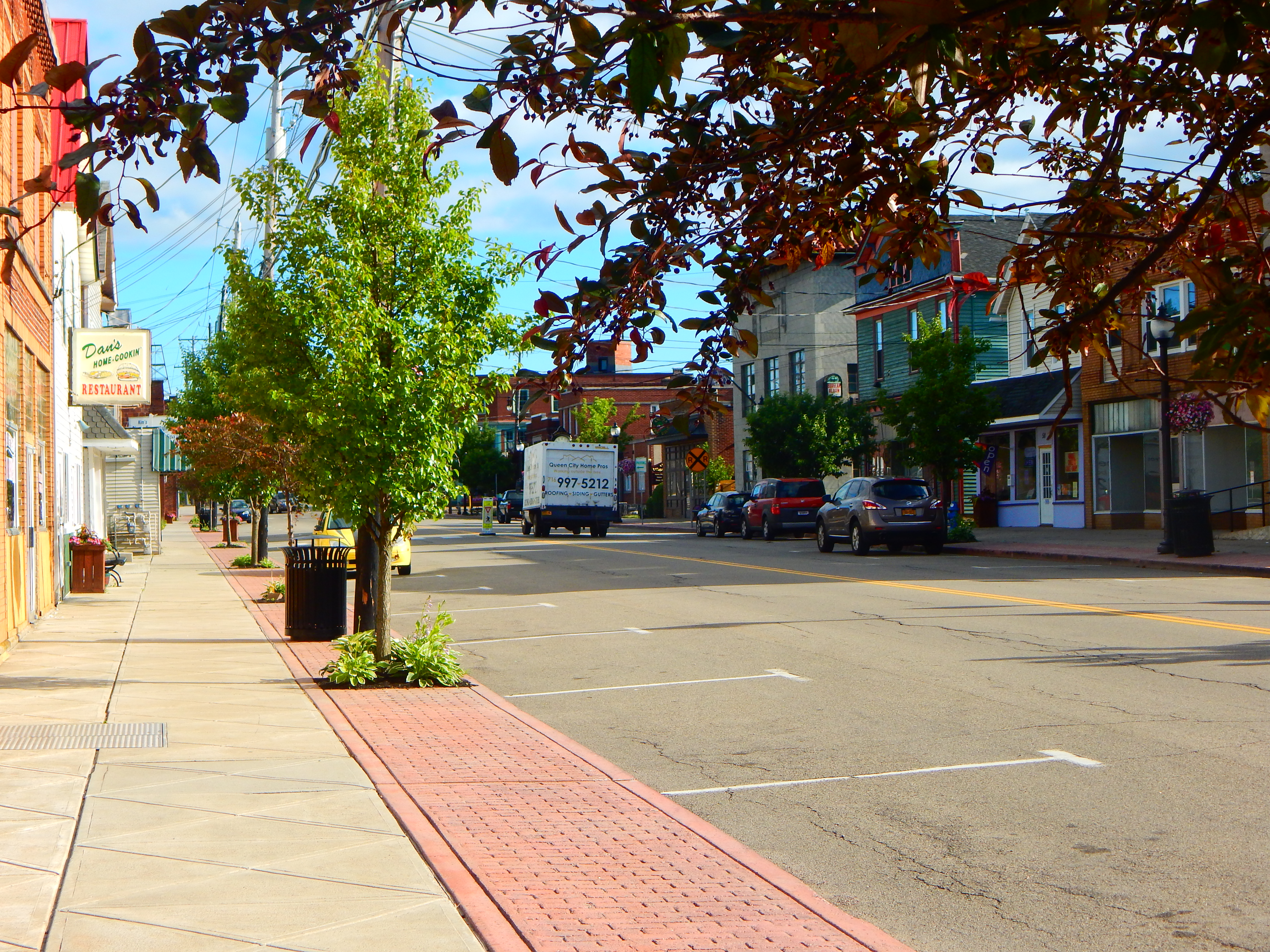
- Main Street (Erie County Route 9) through downtown Angola

- Seal

- Location in Erie County and the state of New York
- Coordinates: 42°38′18″N 79°1′40″W
- Country: United States
- State: New York
- County: Erie
- Town: Evans
- Named for: Angola

Area
  - Total: 1.42 sq mi (3.67 km^{2})
  - Land: 1.42 sq mi (3.67 km^{2})
  - Water: 0 sq mi (0.00 km^{2})
- Elevation: 686 ft (209 m)

Population (2020)
  - Total: 2,046
  - Density: 1,444.3/sq mi (557.63/km^{2})
- Time zone: UTC-5 (Eastern (EST))
  - Summer (DST): UTC-4 (EDT)
- ZIP code: 14006
- Area code: 716
- FIPS code: 36-02198
- Website: www.villageofangolany.gov

Angola is a village in the town of Evans in Erie County, New York, United States. Located 2 miles (3 km) east of Lake Erie, the village is 22 miles (35 km) southwest of downtown Buffalo. As of the 2020 census, Angola had a population of 2,046. An unincorporated community known as Angola on the Lake, with a population of 1,675, lies between Angola village and Lake Erie.

== History ==
The community was previously called "Evans Station". Around 1854 or 1855, the earliest recorded reference to Angola is in an 1822 publication, when it was one of 3 townships divided from Collins. A post office was established there in 1822 bearing the name "Angola". The first postmaster was Jacob Taylor, a Quaker. The new name was apparently chosen because, at that time, local residents (primarily Quakers) were supporting missionary efforts in the Portuguese colony of Angola in Africa. The economy of the village improved with the arrival of a railroad line in 1852.

The Village of Angola was incorporated in 1873. In June 2004, an attempt to dissolve the village was thwarted by a judicial ruling that the petitions for a referendum were invalid. In 2007, the village agreed to dissolve its police department and contract with the Town of Evans for police services. Angola officers would be hired by Evans.

In February 2008, local officials rejected the urging of local politician Kevin Gaughan to reduce the size of the village board, stating that no financial savings would result. Gaughan, a proponent of reducing the number of government entities in Erie County, is also a proponent of metro government. The US Post Office—Angola was listed on the National Register of Historic Places in 1988.

The Friends of the Village of Angola is a non-profit group of volunteer members whose purpose is to bring more foot traffic to the village. They work to improve and maintain many behind-the-scenes things in Angola. The Friends are responsible for organizing the annual Christmas in the Village, funded by the annual summer Drifters Car Cruise and Donations from individuals and local businesses.

=== Angola Horror train wreck ===
On December 18, 1867, just after 3 pm, the last coach of the Buffalo-bound New York Express of the Lake Shore and Michigan Southern railway derailed. It plunged off a truss bridge into Big Sister Creek just after passing Angola. The next car was also pulled from the track and rolled down the far embankment. Stoves set both coaches on fire. Forty-nine people were killed and an additional forty injured.

== Geography ==
Angola is located in southwestern Erie County at 42°38′21″N 79°1′51″W (42.639109, -79.030709), near the geographic center of the town of Evans. According to the United States Census Bureau, the village has a total area of 1.4 square miles (3.6 km^{2}), all land.

Angola is 2 miles (3 km) east of the shore of Lake Erie and is west of the New York State Thruway (Interstate 90). It is on the New York-Buffalo-Chicago Main Line of CSXT and on the Jersey City-Buffalo-Chicago Main Line of the Norfolk Southern Railway. From 1907 to 1932 Angola was on the Buffalo-to-Erie (Pa.) Main Line of the Buffalo & Lake Erie Traction Company (B&LET) and its successor, the Buffalo & Erie Railway (B&E), a high speed interurban electric railway. The B&E was abandoned with the approval of the New York State Public Service Commission to promote the growth and development of highway transportation.

== Demographics ==
Historical population
Census	Pop.	Note	%±
1860	225		—
1870	600		166.7%
1880	508		−15.3%
1890	650		28.0%
1900	712		9.5%
1910	898		26.1%
1920	1,367		52.2%
1930	1,543		12.9%
1940	1,663		7.8%
1950	1,936		16.4%
1960	2,499		29.1%
1970	2,676		7.1%
1980	2,292		−14.3%
1990	2,231		−2.7%
2000	2,266		1.6%
2010	2,127		−6.1%
2020	2,046		−3.8%
U.S. Decennial Census

=== 2020 census ===
As of the 2020 census, Angola had a population of 2,046. The median age was 42.7 years. 21.2% of residents were under the age of 18 and 18.5% of residents were 65 years of age or older. For every 100 females there were 91.2 males, and for every 100 females age 18 and over there were 89.5 males age 18 and over.

98.1% of residents lived in urban areas, while 1.9% lived in rural areas.

There were 855 households in Angola, of which 28.7% had children under the age of 18 living in them. Of all households, 41.5% were married-couple households, 17.7% were households with a male householder and no spouse or partner present, and 32.7% were households with a female householder and no spouse or partner present. About 29.9% of all households were made up of individuals and 14.6% had someone living alone who was 65 years of age or older.

There were 940 housing units, of which 9.0% were vacant. The homeowner vacancy rate was 1.0% and the rental vacancy rate was 12.5%.

Racial composition as of the 2020 census
Race	Number	Percent
White	1,853	90.6%
Black or African American	30	1.5%
American Indian and Alaska Native	63	3.1%
Asian	2	0.1%
Native Hawaiian and Other Pacific Islander	0	0.0%
Some other race	10	0.5%
Two or more races	88	4.3%
Hispanic or Latino (of any race)	60	2.9%

=== 2000 census ===
As of the 2000 census, there were 2,266 people, 844 households, and 618 families residing in the village. The population density was 1,589.5 inhabitants per square mile (613.7/km^{2}). There were 903 housing units at an average density of 633.4 per square mile (244.6/km^{2}). The racial makeup of the village was 96.60% White, 0.44% African American, 1.32% Native American, 0.35% Asian, 0.40% from other races, and 0.88% from two or more races. Hispanic or Latino of any race were 1.46% of the population.

There were 844 households, out of which 39.5% had children under the age of 18 living with them, 53.2% were married couples living together, 14.7% had a female householder with no husband present, and 26.7% were non-families. 22.3% of all households were made up of individuals, and 11.8% had someone living alone who was 65 years of age or older. The average household size was 2.68 and the average family size was 3.13.

In the village, the population was spread out, with 29.5% under the age of 18, 6.8% from 18 to 24, 29.6% from 25 to 44, 20.6% from 45 to 64, and 13.5% who were 65 years of age or older. The median age was 36 years. For every 100 females, there were 93.2 males. For every 100 females age 18 and over, there were 90.9 males.

The median income for a household in the village was $40,050, and the median income for a family was $48,352. Males had a median income of $37,931 versus $27,298 for females. The per capita income for the village was $17,598. About 7.6% of families and 11.2% of the population were below the poverty line, including 18.8% of those under age 18 and 2.6% of those age 65 or over.

== Economy ==
Goya Foods has its Great Lakes division in Angola.

== Notable people ==
- Willis Carrier, engineer and inventor of air conditioning
- Patrick Kaleta, NHL hockey player
- Christian Laettner, basketball player; 1992 Olympic Gold Medal basketball winner, former NBA basketball player
- Patchy Mix, professional MMA fighter and grappler
- Monroe Salisbury, silent film actor
- Pius Louis Schwert, former Major League Baseball player and U.S. congressman
