= William R. Heath House =

Historic house in Buffalo, New York

- U.S. Historic district – Contributing property
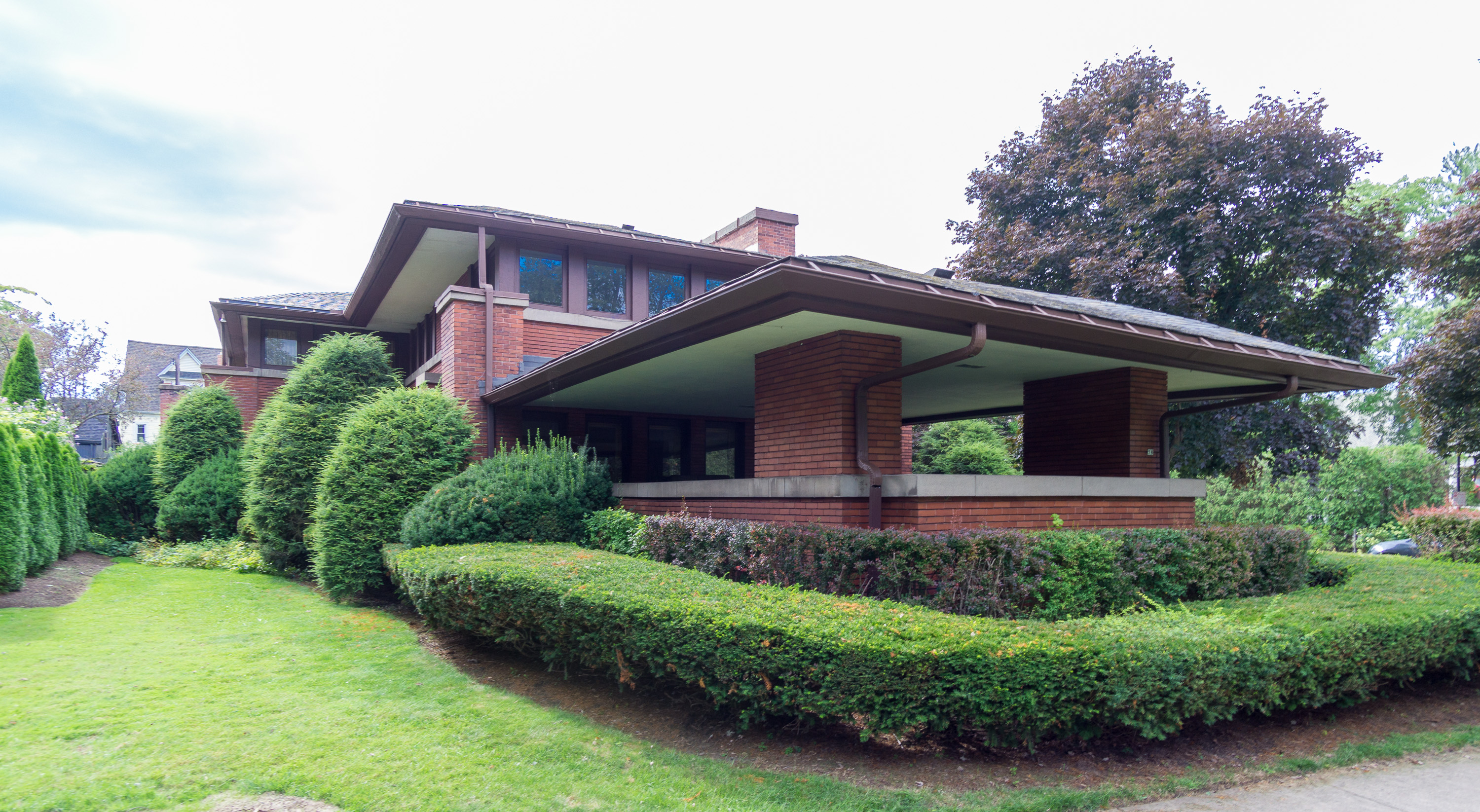
- William R. Heath House in 2019

- Location within New York Location within the United States
- Interactive map showing the William R. Heath House’s location
- Location: 76 Soldiers Place, Buffalo, NY
- Coordinates: 42.925837°N 78.875286°W
- Built: 1904 - 1905
- Architect: Frank Lloyd Wright
- Architectural style: Prairie School
- Part of: Elmwood Historic District–East (ID16000108)

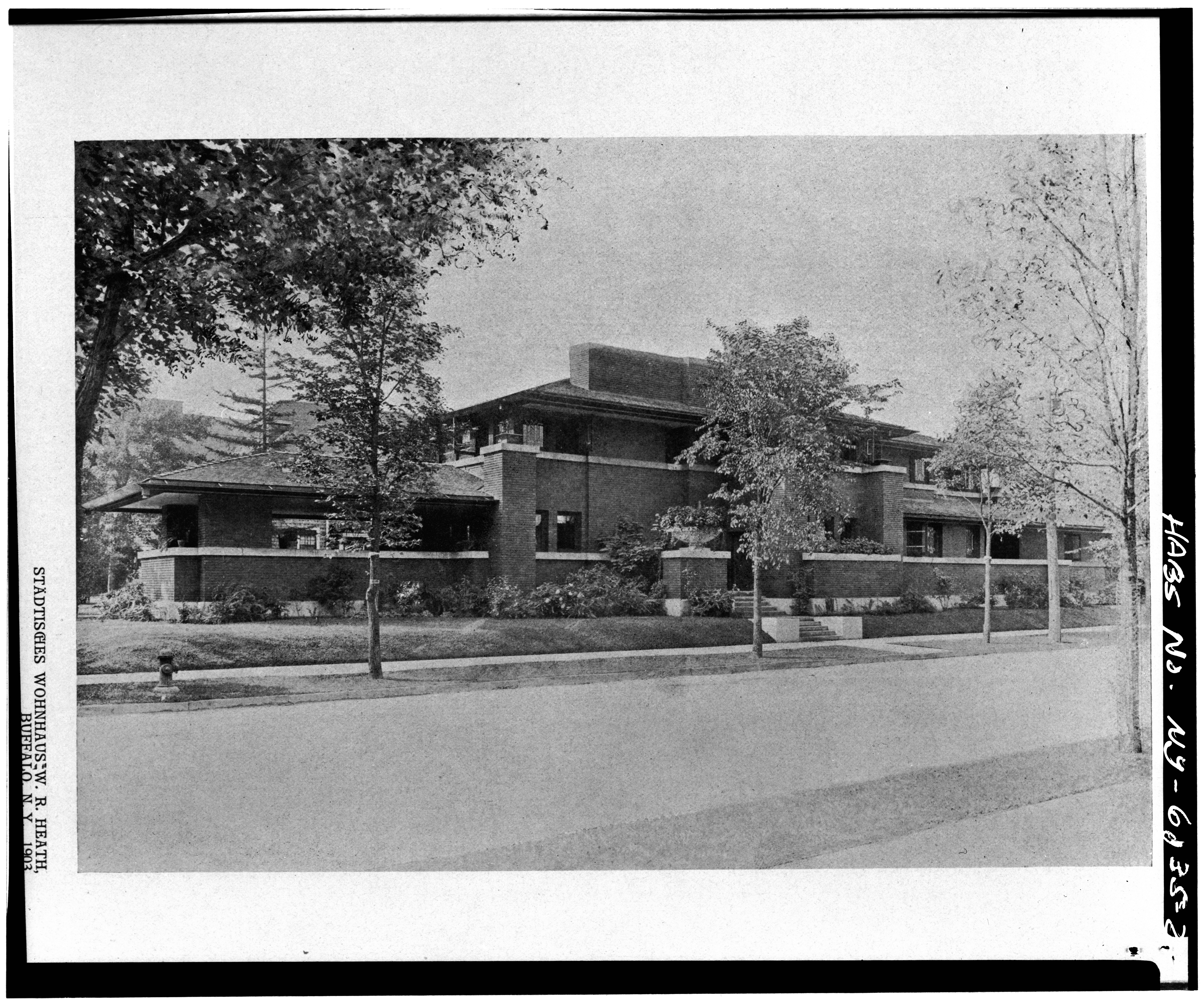

The William R. Heath House was designed by Frank Lloyd Wright, built from 1903 to 1905, and is located at 76 Soldiers Place in Buffalo, New York. It is built in the Prairie School architectural style. It is a contributing property in the Elmwood Historic District–East historic district and a City of Buffalo landmark. It is currently a private residence.

== History ==
William Heath was a lawyer who served as office manager, and eventually vice-president, of the Larkin Company in Buffalo. Heath's wife Mary was a sister of Elbert Hubbard, a former Larkin executive. Another Hubbard sister was married to company president John D. Larkin. Hubbard had retired in 1893 and established the Roycroft Movement, an arts and crafts community in nearby East Aurora.

Heath was introduced to Wright by fellow Larkin Company executive Darwin D. Martin, though Heath was from Chicago and coincidentally had a brother-in-law from Oak Park on the building crew of Wright's J.J. Walser House. Wright had arrived in Buffalo in 1903 to build a house for Martin, and Martin was instrumental in selecting Wright as the architect for the Larkin Administration Building in downtown Buffalo, Wright's first major commercial project. Consequently, Wright was commissioned by Heath to build a house, and in turn by another Larkin employee Walter V. Davidson.

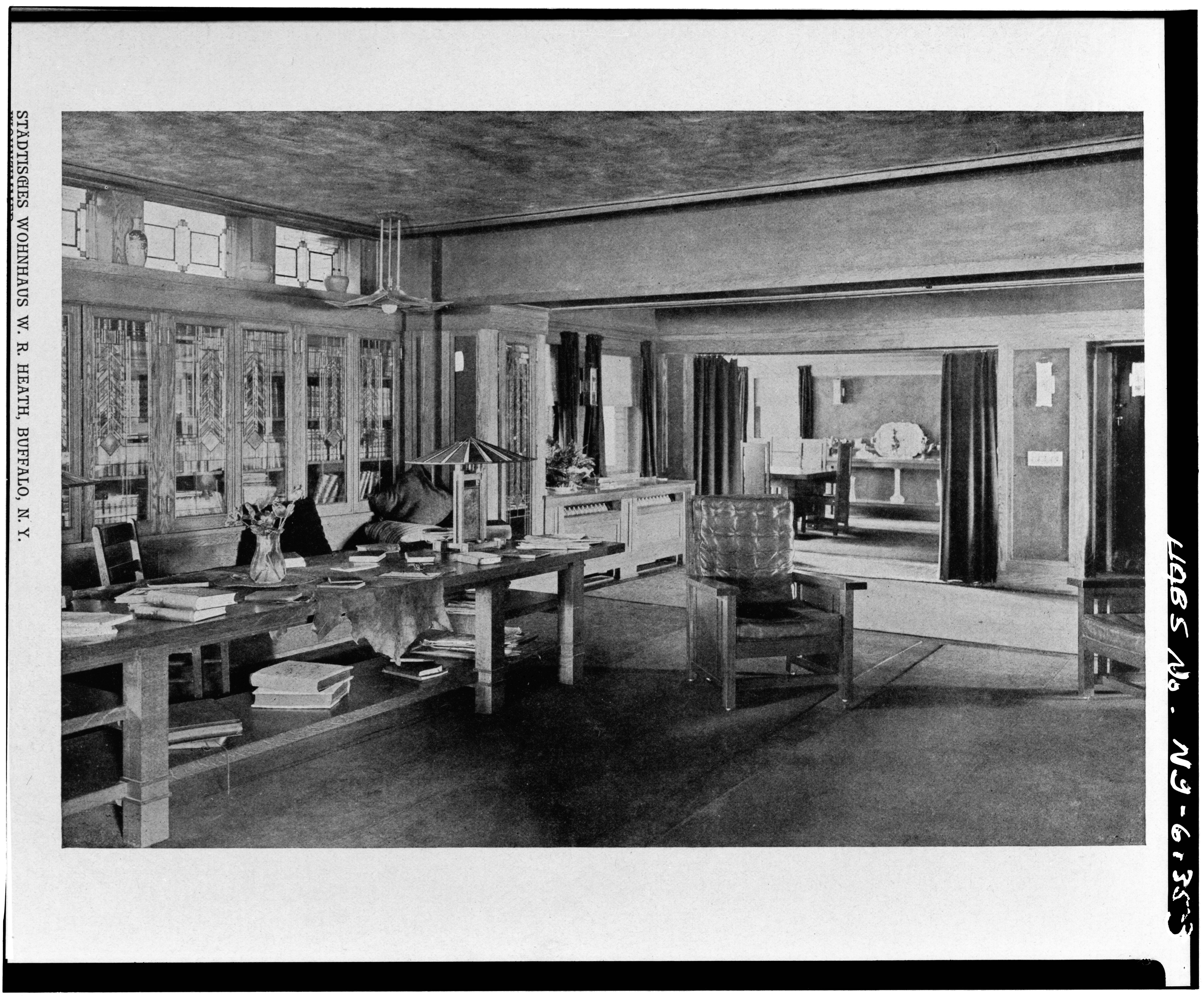
The William R. Heath House living room

Heath's property was a deep and narrow corner lot, facing a large traffic circle, Soldiers Place, which insured that nothing would be built in front of it, and alongside Bird Avenue. This presented Wright with the problem of situating a substantial Prairie house, with its characteristically open structure, in a confined space with twice the street exposure. The house was placed with its long axis right up against the Bird Avenue sidewalk with sections of the traffic circle acting as the grounds that a house of this standing would normally possess.

Although only feet from the sidewalk, the house retains a measure of privacy. Wright elevated the house itself on a terrace above the street level. Hence the ground floor and the window levels of the principal living spaces are higher, restricting the view from Bird Avenue of the inside of the house. The front door is concealed adjacent to a broad chimney and is at a right angle to the street and even with their height the windows are stained glass, both acting as additional screening devices.

The exterior features classic Prairie School elements: a low pitched hip roofs with projecting eaves, a large porch with large square supports, casement windows with art glass, and second-story buttress piers, for example. A two-story garage was added in 1911 replacing a single story stable.

The Heath house has seven bedrooms on the second floor as well as two bathrooms and a study. The master bedroom, above the porch, has windows on three sides. On the ground floor the dining room and living room open into each other, with the living room continuing out to the front porch. The porch, living room and master bedroom face the traffic circle providing a view over the lawn. There is a service entrance through the kitchen and a servants' quarters including an additional two bedrooms. In recent years the servants' quarters has been used as a doctor's office. The house also features a half-level basement, actually at street level and so lower than the ground floor, used a playroom by the Heath children.

The house is built in dark red brick, possibly the same batch that was used for the Larkin Administration Building. The ground floor is reminiscent of the Isidore H. Heller House, and the house is also considered similar to the Meyer May House. The Heath House is distinctive due to the house being designed to compensate for the narrow lot. It is considered a precursor to Wright's renowned Frederick C. Robie House built in Chicago in 1909, constructed on a similarly sized block of land.

== See also ==
- List of Frank Lloyd Wright works

Other buildings by Frank Lloyd Wright in the Buffalo area:

- Darwin D. Martin House Complex (including the George Barton House)
- Graycliff
- Walter V. Davidson House
- Blue Sky Mausoleum
- Fontana Boathouse(in Slovak)
- Filling Station
