= Buffalo China =

Chinaware Manufacturer

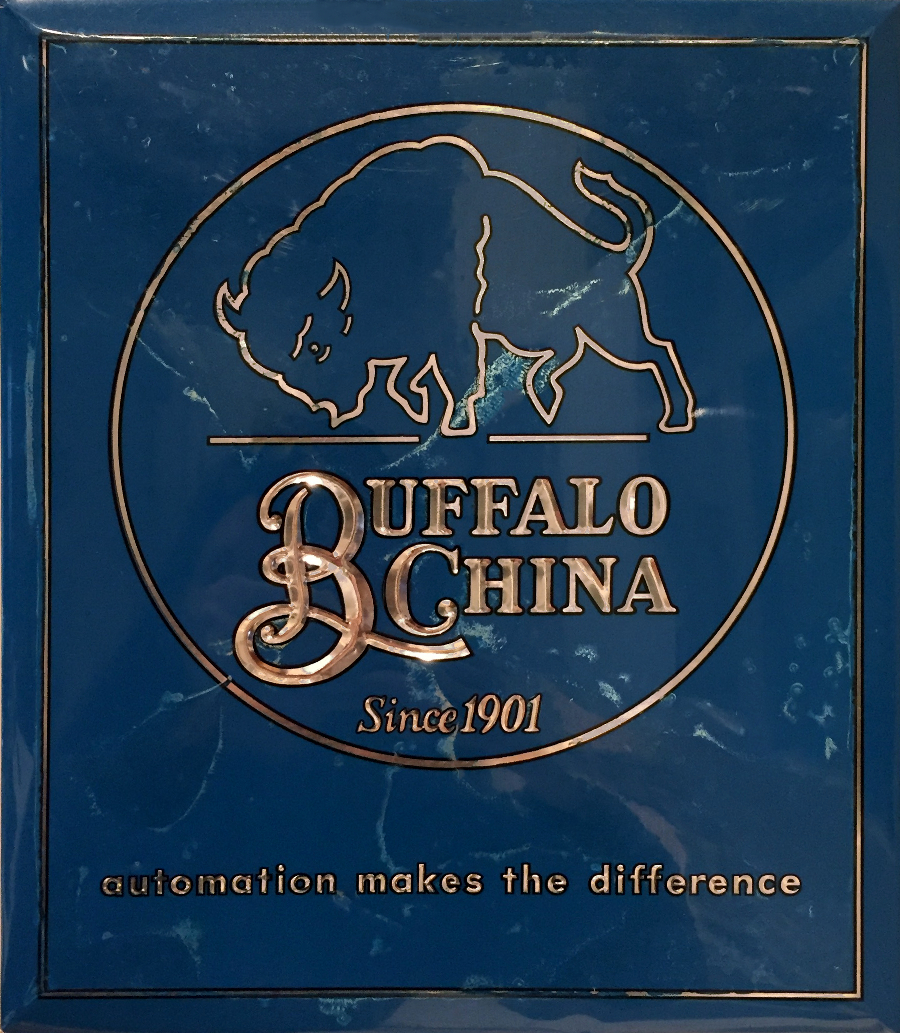
- Formerly: Buffalo Pottery
- Industry: Manufacturing
- Founded: 1901 in Buffalo, New York
- Founder: John D. Larkin
- Defunct: 2004
- Headquarters: Buffalo, New York, United States
- Area served: Worldwide
- Products: Ceramic tableware
- Brands: Deldare Ware, Blue Willow, Abino Ware, Lune Ware, Lamelle Ware

Buffalo China, Inc., formerly known as Buffalo Pottery, was a company founded in 1901 in Buffalo, New York as a manufacturer of semi-vitreous, and later vitreous, ceramic tableware. Prior to its acquisition by Oneida Ltd. in 1983, the company was one of the largest manufacturers of tableware in the United States.

== Early history ==
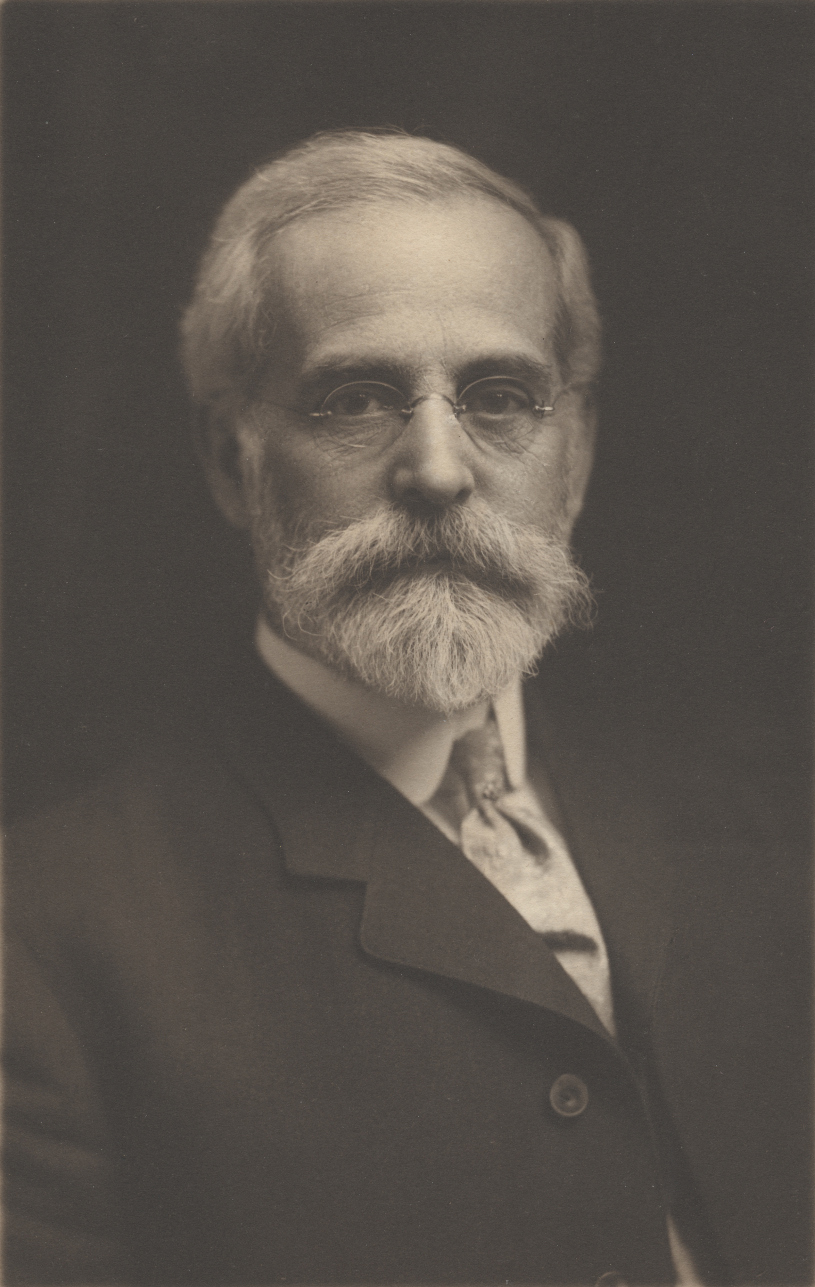
John D. Larkin

Buffalo Pottery was founded in 1901 by John D. Larkin (1845-1926) to supply the Larkin Company with premiums for its customers. The company's first general manager, Lewis H. Bown, recruited a number of skilled craftsmen and artisans from throughout the United States, including William J. Rea, Anna Kappler, and Ralph Stuart.

Buffalo Pottery was located on 8.5 acres at Seneca Street and Hayes Place in Buffalo, New York. At the time of its completion in 1903, the 80,000 square foot plant was the largest fireproof pottery in the world; and it was also the only pottery in the world completely operated by electricity.

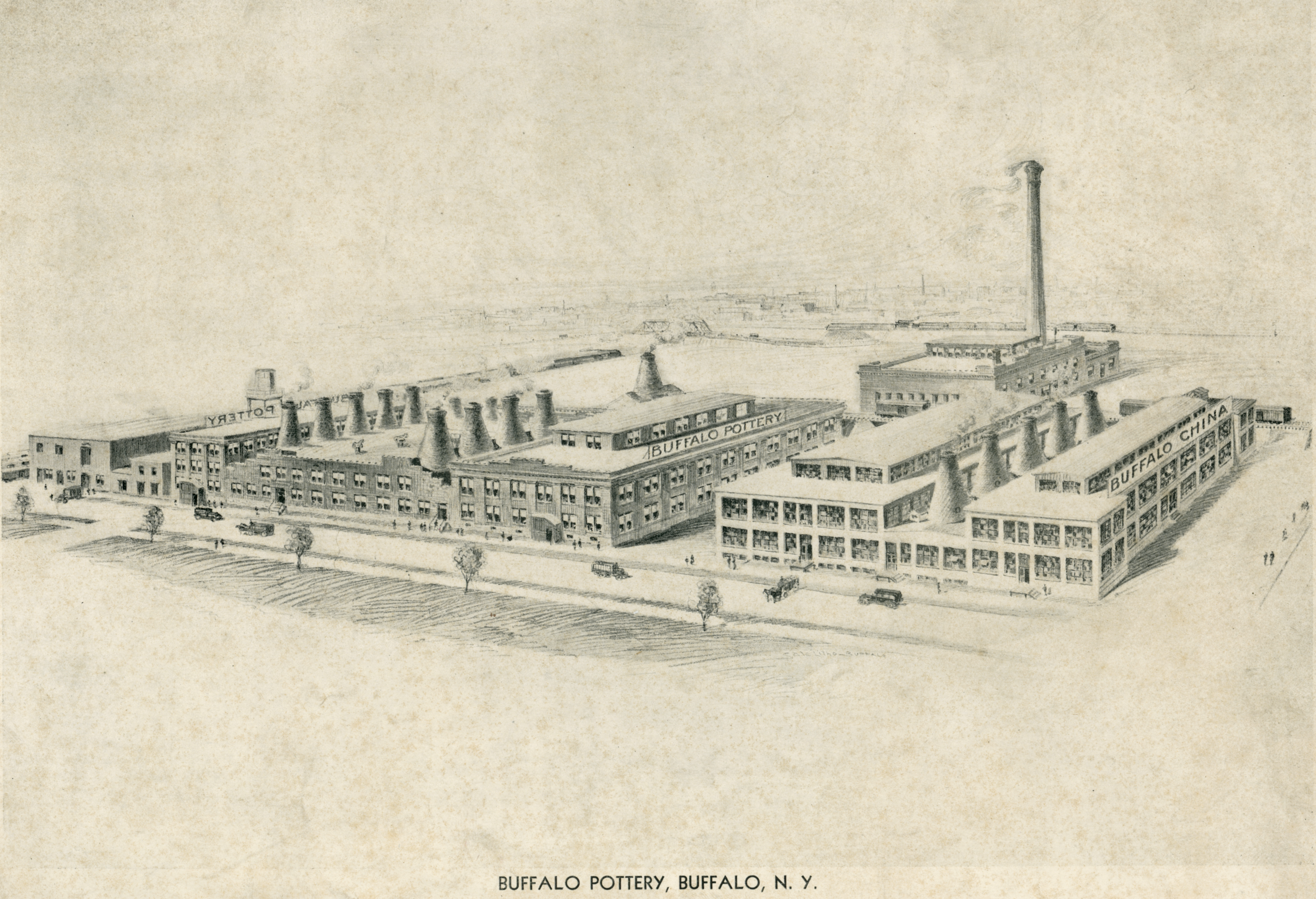
Buffalo Pottery, c.1910

In addition to the tableware produced for distribution as premiums to Larkin customers, Buffalo Pottery produced many lines of semi-vitreous china, including Deldare Ware, Roosevelt Bears, and Abino Ware, as well as the first Blue Willow dinnerware manufactured in the United States. These wares were distributed via wholesale and retail channels. By 1911, the company had 250 employees and was selling its products in 27 countries.

In 1915, the company began manufacturing vitrified ceramic and a few years later the plant was enlarged to 300,000 square feet. During World War I, it primarily manufactured for the US armed forces.

Under the leadership of John D. Larkin Jr. (1877–1945) in the late 1920s, Buffalo Pottery changed its focus to manufacturing custom institutional, restaurant, railroad, steamship, and hotel ware. The company would produce ware for such entities as the Chesapeake & Ohio Railway (George Washington and Chessie Cat services), the Greenbrier, the Ahwahnee Hotel at Yosemite, the Roycroft Inn, the 1939 New York World's Fair, and the US Navy. In 1931, Buffalo Pottery began production using its patented Lamelle process which reinforced the china to reduce breakage. From 1934 to 1937, Buffalo Pottery's art director was the noted modernist artist Ilonka Karasz.

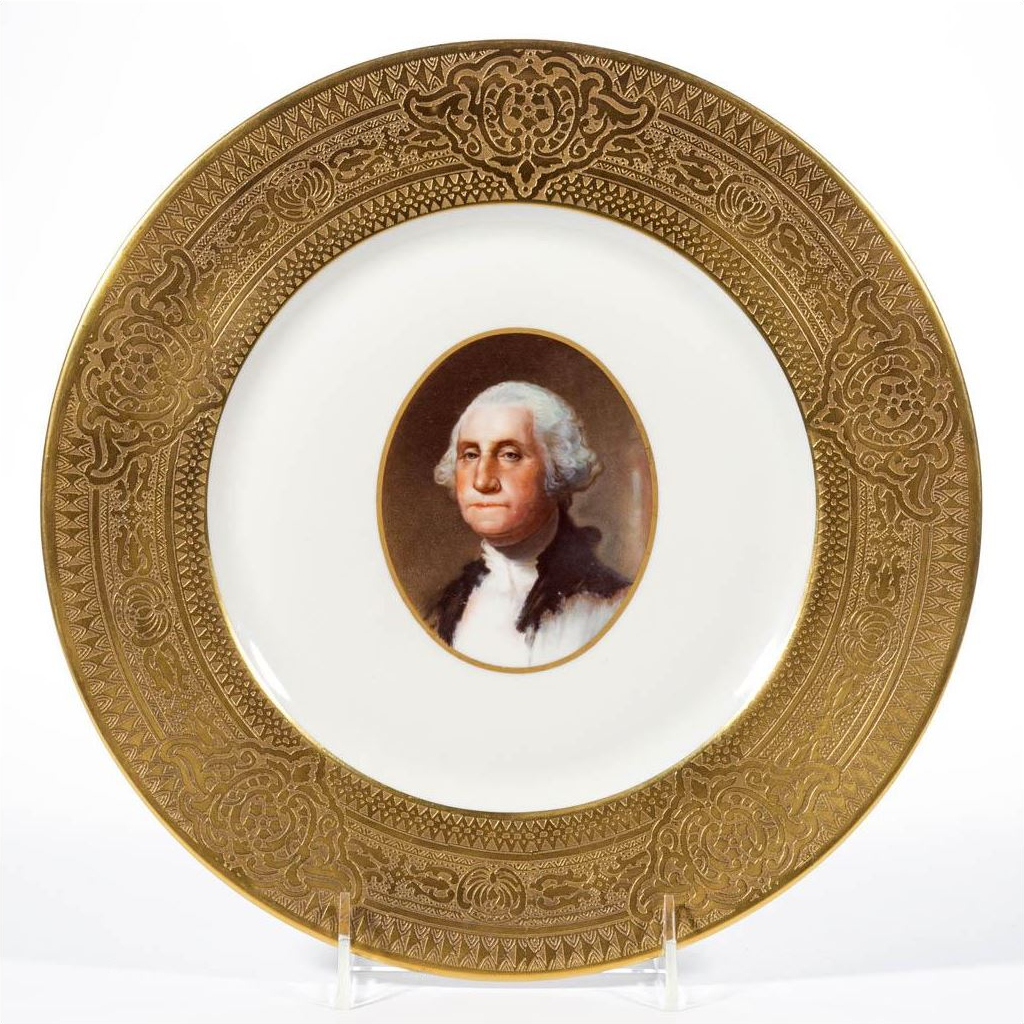
Buffalo Pottery George Washington Plate Made for the Chesapeake & Ohio Railway

== Intermediate years ==
During World War II, the company again manufactured primarily for the US military. However, the company was declared a non-essential factory and was not permitted to replace employees who left to serve in the military. Having lost some of its best skilled labor and with competitors not subject to similar regulation, the company turned to automation, with new equipment funded by the sale of several buildings. In 1946, Robert E. Gould (1900–1979), known in the US ceramics industry as the "master potter," was named president. By this time, economic efficiency had forced the company to drop customization in favor of mass production of a limited catalog of designs.

In 1956, the company changed its name from Buffalo Pottery to Buffalo China, Inc.

Harold M. Esty Jr. (1914–1986), John D. Larkin's grandson, served as the company's president from 1964 until 1970, overseeing the production of a wider range of designs and the installation of new equipement for direct screening, offset printing, and glaze equipment. By 1965, the company was producing a quarter of a million pieces per week in more than 50 patterns. Esty remained on the board of directors until the company's sale in 1983.

== Later years ==
In 1970, John C. Heebner (1922–2013) became Buffalo China's fifth and last president. He oversaw a modernization project, completed in 1979, which increased the plant's capacity by 50 percent.

In 1983, Oneida Limited purchased Buffalo China with Heebner serving on Oneida's board until 1994. Oneida increased Buffalo China's manufacturing space and added a manufacturing plant in Mexico. In 2004, due to an economic downturn, Oneida sold the factory in Buffalo to Niagara Ceramics Corporation and closed the factory in Mexico, thus ending Buffalo China's 100-year history of ceramic manufacturing. As of 2019, Oneida still retains the Buffalo China trade name and logos, and sells a few lines of Buffalo brand dinnerware.

== Collectibles ==
Buffalo Pottery and pre-1983 Buffalo China ware is collectible. Rarer hand-decorated pieces of lines such as Deldare Ware and Abino Ware have sold for thousands of dollars each.

== Gallery ==
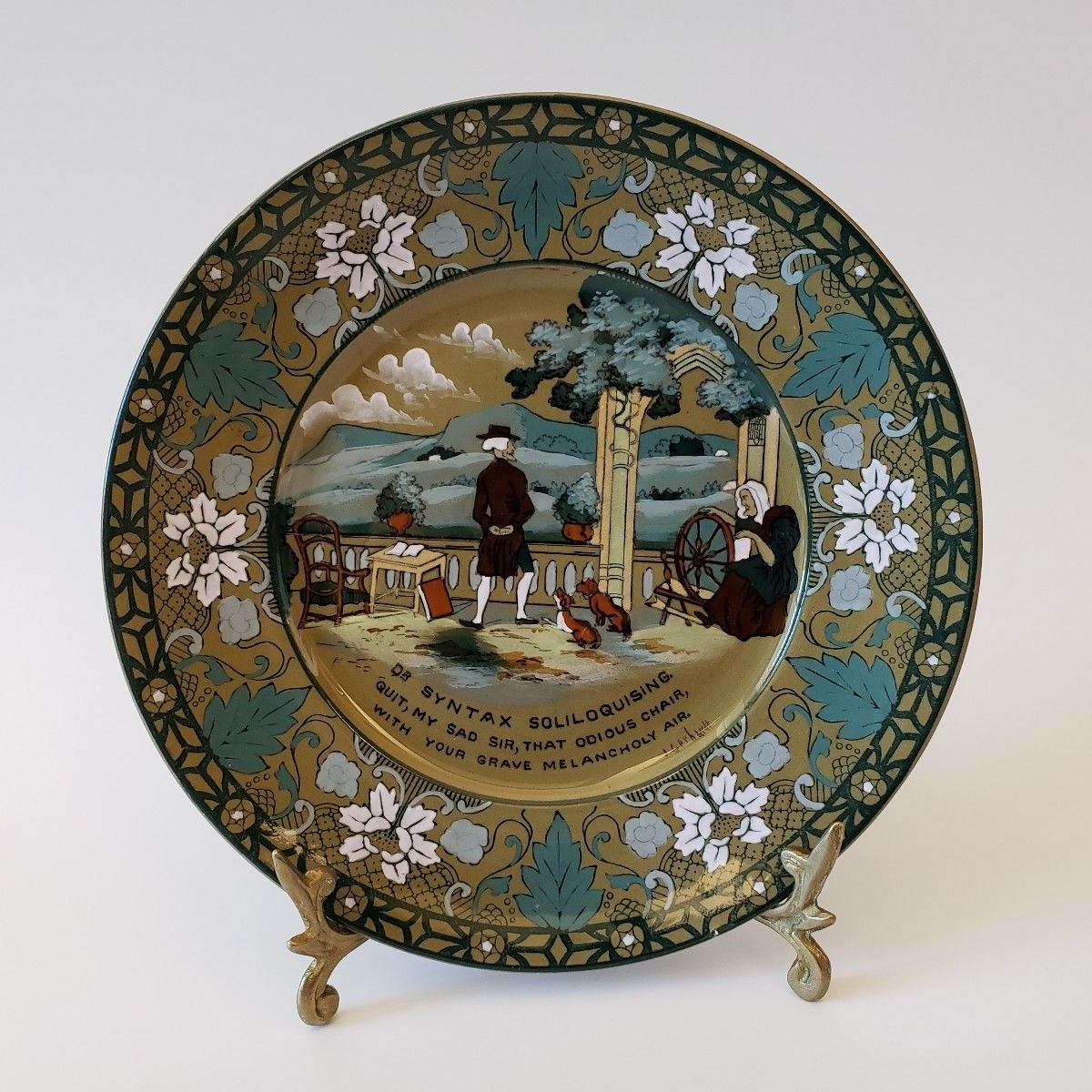
Buffalo Pottery Emerald Deldare Ware Plate

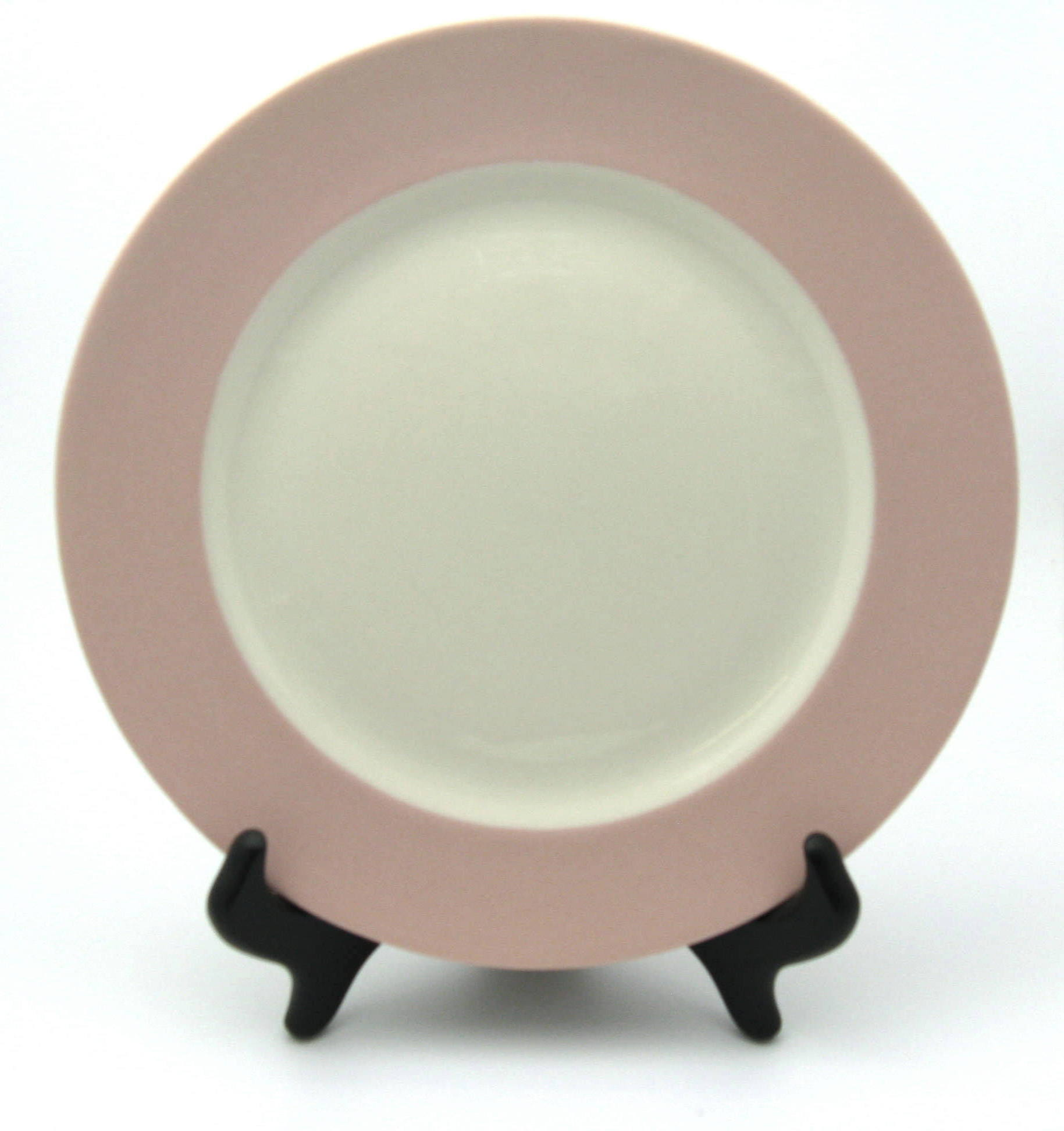
Buffalo China Rouge Lamelle Plate

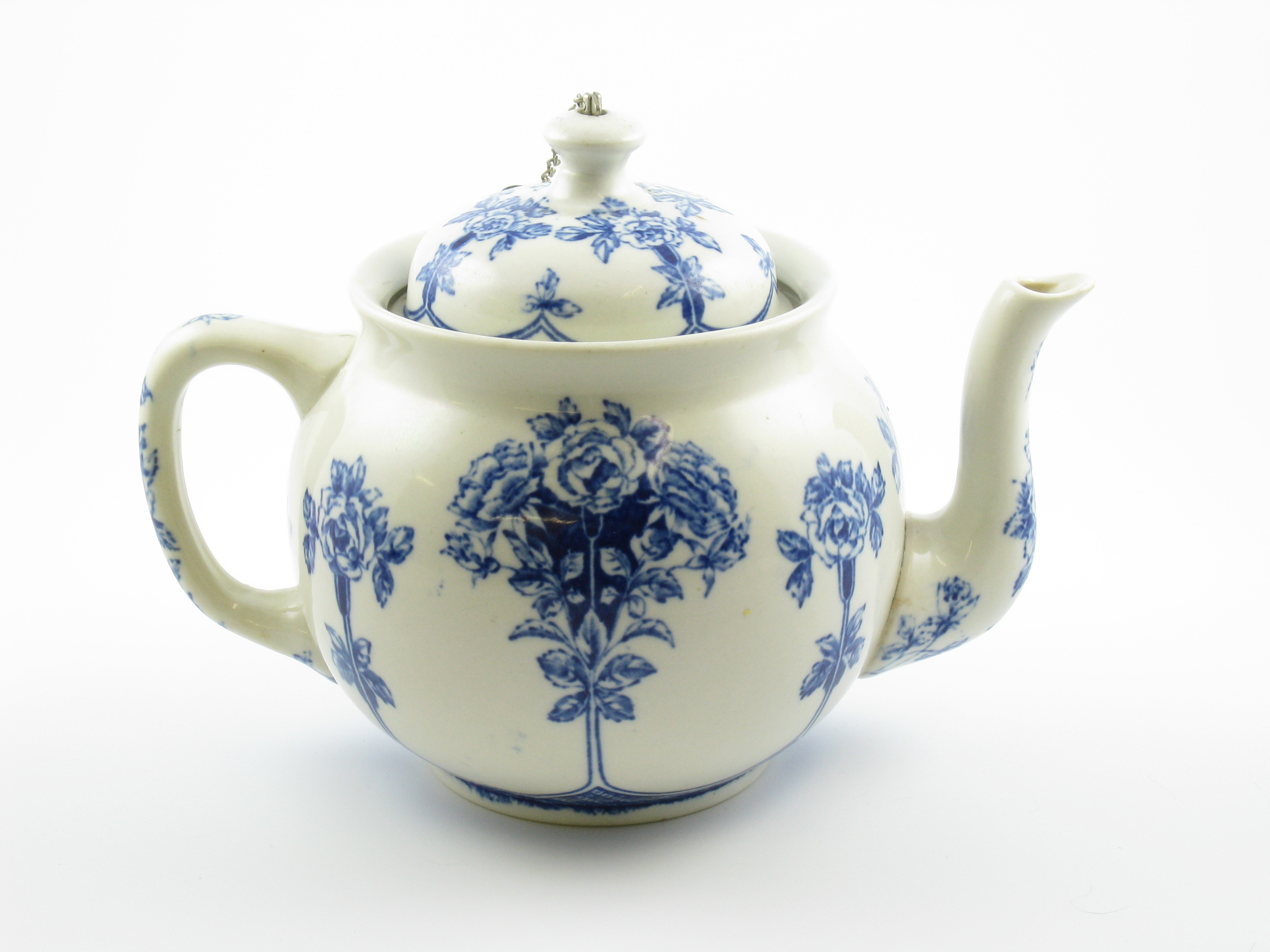
Buffalo Pottery Argyle Teapot

== See also ==
- Larkin Company
- John D. Larkin
- Restaurant Ware
- Oneida Limited
