= J. J. Walser Jr. House =

Historic house in Chicago, Illinois

- J.J. Walser Jr. House
- U.S. National Register of Historic Places
- Chicago Landmark
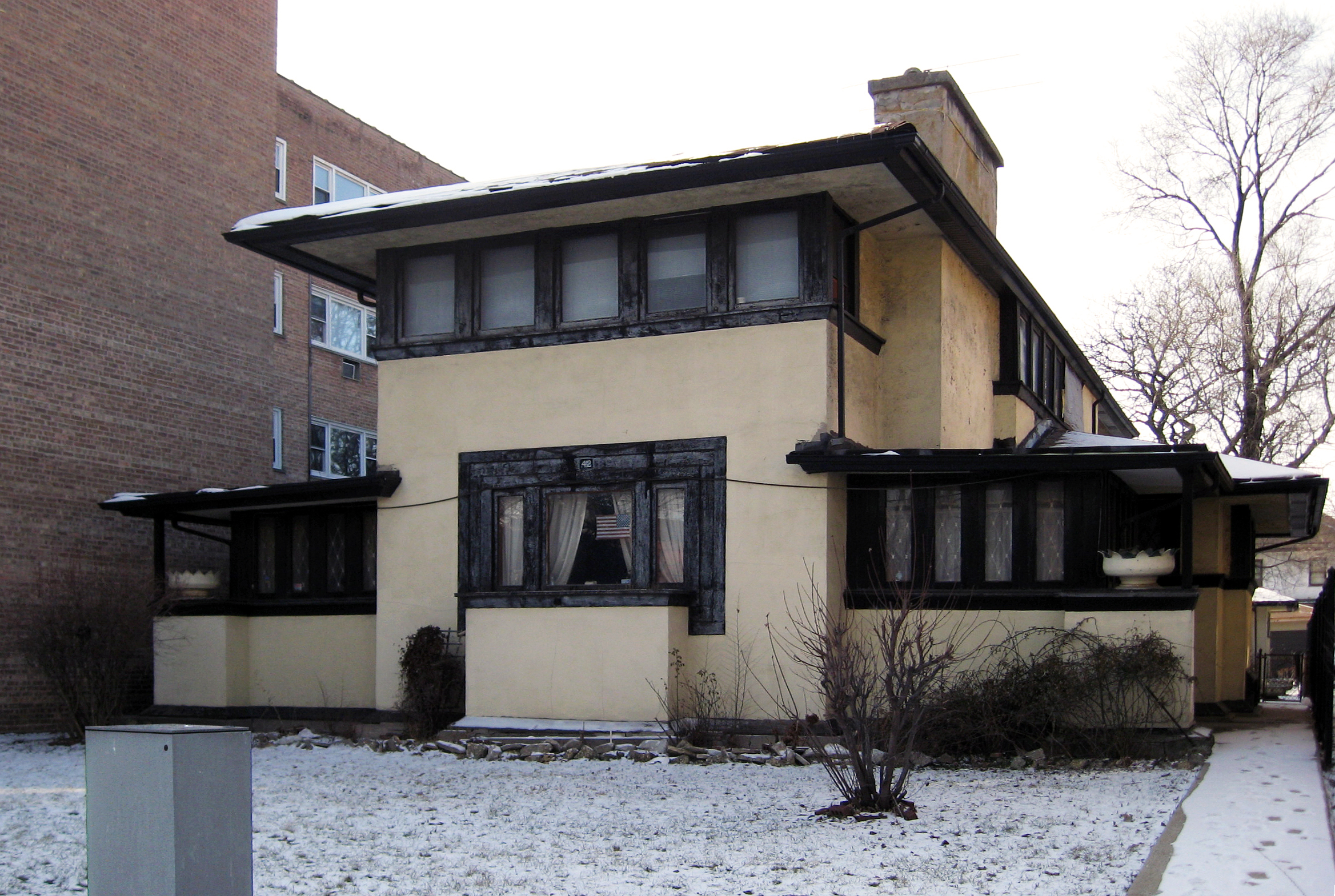

- Location within Chicago metropolitan area Location within Illinois Location within the United States
- Interactive map of J.J. Walser Jr. House
- Location: 42 N. Central Ave., Chicago, Illinois
- Coordinates: 41°52′53.5″N 87°45′55″W
- Built: 1903
- Architect: Frank Lloyd Wright
- Architectural style: Prairie School
- NRHP reference No.: 13000185

Significant dates
- Added to NRHP: April 23, 2013
- Designated CHICL: March 30, 1984

The J. J. Walser Jr. House is a Prairie style house in the Austin community area of Chicago, Illinois, United States. Designed by the architect Frank Lloyd Wright, the house was built for the real estate developer Joseph Jacob Walser Jr.

The Walser family bought the land in 1903, and the house was finished that year at a cost of $4,000 (equivalent to $143,333 in 2025). The Walsers moved out of the house in 1910. Since then, the house has had a dozen owners and undergone several modifications; for instance, the original outdoor porches were enclosed. Anne Teague and her husband Hurley acquired the building in 1970 and lived there until their deaths. After Anne died in 2019, the house began to deteriorate, was left abandoned, and went into foreclosure.

The Walser House was designed as a two-story single-family residence with a cruciform floor plan. Its exterior consists of stucco facade, casement windows, and a hip roof, with an entrance hidden on the south side. The first floor contains a reception room, an open plan living–dining area, and a kitchen; the second story has five bedrooms, and the basement contains service rooms. There is also a garage at the rear. After completion, the house appeared in a 1905 article in House Beautiful magazine and was included in Wright's Wasmuth Portfolio. The Walser House is a Chicago Landmark and is listed on the National Register of Historic Places.

== Site ==
The Walser House is at 42 North Central Avenue in the Austin community area of Chicago, Illinois. The house is on the western side of Central Avenue, bordered by apartment buildings to its north and south. The house is recessed 50 feet (15 m) from the street. The lot has an alleyway and a garage to the west, and a lawn and shrubs facing east toward Central Avenue. A concrete pathway to the south connects with the main entrance, while a second path to the north leads to the house's rear patio and garage.

The Walser House is one of the few vestiges of the neighborhood's former 19th-century suburban character, as most of Central Avenue consists of multi-family walkup structures and three- or four-story apartment buildings. Three blocks to the north is the Central station of the Chicago "L"'s Green Line.

== History ==
=== Development ===
Joseph J. Walser was a wealthy real-estate developer who graduated from the University of Michigan and worked for his father Jacob, also a developer. Joseph's childhood house was at 145 North Central Avenue, one block north of 42 North Central Avenue, where Jacob still lived with Joseph's mother and sister. Joseph and his wife Grace bought the site at 42 North Central Avenue from the family of Arthur W. Crafts on February 20, 1903. At the time of the sale, the site was undeveloped, despite being located near a Lake Street Elevated Railroad (now Green Line) station.

It is not known how the Walsers came in contact with Frank Lloyd Wright, whom they hired as architect. The National Park Service says that, since the Walser family were developers, they likely knew about local architectural trends and probably were aware of Wright's growing stature. The writer Thomas J. O'Gorman says that Wright had taken a liking to Walser, believing the client to be of "unspoiled instincts and untainted ideals". A permit for Walser's house was approved on May 22, 1903, but it is not certain who was tasked with building the structure. C. Iverson is listed on the permit, while the writer Thomas A. Heinz attributes the construction to Elmer E. Andrews.

=== Early owners ===
The house cost $4,000 (equivalent to $143,333 in 2025) and was completed by the end of 1903. The Walsers initially lived there with their daughter Gretchen, whose younger sisters Sally and Ruth were born after the house was completed. Only one image of the interior is known to have been taken while the Walser family lived there. They lived in the house for six or seven years.

In 1910, when the Walsers moved six blocks away, the house was sold to George Donnersberger. Afterward, the house went through a dozen owners. At some point in the mid-20th century, the house's porches were enclosed; a photograph from 1930 indicates that glass had been added to the porches by then. Subsequent owners removed all of the original lighting fixtures and some of the building's furniture. Sources disagree on whether the rear annex was added during the Walser family's occupancy or in the 1950s. According to the National Park Service, the art glass windows were sold in the 1960s. One of the windows, measuring 64 by 28 inches (163 by 71 cm) across, was valued at up to $12,000 in 1998 but was not sold at that time.

=== Teague occupancy ===
Anne Teague and her husband Hurley acquired the building in either 1969 or 1970. Anne Teague recalled that the couple did not know about the house's historical status when they bought the house, saying that, after having cared for white families' children in Atlanta, she had just wanted to have her own house. As Anne said, "This is my dream house from a child." At the time, the interior was decorated in a black-and-white palette. The Teagues lived there with their son Johnny and five nephews and nieces. Hurley Teague helped preserve the Walser House prior to his death in 1997. Among other changes, Hurley repainted the interiors and added some wood panels.

Anne obtained a reverse mortgage on the house in either 1997 or 2003. The mortgage was secured by the house's equity; the interest did not need to be repaid until Anne stopped occupying the house. By the early 21st century, the house's roof was leaking, and the house's facade was cracking. One of the windows on the second floor was covered with a tarp, and the front door was locked behind a gate and had not been used for some time. Anne said in 2009 that she did not have enough money to repair the house. By then, the Landmarks Preservation Council of Illinois had labeled the building among Illinois's most endangered structures. The Teagues' granddaughter Charisse Grossley said that the family had requested help from elected officials, to little avail. After exhausting other options, the director of the local organization Eyes on Austin asked the producers of the TV series Extreme Makeover for help fixing the house.

Landmarks Illinois offered to help Anne Teague refurbish the house after the organization received several complaints about the house's condition. At the suggestion of the Frank Lloyd Wright Building Conservancy, in 2017, the architecture firm Wiss, Janney, Elstner Associates, Inc. created a pro bono report on the house's condition. The firm showed their report to Anne the next year. The Wright Building Conservancy visited the house in 2019 to determine how to fix the roof. Anne died that year, and the house was subsequently left vacant, as the Teagues' son lived elsewhere.

=== Abandonment ===
After Anne's death, her family could not pay the interest on the house's reverse mortgage. Local organizations including Chicago Metropolitan Agency for Planning and Austin Coming Together that were attempting restoration of the Central Avenue corridor prompted interest in the restoration of the Walser House. The building decayed significantly faster than normal; by 2024, the house was vacant, deteriorating, and in danger of foreclosure. The Wright Building Conservancy's director noted that there was evidence of unauthorized occupation, including a space heater and doors that had been swung open. The financial firm BNY had initiated foreclosure proceedings on the house the previous year, while the Federal National Mortgage Association had reassigned the reverse mortgage to a Florida firm. Crain's Chicago Business reported that the roof and plaster walls had holes and that the window frames were decaying. Several organizations were keeping track of the house's condition, including the Wright Building Conservancy and local preservation group Preservation Chicago. The conservancy also tried to conduct basic maintenance, and it submitted evidence of building violations to the government of Chicago.

Preservation Chicago included the structure in its "Chicago 7", a listing of the city's most endangered historic buildings, in 2025. By then, the building was suffering from water damage and had been vandalized. The foreclosure proceeding and the reverse mortgage made it harder to save the Walser House. The building could not be repaired without permission from its owner, but it was not clear who owned the house after Anne Teague's death. Because the Walser House is on the National Register of Historic Places, it was eligible for historic-preservation tax credits. Landmarks Illinois wanted the Demolition Court to reassign ownership of the house or force BNY to repair the house. It would cost up to $500,000 just to stabilize the house, while the cost of restoration was estimated at up to $2 million. Ward Miller of Preservation Chicago estimated that it could take over a year just to clarify the house's financials. Darnell Shields of another local organization, Austin Coming Together, said that the house could be converted into a historic house museum with offices once it was renovated. That March, the holder of the house's mortgage agreed to make emergency repairs.

When the house was auctioned off in December 2025, the auction received a single bid for $240,000 from PHH Mortgage, which then took control of the property. A federal agency, Fannie Mae, had taken over the house by January 2026. A sale listing for the building appeared on Zillow that month, but the listing was taken down after the Frank Lloyd Wright Building Conservancy and Austin Coming Together identified it as fraudulent. That June, Austin Coming Together bought the house, planning to restore it.

== Architecture ==
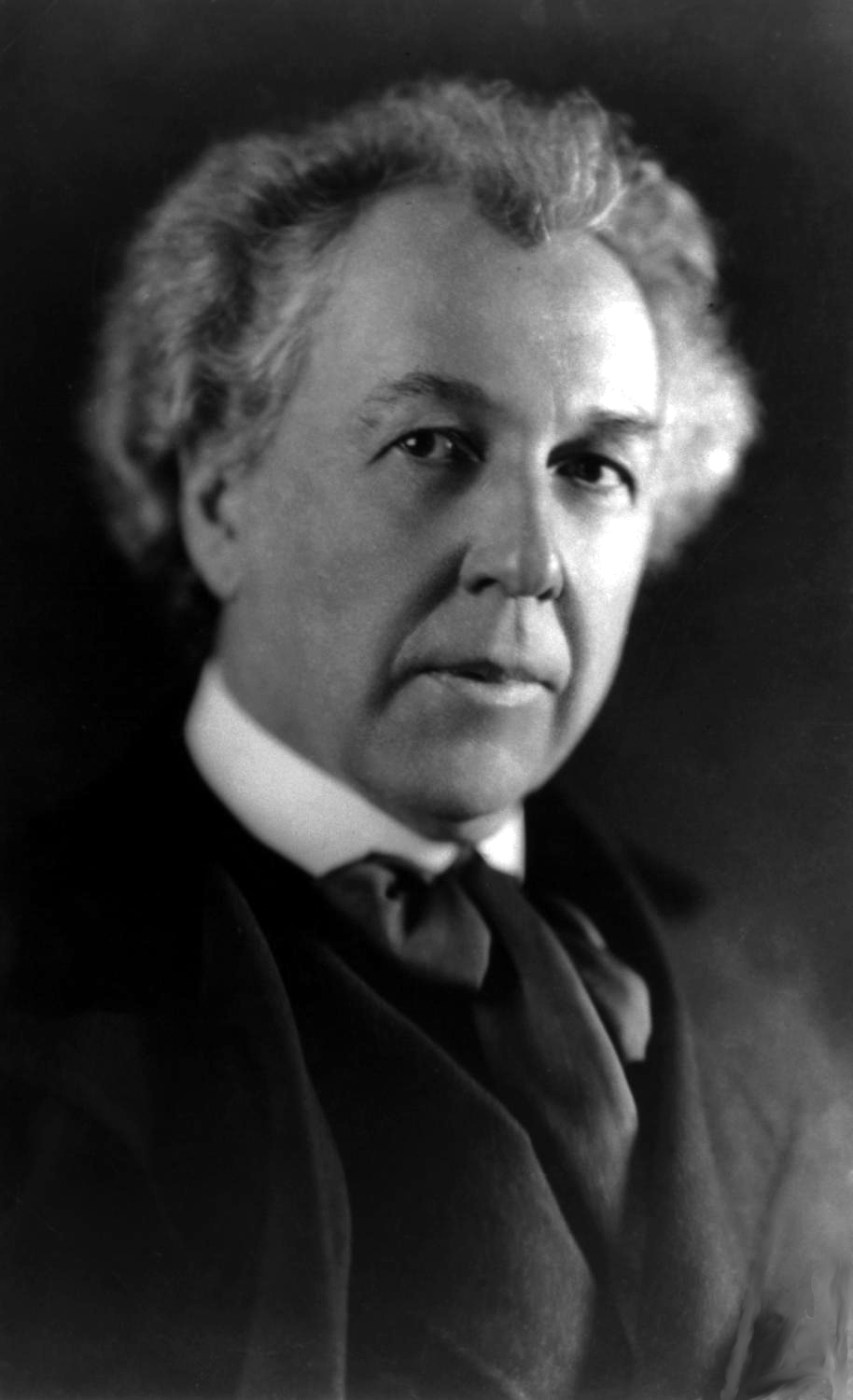
Frank Lloyd Wright

The house was designed by Frank Lloyd Wright and is one of five extant Prairie style buildings that he designed in Chicago. It is composed of a two-story main section, which is cubic in form and contains the living room and bedrooms. There are also two single-story, cube-shaped outer pavilions, one each to the north and south of the main section. The main section protrudes to the west and east of the outer pavilions, giving the building a cruciform floor plan. The general plan is shared with the George Barton House, which was built in Buffalo, New York, around the same time.

The facade is mostly made of stucco, with wood trim scattered throughout. Similar to other Prairie style houses, it has a protruding, low hipped roof, in addition to art glass and horizontal groups of windows on the facade. The decorative elements are concentrated on the facade's first story, giving the impression that the roof is floating above the second story. Next to the house is a 25-by-25-foot (7.6 by 7.6 m), wood-frame garage with a stucco facade, a hipped roof, and an open plan interior; this garage dates from 1903.

=== Exterior ===
The primary elevation of the Walser House's facade is to the east, along Central Avenue. At the first floor, the central section of the house has a picture window with casement windows on either side; these are all surrounded by wood trim. The outer pavilions are recessed from the main facade and contain protruding porches, which were enclosed during a 20th-century renovation. Each of the porches has four wood-framed casement windows and a shallow hip roof above it. A belt course, made of pine, runs horizontally above the first story. There are five square, wood-framed casement windows on the second story of the central section's eastern elevation, below the eave of the roof. The art glass windows originally had chevron patterns, but the original art glass windows on the second floor have been removed over the years.

The southern elevation is also decorated in stucco and pine, like the eastern elevation. The basement-level water table is clad with wood trim, which wraps around hopper windows in the basement. On the first story are wood-framed casement windows, which illuminate the southeastern corner's porch. The main entrance is on the eastern side of the southern elevation, (Note: O'Gorman 2004, p. 156, cites the entrance as being on the house's northern elevation.) next to the porch, and cannot be seen from the street. The entrance consists of an arched niche with a round-arched door. East of the entrance is a lamp at the house's southeastern corner, while inside the entrance, a small wooden stair ascends to the original southeastern porch. To the west of the door are three casement windows on the first floor, which illuminate the dining room and are stacked atop three hopper windows. On the second floor of the central section's southern elevation, there are six windows.

The northern elevation has a similar massing and appearance to the southern elevation, with wood trim and hopper windows in the basement, as well as casement windows on the first and second stories. The windows on the first story illuminate the porch, while those on the second story overlook the stair hall and the west and east bedrooms. The primary difference from the south elevation is that there is a stucco chimney at the center of the north elevation's second story, a common feature in Prairie-style buildings. To the west of the chimney is a passageway leading to a one-story kitchen wing, which has a stucco facade, basement-level hopper windows, ground-level casement windows, and shallow hip roof. There is also a concrete stoop that rises to a glass-enclosed porch outside the kitchen. A door on the kitchen wing's western elevation descends to the basement.

A one-room-wide annex was constructed to the west after the house's original construction. Like the original house, this annex has wood trim and a shallow hip roof. Vinyl siding is used on the annex's facade above the basement, and there are windows on the north, west, and south of the annex. In addition, there is a concrete stoop ascending to a wooden door at the center of the western elevation. Two wooden belt courses run above the first story, above which are ribbon windows, similar to those on the north and south. There is a hip roof above the annex, which is cut away at its northwestern corner.

=== Interior ===
The interior covers 3,200 square feet (300 m^{2}). Three-fourths of the space is on the first and second floors, while the rest is in the basement. The house has one bathroom and five bedrooms. It was originally built with four bedrooms, and an additional bedroom exists in the rear annex. There are cast iron radiators throughout the first and second floors. Wood caning, manufactured by the Chicago Metallic Corporation, is also used in the house.

==== First floor ====
The first floor retains most of its original layout, except for the annex at the western end. The main entrance, on the south elevation, leads to a reception room with a high wood-trimmed ceiling, a bench to the west, and coat closets to the east. Four steps along the north wall ascend to the main living–dining space.

The living–dining space is a 50-foot-long (15 m) room, divided into three sections from north to south. It is designed in an open plan, an unusual feature at the time of the house's construction, since contemporary houses had clearly-defined rooms separated by walls. The living room is on the eastern side of the living–dining space and has a plaster ceiling, in addition to a brick-and-wood fireplace mantel on its northern wall. Doors lead from the living room to the enclosed northeastern and southeastern porches. There are four wood-trimmed piers at the center of the living–dining space, which surround a central circulation area and are topped by a series of wooden shelves. A railing screen and a staircase to the second floor is at the north end of the circulation area. The dining room is on the western side of the living–dining space and has windows on its western and southern walls. On the dining room's north wall is a sideboard, as well as a doorway to the kitchen.

To the west of the dining room is a family room with wood panels, a dropped ceiling, and laminated floors. A tiled corridor links the dining room and kitchen. The corridor has a telephone alcove and an enclosed stair descending to the basement. At the end of the corridor is a kitchen with dropped ceilings, glass-tiled walls, laminated sheet floors, and a wooden cupboard. A passageway with glass cabinets leads to the northeastern porch. The northeastern porch itself has been repurposed as a breakfast room and has a plaster ceiling, stucco-and-plaster walls, vinyl floors, and casement windows. The southeastern porch is used as a sunroom and is made of similar materials to the northeastern porch.

==== Other floors ====
On the second floor, a central hallway with windows extends south from the stair hall, and the bedrooms extend off this hallway. The stair hall itself, at the northern end of the second floor, has a wooden post and a storage closet, and the house's sole bathroom extends off the stair hall's eastern wall. A ceiling hatch leads to a plainly-decorated attic under the roof. The eastern section of the second floor contains the master bedroom, which has casement windows, a closet, a built-in wardrobe, and a Roman-brick fireplace mantel. The second and third bedrooms, on the south side of the second floor, have glazed windows and built-in wardrobes. The fourth bedroom, to the west, has another built-in wardrobe and a closet. A set of casement windows separates the original house's western wall from the annex to the west. There is a fifth bedroom on the annex's second floor.

The basement is accessed by the stair from the kitchen–dining room corridor. It has wood-frame walls with plaster and wood finishes, except at the perimeter, where the walls are made of concrete. The floors are also made of concrete, while the ceilings are finished in plaster. The basement has a heater room at the center, surrounded by other rooms on all four sides. Clockwise from north, these spaces include the laundry room; the coal room; a storage closet; and the workroom and another storage closet. A bathroom adjoins the basement stair.

== Impact ==
=== Reception ===
After completion, the house appeared in "Plaster Houses and their Construction", published in House Beautiful magazine in September 1905. (Note: For the article, see: Spencer, Robert C. Jr. (September 1905). "Plaster Houses and their Construction". House Beautiful. Vol. 18, no. 4. p. 25 – via Internet Archive.) The house was also part of Wright's Wasmuth Portfolio. In 1977, the Chicago News Journal described the Walser House as one of two "noteworthy homes meriting recognition" on Central Avenue in Austin. The writer Dominic A. Pacyga said in 1986 that the house was "a good example" of Wright's "mature" Prairie style, after he had finalized most of the characteristics of that style. Thomas J. O'Gorman wrote in his 2004 book Frank Lloyd Wright's Chicago that "the sturdiness of Wright's designs is especially evident at the Walser House", stating that it "remains a genteel beauty" despite deterioration over time.

John Waters of the Frank Lloyd Wright Building Conservancy said of the Walser House in 2024, "I think this is a house that really captures people's imaginations, in part because of where it is." The Chicago Sun-Times wrote the same year that, despite the house's deteriorating state, "the home's beauty—and design elements that would become hallmarks of Wright's early work—becomes apparent" upon further observation. The Chicago Tribune wrote in 2025 that the house "has been lauded for its simplicity, free-flowing efficiency and organic naturalism", while Wallpaper magazine called it a "gem that's 'hidden in plain sight'".

=== Landmark designations and influence ===
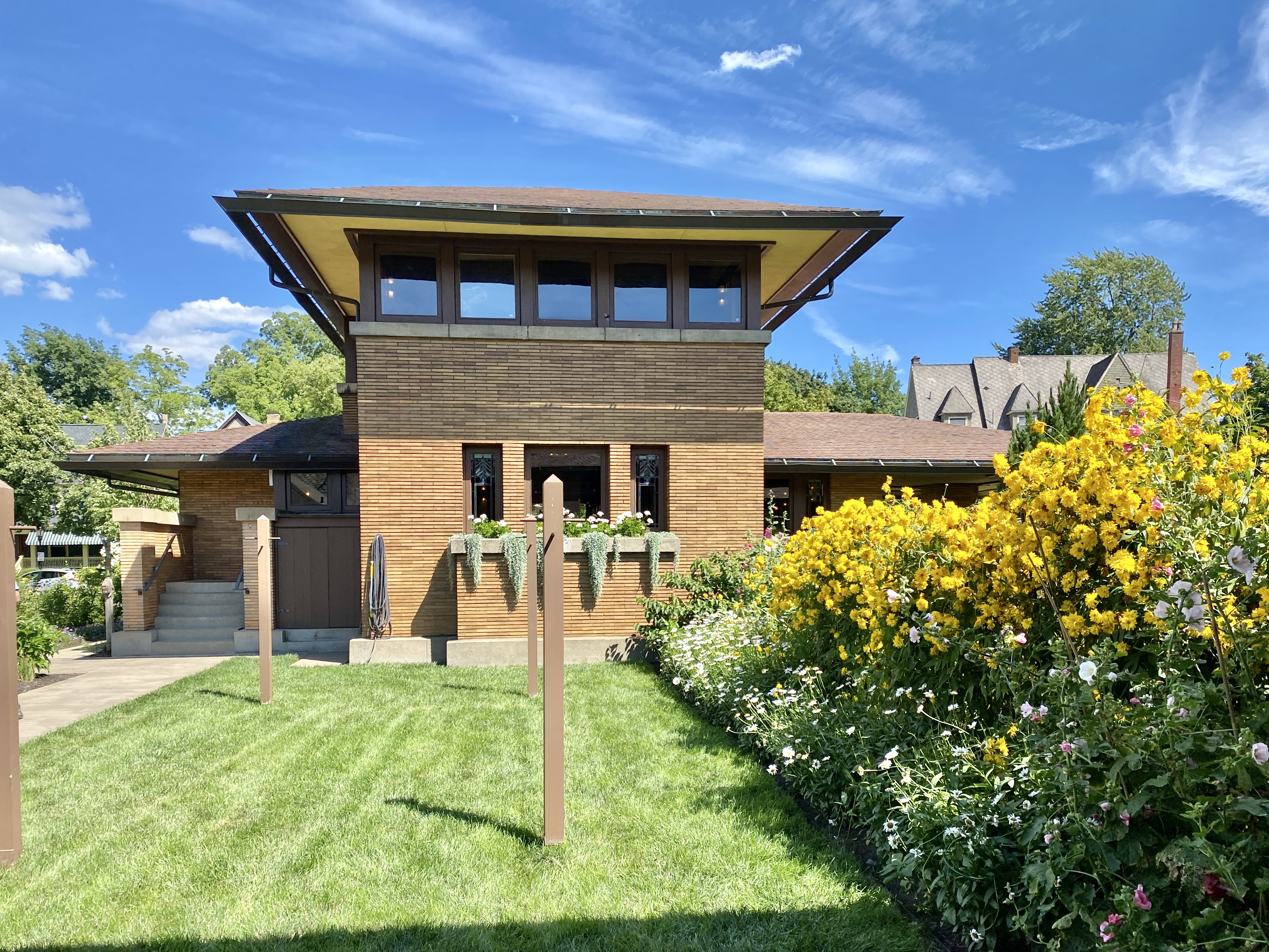
The design of the house was the basis for that of Wright's George Barton House in Buffalo, New York.

The Commission on Chicago Landmarks suggested in 1983 that the building be designated as a city landmark, citing it as an early example of Wright's Prairie-style houses, and the Walser House became a Chicago Landmark on March 30, 1984. The National Park Service added the building to the National Register of Historic Places on April 23, 2013; the landmark designation report stated that the house "embod[ies] the distinctive characteristics of a type, period, or method of construction". The landmark statuses helped protect the house from demolition.

The design of the house was the basis for that of Wright's George Barton House in Buffalo, New York. Darwin D. Martin, the businessman who had commissioned Wright to design the Barton House, decided to copy the Walser House's design verbatim because it was "a simple, inexpensive house" for which blueprints could be easily drawn. Some of the Barton House's architectural features, such as its large veranda and tiled roof, were modifications of similar features in the Walser House. These design features became more popular after they were used in the Barton House and the Robie House. The house's design elements also inspired those of the K. C. DeRhodes House in South Bend, Indiana, and the now-demolished Horner House on Sherwin Avenue in Chicago.

== See also ==
- List of Frank Lloyd Wright works
- National Register of Historic Places listings in West Side Chicago
