= George Barton House =

Historic house in Buffalo, New York

George and Delta Barton House
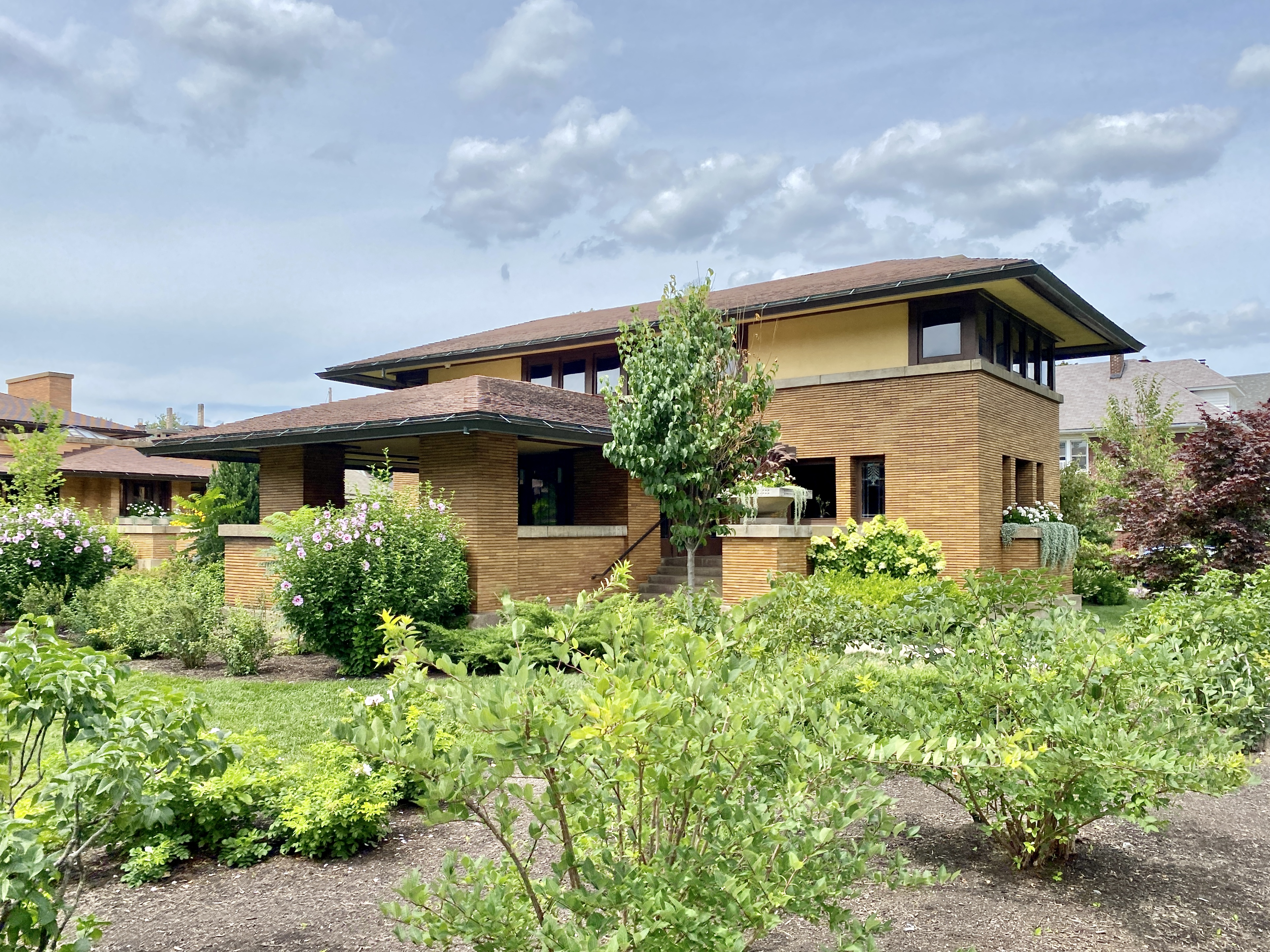
- View from the south

General information
- Architectural style: Prairie Style
- Location: 118 Summit Avenue, Buffalo, New York, US
- Coordinates: 42°56′12″N 78°50′52″W
- Construction started: 1903
- Completed: 1904
- Cost: $12,000 (Note: Equivalent to $336,000 in 2025)
- Owner: Martin House Restoration Corporation

Technical details
- Material: Brick facade
- Size: 4,400 square feet (410 m^{2})
- Floor count: 2

Design and construction
- Architect: Frank Lloyd Wright

Other information
- Number of rooms: 8

Website
- martinhouse.org/explore/theestate/
- George Barton House
- U.S. Historic district – Contributing property
- New York State Register of Historic Places
- Part of: D. D. Martin House Complex (ID75001185); Parkside East Historic District (ID86002817)
- NYSRHP No.: 02940.005583

Significant dates
- Added to NRHP: 1975-12-30
- Designated NYSRHP: 1980-06-23

The George Barton House is a Prairie style house at 118 Summit Avenue in Buffalo, New York, United States. The house was designed by Frank Lloyd Wright and developed between 1903 and 1904 for George and Delta Barton, the brother-in-law and sister of the businessman Darwin D. Martin. Located just north of Martin's own house, it was the first of six buildings in the Darwin D. Martin House estate. The Barton House has a two-story, cruciform layout formed by intersecting one- and two-story wings. The exterior has a Roman brick facade and overhanging roofs, and the interior spans 4,400 square feet (410 m^{2}) across eight rooms. The Barton House is listed on the National Register of Historic Places as part of the Martin estate.

Martin commissioned the house as a test, the success of which led Martin to hire Wright to design his own house and the Larkin Administration Building. The project, Wright's first on the East Coast of the United States, significantly overran its initial $4,000 budget, ultimately costing $12,000. Unlike the rest of the Martin estate, the Barton House was never abandoned or heavily modified. The property was acquired by the University at Buffalo in the 1960s and later sold to private owners before being purchased by the Martin House Restoration Corporation in 1994. It was renovated in 2018 and is open to the public for tours and events.

== Description ==
The George Barton House (also known as the Delta and George F. Barton House) is one of six buildings in the Darwin D. Martin Estate, designed by architect Frank Lloyd Wright, in Buffalo, New York, United States. The Barton House is at the northeast corner of the complex, at 118 Summit Avenue. The estate is part of the Parkside East Historic District. The historian Eric Jackson-Forsberg wrote that the Barton House, intended as a middle-class residence, represented the second-highest of four social tiers of housing within the complex. Jackson-Forsberg regarded the Barton House as socially inferior to the Martin House, intended for the upper-class Darwin family, and superior to the standalone servant housing and the main house's en-suite servant apartments.

The house sits on the eastern end of an axis along which the estate's conservatory, stable, and gardener's cottage (from east to west) are also arranged. The estate's main house and pergola are located on a separate north–south axis running through the conservatory. When the house was built, it was separated from the building to the north by 5 feet (1.5 m) at its narrowest point, and the house's original lawn was on the south. When an apartment building was built on the southern lawn, the lot to the north was acquired for use as a lawn. The apartments adjoining the Barton and Martin houses were subsequently demolished in the 2000s.

=== Exterior ===
The house has a cruciform layout and is two stories high. The layout is formed by intersecting one- and two-story wings. Its layout is similar to two of Wright's earlier designs: the J. J. Walser Jr. House, located in Chicago, and the Home in the Prairie Town plan, which Wright had drawn up for Ladies' Home Journal magazine in 1901. The Barton and Walser layouts were reused for Wright's later K. C. DeRhodes House in South Bend, Indiana, and the now-demolished Horner House on Sherwin Avenue in Chicago. Including the wings, the building has a frontage of 50 feet (15 m), the same width as two standard land lots in the neighborhood.

The exterior is clad in brick, which extends to the windowsill level on the second story. The house uses the same Roman brick as the rest of the estate, with deep joints. There is a porch to the south, and the entrance is on that elevation as well. Visitors accessing the entrance turn right (east) toward a stoop, then left (north) toward the door. The second floor has casement windows, which wrap around the corners, allowing sunlight to illuminate the bedrooms on that floor. Above these are deep eaves.

The house has hip roofs on multiple levels, which overhang each other. The roofs are made of flat red tiles, which were also used in the original conservatory and the main house. A standalone brick wall links with the conservatory to the west. Wright did not build a wall along Summit Avenue to the east, since he felt it would interrupt the esthetic consistency of the estate.

=== Interior ===
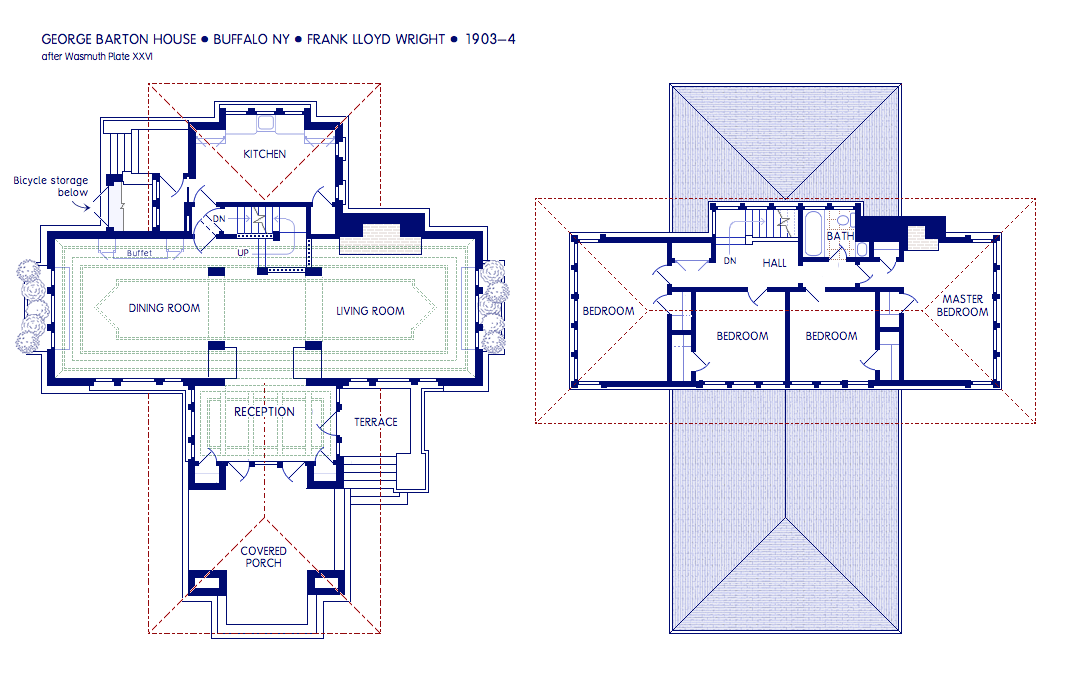
First and second story floor plans

The interior spans 4,400 square feet (410 m^{2}), (Note: One source gives a contradictory area of 2,200 square feet (200 m^{2}) for the Barton House.) with eight rooms inside. Because the Barton House is simpler than the Martin House in plan, it was also easier to maintain. A 1975 report found that many of the interior fixtures, such as glasswork, trim, lamps, and radiators, were still intact, an account corroborated by The Globe and Mail in 1988. The primary rooms of the house—the dining and living rooms on the first (ground) floor, and the bedrooms on the second floor—are within the taller two-story central section. This was in common with the Walser House, which had its secondary rooms (the entrance foyer and kitchen) in the one-story wings. The kitchen extends toward the northern side of the lot.

The principal living spaces are concentrated in the central two-story portion of the house where the reception, living, and dining areas open into each other. Where the wings intersect, rectangular piers at each corner divide the first floor into a large central space and two smaller flanking spaces. Interior furniture and design details such as a stair, panels, and fireplace are arranged around the piers. Also on the first floor is a kitchen at the north end; a veranda extends from the reception hall to the south. The two main bedrooms are on the second story, flanking a narrow hall.

== History ==
The Martin estate was commissioned by businessman Darwin D. Martin, who worked his way up into the senior management of the Larkin Company, a major soap manufacturer. Martin's sister Delta Barton and her husband George moved to Buffalo in 1895 after George began working at the Larkin Company. Delta and Darwin had been separated for several years after their mother had died, and as a result, they had formed a close relationship when they finally met each other again. The Bartons initially lived a few blocks away from Martin, who lived on Summit Avenue in the Parkside East district.

=== Development ===
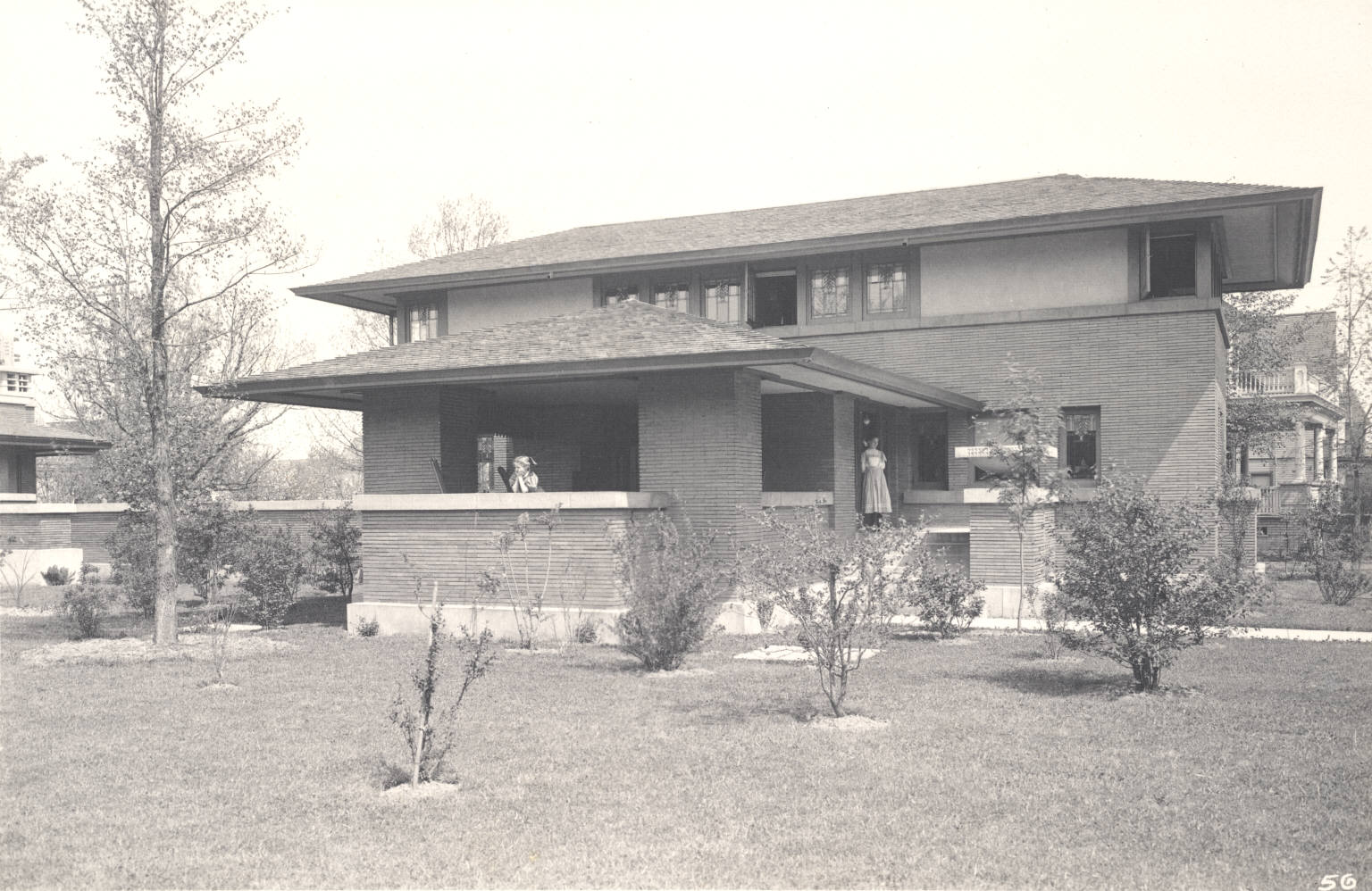
Barton House c. 1905

By the beginning of the 20th century, Martin's wife Isabelle was encouraging him to build a house befitting his wealth. Following a recommendation of from brother William, Martin wrote to architect Frank Lloyd Wright, asking him to design a house, and they first met to discuss the estate in November 1902. The next month, Martin paid $14,000 (Note: Equivalent to $421,000 in 2025) for 1 1/3 acres (0.54 ha) at the intersection of Summit Avenue and Jewett Parkway, just south of a house he already owned in Parkside East. Wright drew a primitive sketch of the Martin estate in May 1903, which included the Martin and Barton house. The estate was envisioned as a family compound, with houses for Martin and his sister Delta, as well as space where their siblings could potentially build extra houses if they wanted. Wright historian Jack Quinan writes that the Bartons likely would not have been able to afford the house on their own, nor would they have been predisposed to hire Wright. In any case, the Bartons' involvement in the design process was minimal, Martin being the main client.

Martin wanted Wright to complete the Barton House first, commissioning that house in March 1903, before the entire estate had been planned out. Martin had asked Wright to design a house with a $4,000 budget. (Note: Equivalent to $115,000 in 2025) The outcome of the Barton House's construction determined whether Wright would receive the Martin House commission; writers retrospectively characterized the decision as a test of Martin and Wright's relationship. The Barton House plan was based on the J. J. Walser Jr. House, with several revisions that influenced the Martin estate's architecture. For example, Wright added a porch facing the Martins' future house, and he substituted the Walser House's woodwork and shingles for brick walls and tiled roofs. Oscar S. Lang, the estate's construction contractor, was hired to build the Barton House. By August 1903, Martin wrote to Isabelle that the Barton House's cost estimate had increased to $10,000.

Work on the Barton House began in late 1903. Martin mediated several disputes that arose between Lang and Wright. During the design process, the Martins objected to the presence of a porch on the southern wing of the Barton House, saying it would make the house too wide. In response, Wright told the Martins, "It seems to me that a house which is rather free in outline will do better [...] than would a more tightly compacted house." Martin still sought to reduce the construction cost, suggesting that the Walser plan be substituted for a less expensive plan, to which Wright sent Martin an itemized list of expenses and said the house's cost estimate had declined to $7,616, (Note: Equivalent to $219,000 in 2025) representing savings of about $2,000. (Note: Equivalent to $57,000 in 2025)

=== Usage ===
==== Early and mid-20th century ====
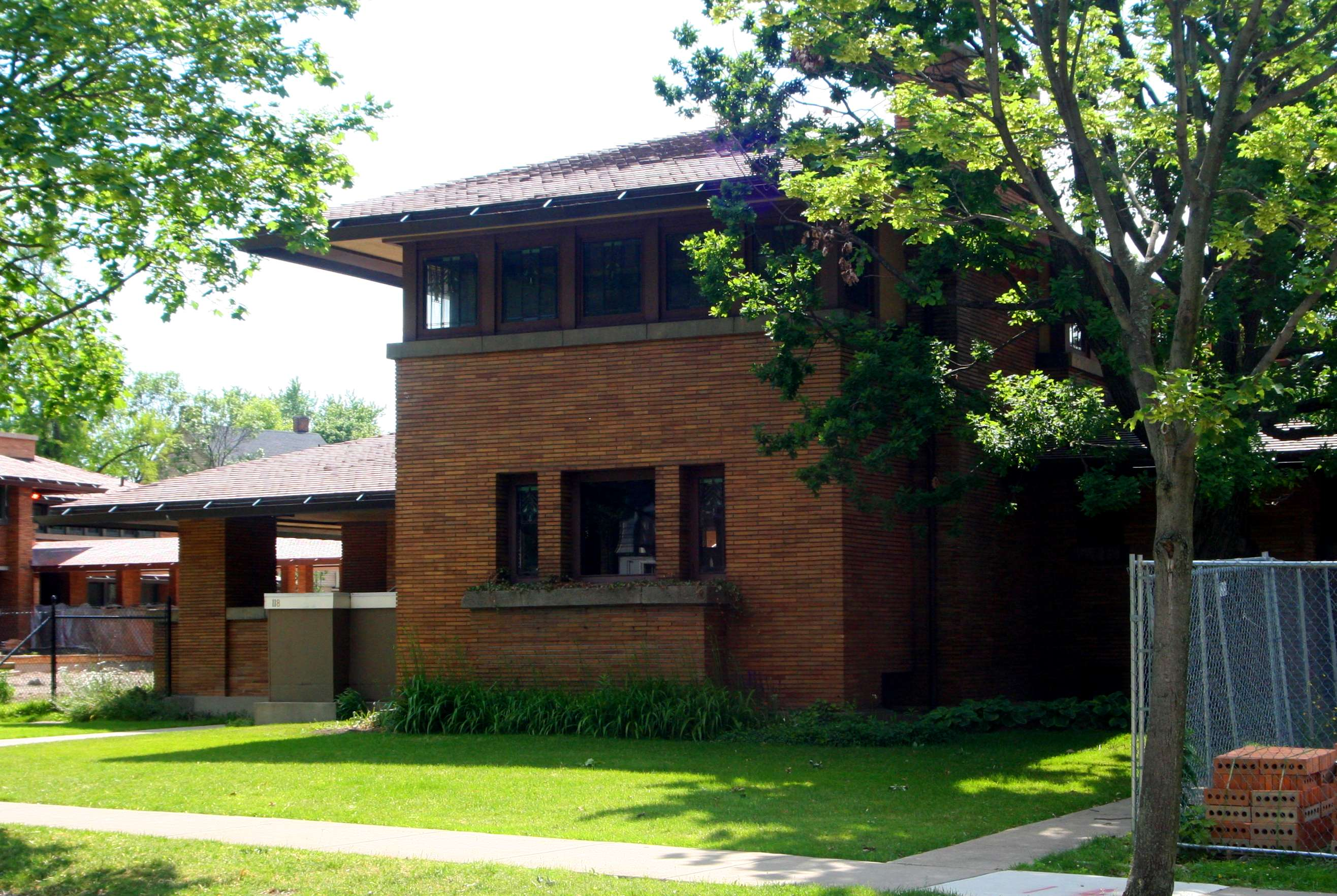
View from the east

The Barton House was completed in 1904; (Note: Some sources give a date of 1903; however, 1904 was the move-in date.) its $12,000 final cost was thrice the original budget. It had been the first building that Wright designed in a state on the US East Coast, and Martin subsequently hired Wright for the Martin House and Larkin Administration Building. Wright eventually designed about a dozen buildings for the Martins, (Note: Sources disagree on whether 11 or 15 were constructed. Brendan Gill writes that nine major buildings were constructed for the Martins, including the Martin, Barton, and gardener's house at the Martin estate, but excluding the pergola, conservatory, or carriage house.) including two other houses: the Martin House and their 1920s summer home at Graycliff. Delta and George Barton leased their house from Martin. Foreign scholars who studied maps of the estate confused the Barton House for the servant's quarters, since the site was so nondescript.

The Bartons and their daughter Laura moved into the house, living there for 25 years. The three Bartons often ate with the Martins and their two children. Laura moved to Bryn Mawr, Pennsylvania, before George Barton died in 1928. and Delta moved to Laura's house upon George's death. After Martin died in 1935, his widow Isabelle abandoned the estate shortly afterward. The Barton House was still occupied during this time. Some of the furniture was given to the Minneapolis Institute of Art. The pergola, conservatory, and carriage house between the Martin and Barton houses were demolished and replaced with apartment buildings in the early 1960s.

==== UB and MHRC use ====
In 1967, the State University of New York's University at Buffalo (UB) purchased the Martin estate for $60,100. (Note: Equivalent to $442,000 in 2025) Edgar Tafel restored both the Martin and Barton houses. The renovation cost the New York government $27,681. (Note: Equivalent to $204,000 in 2025) After the restoration, the Martin House again became a single-family residence, housing the university president, while the Barton House was given to UB's provost. The university sold the Barton House in 1967. By the 1970s, the house was owned by architect Eric Larrabee and his wife Eleanor, who continued to live there in the next decade. Eleanor Larrabee bought a dining table that could be folded or extended, similar in design to over a hundred tables that Wright ordered for many other houses. During that decade, the house's original dining room furniture sold for $594,000 in 1987, (Note: Equivalent to $1,442,000 in 2025) briefly becoming the highest-priced Wright-designed furniture.

When the Martin House Restoration Corporation (MHRC) began restoring the Martin estate in the early 1990s, Buffalo News publisher Stanford Lipsey partnered with M&T Bank and Rich Products to finance the renovation. The three groups collectively donated $350,000 to purchase the Barton House in 1994, and the house was acquired that July. (Note: Equivalent to $689,000 in 2025) Although the Barton House had never been abandoned or extensively modified, as the rest of the estate had, it still needed some repairs. The estate underwent restoration, including the Barton House, which had been renovated by the late 1990s. The modifications included roof replacements. By then, the house was open to the public for tours, albeit without furnishings on display.

The MHRC had a shop in the Barton House by the 2000s. The MHRC renovated the Barton House starting in September 2017, requiring the building to be closed for 12 months. The redesign, designed by HHL Architects, included restoring decorative fixtures such as art glass, lighting, plasterwork, and woodwork, along with upgrading utility systems. In addition, the chimney and masonry work was repaired. The renovation was finished in October 2018, having cost $2 million. Afterward, the house was accessible through tours of the Martin estate, and it was also rented out for events.

== Reception ==
In 1977, The New York Times architectural critic Ada Louise Huxtable wrote that the Barton House "has blossomed in sympathetic hands", contrasting with the Martin House's poor condition and the "mutilation" of the estate overall. The Globe and Mail wrote in 1988 that "the roof appears to float" above the second-story windows, and another writer for The New York Times, in 1998, called it a "subtly cruciform" structure. In the 21st century, the magazine Robb Report wrote that the building remained one of the best-preserved Prairie School houses designed by Wright. The writer Brendan Gill called it a "small and nearly perfect jewel", contrasting it with the Martins' main house, which he called "grand but gloomy".

== See also ==
- List of Frank Lloyd Wright works
- National Register of Historic Places listings in Buffalo, New York
- List of National Historic Landmarks in New York

== Sources ==
- Bayer, Mark H.; Steele, Zakery D. (2015). "Darwin D. Martin House Cultural Landscape Report" (PDF). Honeoye Falls, New York: Bayer Landscape Architecture.
- Gill, Brendan (1987). Many Masks: A Life of Frank Lloyd Wright. New York: G.P. Putnam's Sons. ISBN 978-0-399-13232-2.
- Historic Structures Report: D. D. Martin House, George Barton House, Gardener's Cottage (PDF) (Report). National Register of Historic Places, National Park Service. 1975.
- Jackson-Forsberg, Eric (2008). Historic Furnishings Report For Selected Spaces of the Darwin D. Martin House Buffalo, NY (PDF) (Report). Vol. 2. Martin House Restoration Corporation.
- McCarter, Robert (1997). Frank Lloyd Wright. London: Phaidon Press. ISBN 978-0-7148-3148-0.
- Quinan, Jack (2004). Frank Lloyd Wright's Martin House : architecture as portraiture. New York: Princeton Architectural Press. ISBN 978-1-56898-419-3.
- Secrest, Meryle (1998). Frank Lloyd Wright: A Biography. University of Chicago Press. ISBN 978-0-226-74414-8.
- Storrer, William Allin (1993). The Frank Lloyd Wright Companion. Chicago: University of Chicago Press. ISBN 978-0-226-77624-8. (S.303)
