= Morris chair =

Early type of reclining chair

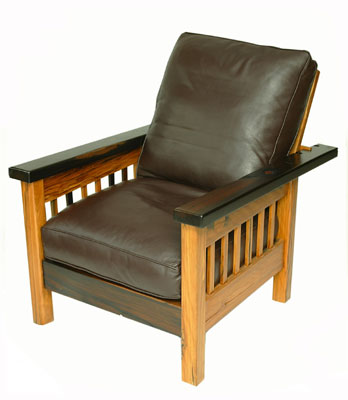
Recently constructed version of the Morris Chair

A Morris chair is an early type of reclining chair. The design was adapted by William Morris's firm, Morris & Company, from a prototype owned by Ephraim Colman in rural Sussex, England. It was first marketed around 1866.

== Styles ==
Morris chairs feature a seat with a reclining back and moderately high armrests, which give the chair an old-style appearance. The characteristic feature of a Morris chair is a hinged back, set between two un-upholstered arms, with the reclining angle adjusted through a row of pegs, holes, or notches in each arm. In other instances, the reclining of the back is controlled by a metal bar set in hooked back racks. The original Morris chair featured dark-stained woodwork, turned spindles, and heavily decorated upholstery, typical of the Victorian style.

The chair was widely copied after Morris' introduction, and is still manufactured. The appearance and style of upholstery is usually quite different from Morris's, but the overall layout is constant. There are two rather distinct types of these chairs. One type, known as the "traditional" Morris chair, evolved in America directly from the original Morris design. It often features carving and serpentine shapes. These chairs were produced in the hundreds of thousands from approximately 1890 to 1930 in various versions, ranging from affordable to very high-end. At the low price end, these chairs were sold by The Larkin Soap Company and other large firms such as Sears Roebuck and Montgomery Ward. The more expensive chairs were those made by Horner and other exclusive furniture makers.

The other style of Morris chair is called the "Mission" or the "Craftsman" Morris chair. The best known examples are those were first produced by Gustav Stickley in 1904 and then widely copied afterwards. These are in the American Craftsman idiom, rather than English Arts & Crafts styles. The woodwork is lightly finished and largely undecorated, featuring rectangular sections of oak. Upholstery comprises unframed cushions in brown leather, or green or brown fabric. The Craftsman or Mission style of Morris chair is often thought of as a Stickley design named in homage to Morris, rather than an original Morris piece. As with all Stickley, these chairs are keenly collected today, and originals fetch several thousand dollars.

The chair is a popular subject with amateur furniture makers, particularly in the US.
