= Blue Sky Mausoleum =

Frank Lloyd Wright design in Buffalo, New York

Coordinates: 42.922972°N 78.862562°W

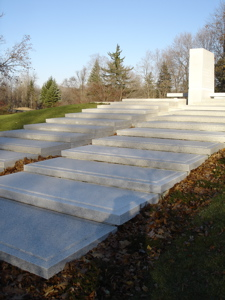
Blue Sky Mausoleum

Blue Sky Mausoleum, in Forest Lawn Cemetery in Buffalo, New York, is the 2004 completion of a 1928 design by Frank Lloyd Wright as a commercial cemetery project. The design was completed by a one-time apprentice to Wright, Anthony Puttnam.

Puttnam was also responsible for the posthumous completion of Wright's Monona Terrace building in Madison, Wisconsin in modified form, and he has defended both projects against accusations that they are inauthentic.

The Mausoleum was the last of four projects Darwin D. Martin commissioned from Wright; the others were his residential complex, the Larkin Administration Building, and Graycliff, their summer house.

== See also ==
- List of Frank Lloyd Wright works
