= Larkin Company =

American soap company (1875–1942)

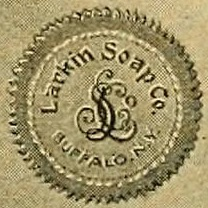
- Formerly: Larkin Soap Company
- Founded: 1875 in Buffalo, New York
- Defunct: 1942
- Headquarters: Buffalo, New York, United States
- Key people: John D. Larkin, Elbert Hubbard, Darwin D. Martin
- Products: "Combination Box," "Sweet Home Soap," "Boraxine" soap powder, "Jet" harness soap, "Oatmeal" toilet soap, Glycerine, "Pure White" toilet soap, and "Ocean Bath" soap
- Services: Mail-order
- Owner: John D. Larkin

The Larkin Company, also known as the Larkin Soap Company, was a company founded in 1875 in Buffalo, New York as a small soap factory. It grew tremendously throughout the late 1800s and into the first quarter of the 1900s with an approach called "The Larkin Idea" that transformed the company into a mail-order conglomerate that employed 2,000 people and had annual sales of $28.6 million (equivalent to $459,643,000 in 2025) in 1920. The company's success allowed them to hire Frank Lloyd Wright to design the iconic Larkin Administration Building which stood as a symbol of Larkin prosperity until the company's demise in the 1940s.

== History ==
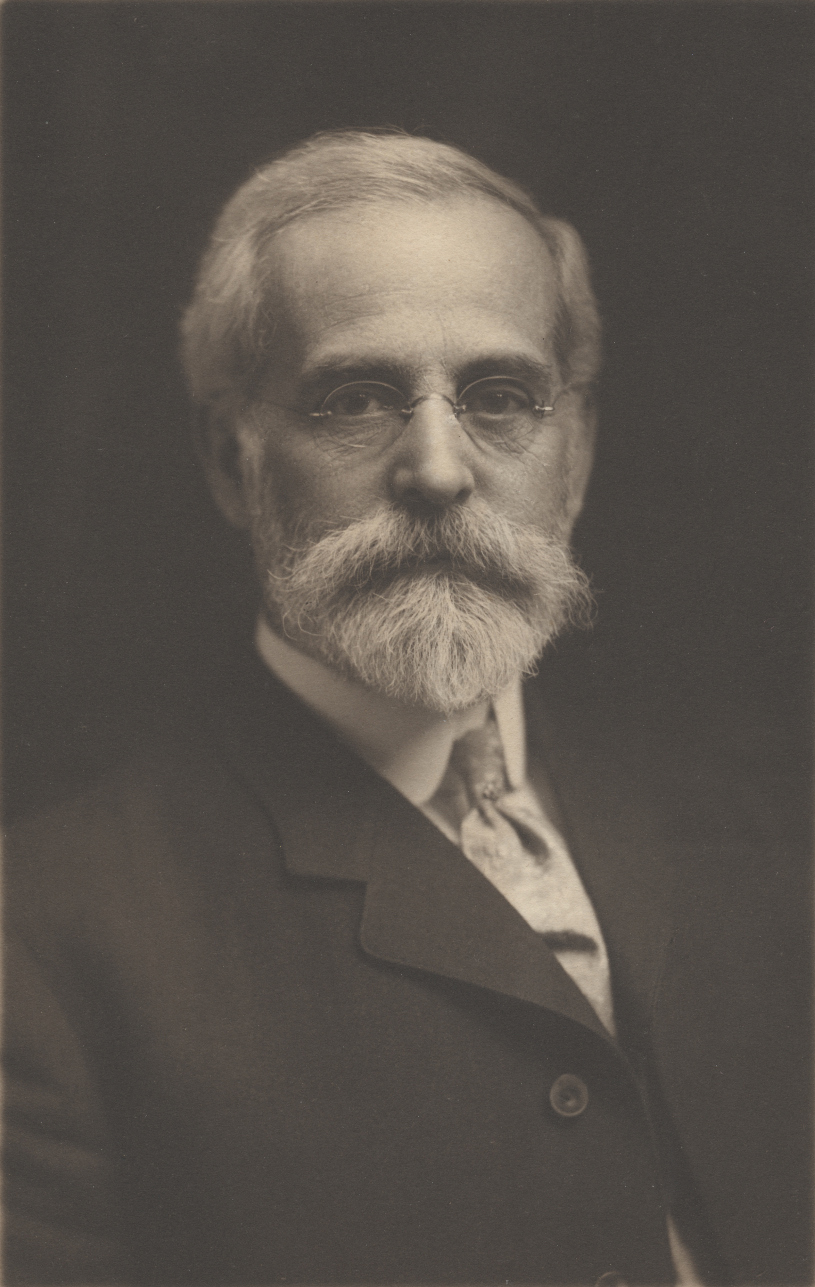
John D. Larkin

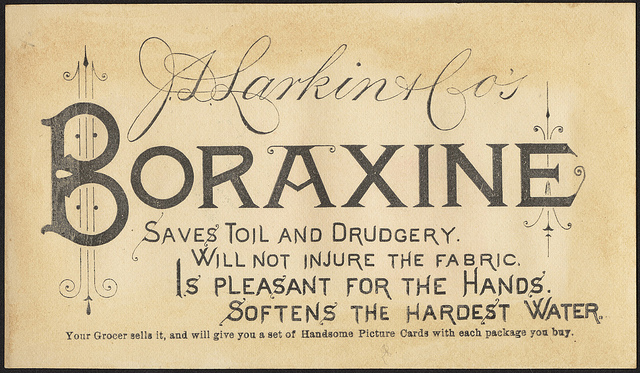
Boraxine advertisement from 1882

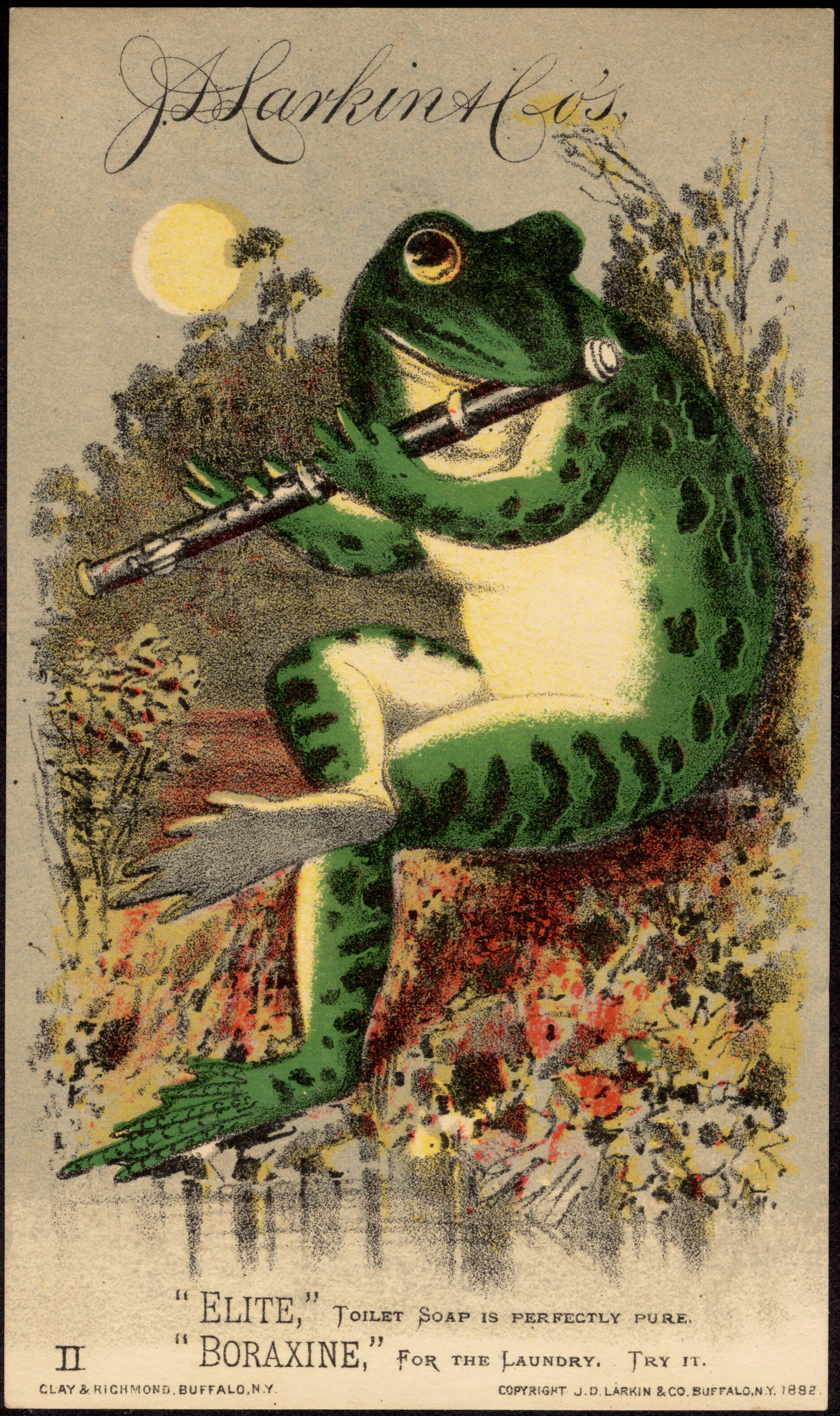
J. D. Larkin & Co's "Elite," toilet soap is perfectly pure. "Boraxine," for the laundry. Try it., 1882; from the 19th Century American Trade Cards collection of the Boston Public Library

The Larkin Company was founded in 1875 as "J. D. Larkin, Manufacturer of Plain and Fancy Soaps" when John D. Larkin sold his interest in his brother-in-law's company J. Weller & Co. in Chicago to set up his own factory in Buffalo, New York. His first product was a yellow laundry bar named "Sweet Home Soap."

Larkin's first salesman was his wife's brother, Elbert Hubbard, who had also been working for J. Weller & Co. in Chicago as a salesman. The business grew very quickly, and in 1877 Larkin bought land on Seneca Street in Buffalo and built his first factory. By 1878, the company was producing 9 different soap products, ranging from "Boraxine" soap powder, through a variety of laundry soaps to "Jet" harness soap, "Oatmeal" toilet soap and Glycerine. In 1878, 13-year-old Darwin D. Martin was hired as a salesman in Boston. By 1880, as sales to general stores and other merchants who would buy products in large quantities increased, Martin relocated to Buffalo and became the first, and at that time the only, hired office-worker of the Larkin Company, as all office work was done by Larkin himself.

== "The Larkin Idea" ==
In 1881, the company initiated door-to-door sales to private residences to complement its mail solicitation to storekeepers. To establish brand identity and keep up with competitors, Hubbard inserted a modest premium into every box of soap starting with a color picture of the company's logo. This coincided with the growth of the company's mail-order business and the strategy of gift premiums escalated quickly into larger and more interesting souvenir picture cards than his competitors. From there, Larkin and Hubbard began experimenting and refining the practice. Soon a handkerchief was included with the "Pure White" toilet soap and then a bath towel with the purchase of "Ocean Bath" soap.

Larkin and Hubbard decided to market directly to consumers, and by 1885 had eliminated all middlemen, including their own salesmen. With the money saved on sales commissions, Larkin was able to offer better premiums. In 1891, Larkin placed its first large wholesale order, $40,000 (equivalent to $1,433,000 in 2025) worth of piano lamps. The next year it expanded into Morris Chairs worth $80,000 (equivalent to $2,867,000 in 2025) and oak dining chairs worth $125,000 (equivalent to $4,479,000 in 2025). One of the most popular giveaways was the Chatauqua Desk. For a $10 order of soap, the customer would receive the soap and the desk, a $10 premium. The idea grabbed the attention of the public, and through further refinement, Larkin began offering a variety of both products and premiums. The "Combination Box", advertised in the 1890s, offered enough soap and toiletry products to last an average family one year.

In 1893, the catalog was sent to 1.5 million customers. To meet customer demand as the business grew, Larkin found it necessary to manufacture its own goods for the most popular premiums. Various subsidiaries were developed including a furniture factory in Buffalo to assemble pieces cut in Tennessee as well as the establishment of Buffalo Pottery in 1901 to meet the demand for premiums. The Greensburg, Pennsylvania Glass Company produced all of the bottles and related glassware and contracts were negotiated with Oneida to furnish plated silverware and the Buffalo Garment Center made men's apparel.

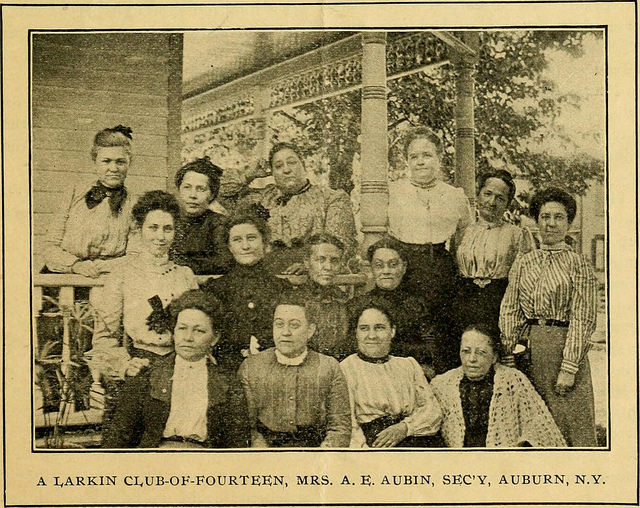
Larkin Club from Auburn, NY in 1902

The Larkin company later recruited housewives, called "Larkin Secretaries," and neighborhood children to market their products door-to-door, much like Avon products are now sold. The Larkin Secretaries organized "Larkin Clubs" of ten members that were set up so each month each member of the club would pledge to order $1 worth of Larkin goods. One member was then selected at random to receive the $10 premium and the next month the premium would go to another member.

The period from 1892 to 1904 saw rapid growth in sales from just under $500,000 (equivalent to $17,917,000 in 2025) to over $13,000,000 (equivalent to $465,833,000 in 2025) in 1904. By 1901, Larkin was big enough to have its own building at the Pan-American Exposition. By 1905, the catalog was offering over 115 products, including soaps, toiletries, shampoo, coffee and teas, extracts, cocoa, spices, chocolate, soups, perfumes. By 1912, the Larkin Catalogue was second only to the Sears Catalog in variety of products being offered.

Tremendous amounts of Larkin advertising were produced including flyers, magazines, catalogs and brochures. "The Larkin Idea" was a promotional magazine for the club secretaries that listed new products and marketing strategies and encouraged members to set up "Larkin Pantries," whole areas in their homes stocked with Larkin goods as a way to generate sales from their neighbors. The company promoted home decorating with the "Larkin Look." By 1920, a home could be completely decorated with Larkin goods, from furniture to rugs, silverware, table lamps, curtains, clocks, school supplies, toys, jewelry, clothing, and bibles. Branch offices were opened all over the country, including Cleveland, Pittsburgh, Boston, Philadelphia, and Chicago.

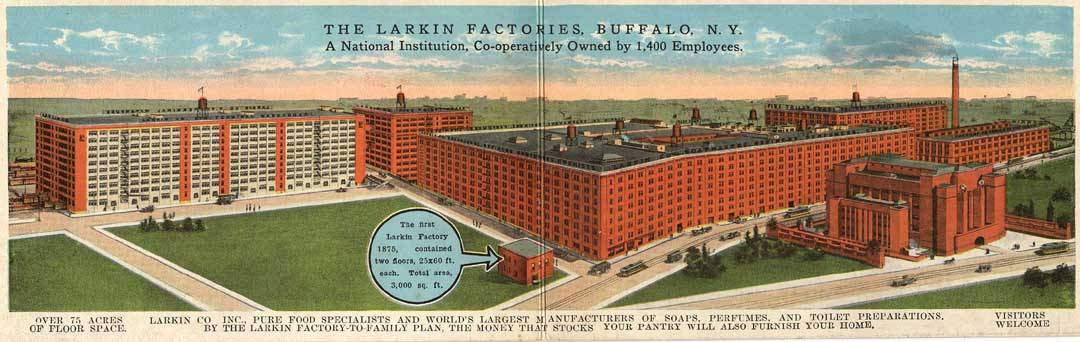
Larkin Company Factories c.1910

By 1925, Larkin had approximately 900 catalog items and factories covering sixteen-and-a-half acres and reached peak levels in the late 1920s with over 1,000 products and average yearly sales were $15.5 million and over 4,000 employees.

== Later years ==
Elbert Hubbard retired in the 1890s, and went on to found the Roycroft artisan community in East Aurora, New York, a realization of the Arts and Crafts Movement. He and his second wife, Alice Moore Hubbard, died aboard the RMS Lusitania, when it was sunk by a German submarine on May 7, 1915.

Darwin D. Martin became Corporate Secretary and guided the company through its rise to a Corporate Institution until his retirement in 1925. He created a unique card ledger system for tracking sales and maintaining accounts which is utilized by many corporations, in various formats, to this day. He was instrumental in Frank Lloyd Wright receiving the commission to design the Larkin Administration Building, his home in Buffalo and a summer home called Graycliff.

John D. Larkin died in 1926 at which point John D. Larkin Jr. took over control of the company. The growth of department stores, the growing usage of the automobile and the volatility of the marketplace, especially during the Great Depression, damaged the Larkin Company's mail-order business. John D. Larkin Jr. attempted to diversify Larkin with a chain of retail food markets, gasoline stations, home craft stores, and a department store, but ultimately all efforts were unsuccessful.

Internal struggles among the next generation of Larkin executives and the loss of key executives precipitated the demise of the company. Sales fell from a high of $28.6 million in 1920 to $2 million by 1939. The company was sold in 1941, liquidated in 1942, and the new owners continued a mail-order business until 1962.

== Larkin Buildings ==
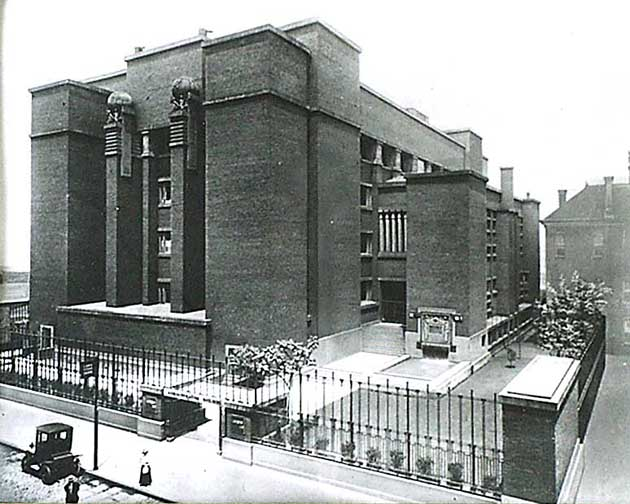
Larkin Administration Building in 1906

By 1902, Larkin needed a building to consolidate offices scattered throughout all of his factories. Martin, and William Heath, Larkin's brother-in-law and the head of the Legal Department, suggested Frank Lloyd Wright. Larkin consented and Wright received his first commercial commission, the Larkin Administration Building which was completed in 1904 and accommodated 1,800 corresponding secretaries, clerks, and executives. The Larkin Administration Building was demolished in 1950.

Larkin built the Larkin Company Building in Chicago in 1912, to serve its operations in Illinois and adjacent states.

Larkin, known for its generous corporate culture, also commissioned Wright to design row houses for its workers, which were never built.

A large portion of the original Larkin manufacturing complex survives today including the Larkin Terminal Warehouse which has been converted to corporate offices and housed the headquarters of First Niagara Bank, which has been acquired by KeyBank. The surrounding neighborhood is now called "Larkinville" and has been converted into a mixed-use area.

== Gallery ==
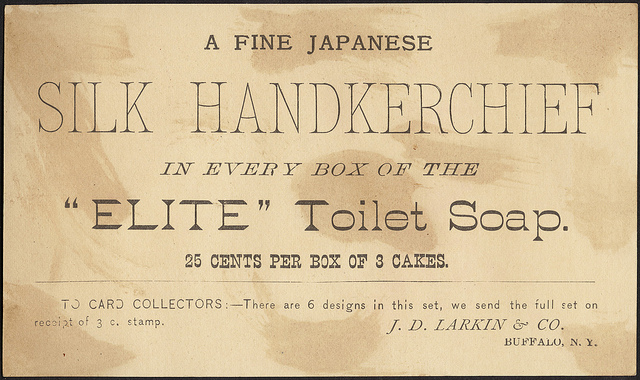
"Elite" toilet soap advertisement from 1882

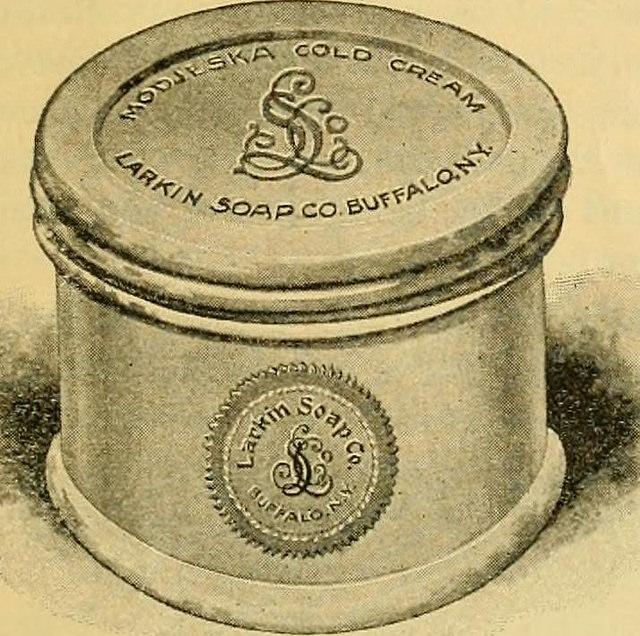
Modjeska Cold Cream advertisement from 1902

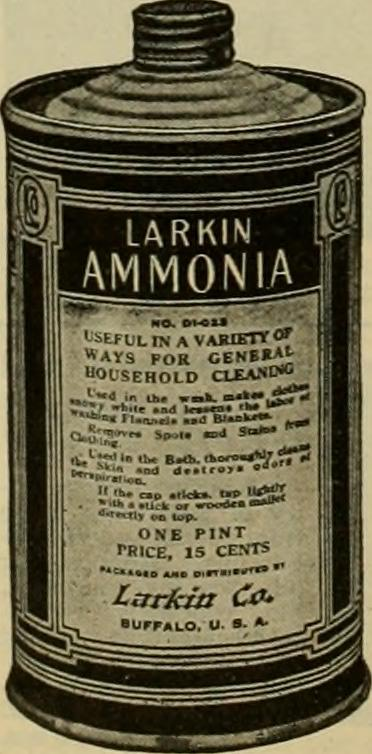
Ammonia advertisement from 1915

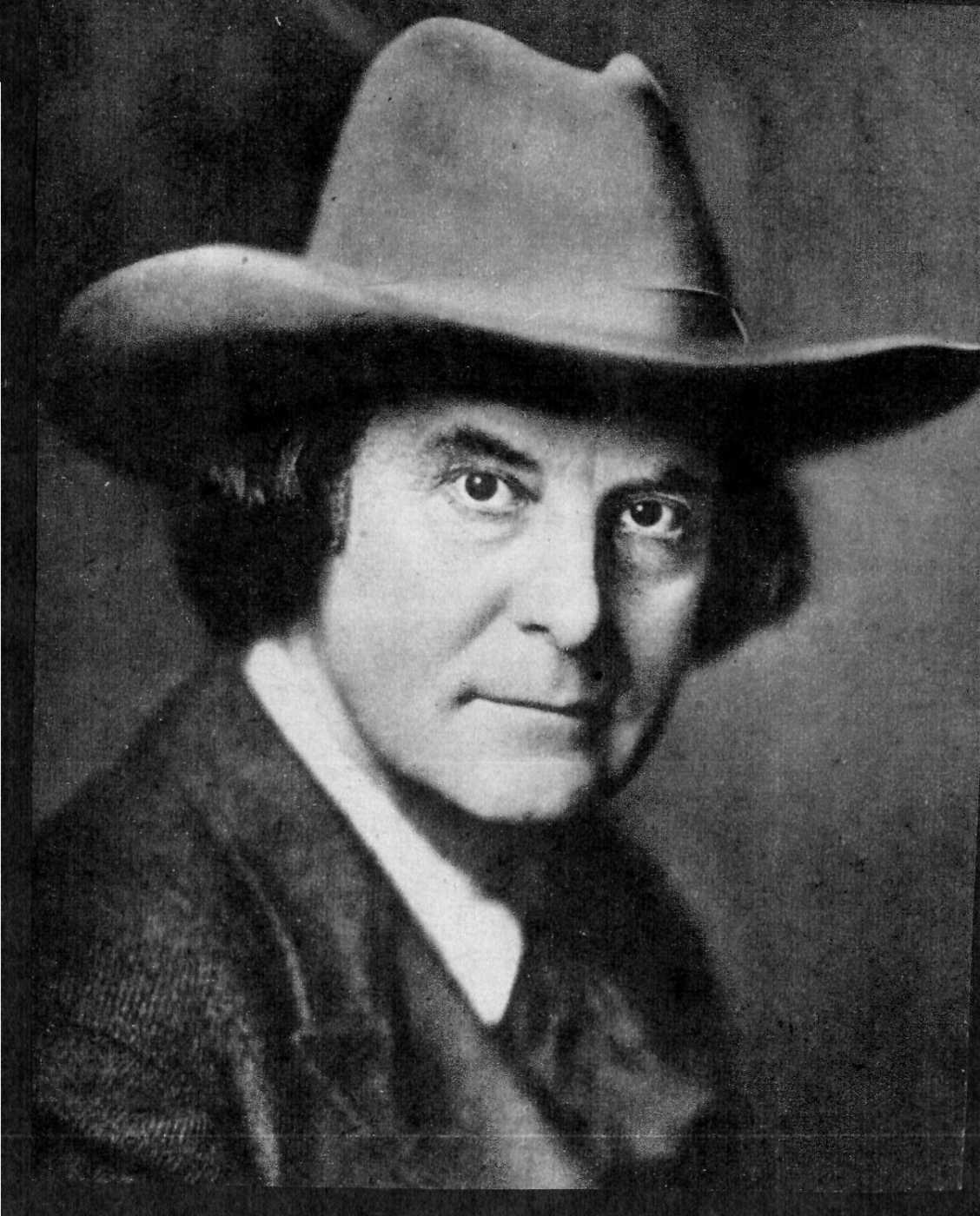
Elbert Hubbard, founder of Roycroft after his retirement from the Larkin Co.

== See also ==
- John D. Larkin
- Elbert Hubbard
- Darwin D. Martin
- Buffalo Pottery
- William R. Heath
- Walter V. Davidson
- Frank Lloyd Wright
- Larkin Administration Building
- Larkin Terminal Warehouse
- Mail Order Business
