= Darwin D. Martin =

American businessman (1865–1935)

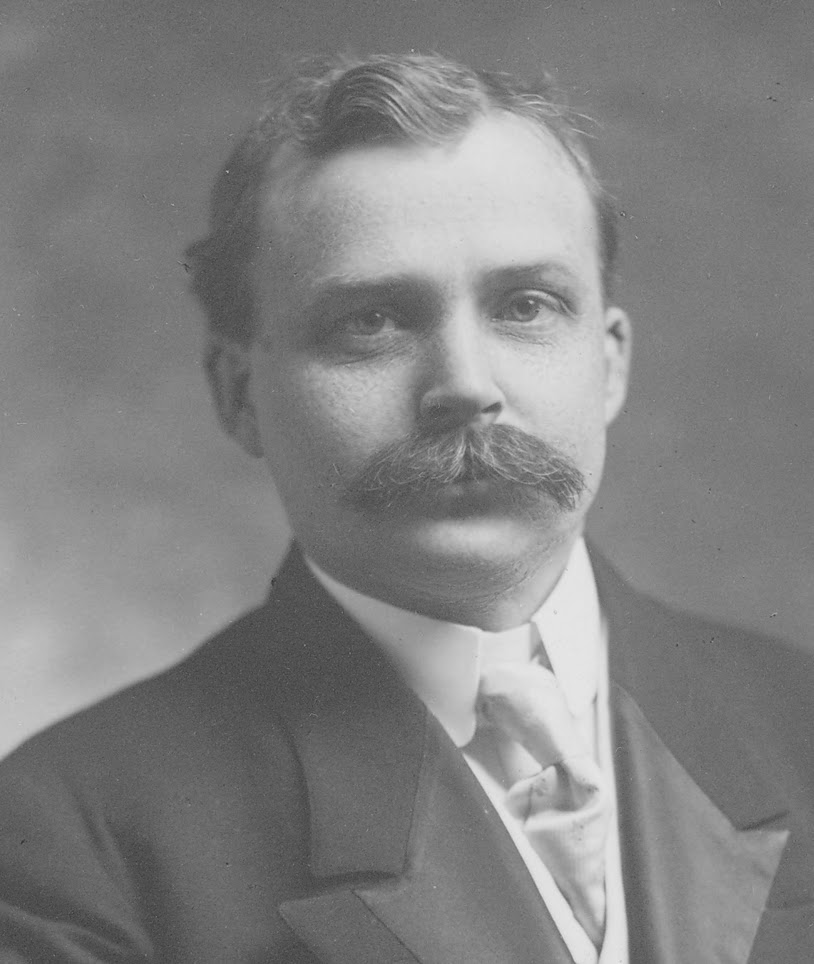
- Born: Darwin Denice Martin; October 25, 1865; Bouckville, New York, US
- Died: December 17, 1935 (aged 70); Buffalo, New York, US
- Resting place: Forest Lawn Cemetery, Buffalo
- Occupation: Corporate Secretary of the Larkin Company
- Spouse: Isabelle Reidpath (m. 1889)
- Children: 2
- Relatives: George F. Barton (brother-in-law)

Darwin Denice Martin (October 25, 1865 – December 12, 1935) was an American businessman best known for the house he commissioned Frank Lloyd Wright to design in Buffalo, New York. He was corporate secretary of the Larkin Company.

== Early life ==
Darwin Martin was born on October 25, 1865, in Bouckville, New York, an upstate New York community. His siblings included Louis Franklin ("Frank") Martin, William Martin, Delta Martin (who married George F. Barton), and Maude Martin Huffer. Martin had a difficult childhood, starting with the death of his mother when he was six. Martin's family was separated, and Martin, who was the youngest of five, was forced to part ways with all his siblings except for his brother Frank.

== Larkin Company ==
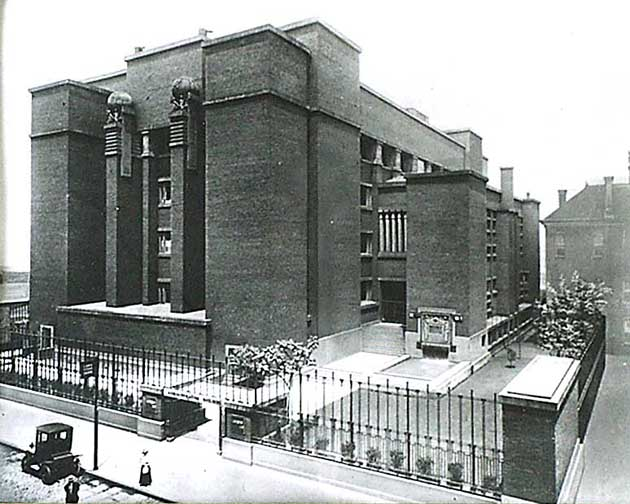
Larkin Administration Building

The two Martin brothers went to New York City and Darwin obtained a job selling soap. Martin then came by himself to Buffalo to work in the Larkin Company as the first, and at that time the only, hired office-worker of the Larkin Company, as all office work was done by Larkin himself. One of the figures in the company who Martin admired was Elbert Hubbard, an executive. Martin worked ferociously, putting in 361 workdays a year. His efforts enabled the company to expand and rival Sears and Roebuck Co. He is credited with converting all the company customer records from cumbersome ledgers to efficient card catalogs, a pioneering advance in business record-keeping at the time. In 1890, Darwin D. Martin replaced Hubbard as corporate secretary of Larkin Company. One of his assignments was to find an architect to design a new administrative building for the expanding company. His brother, William Martin, who was living in Chicago, recommended a young architect named Frank Lloyd Wright.

While at Larkin, Martin created a unique card ledger system for tracking sales and maintaining accounts which is utilized by many corporations, in various formats, to this day. Martin retired from the Larkin Company in 1925, and in 1929, construction began on Graycliff.

== Friendship with Wright ==
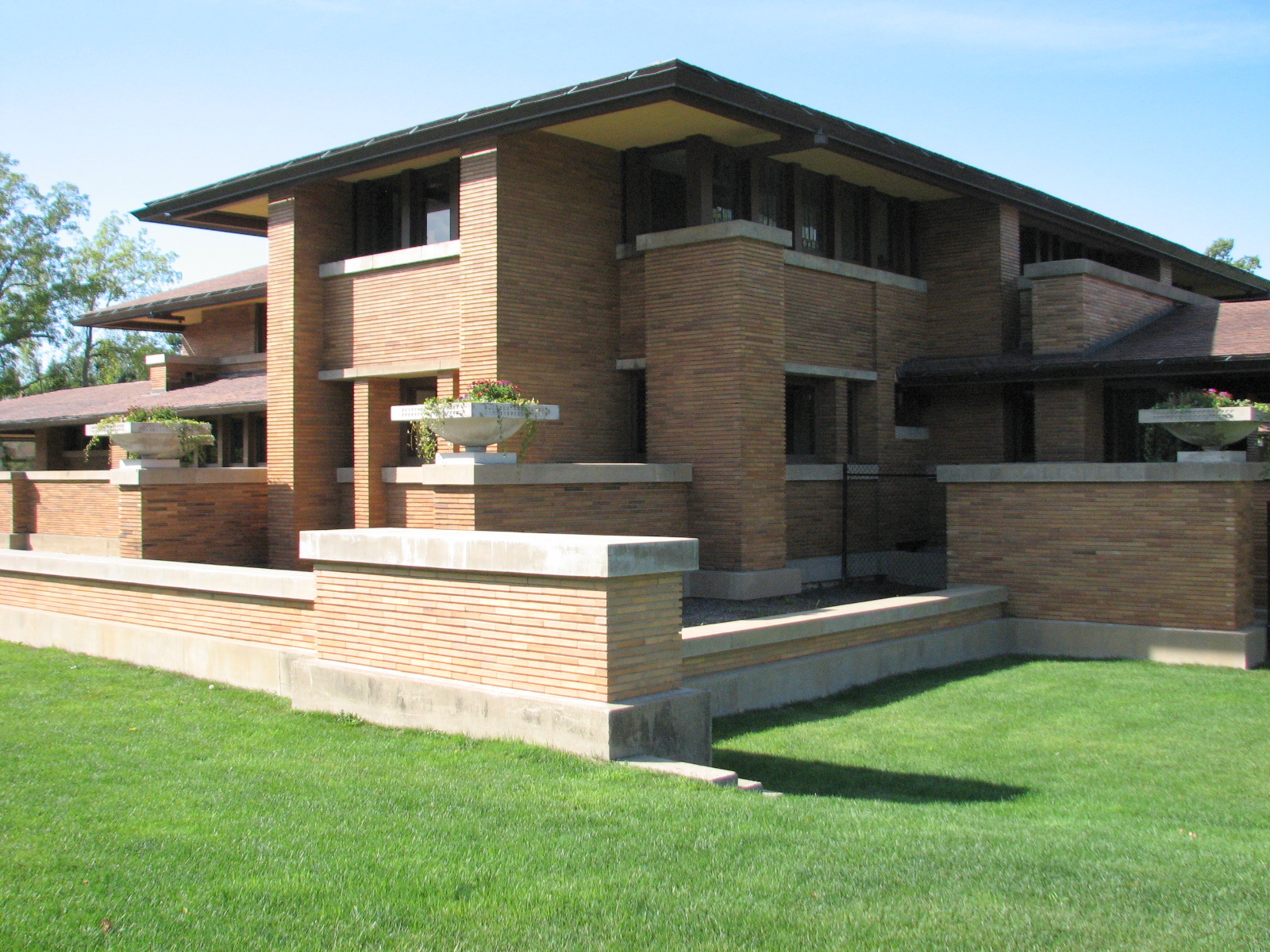
Martin House

Martin and Wright formed a lifelong friendship due to their similar outlooks on family. Although John D. Larkin, the company president, was unimpressed by Wright, Martin convinced Larkin to give Wright the job. By this time Martin had built a considerable fortune and asked Wright to design a house for him as well. This project would become the historic Darwin D. Martin House. Wright had complete freedom and an almost unlimited budget to execute it.

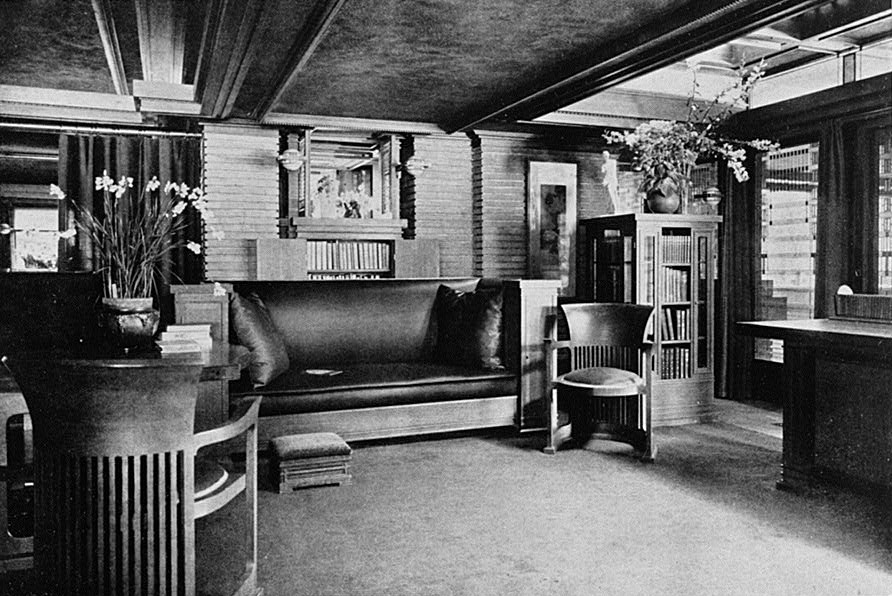
Interior of Martin House

Isabelle Reidpath Martin, Darwin's wife, was unhappy with the house due to the limited light it received, as she was nearly blind. Darwin and Isabelle and their two children, however, would live there for over 20 years. During this time Martin's fortune continued to rise, while Wright, with whom he kept in constant contact, fell on troubled times. Martin began to lend Wright money, becoming the largest benefactor behind Wright's Taliesin. At one point Wright solicited Martin to become his business partner. Martin declined, having just retired from the Larkin Company. During a fallow period in Wright's career, Martin commissioned him to design a summer home, Graycliff, stressing that this house was to conform to Isabelle's desires. The result was one of Wright's most important mid-career designs, taking extensive advantage of Graycliff's location on a bluff overlooking Lake Erie. The largest of the three buildings at Graycliff, the Isabelle R. Martin House, is transparent, allowing views of the lake through the house. Terraces and cantilevered balconies enhance the organic nature of the buildings.

== Downfall and death ==
Martin was a millionaire when the great stock market crash occurred. Overnight, he lost almost everything. When Wright's autobiography came out, Martin was so impoverished he could not afford to buy a $6.00 copy. In a letter Wright said that of the mere six copies he was receiving, Darwin Martin would receive one if no one else. The money that Martin had lent Wright, over seventy thousand dollars, was never repaid.

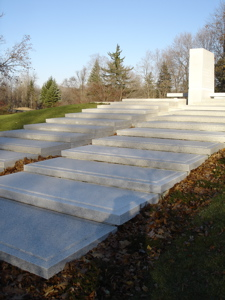
Blue Sky Mausoleum at Forest Lawn Cemetery, Buffalo

After a series of strokes, Darwin Martin died in 1935 at the age of 70. He is buried in Forest Lawn Cemetery. Wright designed his only cemetery monument, the "Blue Sky Mausoleum," at Darwin Martin's request, but because of the family's declining fortunes, it was not built until 2004, when Forest Lawn administrators erected the Blue Sky monument in honor of Martin and Wright.

Some of Martin's papers survive in the collection of the Buffalo History Museum.

== Personal life ==
In 1889, Martin married Isabelle Reidpath (1869–1945) and remained married to her until his death in 1935. Martin and Isabelle had two children.

Martin died of a stroke in 1935 at age 70. Isabelle died in Buffalo in 1945.

== See also ==
- Larkin Administration Building
