= Darwin D. Martin House =

Historic house in Buffalo, New York

- U.S. National Register of Historic Places
- U.S. National Historic Landmark
- U.S. Historic district – Contributing property
- New York State Register of Historic Places
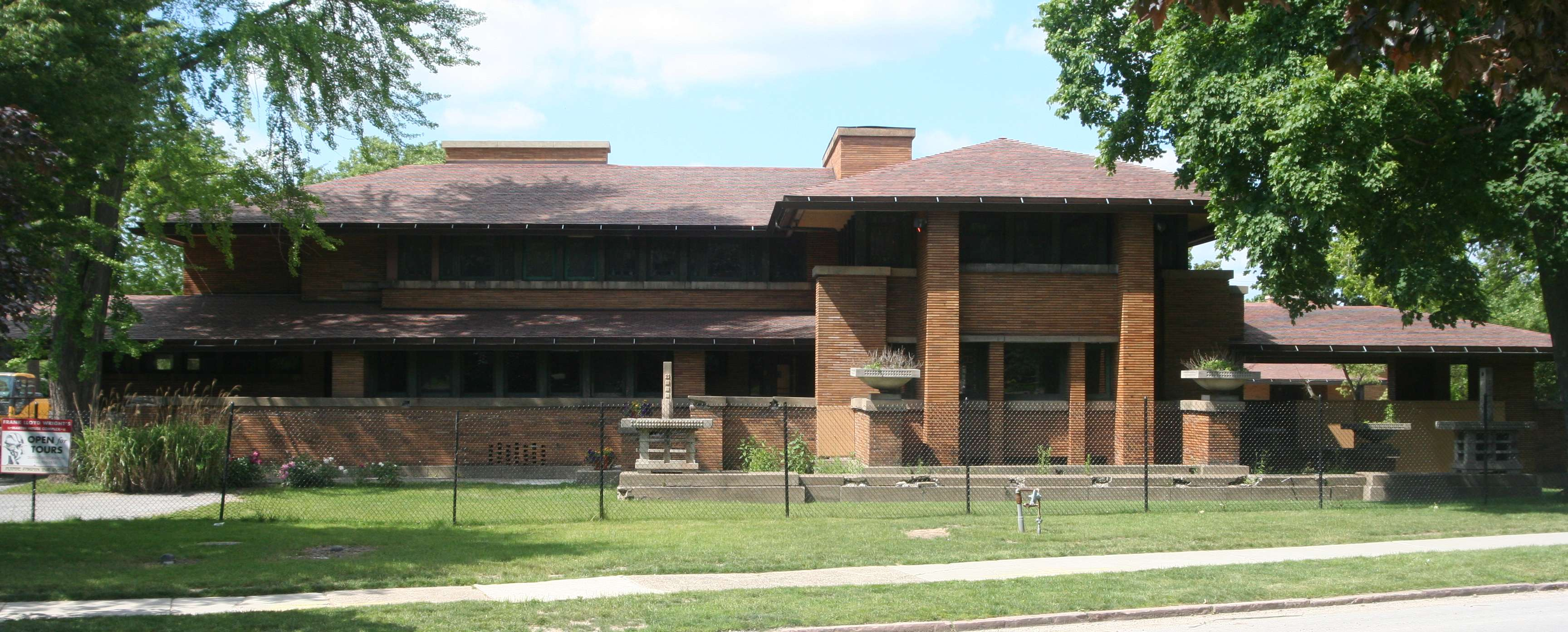

- Location within New York Location within the United States
- Interactive map showing the Martin House
- Location: 125 Jewett Parkway, Buffalo, New York
- Coordinates: 42°56′10″N 78°50′53″W
- Built: 1903–1907
- Architects: Frank Lloyd Wright, Walter Burley Griffin
- Architectural style: Prairie School
- Part of: Parkside East Historic District (ID86002817)
- NRHP reference No.: 75001185 (NRHP listing); 86000160 (NHL listing)
- NYSRHP No.: 02940.005230 (Martin House); 02940.005583 (Barton House); 02940.005809 (Gardener's House); 02940.038631 (Conservatory); 02940.038632 (Carriage House)

Significant dates
- Added to NRHP: 1975-12-30
- Designated NHL: 1986-02-24
- Designated NYSRHP: 1980-06-23

The Darwin D. Martin House is a historic house museum in the Parkside East Historic District of Buffalo, New York, United States. Built for businessman Darwin D. Martin and his wife Isabelle, it is the main house of a six-building estate designed by Frank Lloyd Wright. The main house is located at 125 Jewett Parkway, at the south end of the estate, and was built between 1903 and 1907. The complex also includes a pergola, a conservatory, a carriage house, a gardener's cottage, and the smaller George Barton House, along with a newer visitor center by Toshiko Mori and landscaping by Walter Burley Griffin. The complex is operated by the Martin House Restoration Corporation (MHRC).

At the recommendation of his older brother William, Darwin Martin hired Wright to design a house in 1902. Following financial turmoil and Darwin Martin's death in 1935, the family abandoned the house in 1937, after which it was vacant for nearly two decades. The city seized the property in 1946, and the Roman Catholic Diocese of Buffalo purchased it in 1951, but it remained empty until architect Sebastian Tauriello bought it in the mid-1950s, divided the main house into apartments, and demolished the carriage house, conservatory, and pergola. In 1967 the estate was purchased by the University at Buffalo (UB), which resold the Barton House and gardener's cottage, keeping only the main house. Restoration efforts began in the 1990s under UB, the New York state government, and the MHRC. The project included renovating the main house, reacquiring the Barton and gardener's residences, rebuilding the three demolished structures, and constructing a visitor center. The renovations were completed in 2019, having cost $50 million over three decades.

The buildings are designed in the Prairie style, with decorations such as Roman brick, concrete trim, and red roof tiles, and are arranged along two perpendicular axes. The main house has a cruciform layout with a porte-cochère to the west, a veranda to the east, and intersecting one- and two-story wings. Its exterior has "tree of life" art glass windows, as well as overlapping roofs on several levels. The house's interior spans about 15,000 square feet (1,400 m^{2}) across two levels and a basement, with furniture designed by Wright. The Barton House, to the northeast, is also two stories tall and uses similar materials. There is also a gardener's cottage to the west, along with the rebuilt pergola, carriage house, and conservatory at the center of the estate. Mori's visitor center, the Eleanor and Wilson Greatbatch Pavilion, is west of the main house and has a glass-walled design.

Wright was especially fond of the Martin House design, referring to it for some 50 years as his "opus". Over the years, the Martin House has received extensive architectural commentary. Retrospective reviewers described the Martin House as one of Wright's major Prairie-style works. The house and its architectural details have been depicted in many media works, and its art glass has been featured in exhibitions. The house is designated as a National Historic Landmark, and the complex is a New York State Historic Site.

== Site ==
The Darwin D. Martin House is located in Buffalo, New York, United States. It is part of the Parkside East Historic District, a neighborhood laid out by Frederick Law Olmsted and Calvert Vaux. The Martin House is the main building of a six-building estate designed by architect Frank Lloyd Wright. The estate spans 1.5 acres (65,000 ft^{2}; 6,100 m^{2}), (Note: This is the figure given by multiple sources. A fact sheet for the house gives the area as 29,080 square feet (0.668 acres; 2,702 m^{2}). Another source gives an area of 1.25 acres (54,000 sq ft; 5,100 m^{2}). When Darwin Martin acquired the land in 1902, he initially bought roughly 1.3 acres (0.53 ha) for the Martin and Barton houses; another plot for the gardener's cottage, totaling 0.2 acres (0.081 ha), was obtained later.) covering five or six lots on the northern sidewalk of Jewett Parkway. The estate runs between Woodward Avenue to the west and Summit Avenue to the east; it has a frontage of 200 feet (61 m) on Jewett Parkway and 300 feet (91 m) on Summit Avenue. Just outside the house is a Reddy bikeshare station.

The streets surrounding the Martin estate have an irregular pattern, curving around the streets of the Delaware Park System. The estate was once part of the landholdings of Elam Jewett, who in the mid-19th century purchased a 400-acre (160 ha) section of Daniel Chapin's farm. After Olmsted and Vaux laid out the Delaware Park System in the 1870s, they devised a street grid for the area east of the park, intending to construct a suburb there. Jewett Parkway, named for Jewett, was laid out as a curving east–west street and transferred to city ownership in 1884. After a period of slow development, Summit and Woodward avenues were constructed in the late 1880s and early 1890s.

=== Landscape design ===
Wright's associate Walter Burley Griffin landscaped the grounds, which were intended as an integral part of the architectural design. A 2015 report subdivides the grounds into seven sections (excluding the house's conservatory; see Darwin D. Martin House § Outbuildings). Five of these sections have frontages on the street, while two flank the pergola at the center of the estate. Low brick walls, similar to those in the main house, cross the grounds. Plantings are placed on the boundaries between the various zones. As planned, there were to be a series of terraces surrounding the house.

Flowers on the grounds included columbine, delphinium, hollyhock, lupine, and phlox. The floricycle consists of a semi-circular garden with a variety of plant species, chosen for their offset flowering cycles to ensure blooms throughout the growing season. The modern-day floricycle includes 20,000 plantings in concentric rows surrounding the main house. Other plantings included flower gardens flanking the estate's pergola, as well as rectangular beds flanking some of the walls in the estate. Wright preserved some of the existing trees. The garden also included two sculptures by Wright collaborator Richard Bock. One of them, Spring, has since been relocated to the Bock Museum at Greenville College; a replica of Spring was made for the house in 2008.

Site plan of the estate

== History ==
=== Development ===
The Martin House was designed for businessman Darwin D. Martin and his wife Isabelle (née Reidpath). Martin, who joined the Larkin Company as a soap salesman at age 13, eventually became a senior executive at the company. He moved to Summit Avenue in Parkside East in 1888 and married Isabelle the next year. He also purchased additional land in the early 1890s, which he quickly resold. Darwin's sister Delta Barton and her husband George moved to Buffalo in 1895 after George began working at the Larkin Company. By the beginning of the 20th century, Martin's net worth had reached $2.5 million. (Note: Equivalent to $79.4 million in 2025) He was typical of Frank Lloyd Wright's early clients, who tended to be wealthy and who were open-minded enough to accept Wright's then-unconventional designs despite the ridicule targeted at them. Isabelle was encouraging Darwin to build a house befitting his wealth, but did not want Darwin to move to the countryside.

==== Commission and design ====
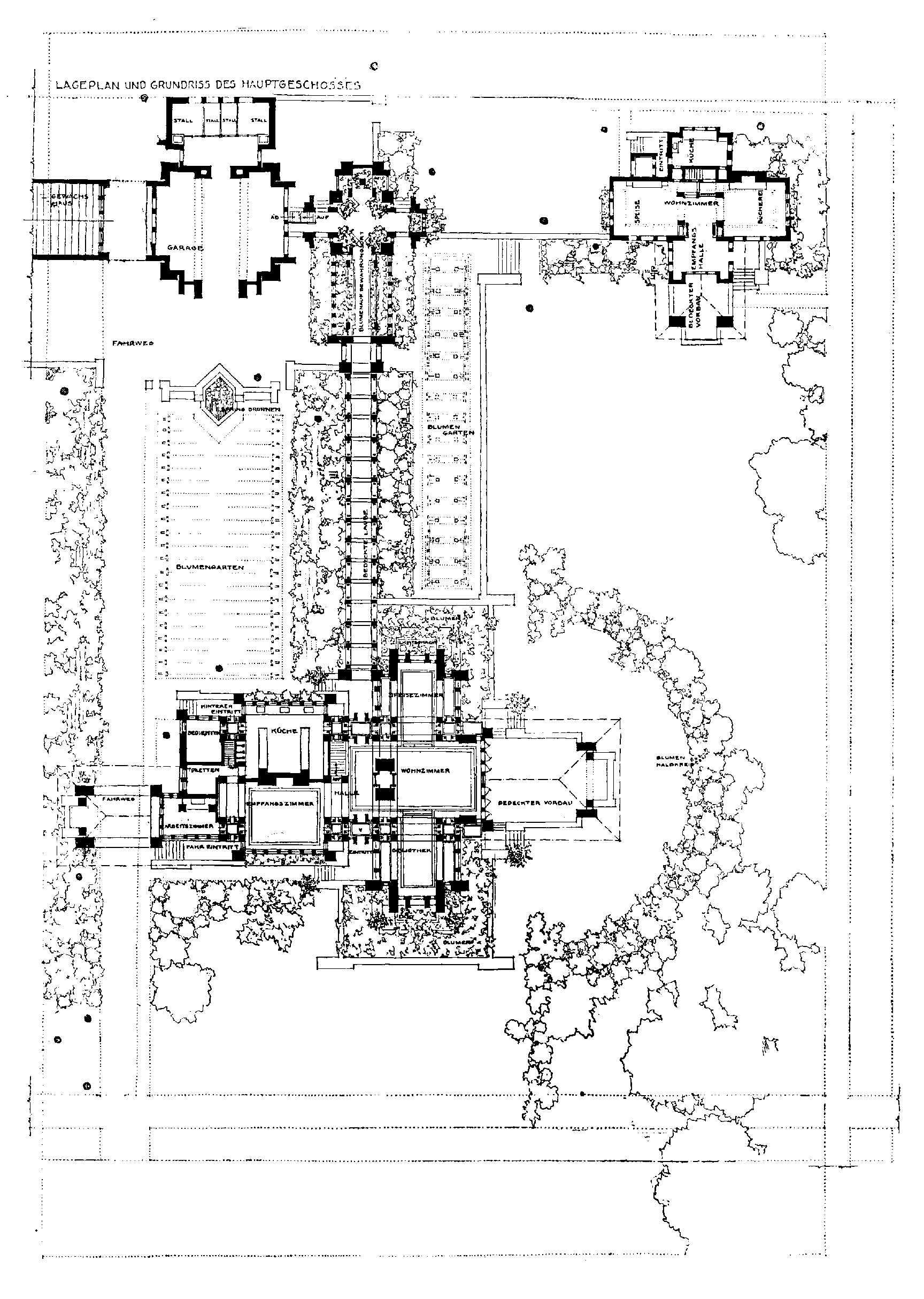
Landscape plan

Darwin went to Illinois in September 1902 to visit his brother William; the pair went to Oak Park, Illinois, where they saw some houses designed by Wright and, in Wright's absence, met with his assistant Walter Burley Griffin. The next month, William wrote to Darwin, praising Wright as "one of Nature's noblemen" and recommending that the architect design both Darwin's house and a new Larkin Company building. Darwin's brother and colleagues were enthusiastic about having Wright design their respective buildings, which may have influenced his decision to select Wright to design his house. Darwin thus wrote back to Wright, who traveled to Buffalo that November. The Darwin Martin and Larkin commissions were Wright's first in Buffalo; at the time, Wright had designed dozens of buildings, albeit mostly in the Midwestern US. In December 1902, Darwin paid $14,000 (Note: Equivalent to $421,000 in 2025) for 1 1/3 acres (0.54 ha) at the intersection of Summit Avenue and Jewett Parkway, just south of his existing house. This site occupied a visually prominent corner, and Wright preferred it to another, narrower site that Martin owned at Oakland Place.

In January 1903, Wright sent a preliminary design to William Martin; Isabelle said the plan "does not show care and appreciation of the needs of the house", and Darwin was critical of the interior despite liking the exterior design. Wright drew a primitive sketch of the Martin estate that May, which included the Martin House, as well as the Barton House for Darwin's sister and brother-in-law. This initial plan was based on an incorrect perception of where the surrounding streets were, as the Martin House faced the driveway at the western end of the site. Wright drew a second plan that December, repositioning the houses and sketching out a pergola, porch, porte-cochère, and floor plans; the revised design was based on a design published in the Ladies' Home Journal. Darwin expressed concerns that the revised design was too large for the family, and in early 1904, Wright devised a more compact first-floor plan. Darwin sent Wright several questions over the next few months, with little written response. Wright's team finished plans for the conservatory and stable in May 1904. To Darwin's consternation, the revised plan for the rest of the estate, including the main house, was delayed.

==== Construction ====
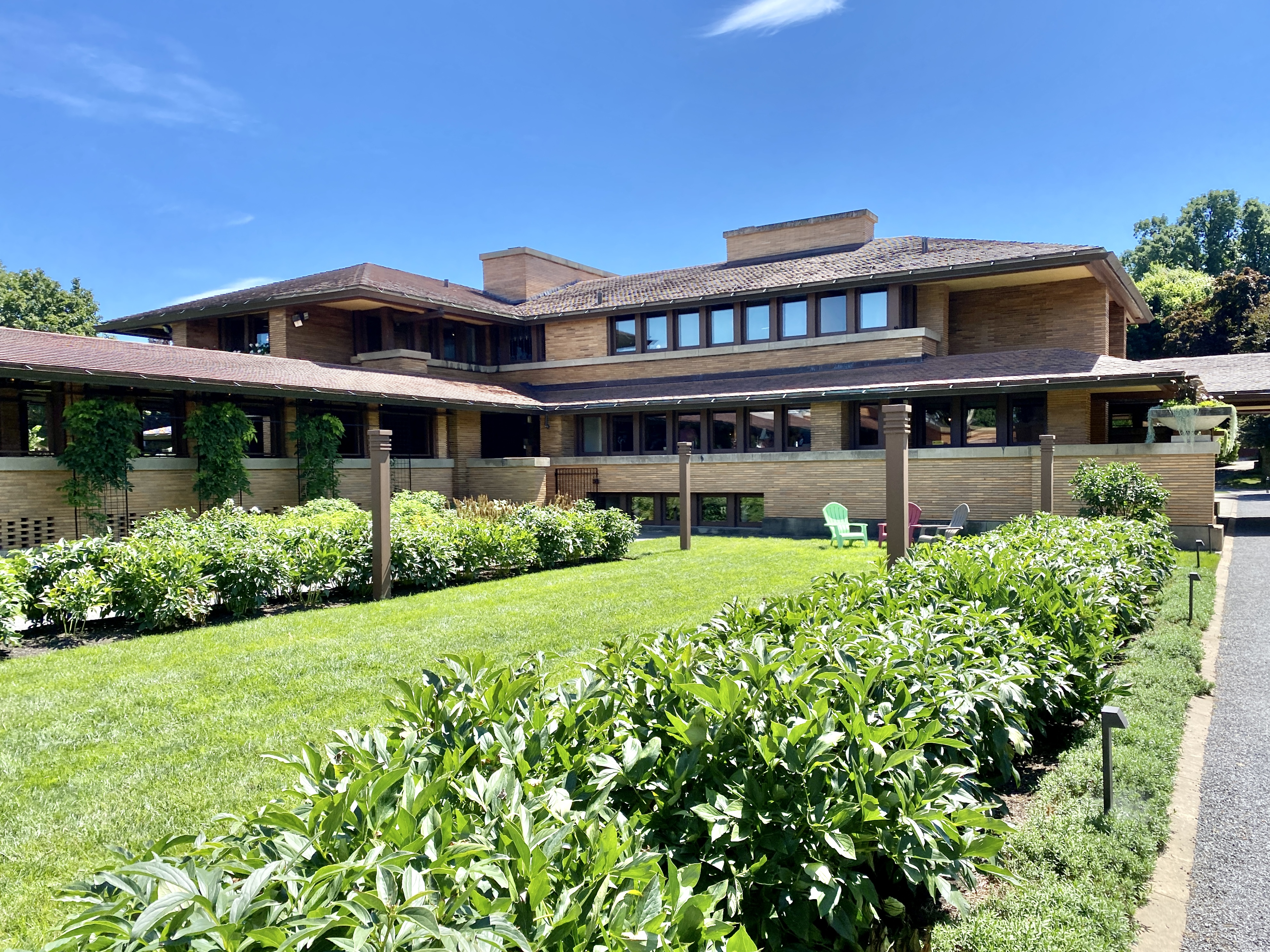
The garden north of the house; the pergola is to the left

The estate was envisioned as a family compound, with houses for Darwin and his sister Delta, as well as space where their siblings could potentially build extra houses if they wanted. Darwin wanted Wright to complete the Barton House first. The outcome determined whether Wright would receive the Martin House commission; writers retrospectively characterized the decision as a test of Darwin and Wright's relationship. The Barton House plan was based on Wright's earlier J. J. Walser Jr. House in Chicago, with several revisions that influenced the Martin estate's architecture. For example, Wright added a porch facing the Martins' future house, and he substituted the Walser House's woodwork and shingles for brick walls and tiled roofs. Work on the Barton House began in late 1903, and that house was ultimately completed a year later; its $12,000 final cost was thrice the original budget. (Note: Equivalent to $336,000 in 2025) Delta and George Barton leased their house from Martin.

Work on the stable began in May 1904, and construction of the main house began on June 20, 1904. The construction process was overseen by general contractor Oscar S. Lang, and over 60 subcontractors also provided material and labor. The project generally employed 50 or 65 laborers; they toiled 60 hours a week for $2 daily. (Note: Assuming 1904 dollars, equivalent to $72 in 2025) To alleviate Darwin's concerns over the delayed final plans, his brother William sent him some of Wright's preliminary sketches in mid-1904. Wright completed a revised plan for the complex in August, and the conservatory was nearing completion the next month. It had taken Wright 15 months to revise the plans for the main house's first floor. By the end of 1904, the house was under roof, and the interiors were being plastered.

Darwin generally gave Wright free rein over the architecture, furnishings, and landscape design, though Darwin involved himself extensively in the logistics of construction. Wright and Darwin sent each other hundreds of letters; they sent multiple letters on some days, discussing details as small as the placement of light fixtures. During the house's development, disagreements arose between Wright and Isabelle, especially since Wright's design largely neglected to account for Isabelle's needs. Lang and contractors sent hundreds more letters to each other, and Lang and Wright also discussed the design extensively. Lang also handled Darwin's demands, which were sometimes onerous. During the house's construction, Wright traveled to Japan in early 1905, leaving Griffin in charge of his projects. As such, some of Darwin's later correspondence was with Wright's associates, including Griffin, who traveled to Buffalo several times.

==== Completion ====
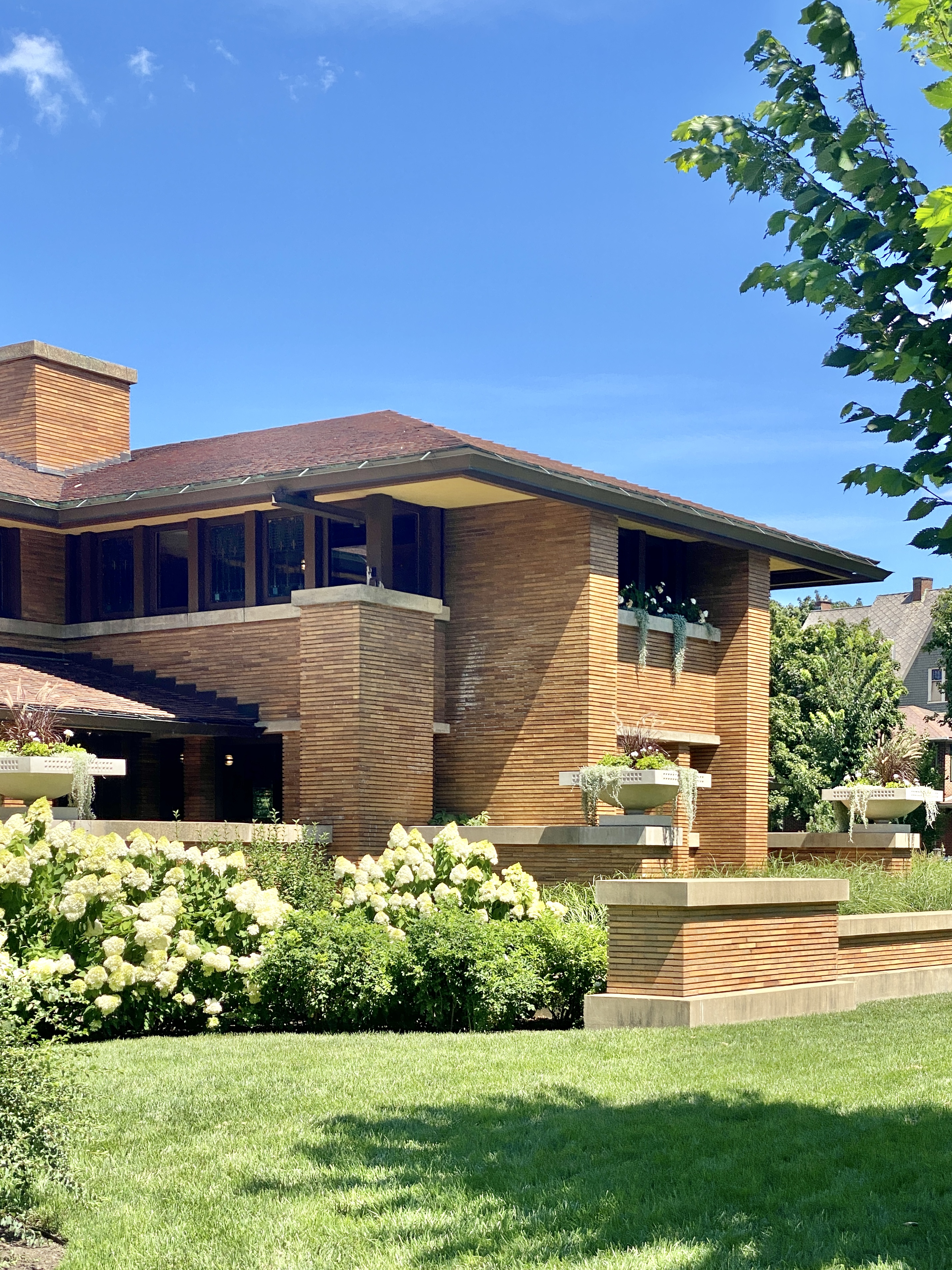
The southern elevation

A Buffalo Morning Express article from October 1904 had estimated that the house would be completed the following June. Work continued for 15 months past that deadline, as the involvement of dozens of contractors and manufacturers introduced additional complexity to the project. Darwin, disappointed with the small size of Wright's conservatory, had a 60 ft (18 m) long greenhouse constructed between the gardener's cottage and the carriage house. This greenhouse was not designed by Wright, and Darwin declined Wright's offer "to put a little architecture on it". Interior trim began to arrive in June 1905. By the end of that year, Lang's team was scaling down their involvement, and specialized artisans were placing final touches on the building. The Martin family moved in on November 20, 1905, after 17 months of work. Thomas Skinner, the first gardener to live on the estate, began working there in 1906.

Work on the furniture and finishes continued after the family moved in. The Martins hosted a formal reception at their house in November 1906, and Wright turned over the house to the Martins in 1907. This marked the completion of the five original buildings: the Martin and Barton houses, and the pergola, conservatory, and carriage house that connected them. Because Darwin had imposed no budget, Wright built a much larger and more detailed house than he normally would have. Wright also frequently changed the plans during construction, inflating costs; his office created several hundred drawings. The construction has been variously reported as costing Wright either $173,000, $175,000, or $300,000. (Note: Equivalent to $4.4–7.6 million in 2025) Darwin's house alone had amounted to $74,000. (Note: Equivalent to $1,864,000 in 2025) By comparison, the William E. Martin House had cost about $5,000, (Note: Equivalent to $126,000 in 2025) and the Ladies' Home Journal house design was estimated at $7,000. (Note: Equivalent to $176,000 in 2025) Gill said that the "long-drawn-out misadventure of the Darwin D. Martin house" contrasted with the relatively uneventful design process of his early William Martin and William R. Heath houses.

=== Martin usage ===
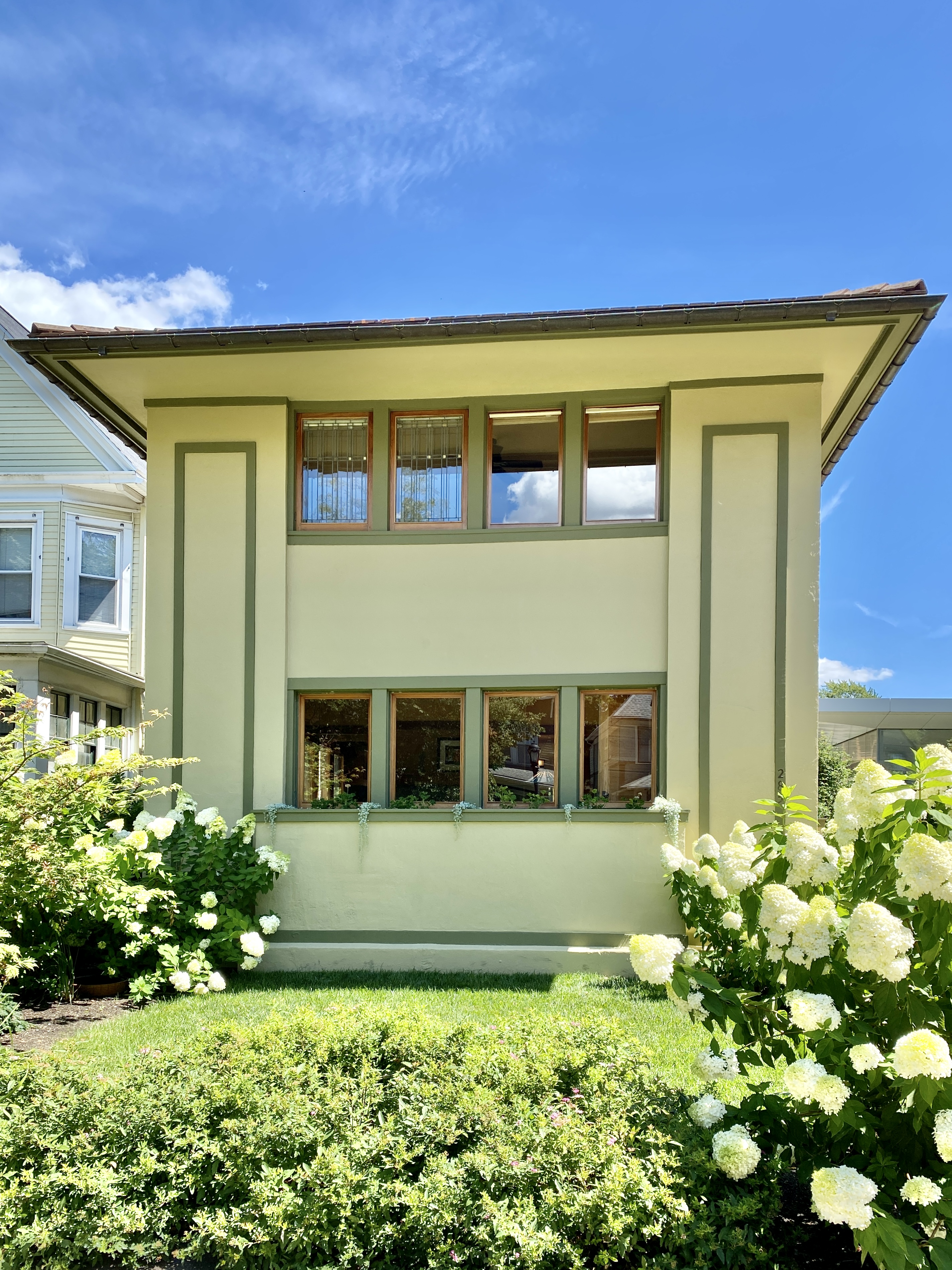
The gardener's cottage was built in 1909.

The Martins were one of several wealthy families to settle on Jewett Avenue in the 1900s. The house was not publicly accessible during the Martins' occupancy. The family bought a Steinway grand piano and a Victrola phonograph for the house, where they often performed music. Relatively little has been publicized about the Martins' lifestyle and the house's events. The family tended to keep to themselves and did not host large events. Darwin's diary indicates that he often invited the Bartons for meals and sometimes hosted parties and events for family, neighbors, friends, and colleagues. Isabelle, a member of several local social clubs, also hosted her fellow club members for events such as readings and music performances. Skinner had his wedding in the house's living room in 1907. Wright tweaked the furniture arrangements on successive house visits; the family once returned home to find that the architect had come in and moved their furniture around.

The Martins had several staff, including two maids; one of the maid's sons said the maids were "proud of their employment". The Martins' chauffeur, William Thorpe, lived in the carriage house for about four decades beginning in 1907, and Thorpe's nephew recalled that the Martins treated Thorpe and his wife as though they were family. Although Martin had asked Wright to draw up plans for a gardener's cottage in late 1905, the cottage was not built until 1909, having cost $4,500. (Note: Equivalent to $115,000 in 2025) Isabelle hired Cora Herrick in 1912 as a "companion" to care for her. After Skinner left the Martins' employ in 1915, he was replaced by George Fellows and Reuben Polder. The gardener provided fresh flowers daily for every room in the Martin House until Darwin's death.

Isabelle, who was nearly blind, did not appreciate the low amounts of light the interior received. Particularly as Isabelle's vision worsened, Darwin often read aloud to her. She also found the master bedroom uncomfortable and, within a few years of moving in, began sleeping in one of the guest bedrooms. Isabelle's objections to the design continued through the 1910s, prompting Darwin to ask Wright for several modifications to the design, including new skylights and a parlor. Darwin proposed a more drastic change in 1916—replacing the house's west end with a two-story wing for Isabelle—but he dropped the proposal that year. In 1920, without Wright's knowledge, the Martins carried out some of Darwin's proposed changes, relocating several walls outward. The relocated walls, designed by Wright associate Andrew Willatzen, provided more light to the sitting room, since the eaves no longer protruded deeply from the relocated walls. The Martins' son Darwin R. also disliked the design, calling it dark and bizarre.

After George Barton died in 1929, the Martins considered moving out, and Darwin asked Wright to suggest alternative uses for the building, to which Wright declined. The family lost their fortune during the Great Depression. Martin was worth $2.5 million in 1929, (Note: Equivalent to $36.9 million in 2025) but five years later he had to borrow money from Thorpe, his chauffeur. When Martin died in 1935, Wright owed him $70,000; (Note: Equivalent to $1,292,000 in 2025) Secrest wrote that Martin had calculated Wright's unpaid debt as precisely $37,976.29. (Note: Equivalent to $701,000 in 2025)

==== Influence of Martin's friendship with Wright ====
Darwin and Wright stayed friends after the house was completed, although they communicated far less frequently than they had during the house's construction. The Martins provided financial assistance and other support to Wright throughout his career. Over his lifetime, Wright drew 40 building plans for the Martins, of which fewer than half were constructed. (Note: Sources disagree on whether 11 or 15 were constructed. Brendan Gill writes that nine major buildings were constructed for the Martins, including the Martin, Barton, and gardener's house at the Martin estate, but excluding the pergola, conservatory, or carriage house.) These included the Larkin Administration Building, as well as the E-Z Polish Factory in Chicago, Illinois. In 1927, with Isabelle unwilling to travel long distances, Wright designed the Graycliff summer estate overlooking Lake Erie in Derby, New York. Some of Wright's projects for Martin were not built during either man's lifetime, such as a school, a gas station, and a house for the Martin's daughter Dorothy. The Blue Sky Mausoleum, which Wright originally designed for the Martin family, was eventually built at the Forest Lawn Cemetery in 2004.

Wright historians Meryle Secrest and Jack Quinan theorize that Martin may have seen Wright as a confidant. The two men were also similar in age, with similar backgrounds. Quinan wrote that Wright may have liked Darwin's willingness to take his advice, and Mary Roberts, later a director of the Martin House, said Wright's charisma and his organic architecture beliefs had appealed to Darwin. A writer for The New Criterion retrospectively said that the friendship thrived in spite of the Martin House's problems, contrasting with Wright's strained relations with two other clients—Susan Lawrence Dana and Aline Barnsdall, the respective owners of the Dana–Thomas and Hollyhock houses. Wright's friendship with Darwin influenced the care he had given the design. By contrast, Wright considered William Martin's house "the worst [he] ever designed", and the architect designed a two-story house with five terraced levels for Darwin's handicapped colleague Walter V. Davidson; neither man had such a good relationship with Wright.

=== Mid-20th century ===
When Darwin died, Wright's associate Edgar Tafel said the house remained essentially as Wright had built it; however, this did not last long. By 1937 the estate had already begun to deteriorate, the walls at the front of the house were crumbling, and the conservatory had not been used for several years due to a leak in the heating system. Isabelle lived in the house briefly after her husband's death but found herself unable to afford the taxes, deciding instead to move into an apartment building her son developed. She moved out in 1937 or 1938. Martin's son, Darwin R. Martin, had attempted to donate the house to the city of Buffalo or the State University of New York (SUNY) to be used as a library, but both offers were rejected. Instead, the younger Darwin gave away some of the furniture.

Over the next two decades, the house was vacant, and as the building began to deteriorate, people roller-skated through the house. Tiles from the living room's fireplace fell off. Thieves also stole what they could. The skylight leaked and, by one account, snowdrifts measuring several feet high would accumulate in the living room. Historian Henry-Russell Hitchcock wrote in 1942 that the interiors "have become rather dreary" because of the overgrown grounds and that only the kitchen retained its former glory. In 1946 the city took control over the property in a tax foreclosure sale to pay off $75,000 in unpaid taxes. (Note: Equivalent to $943,000 in 2025) The Barton House, which was still occupied, remained in separate ownership. Patrick C. Dwyer had purchased the house from the city by 1949, announcing plans to replace it with apartments, but he later canceled these plans. The Martin estate was purchased in 1951 by the Roman Catholic Diocese of Buffalo, with plans to turn the estate into a summer retreat for their priests, but it remained empty.

The Martin estate was purchased in 1953, 1954, or 1955 by architect Sebastian Tauriello, thus saving the house from demolition. Tauriello conducted some repairs to bring it back to usable condition, and the main house was converted into three apartment units. Tauriello sold the deteriorated carriage house, conservatory, and pergola. These three structures were subsequently demolished, probably in 1962. They were replaced with three apartment buildings, which contained 20 apartments between them. The apartment structures, made of beige brick, each measured two stories high and were widely criticized by preservationists. By 1966, Tauriello's widow lived in half of the house, while the other two apartments occupying the other half were rented out.

=== University at Buffalo ownership ===
==== 1960s to 1980s ====
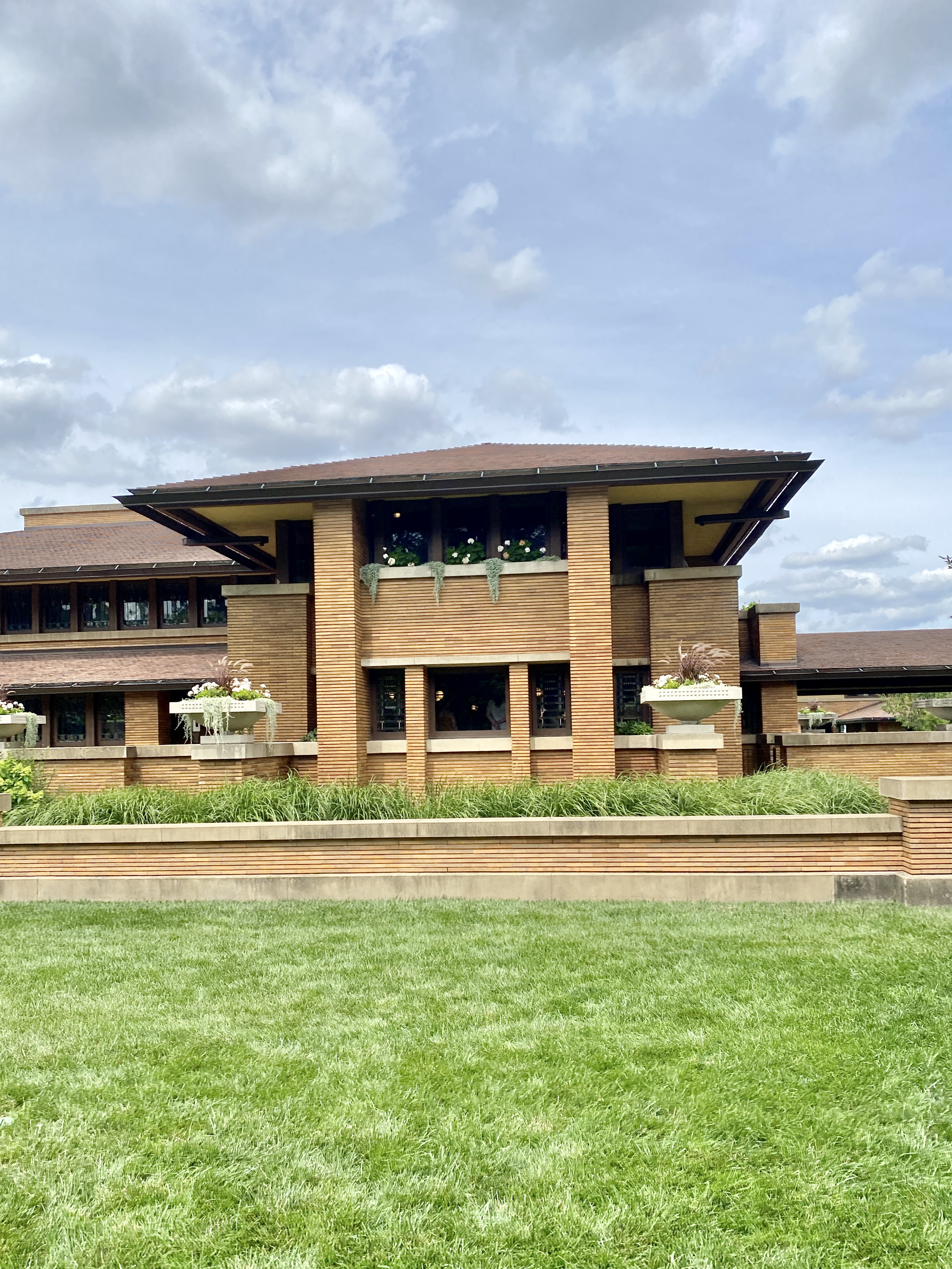
The house's southern elevation

In 1967, SUNY's University at Buffalo (UB) purchased the Martin estate for $60,100. (Note: Equivalent to $442,000 in 2025) By then, all the furniture had been removed, as had a mural, a ceramic floor, many gold-leaf decorations, and some windows. Tafel restored both the Martin and Barton houses; at the Martin House, he added oak bookshelves and honey-tinted oak floors. UB president Martin Meyerson and his wife Margy reacquired some of the original furnishings, such as a clock and chairs. The kitchen was renovated in a style reminiscent of a modern ranch house. The renovation cost the New York government $27,681. (Note: Equivalent to $204,000 in 2025) Due to funding shortfalls, some issues, such as the sagging roof, were not rectified. After the restoration, the Martin House again became a single-family residence, housing the university president, while the Barton House was given to UB's provost. The university continued subdividing the estate, selling the Barton House in 1967. By the late 1960s, Margy recalled that the Meyerson family received several visitors a week.

Meyerson was succeeded in 1970 by Robert L. Ketter, whose wife added plants and repaired tapestries and furniture. The Ketters began allowing various university groups to use the house, and as such the building hosted UB's university archives and alumni offices. UB's restoration was limited to slight modernizations and the reacquisition of several pieces of original furniture. UB received six Wright-designed chairs from a local family in the 1970s, contingent on the chairs permanently remaining in the house, but Ketter later sold the chairs. Some of the original design details were modified substantially; for example, cove lighting was added to the ceiling, and one of the fireplace's openings was sealed. The house was rededicated in April 1976. UB could not afford to maintain the Martin House, which was in such poor condition that the front porch collapsed in April 1979. Annual maintenance cost $15,000–20,000, (Note: Equivalent to $54,000–89,000 in 2025) but roof repairs alone cost tens of thousands of dollars more. That October, SUNY's trustees authorized UB to find a new tenant for the house. An architectural group proposed using it as a museum, while UB planned to convert the house into a Canadian studies institute.

The Center for Canadian-American Studies opened in the house on June 5, 1981, and the Buffalo Foundation gave a $5,000 grant for restoration that year. (Note: Equivalent to $15,000 in 2025) Some of the original decorations, such as art-glass windows and barrel chairs, remained. The School of Architecture and Environmental Design moved into the house in 1982. Afterward, the School of Architecture began renovating the house with private funds, and UB repaired the exterior. UB also hired a curator to oversee the house, which was open for tours during the decade. The university sold the gardener's cottage in 1984; it was eventually acquired by Gregory Kingsman, who renovated it and built a Wright-inspired annex. The cost of restoring the main house was estimated at $3 million by then, (Note: Equivalent to $7.5 million in 2025) and The Buffalo News wrote that the house needed $1 million just for structural repairs. (Note: Equivalent to $2.3 million in 2025) In 1989, pizza magnate Tom Monaghan provided a $25,000 grant for emergency repairs on the second floor. (Note: Equivalent to $56,000 in 2025) The house was in such poor shape that Carolyn Pitts, a federal government historian, suggested that the building's National Historic Landmark designation (granted in 1986) could be withdrawn if deterioration continued.

==== Early 1990s: State takeover offer ====
UB's advisory board suggested in 1989 that the New York State Office of Parks, Recreation and Historic Preservation (OPRHP) take over the house's operation and maintenance, as the university could not afford it. The OPRHP offered to acquire, restore, and operate the Martin estate as a New York state park. The takeover depended on whether enough funds could be raised for the house's restoration, the cost of which had increased to $6 million by 1990. (Note: Equivalent to $14.9 million in 2025) At the time, the house had some water damage and needed gutter, floor, and roof repairs. Preservationists were discussing which issues to address first, along with the feasibility of using parts of the house as backroom space for the museum. UB also hired architect Wilbert Hasbrouck to devise a restoration program for the house. The OPRHP's takeover was to be funded by the 1990 New York Environmental Quality Bond Act, which voters rejected. Repairs to the house were delayed as a result. That December, a Wright-designed chair was stolen from the house, prompting a temporary closure; the house remained closed until mid-1993, and the chair remained missing.

After an unannounced visit by US Senator Daniel Patrick Moynihan in March 1991, he expressed displeasure at its dilapidated state and promised to seek $4.5 million in federal funding. (Note: Equivalent to $9.5 million in 2025) M&T Bank offered to lend $100,000 for the house's restoration that year, so long as a preservation plan was created and additional funds were raised. (Note: Equivalent to $210,000 in 2025) Afterward, the Landmark Society of the Niagara Frontier launched a $1.5 million fundraising campaign; (Note: Equivalent to $3.2 million in 2025) the society wanted to take over the house for itself. The separate Preservation Coalition of Erie County wanted the New York government to take over, and a taskforce of the Niagara Frontier group directly petitioned Governor Mario Cuomo to save the house, citing its potential for tourism. Local groups criticized UB for letting the house fall into disrepair.

=== Renovations and MHRC usage ===
==== 1990s ====
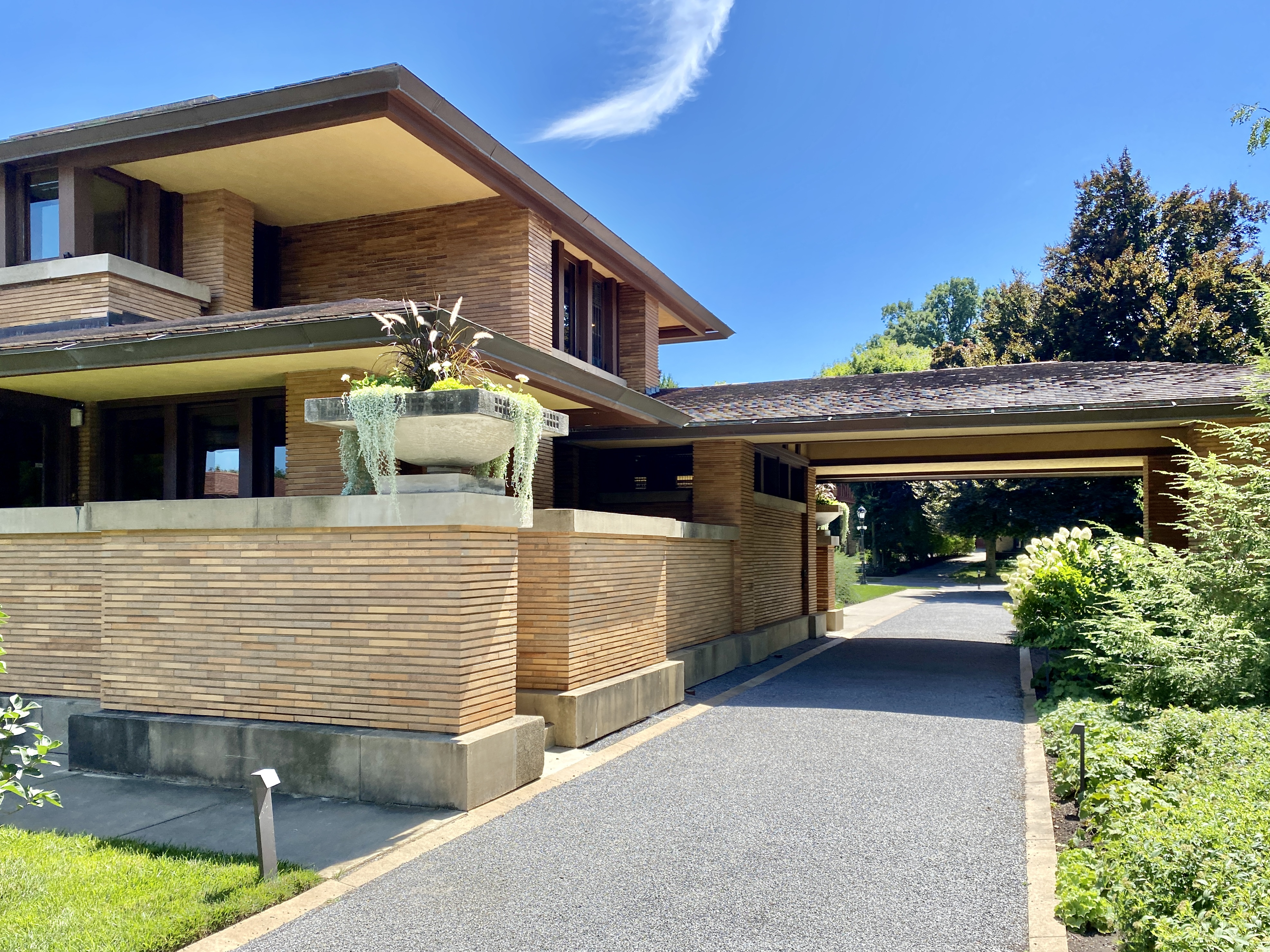
The house as seen from its western elevation, looking south toward porte-cochère

In mid-1993, the state government, UB, and the nonprofit Martin House Restoration Corporation (MHRC) agreed to have the state take over the estate after restoration was completed. Thereafter, the three parties shared responsibility for the house. At a conference that year, Wright scholars favored restoring the Martin House to its 1907 appearance. These scholars rejected the retention of later additions, such as Isabelle's relocated walls or the apartments' foundations. The renovation was split into three phases—emergency exterior repairs, other exterior fixes, and interior renovations—and the project's proponents hoped it would attract visitors. The renovation spurred efforts by the MHRC to rebuild the three demolished structures, which indirectly led to the construction of previously unbuilt Wright designs. Hamilton Houston Lownie Architects (HHLA) was the complex's renovation architect, and the Giannada Construction Company was the construction contractor.

The house temporarily reopened for tours between July and September 1993, after which it closed for the first phase of renovations, costing $1.1 million. (Note: Equivalent to $9.5 million in 2025) Buffalo News publisher Stanford Lipsey, upon learning of the house's condition, partnered with M&T and Rich Products to finance the renovation. The three groups collectively donated $350,000 to purchase the Barton House in 1994, (Note: Equivalent to $689,000 in 2025) and they also purchased the apartment buildings for $700,000 and donated them to the MHRC. (Note: Equivalent to $1.4 million in 2025) That year, the Getty Foundation provided a $91,000 (Note: Equivalent to $179,000 in 2025) matching grant for conservation of the house's decorations, contingent on another $182,000 being raised. (Note: Equivalent to $358,000 in 2025) At the time, the budget was $1.276 million, (Note: Equivalent to $2.510 million in 2025) but the state failed to provide a $1 million allocation for the house in its 1995 state budget. (Note: Equivalent to $1.967 million in 2025) M&T chairman Robert G. Wilmers also provided a matching grant for the project.

Work on the Martin House began in 1995, and the MHRC hired its first executive director that year. HHLA repaired the floor slabs, raised the basement to make way for mechanical equipment, replaced interior fittings, and removed asbestos-laden magnesite decorations. To expedite the restoration process, the New York state government conducted a cursory environmental review; the state was forced to conduct a fuller review following a lawsuit from local residents. The state provided $1.5 million for the house in 1997, (Note: Equivalent to $2.8 million in 2025) and the MHRC received additional grants that year from the state government, the federal government, and the Margaret L. Wendt Foundation. By that year, the renovation of the entire complex was planned to cost $23 million; (Note: Equivalent to $42.8 million in 2025) the MHRC wished to complete the first phase in advance of a planned Frank Lloyd Wright Building Conservancy conference at the house in 1998. A roof replacement was completed that year; at the time, only one of the original roof tiles remained. A kiln in Pontigny, France, manufactured replacement tiles, and restorers spent three years replicating the original tiles' patinas.

==== 2000s ====
In 2000, Erie County's government allocated $2.5 million in the county budget for a new visitor center; by then, the estate had 6,000 annual visitors. The 1960s apartment buildings on the site were to be demolished to make way for replicas of the original pergola, conservatory, and carriage house. The John R. Oishei Foundation donated $2 million for the visitor center in February 2001, and work on clearing the first two apartment buildings began that October. The MHRC also announced plans to stabilize the foundation, renovate a neighboring property at 143 Jewett Parkway for offices, and conduct archeological studies of the pergola and conservatory sites. HHLA designed replicas of the three demolished structures based on 70 drawings in Wright's archives, a difficult task because of the original plans' paucity of details. In 2002, title to the Martin House was transferred from UB to the MHRC, and the architect Toshiko Mori won a design competition for the new visitor center. The new visitor center was originally planned to be complete in 2005. The MHRC also obtained land for a replica of the carriage house.

The house remained open during the project, and approximately 9,000 annual visitors received close-up tours of the renovation. By 2003 the MHRC had raised over $23 million. That year, workers began constructing a geothermal climate-control system, requiring the demolition of flower beds around the house. The house's operators also collaborated with the operators of other Buffalo tourist attractions to increase visitation. The state provided $240,000 in 2005 to rebuild the carriage house. Workers had patched the masonry by then; the MHRC had obtained Roman brick from the Belden Brick Company in Ohio, which was hired following an eight-year search. (Note: Some sources state that replicating the bricks took six years.) Following a donation from volunteer Judy Kieffer, restorers rebuilt the conservatory's original Nike of Samothrace statue using the original molds. In 2006, the gardener's cottage was repurchased, and the final apartment building was demolished to make way for the visitor center. Plans for a conservatory were announced that year, funded by a $100,000 donation from Lipsey. The MHRC had 350 volunteers and a shop in the Barton House, and the renovation budget had been revised upward to $35 million. (Note: The $35 million amount is sometimes cited as the cost of the three reconstructed structures.)

The rebuilt carriage house, conservatory, and pergola were completed in either 2006 or 2007. The house was rededicated on October 4, 2006. The Nike statue was rededicated in June 2007, and the gardener's cottage opened for tours that August. A third phase of construction began that year and involved restoring the exterior walls, veranda, and first-floor fireplace to their original positions. Meanwhile, the visitor center remained delayed while plans were revised. In 2008, a replica of Richard Bock's sculpture Spring was created, and the inventor Wilson Greatbatch and his wife Eleanor donated $2.5 million for the visitor pavilion's construction. The visitor pavilion opened on March 12, 2009. By then, the project was about three-fourths complete, and the cost of renovation had increased to $50 million. The state government provided a $3 million grant that July, but fundraising lagged amid the 2008 financial crisis. The house received 3,500 visitors annually and was not as well known as other Wright designs such as Fallingwater.

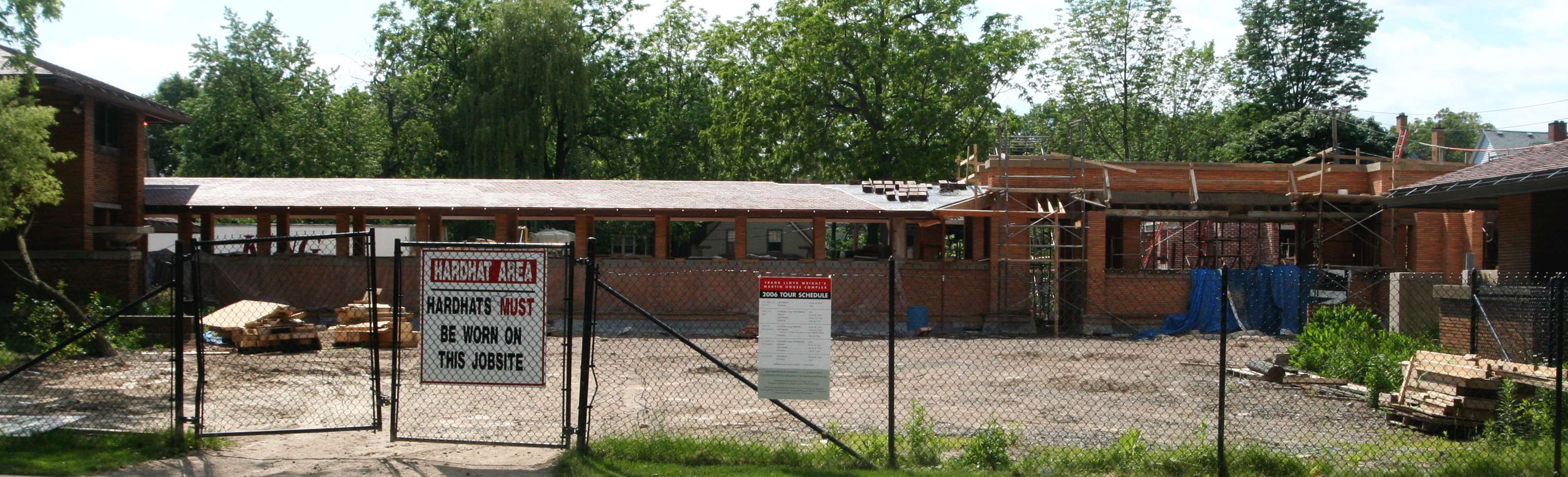
Pergola being reconstructed in 2006

==== 2010s to present ====
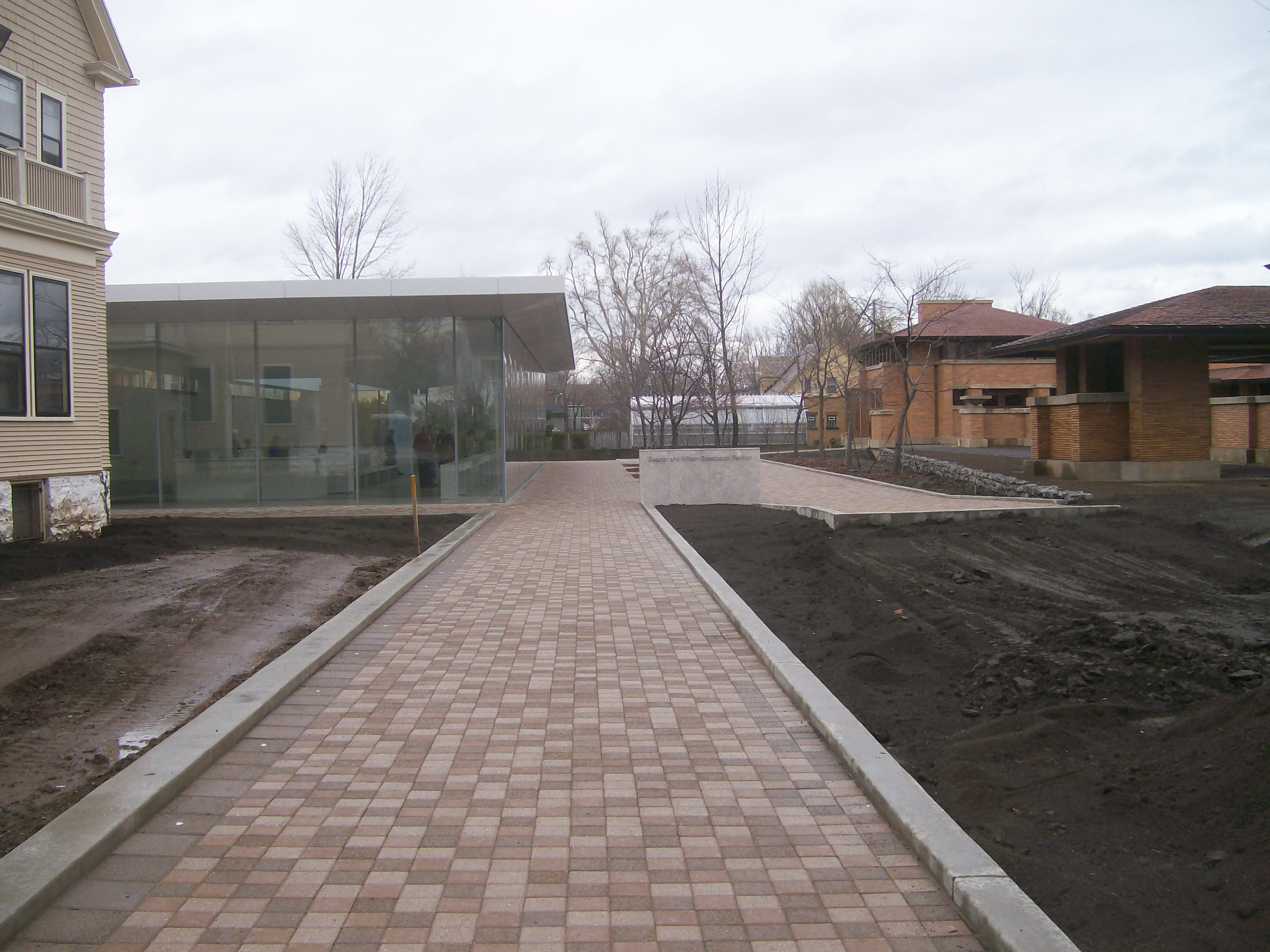
Entrance to the new Visitor Center (background left) and the Martin House Complex (right)

After the new and rebuilt structures opened, about $11 million of work remained, including an interior restoration, along with landscape, art-glass, and furniture repairs. The building continued to host tours while renovations went on. The final phase of construction began in 2010 and was split into a mechanical upgrade and an interior upgrade. Workers removed several thousand pieces of woodwork in 2011 and carefully restored the wood over the next several years. Work on a $1 million landscape restoration was announced in 2015 after that project received a donation and governmental funding. The MHRC installed a new security system in 2016 to replace three older, disconnected alarm systems, which were triggering frequent false alarms. The mechanical upgrade also included new HVAC, fire-safety, plumbing, heating, and communications systems. That year, workers finished restoring the first-floor woodwork, and they began recoloring the first-floor interiors to their original hue. Workers began renovating the second floor's woodwork as well.

By the late 2010s, the house received 30,000 annual visitors, less than other Wright-designed buildings. Workers were restoring furniture, artworks, and glass panes, and recreating the decorative details. Botti Studio and HHLA restored the wisteria mosaic fireplace; the manufacturer of the fireplace's original glass facing was no longer in business, so restorers hired a competing firm to recreate that decorative detail. Pieces of the original foundation were reused in a perimeter wall. The mosaic fireplace was rededicated in June 2017, though the grounds remained yet to be finished. The MHRC renovated the Barton House in 2018, and that building was closed for 12 months. The project's final phase involved restoring the grounds, which began in May 2018 and entailed restoring the floricycle, adding trees along the street frontages, and adding plantings. The landscape work was carried out by Bayer Landscape Architecture and completed in July 2019. In total, renovation of the Martin House complex had cost $50 million or $52 million in total. About half of the cost, $24 million, was funded by the state government, while Erie County funded another $4.6 million. The MHRC began raising $5 million for an endowment fund that year.

When the restoration was completed, the house averaged 40,000 annual visitors; it had received a record-high 42,000 visitors in 2019. The estate was temporarily closed to visitors in 2020 due to the COVID-19 pandemic in New York. This closure, occurring less than a year after the restoration's completion, resulted in a 25% decrease in the house's revenue. The second floor was opened for the first time when guided tours resumed in July 2021, but visitation from Canadians—which made up about 15% of the house's pre-pandemic clientele—continued to lag. Several of the original windows were reinstalled in 2022. International visitation to the Martin House, particularly from Canadians, declined from 2025 onward, amid strained international relations caused by U.S. President Donald Trump's threats to annex Canada. The decline in tourism negatively impacted the house's finances.

== Architecture ==
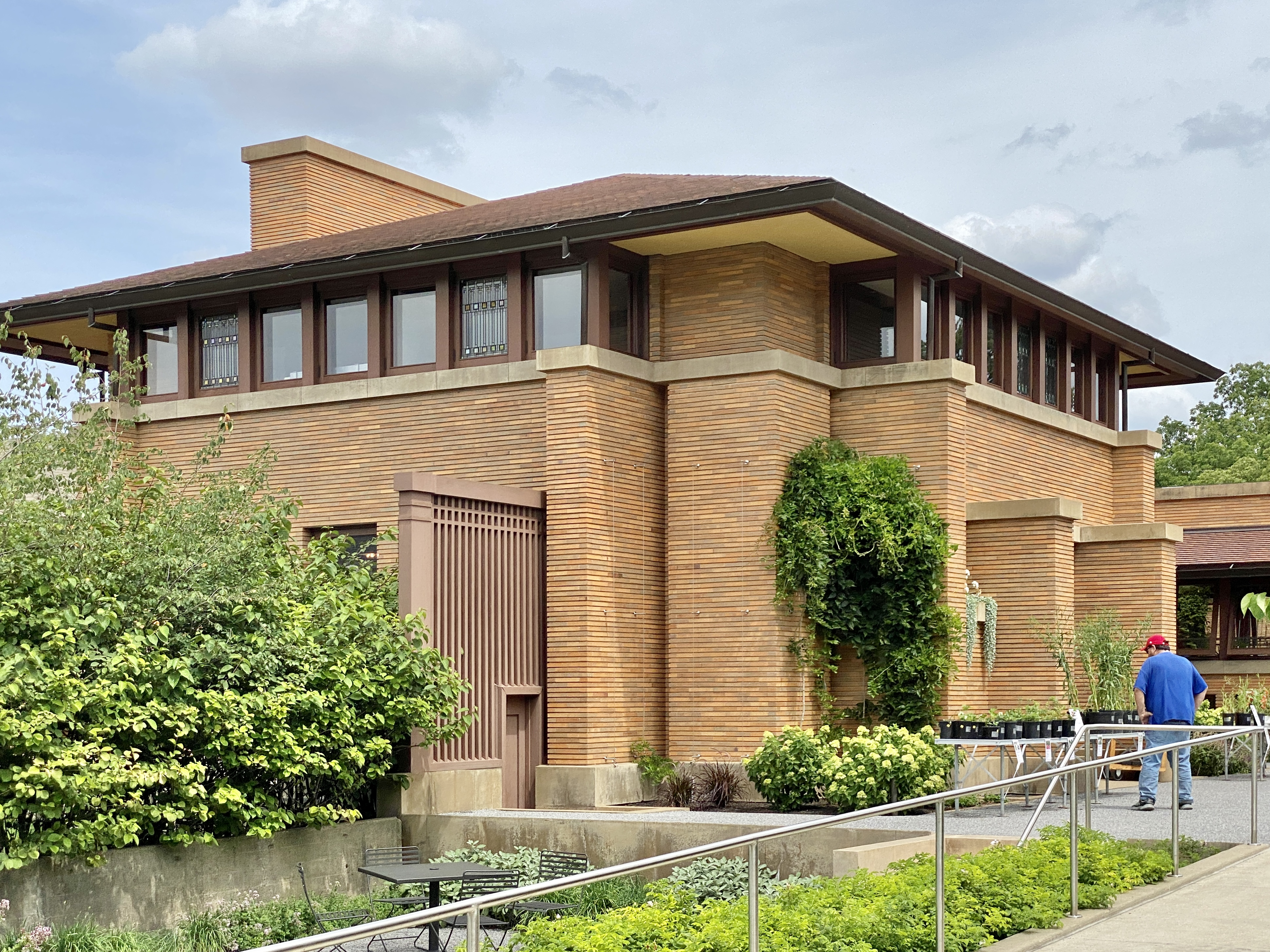
Decorations such as Roman brick, concrete trim, and red roof tiles were used consistently throughout the estate (carriage house pictured).

The estate contains six structures designed by Frank Lloyd Wright: (Note: Some sources cite the complex as having had five buildings, excluding the pergola.) the main Martin residence, a long pergola, a conservatory, a carriage house, a gardener's cottage, and the smaller George Barton House. The "Martin House" name is sometimes used to refer to all six of these structures as a group. These structures collectively have about 30,000 square feet (2,800 m^{2}) or 32,000 square feet (3,000 m^{2}) of space. Three buildings—the carriage house, conservatory, and pergola—were demolished in 1962 and rebuilt in the 2000s renovation. The reconstructed buildings may be the first demolished Wright designs rebuilt at their original site. The Martin estate is among several Buffalo-area structures designed by Wright, along with the William R. Heath House, the Walter V. Davidson House, Graycliff, and the Blue Sky Mausoleum. These structures have been cited as the largest concentration of Wright's work in a single American city other than Chicago.

All of the buildings were designed in the Prairie style. The estate's construction involved "nearly every construction material then known to man", as historian Jack Quinan described it. Decorations such as Roman brick, concrete trim, and red roof tiles were used. Other materials included steel, wood, rubblestone, copper, plaster, and several types of floor finishes. The buildings collectively had 450 art glass windows designed by Wright, with unique patterns for each structure (including several patterns for the main house). Several design details in the house were also shared with the Larkin Building. For example, the two buildings had construction materials in common, and both structures had conservatories, Nike of Samothrace statues, light shafts, and large piers. Quinan wrote that Wright had intended for these details to relate Martin's home and work lives. Wright stated that his primary objective was "to reduce the number of necessary parts of the house and the separate rooms to a minimum, and make all come together as an enclosed space—so divided that light, air and vista permeated the whole with a sense of unity".

The architecture was also intended to tie in with the landscape. Wright did this by using design details such as walkways, pergolas, and terraces, along with Prairie-style features such as cantilevered forms and overlapping, protruding roofs. The estate has low massings, rising no more than 32 feet (9.8 m) . In contrast to the curving street grid, the estate's buildings are largely right-angled, with cruciform ground plans. The buildings sit on two perpendicular axes, which converge at the conservatory and extend south to the pergola and main house, west to the carriage house, and east to the Barton House.

=== Main house ===
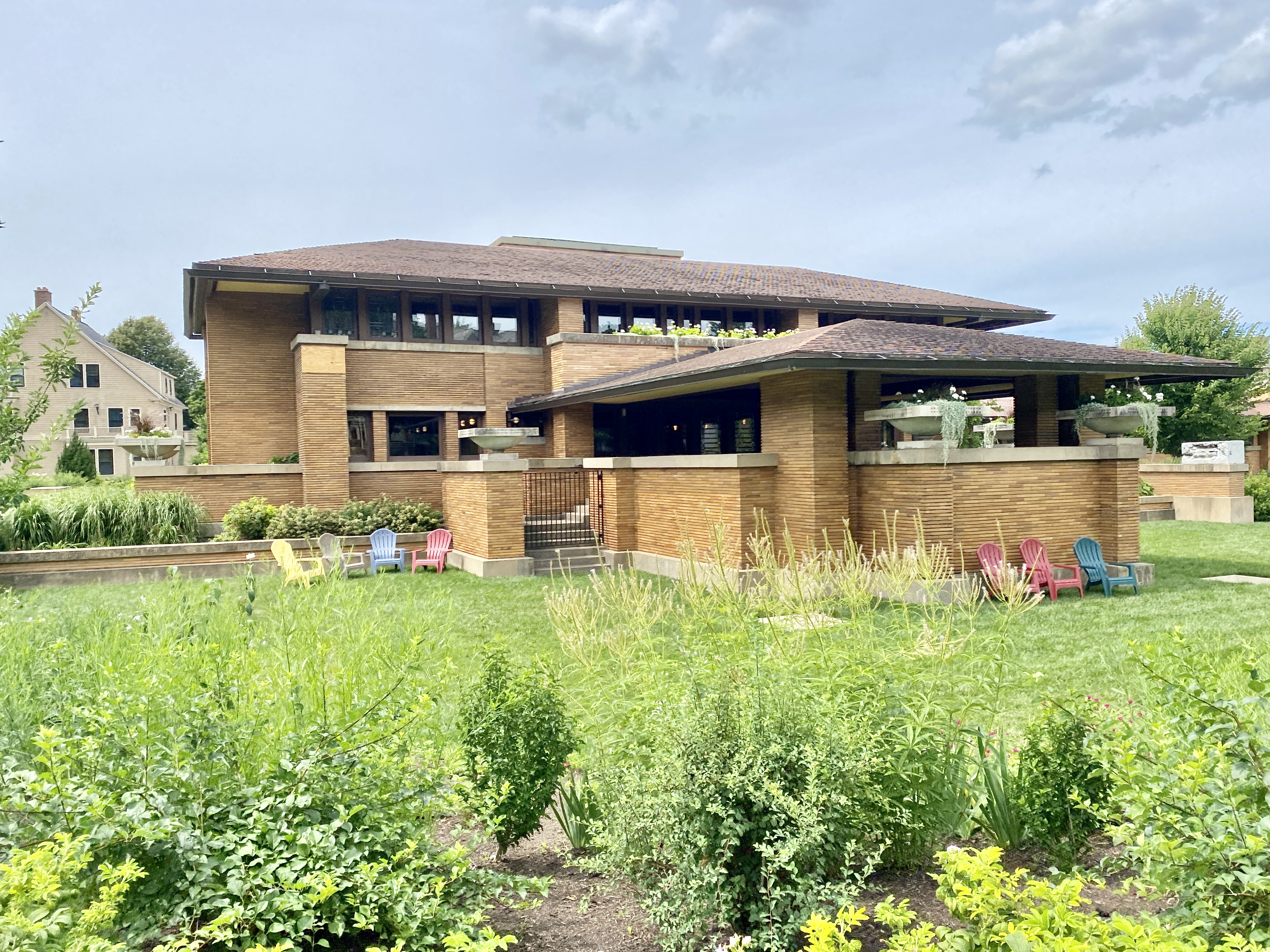
The house seen from the east, with pergola at center-right

The main house, used by Darwin and Isabelle Martin, is at the south end of the estate, at 125 Jewett Parkway. The house occupies two lots and is variously cited as measuring 150 by 72 feet (46 by 22 m) or 155 by 88 feet (47 by 27 m) across. Unlike later structures like Fallingwater, Wright had minimal involvement in the design process, delegating the details to apprentices. The design was inspired by Home in a Prairie Town, a plan that Wright had submitted to Ladies' Home Journal in February 1901. That plan, part of a design competition for a livable house organized by Edward Bok, included details that became characteristic of the Prairie style, such as horizontally-oriented design details, hip roofs, and central fireplaces. The house bears great similarities to Wright's Ladies' Home Journal design; the facades are almost identical, and the Martin House repeats most of the Journal house's ground floor. In contrast to his other Prairie style houses, the Martin House is unusually large and has an open plan layout. The design details were also intended to provide privacy.

Many of the original windows and some furnishings have long since been dispersed, having been removed for safekeeping or as keepsakes. Some of the house's original windows are displayed in museums around the world, including the Charles Hosmer Morse Museum of American Art, Museum of Modern Art, and Los Angeles County Museum of Art. Other windows have ended up in private collections. One of the art-glass doors was sold for $110,000 in 1983, (Note: Equivalent to $298,000 in 2025) then a record for any Wright-designed decoration. Some of the original decorations have been recovered from the 1990s onward, having been returned from as far away as Scotland and Australia. In New York, former owners of Martin House decorations have included Albright-Knox Art Gallery, the Grey Art Gallery, and printing executive William Clarkson. Other notable previous owners have included philanthropist Tom Monaghan, computer magnate Max Palevsky, and the University of Victoria. Acquiring all the original decorations was infeasible due to high costs, so some details have been replicated.

==== Exterior ====
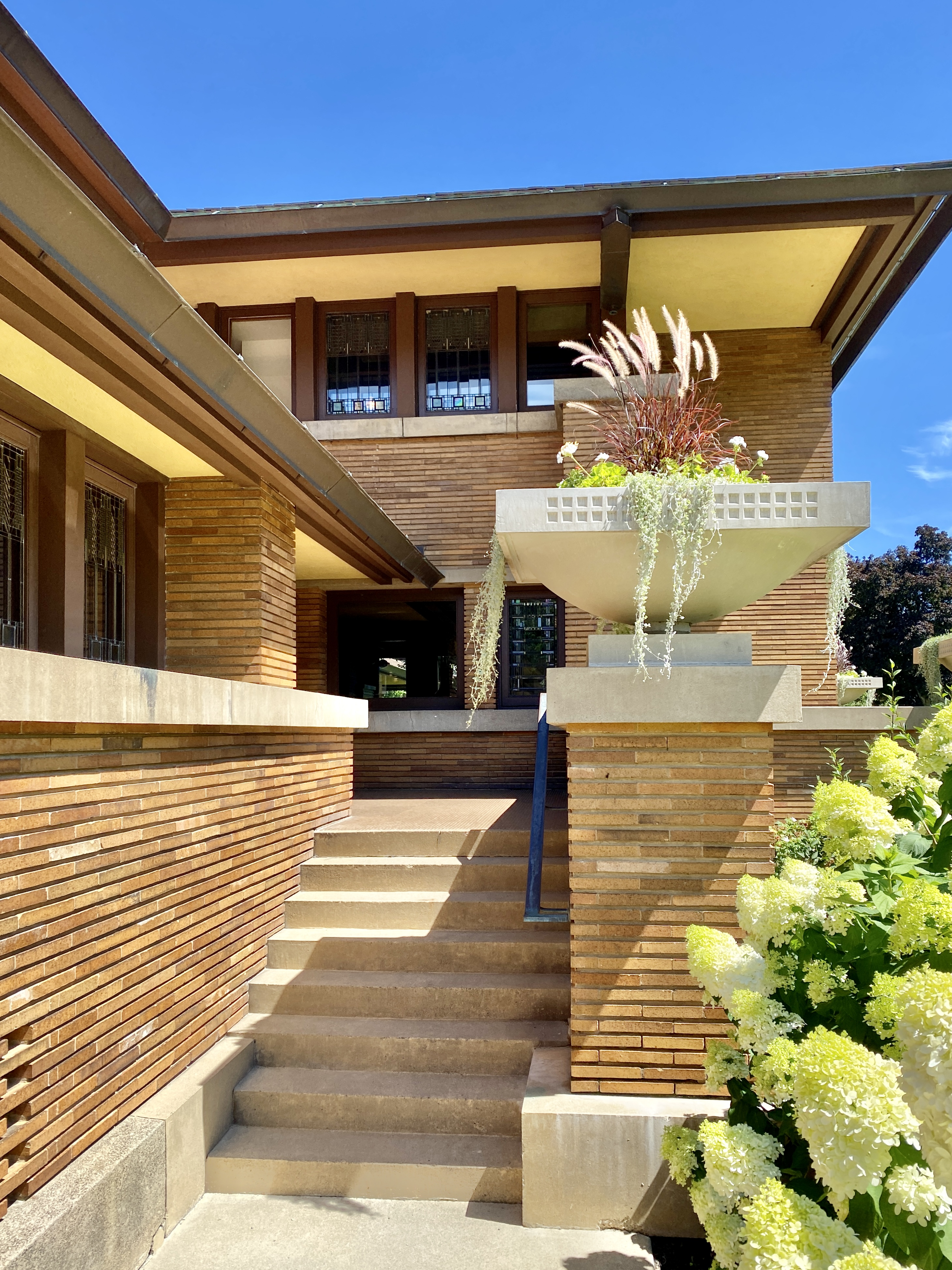
The main entrance is concealed behind brick piers with urns atop them.

The Martin House is two stories high with a basement. It has a cruciform ground-floor plan with longer east–west and shorter north–south axes. The house's central section has vertically-oriented design details and is taller than the wings, which are oriented horizontally. The exterior walls are not load-bearing walls, as the roof is instead supported by groupings of piers inside. The stone foundation protrudes from the facade, above which the house is clad in brick laid in common bond. The foundation has sun traps, a series of glass plates that reflect sunlight into the basement. The brick is variously cited as having an orange, tan-orange, or yellow-brown hue. Just beneath the roofline are bands of windows with brick mullions between them. The house has painted wooden trim, stone windowsills and lintels, and concrete copings. The exterior woodwork was originally painted dark green.

The facade originally had hundreds of art glass windows, (Note: The house is variously cited as having 260, 362, or 394 art glass windows.) which Wright referred to as "light screens". Made by the Linden Glass Company, the light screens are designed as casement windows rather than as sliding sash windows, since Wright considered the latter "a guillotine, not fit for humans". The windows are more detailed than similar windows he created for the Coonley, Dana–Thomas, and Robie houses. Each window has up to 750 shards in various polygonal shapes. The pieces are arranged in 11 patterns, separated by zinc and copper came strips. The thicknesses of the glass panes tapered to as little as 1/4 inch (6.4 mm) at their periphery. Some windows on the second floor depict a "tree of life", a popular Arts and Crafts motif at a time where many Arts and Crafts buildings were being developed in Buffalo. Other light screens (particularly on the first floor) include wisteria patterns. Pittsburgh Plate Glass also manufactured clear panes for the house. The windows on the first floor have been sold off over the years, though some of these windows have been reacquired or replicated. The windows on the second floor remain intact.

At the western end of the house is the porte-cochère, which protrudes above the main driveway near the southern end of the house's east–west axis. A short stoop ascends to a passageway leading to the front door. The stoop is concealed behind brick piers with urns atop them, giving the appearance of no front door. At the eastern end of the house is the veranda, also described as a covered terrace or porch. The veranda has a large hip roof above it, supported by two piers at the narrowest portion of the space. The corners of the house also have piers. At either end of the north–south axis, the northern and southern elevations contain three pairs of piers, each in different sizes and shapes.

The house has roofs on several levels, which are cantilevered outward from the facades and overlap each other. The roofs have wood frames and are supported by I-beams and pillars. The eaves protrude up to 5.5 feet (1.7 m), sheltering walkways underneath them. The soffits of the eaves were originally a mustard gold. At the eaves' edges are sloped gutters, concealed within flat gutters. The eaves originally sagged because not all of the roof's support beams were connected to each other, but this was fixed in the 1990s. Protruding from the roof are two wide chimneys.

==== Interior ====
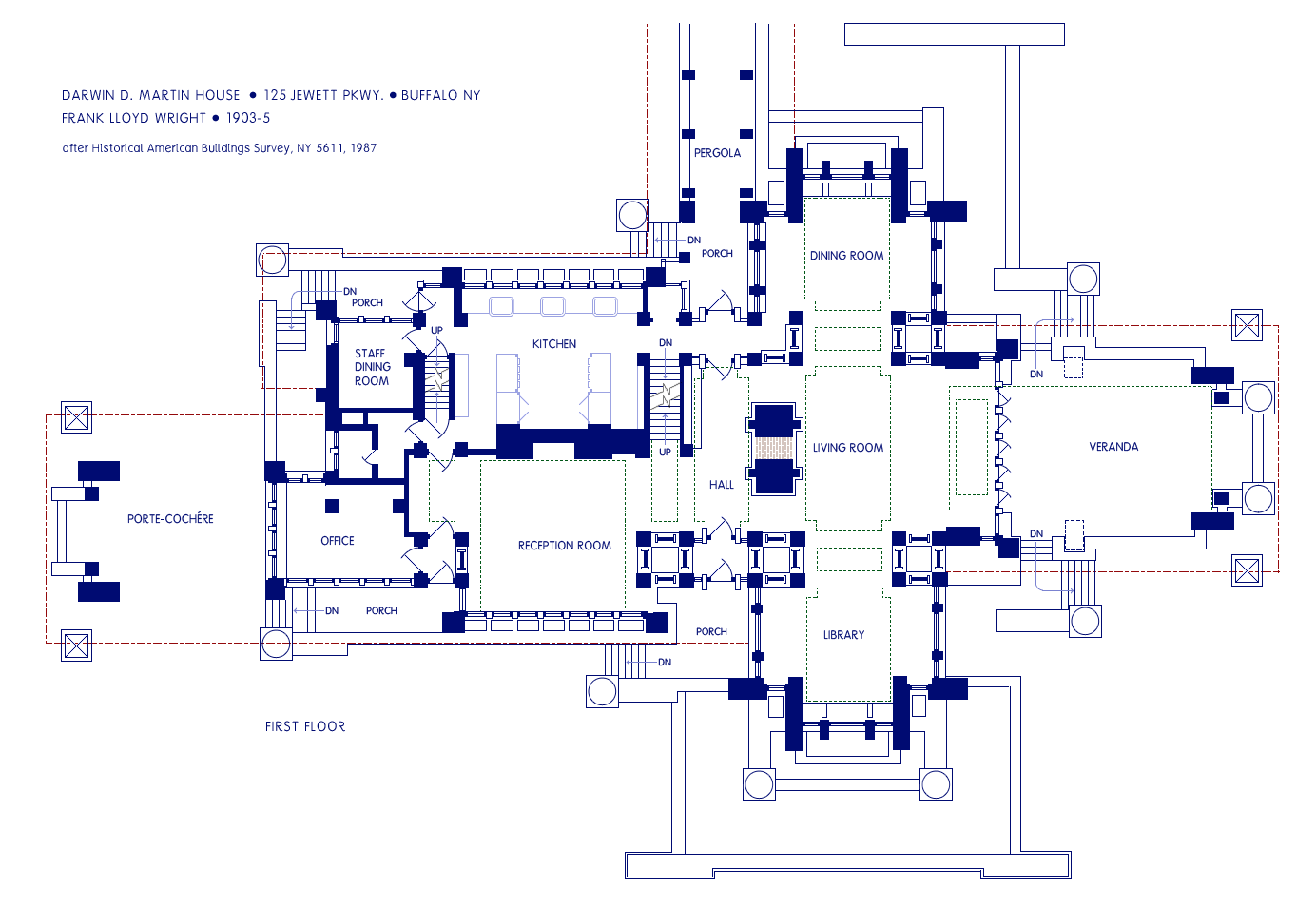
First floor

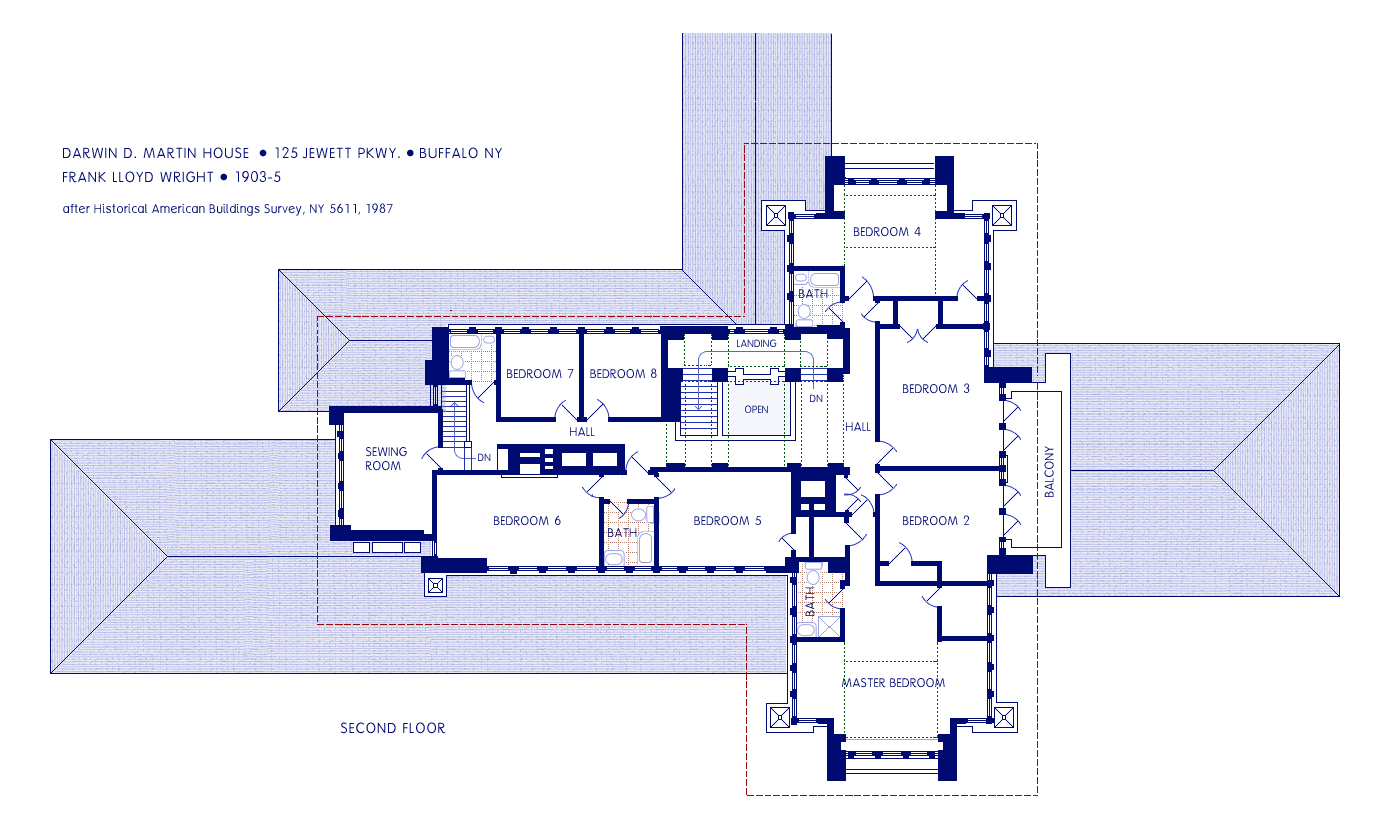
Second floor

The house's interior spans about 15,000 square feet (1,400 m^{2}). The first and second floors span about 10,000 square feet (930 m^{2}), and the basement covers another 5,000 square feet (460 m^{2}); these rest on concrete floor slabs. There are sixteen total rooms, including eight bedrooms and four bathrooms. Piers and cabinets create niches throughout the building. The decorations include 8.5 linear miles (13.7 km) of white-oak trim, along with dark woodwork. There are also gold leaf and mosaic tiles, creating what Quinan called "a burnished, glowing ambience" in the relatively poorly-lit spaces. As in Wright's other houses, the Martin House has low ceilings, catering to both Wright's and the Martins' relatively small statures. The house was originally heated by radiators, later replaced with a custom network of ducts. The house also had its own electric and hot-water generators.

The furniture was designed by Wright, who was responsible for all except three of the original pieces. Wright also decided where each object was positioned. The furniture designs are similar to the motifs that Wright used on the building's exterior. Many of these pieces included curved motifs, in contrast to Wright's previous furniture designs, which were mostly straight-edged. These designs include the "barrel chair", a cylindrical seat with a fluted backrest and wooden slats. Wright also designed furniture such as Slipper chairs and dining-table stanchions, along with sofas with built-in cabinets, circle-in-square tables, angled flowerpots, and iron sconces. The furniture was manufactured by Milwaukee firm Matthews Brothers Company. Among other pieces Wright designed was a custom book cover for one of the family's encyclopedias.

===== First story =====
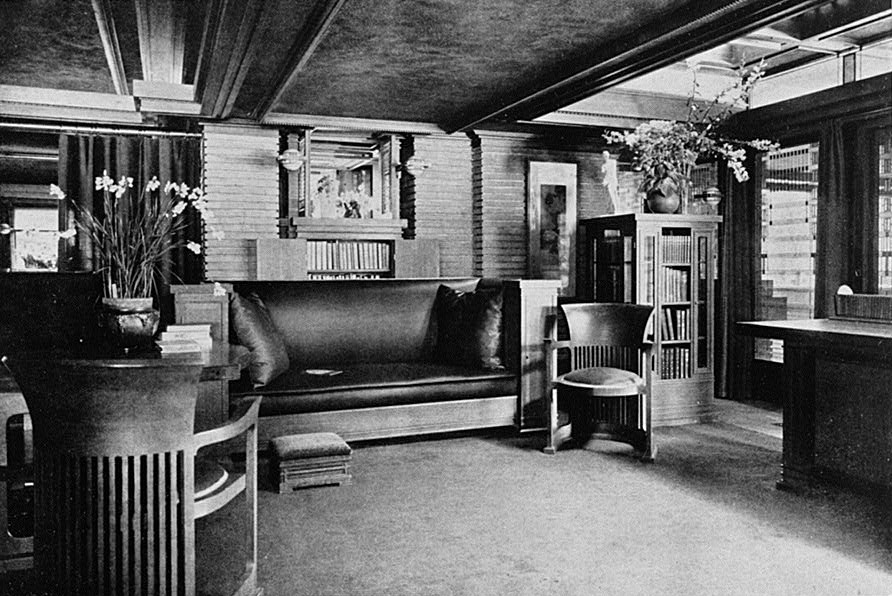
Early image of the living room

On the first floor, the east–west axis bisects a symmetrical north–south unit space with the dining room, living room, and library. To the west and north are service spaces such as a kitchen and staff dining room, along with an office, bathrooms, and wardrobes. To give the appearance that the spaces flowed into each other, Wright tried to reduce the boundaries between rooms. As such, the first-floor rooms have no traditional walls; the rooms are separated by small partitions and piers, which do not reach the ceiling. Furniture also forms boundaries between some rooms. The concrete-slab ceiling is supported by steel beams (which are concealed behind wood trim) and concrete lintels. The first-floor plan is interrupted by eight groupings of four piers, which support the ceiling beams and are made of Roman brick. The spaces between each pier have built-in bookshelves, which surround central radiators. Above the bookcases are laylights. There are light fixtures at the tops of the piers, which are spherical and have cubic casings. The joints between the bricks have brass and copper particles, which shimmer to create the impression of gold.

The main entrance leads to an entry hall, which leads north to the pergola. On the east wall (adjoining the living room) is a fireplace with openings on two sides; its mantelpieces contain 80,000 tiles. Known as the wisteria mosaic fireplace, it has a chimney with glass mosaics made by Giannini and Hilgart, which wrap around the chimney on all sides, depicting purple wisteria and green leaves. To the west is the reception room, which was used as a secondary living room. The reception room, and the kitchen to the north, constitute a space that is delineated by four groupings of piers. The reception room is a double height space with a coved ceiling, which is covered with a gold-flecked color wash. There is a "sunburst" fireplace in the reception room, with golden mosaic tiles. A 1960s renovation by Tafel added a domed skylight.

Darwin's private office, or "bursar", at the house's western end is accessed through a pier grouping. The bursar originally had a built-in desk. North of the reception room, the kitchen has built-in equipment, sinks, cabinets, and storage space, along with freestanding stools. Sanitary glass and linoleum flooring is used in the kitchen. Next to the kitchen, stairs wrap a small covered light well opening to the second floor. The stair has an oak railing and narrow balusters, along with a skylight above it.

East of the entry hall is the dining room, living room, and library from north to south, which are collectively known as the unit space. The living room is delineated by pier groupings at its corners. The western half of the living room has a hearthside area abutting the mosaic fireplace. The eastern half is an alcove with furniture and a piano; the furniture has casters, allowing them to be moved easily. The veranda extends east of the living room, forming a west–east axis with the fireplace. Because of the veranda's protruding roof, the living room is poorly illuminated, receiving light only from a small skylight, contrasting with the well-lit dining room and library adjoining it. The dining room has a built-in buffet with elaborate panels and doors, along with custom-made chairs. There is also a dining table with lights and planters at its corners. Since the bookshelves were scattered around the house, the library functioned more as a lounge, with rocking chairs, couches, and Morris chairs. The northern and southern ends of the unit space are supported by the three pairs of exterior piers.

===== Other stories =====
The second floor contains the bedrooms. Four bedrooms, including the master bedroom at the south end, constitute a north–south family wing directly above the unit space. The master bedroom has a Greek cross layout, with closets and bathrooms in the corners, and a wide window on one side. These are the only closets in the house, as Darwin reportedly disliked the feature. The north arm of the room has a built-in dresser and headboard; many of the original furnishings were replaced soon after the Martins moved in. The family wing's northern bedroom was used by the Martins' daughter Dorothy, and one of the center bedrooms was used by their son Darwin R. Four additional bedrooms flank a hallway extending west from the family wing; the northern two are for servants, and the southern two for guests. The guest bedrooms were used by Isabelle and her companion Cora Herrick by 1912. The second floor also has a terrace with a glass floor, as well as a sewing room. Bookshelves are scattered throughout the bedrooms. The second-floor ceilings are sloped and are made of plaster, with wood trim concealing the roof beams.

A small staircase descends from the first floor to the basement, where there were originally additional servant spaces. Storage and laundry areas were located at the western end of the basement, while the rest of that floor had a playroom.

=== Barton House ===
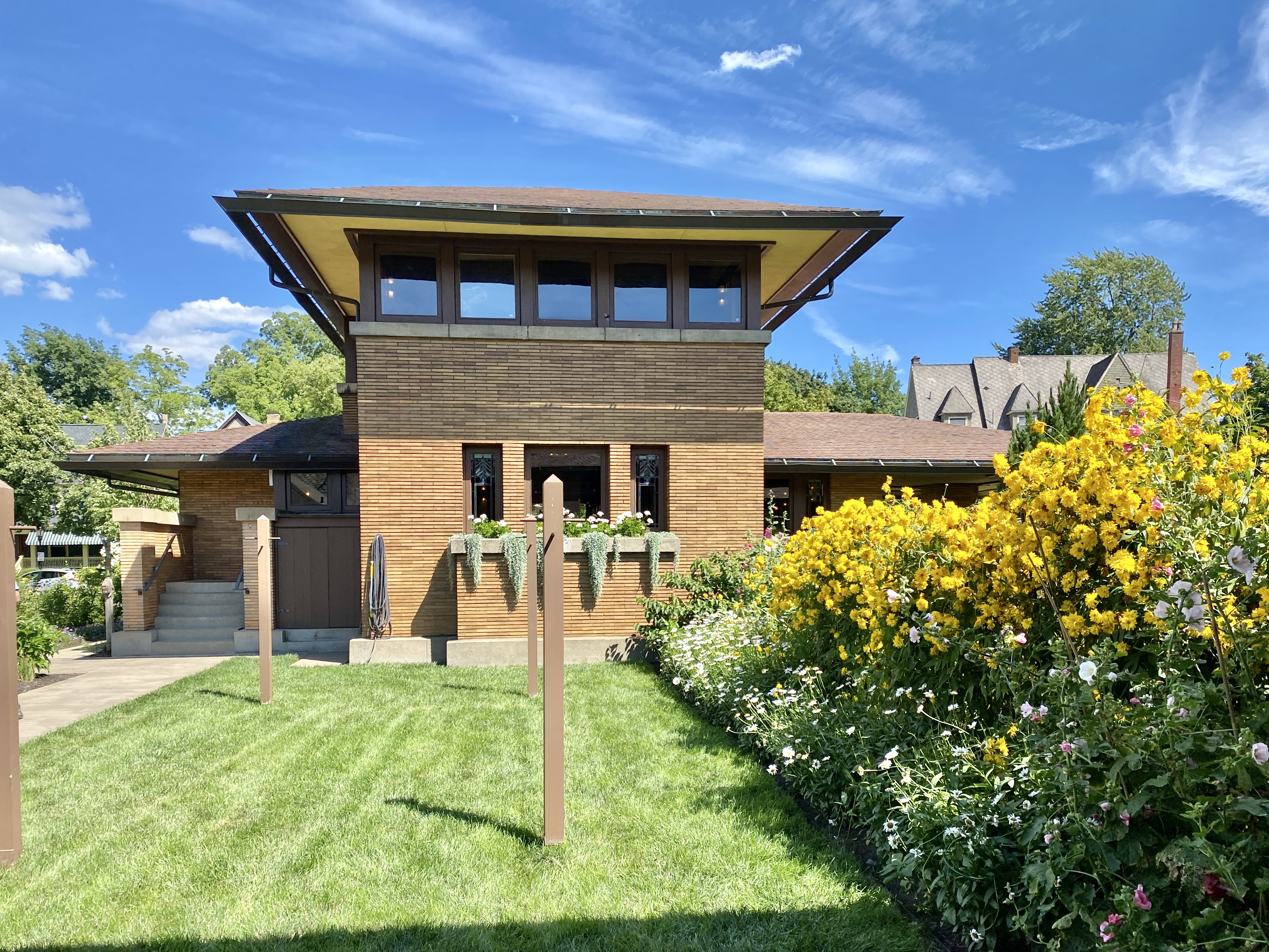
The Barton House

The Barton House, constructed in 1903, was not only the estate's first building to be completed but also Wright's first finished design in Buffalo. The Barton House is at the northeast corner of the estate, at 118 Summit Avenue. The house has a cruciform layout, with intersecting one- and two-story wings, and is clad with brick. The first-floor windows are placed in the center of the facade, while the second-floor windows wrap around the corners. A standalone brick wall links with the conservatory.

The interior spans 4,400 square feet (410 m^{2}). (Note: One source gives a contradictory area of 2,200 square feet (200 m^{2}) for the Barton House.) Its layout is similar to that of the exactly-contemporary J. J. Walser Jr. House in Chicago and the Home in the Prairie Town plan. There are eight rooms inside. The principal living spaces are concentrated in the central two-story portion of the house where the reception, living, and dining areas open into each other. Where the wings intersect, rectangular piers at each corner divide the first floor into a large central space and two smaller flanking spaces. Interior furniture and design details such as a stair, panels, and fireplace are arranged around the piers. Also on the first floor is a kitchen at the north end; a veranda extends from the reception hall to the south. The two main bedrooms are on the second story, flanking a narrow hall.

=== Outbuildings ===
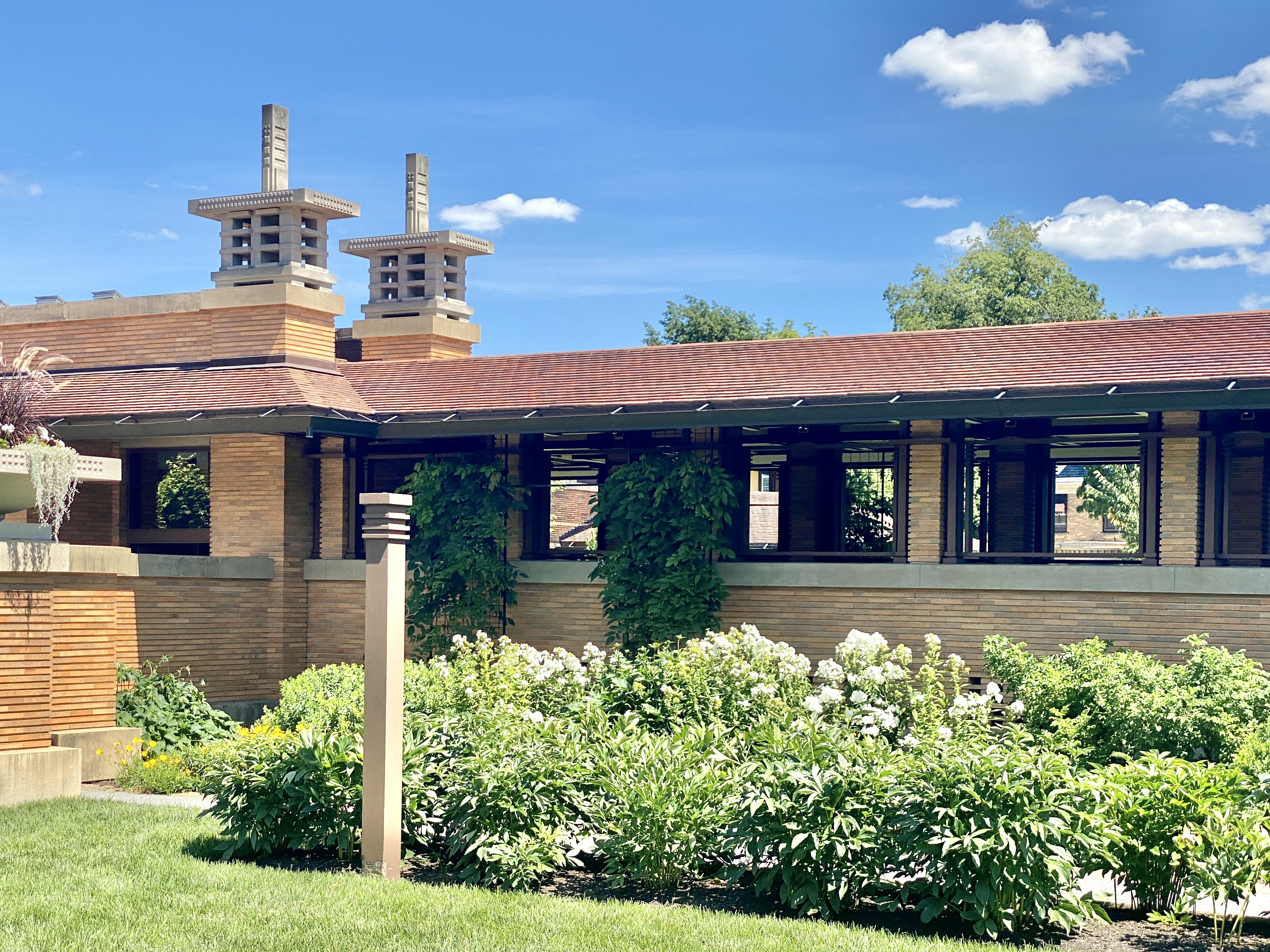
Pergola, as seen from one end

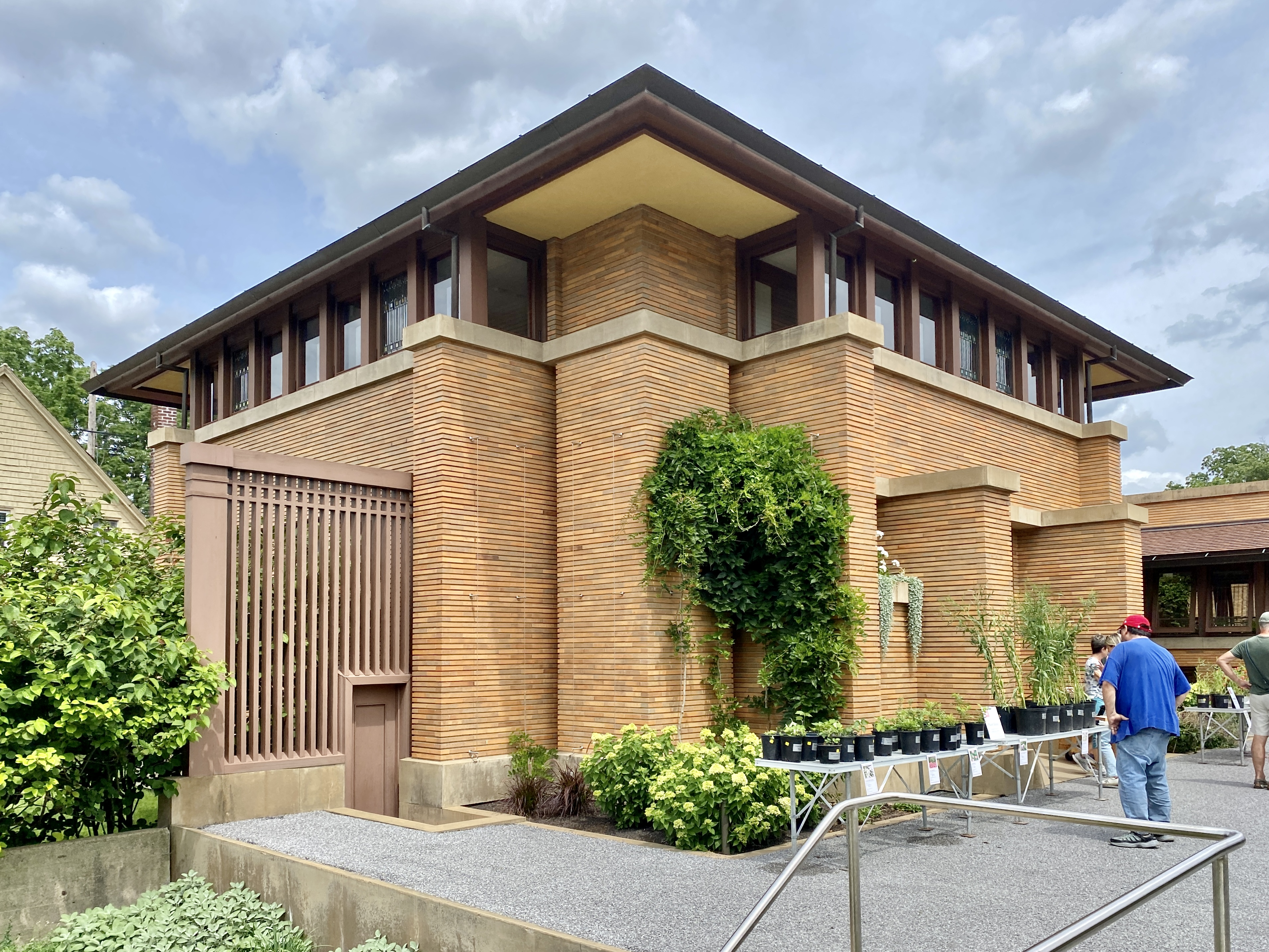
Carriage house

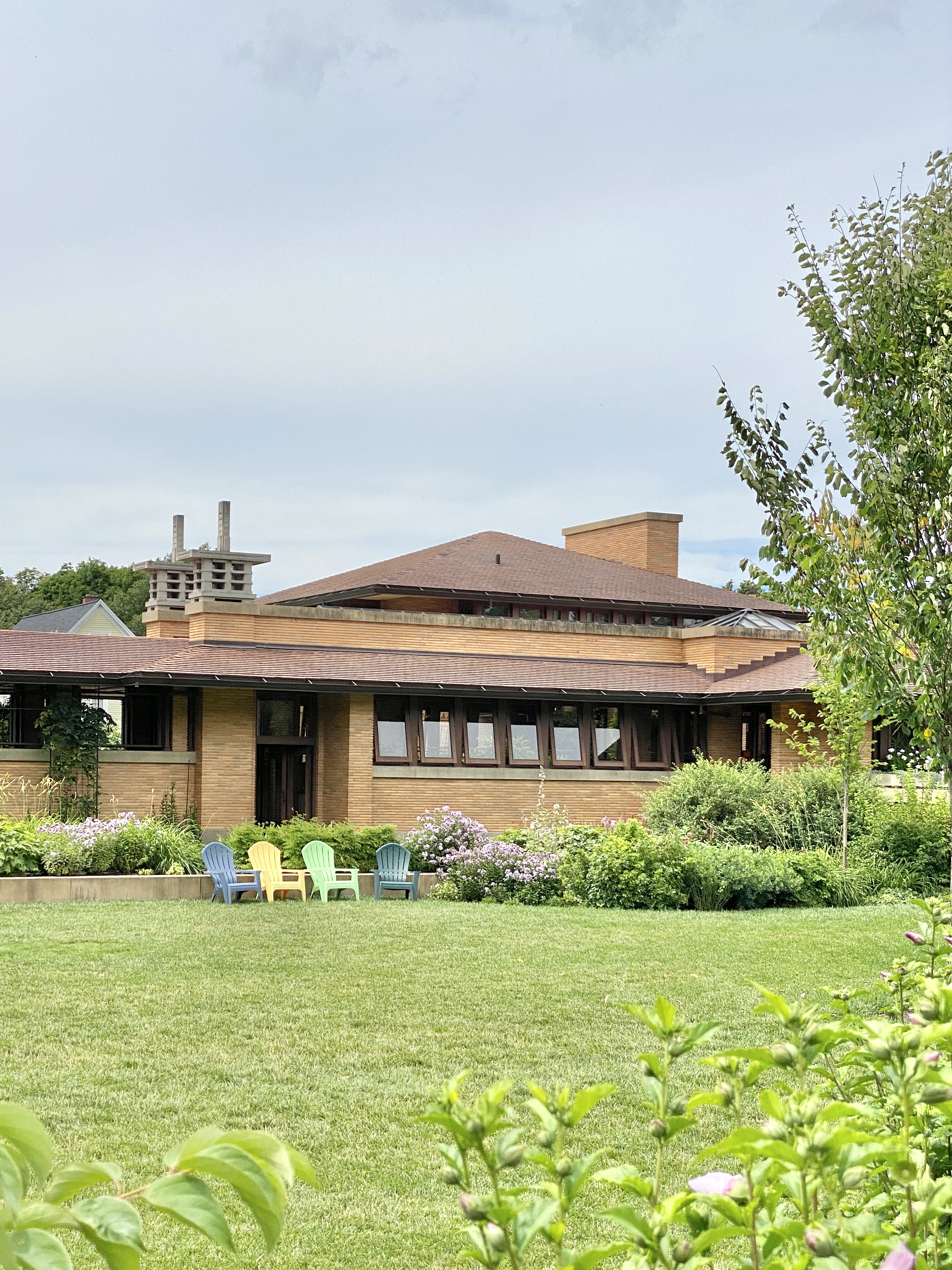
Conservatory

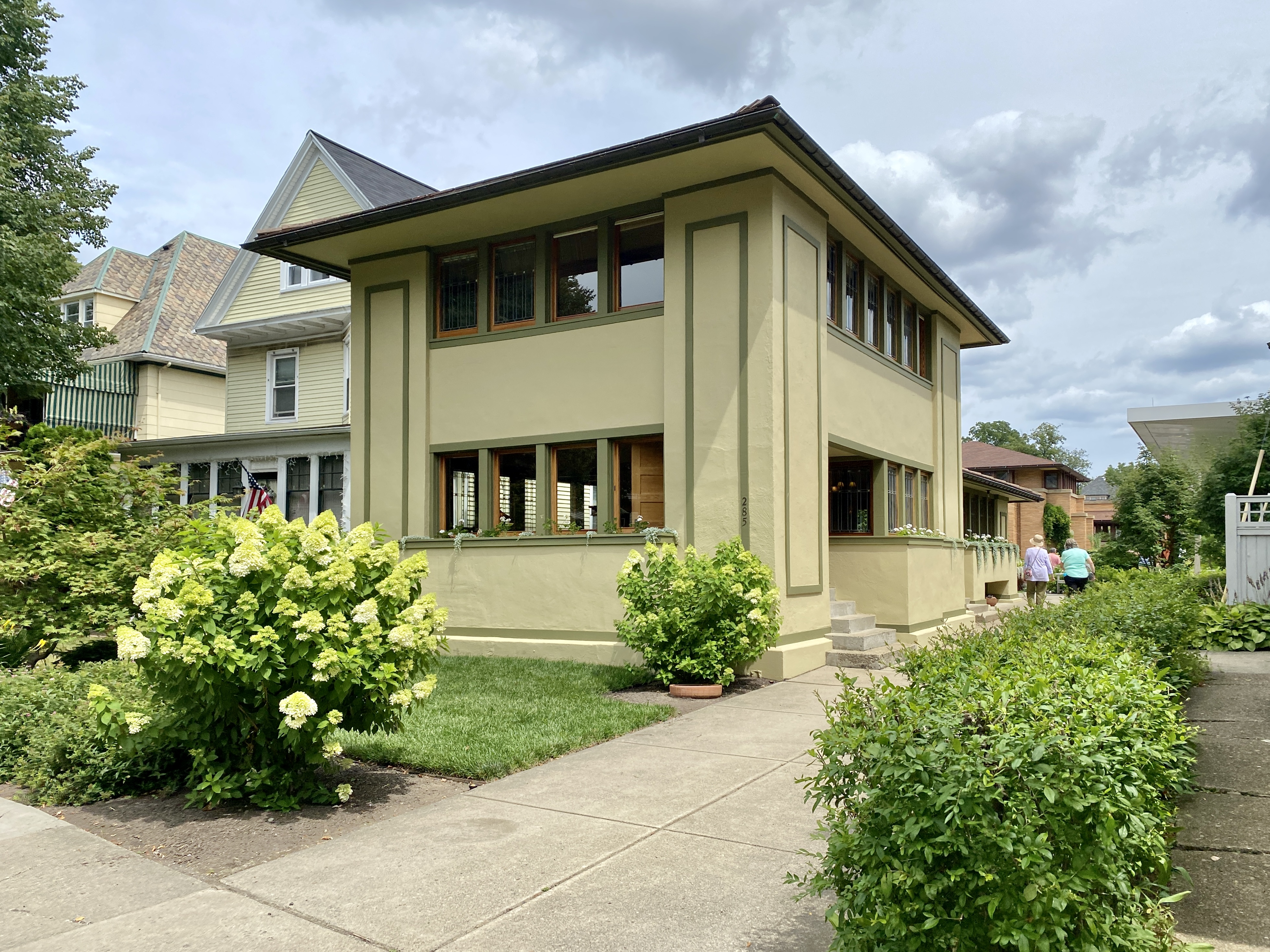
Gardener's cottage

The pergola runs from the Martin House's reception room north to the entrance of the conservatory and is about 100 feet (30 m) long. From the entrance hall, the pergola provides a vista of the conservatory 180 feet (55 m) to the north. The pergola's south end separates the main house's dining room from its kitchen, as the original Journal plan had envisioned a serving pantry in the space occupied by the pergola. The original pergola had stone birdhouses on its roof, designed by Wright. A 1904 article from the Buffalo Morning Express indicates that it may also have been intended as a bowling alley.

The conservatory spans about 2,700 square feet (250 m^{2}) and includes a 432-square-foot (40.1 m^{2}) greenhouse. The conservatory is at the north end of the estate between the carriage house and the Barton House, sitting adjacent to the original structure's foundation. It has a glass-and-metal roof supported by brick piers. The modern-day conservatory's roof has an aluminum frame with copper cladding, avoiding the corrosion that had plagued the original conservatory's steel frame. A plaster cast of Nike of Samothrace stands at the conservatory's entrance, in front of the pergola. It is a replica of the original conservatory's statue, which was made by the Caproni Brothers. The attached greenhouse has been used to grow vegetables for local community gardens.

The carriage house was constructed between 1903 and 1905 at the north end of the estate, just west of the Barton House. It spans 5,500 square feet (510 m^{2}). Originally, the carriage house had mechanical equipment in the basement, a carriage room and stables on the first floor, and a hay lot and coachman's residence on the second floor. The modern carriage house is used as a gift shop. A replica of the original stalls is also located in the rebuilt carriage house.

The gardener's cottage is on the west side of the estate, at 285 Woodward Avenue. The building spans 1,700 square feet (160 m^{2}). Built in 1909, it is made out of wood and stucco. The gardener's cottage has a boxy configuration, contrasting with other Wright designs where he sought to dilute the traditional boundaries of a box. He placed tall rectangular panels at each corner to give the illusion of piers.

=== Visitor pavilion ===
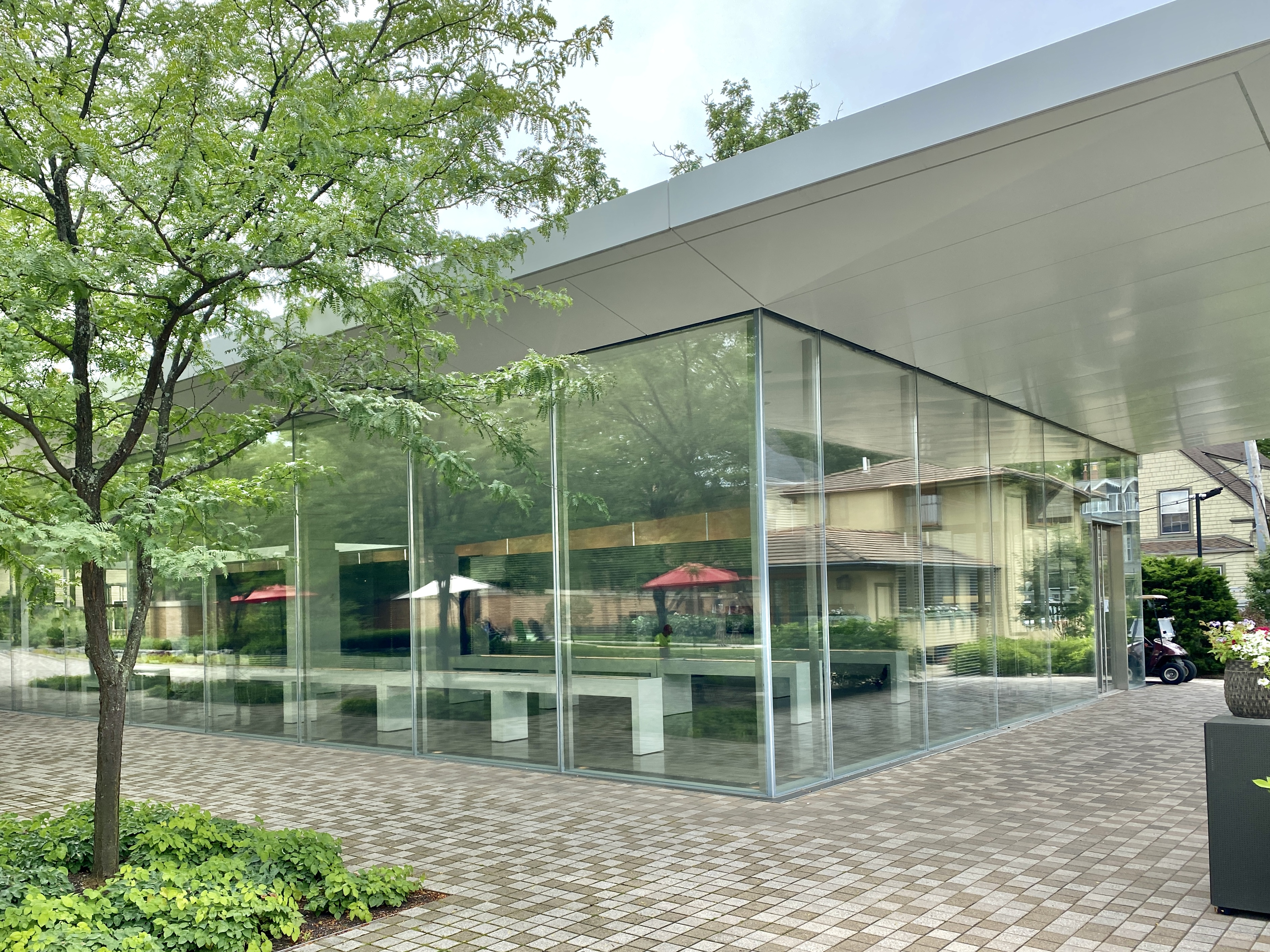
The Greatbatch Pavilion

Toshiko Mori's visitor center (opened 2009) is formally known as the Eleanor and Wilson Greatbatch Pavilion, after major donors Eleanor and Wilson Greatbatch. Unlike the other buildings, it sits just outside the estate itself, west of the main house. The site is in the middle of the block and not visible from the street. As originally planned in 2002, it would have spanned 15,000 square feet (1,400 m^{2}), with most of the floor area underground. The final building is significantly smaller at 7,775 square feet (722.3 m^{2}); the additional floor area was removed due to funding shortfalls.

The design was intended to allude to Wright's original design without being too conspicuous or discordant. It has a mostly glass-walled exterior, which is triple-glazed. One of the walls is made of concrete and has joints that give the impression of concrete blocks, an allusion to the use of brick in the main house. The visitor center has an inverted hip roof, which was intended to pay homage to the main house's roof; a skylight at the center illuminates the display boards inside. The roof collects snowpack to help insulate the interior during winter. Inside, there is a reception counter at the front, along with galleries and exhibition space behind. There is also a kitchen and restroom. Columns inside support the roof, and radiant heating and cooling is used inside. The floor plan was intended to evoke the spacing of the pergola's columns.

== Management ==
The house is operated by the Martin House Restoration Corporation (MHRC), which was founded in 1992 as a non-profit organization aiming to restore the estate's 1907 appearance and operate it as a museum. The organization is formally known as the Frank Lloyd Wright's Martin House Corporation, a 501(c)(3) organization. The Buffalo city government lists the MHRC as the owner of the parcels constituting the complex. The MHRC sells tickets for guided tours. Members, students, and senior citizens, along with Erie County residents during certain parts of the year, receive discounted tickets.

The MHRC hosts classes and events at the Martin estate, along with tours of the house. The house has a display room for the art-glass windows. It also hosts exhibits, such as a 2011 exhibition of vintage or replica furniture and a 2026 exhibition about decorations recovered from elsewhere. Notable visitors over the years have included Charlie Watts and Mick Jagger of The Rolling Stones.

== Impact and legacy ==
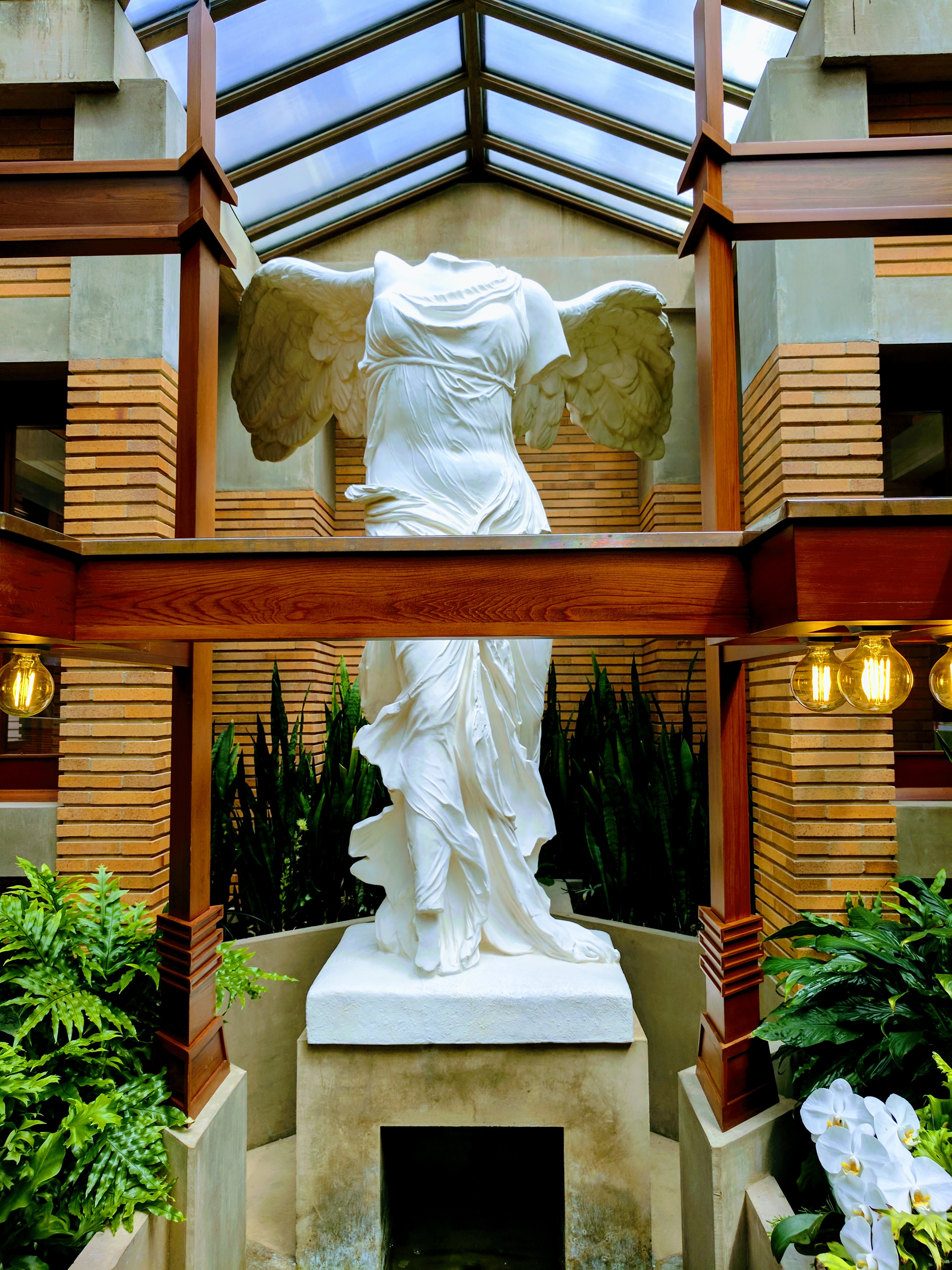
Nike of Samothrace statue at the Martin House's conservatory

Wright was especially fond of the Martin House design, referring to it for some 50 years as his "opus". Calling the estate "a well-nigh perfect composition", Wright kept the Martin site plan tacked to the wall near his drawing board for a half-century. Wright refined the designs of some of his later projects while working on the Martin estate. For example, his Henry Allen House (1918) incorporates similar design details to the Martin House; the two houses are the only Wright designs to use brass-and-copper particles in their joints. Other Wright designs include extensive windows and free-flowing spaces, similar to features in the Martin House. Over time, architecture students studied the estate extensively, including the demolished buildings.

=== Reception ===
==== Original complex ====
When the house was under construction, the Illustrated Buffalo Express called it "a house of many oddities", citing the near-complete lack of curved design elements. Shortly after its completion, the house was depicted in a series of photographs in the Architectural Record; Quinan writes that the photographs depicted the house as "intriguing and mysterious". The critic Henry-Russell Hitchcock wrote in the mid-20th century that the complex was "beautifully related to the natural setting and is appropriately human in scale", citing the use of deep eaves, window bands, and blending of interior and exterior design details. In 1970, The Architectural Review wrote that the house had been "remarkable in its day", citing the interconnected first-floor spaces and the use of glazed walls and porches to blend interior and exterior.

Ada Louise Huxtable of The New York Times, writing in 1977, regarded the estate as having been "badly mutilated" when the pergola and conservatory were demolished; she said the main house had undergone "well-meant but horribly damaging changes", contrasting with the painstaking preservation of the Barton House. In the 1980s, Paul Goldberger wrote that the estate "still evokes the promise of Wright's prairie residences" even in its partially-intact state, and The Buffalo News wrote that the house was still admired despite the impracticality of its small kitchen and bathrooms. A Washington Post writer said the building was "an original and dynamic composition", even though it, like other Wright designs, required high maintenance. Secrest wrote in 1992 that the building "seems ostentatiously, almost aggressively, on display", contrasting with its privacy-focused design details.

In 2000, a writer for the Washington Post described the roof as "intelligently conceived" and that the house originally had "such artful windows it would have been criminal to cover them". A writer for the Orlando Sentinel said that the building "looks experimental, abstract, faintly otherworldly" a century after its completion, and The Hamilton Spectator wrote that the house was revered for its scale, proportions, and landscape integration. Another writer, for Bloomberg News, said the house "shatters the genteel calm with its muscular power". When the renovation was completed, Suzanne Stephens of Architectural Record described the estate as a gesamtkunstwerk, or total piece of art. A writer for The Republican of Springfield, Massachusetts, praised the open-plan layout, gold-leaf tiles, and integration with the landscape.

Bruce Pfeiffer, the archivist at Wright's Taliesin West complex, considered the Martin House one of the 20th century's "seminal" works. Wright biographer Robert McCarter described the Martin House as "without doubt one of [Wright's] greatest achievements", and The New York Times considered it one of Wright's best Prairie-school designs outside the Midwest. Mori regarded the building as one of Wright's three most important house designs, alongside Fallingwater and the Robie House. The Globe and Mail called it among Wright's finest work, and the Toronto Star called it one of his "most emblematic houses". One source characterized the estate as "quite simply Wright's most extensive Prairie House ever". A Washington Post reporter in 2011 said the Martin House complex, including the rebuilt structures, was a Prairie-style paragon.

==== Later buildings ====
When the pergola, conservatory, and carriage house were rebuilt, Quinan wrote that the replicas "do not withstand close scrutiny", as they lacked the deterioration or damage expected of older buildings, and regarded the newer buildings as postmodern. Historian Robert Campbell welcomed the reconstruction of the three demolished structures but questioned whether the reconstructions could properly be considered preservation. Dave LeBlanc, writing for The Globe and Mail in 2012, agreed with an MHRC executive's contention that the reconstructions "make a big difference", saying that "all arguments to the contrary are irrelevant."

After Mori's visitor center was completed in 2009, Architect magazine said the Mori building "stands on it's [sic] own as an architectural destination", and The Globe and Mail wrote that the visitor center "neither overshadows nor grovels". The Architectural Review said the pavilion "frames a view enriched by information". LeBlanc described the visitor center and the reconstructed buildings as enhancing the original architecture.

=== Landmark designations, media, and exhibits ===
The estate, including the main house and the then-disconnected Barton House and gardener's cottage, was added to the National Register of Historic Places (NRHP) in 1975. The main house (but not the other buildings) was re-added to the NRHP as a National Historic Landmark (NHL) in 1986 for its national architectural significance. The NHL designation provided tax credits and required that proposed modifications receive federal approval. The Martin House is a contributing property to the Parkside East Historic District, listed on the NRHP. The complex is also designated as the Darwin Martin House State Historic Site, a New York State Historic Site.

During its 2000s restoration, the house was the focus of a 2005 exhibit at the Carnegie Museum of Art. Stone birdhouses from the original pergola were exhibited at the Albright-Knox Art Gallery in 1966. Several of the windows have been shown at temporary exhibits, including at the Richard Feigen Gallery (1968), Renwick Gallery (1973), Museum of Modern Art (1994), Chicago Botanic Garden (1997), National Building Museum (2000), Boca Raton Museum of Art (2003), and Milwaukee Art Museum (2017). In 2009, the MHRC sponsored a traveling exhibition, Windows of the Darwin D. Martin House. The Renwick Gallery has also exhibited the original chairs, and replicas of these chairs are located at the Allentown Art Museum.

Wright's associate Harry Robinson drew sketches of the house for Ernst Wasmuth's 1910 Wasmuth Portfolio. One preservationist in 1991 estimated that the Martin House or its design elements had been depicted or detailed in over 50 books. Books describing the house in detail have included Quinan's Frank Lloyd Wright's Martin House (2004) and Margot Stipe's Frank Lloyd Wright: The Rooms (2014). The 2000s renovation was depicted in a 2004 TV program, and the house was also featured in the 2007 documentary Frank Lloyd Wright's Buffalo. An animated tour of the house was released on CD-ROM in 1995. The design, or parts of it, have also been replicated in items ranging from physical models to clothing. Replicas of the house's original stained-glass windows and barrel chairs have been manufactured and sold. Wright also reused the chair design in some of his other houses, adapting the chair for his own Wisconsin studio and for the Wingspread house he designed for Herbert Fisk Johnson Jr..

== See also ==
- National Register of Historic Places listings in Buffalo, New York
- List of Frank Lloyd Wright works
- List of National Historic Landmarks in New York
