= Parkside East Historic District =

Historic district in New York, United States

- U.S. National Register of Historic Places
- U.S. Historic district
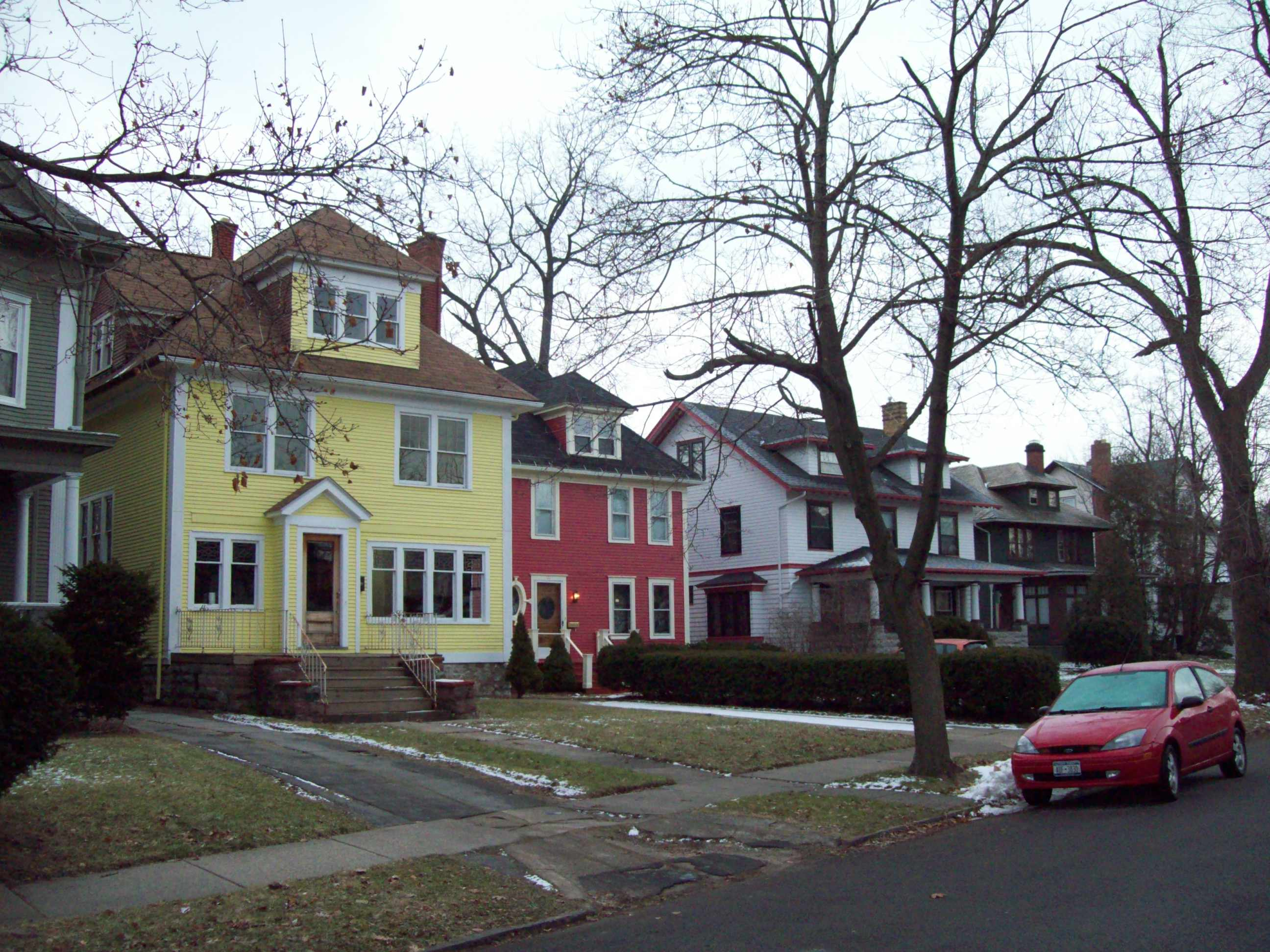
- Streetscape in Parkside East Historic District, December 2009

- Location within New York Location within the United States
- Location: Roughly bounded by Parkside Ave., Amherst St., Colvin Ave., NY Central RR tracks, Main St., and Humboldt Ave., Buffalo, New York
- Coordinates: 42°56′9″N 78°50′59″W
- Area: 226 acres (91 ha)
- Built: 1876
- Architect: Wright, Frank Lloyd; Et al.
- Architectural style: Colonial Revival, Prairie School, American Four Square
- MPS: Olmsted Parks and Parkways TR
- NRHP reference No.: 86002817
- Added to NRHP: October 17, 1986

Parkside East Historic District is a national historic district located at Buffalo in Erie County, New York. The district is architecturally and historically significant for its association with the 1876 Parks and Parkways Plan for the city of Buffalo developed by Frederick Law Olmsted. It consists of 1,769 contributing structures (1,109 principal buildings, 659 outbuildings) developed from 1876 to 1936, as a middle class residential neighborhood. The district largely contains single-family dwellings, built in a variety of popular architectural styles, and located along the irregular and curvilinear street pattern developed by Olmsted. The district is located to the east of Buffalo's Delaware Park and includes the Walter V. Davidson House and the separately listed Darwin D. Martin House, both designed by Frank Lloyd Wright.

It was listed on the National Register of Historic Places in 1986.
