= E-Z Polish Factory =

Factory building in Chicago, Illinois

Coordinates: 41.887443°N 87.701779°W

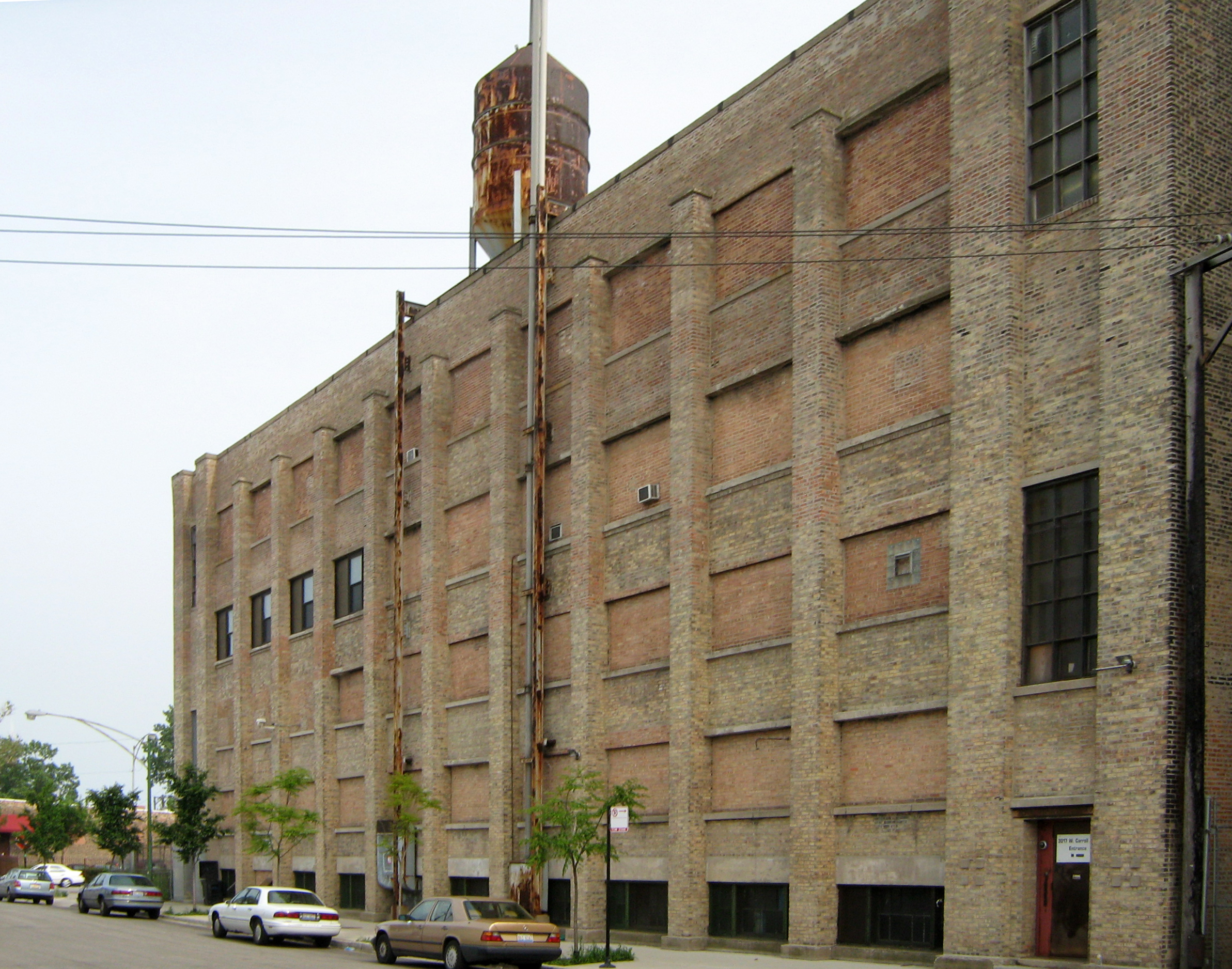
E-Z Polish Factory

The E-Z Polish Factory (built 1905), the only factory building designed by Frank Lloyd Wright, is located at 3005 West Carroll Avenue in Chicago, Illinois, United States. The E-Z Polish Company made polish for shoes and stoves. The building now serves as practice space for local bands and artists.

The factory was at one point forgotten as a Wright design. In 1939, architectural historian Grant Carpenter Manson was writing his Harvard doctoral dissertation and followed a clue that the factory was located somewhere along the Galena division of the Chicago and Northwestern Railway. Manson rode back and forth on the line until he located the factory.

The structure was an exercise in concrete construction technique. It is one of the least decorative designs of Wright's career.

Wright's original design for the factory included an elaborate scheme for an open court between side wings at the rear. The plans for the court were found at Taliesin but were never executed.

The company was owned by William E. Martin of Oak Park and Darwin D. Martin of Buffalo, New York. Wright also designed the William E. Martin House in 1902.

== See also ==
- List of Frank Lloyd Wright works
