= William E. Martin House =

House in Oak Park, Illinois

Coordinates: 41.897702°N 87.789454°W

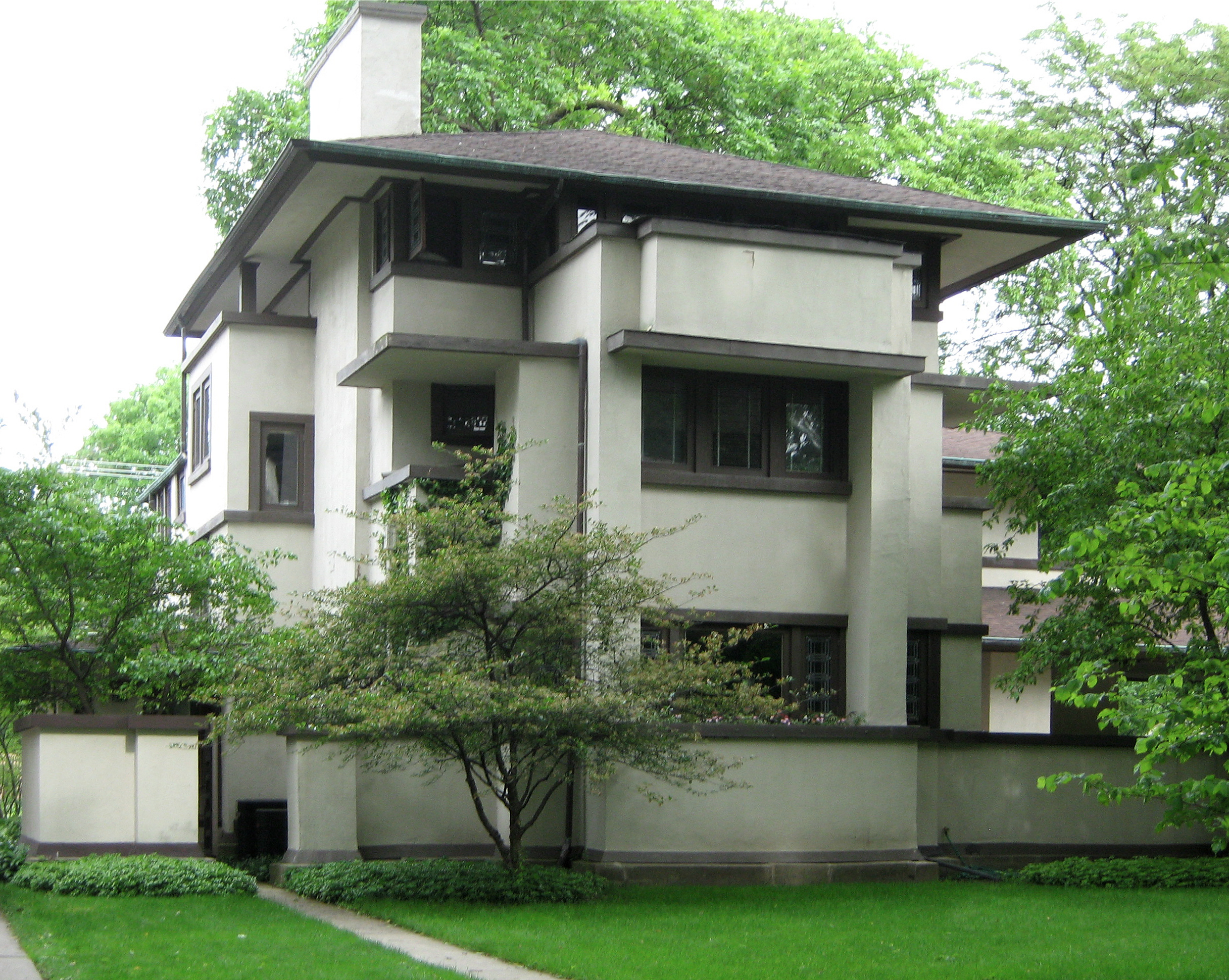
The Martin House

The William E. Martin House is a Prairie style home designed in 1902 by American architect Frank Lloyd Wright at 636 N. East Avenue in Oak Park, a suburb of Chicago, Illinois, United States. W.E. Martin was inspired to commission Wright for a home after he and his brother, Darwin D. Martin drove around Oak Park looking at Wright's homes. After meeting with Wright, William Martin excitedly wrote his brother, "I've been—seen—talked to, admired, one of nature's noblemen—Frank Lloyd Wright."

The wood and stucco home W.E. Martin commissioned has three bedrooms and two bathrooms on three stories (to accomplish the need for space on the size of the lot). The building also included a pergola (since destroyed).

A visit to the home by brother Darwin persuaded him to commission his home from the architect, and later recommend Wright as the architect of the headquarters for the company Darwin worked for, the Larkin Company.

== See also ==
- List of Frank Lloyd Wright works
