= Colden, New York =

- Town
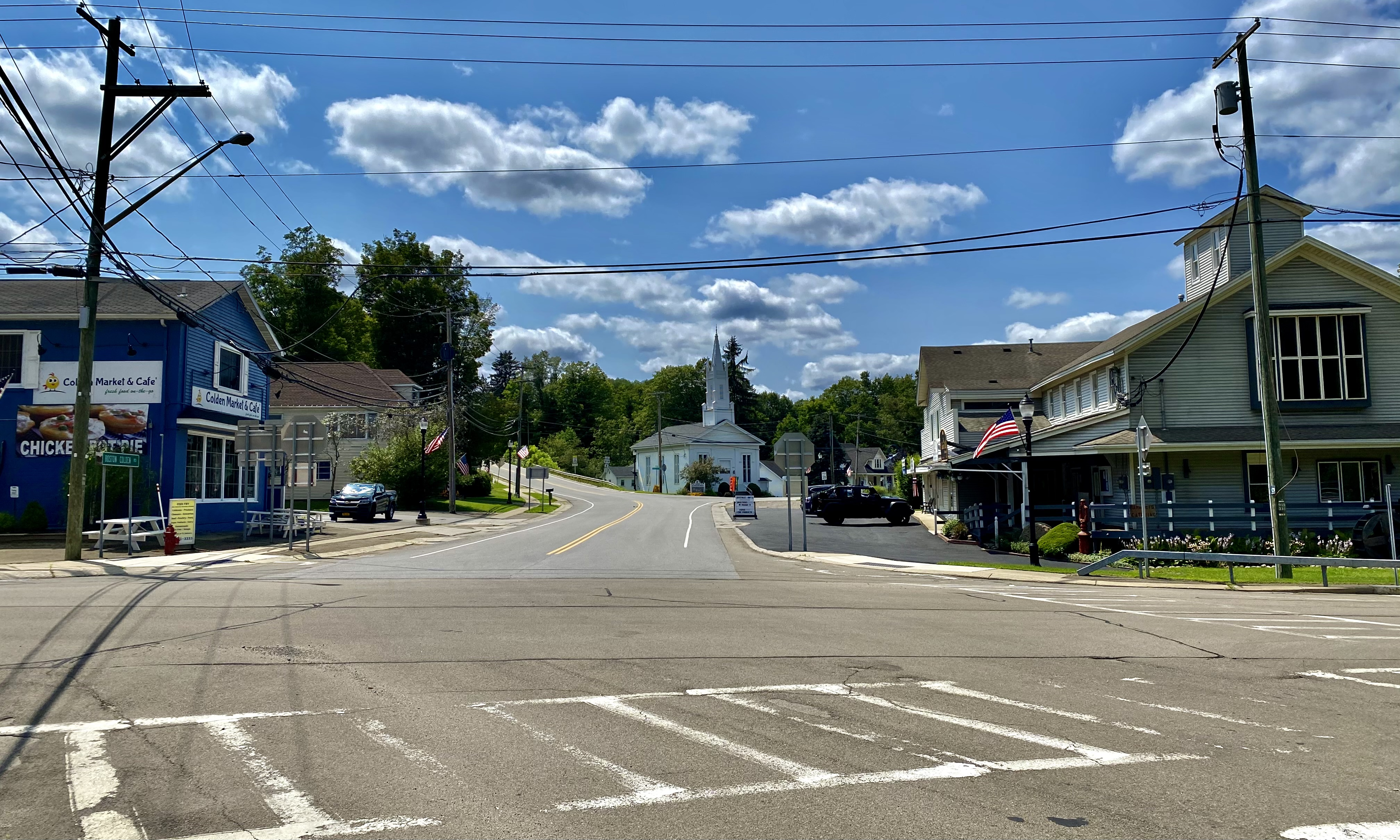
- Town center, July 2021

- Logo

- Location in Erie County and the state of New York

- Location of New York in the United States
- Coordinates: 42°38′39″N 78°41′05″W
- Country: United States
- State: New York
- County: Erie
- Incorporated: 1827
- Named after: Cadwallader D. Colden

Government
  - Mayor: James DePasquale (D) Town Council: Gerald F. Pietraszek (R); Jesse Hyrcik (D); Patricia Zurbrick (R); (R)

Area
  - Total: 35.72 sq mi (92.52 km^{2})
  - Land: 35.63 sq mi (92.29 km^{2})
  - Water: 0.089 sq mi (0.23 km^{2})
- Elevation: 1,183 ft (361 m)

Population (2020)
  - Total: 3,121
  - Density: 87.4/sq mi (33.73/km^{2})
- Time zone: UTC-5 (EST)
  - Summer (DST): UTC-4 (EDT)
- ZIP Codes: 14033 (Colden); 14069 (Glenwood); 14025 (Boston); 14080 (Holland); 14170 (West Falls)
- Area code: 716
- FIPS code: 36-029-16870
- Website: townofcolden.com

Colden is a town in Erie County, New York, United States. The population was 3,121 at the 2020 census. The town derives its name from Cadwallader D. Colden, a state senator. Colden is an interior town in the southeastern part of the county. It is one of the "Southtowns" of Erie County.

== History ==
The town of Colden was organized April 2, 1827, from part of the town of Holland. One of the first settlers was Richard Buffum from Rhode Island. He purchased 2,000 acres (8.1 km^{2}) from the Holland Land Company.

== Geography ==
According to the United States Census Bureau, the town has a total area of 35.7 square miles (92.5 km^{2}), of which 35.6 square miles (92.3 km^{2}) is land and 0.1 square miles (0.2 km^{2}), or 0.25%, is water.

New York State Route 240 passes through the southwest part of the town.

== Demographics ==
Historical population
Census	Pop.	Note	%±
1830	464		—
1840	1,088		134.5%
1850	1,344		23.5%
1860	1,568		16.7%
1870	1,472		−6.1%
1880	1,464		−0.5%
1890	1,378		−5.9%
1900	1,260		−8.6%
1910	1,303		3.4%
1920	1,259		−3.4%
1930	1,217		−3.3%
1940	1,528		25.6%
1950	1,720		12.6%
1960	2,384		38.6%
1970	3,020		26.7%
1980	3,128		3.6%
1990	2,899		−7.3%
2000	3,323		14.6%
2010	3,265		−1.7%
2020	3,121		−4.4%

As of the census of 2000, there were 3,323 people, 1,262 households, and 951 families residing in the town. The population density was 93.2 inhabitants per square mile (36.0/km^{2}). There were 1,337 housing units at an average density of 37.5 per square mile (14.5/km^{2}). The racial makeup of the town was 98.83% White, 0.03% African American, 0.21% Native American, 0.18% Asian, 0.09% from other races, and 0.66% from two or more races. Hispanic or Latino of any race were 0.42% of the population.

There were 1,262 households, out of which 32.4% had children under the age of 18 living with them, 63.7% were married couples living together, 7.8% had a female householder with no husband present, and 24.6% were non-families. 18.7% of all households were made up of individuals, and 6.2% had someone living alone who was 65 years of age or older. The average household size was 2.63 and the average family size was 3.01.

In the town, the population was spread out, with 24.9% under the age of 18, 6.1% from 18 to 24, 29.9% from 25 to 44, 27.3% from 45 to 64, and 11.7% who were 65 years of age or older. The median age was 40 years. For every 100 females, there were 102.6 males. For every 100 females age 18 and over, there were 101.8 males.

The median income for a household in the town was $47,230, and the median income for a family was $52,460. Males had a median income of $39,524 versus $28,269 for females. The per capita income for the town was $22,510. About 2.7% of families and 3.4% of the population were below the poverty line, including 3.0% of those under age 18 and 1.8% of those age 65 or over.

== Schools ==
The town is covered by the Springville-Griffith Institute Central School District and Holland Central School District. The Colden Elementary School (K-5) is located within the town.

== Communities and locations in Colden ==
- Buffalo Ski Club – A semi-private ski resort (which includes the former Tamarack Ski resort, the former Sitzmarker Area and Buffalo Area). This is a member-owned club that is open to the public.
- Buffums Mills – A historical location in the town.
- Colden – The hamlet of Colden is in the west part of the town on NY-240.
- Glenwood – A hamlet south of the hamlet of Colden on NY-240.
- Kissing Bridge – A ski resort on NY-240.

== Points of interest ==
- WIVB-TV Tower, one of the oldest supertall TV towers in the United States.

== Notable people ==
- Tim Bender, snowmobile Hall of Fame rider and NASCAR driver
- John M. Wiley, former US congressman
