= Larkinville =

Neighborhood of Buffalo, New York

Larkinville The Hydraulics
- Neighborhood of Buffalo
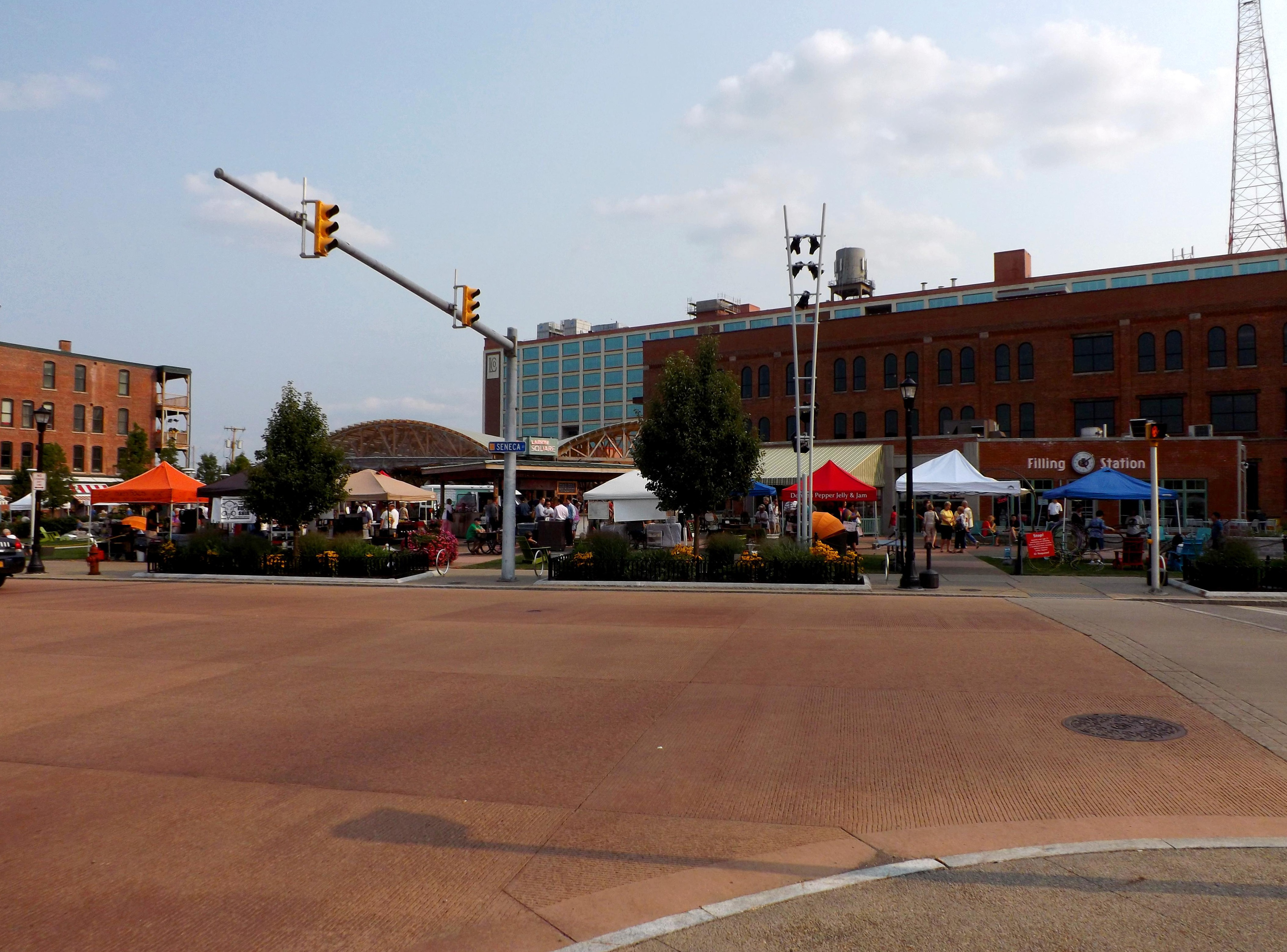
- Larkin Square in 2014

- Location within New York Location within the United States
- Coordinates: 42°52′30″N 78°51′07″W
- Country: United States
- State: New York
- County: Erie County
- City: Buffalo
- Website: larkinsquare.com

Larkinville, also known as The Hydraulics, is an area of Buffalo, New York located near downtown, South Buffalo and Canalside. Once an industrial neighborhood, it is now home to offices, shops, and a public gathering space called Larkin Square that regularly features food trucks, events, and concerts. The current form of the neighborhood came as a result of the gentrification of the former headquarters complex of the Larkin Soap Company, which includes the Larkin Terminal Warehouse, and other abandoned warehouses nearby.

== History ==
The Buffalo Hydraulic Association was formed in 1827, constructing the Hydraulic Canal as the city's first source of industrial power on the site of the neighborhood. Soon after, numerous mills sprang up on the site, now called the Hydraulics. In 1876, John D. Larkin began manufacturing soap in the neighborhood, laying the foundation for his company, which became a large mail-order soap company well into the early twentieth century.

By 1901 there were 87 retail businesses on Seneca Street between Larkin and Smith streets, housed in numerous warehouses and buildings, of which many still stand to this day. Buildings such as the famed Larkin Administration Building, the Larkin Terminal Warehouse, and the 250-foot tall chimney of the Larkin Powerhouse were erected between 1902 and 1912. The Larkin Company continued its prosperity until the 1930s after the death of John Larkin and the Great Depression, going out of business in the 1940s. The Larkin Administration Building was demolished in 1950.

In 2002, the Larkin Terminal Warehouse was purchased by the Larkin Development Group. The renovation of this building sparked the revitalization of the Hydraulics neighborhood, as the Larkin Development Group acquired numerous other buildings in the neighborhood with the vision of creating a vibrant mixed-use neighborhood. By 2012, Larkin Square opened along with the Filling Station restaurant, and more renovated buildings opened in later years. It has since become an entertainment district and has seen residential and commercial uses.

== Buildings and attractions ==
- Larkin Terminal Warehouse, a 10-story former warehouse that now houses offices for The John R. Oishei Foundation, Kaleida Health and KeyBank (formerly First Niagara Bank)
- Remains of the Larkin Administration Building can still be visited
- Larkin Square — the gathering place features events such as Food Truck Tuesdays, Larkin Live Wednesdays, as well as author visits, weddings and parties.

== See also ==
- Canalside
- South Buffalo
- Larkin Company
