= Holland Junior/Senior High School =

Holland High School

Location
- 103 Canada St; Holland (Town), (Erie County), New York 14080; United States
- 42.6452°N 78.5410°W

Information
- School type: Public school (government funded), high school
- Established: 1933
- School district: Holland Central School District
- NCES District ID: 3614550
- Superintendent: Eric Lawton
- CEEB code: 332405
- NCES School ID: 361455001205
- Principal: Jason Jacobs
- Faculty: 29.57 (on an FTE basis)
- Teaching staff: Ms. Justinger, Mr. Wojcik, Mr. Carr, Mrs. Waligora, Mr. Hall, Mr. Ranic, Mr. Booker, and many more
- Grades: 9–12
- Gender: Coeducational
- Enrollment: 225 (2023-2024)
- Student to teacher ratio: 11.91
- Schedule type: A and B days
- Hours in school day: 7:30-2:21
- Campus: Rural: Distant
- Colors: Purple and Gold
- Fight song: This is our team, this our town, we bleed gold! Yes we fight! Yes we do! We'll puke up purple on you! Go Dutchmen beat them down, lets show them who the real team is! Go DUTCHMEN!
- Athletics: Yes
- Sports: Soccer, Volleyball, Golf, Football, Basketball, Indoor Track, Bowling, Track, Baseball, Girls Flag Football
- Mascot: Dutchman
- Yearbook: Yearbook

Holland High School is a public high school located in the Town of Holland, Erie County, New York, U.S.A., and is the only high school operated by the Holland Central School District. Holland is a very small school district with its most recent graduating class (2024) only having 59 students.
