= Larkin Administration Building =

Office building in Buffalo, New York

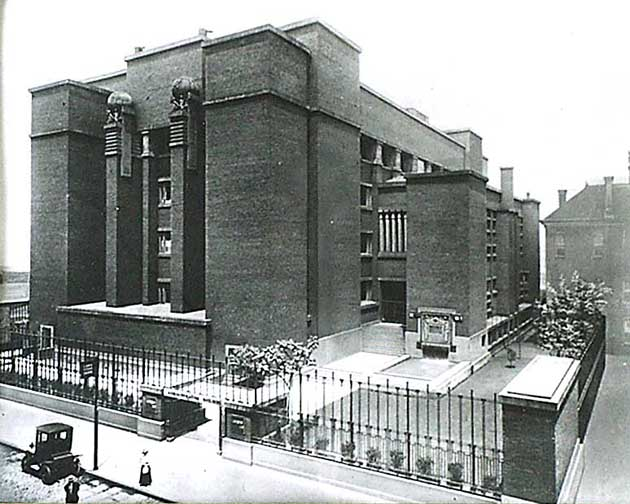
- The Larkin Building in 1906

General information
- Architectural style: Modern (early)
- Location: 680 Seneca Street, Buffalo, New York, US
- Coordinates: 42.8768°N 78.8518°W
- Construction started: 1904
- Opened: 1906
- Renovated: 1939 (Larkin Store)
- Closed: 1944
- Demolished: February–July 1950
- Cost: $1 million (Note: Equivalent to $26.8 million in 2025)
- Owner: Larkin Company

Technical details
- Material: Brick, sandstone
- Size: 200 by 134 ft (61 by 41 m)
- Floor count: 6.5 (main building); 5 (annex)

Design and construction
- Architects: Frank Lloyd Wright; Richard Bock (decorations)
- Architecture firm: Frank Lloyd Wright Studio

The Larkin Administration Building (a.k.a. the Larkin Building or Administration Building) was an office building at 680 Seneca Street in Buffalo, New York, United States. Constructed for the Larkin Soap Company, it was designed by Frank Lloyd Wright with ornamentation by the sculptor Richard Bock. The building, Wright's first-ever commercial design, was completed in 1906 and demolished in 1950. It was composed of a six-story main building and a five-story annex, connected by a shorter entrance pavilion at their lowest two stories.

Larkin Company executives Darwin D. Martin and William R. Heath helped convince the company's president John D. Larkin to hire Wright to design the building. Wright drew up plans between 1903 and 1904, and the building took another two years to construct. After its completion, the Administration Building was used mostly by the Larkin Company's mail order departments and administrative offices. The Larkin Store Corporation leased the building in 1939. Pennsylvania contractor L.B. Smith bought the Administration Building in 1943 and abandoned it after the Larkin Store's lease expired the next year. Despite multiple plans to find another use for the building, it remained derelict until it was sold to the Western Trading Corporation in 1949. The building was demolished between February and July 1950, with its remains being used as fill. The site became a parking lot after Western Trading abandoned plans to redevelop it. One pier and some scattered decorations from the building remain intact.

The building had dark red brick facades and steel frames, with interiors grouped around two light courts. There was little ornamentation, except for piers on the facade and inside. The main building had a rectangular plan, with towers for staircases and utilities at its corners. Inside, the main building's basement included machinery and service spaces; the first through fourth stories contained various offices; and the fifth story included dining areas. Spaces such as a lounge, locker rooms, restrooms, and a classroom were placed in the annex. The building had several innovations for its time, which included central air conditioning, built-in furniture, and wall-mounted toilets. The Larkin Administration Building was praised both during its existence and after its demolition, and architectural critics such as Paul Goldberger lamented its loss.

== Site ==
The Larkin Administration Building was located at 680 Seneca Street in Buffalo, New York, occupying a trapezoidal site. Part of a massive industrial complex built by the Larkin Company, it was sometimes called the A Building. The Larkin Company's other buildings, labeled as buildings B through O, were on the south side of Seneca Street, opposite the Larkin Administration Building. A tunnel connected to one of these buildings, the Larkin Terminal Warehouse. The other Larkin buildings, some of which still exist, are part of the modern-day Larkinville neighborhood.

The lot was bounded to the north by Swan Street and to the south by Seneca Street. To the northwest, the site adjoins a series of railroad tracks (specifically CSX Transportation's Niagara Subdivision and Buffalo Terminal Subdivision). At the time, products were shipped out mainly through the railroads, hauled predominantly by steam engines that produced large amounts of emissions and noise. The presence of the railroads and industrial complex influenced the building's self-enclosed design and mechanical features. When the building existed, a wrought iron fence surrounded the site, and there was greenery outside.

== History ==
=== Development ===
The Larkin Administration Building was built for the Larkin Soap Company, founded in 1875 by John D. Larkin, who had recently moved to his native Buffalo from Chicago. Larkin built a two-story factory in Buffalo, which was both his hometown and a major trading hub. Like other companies of the time, Larkin and his business partner Elbert Hubbard originally hired salesmen to sell soap to distributors in person. These salesmen included Darwin D. Martin, who eventually became a senior executive at the company. Larkin and Hubbard began selling soap directly to clients in the 1880s, and during the next decade, they began giving "premiums" of household items to clients who made bulk orders. Both these practices increased the Larkin Company's business greatly, and the business model—intended to save the company's customers large amounts of money—was a point of pride for the company. After Hubbard left the company in 1893, Martin and William R. Heath were made senior executives of the company: Martin as secretary, and Heath as head of the legal department.

==== Commission ====
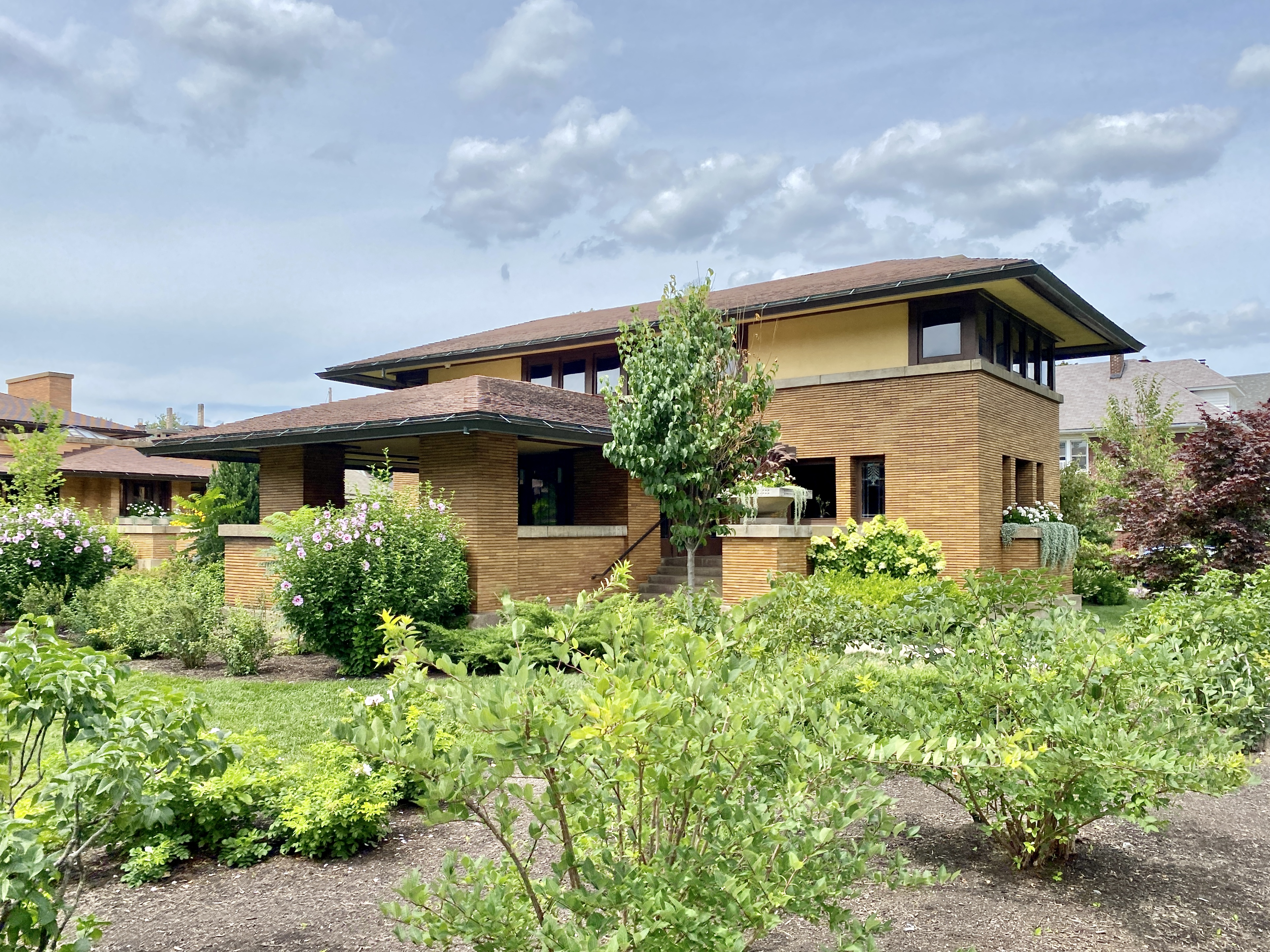
Before Wright was hired to design the Administration Building, he designed the George Barton House (pictured) for Darwin Martin.

By the early 1900s, the Larkin Company had a dozen buildings immediately south of the Administration Building's future site, two of which held the office staff. Darwin Martin and his brother William went to Oak Park, Illinois, in September 1902 in an attempt to meet with the architect Frank Lloyd Wright; they may have heard about Wright from Heath. After Darwin returned to Buffalo, William wrote a letter encouraging his brother to hire Wright to design both a new house for Darwin and a new building for the Larkin Company. Wright first visited Buffalo in November 1902, when Martin hired him to design the Barton House on the Darwin D. Martin Estate, a residential compound that also included Martin's own house. When Martin gave Wright the Barton House contract, he was reluctant to commission Wright for the other two buildings until he was satisfied with the Barton House's completion. Heath also commissioned a house of his own from Wright.

Both Martin and Heath may have helped persuade Larkin to accept Wright's selection as the Administration Building's architect; in a letter to Larkin, Martin likened a Wright-designed house to a fine Oriental rug. Wright biographer Meryle Secrest wrote that Martin wanted the Administration Building to be "a monument to himself", to the extent that Martin excluded Larkin's sons, his direct competitors, away from the development process. The Administration Building became one of several buildings designed for Martin or his family over his lifetime. (Note: Sources disagree on whether 11 or 15 were constructed. Brendan Gill writes that nine major buildings were constructed for the Martins, including the Martin, Barton, and gardener's house at the Martin estate, but excluding the pergola, conservatory, or carriage house.) It was also one of several major designs created by Wright and his employees in the 1900s, along with the Dana–Thomas House, Robie House, and Unity Temple. The Larkin Company also commissioned Wright to design row houses for its workers, which were never built.

==== Design and construction ====
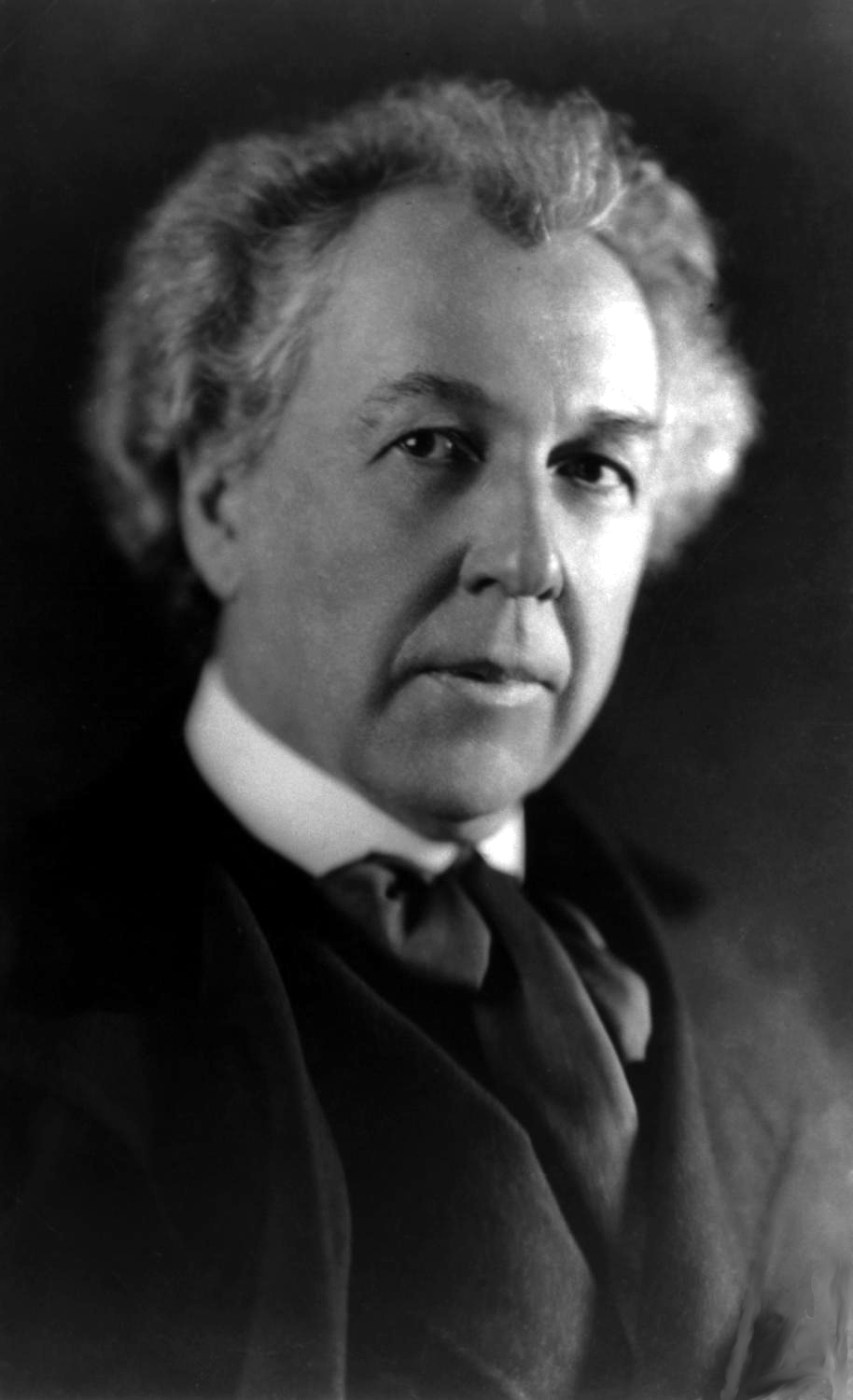
Frank Lloyd Wright (pictured in later years) drew up plans for the Administration Building primarily between January 1903 and April 1904.

The Larkin Company provided a $4 million budget for the Administration Building, (Note: Equivalent to $120.3 million in 2025) which was developed simultaneously with the Martin and Barton houses. Wright drew up plans for the Administration Building primarily between January 1903 and April 1904, although many of his drawings were undated. From the start, Wright envisioned a building with offices surrounding a central light court, in a manner similar to an atrium. In early 1903, Martin and Wright met to discuss early plans for the Administration Building, where Wright suggested using magnesite and incorporating an atrium similar to those of Chicago's Marshall Field and Company Building. Martin wrote to Larkin that March, complaining that the initial plan was "utterly inadequate to convey to us any proper sense of his meaning". Wright's early drawings had, at that stage, already envisioned a six-story main building and a shorter annex. Wright hired several employees to assist, tasking Cecil Bryan, Barry Byrne, William Drummond, and Andrew Willatsen with the detailed drawings.

Wright experimented with some of the building's materials, including magnesite, at his Oak Park studio. Wright's original concept called for the entrance to be in the annex, but he later relocated the entrance to a smaller pavilion wedged between the larger main building and the annex. Wright convinced the Larkin Company to move the staircases to freestanding towers at each corner of the building, to be used for both air intakes and communications. Larkin subsequently gave Wright an extra $30,000 to build these features. (Note: Equivalent to $902,000 in 2025) In conjunction with the addition of stair towers, Wright moved the proposed annex from the western elevation to the eastern elevation, away from the railroad tracks. By early 1904, Wright had finalized the design of the stair towers' exteriors.

Paul Mueller, a Chicago-based contractor who had collaborated with Wright on several projects, was hired to construct the Administration Building in April 1904. Plans for the building were filed with the Buffalo city government the next month. That October, two laborers died and three were injured when a construction derrick at the site collapsed. In addition, work was interrupted in 1905 when electricians went on strike to protest the employment of non-unionized electricians; several other labor unions organized a strike in solidarity with the striking electricians. The building opened in late 1906, although work was still ongoing in early 1907. Ultimately, the building cost over $1 million.

=== Larkin usage ===
==== 1900s to 1920s ====
Initially, the Administration Building accommodated about 1,800 workers. The building was used mostly by the Larkin Company's mail order departments and administrative offices. Other functions, such as advertising and production, were housed in other buildings. Ten groups, which handled mail from states east of the Mississippi River, worked at the Administration Building; mail from other parts of the US was handled by a branch office. Mail was delivered to the basement from on Swan Street and transported to the third floor's mail department. Messengers delivered the mail to the respective state group, where it was addressed accordingly. Customer information was recorded on cards and placed in the storage cabinets. Customer complaints and questions were recorded on graphophones, which were stored in the basement and taken to Buffalo's main post office. The historian Zeynep Çelik Alexander wrote that, although the building was intended to accommodate a high degree of flexibility, the company's workflow was unnecessarily complex, inadvertently hastening the building's eventual demise.

According to Wright's apprentice Edgar Tafel, Wright was so proud of the design features that, while showing visitors around the building, he once entered a busy women's restroom and cried out, "There it is! The first wall-hung water closet!" The Larkin Company periodically invited guest lecturers to give speeches in the light court. The company also provided other incentives to the building's employees, such as clubs and picnics, and provided ample amenities for the largely-female staff. Nonetheless, the Larkin Company wanted the building's design to encourage employees to focus on their jobs. The historian Reyner Banham also wrote that, despite Wright's attempts at a technologically advanced design, it suffered from defects. Decorations and glass sometimes fell from the roof, reportedly killing two employees. The building's magnesite surfaces were prone to cracking, the fifth-floor restaurant was hard to heat, and other design details broke under the weight of furniture.

By the 1910s, the company had 21 buildings and was selling over 600 products and 1,700 premiums. At the time, it was fulfilling about 10,000 daily orders and was shipping out premiums as varied as fine glass, stoves, and watches. The Larkin Company, despite its dissatisfaction over the cost overruns during the building's construction, gradually began using the building to advertise its business. The company's success did not last; as early as 1919, Martin observed that women employees tended to leave within three years of being hired. John Larkin donated a pipe organ to the building in 1925 to celebrate the company's 50th anniversary. Afterward, organ concerts were periodically held in the building, and in 1928, the Larkin Company began broadcasting the building's organ concerts over radio.

==== 1930s and early 1940s: Conversion to store ====
The Administration Building continued to be used as such through the 1930s, when the mail order business was in decline. Secrest wrote that the building had "already been substantially altered, and defaced" by that decade. The Larkin Company was near insolvency, and in 1938, the company contemplated moving its offices into the neighboring Larkin Terminal Warehouse and giving the Administration Building to the city government. The Larkin Company formed a real-estate subsidiary in 1939 to take over its properties, and it repurchased the Administration Building from this subsidiary. Larkin Company subsidiary Larkin Store Corporation agreed to lease the building and began renovating it into a retail store in September 1939. This acquisition cost the Larkin Store about $1 million (Note: Equivalent to $18.1 million in 2025) and allowed the store to expand its selling space by about 25%.

In November 1939, the Larkin Store moved its retail department into the Administration Building from the warehouse. The interior was renovated with new windows and decor. The lower three stories were used to display merchandise, while the fourth and fifth stories accommodated a scaled-down mail order department. Linens, draperies, towels, sheets, bedspreads, and similar merchandise was displayed on the first floor, and furniture was displayed on the second floor. Organ music continued to be played. In 1941, the globes above the building's piers were removed because of concerns that they were too heavy for the structure. Meanwhile, the Larkin Company continued to spin off parts of its business to repay its debts. This included selling off the other Larkin buildings in the neighborhood.

=== Decline and abandonment ===
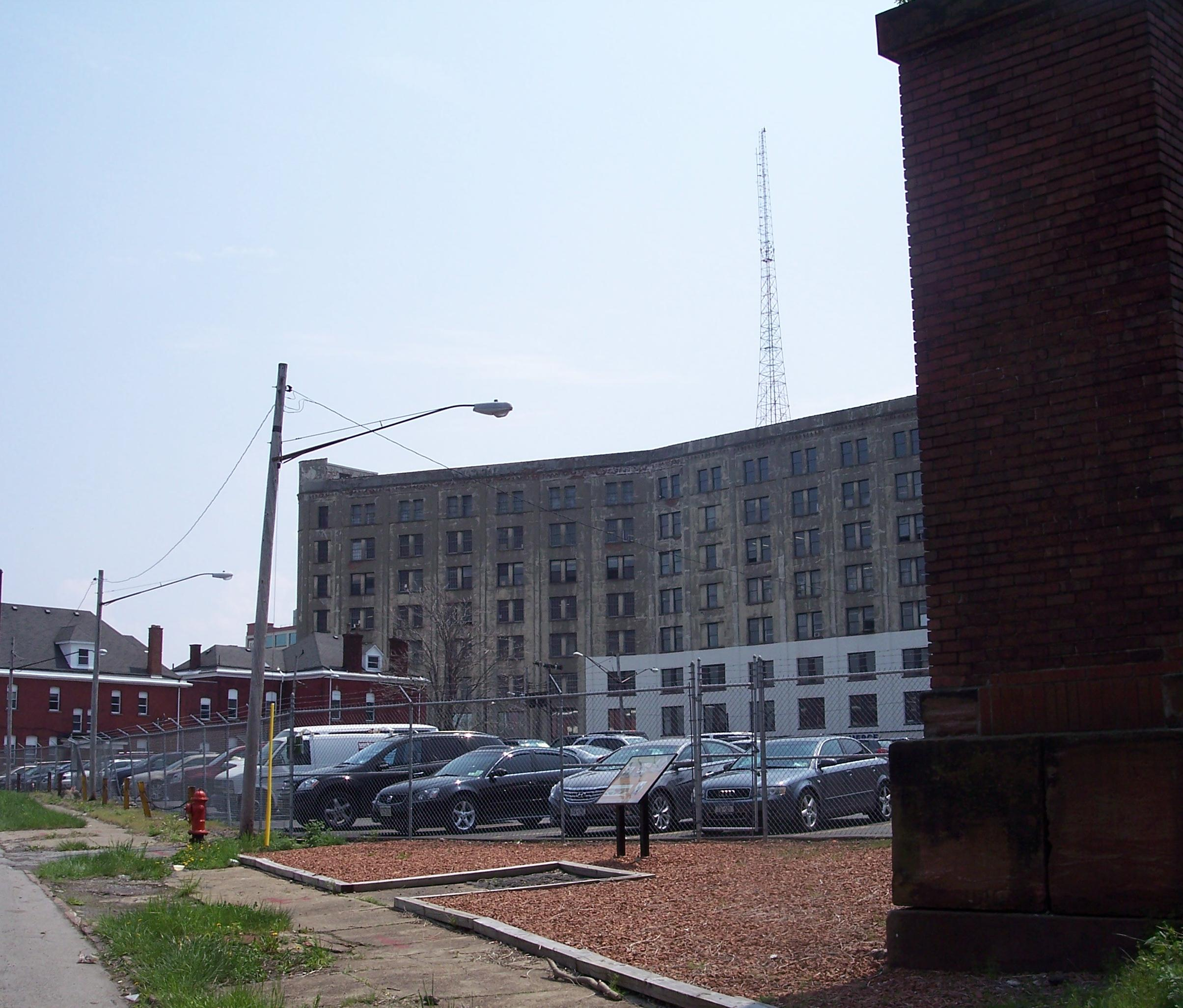
Site of the Larkin Administration Building

By 1943, all of the Larkin Company's other assets had been sold off to pay off debts. That year, the Larkin Company was forced to sell the Larkin Administration Building, having owed $85,000 in back taxes on the property. (Note: Equivalent to $1,263,000 in 2025) A contractor, L.B. Smith of Harrisburg, Pennsylvania, agreed that May to buy the building, including the organ. With the building's sale, the Larkin Company was able to remain solvent. The Larkin Store's lease remained in effect until February 1944, nine months later. Smith had believed he could claim a tax break on the building, and he considered allowing the United States Department of War to occupy it However, the federal government denied the tax break.

The plans to reuse the Administration Building never materialized, and the building was abandoned. As the building sat unused, trespassers removed 20 short tons (18 long tons; 18 t) of copper and broke all the windows. Weather and pigeons caused further damage. By 1945, the back taxes had increased to $104,616, (Note: Equivalent to $1,481,000 in 2025) and the Buffalo government foreclosed on the Larkin Administration Building that year. The same year, the Herman L. Schlicker Organ Company bought the vandalized Moller organ and removed it. In the year after the city's takeover, George Wanamaker, the city comptroller, received an offer to purchase the building for $26,000, (Note: Equivalent to $368,000 in 2025) which he rejected as too low. At the time, the building was assessed at $240,000. (Note: Equivalent to $3,398,000 in 2025) In May 1946, the New York State Education Department considered using the building as a technical institute.

With no viable attempts to reuse the building forthcoming, Wanamaker suggested advertising the building in several major newspapers, including The New York Times and The Wall Street Journal, in November 1946. Wanamaker also implied that the building could be subdivided into apartments. Advertisements for the building began running in several American newspapers in January 1947, but the city received no offers in three months. During this time, a squatter inside the abandoned building was found dead after catching pneumonia. That April, an unidentified manufacturing firm offered to purchase an option to buy the building for $25,000; (Note: Equivalent to $283,000 in 2025) this option lapsed without being executed. City officials also approached the New York state and Erie County governments, gauging their interest in using the building. The state government declined the city's offer. Although the county's board of supervisors did express interest in converting the Administration Building into offices, it never finalized its plans.

By that October, the Buffalo Evening News wrote that building was in unusable condition, with all its remaining windows broken and its fences and gates damaged or missing. One source recounted that all standalone fixtures in the building, including doorknobs and lamps, had already been plundered. Several other buyers in 1948 acquired options to buy the building, but none of these options were executed. Among the option holders were the brewery manager Magnus P. Benzing, who let his option lapse after failing to come up with a suitable use for the building. In April 1949, city councilman Joseph Dudzick proposed using the building as an athletic center, but this plan did not progress further.

=== Demolition ===
In August 1949, the Hunt Business Agency offered to buy the building for $5,000 on behalf of an anonymous client. (Note: Equivalent to $54,000 in 2025) The city government accepted the offer before even learning the buyer's identity, (Note: Equivalent to $54,000 in 2025) contingent on the buyer clearing the site and building a new structure there. The buyer, Western Trading Corporation, then announced plans to replace the Larkin Administration Building with a truck stop, and the sale was finalized that October. After Western Trading formally took title to the building in January 1950, demolition began the next month. Morris & Reimann was hired to demolish the building, amid widespread opposition to the demolition. Due to the extremely heavy materials used inside the building, demolition proceeded slowly, and the slabs had to be cut into pieces. A demolition worker was seriously injured that August when a portion of the building collapsed unexpectedly, trapping him under rubble.

Demolition was completed by July 1950, five months after work started. (Note: One source says it took six months to demolish the building; however, February to July is a five-month span.) Although Morris & Reimann had been paid $55,000 for the demolition contract, (Note: Equivalent to $583,000 in 2025) it made hardly any profit, as most of this amount was used to pay demolition workers' wages. In May 1951, the Western Trading Corporation filed plans for a truck terminal and office building at the Larkin site. If built, the terminal would have been a two-story structure with an L-shaped floor plan costing about $150,000–200,000. (Note: Equivalent to $1.6–2.1 million in 2025) That November, the Western Trading Corporation requested the Buffalo Common Council's permission to build its truck stop on another site. Western Trading stated that 60 companies' staff and clients would have nowhere to park if the Larkin site were developed, and the Common Council approved the request, provided the Larkin site was properly paved and graded. This left the Larkin site without any tenant.

The Larkin Administration Building is among the approximately 25% of Wright's work that has since been demolished. The demolition of the Larkin Administration Building came just as Buffalo's population reached its peak, and when post–World War II development in the city was well underway. Local magazine Business First retrospectively wrote that the building's demolition was followed by a long era of "official indifference to Buffalo's history and physical appearance". Wright reportedly expressed less concern about its demolition than about the perception that the building had been "too severe for the fundamentalist English tastes of the Larkin family". According to his biographer Brendan Gill, he may have been annoyed that the Larkin family had never commissioned a house from him. Gill also wrote that Wright had taken pride in how cumbersome the building had been to demolish. In 1978, the writer Jerome Puma said that "memories barely survive" of the Larkin Administration Building, given that the local news media had not published any articles about the building since 1965.

== Architecture ==
The Larkin Administration Building was designed by Frank Lloyd Wright with decorations by Richard Bock. Marion Mahony Griffin is sometimes credited with designing decorative features, though her involvement was minimal if at all. The building consisted of a main office and an annex, separated by a shorter entrance pavilion; the entrance was sometimes classified as part of the annex. The building's architecture was part of the Larkin Company's corporate identity, as was the case with many American manufacturers of the time. Although other companies generally built either expansive industrial complexes or office towers, the Administration Building was neither; the historian Jack Quinan wrote that the building was instead distinguished by its geometric architectural details.

The Administration Building was Wright's first major commercial design, for which he eschewed the Prairie style of his previous residential works, instead taking inspiration from his onetime mentor Louis Sullivan. The design was based loosely on the Abraham Lincoln Center, which Wright had designed in 1897. The Lincoln design had in turn been influenced by Sullivan's Wainwright Building, although it was not ultimately built to Wright's specifications. Wright's original Lincoln design incorporated several details that he later included in the design of the Administration Building and Unity Temple, such as load-bearing piers, corner staircases, balconies surrounding a tall light court, and clerestory windows providing indirect natural light from above. According to Quinan, the Administration Building's appearance was likely also influenced by the grain elevators that formerly existed in the neighborhood. The geometric style differed significantly from the Beaux-Arts office buildings that predominated at the time.

The building incorporated many novel details, including double-glazed materials, wall-mounted toilets, magnesite fireproofing, and subfloor utilities. The amenities, such as a library, classroom, and lounges, were also atypical for the time and were intended to entice women employees. The Administration Building used little ornamentation, except on the exterior piers and interior light courts. There were numerous inscriptions of various words and adages both outside and inside. PBS described Wright's extensive involvement in the building as signifying his "interest in the built environment as a fully-designed work of art". Quinan wrote that Wright had tried to design the building as an idealized workspace and that he wanted employees to learn "that work well done is inherently edifying", rather than mere "mindless drudgery".

=== Exterior ===
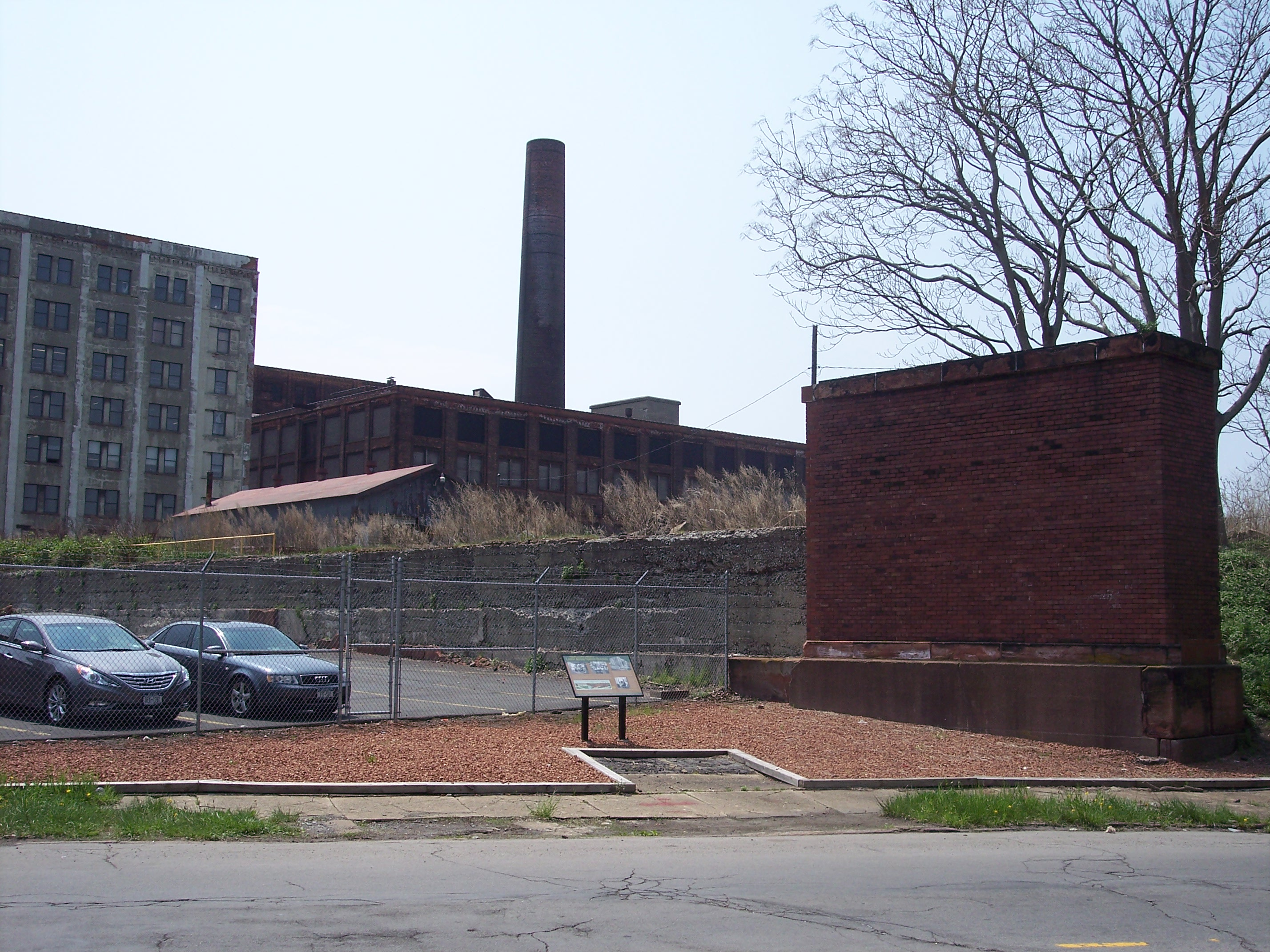
The brickwork was the same color as that of the remaining pier (right).

The main building was six and a half stories high, including the ground-level basement. (Note: For a diagram of the floor levels in relation to each other, see Quinan 1987, p. 65.) The annex, measuring five stories high including the basement, rose to the ceiling of the main building's third story; it extended off the main building's eastern elevation, providing space for ancillary functions. The entrance pavilion was placed between the main building and the annex. Above the entrance pavilion's second story, there was a gap between the main building and annex. The massing was similar to the "Chicago quarter block" designs Wright had designed under Sullivan in the 1890s. Wright had perceived the building's angularity as carrying a certain masculinity, as opposed to the "feminine" curves of his later Johnson Wax Headquarters.

==== Facade ====
The building had a stark brick facade, leading Wright to describe it as a "simple cliff of brick hermetically sealed". To blend in with the industrial nature of neighboring buildings, the brickwork was dark red, while the mortar between the bricks was pink. Exterior details were executed in red sandstone; the entrance doors, windows, and skylights were of glass, and there was concrete trim at the top and bottom of the facade. The basement received sunlight from the main building's light court and from windows punched into the foundation walls. Above that, the exterior windows were double-layered and each had a central pane flanked by two smaller ones. The windows were clerestories, raised 7.5 feet (2.3 m) above the floor slabs, both to provide space for cabinets inside and to block workers' views of surrounding industrial buildings.

The main building had large stair towers at each corner, which were articulated, or stylized, to give the impression of pylons or vertical piers. Narrow vertical glass strips separated the stair towers from the adjacent expanses of brick wall. On the narrower northern and southern elevations, there were two narrow piers between the two wide stair towers. The narrow piers each held air-exhaust ducts and served no structural purpose. The tops of the narrow piers were ornamented with sculptural groupings consisting of putti and globes. Each grouping contained two putti flanking a scroll with the word "Larkin", above which rose a globe measuring 6 feet (1.8 m) across. There were additional load-bearing piers on each elevation, the capitals of which bore incised motifs of chevrons branching off a central shaft.

The eastern elevation had a forecourt with fountains embedded into the annex's walls. The fountains were designed to resemble waterfalls and were placed one story above ground on both Swan and Seneca streets. Above and behind the fountains were bas-reliefs. Each bas-relief contained an 8-by-8-foot (2.4 by 2.4 m) panel depicting two figures (each personifying a virtue). Each pair of figures flanked an ornamented globe above a panel with an inscribed quote or motto. One inscription read, HONEST LABOR NEEDS NO MASTER; SIMPLE JUSTICE NEEDS NO SLAVES, and faced Seneca Street. On Swan Street, another inscription read, FREEDOM TO EVERY MAN AND COMMERCE WITH ALL THE WORLD.

Visitors were funneled through the entrance pavilion before entering either of the two larger structures. Wright had previously used such an entrance design in his Oak Park home and studio, and the design was an example of the compression and release technique that Wright included in his other works. The entrance pavilion had doors to the north and south, accessed by stairs ascending from street level, next to the fountains. Large glass doors—a novelty for the time, but commonplace elsewhere—provided illumination to the lobby. There was an arch on Swan Street, where a ramp led to the basement.

==== Roofs ====
The roof had a brick-paved recreation area for employees. The stair towers were capped by skylights, and there was a larger skylight above the main building's central light court. A separate skylight was placed over the annex's light court, which abutted that of the main building. The upper floors of both the main building and the annex also received natural light from windows overlooking the short entrance pavilion. The annex was supposed to include a roof garden, but for unknown reasons, this was not built.

=== Mechanical features ===
In addition to overseeing the overall design, Wright oversaw the design of the utility systems. The mechanical equipment serving the Larkin Administration Building was located in a nearby property.

It is interesting that I, an architect supposed to be concerned with the aesthetic sense of the building, should have invented the hung wall for the w.c. (easier to clean under), and adopted many other innovations like the glass door, steel furniture, air-conditioning and radiant or 'gravity heat'. Nearly every technological innovation used today was suggested in the Larkin Building in 1904.

— Frank Lloyd Wright, quoted by Edgar Kaufmann Jr., editor. An American Architecture, pp. 137–138.

==== Air and water circulation ====
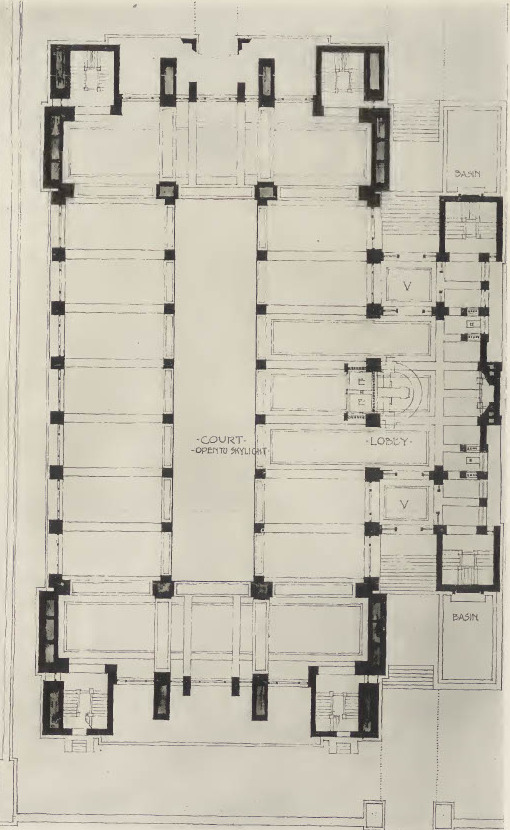
Interior floor plan

Due to the presence of the nearby railroads, Wright needed a way to prevent soot and debris from entering the Administration Building. His specifications for the building dictated that the interior maintain a temperature of 70 °F (21 °C) and a humidity of 70% year-round. As such, the air circulation system included an early form of air conditioning, which made the building one of the United States' first air-conditioned industrial buildings. As detailed in Wright's specifications, the building was also required to include an "air purifying and cooling apparatus" with four heating–cooling units. This apparatus had to be capable of cooling water to 50 °F (10 °C). A refrigeration unit—which introduced water into the air before cooling and reheating it—was included in Wright's specifications for the building and was installed no later than 1907.

Throughout the Administration Building's existence, Wright and observers such as Russell Sturgis gave conflicting indications as to the nature of the air circulation system. After the building was demolished, the only evidence of the air circulation system's operations was a series of drawings, which were initially misinterpreted. In 1969, the scholar Reyner Banham wrote that the building was initially fitted with a relatively simple passive-cooling system prior to 1909, but that the system never had humidity control. Banham wrote that, based on the drawings, it had been assumed that air had risen through the piers on the facade.

Subsequent scholarship by Banham found that the Administration Building had an active ventilation system, with fans that directly helped exhaust air. Intake and exhaust openings were both placed on the roof, but the air intake and water filtering equipment were in the basement. After air was taken into the building, it was distributed vertically through riser ducts embedded into piers spread through the building's interior. The air was then distributed horizontally through ducts embedded into the beams under each floor, as well as through the balcony fronts facing the light court. Registers, or openings, were placed throughout the beams and balcony fronts to distribute the air throughout the rooms. Air was exhausted through additional registers near the floor, then through ventilation shafts embedded in the corner towers. Wright's specifications for the building indicate that the floor openings were to have been used only during the winter; during the summer, air would have been exhausted through the ceiling. Later in the building's existence, blinds were installed over the windows.

==== Other features ====
The presence of the main building's light court was intended to reduce the need for artificial lighting. Although workers primarily received illumination in the form of natural light entering through the windows, there were also Nernst glowers throughout the building. These lights were installed on the piers surrounding the main building's light court, and on the ceiling above the typewriter operators' offices on the second floor. There was single- and triple-phase alternating-current equipment.

To make it easier to clean restrooms, the toilets were hung from the walls, then a novel design feature. The partitions between toilets were also hung from the walls. Wright wrote for The Larkin Idea: "If ideal sanitary conditions and toilet facilities are worth 'money' we have those—perfect." There was a clock in the lobby's information desk, which controlled all the other clocks in the building. A vacuum system was used to clean the building after hours.

=== Interior ===
Wright arranged the main building's and annex's interior spaces to optimize employee efficiency. The interiors were grouped around two light courts—one each in the main building and the annex—in a similar manner to other binuclear (double-centered) designs that Wright used for other public buildings throughout his lifetime. The main building's relatively high outer walls and central light court created well-lit, open plan spaces that were nonetheless self-enclosed. Staircases were placed in the stair towers at the main building's corners, away from the workspaces surrounding the light court. Arquitectura Viva described this arrangement as a forerunner to the architectural concept of served and servant spaces. There were also two elevators.

John Larkin, who had been in Chicago during the 1871 Great Chicago Fire, had mandated that the building be fireproof. As such, the building was made of a steel frame with brick finishes, which were cream-colored. The reinforced concrete floor slabs measured 10 inches (250 mm) thick and 17 by 34 feet (5.2 by 10.4 m) across, resting on 24-inch-thick (61 cm) steel girders. The concrete slabs were covered with a magnesite–wood mixture, which was itself covered by a magnesite floor surface. Other finishes throughout were made of sound-absorbing magnesite, and the material was also used as decorations and trim. The magnesite was mined in Greece and was molded into simple motifs. The building had few interior partitions or walls, limiting the volume of flammable material. In The Larkin Idea, Wright extolled "the positive security insured by the use of permanent fireproof materials throughout" the building.

==== Main building ====
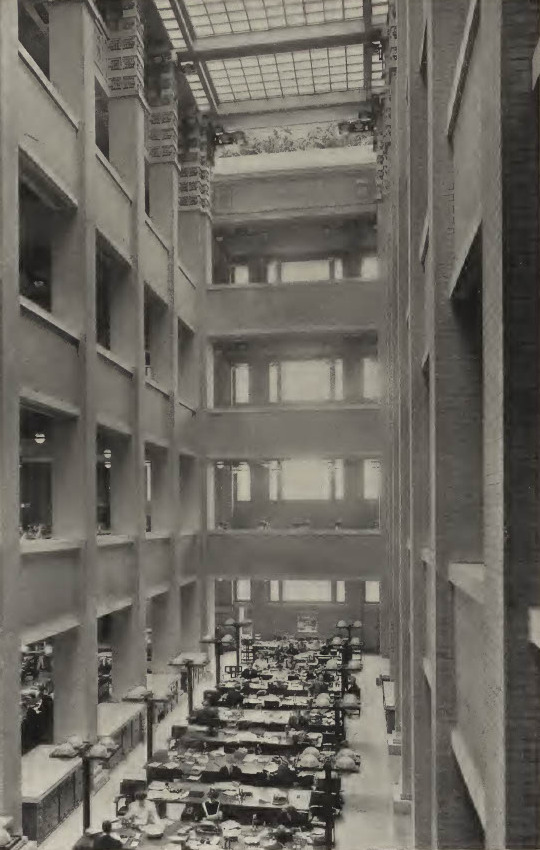
Light court in the main building

The main building's light court rose the building's full height, measuring 76 feet (23 m) high to the skylight. The five upper levels had balconies overlooking the light court, giving the appearance of an atrium. The piers around the light court were arranged in two rows, corresponding to the narrow piers on the northern and southern elevations, and were placed 16 feet (4.9 m) apart, the same as the ceiling height. At the fifth floor, the balcony fronts overlooking the light court bore fourteen groups of three philosophical themes each, such as GENEROSITY / ALTRUISM / SACRIFICE, INTEGRITY / LOYALTY / FIDELITY, and IMAGINATION / JUDGEMENT / INITIATIVE. Quotes from the Sermon on the Mount were carved across the short dimensions of the fifth-floor balconies. On the same floor, the piers had ornamented capitals. Quinan described the light court's capitals, inscriptions, skylight, and other decorations as exemplifying the "aspiration of all matter to a spiritual ideal", a belief espoused by the philosopher Ralph Waldo Emerson.

The basement included machinery and service spaces, such as a garage and elevator equipment. On the first (main) floor were the executive offices; this was atypical of corporate headquarters in the US, which tended to be on the top floors of buildings. The Larkin Company directors' room and the Larkin family members' offices were at the south end of the floor. Martin's and Heath's departments occupied the center of the light court and the northeast end of the first floor. Secretarial and management offices were on the northwest side of the floor, and the cashier's and accounting department were to the southeast, next to the Larkins' offices. When the Larkin Store opened in the building, interior windows were installed between the light court's piers at ground level, and the rest of the ground level was split into three display rooms.

Mail, typing, and sales offices were located on the upper floors, which had ceilings of 16 feet (4.9 m). The Larkin Company's mail department was originally divided into ten groups, housed on the first through fourth floors. Mail from customers was delivered to the third floor. The balcony fronts were 3 feet (0.91 m) high. When the Larkin Store opened, the second floor was converted into three more display rooms, the third floor became merchandising space, and the top two stories hosted the mail-order department.

A dining space was placed on the main building's fifth floor, the highest full story in the structure. A 100-rank Möller pipe organ was housed in the central court, at the dining level. The organ had 7,930 pipes measuring between 3/8 inch (9.5 mm) and 32 feet (9.8 m) long, which were capable of replicating the sounds of various instruments. Above were conservatories, which housed the bakery and kitchen in separate mezzanines. These conservatories contained a variety of plants.

==== Annex ====
The annex spanned 2,200 square feet (200 m^{2}). It had amenity spaces such as a lounge, locker rooms, restrooms, and a classroom, along with a Buffalo Public Library branch. Despite rising only to the ceiling of the main building's third story, the annex had five floor levels, plus a mezzanine. The annex spaces were arranged around their own light court, which ascended 37 feet (11 m) from the ground. The basement, first, and second stories of the annex and main building were connected. The two upper stories were at separate levels from the main building, as the annex had substantially lower ceilings.

The lobby had a semicircular reception desk and an elevator bank on the western wall. Passageways flanked the reception desk, leading directly to the main building's light court. Opposite the reception desk, on the eastern wall, were a fireplace and balcony. Bock and Wright designed bas reliefs flanking the fireplace, including a depiction of the mythical goddess Aurora with inscriptions beneath her outstretched arms. Wright had also planned another panel above the fireplace, which was never installed.

The annex's second story was not well photographed, but it had men's and women's locker rooms and restrooms, with an elevator landing protruding into these spaces. The locker rooms could be accessed directly from the main building, but to discourage excessive use of the locker rooms, Wright placed this passageway between two desks. The third story measured 10 feet (3.0 m) high and had a lounge with Wright-designed furniture and a fireplace, along with several emergency shelter rooms. A mezzanine, slightly below the annex's third story, jutted into the main building, creating a visitor balcony. The fourth story measured 8 feet (2.4 m) high and included classrooms, the library branch, and a YWCA. Other amenities included an infirmary, savings bank for employees, and law library.

==== Furniture ====
Wright designed much of the furniture, which was so heavy that it caused cracks on the floor surfaces. The building had metal furniture made by the Van Dorn Iron Works, an Ohio firm. The metal furniture, which included four types of chairs and five types of desks, was the last metal furniture Wright designed until he was commissioned to create the Johnson Wax Headquarters' furniture over three decades later. The Administration Building also included some all-wooden furniture, including chairs for its restaurant. Most of the furniture was intended to be movable and modular, accommodating highly flexible office layouts, though in practice this introduced largely unnecessary complexity to the Larkin Company's operation. Wright was mostly satisfied with the furniture but lamented that he had been unable to execute the wastebaskets and telephone booths he had designed for the building.

The building had metal-framed cabinets, placed beneath the clerestory windows. Additional cabinets were placed next to the balcony fronts; these were arranged so that a master key could open multiple drawers. The cabinets housed a card catalog system, with labels bearing information about customer accounts, and the sides and top surfaces of the cabinets were covered in magnesite. Files in the cabinets were stored vertically, and the cabinets themselves had interchangeable drawers that could be taken out, swapped with others, or put back.

Desks also had magnesite surfaces, and were designed in three general styles, each for different levels of company's staff hierarchy. Type A desks seated four executives and two secretaries each, with drawers for graphophones and typewriters. Chief clerks used type B desks, with movable seats and typewriter tables, while regular clerks used type C desks, which had graphophone openings and minimal storage. The desks had caster wheels and could interlock. For the dining room, Wright designed tables, which could each fit eight people and could be used as seats if necessary. To encourage a more egalitarian seating pattern, Wright placed posts at the narrow ends of each dining table, preventing people from sitting at the head of the table.

Some metal chairs were attached to the desks and cantilevered above the floor to make floor-cleaning easier. The cantilevered chairs had leather or wood upholstery and could fold inward. Wright also manufactured standalone cast iron chairs, which originally had three legs; these chairs tended to tip over and were nicknamed the "suicide chair". Two types of armchair were also commissioned, with perforated seatbacks that could be folded.

Wheeled Larkin desk chair (1903), Museum of Applied Art (MAKK)

Larkin highback chair (1903), Museum of Applied Art (MAKK)

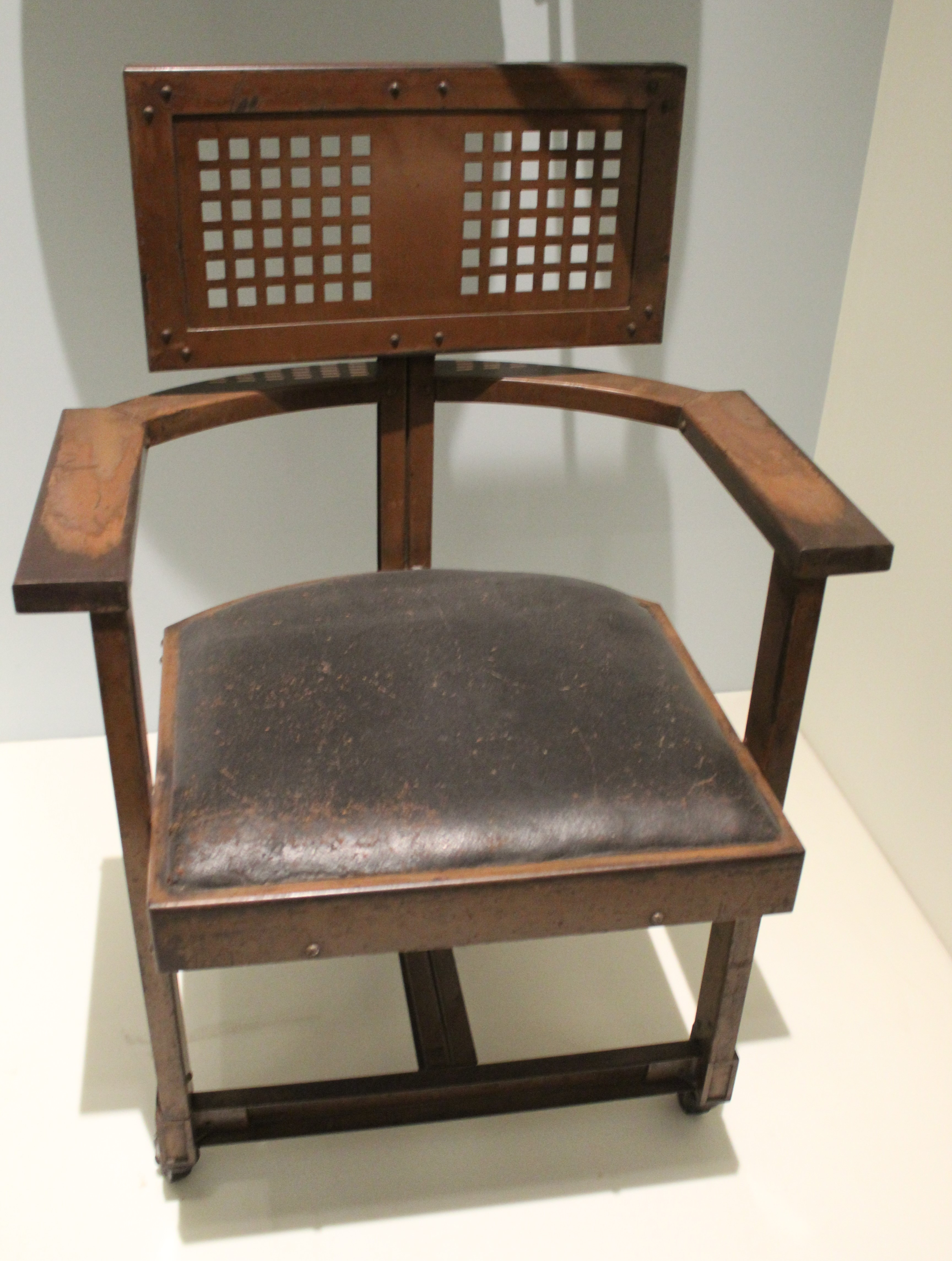
Larkin Chair (1904)

== Impact and legacy ==
=== Site and remnants ===
Debris from the site was used as fill and dumped into the Ohio Canal Basin, which was converted into Thomas Conway Park. Fine details, such as the wall-mounted toilets, disappeared without any documentation as to their final disposition. Some of the windows were preserved and sold off, and a mural from the Larkin Administration Building exists in the Larkin Terminal Warehouse (later the LCo Building). Richard Bock, who sculpted the building's decorations, kept a plaster model of the detailing that was used in the building. Extensive Larkin Company records and photographs survive in the library collection of the Buffalo History Museum, and the Frank Lloyd Wright Foundation has 161 drawings of the Larkin Administration Building.

A single brick pier, abutting the nearby railroad embankment, was one of the few features of Wright's building that remained after demolition. This pier was part of the building's perimeter wall and measures about 25 feet (7.6 m) long and 16 feet (4.9 m) high, using the same materials as the rest of the building. Brendan Gill, a Wright biographer and an architecture critic, retrospectively wrote that the pier "explains much about the exterior appearance of the building" and was still worth visiting. The rest of the site has remained a parking lot, with a marker and an illustrated educational panel. Remnants of the building may exist under the parking lot. Neighboring buildings of the Larkin complex, such as the LCo Building, remained in use and were sold to other companies.

A commemorative plaque was rediscovered on a neighboring plot in the early 2000s. During the decade, several Wright fans began raising $5,135 to spruce up the remaining pier and add a commemorative plaque on the building's site. This project entailed cleaning the pier and moving it away from the street. At the time, fans of Wright's work still visited the pier on their trips to Buffalo. The pier was in such poor shape that preservationists feared that it would fall apart after a few more harsh winters. The pier was rededicated in August 2003, and a pocket park was dedicated next to the pier in 2006, in commemoration of the building's centennial. In 2015, the Larkin Center of Commerce erected a glass pier at the Seneca Street side of the wall.

=== Reception ===
==== 1900s: Initial commentary ====
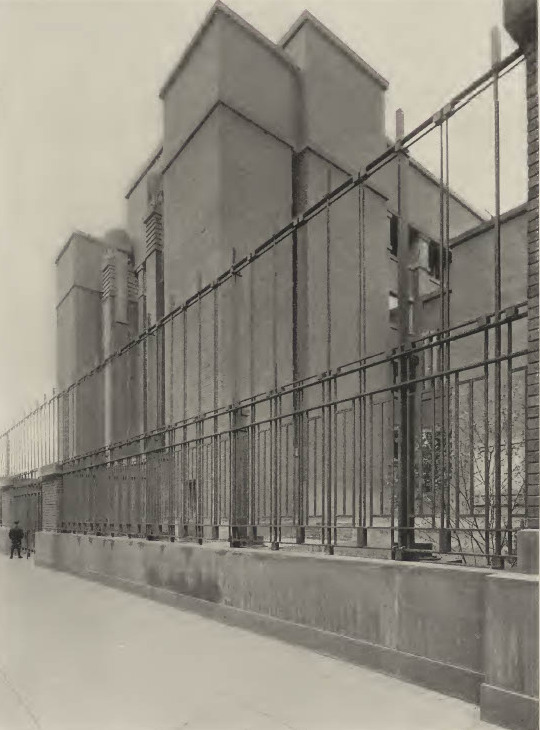
Wright's favorite vantage points of the Administration Building were diagonally outside the corner towers, where the building's sharp angles and two elevations were visible.

In the building's first seven years, most publications about the building were written or published by the Larkin Company itself. When the building was completed, Wright was invited to write an article for the company newsletter The Larkin Idea, justifying the great expenses and the various details of the design. Despite later extensive scholarship into Wright's work, this article remained the most detailed account of the building. Wright called his own building the Larkin Company's "brains and nervous system", intended to optimize the company's operations. He wrote for the Architectural Record that the building "is a simple, dignified utterance of a plain, utilitarian type". Wright had intended for the building to be seen from the streets directly adjoining it and, as such, was dissatisfied with photographs taken from elevated viewpoints. His favorite vantage points were diagonally outside the corner towers, where the building's sharp angles and two elevations were visible; he referred to one image from this vantage point as indicating the "grammar of the protestant".

The Administration Building attracted attention from around the world. The first non-Larkin source about the building was a July 1907 Inland Architect and News Record article, which found the stair towers and the spacious light court to be stylistically incompatible. The Architectural Review, by contrast, considered the Administration Building "about as fine a piece of original composition as one could expect to find". The Buffalo Courier Express called the building "massive, but not forbidding". Wright's fellow architects also generally praised the building. Much of this praise came from European architects until the 1920s, when American modernist architects began paying the Administration Building more attention. Dutch architect H. P. Berlage said: "The two things that impressed me most during my visit to America were Wright's Larkin Building at Buffalo and Niagara Falls."

The American art critic Russell Sturgis described the Administration Building in the Architectural Record as "an extremely ugly building. It is, in fact, a monster of awkwardness, if we look at its lines and masses alone." This criticism was based on an incomplete and partially incorrect impression of the building, as Sturgis, having only seen the building in photographs, had confused the eastern and western elevations. In response, Wright angrily denied what he described as Sturgis's "murderous, wide-eyed slanders", criticizing Sturgis's more-traditional architectural tastes; the piece had reinforced Wright's long-held belief that Sturgis did not understand the architect's work. Wright's reply was not published before Sturgis's death, possibly to avoid controversy. Responding to other critics, Wright contended that the building ought to be seen as a work of art, in a similar sense to "an ocean liner, a locomotive or a battle ship".

==== 1910s to 1950s ====
Larkin Company staff had positive recollections of the building. Larkin secretary Carolyn Prather called the building "beautiful...beautiful"; Larkin artist John Mueller called it "a work of art"; and William Heath's daughter Evelyn (herself a secretary) said Wright "must have been a genius to design that building" despite her personal antipathy toward Wright. The German architect Erich Mendelsohn, visiting the building in 1924, viewed favorably the busyness of the main building's atrium. At a 1939 traveling exhibition about American architecture, the Administration Building was praised for "the boldness with which the architect cut with tradition".

Few people advocated for the building's preservation after it was abandoned, taking action only after the demolition was announced. Newspapers across the US endorsed the building's preservation, to no avail. The Buffalo Evening News ran an editorial headlined "A Shame of Our City" in 1949 (before the site was officially sold), lamenting the lackluster preservation efforts. The historian Andrew Ritchie wrote in the New York Herald Tribune that "no single building in America has had a wider influence on international industrial architecture", expressing alarm at what he saw as a lack of motivation to prevent the building's demolition. The architect J. Stanley Sharp wrote that the building "should be regarded not as an outmoded utilitarian structure but as a monument, if not to Mr. Wright's creative imagination, to the inventiveness of American design." The Baltimore Sun lamented the Larkin Administration Building's demise, writing that the demolition of a much older structure would have drawn much outcry, but "when it comes to the monuments of our own age, we tear them down without compunction".

==== 1960s to present: Retrospective ====
Retrospective observers described the building as a major influence on 20th-century architecture. The historian H. Allen Brooks classified the Administration Building as one of Wright's most significant works of the 1900s, along with the Robie House and Unity Temple in the Chicago area. Franklin Toker, one of Wright's biographers, called the Administration Building "the most important of Wright's early buildings" and predicted that Wright would have enjoyed worldwide renown even if it had been the last building he ever designed. Writing in 1987, Gill observed that the building's importance was such "one goes on speaking of it in the present tense", saying that, despite being dissonant with its surroundings, the building was an architectural symbol for its day. Reyner Banham of the University at Buffalo said the building was important because of its mechanical features, calling it one of the "world's most celebrated office buildings". Secrest said that the building was "one of the seminal works of the early modern movement", and Nicolai Ouroussoff called it one of the "great pillars of American architecture". The critic John C. Weaver said the building's design "emphasized the new power of management" by clearly separating Larkin's managerial and manufacturing departments.

Observers saw the building's demolition as inexplicable considering its significance, and characterized the Administration Building as a great architectural loss. The historian Jack Quinan likened the demolition to the destruction of an Antoni Gaudí building in Gaudí's hometown Barcelona. In the late 20th century, Banham wrote that, without the Administration Building, "Buffalo falls out of the history of modern architecture, as commonly written". The writer Paul Goldberger described it as "one of the great losses in the entire history of American architecture" in 2003, on par with the original New York Penn Station's demolition; the same year, the writer Benjamin Ivry called it "the greatest loss" among Wright designs. A writer for The Guardian said in 2016: "Many great buildings have been lost for many different reasons, but few for no good reason at all". The Administration Building's destruction inspired later efforts to save the Darwin D. Martin House.

The decorations have also received commentary. John Vinci wrote that the Administration Building and Wright's contemporary designs "look too much like fantastic block houses" and that their geometric designs lacked "grace or ease of monumental beauty". Gill wrote that the stair towers had resembled a "pagan temple". The writer Patricia Bayer said that Bock's ornamentation had softened the Administration Building's "rigid rectilinearity". Quinan wrote that, although Wright had claimed the building would be "as light as outdoors", this was not possible because of the density of the brick walls and piers. Architectural historian Vincent Scully Jr. wrote that the building's walls and piers contributed to "the splendid integration of space, structure, and massing", saying the building's severe style not only evoked industrial influences but also neoclassical late-18th-century architecture. Scully also wrote that the building was the first of Wright's "monumental spatial sequences", where he experimented with nondescript entrances leading to expansive interior spaces.

=== Media and design influences ===
Quinan wrote a book about the building in 1987, which decades later remained the most in-depth source on the building's history. After the LCo Building was acquired in 2002, the owners added an exhibit about the Larkin Administration Building there. Artifacts from the Administration Building have also been exhibited. These include a display of 24 windows at the Richard Feigen Gallery in 1968, an exhibit of furnishings at the Burchfield Art Center in 1988, and a display at the Larkin Premium Exposition. A chair from the building is also exhibited at New York City's Museum of Modern Art, and an exhibit with architectural drawings and items from the building opened at the National Center for the Study of Frank Lloyd Wright in Ann Arbor, Michigan, in 1989. Replicas of the original furniture, including tables, have been created since the building's demolition. The Larkin Building, and Wright's other Buffalo designs, were also detailed in a 1998 PBS documentary.

The design itself was largely replicated in the main branch of the Evanston (Illinois) Public Library (1994), designed by Joseph Powell. Some of the design features were used in other buildings. The atrium was similar to others that Wright had designed, ranging from the James Charnley House (1892) to the Marin County Civic Center (1962) and Solomon R. Guggenheim Museum (1959). Wright reused the concept of an environmentally controlled workroom for the Johnson Wax Administration Building (1939), which Herbert Fisk Johnson Jr. had commissioned after visiting the Administration Building. Other office buildings from the mid-20th century onward began incorporating central atriums and open-plan spaces. The circulation of mail—with most mail being delivered to the third floor and then traveling downward—was akin to the Guggenheim Museum, where visitors took elevators to the top floor and then spiraled downstairs. While the building's air conditioning system was praised, it was not widely copied, and air-conditioned office buildings in the US did not become commonplace until the mid-20th century.

== See also ==
- Architecture of Buffalo, New York
- List of Frank Lloyd Wright works
