= Dutchtown, New York =

Hamlet in New York, United States

Coordinates: 42°37′11″N 78°28′58″W

Dutchtown (Dutch: Duitsestad) is a hamlet in the town of Holland in Erie County, New York, United States. The East Branch of Cazenovia Creek flows through Dutchtown.
