= First Commonwealth Bank =

American bank and financial services company

- Type: Public
- Traded as: NYSE: FCF; S&P 600 component
- Industry: Banking and Finance
- Founded: (1857) as First Commonwealth Bank (1982) as First Commonwealth Financial Corporation
- Headquarters: Indiana, Pennsylvania, United States
- Area served: Western Pennsylvania, Central Pennsylvania, Central Ohio
- Products: Financial services
- Number of employees: 1,454
- Parent: First Commonwealth Financial Corporation
- Website: www.fcbanking.com

First Commonwealth Financial Corporation is a financial services company based in Indiana, Pennsylvania, primarily serving the Western and Central Pennsylvania as well as Canton, Ohio and Columbus, Ohio.

First Commonwealth has long served the Central Pennsylvania region, but began aggressively expanding into the Western part of the state in the early 2000s (decade), particularly Pittsburgh. In 2016, the bank purchased several Ohio-based banks growing its footprint. It is currently the fifth-largest bank in the Pittsburgh metropolitan area behind PNC Financial Services, Citizens Financial Group, First Niagara Bank, and privately held Dollar Bank.

First Commonwealth is one of the few stronger banks that did not accept TARP funds in 2008.
