= Larkin Terminal Warehouse =

Building in Buffalo, New York

- LCo Building
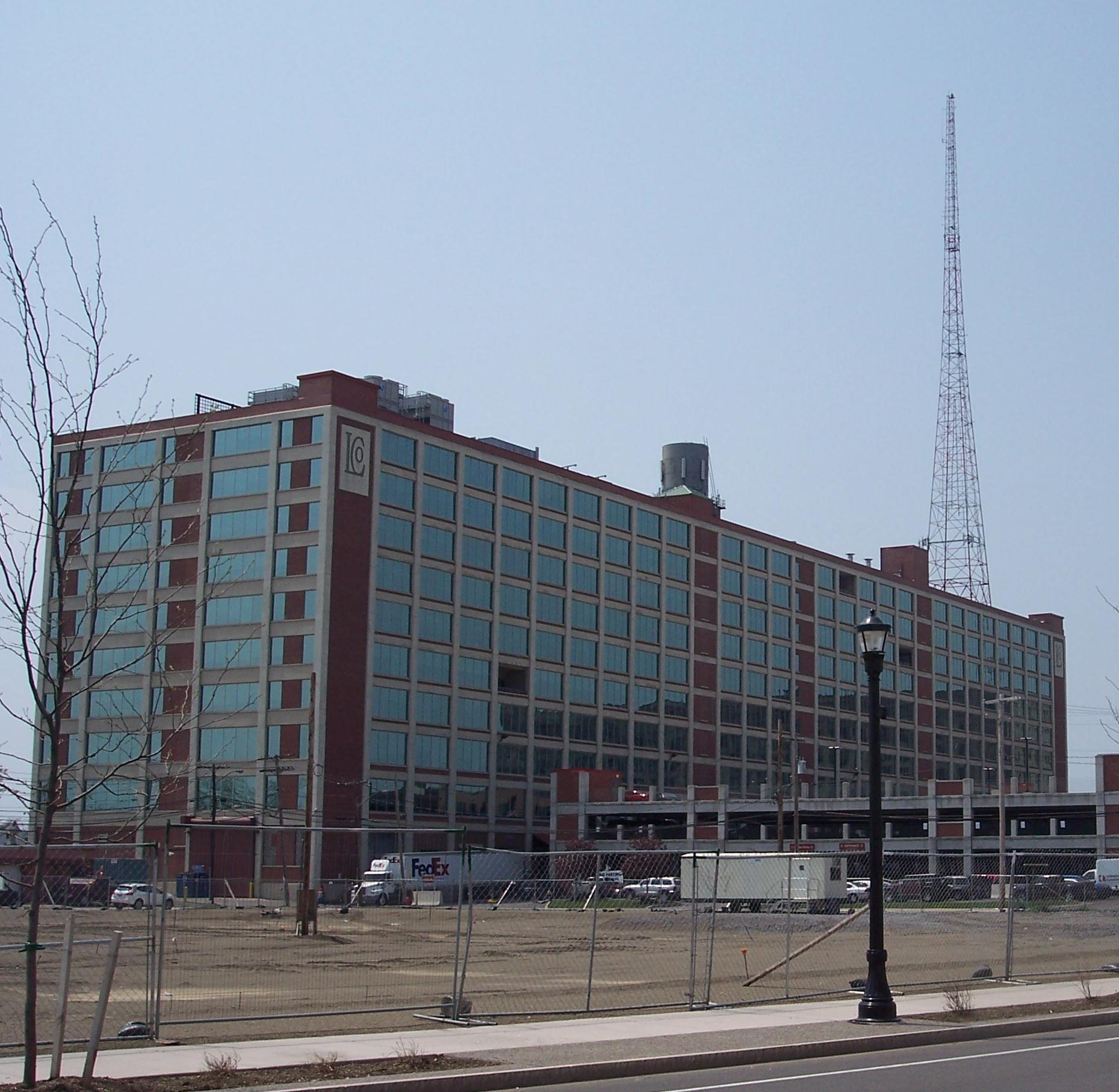
- Interactive map of the Larkin Terminal Warehouse area
- Alternative names: Larkin R/S/T Building, Larkin at Exchange

General information
- Status: Completed
- Type: Daylight Factory
- Architectural style: International style
- Location: 726 Exchange Street at van Rensselaer Street, Buffalo, New York, United States
- Coordinates: 42°52′30″N 78°51′07″W
- Current tenants: KeyBank, Kaleida Health, John R. Oishei Foundation
- Construction started: 1911
- Completed: 1912
- Renovated: 2002
- Owner: Larkin Development Group

Height
- Antenna spire: 286.1 ft (87.2 m)

Technical details
- Structural system: steel reinforced concrete
- Floor count: 10
- Floor area: 600,000 sq ft (55,741.8 m^{2})
- Lifts/elevators: 6

Design and construction
- Architect: Lockwood, Greene & Co.
- Main contractor: Aberthaw Construction Co

Website
- larkindg.com

The Larkin Terminal Warehouse, also known as Larkin at Exchange or the Larkin R/S/T Building, is located at 726 Exchange Street, Buffalo, New York in a neighborhood known as the "Hydraulics." The neighborhood was one of Buffalo's earliest industrial districts and its name is derived from the construction of a small hydraulic canal. The building, clearly visible from the I-190 interstate, was originally part of the Larkin Company and was one of the last constructed buildings in the complex. The building has a radio tower on the roof erected by WEBR-AM in 1936.

== History ==
The Larkin Company owned the building until 1967, when it was sold to Graphic Controls. In 2001, CityView Properties purchased the building from Graphic Controls. The group has spent over $40 million in renovations to the building. On September 10, 2009, First Niagara Financial Group relocated its corporate headquarters to the Larkin Terminal Warehouse building.

As of January 2016, the John R. Oishei Foundation's headquarters are located at the Larkin Terminal Warehouse. As of December 2015, the Foundation has $300 million in assets and gives away nearly $20 million annually. It is among the region's most well-known grant makers, providing resources for programs, capital projects and nonprofit executive development and in the last few years alone, it provided multimillion-dollar gifts to the largest health and education projects in Western New York.

== Larkin Complex ==
Other buildings in the Larkin complex include:

- Larkin Power station at 635 Seneca Street.
- Larkin Factory Complex Buildings: B, C, D, E, F, G, H, J, K N, O, (The Seneca Industrial Center) at 701 Seneca Street.
- Larkin L/M Warehouse (now Army Navy Surplus), at 290 Larkin Street.
- Larkin U Building at 239 Rensselaer street.
- Larkin Men's Club at 696 Seneca Street.
- Larkin Administration Building (Demolished) 680 Seneca Street

== Gallery ==
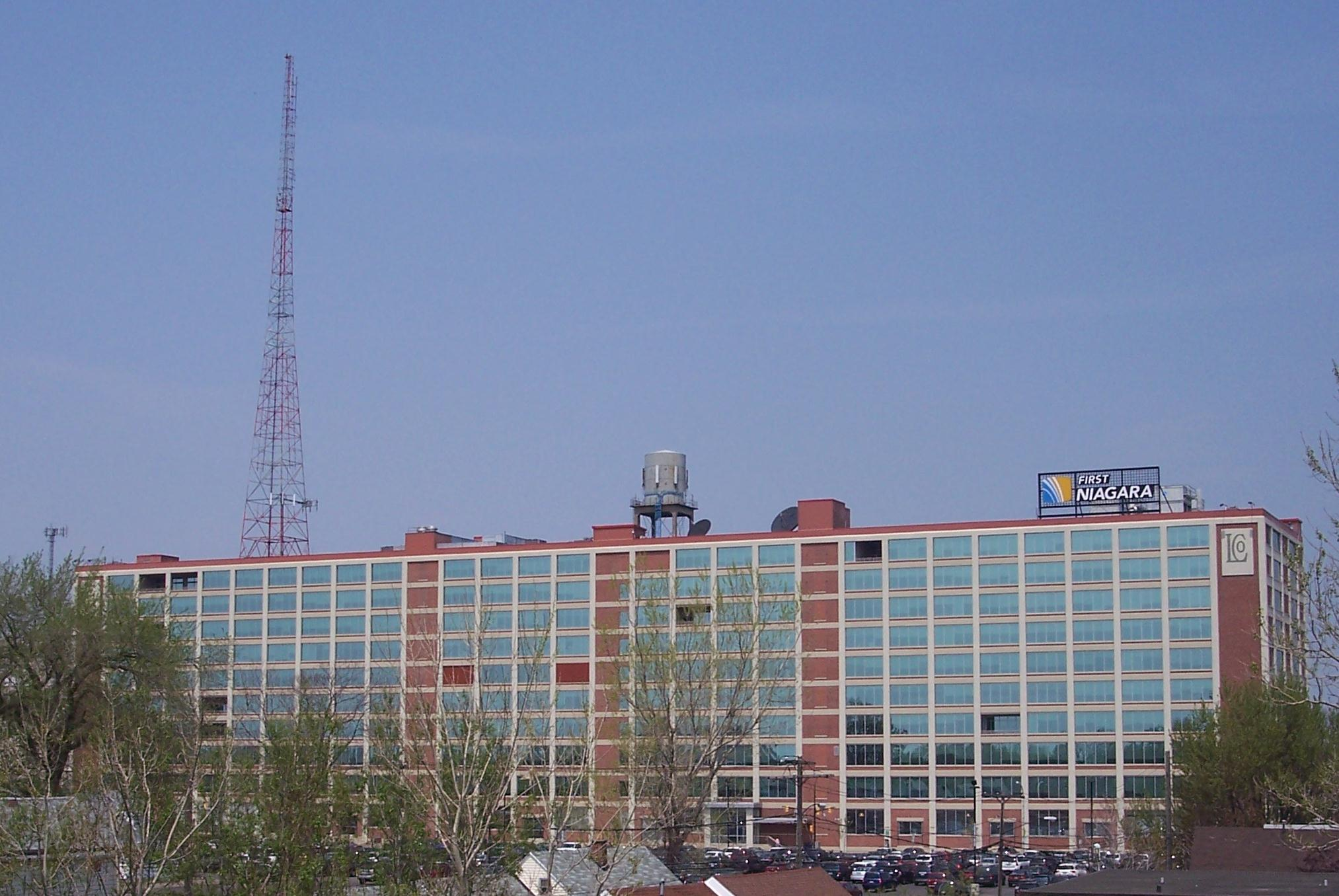
View from the I-190 interstate

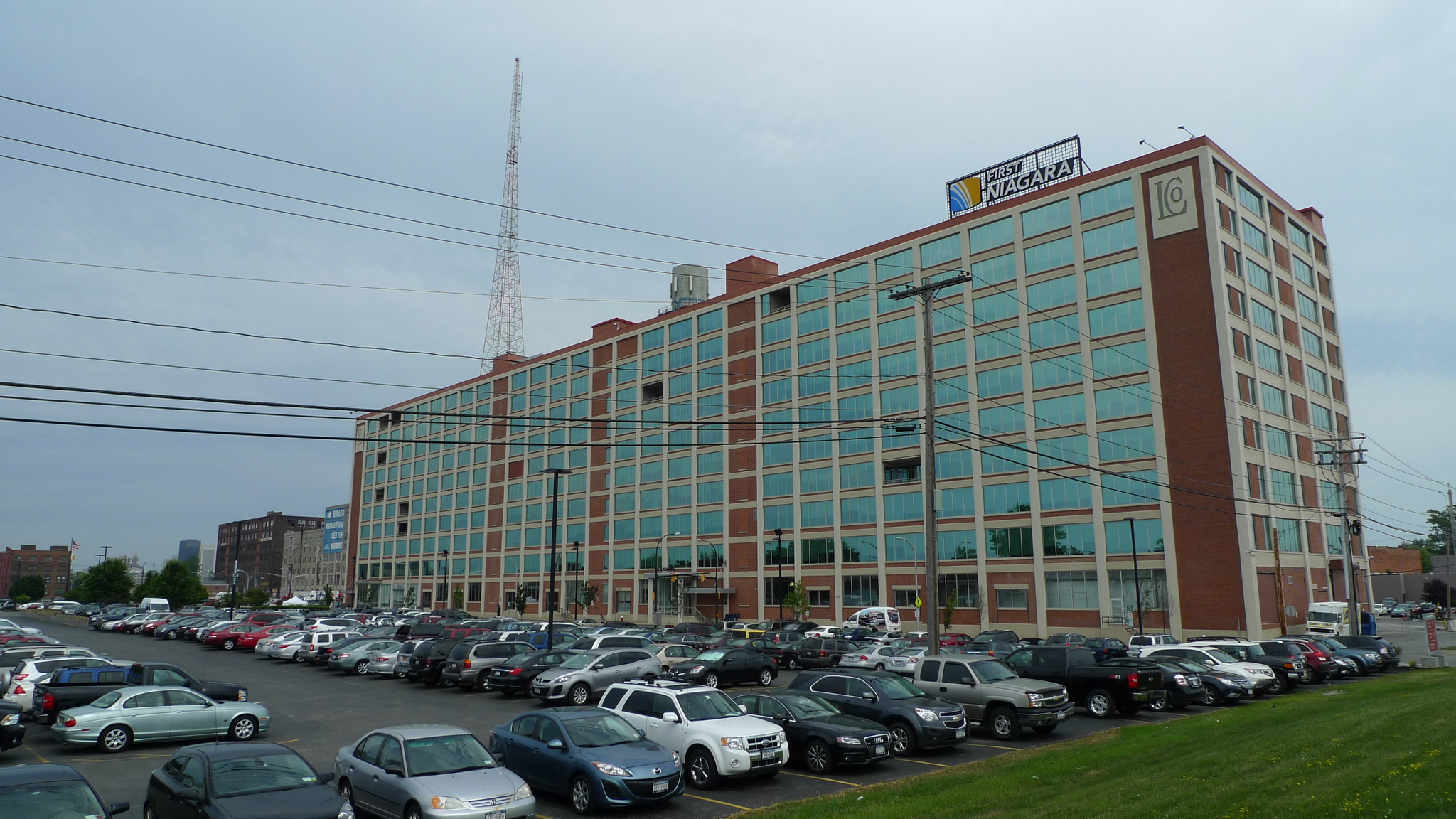

== See also ==
- Larkinville
