= First Niagara Bank =

American bank based in Buffalo, NY, United States

First Niagara Bank, N.A. (First Niagara Financial Group)
- Type: Public
- Traded as: Nasdaq: FNFG
- Industry: Banking, Finance and Insurance
- Founded: Lockport, New York May 11, 1870
- Defunct: October 7, 2016
- Fate: Acquired by KeyBank
- Successor: KeyBank
- Headquarters: Larkin Terminal Warehouse; 726 Exchange Street; Buffalo, New York
- Number of locations: 404 (2016)
- Area served: Mid-Atlantic, New England
- Key people: Gary M. Crosby (President and CEO); Joe Saffire (Executive Vice President); Greg Norwood (Chief Financial Officer); Mark Rendulic (Executive Vice President)
- Products: Financial services
- Total assets: $40.02 billion (2016)
- Number of employees: ~5,000
- Website: www.firstniagara.com

First Niagara Bank was a Federal Deposit Insurance Corporation-insured regional banking corporation headquartered in Buffalo, New York. Its parent company, First Niagara Financial Group, Inc. was the 44th-largest bank in the United States with assets of over $37.1 billion as of June 30, 2013.

== History ==
It was founded in 1870 as Farmers and Mechanics' Savings Bank and was then re-branded as Lockport Savings Bank in 1967. In 2000 the bank was rebranded as First Niagara. The bank was based in its former home county, Niagara until the 1990s when it spread to nearby Buffalo, New York and its surrounding Erie County. Part of this growth could be attributed to the collapse of the Buffalo-centric banks Goldome and Empire of America. Most of this growth was from the recruitment of new customers, as opposed to the purchase of other firms' assets. Although, in 1998 the bank did purchase the regional insurance brokerage firm Warren-Hoffman & Associates Inc. as a means of entering the insurance business. First Niagara, in 2000, acquired Albion Bancorp of Albion, NY to bring the total number of bank branches to 22.

In 2002, First Niagara acquired Cayuga Bank of Auburn, New York and Cortland Savings Bank in Cortland, New York. In 2003, First Niagara acquired the Bank of Finger Lakes in Geneva, New York. In 2004, First Niagara acquired Troy Savings Bank in Albany, New York. In 2005, First Niagara acquired Hudson River Bank and Trust in Hudson, New York.

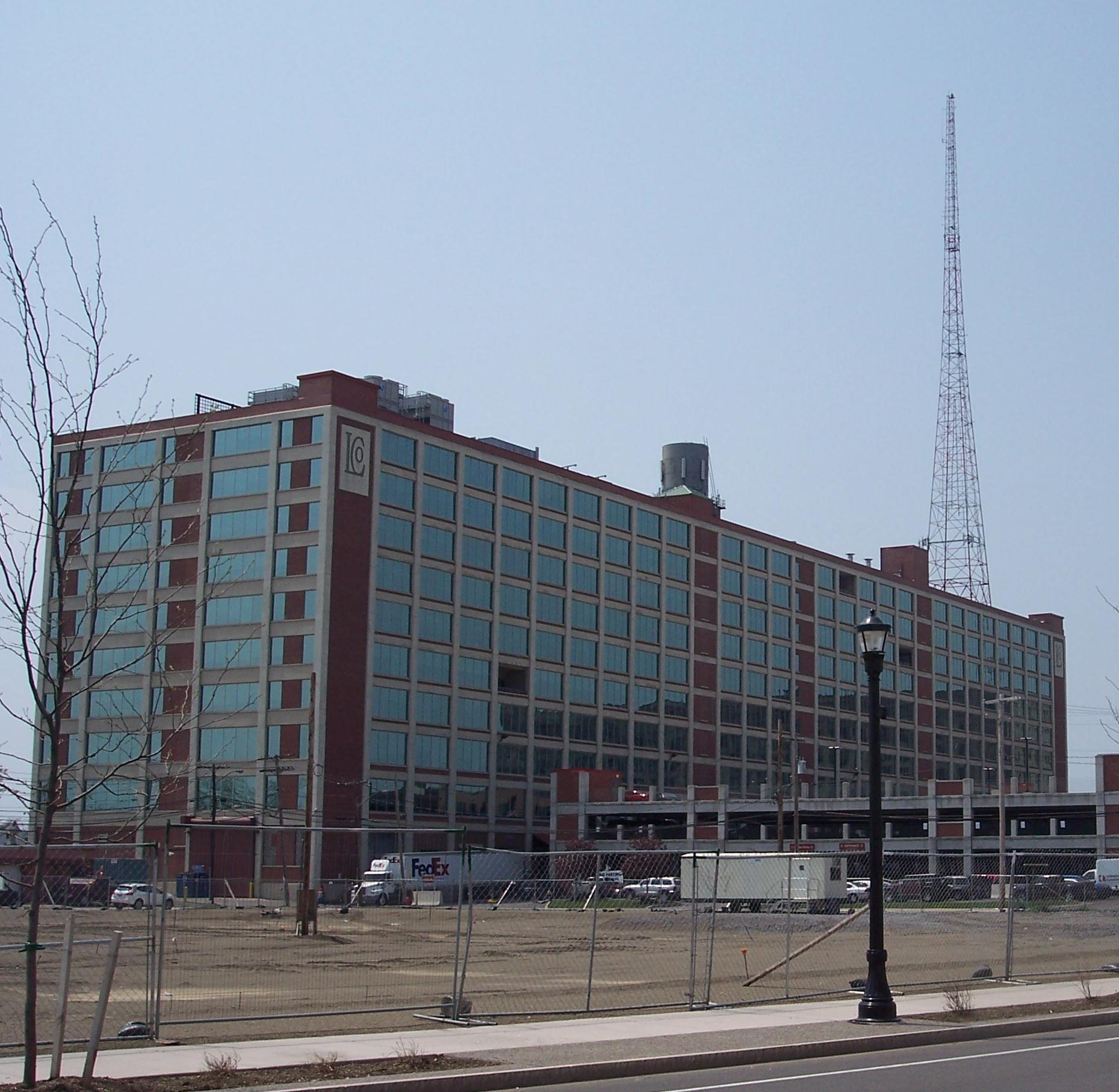
First Niagara's former headquarters located in the LCo Building, Buffalo.

In September 2007, it was announced that First Niagara was to purchase Great Lakes Bancorp, parent company of Greater Buffalo Savings Bank. The price to purchase the 16 branch bank was $153 million. With the nearly $900 million of assets of the Great Lakes Bancorp, First Niagara became the fourth largest bank in the Buffalo-Niagara region. In April 2009, First Niagara acquired 57 of the 61 of National City branches in Erie and Pittsburgh, Pennsylvania. They were rebranded on Labor Day weekend in 2009. In conjunction with the expansion into Pittsburgh, First Niagara bought the naming rights for a concert venue, First Niagara Pavilion.

In April 2010, First Niagara Financial Group acquired Pennsylvania-based Harleysville National. This created a bank with $19.7 billion in assets, 254 branches and approximately $13.7 billion in deposits.

In August 2010, First Niagara announced its acquisition of NewAlliance Bank of Connecticut. The stock holders approved the merger in December 2010 and the transaction closed on April 15, 2011. This provided First Niagara with over 340 branches and 500 ATMs.

On August 25, 2011, First Niagara bought the naming rights for HSBC Arena in Buffalo, renaming it the First Niagara Center.

On October 30, 2015, First Niagara Bank agreed to be acquired by KeyCorp. 18 branches in Erie and Niagara Counties were sold to Northwest Savings Bank for antitrust reasons.

== 21st century growth ==
=== National City ===
On April 7, 2009, First Niagara agreed to buy 57 National City branches in Western Pennsylvania from PNC Financial Services and officially took over those branches on September 8 after the signs were changed over from National City during Labor Day Weekend.

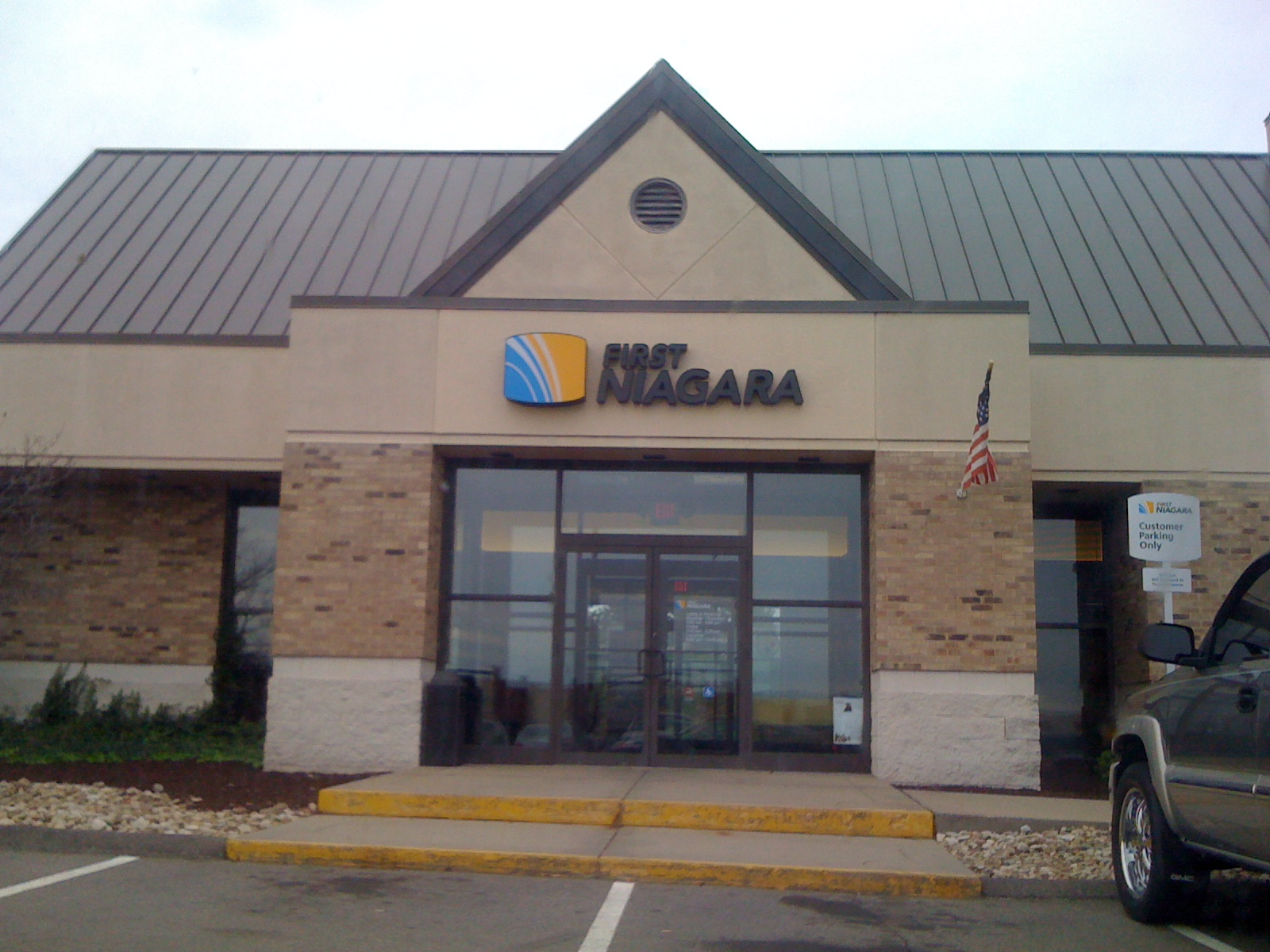
A First Niagara branch in Cranberry Township, Pennsylvania along U.S. Route 19 just off the Pennsylvania Turnpike. This is a former National City branch.

PNC, which had acquired National City in late 2008 with money from the $700 billion bailout plan after National City suffered losses in the subprime mortgage crisis, was required by the United States Department of Justice to sell 50 National City branches in the Pittsburgh area and 11 more branches in and around Erie to competitors, since the two banks had significant overlap in Western Pennsylvania—PNC and National City were number 1 and 2 in market share, respectively—and had potential antitrust issues in the area. (Even after the sale was completed, PNC retained a market-leading 46% share in the Pittsburgh market, with Citizens Financial Group in a distant second at 13%.) A dark horse candidate, the sale to First Niagara was considered a surprise, considering that PNC was also in negotiations with much larger banks such as JPMorgan Chase, Wells Fargo, Fifth Third Bank, KeyBank, Huntington Bancshares, and FNB Corporation for the branches. Fifth Third, Huntington, & FNB had existing branches in the market, while JPMorgan Chase's retail banking division & Key were in adjacent territories, and Wells Fargo was in the process of expanding its Eastern U.S. operations by way of its acquisition of Wachovia. Before the deal was announced, First Niagara was thought to be interested only in the Erie-area National City branches.

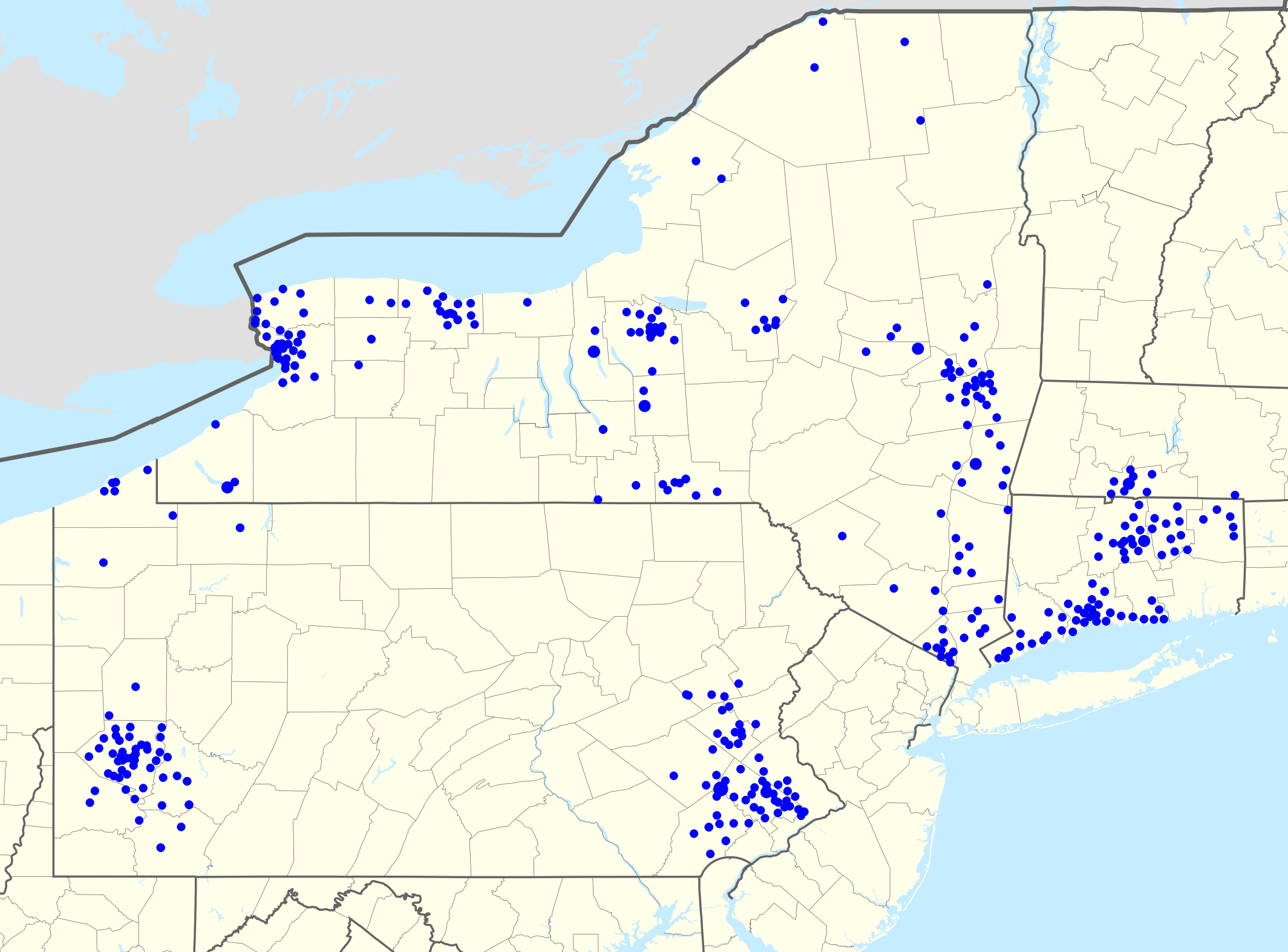
First Niagara branch footprint as of March 2013.

First Niagara, which had been eyeing an expansion into Pittsburgh for some time, was immediately ranked third in market share at 8%, ahead of the longer-established Dollar Bank and First Commonwealth Bank at six and five percent, respectively. First Niagara retained all National City employees at the acquired branches in the Pittsburgh and Erie areas, and established a regional office in Downtown Pittsburgh's 11 Stanwix Street tower.

First Niagara was outbid for the four branches in Crawford County, Pennsylvania that PNC had to divest. Of those four, one branch in Titusville was sold to Emclaire Financial Group while the other three (one in Conneaut Lake, the other two in Meadville, including the branch inside Wal-Mart) were sold to Marquette Savings Bank.

On August 4, 2009, First Niagara agreed to take over the automatic teller machines (ATMs) at 95 Sheetz locations throughout Western Pennsylvania, replacing M&T Bank, which doesn't have any bank branches in the region. The ATMs, which officially become First Niagara ATMs at the same time First Niagara took over the former National City branches, will be surcharge-free from First Niagara itself, though people using the ATMs may still be charged a foreign ATM fee from their primary financial institution if they charge such fees. The ATM's were later replaced by PNC across Sheetz's footprint.

=== Harleysville National ===
On July 27, 2009, First Niagara agreed to acquire the Philadelphia-area-based Harleysville National Corporation financial services company in an all-stock transaction valued at approximately US$237,000,000 or $5.50 per share, allowing First Niagara its first access to the Philadelphia market. The deal provided First Niagara with $5.6 billion in assets, including $3.6 billion in loans and $4.1 billion in deposits in 83 bank branches in nine Eastern Pennsylvania counties. The parent company of Harleysville National Bank also operates East Penn Bank, Millennium Wealth Management and Cornerstone Companies. First Niagara maintained all Harleysville National and East Penn branches, and the Pennsylvania company's growing commercial banking and wealth-management business. Harleysville had over 1,100 employees. The deal was completed on April 9, 2010.

=== HSBC deal expands presence in northeastern U.S. ===
On July 31, 2011, First Niagara announced it would purchase from UK-based HSBC Holdings plc nearly half of its HSBC Bank USA branch network, including 195 branches for a price of US$1 billion. Of these, six branches in New York City suburbs, and six in Connecticut; most of these branches had been part of Buffalo-based Marine Midland Bank before being re-branded to HSBC Bank USA in the late 1990s. The deal included US$15 billion in deposits, US$2.8 billion in loans, and US$4.3 billion in assets under management. The deal also nearly doubled First Niagara's branch network to about 450 branches, US$38 billion in assets, and US$30 billion in deposits. Pending regulatory approval, the deal will close in early 2012. Investors had complained that HSBC had spread itself too thinly, with roughly 95 million customers and 300,000 employees in 87 markets. As a result of the acquisition, the United States Department of Justice required First Niagara to divest itself of 26 branches. First Niagara ended up spinning off 64 branches; 37 to KeyBank, 19 to Community Bank, and 8 to Five Star Bank.

On October 30, 2015, First Niagara Bank agreed to be acquired by KeyCorp.

== See also ==
- Bank of Holland
- M&T Bank
