= Holland, New York =

- Town
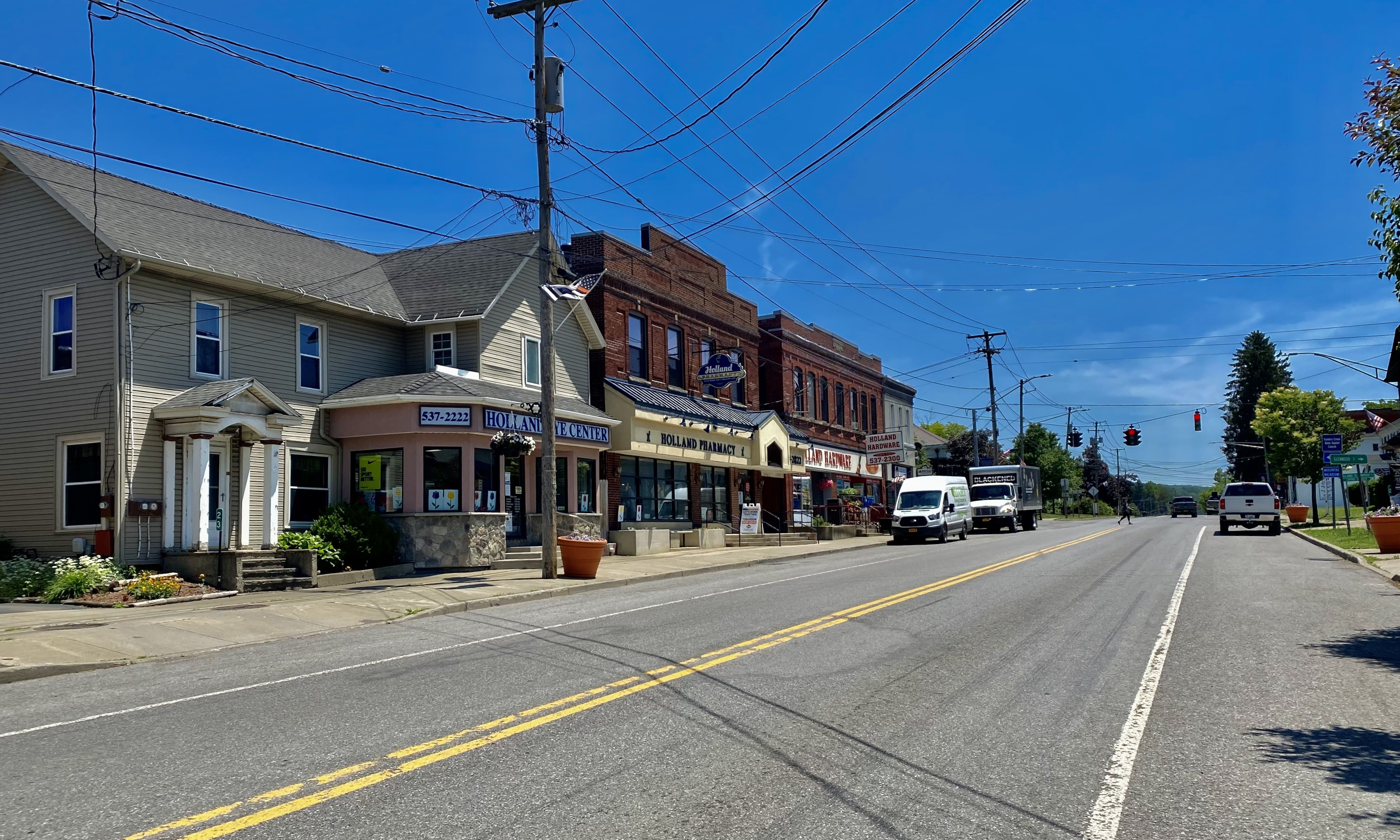
- View along North Main Street in the town center as seen in June 2021

- Seal

- Location in Erie County and the state of New York.

- Location of New York in the United States
- Coordinates: 42°38′28″N 78°32′28″W
- Country: United States
- State: New York
- Counties: Erie County
- Incorporated: 1818
- Named for: Holland Land Company

Government
  - Mayor: Michael C. Kasprzyk (R) Town Council: Geoffrey W. Hack (R); Karen L. Kline (R); Roberta A. Herr (R); James E. Britt (R)

Area
  - Total: 35.83 sq mi (92.79 km^{2})
  - Land: 35.79 sq mi (92.70 km^{2})
  - Water: 0.035 sq mi (0.09 km^{2})
- Elevation: 1,529 ft (466 m)

Population (2020)
  - Total: 3,281
  - Density: 91.6/sq mi (35.36/km^{2})
- Time zone: UTC-5 (EST)
  - Summer (DST): UTC-4 (EDT)
- ZIP Codes: 14080 (Holland); 14139 (South Wales); 14145 (Strykersville)
- Area code: 716
- FIPS code: 36-029-35122
- FIPS code: 36-35122
- GNIS feature ID: 979070
- Website: www.townofhollandny.gov

Holland is a town in Erie County, New York, United States. The population was 3,281 at the 2020 census. The name is derived from the Holland Land Company, the original title-holder to most of the land of Western New York.

Holland is one of the "Southtowns" of Erie County, located in the southeast part of the county, and to the southeast of Buffalo.

== History ==
The town was first settled along its northern border, then called "Humphrey Valley", in 1807.

The town of Holland was established in 1818 from part of the (now defunct) town of Willink, which once included all the southern part of Erie County. The name was derived from Willem Willink, one of the original investors of the Holland Land Company, which owned most of the land in western New York and sold it off to cities and townships that exist today. The name "Holland" is one of many surviving remnants of the Dutch investors who once owned this region. As with the town of Willink, the locations named after these investors have been given new names. Many of the original town buildings met their fate due to fire. Today the Holland Historical Society resides in the original fire hall on Main Street.

== Geography ==
According to the United States Census Bureau, the town has a total area of 35.8 square miles (92.8 km^{2}), of which 35.8 square miles (92.7 km^{2}) is land and 0.04 square miles (0.1 km^{2}), or 0.10%, is water.

The east town line is the border of the town of Java in Wyoming County. The north town line is the border of the town of Wales, The west town line is the border of the town of Colden, and the south town line is the border of the town of Sardinia

New York State Route 16 is a major north–south highway through the town.

The East Branch of Cazenovia Creek flows northward through Holland.

== Holland Central Schools ==
Established in 1933, the school was centralized and a new building was put up on 103 Canada Street. Students left the old school, located today where the town hall resides, after Christmas break of 1932, and moved into the new establishment in January. The Harold O. Brumstead elementary building was added in 1960, and a middle school was built in 1973 on the corner of Partridge and Route 16. The original building on Canada Street is currently the Holland Junior/Senior High School.

In November 1982, Holland's boys varsity soccer team tied Mattituck, 1-1, in the state Class C soccer finals, earning the school's first state title in any sport. As of 2010, only one other Section 6 boys soccer team since 1978 (North Collins, Class D, 1994) had won a NYSPHSAA crown.

== Notable people ==
- Dave Hack, former CFL player
- James M. Humphrey, former US congressman
- Laura (Colby) Ingalls, mother of Charles Ingalls and grandmother of Laura Ingalls Wilder (Little House on the Prairie), was born here on November 5, 1810
- Mike Raymer, Emmy Award winner
- Frank E. Wheelock, a founder and first mayor of Lubbock, Texas, born in Holland in 1863

== Events ==
- Holland Tulip Festival (annually held between the 1st through 3 May)
- Holland Speedway (annually held throughout June–August)

== Demographics ==
Historical population
Census	Pop.	Note	%±
1820	768		—
1830	1,070		39.3%
1840	1,242		16.1%
1850	1,315		5.9%
1860	1,538		17.0%
1870	1,451		−5.7%
1880	1,720		18.5%
1890	1,595		−7.3%
1900	1,434		−10.1%
1910	1,468		2.4%
1920	1,410		−4.0%
1930	1,473		4.5%
1940	1,496		1.6%
1950	1,728		15.5%
1960	2,304		33.3%
1970	3,140		36.3%
1980	3,446		9.7%
1990	3,572		3.7%
2000	3,603		0.9%
2010	3,401		−5.6%
2020	3,281		−3.5%

As of the census of 2000, there were 3,603 people, 1,332 households, and 981 families residing in the town. The population density was 100.7 inhabitants per square mile (38.9/km^{2}). There were 1,408 housing units at an average density of 39.3 per square mile (15.2/km^{2}). The racial makeup of the town was 98.17% White, 0.50% Black or African American, 0.31% Native American, 0.39% Asian, 0.14% from other races, and 0.50% from two or more races. Hispanic or Latino of any race were 0.36% of the population.

There were 1,332 households, out of which 36.6% had children under the age of 18 living with them, 62.3% were married couples living together, 8.2% had a female householder with no husband present, and 26.3% were non-families. 20.4% of all households were made up of individuals, and 8.5% had someone living alone who was 65 years of age or older. The average household size was 2.70 and the average family size was 3.16.

In the town, the population was spread out, with 27.7% under the age of 18, 6.9% from 18 to 24, 31.6% from 25 to 44, 23.9% from 45 to 64, and 9.9% who were 65 years of age or older. The median age was 36 years. For every 100 females, there were 99.1 males. For every 100 females age 18 and over, there were 99.8 males.

The median income for a household in the town was $46,708, and the median income for a family was $55,885. Males had a median income of $40,670 versus $25,886 for females. The per capita income for the town was $19,196. About 8.0% of families and 9.7% of the population were below the poverty line, including 12.0% of those under age 18 and 9.9% of those age 65 or over.

== Communities and locations in Holland ==
- Dutchtown – A hamlet in the southeastern part of the town.
- East Holland – A location in the northeast part of the town.
- Holland – This hamlet, sometimes called Holland Village, is the principal community and the location of the town government. The community is located on NY-16.
- Mountain Meadows Lake – A small lake by the east town line.
- Protection – A hamlet on the border of the town of Sardinia in the southeast part of the town.
- Vermont Hill – A small elevation in the northern part of Holland.
- Zider Zee – A restaurant on Olean Road

== See also ==
- Bank of Holland
- Holland Speedway
- Holland (CDP), New York, a census district corresponding to the hamlet of Holland
