= Harleysville National Corporation =

Harleysville National Corporation (NASDAQ:HNBC) was a Harleysville, Pennsylvania-based regional banking corporation insured by the FDIC. It offered consumer and commercial banking, and wealth management services. The corporation operated its banks under the Harleysville National Bank brand.

== History ==
It was founded by local entrepreneur Alvin Alderfer on October 28, 1909. In 2004, Harleysville National Corporation completed the acquisition of and merger with Millennium Wealth Management, and in 2006, acquired the Cornerstone Companies. These acquisitions allowed for the company to expand its wealth management services. In 2007, it completed the acquisition of East Penn Bank and Willow Financial Bank. East Penn Bank was a community bank of the Lehigh Valley founded in 1990 and headquartered in Emmaus, Pennsylvania. Harleysville paid $92.7 million or $14.50 a share for East Penn Bank in an all-stock transaction. It kept the East Penn Bank branches branded as East Penn Bank, and they became a wholly owned subsidiary. Harleysville has a branch network of over 80 offices throughout ten counties in eastern Pennsylvania operated under the Harleysville National and East Penn brands.

=== Acquisition ===
On July 27, 2009, First Niagara Bank agreed to acquire the company in an all-stock transaction valued at approximately $237 million or $5.50 per share. The deal provided First Niagara with $5.6 billion in assets, including $3.6 billion in loans and $4.1 billion in deposits in 83 bank branches across nine Eastern Pennsylvania counties. First Niagara acquired all of Harleysville National Bank which also operates East Penn Bank, Millennium Wealth Management and Cornerstone Companies.

First Niagara intended to maintain all Harleysville National and East Penn branches, and the Pennsylvania company's growing commercial banking and wealth-management business. Harleysville's workforce totals over 1,100 employees.
