= Holland (CDP), New York =

Holland, New York
- Census-designated place
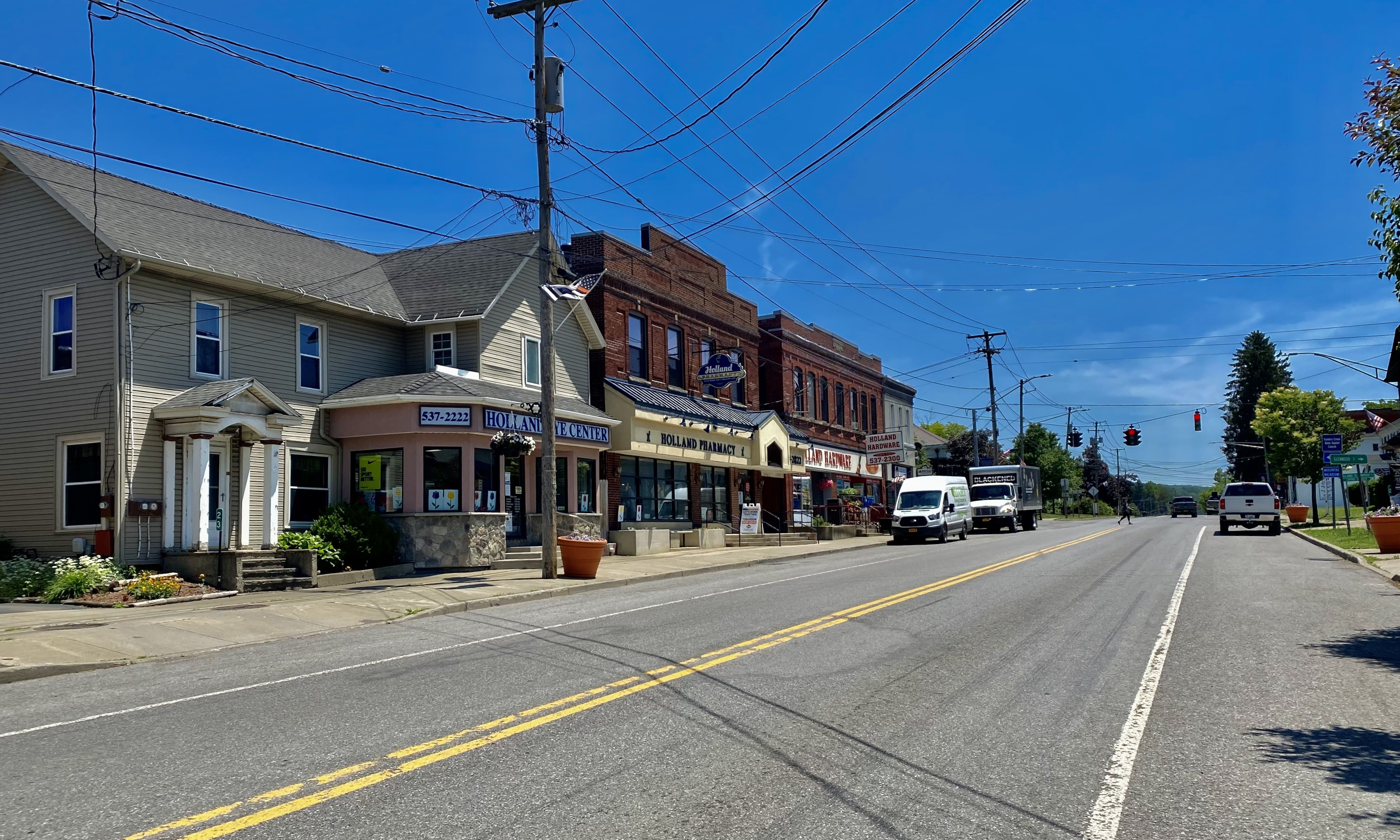
- View along North Main Street in the town center, as seen in June 2021

- Location in Erie County and the state of New York
- Coordinates: 42°38′29″N 78°32′36″W
- Country: United States
- State: New York
- County: Erie
- Town: Holland

Area
  - Total: 4.00 sq mi (10.37 km^{2})
  - Land: 4.00 sq mi (10.37 km^{2})
  - Water: 0 sq mi (0.00 km^{2})
- Elevation: 1,106 ft (337 m)

Population (2020)
  - Total: 1,173
  - Density: 293.0/sq mi (113.11/km^{2})
- Time zone: UTC-5 (Eastern (EST))
  - Summer (DST): UTC-4 (EDT)
- ZIP code: 14080
- Area code: 716
- FIPS code: 36-35111
- GNIS feature ID: 0952987

Holland is a hamlet and census-designated place (CDP) in Erie County, New York, United States. The population was 1,206 at the 2010 census. It is in the Buffalo-Niagara Falls metropolitan area.

== Geography ==
Holland is located at 42°38′28″N 78°32′36″W (42.641305, -78.543367).

According to the United States Census Bureau, the CDP has a total area of 3.6 square miles (9.2 km^{2}), all land.

== Demographics ==
Historical population
Census	Pop.	Note	%±
2020	1,173		—
U.S. Decennial Census

As of the census of 2000, there were 1,261 people, 488 households, and 328 families living in the CDP. The population density was 354.7 inhabitants per square mile (137.0/km^{2}). There were 507 housing units at an average density of 142.6 per square mile (55.1/km^{2}). The racial makeup of the CDP was 98.10% White, 0.63% Black or African American, 0.08% Native American, 0.48% Asian, 0.08% from other races, and 0.63% from two or more races. Hispanic or Latino of any race were 0.32% of the population.

There were 488 households, out of which 34.0% had children under the age of 18 living with them, 54.3% were married couples living together, 10.2% had a female householder with no husband present, and 32.6% were non-families. 27.0% of all households were made up of individuals, and 13.3% had someone living alone who was 65 years of age or older. The average household size was 2.58 and the average family size was 3.19.

In the CDP, the population was spread out, with 27.1% under the age of 18, 7.5% from 18 to 24, 30.1% from 25 to 44, 22.1% from 45 to 64, and 13.1% who were 65 years of age or older. The median age was 37 years. For every 100 females, there were 96.4 males. For every 100 females age 18 and over, there were 95.5 males.

The median income for a household in the CDP was $39,702, and the median income for a family was $56,806. Males had a median income of $40,250 versus $25,461 for females. The per capita income for the CDP was $18,721. About 7.5% of families and 10.2% of the population were below the poverty line, including 11.6% of those under age 18 and 14.6% of those age 65 or over.
