= Bank of Holland =

Bank based in Holland, New York

Coordinates: 42°38′28″N 78°32′29″W

- Company type: Private
- Industry: Banking and Finance
- Founded: United States (1893)
- Headquarters: Holland, New York, United States
- Area served: Western New York
- Products: Financial services
- Number of employees: unknown
- Website: www.bankofhollandny.com

The Bank of Holland is a Federal Deposit Insurance Corporation-insured banking corporation that was founded and is headquartered in the town of Holland, New York. It offers a wide range of banking services including savings and checking accounts, mortgages and business and personal loans. The bank has three branches- one in Holland, one in East Aurora, New York, and new one in Elma, New York a former Bank of America branch and automated teller machines throughout Western New York state.
