= Tonawanda (CDP), New York =

Tonawanda, New York
- Census-designated place
- Location in Erie County and the state of New York
- Coordinates: 42°59′7″N 78°51′8″W
- Country: United States
- State: New York
- County: Erie
- Town: Tonawanda

Area
  - Total: 18.6 sq mi (48.3 km^{2})
  - Land: 17.3 sq mi (44.8 km^{2})
  - Water: 1.4 sq mi (3.5 km^{2})
- Elevation: 574 ft (175 m)

Population (2020)
  - Total: 57,431 ▼
  - Density: 3,361/sq mi (1,297.7/km^{2})
- Time zone: UTC-5 (Eastern (EST))
  - Summer (DST): UTC-4 (EDT)
- ZIP Codes: 14150 (Tonawanda city); 14217, 14223 (Town of Tonawanda)
- Area code: 716
- FIPS code: 36-74183
- GNIS feature ID: 0967652

Tonawanda is a census-designated place (CDP) in Erie County, New York, United States. The CDP comprises the town of Tonawanda minus its subsidiary village of Kenmore. As of the 2010 census, the CDP population was 58,144.

== Geography ==
Tonawanda is located at 42°59′7″N 78°51′7″W (42.985307, -78.852127).

According to the United States Census Bureau, the CDP has a total area of 18.6 square miles (48.3 km^{2}), of which 17.3 square miles (44.8 km^{2}) is land and 1.4 square miles (3.5 km^{2}), or 7.17%, is water.

== Demographics ==
Historical population
Census	Pop.	Note	%±
1980	72,795		—
1990	65,284		−10.3%
2000	61,729		−5.4%
2010	58,144		−5.8%
2020	57,431		−1.2%

As of the census of 2000, there were 61,729 people, 26,207 households, and 16,929 families living in the CDP. The population density was 3,554.2 inhabitants per square mile (1,372.3/km^{2}). There were 27,175 housing units at an average density of 1,564.7 per square mile (604.1/km^{2}). The racial makeup of the CDP was 95.74% White, 1.52% Black or African American, 0.25% Native American, 1.30% Asian, 0.01% Pacific Islander, 0.36% from other races, and 0.82% from two or more races. Hispanic or Latino of any race were 1.30% of the population.

There were 26,207 households, out of which 26.3% had children under the age of 18 living with them, 51.2% were married couples living together, 10.3% had a female householder with no husband present, and 35.4% were non-families. 30.9% of all households were made up of individuals, and 15.3% had someone living alone who was 65 years of age or older. The average household size was 2.33 and the average family size was 2.93.

In the CDP, the population was spread out, with 21.5% under the age of 18, 7.2% from 18 to 24, 26.6% from 25 to 44, 22.7% from 45 to 64, and 22.1% who were 65 years of age or older. The median age was 42 years. For every 100 females, there were 88.4 males. For every 100 females age 18 and over, there were 84.4 males.

The median income for a household in the CDP was $41,332, and the median income for a family was $51,071. Males had a median income of $39,540 versus $27,067 for females. The per capita income for the CDP was $20,748. About 5.2% of families and 7.3% of the population were below the poverty line, including 9.7% of those under age 18 and 5.4% of those age 65 or over.

== Education ==
Tonawonda CDP is mostly located in Kenmore-Tonawanda Union Free School District, while a portion is in Sweet Home Central School District.

== See also ==
- Tonawanda (disambiguation)
