= Grumman F9F =

Grumman F9F may refer to the following aircraft:

- Grumman F9F Panther, in the 1940s–50s
- Grumman F-9 Cougar, in the 1950s–70s
