= F9F =

F9F may refer to:

- Grumman F9F Panther jet fighter (straight wing)
- Grumman F9F Cougar jet fighter (swept wing development of the Panther)
