= Kenilworth, Erie County, New York =

Hamlet in New York, United States

Coordinates: 42°57′41″N 78°50′17″W

Kenilworth is a hamlet in the town of Tonawanda in Erie County, New York, United States.
