= Town of Tonawanda Veterans Memorial =

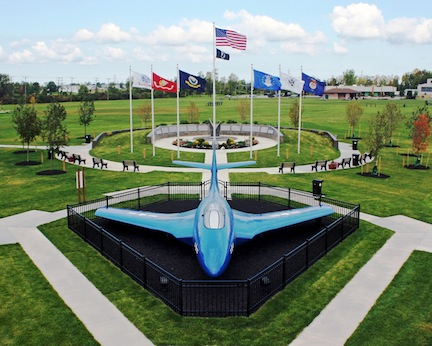
- Interactive map of Town of Tonawanda Veterans Memorial
- Location: Town of Tonawanda, New York, United States
- Coordinates: 42.99141°N 78.85304°W
- Established: August 18, 2009; 16 years ago

The Town of Tonawanda Veterans Memorial is a public memorial in the Town of Tonawanda, New York, USA. It is located in Walter M. Kenney Park (formerly Walter M. Kenney Field, and prior to that Conway Field), at the northwest corner of Brighton Road and Colvin Boulevard. The memorial stands to honor the service of all veterans of the United States Armed Forces.

Seven-foot-tall granite monument by Ralph Sirianni at the Town of Tonawanda Veterans Memorial.

Initial construction of the memorial took roughly seven weeks and was completed in mid-August 2009. The memorial was formally dedicated on August 18, 2009 before a crowd of more than 1,500 people. Retired U.S. Army General and former U.S. Secretary of State Colin L. Powell delivered the keynote address. A crowd of several hundred people gathered one year later, on August 18, 2010, for a re-dedication ceremony to commemorate the completion of a major expansion effort necessitated by the popularity of the memorial among interested donors.

The focal point of the memorial is a seven-foot-tall V-shaped monument of Paradiso granite, standing for Veterans. The monument was designed specifically for the memorial in 2007 by artist and Vietnam War veteran Ralph Sirianni. Sirianni's original sketch of the monument was featured on donation pamphlets distributed to residents of the Town of Tonawanda and did not depict the memorial wall or elevated landscape. Architectural firm Carmina, Wood & Morris designed the memorial and surrounding landscape, incorporating Sirianni's monument as the centerpiece.

Granite plaques engraved with the names of local veterans hang on two angled, semicircular walls. One wall partially surrounds the granite monument, while a second wall, constructed a year after the first, wraps around the reverse of the memorial's elevated platform. The site also features seven flagpoles, one flying the flag of the United States and the POW/MIA flag, and six others displaying the flags of the U.S. Army, Marine Corps, Navy, Air Force, Coast Guard, and Merchant Marine.

The memorial is surrounded by several trees and numerous park benches. Each tree and park bench bears a bronze plaque inscribed with the names of veterans, community organizations, or local businesses on whose behalf financial contributions were made to fund the memorial's construction. Adjacent to the memorial is a Korean War-era Grumman F9F-6P Cougar Naval airframe, on loan to the Town of Tonawanda from the U.S. government. The airframe was installed at its current location in May 1959 and is a well-known landmark in the community.

== History ==
=== Background ===
The Town of Tonawanda Veterans Memorial project began in 2004 as a grassroots effort to establish a permanent site in the town for residents to gather and pay tribute to their relatives, friends, and fellow Americans who have served or currently serve in the U.S. Military. In 2007, the Town of Tonawanda Veterans Memorial Steering Committee was established to see the project through to completion.

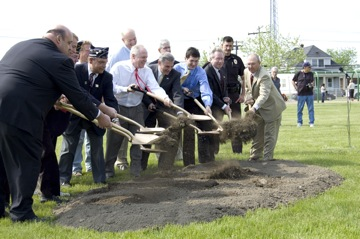
Groundbreaking ceremony held May 22, 2009.

To fund construction, the memorial steering committee solicited private donations from town residents and business owners. For $100, a donor could have the name of a military veteran of their choice engraved on the memorial. Donors could also have a tree, park bench, or flag pole dedicated in honor of a veteran for $1,000, $2,000, or $3,000, respectively. Between 2007 and 2009, the committee raised over $100,000 in private donations and successfully applied for $47,500 in grant funding offered by the State of New York.

By the spring of 2009, the committee had reached its funding goal to cover the cost of construction and the project was ready to be put out to bid. The Tonawanda Town Board agreed to designate space for the memorial at Walter M. Kenney Park and fully manage its construction. The project was put out to bid three times before an offer was returned within the range that the committee could afford. With a construction contractor confirmed and work set to begin, the memorial steering committee held a groundbreaking ceremony on May 22, 2009 at what was to be the future site of the memorial. Joining the steering committee that day were local military veterans and residents, as well as town and state officials.

=== The "Blue Jet" ===
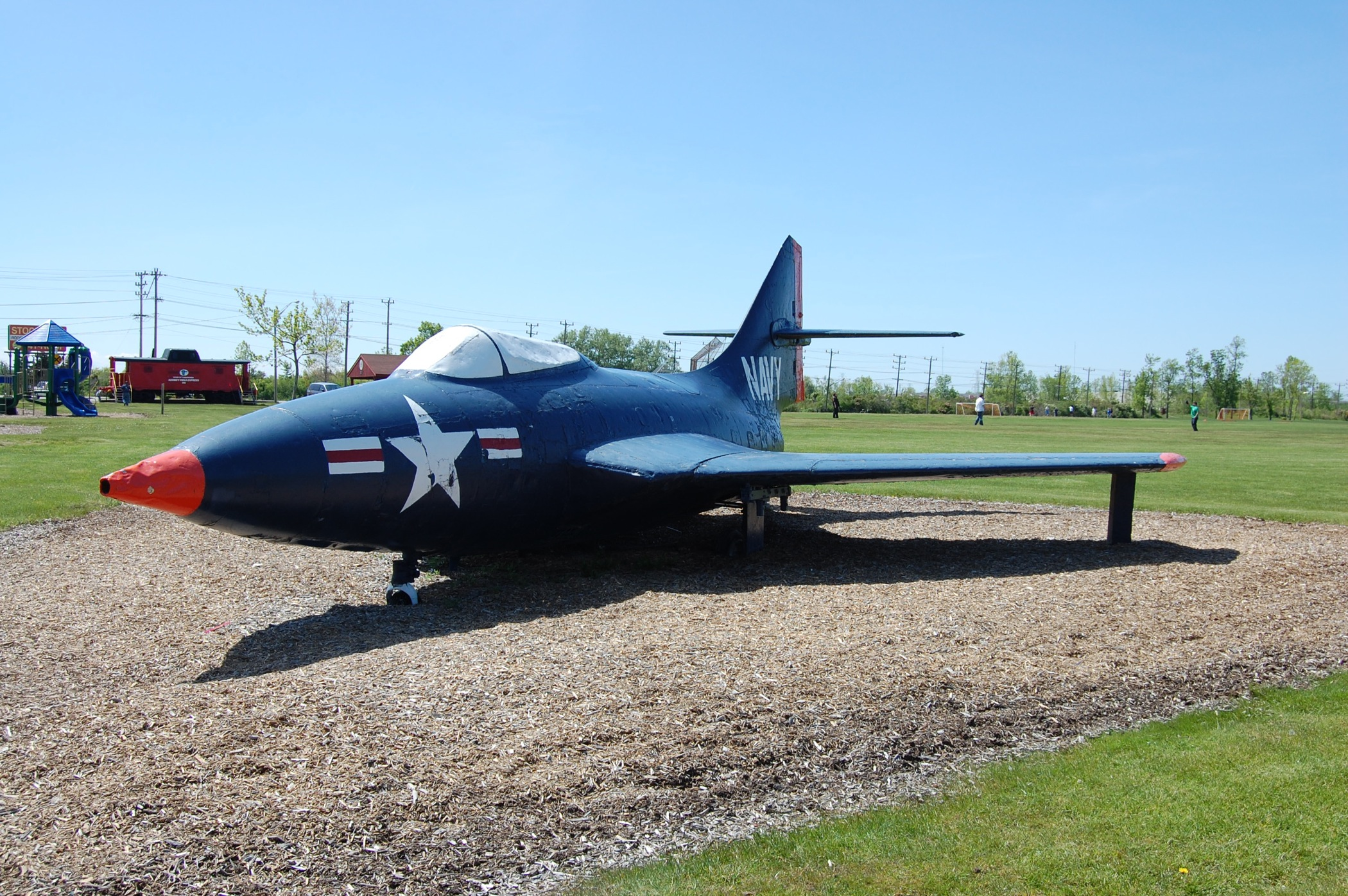
F9F-6P Cougar Before

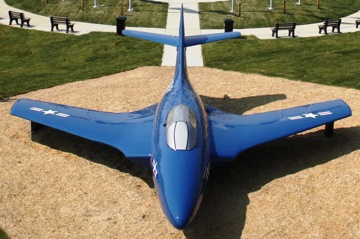
F9F-6P Cougar After

Walter M. Kenney Park was the chosen location for the Town of Tonawanda Veterans Memorial for its high visibility from nearby roads, ease of access for pedestrians, and for its historical significance as the longtime home of a Korean War-era Grumman F9F-6P Cougar Naval airframe, on loan to the town from the U.S. government. The "blue jet," as it is often called, has been on loan to the town from the U.S. government since May 1959. Today, the memorial sits directly behind the F9F-6P airframe.

During the construction of the memorial, a local auto collision business volunteered to refurbish the F9F-6P airframe. To refurbish the aluminum structure, volunteers removed all old paint, pounded out dents, filled in cracks and gaps, repainted all surfaces, and applied decals to the fuselage and wings. The entire process took roughly three weeks to complete.

Since its installation, the F9F-6P airframe had been used as a piece of playground equipment by local children. However, in February 2009, town government officials received paperwork from the National Museum of Naval Aviation requesting that the town take full responsibility for the loaned airframe's upkeep and make an effort to prevent people from climbing on its wings and fuselage. In response to this request, the town initially installed signage asking visitors to refrain from climbing on the airframe. However, the damage continued. Less than a year later, volunteers once again took to repairing the airframe, after which the town installed a four-foot high wrought-iron fence around the long-standing community icon. On July 11, 2014, a former resident of the area offered to commit an unspecified sum for the plane's upkeep if the town would remove the fence. The town responded that it is not permitted by the National Museum of Naval Aviation to permit people to climb on the plane. Further, it stated that because the plane was not maintained for a very long time, the last renovation required the use of carbon fiber, which is not resilient for climbing.

=== Dedication Ceremony ===
The Town of Tonawanda Veterans Memorial was unveiled to the public in a dedication ceremony the afternoon of Tuesday, August 18, 2009. The Tuesday date was chosen to accommodate the event's keynote speaker, Colin Powell, who was scheduled to visit the area for a separate event in nearby Buffalo, New York later that same day. Powell is connected to the Town of Tonawanda through his sister and brother-in-law, who were once residents of the town.

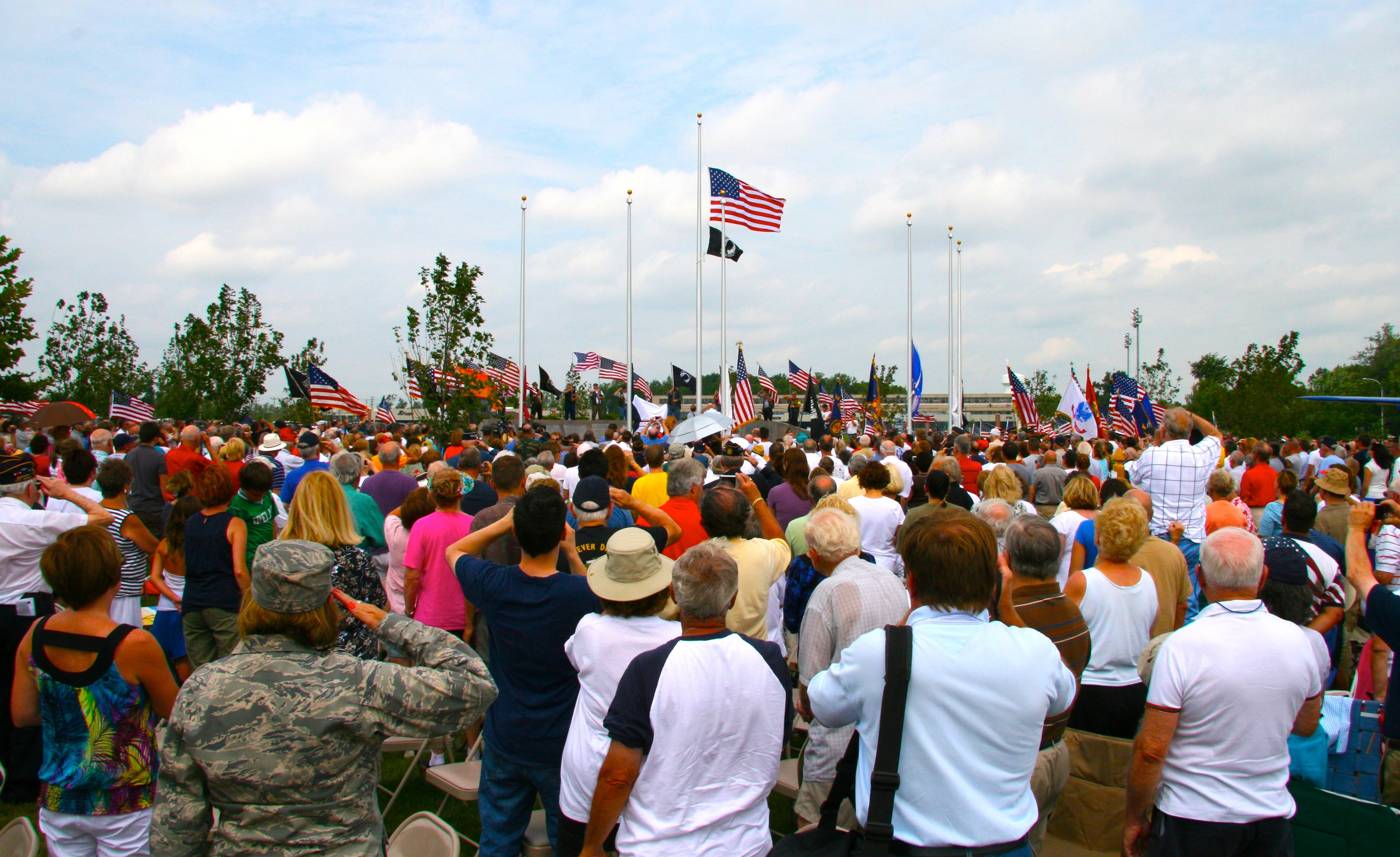
Raising of the U.S. and POW/MIA flags at the Town of Tonawanda Veterans Memorial dedication ceremony, August 18, 2009.

Over 1,500 people convened at Walter M. Kenney Park to witness the ceremony, including area residents, public officials, active military personnel, veterans organizations, and members of the Patriot Guard Riders. Invitations had been sent to those who made financial contributions to fund the memorial, but the event was open to the public and received significant media attention in anticipation of Powell's address.

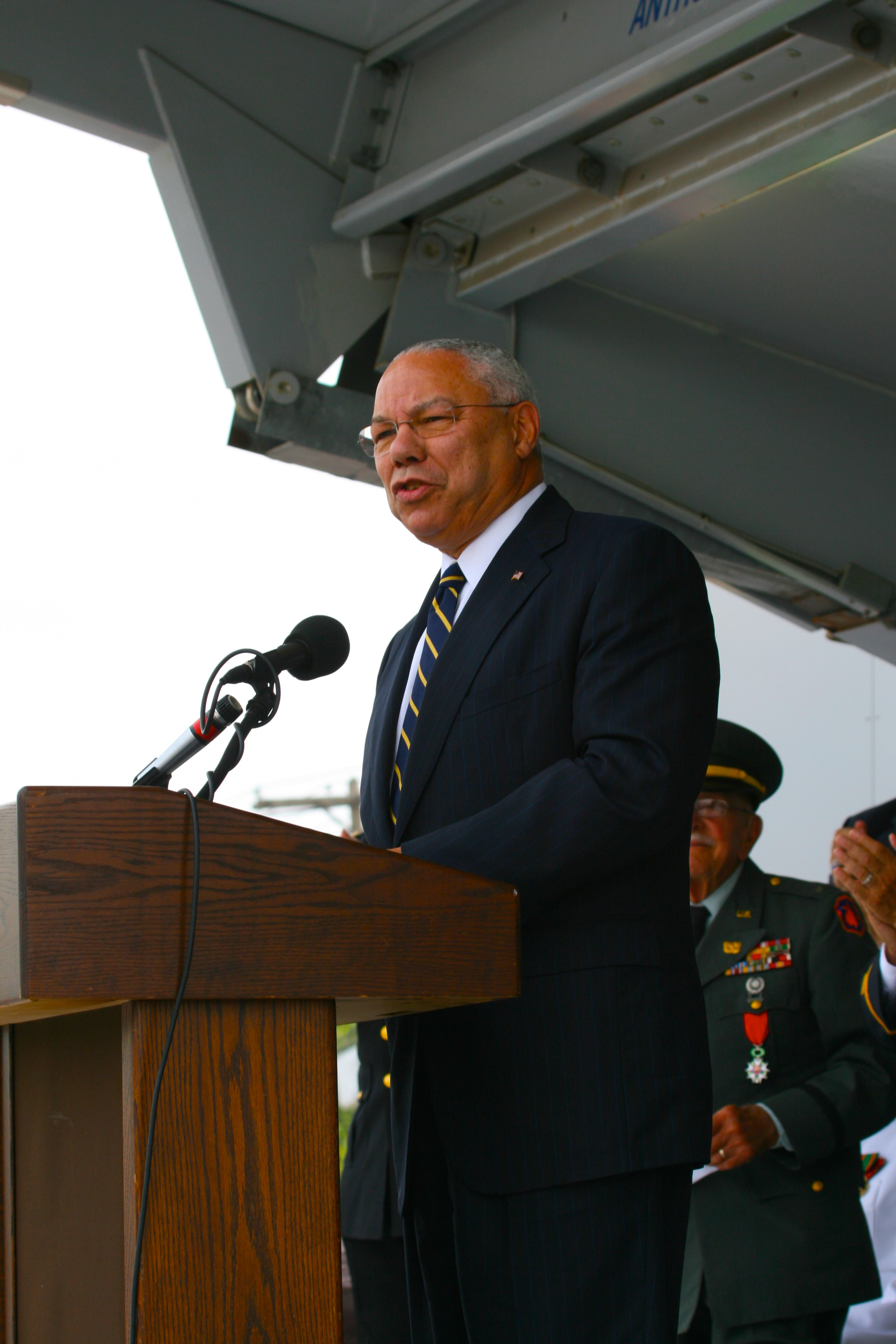
Colin Powell speaks at the Town of Tonawanda Veterans Memorial dedication ceremony, August 18, 2009.

The ceremony featured multiple military, veteran, and police honor guards, a flag raising ceremony, several speeches, and the unveiling of the memorial's V-shaped granite monument. In addition, a member of the memorial steering committee read a letter from U.S. President Barack Obama written to the people of the Town of Tonawanda in recognition of the day's dedication ceremony.

In his keynote address, Powell spoke of the Town of Tonawanda Veterans Memorial as a symbolic gesture of thanks to the military veterans it represents, and as a tool to educate youth on the meaning of military service. He stressed the role of young people in society and acknowledged that it was a teenage Town of Tonawanda resident that initiated the grassroots effort to build the memorial, saying that "sometimes it is the youngest people in our community who understand what's important." Powell further remarked that the memorial's location, in a public park and adjacent to a playground, means that it will be readily visible to local children and that "it will speak to them silently, but powerfully." He also discussed his appreciation of military service throughout the history of the U.S. and of his own military service, including his time leading the Joint Chiefs of Staff.

Powell ended his speech on the topic of government policies aimed at providing services to military veterans, including health care and other benefits. On this, Powell said that offering those services to military veterans is as much a symbol of thanks as a memorial built in their honor.

=== Memorial Expansion ===
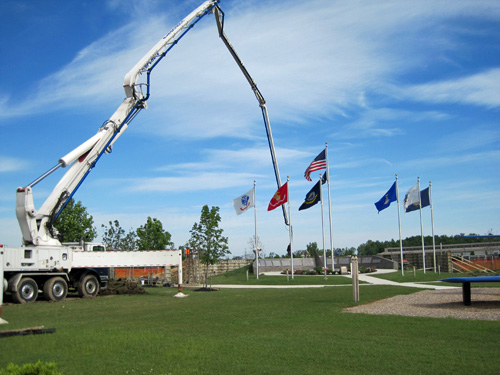

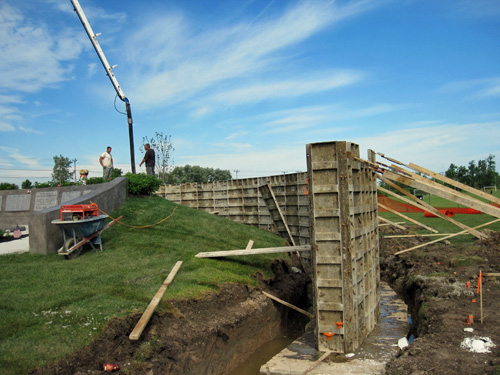
Construction of the second wall.

At the time of its dedication, the memorial listed the names of nearly 500 local military veterans categorized according to their branch of service across 12 granite plaques mounted to the memorial wall. The wall itself was designed to accommodate a total of 1,000 names, with the expectation that names beyond the first 500 would be added to the wall over a period of years following construction. However, it was just months after the dedication ceremony that the wall reached capacity.

By the end of 2009, more names had been submitted for engraving than could be accommodated on the original wall. In light of this, the Town of Tonawanda chose to initiate a second phase of construction to expand the memorial. That expansion took the form of a semicircular wall surrounding the back side of the existing memorial, adding space for up to 2,500 additional names across 30 new granite plaques. Construction began in the spring of 2010 with workers carefully orchestrating the installation of the new wall around existing memorial fixtures.

Work on the second wall finished in time for the town to host a re-dedication ceremony one year after the first, on August 18, 2010.
