= Tonawanda (town), New York =

Tonawanda, New York Tahnawáteh (Tuscarora)
- Town
- Town of Tonawanda
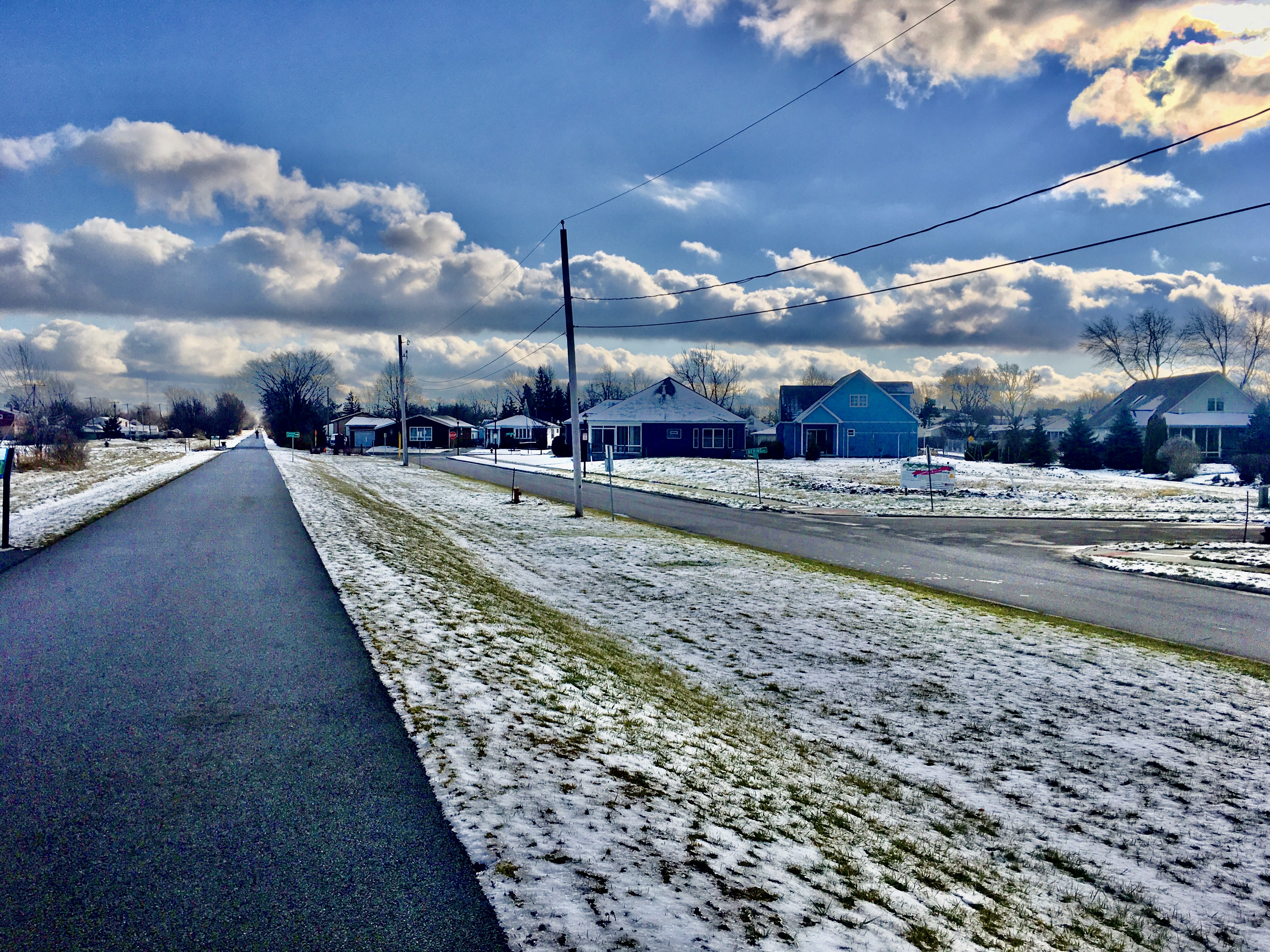
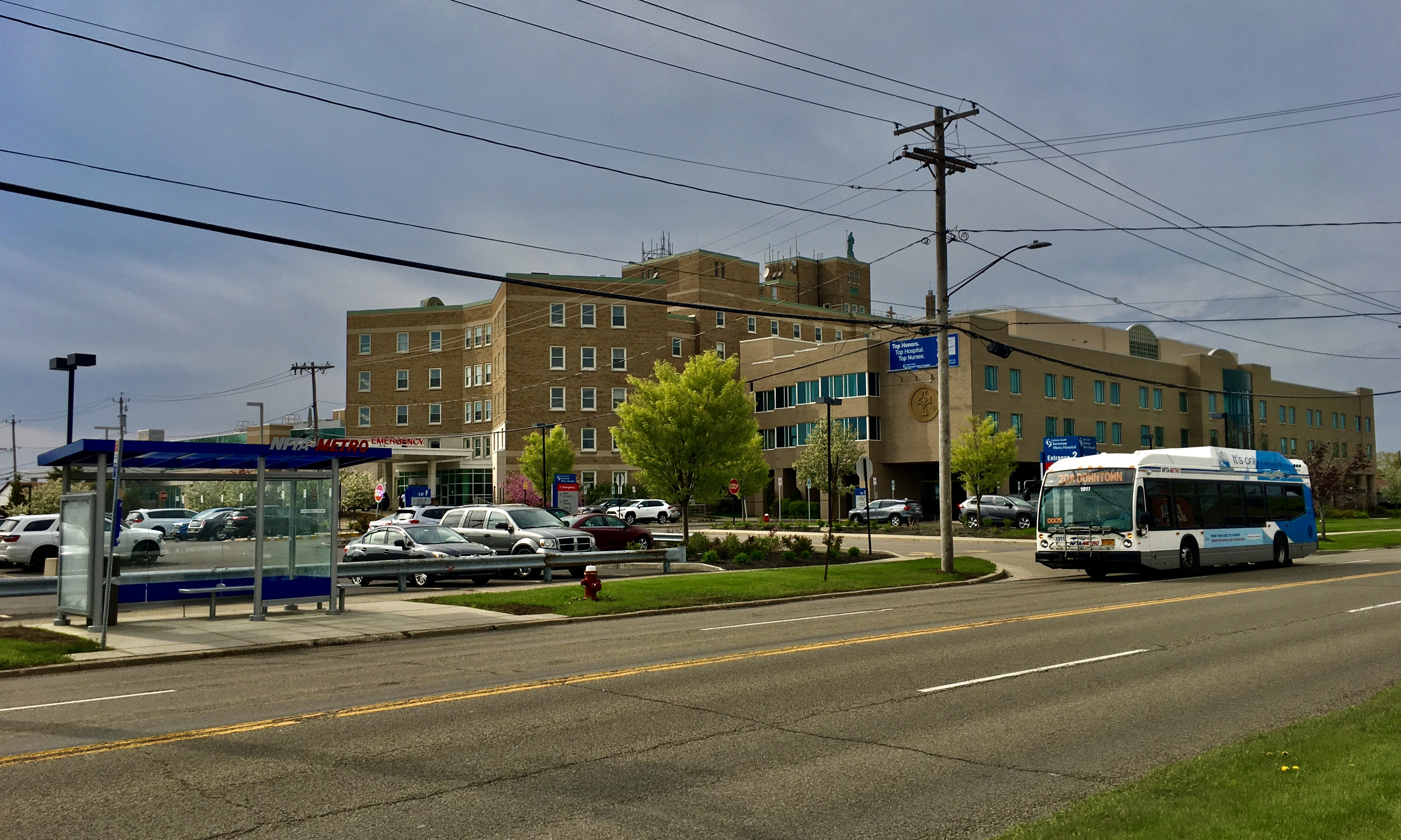
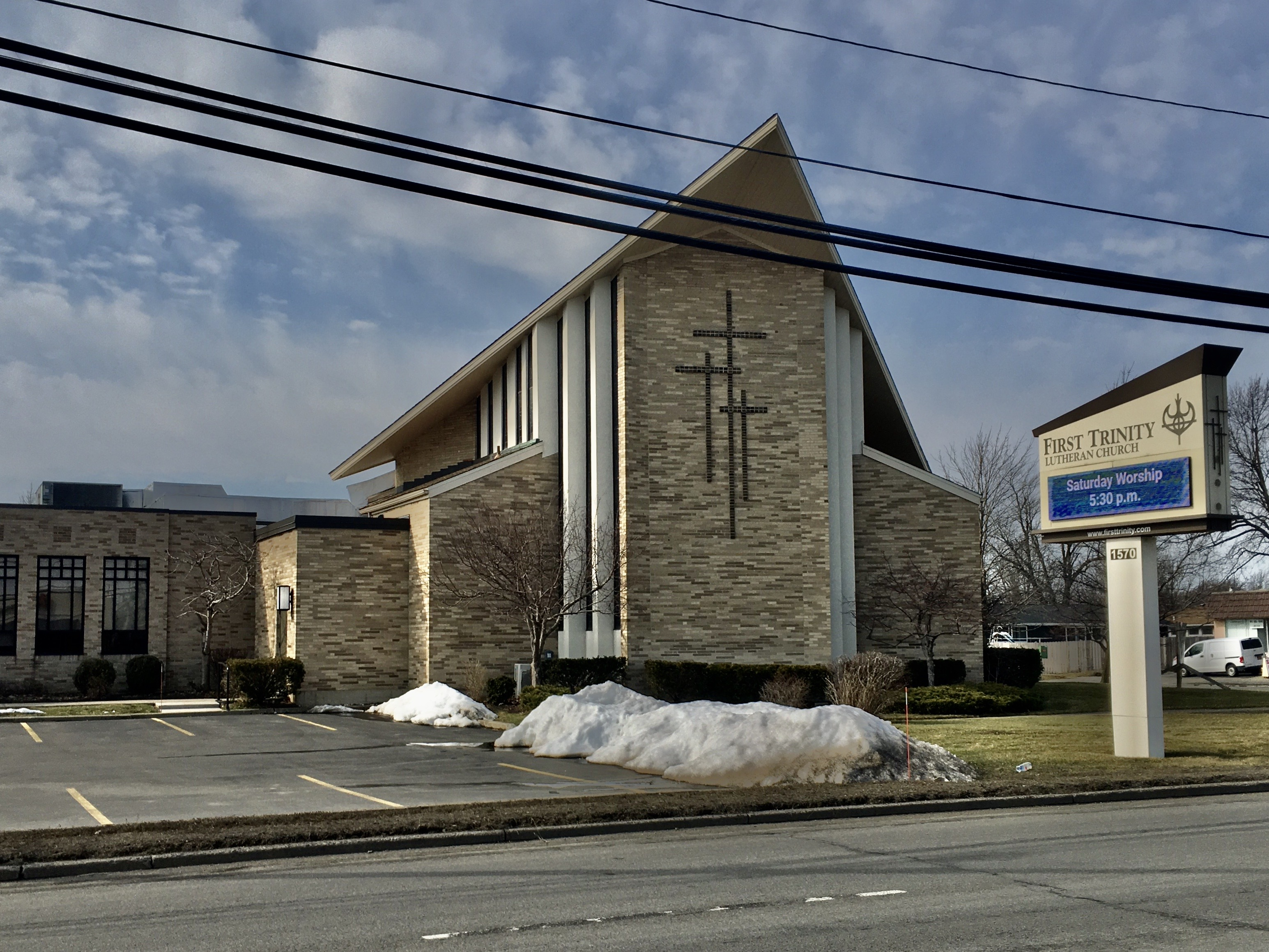

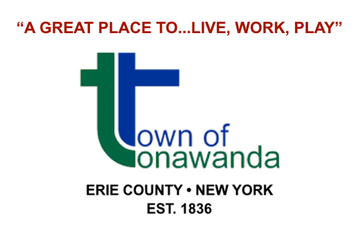
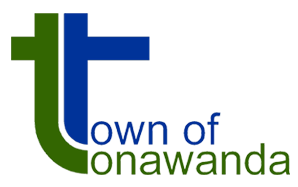
- Flag Seal Logo
- Nickname: Ken-Ton (with Kenmore)
- Motto: A Great Place to...Live, Work, Play
- Location in Erie County and the state of New York
- Coordinates: 42°58′53″N 78°51′19″W
- Country: United States
- State: New York
- County: Erie
- Settlement: 1805
- Established: 1836
- Named for: Swift Waters in Eriechronon

Government
  - Type: Town council
  - Town supervisor: Joseph H. Emminger (D)
  - Town council: Members' List: • John Bargnesi, Jr. (D); • Carl Szarek (D); • Shannon Patch (D); • Jill O'Malley (D)
  - Town Clerk: Marguerite Greco (D)

Area
  - Total: 20.3 sq mi (52.5 km^{2})
  - Land: 18.7 sq mi (48.5 km^{2})
  - Water: 1.5 sq mi (4.0 km^{2})
- Elevation: 617 ft (188 m)

Population (2020)
  - Total: 72,636 ▼
  - Density: 3,927/sq mi (1,516.1/km^{2})
- Time zone: UTC-5 (Eastern (EST))
  - Summer (DST): UTC-4 (EDT)
- ZIP Codes: 14150 (Tonawanda city); 14207 (Buffalo); 14217 (Kenmore); 14223 (Tonawanda town)
- Area code: 716
- FIPS code: 36-75000
- GNIS feature ID: 0979551
- Website: www.tonawanda.ny.us

Tonawanda (formally the Town of Tonawanda; Tuscarora: Tahnawáteh) is a town in Erie County, New York, United States. As of the 2020 census, the town had a population of 72,636. The town is at the north border of the county and is the northern inner ring suburb of Buffalo. It is sometimes referred to, along with its constituent village of Kenmore, as "Ken-Ton". The town was established in 1836, and up to 1903 it included what is now the city of Tonawanda.

== History ==
The Town of Tonawanda is located at the former west-southwest shore of glacial Lake Tonawanda. The lake followed the southern side of the Niagara Escarpment and drained when Lake Erie's hydrological path started to go over Niagara Falls.

This area was under French control from the 17th century until it was ceded to the British after the French and Indian War.

The first European settlers arrived around 1805. Rapid growth began after the construction of the Erie Canal, completed in 1825. Tonawanda occupies the northwest corner of Erie County and is bounded on the north by the Erie Canal, which here follows Tonawanda Creek.

The town of Tonawanda was established in 1836, by separation from the town of Buffalo (now part of the city of Buffalo). At that time it included land that later became part of the town of Grand Island (established 1852) and the entire city of Tonawanda (established 1904).

In 1899, Kenmore incorporated as a village of the town, and remained the town's primary residential and commercial district until the rest of the town was heavily developed into suburban housing in the 1940s and 1950s.

== Geography ==
According to the United States Census Bureau, the town has a total area of 20.3 square miles (52.5 km^{2}), of which 18.7 square miles (48.5 km^{2}) is land and 1.5 square miles (4.0 km^{2}), or 7.61%, is water.

The northern border of the town is the city of Tonawanda and Tonawanda Creek, which is part of the Erie Canal, and the western border is the Niagara River. Ellicott Creek flows parallel to Tonawanda Creek in the northern part of the town, with a confluence just east of the Niagara River. The eastern border, marked by U.S. Route 62 (Niagara Falls Boulevard), is the town of Amherst. Forming the southern border is the village of Kenmore and the city of Buffalo.

=== Adjacent cities and towns ===
- Fort Erie, Ontario - southwest
- City of Buffalo - south
- Town of Amherst - east
- City of North Tonawanda, Niagara County - north
- City of Tonawanda - north
- Town of Grand Island - northwest

=== Major highways ===
- Interstate 190 (Niagara Section) passes through the western part of town from the Buffalo city line to the South Grand Island Bridges onto Grand Island north to Niagara Falls, NY, and Niagara Falls, Ontario.
- Interstate 290 (Youngmann Expressway) travels through the town from I-190 to US 62 and beyond to Amherst.
- U.S. Route 62, north-south highway that marks the east town line as Niagara Falls Boulevard.
- New York State Route 265 (Military Road), north-south highway through western part of town from the Buffalo city line to the city of Tonawanda line.
- New York State Route 266 (River Road), north-south roadway paralleling the Niagara River in the town from the Buffalo city line to the city of Tonawanda line.
- New York State Route 324 (Sheridan Drive, Grand Island Boulevard), east-west highway through the town from Niagara Falls Boulevard (US 62) to River Road (NY 266) where it crosses the South Grand Island Bridge onto Grand Island.
- New York State Route 325 (Sheridan Drive), north-south road from Sheridan Drive/Grand Island Boulevard (NY 324) to River Road (NY 266). It is the only part of Sheridan Drive not signed as NY 324 and continues as Sheridan westward from where it NY 324 becomes Grand Island Boulevard.
- New York State Route 384 (Delaware Avenue), north-south highway in the town from the Kenmore village line to the city of Tonawanda line.
- New York State Route 425 (Twin Cities Memorial Highway), north-south highway in the northern part of town beginning at the I-290 and Colvin Boulevard interchange that heads north into the city of Tonawanda by way of the Twin Cities Memorial Highway.

== Demographics ==
Historical population
| Census | Pop. | Note | %± |
|---|---|---|---|
| 1840 | 1,261 | | — |
| 1850 | 2,072 | | 64.3% |
| 1860 | 2,489 | | 20.1% |
| 1870 | 3,039 | | 22.1% |
| 1880 | 4,969 | | 63.5% |
| 1890 | 521 | | −89.5% |
| 1900 | 1,205 | | 131.3% |
| 1910 | 2,175 | | 80.5% |
| 1920 | 5,505 | | 153.1% |
| 1930 | 25,006 | | 354.2% |
| 1940 | 32,155 | | 28.6% |
| 1950 | 55,270 | | 71.9% |
| 1960 | 105,032 | | 90.0% |
| 1970 | 107,282 | | 2.1% |
| 1980 | 91,269 | | −14.9% |
| 1990 | 82,464 | | −9.6% |
| 2000 | 78,155 | | −5.2% |
| 2010 | 73,567 | | −5.9% |
| 2020 | 72,636 | | −1.3% |
Historical Population Figures

As of the census of 2010, there were 78,155 people, 33,278 households, and 21,164 families residing in the town. The population density was 4,156.3 inhabitants per square mile (1,604.8/km^{2}). There were 34,634 housing units at an average density of 1,841.8 per square mile (711.1/km^{2}). The racial makeup of the town was 93.01% White, 1.41% Black or African American, 0.30% Native American, 0.40% Asian, 1.30% Pacific Islander, 0.36% from other races, and 1.60% from two or more races. Hispanic or Latino of any race were 2.70% of the population.

There were 32,951 households, out of which 22.8% had children under the age of 18 living with them, 43.1% were married couples living together, 11.6% had a female householder with no husband present, and 41.4% were non-families.

== Environmental issues ==
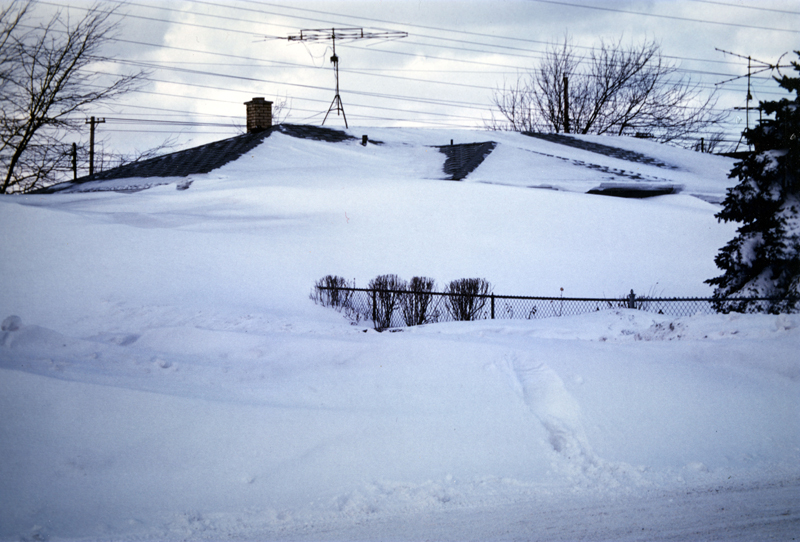
A house almost completely buried in snow in the blizzard of 1977 (January 30, 1977)

In 2009, citizen environmental monitoring of air quality problems resulted in an investigation by the United States Environmental Protection Agency (EPA) into emissions from Tonawanda Coke Corporation (TCC), a producer of foundry coke located on River Road, Tonawanda. In 1998 TCC had been cited by the EPA for violations of oil spill prevention sections of the federal Clean Water Act following contamination of the nearby Niagara River. The investigations into air quality revealed TCC was using an unreported pressure-relief system to vent coke oven gases containing benzene direct to the atmosphere, operating a coke-quenching tower without pollution-control baffles, and dumping hazardous waste in the form of coal tar sludge.

In March 2013 TCC was convicted by a federal jury on 11 counts of violating the Clean Air Act (CAA) and three counts of violating the Resource Conservation and Recovery Act (RCRA). In March 2014 TCC was sentenced in federal court to pay a $12.5 million penalty and $12.2 million in community service payments for the violations. TCC's Environmental Control Manager, Mark L. Kamholz, was convicted of 11 counts of violating the CAA, one count of obstruction of justice and three counts of violating the RCRA, and was sentenced to one year in prison, 100 hours of community service, and a $20,000 fine.

In July 2014 DuPont was fined $440,000 for violations of the CAA at its plant at Sheridan Drive and River Road. The EPA found that the plant had inadequate pollution-control equipment, failed to maintain a monitoring system for the equipment, violated several reporting requirements and underreported air pollution on its annual statements. Emissions from the plant included methyl methacrylate and vinyl fluoride.

== Culture ==
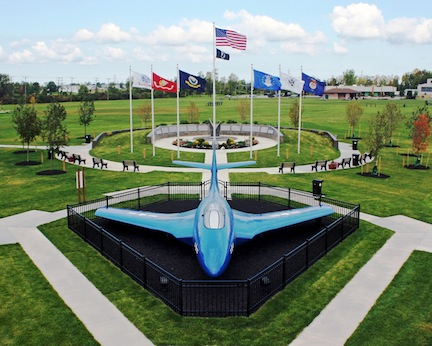
An F9F-6P Cougar sits in front of the Town of Tonawanda Veterans Memorial in Walter M. Kenney Field.

=== Landmarks ===
One of the Town of Tonawanda's best known landmarks is the blue Korean War-era Grumman F9F-6P Cougar Naval airframe displayed in Walter M. Kenney Field at the northwest corner of Brighton Road and Colvin Boulevard. The "blue jet", as it is often called, has been on loan to the town from the U.S. government since May 1959. Immediately behind the F9F-6P airframe is the Town of Tonawanda Veterans Memorial, dedicated on August 18, 2009. Retired U.S. Army General and former U.S. Secretary of State Colin L. Powell delivered the keynote address during the memorial's dedication ceremony before a crowd of more than 1,500.

The Town of Tonawanda Historical Society operates a museum out of a former German Evangelical Church constructed in 1849. This facility, located at 100 Knoche Road, is the oldest public building in the town.

== Notable people ==
- Tom Askey, former NHL goaltender
- Wolf Blitzer, journalist and author, graduated from Kenmore West High School
- Marc A. Coppola, former New York state senator
- William Conrad III, member of the New York State Assembly
- Herbert O. Fisher, chief test pilot for Curtiss-Wright
- Edward Gibson, former astronaut, Skylab 4
- Robert J. H. Kiphuth, former Yale University swimming coach
- Ben Kish, former NFL safety
- Helene Macaulay, celebrity make-up artist
- Joe McCarthy, former Yankees and Hall of Fame manager
- Joe Mesi, former professional boxer
- Van Miller, retired sports announcer
- Henry J. Overbeck, Wisconsin state assemblyman
- Frank Parlato Investigative reporter, publisher
- Fletcher Pratt, writer
- Tam Rose, former head coach of Tonawanda Kardex Lumbermen
- Bill Scherrer, former MLB pitcher, current assistant GM for Chicago White Sox

== Education ==
Tonawonda Town is mostly located in Kenmore-Tonawanda Union Free School District, while a portion is in Sweet Home Central School District.

Tonawanda has two public high schools, both in the Kenmore-Tonawanda UFSD: Kenmore West Senior High School and Kenmore East High School.

The town is also home to St. Joseph's Collegiate Institute, Mount Saint Mary Academy, and Cardinal O'Hara High School.

St. Francis of Assisi School closed in 2014. In January 2014 it had 19 employees and 152 students.

== Communities and locations in the Town of Tonawanda ==
- Brighton – neighborhood by the east town line.
- Brighton Park – park and golf course in the northeast part of the town.
- Ellicott Creek Park – 165-acre (0.67 km^{2}) park operated by the Erie County Department of Parks, Recreation and Forestry.
- Green Acres – neighborhood in the northeast corner of the town.
- Kenilworth – neighborhood in the southeast corner of the town.
- Kenmore – village completely within the borders of the town.
- Lincoln Park – park in the southeast corner of the town.
- Old Town – neighborhood on the western edge of the town, between the industrial area and Niagara River.
- Parkview – neighborhood in the northeast corner of the town, bordering Ellicott Creek Park.
- Sheridan Park – park and golf course in the western part of the town.
- Sheridan Parkside – neighborhood on the western part of the town, just east of Sheridan Park.
- Tonawanda – census-designated place within the town.

== See also ==
- Tonawanda (disambiguation)
