= Tonawanda =

Tonawanda may refer to:

- Tonawanda (CDP), New York, consisting of the Town of Tonawanda less the Village of Kenmore
- Tonawanda (city), New York, officially City of Tonawanda, bordered on three sides by the Town of Tonawanda
- Tonawanda (town), New York, officially Town of Tonawanda in Erie County north of Buffalo, New York
- North Tonawanda, New York, a city in Niagara County, north across Tonawanda Creek from the City and Town
- Tonawanda Armory, listed on the National Register of Historic Places
- Tonawanda Band of Seneca, federally recognized tribe in New York state
- Tonawanda Creek, a tributary of the Niagara River and part of the Erie Canal
- Tonawanda Engine, a General Motors engine factory in Buffalo, New York
- Tonawanda Kardex Lumbermen, a defunct NFL team based in North Tonawanda
- Tonawanda Reservation, on Tonawanda Creek in Erie, Genesee, and Niagara counties
- Lake Tonawanda, prehistoric glacial lake
- Jackie Tonawanda, American female boxer
