= Sweet Home Central School District =

New York State public school district

Location
- Amherst, New York

District information
- Motto: In pursuit of lifelong learning
- Grades: K-12
- Superintendent: Michael Ginestre
- Schools: 7

Students and staff
- District mascot: Panthers

Other information
- Website: Official website

Sweet Home Central School District is a New York State public school district that serves the towns of Amherst and Tonawanda, New York of Erie County. The school district serves about 4,000 students in seven schools including one high school, one middle school, four elementary schools, and one alternative school.

== Administration ==
The District offices are located at 1901 Sweet Home Road in Amherst. The current Superintendent is Michael Ginestre.

== Sweet Home High School ==
Sweet Home High School
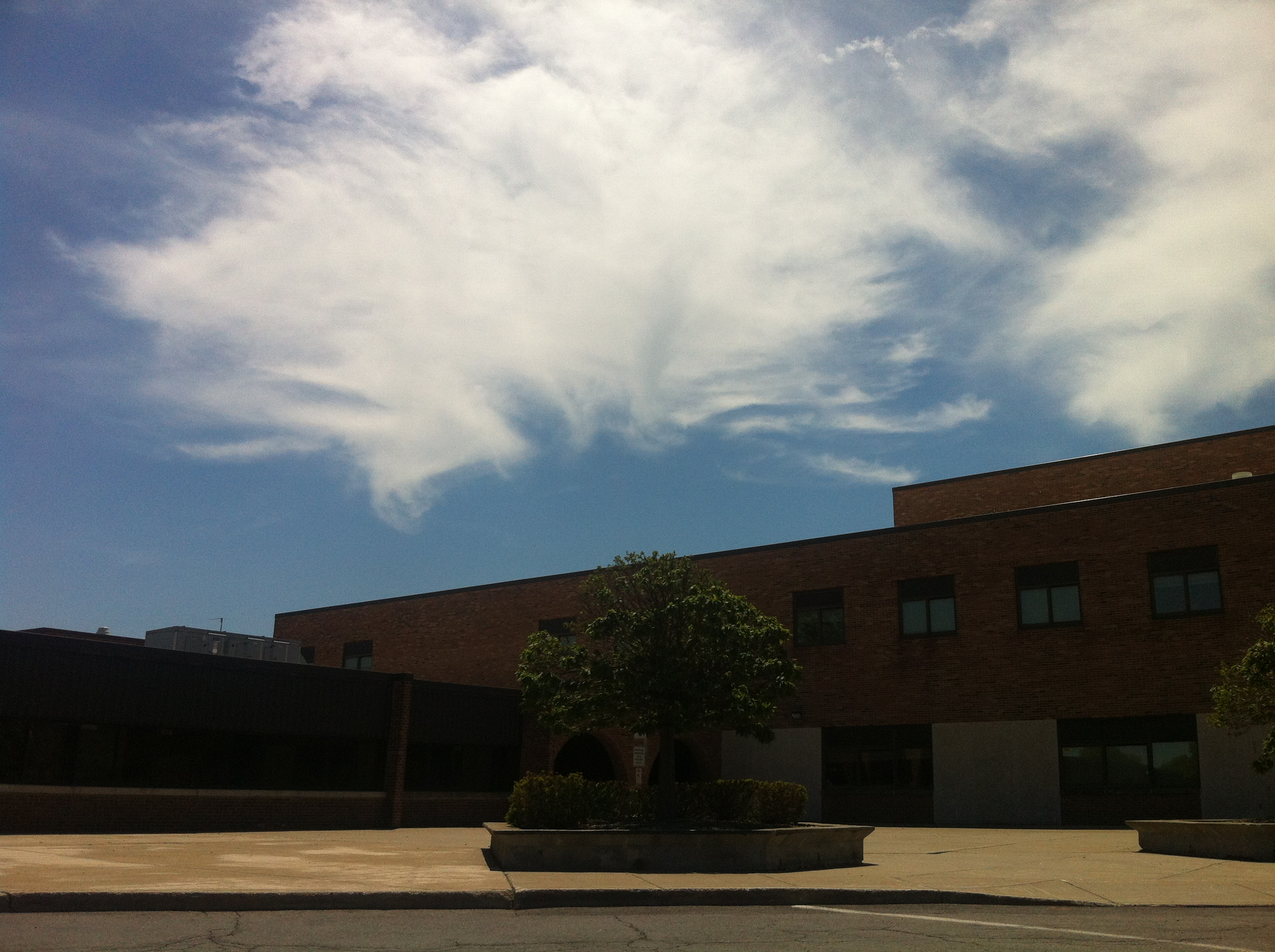

Location
- 1901 Sweet Home Road; Amherst, Erie, New York 14228

Information
- Principal: Derek Baker
- Grades: 9-12
- Website: Sweet Home High School

Sweet Home High School is located at 1901 Sweet Home Road in Amherst and serves grades 9-12. The current principal is Derek Baker.

=== History ===
Sweet Home High School was built in 1957 (the cornerstone laid on May 24, 1958 has 1957 inscribed on it) as Sweet Home Junior-Senior High School. The school opened on September 8, 1958, and was dedicated on May 17, 1959.

== Sweet Home Middle School ==
Sweet Home Middle School
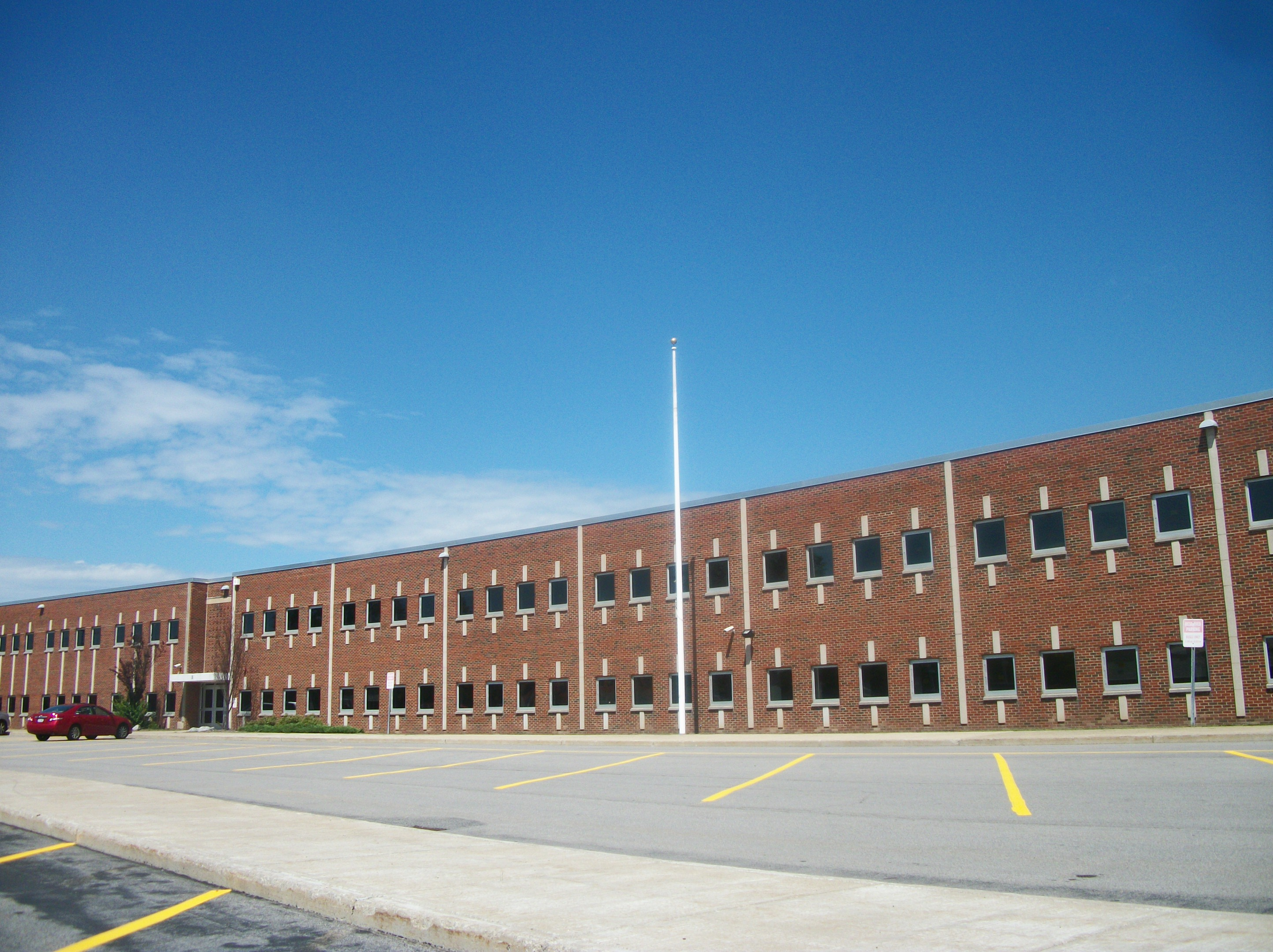
- 4150 Maple Road; Amherst, Erie, New York 14228

Information
- Principal: Marissa Dauria
- Grades: 6-8
- Website: Sweet Home Middle School

Sweet Home Middle School is located at 4150 Maple Road and serves grades 6 through 8. The current principal is Marissa Dauria.

=== History ===
Sweet Home Middle School was built in 1963 as Sweet Home Junior High School. The cornerstone was laid on June 14, 1963, the building opened on September 4, 1963, and was dedicated on November 22, 1964.

== Glendale Elementary School ==
Glendale Elementary School
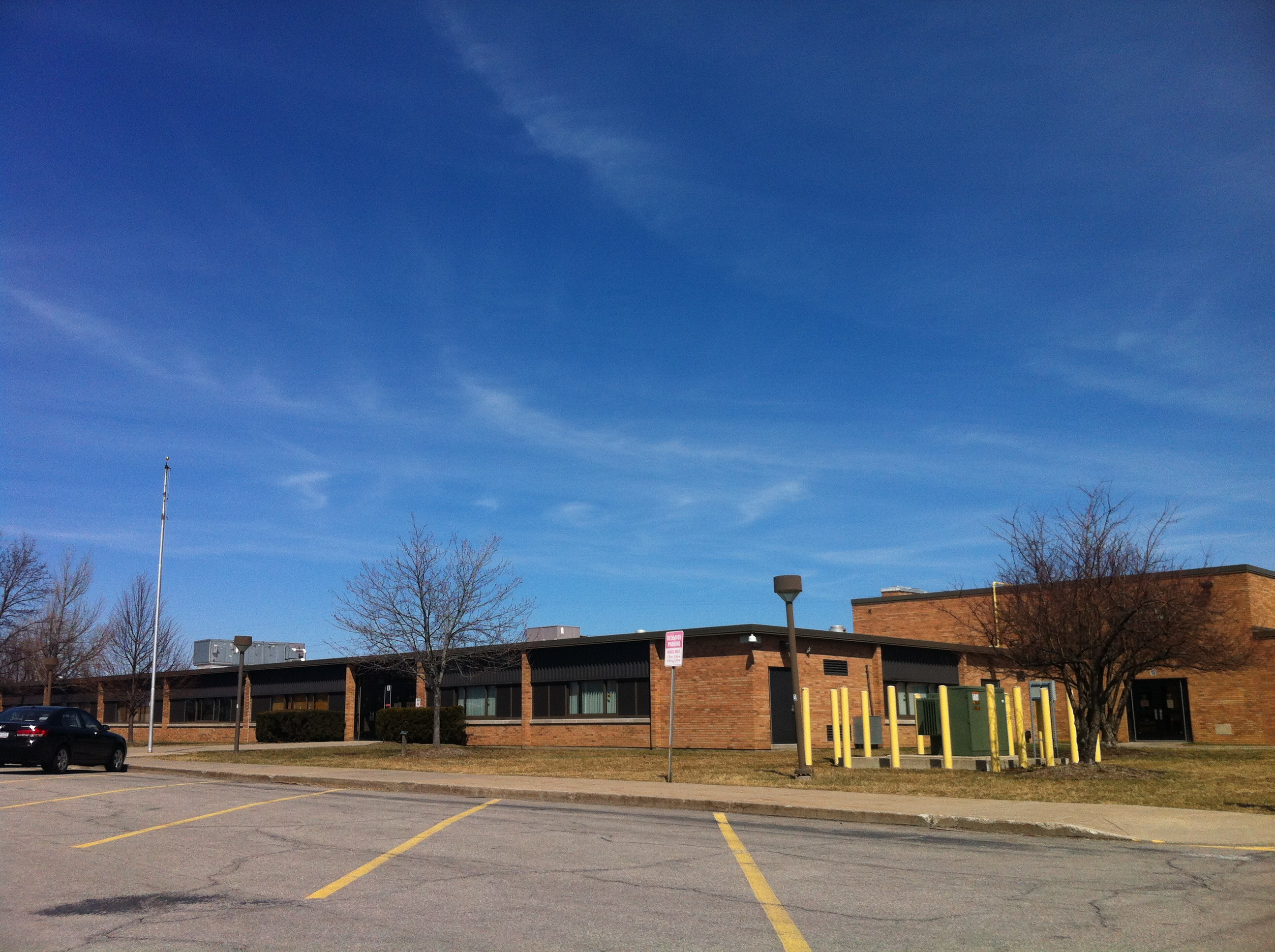

Location
- 101 Glendale Drive; Tonawanda, Erie, New York 14150

Information
- Opened: September 6, 1961
- Principal: Joleen Dimitroff
- Grades: K-5
- Website: Glendale Elementary School

Glendale Elementary School is located at 101 Glendale Drive in Tonawanda and serves grades K through 5. The current principal is Joleen Dimitroff.

=== History ===
Glendale Elementary School was built in 1960 (the cornerstone laid on June 10, 1961 has 1960 inscribed on it). The building opened on September 6, 1961, and was dedicated on October 8, 1961.

== Heritage Heights Elementary School ==
Heritage Heights Elementary School
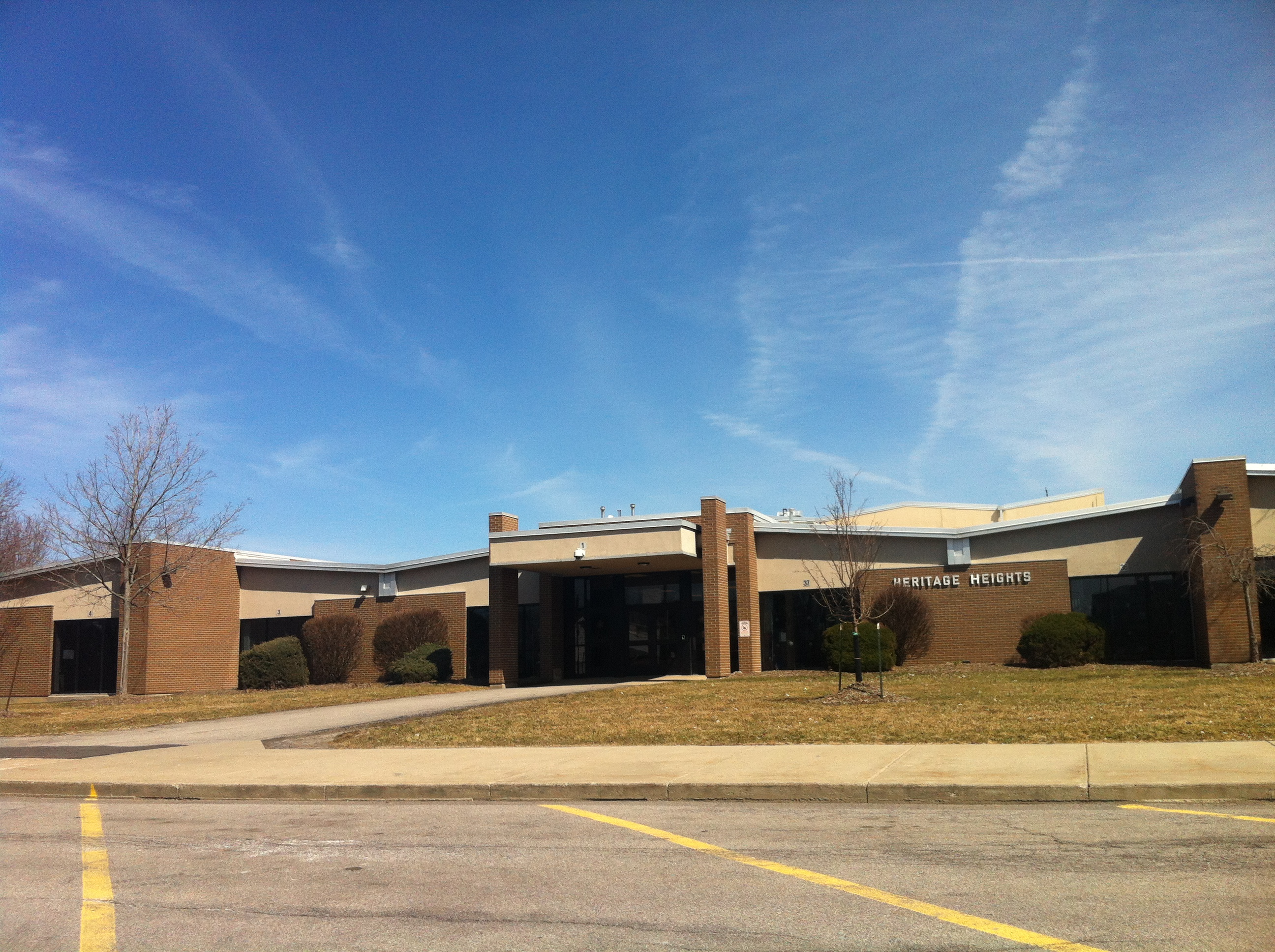

Location
- 2545 Sweet Home Road; Amherst, Erie, New York 14228

Information
- Principal: Antonio Perry
- Grades: K-5
- Website: Heritage Heights Elementary School

Heritage Heights Elementary School is located at 2545 Sweet Home Road in Amherst and serves Grades K through 5. The current principal is Antonio Perry.

=== History ===
Heritage Heights Elementary School was built in 1971. The cornerstone was laid on May 22, 1971, the building opened on September 8, 1971, and was dedicated on December 4, 1971. The school was originally constructed as an "open school", meaning that there were no permanent walls dividing classrooms. Eventually, concrete walls would be installed in each room. Grade levels are divided into separate pods at different corners of the building.

The original Principal Dr. David Ebert led an amazing staff of educators in a new way of "team" teaching. While the kindergarten area was designed for two separate classrooms, there was a large playroom that adjoined the two classrooms for indoor playtime. Originally, the classrooms were designed in grade clusters, with a single entry area, and bi-fold soundproof walls between four classrooms per cluster. Classes would often have their own instruction time in the mornings, and while the students were at one of the two lunch areas, teachers would open the bi-fold doors, and take turns teaching the afternoons' common class. Each classroom had sliding doors that allowed classes to experience more of the outdoors, and environment around them. The original sandbox in the playground was created with vertical logs, with a huge sandpit in the middle. A few years later, tennis courts and summer art programs for the students were installed.

In January 2014 Heritage Heights was up for closing because of being too expensive to run. After one Board of Education meeting in March 2014, it was decided that Heritage Heights would stay open on a 5 to 2 vote.

== Maplemere Elementary School ==
Maplemere Elementary School
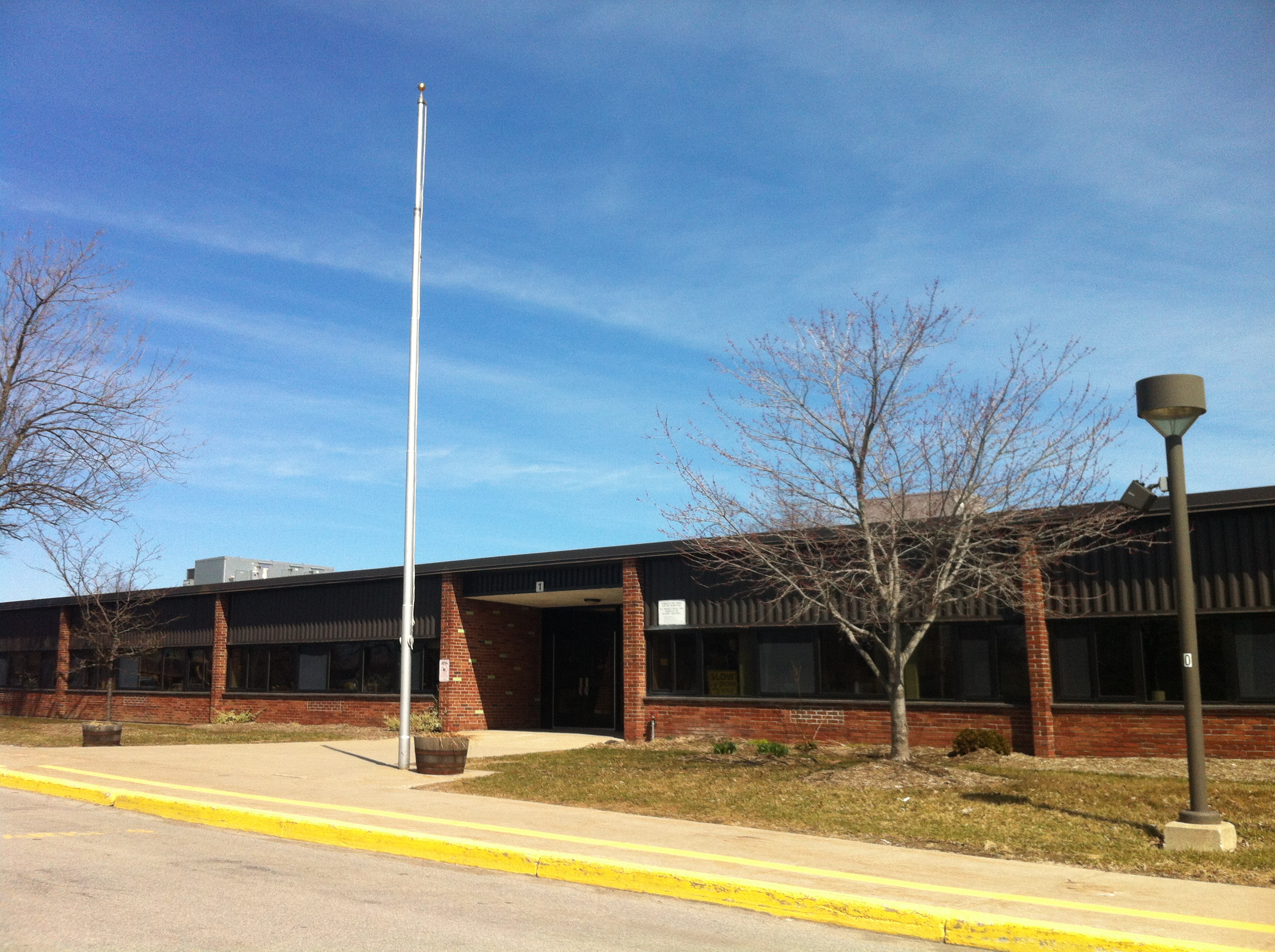

Location
- 236 East Maplemere Road; Amherst, Erie, New York 14221

Information
- Principal: James P. Ryan
- Grades: K-5
- Website: Maplemere Elementary School

Maplemere Elementary School is located at 236 East Maplemere Road in Amherst and serves grades K through 5. The current principal is James Ryan.

=== History ===
Maplemere Elementary School was built in 1961 (the cornerstone laid on May 26, 1962 has 1961 inscribed on it) and opened on September 5, 1962. The school was dedicated on November 11, 1962.

== Willow Ridge Elementary School ==
Willow Ridge Elementary School
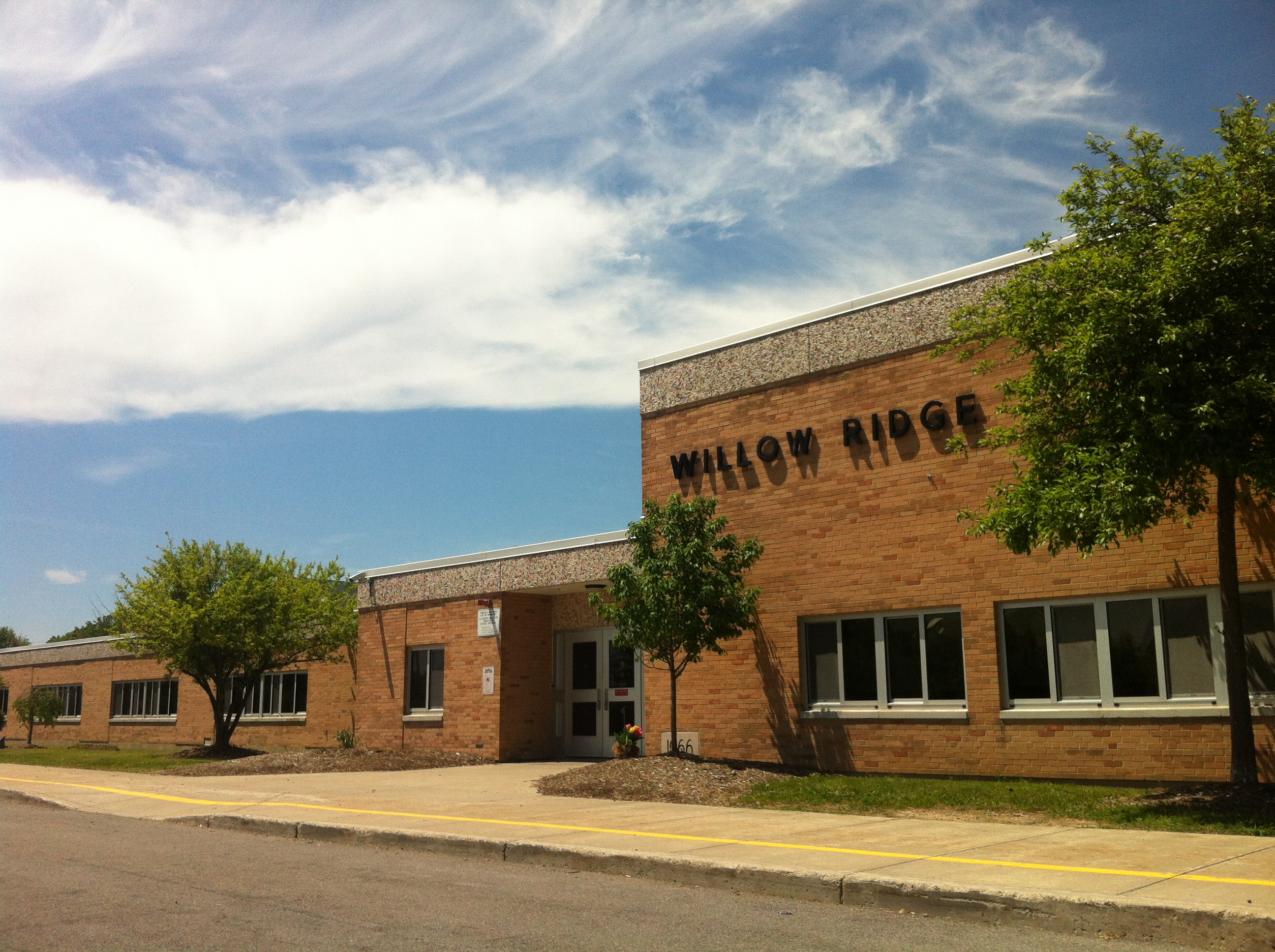

Location
- 480 Willow Ridge Drive; Amherst, Erie, New York 14228

Information
- Principal: Robert C. Polino
- Grades: K-5
- Website: Willow Ridge Elementary School

Willow Ridge Elementary School is located at 480 Willow Ridge Road and serves Grades K through 5. The current principal is Robert Polino.

=== History ===
Willow Ridge Elementary School was built and opened on September 7, 1966. The cornerstone was laid on May 21, 1966.

== Other ==
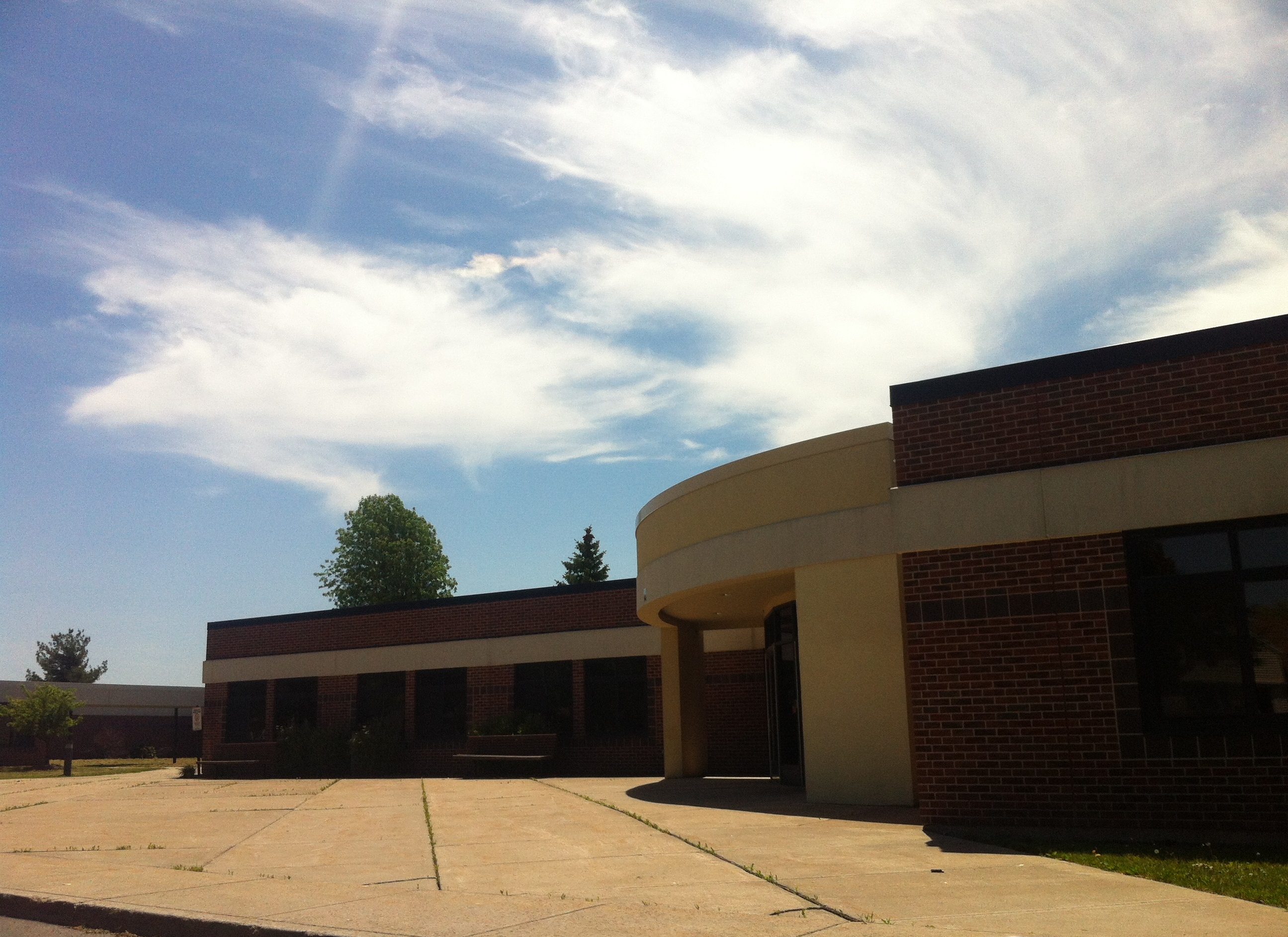
Dexter Terrace School

- Dexter Terrace Elementary School - Cornerstone laid on June 13, 1959. Opened on September 9, 1959, dedicated on May 22, 1960 and closed on June 30, 1988.
