= Grumman F-9 Cougar =

US Navy carrier-based fighter aircraft in service 1952-1974

F9F/F-9 Cougar
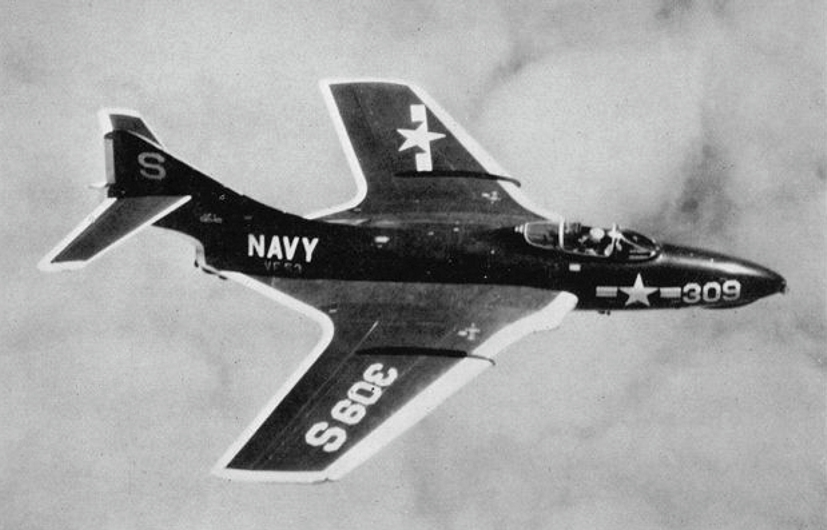
- Grumman F9F-6 Cougar, 1952

General information
- Type: Fighter aircraft
- National origin: United States
- Manufacturer: Grumman
- Status: Retired
- Primary users: United States Navy United States Marine Corps; Argentine Navy
- Number built: 1,988

History
- Introduction date: December 1952
- First flight: 20 September 1951
- Retired: 1974 (US Navy)
- Developed from: Grumman F9F Panther

The Grumman F9F/F-9 Cougar is a carrier-based jet-powered fighter aircraft designed and produced by the American aircraft manufacturer Grumman.

It was developed during the early 1950s on behalf of the United States Navy (US Navy) and United States Marine Corps (USMC), which were keen to quickly introduce a naval fighter equipped with a swept wing. Grumman's design team decided to adapt its earlier F9F Panther, replacing the straight wing of the Panther with a new swept wing. Thrust was also increased with the installation of a newer and more powerful engine. Nevertheless, the aircraft remained limited to subsonic speeds. The first prototype (XF9F-6), which was produced by modifying an existing Panther, performed its maiden flight on 20 September 1951. The Navy considered the Cougar to be an updated version of the Panther, despite having a different official name, and thus Cougars started off from F9F-6.

During December 1952, the F9F-6 was introduced to service, VF-32 being the first squadron to receive the type; while developed at a relatively rapid pace, the Cougar's arrival was too late for it to engage in active combat during the Korean War. While initial production aircraft were powered by a single Pratt & Whitney J48 turbojet engine, the F9F-7 were furnished by an Allison J33 powerplant instead. In the mid 1950s, the improved F9F-8 was introduced, which had a lower stall speed, improved handling when flown at high angles of attack, and increased range. The twin-seat F9F-8T was procured by the US Navy to perform various forms of training. The F9F-8P photo-reconnaissance variant was created by converting existing F9F-8s; most of the modifications were made to the aircraft's nose.

On 1 April 1954, US Navy Cougars established a new transcontinental crossing record. The US Navy's flight demonstration team, the Blue Angels, adopted the type in place of its Panthers. The Cougar gained a favorable reputation as a highly maneuverable and easy to fly aircraft. The only foreign air service that operated the Cougar was the Argentine Naval Aviation. The F9F-8 was withdrawn from front-line duties during the late 1950s, having been replaced by more capable aircraft such as the F11F Tigers and F8U Crusaders. While the Naval Reserves flew Cougars into the mid-1960s, only the TF-9J trainer model saw actual combat, having been deployed as a Forward Air Control aircraft during the Vietnam War. Following its withdrawal from active service, many F9F-6s were used as unmanned drones for combat training, designated F9F-6D, or as drone controllers, designated F9F-6K.

== Design and development ==
=== Early development ===
Rumors that the Soviet Union had produced a swept wing fighter had circulated a year before the Mikoyan-Gurevich MiG-15 first appeared at air shows in 1949. Despite the level of activity taking place with swept wing aircraft, the US Navy was not initially focused on the development of such aircraft. This was largely because the US Navy's focus at the time was defending the battle group against high speed, high altitude bombers with interceptors, as well as escorting medium-range carrier-based bombers in all weather conditions; air-to-air combat was of less interest at that time. Nonetheless, the US Navy appreciated the importance of getting a capable carrier-based swept wing jet fighter. Grumman was awarded a contract for the development of a swept-wing fighter jet in early 1951. The arrival of the MiG-15, which easily outclassed straight-wing fighters in the air war over North Korea, was a major factor.

Development proceeded at a relatively rapid pace, in part due to Grumman's pre-existing experience of studying prospective derivatives of the Panther guiding several of their design choices. One example of this was the design team's decision to retain the center fuselage section of the Panther relatively unchanged, as studies of various alternative arrangements had been determined to have introduced center of gravity issues that in turn would have compelled substantial redesigns of other elements of the aircraft, including its propulsion. Instead, the aircraft shared the Panther's engine, landing gear, and various other systems. By changing as little as possible, the company was able to produce a swept wing fighter for the US Navy in mere months, rather than the years involved in delivering a clean-sheet design.

However, it was necessary to implement various design changes. To effectively accommodate the switch from a straight wing to a swept one, it was necessary to delete the two 120-gallon tip tanks, as in combination with the swept wing there would have been too great a negative impact upon the aircraft's center of gravity; for the same reason, only a single hardpoint was fitted under each wing. Instead, internal fuel tanks housed within the wing were adopted, although these had less capacity than the tip tanks had. The leading edge flaps present on the Panther were deleted in favour of slats, while the trailing edge slats and fuselage-mounted flaps were both redesigned to be effective with the swept wing. The modified fuselage flaps could also function as a second set of air brakes.

=== Early flights ===
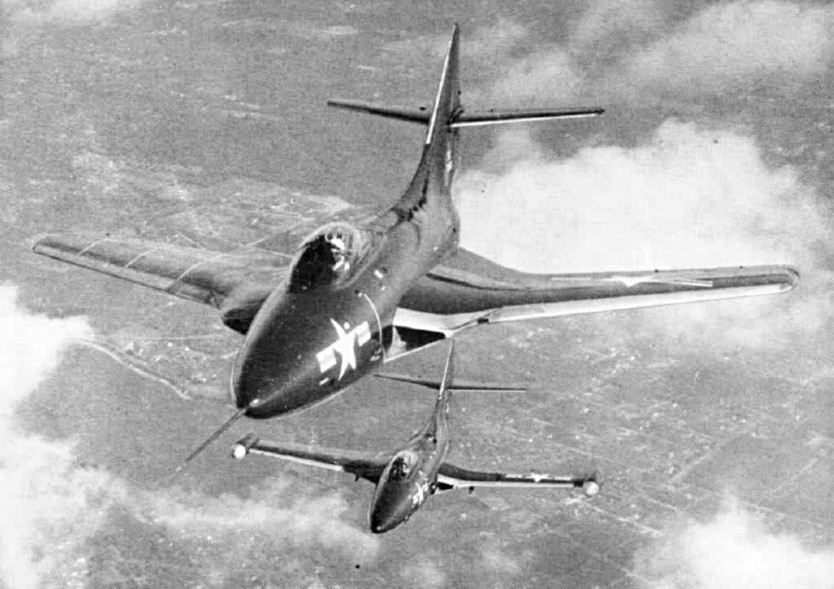
A swept-wing F9F-6 Cougar (foreground) and a straight-wing F9F-5 Panther in flight

Three XF9F-6 prototypes, two airworthy and one static test airframe, were rapidly produced by modifying existing Panthers straight off the production line. On 20 September 1951, the first prototype conducted its maiden flight, piloted by Grumman test pilot Fred Rowley, only six months following the contract's awarding. Few meaningful problems were encountered during flight testing, most being quickly resolved or accepted on the basis of the perceived urgency for such an aircraft to be made available. The Cougar proved itself to be a definitive step forward; some pilots claimed the type to have superior handling at approach speeds than the preceding Panther. In a full-power vertical dive, it could break the sound barrier without experiencing buffeting or major undesirable flight characteristics. In level flight, the aircraft remained only capable of subsonic flight, however, the critical Mach number was increased from 0.79 to 0.86 at sea level, and to 0.895 at 35,000 ft (10,000 m), thus delivering performance markedly superior to that of its predecessor.

However, both roll and pitch control were deemed to not satisfy the requirements. The original roll control arrangement, a combination of unboosted ailerons and hydraulically-actuated spoilers (referred to as "flaperons"), were insufficient when operated via mechanical linkage alone without hydraulic pressure, thus were redesigned. Wing fences were added and the spoilers extended from the fences to the tips of the wing, while the flaperons were divided into two halves, the inbound set being powered by a separate hydraulic system.

Pitch control was initially achieved via a conventional elevator and horizontal stabilizer, the rudder pedals controlled the section of the rudder beneath the horizontal tail surface, while the upper portion of the rudder was controlled by a yaw damper. However, this arrangement was unsuited to high speed flight, thus a powered "flying tail" was adopted. As such, the Cougar was capable of flying safely and easily even without the upper portion of the tail being present.

=== F9F-6 ===
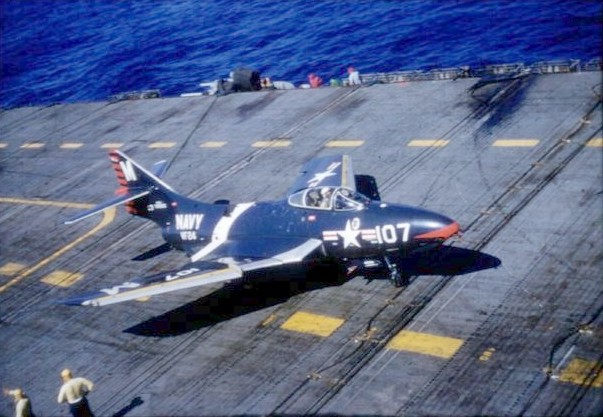
An F9F-6 of VF-24 on USS Essex in 1955

The initial production model was the F9F-6; a total of 646 airframes were delivered between mid-1952 and July 1954. The F9F-6 first flew on 20 September 1951, seven months after Grumman signed a contract with the Navy for swept-wing fighter. The engine was the Pratt & Whitney J42, a licensed version of the Rolls-Royce Nene. The first 30 production aircraft had the same J42 P-6 engine as the F9F-5; the rest had the more powerful J42 P-8 with 7,250 lbf (32.2 kN) of thrust.

Armament was four 20 mm (.79 in) AN/M3 cannons in the nose and provisions for two 1,000 lb (450 kg) bombs or 150 US gal (570 L) drop tanks under the wings. Most were fitted with a UHF homing antenna under the nose, and some were fitted with probes for inflight refuelling. The F9F-6 used an Aero 5D-1 weapons sight with an APG-30A gun-ranging radar. The F9F-6 was later designated F-9F in 1962. Sixty were built as F9F-6P reconnaissance aircraft with cameras instead of the nose cannon.

After withdrawal from active service, many F9F-6s were used as unmanned drones for combat training, designated F9F-6D, or as drone controllers, designated F9F-6K. The F9F-6K and the F9F-6D were redesignated the QF-9F and DF-9F, respectively.

=== F9F-7 ===
The F9F-7 referred to the next batch of Cougars that were given the Allison J33 also found in the F9F-4, instead of the Pratt & Whitney J48. A total of 168 were built, but the J33 proved both less powerful and less reliable than the J48. Almost all were retrofitted with the J48 engine, and were thus indistinguishable from F9F-6s. These were redesignated F-9H in 1962.

==== Flexible deck testing ====
The Navy used two modified F9F-7s to conduct experiments landing on British-inspired flexible decks which did not require the use of landing gear. The reasoning was that since an airplane's landing gear comprises some 33% of the total weight, a plane without landing gear would gain a greater range and would be able to carry more ordnance. The aircraft were fitted with a 3-inch-deep (76 mm) false bottom under the center fuselage to help balance the plane during landings on the flex-deck made up of a lubricated rubberized fabric. The deck, built by Goodyear was 1/2 inch (13 mm) thick and featured several arresting cables. The planes were launched using a ramp and a handling dolly which served as temporary landing gear. The two F9F-7 aircraft in the test were equipped with the powerful J48-P8 engine instead of the Allison J33 engine originally used with the F9F-7. While the landing tests yielded positive results and proved that landing was clearly possible, the project was terminated in 1955 as it would have been difficult to move the aircraft around the carrier deck once they landed. It also required a highly skilled pilot to perform the landings and would have made it impossible to divert to a land base if necessary.

=== F9F-8 ===
Work on the F9F-8 began in April 1953 with three goals: lower the airplane's stall speed, improve aircraft control at high angles of attack, and increase range. It featured an 8 in (20 cm) stretch in the fuselage and modified wings with a greater chord, an increased area (from 300 to 337 square foot (27.9 to 31.3 m^{2})), and a dogtooth. The airframe changes improved low-speed and high angle of attack flying, and gave more room for fuel tanks. The top speed was 704 mph (1,133 km/h) and minimum catapult speed was lowered to 127 knots (235 km/h; 146 mph). It also was now capable of breaking the sound barrier in a steep dive. All four ammunition boxes were mounted above the guns, in contrast to the split location of most previous F9Fs including the Panther. Visibility, which was already very good, was improved with the F9F-8. 601 aircraft were delivered between April 1954 and March 1957. Late production F9F-8 aircraft were given the ability to carry four AIM-9 Sidewinder air-to-air missiles under the wings (the first Navy aircraft to deploy with the missiles). Most earlier aircraft were later modified to carry Sidewinders. A number were given also nuclear bombing equipment. The F9F-8 was redesignated F-9J in 1962. The F9F-8B aircraft were F9F-8s converted into attack fighters, later redesignated AF-9J. The Navy acquired 377 two-seat F9F-8T trainers between 1956 and 1960. They were used for advanced training, weapons training, and carrier training, and served until 1974. They were armed with twin 20 mm (.79 in) cannon and could carry a full bombs or missiles load. In the 1962 redesignation, these were later called TF-9J.

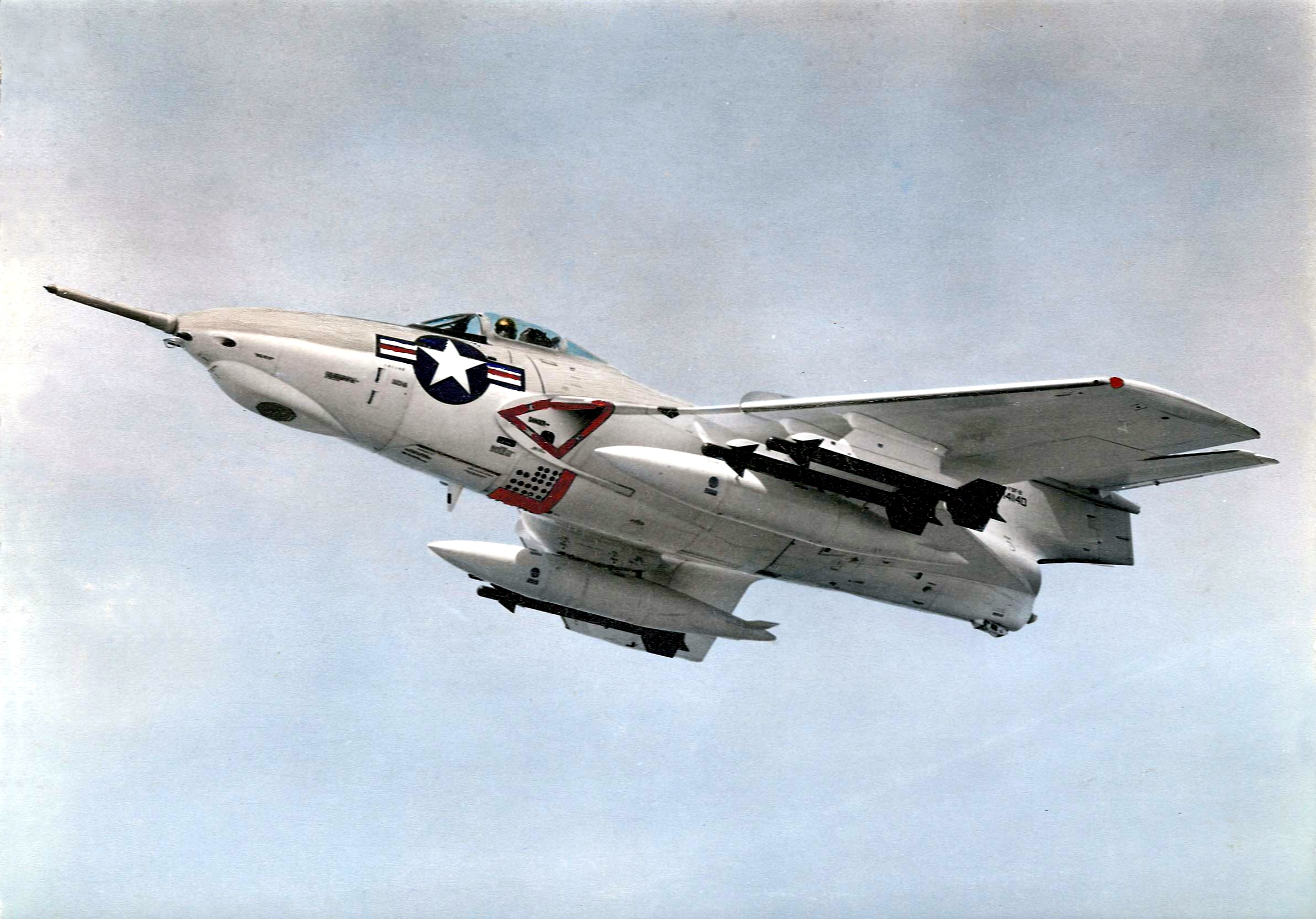
The F9F-8 was fitted with an inflight refueling probe and Sidewinder missiles.

==== Aerial reconnaissance ====
A total of 110 F9F-8Ps (photo-reconnaissance) were produced with an extensively modified nose carrying cameras. They were withdrawn after 1960 to reserve squadrons. In 1962, remaining F9F-6P and F9F-8P aircraft were re-designated RF-9F and RF-9J respectively.

Modifications of F9F-8 to convert to F9F-8P:

- The modification to eliminate the guns and related equipment, while incorporating the photographic equipment, automatic pilot, and their controls and instruments, has resulted in the following changes:
- Rearrangement of electronics equipment installed in the area enclosed by the fuselage nose section, lengthening of this section by 12 inches (30 cm), and shortening of the sliding nose section.
- Rearrangement of the left and right consoles and the main instrument panel to provide space for the controls associated with the additional equipment.
- Some minor changes of the fuselage structure and equipment installations to provide for the necessary ducting control for hot air from the engine compressor, which is used for defrosting the camera windows and heating the camera compartment.
- Removal of all armament, the Armament Control System, and the AN/APG-30 radar system, and installation of an additional armor plate bulkhead.
- Installation of 14 Fairchild high speed cameras

=== Flight characteristics and deployment ===
The F9F was known to be highly maneuverable and easy to fly. Corky Meyer, who flew both the F9F Cougar and North American FJ-3 Fury, noted that compared to the latter the Cougar had a higher dive speed limit (Mach 1.2 vs Mach 1), a higher maneuvering limit of 7.5-g (compared to 6-g), and greater endurance.

"[The] Combat Air patrol mission was for two hours on station at 150 nmi (280 km) from the carrier. This required 2+30 takeoff, cruise, and landing endurance plus reserves. The F9F-6 could perform a three-hour CAP mission on internal fuel. The FJ-2 and -3 with external tanks had less than 1+30 mission time and the FJ-4 just met the mission requirement."

The F9F Cougar was also a capable multi-role aircraft, which may explain why it was deployed less often than dedicated fighters. In spite of engine problems that plagued the FJ-3, it was deployed for a longer period than the F9F Cougar. This was more likely attributable to the fact the F9F had an attack role that was being superseded by new jets such as A4D-1 Skyhawk, rather than any deficiency as a fighter.

"The reason the FJ-3 was deployed a little longer and a little more often (19 times vs 16) in fighter squadrons than the F9F-8 probably wasn't because it was the better fighter. More likely it was because it has a minimal capability as an attack aircraft, whereas the F9F-8 was good for that too, including nuclear weapon delivery. In effect the F9F-8 was a jet attack placeholder along with the F7U-3M, while the pipeline was being filled with the FJ-4Bs and A4Ds. As a result, the FJ-3 was the designated day fighter by default on most deployments."

== Operational history ==
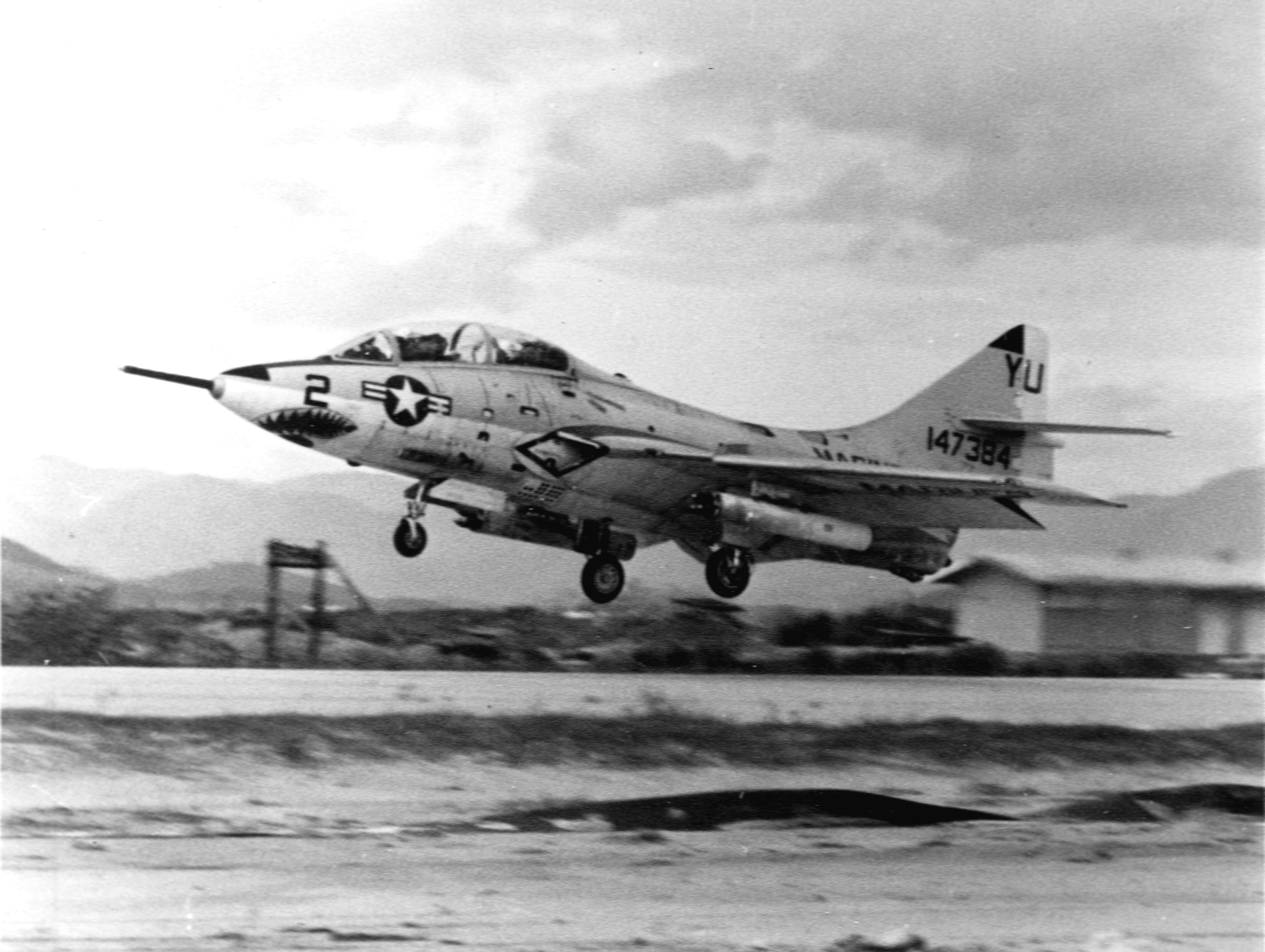
A TF-9J (F9F-8T) of H&MS-13 at Chu Lai, Vietnam 1967

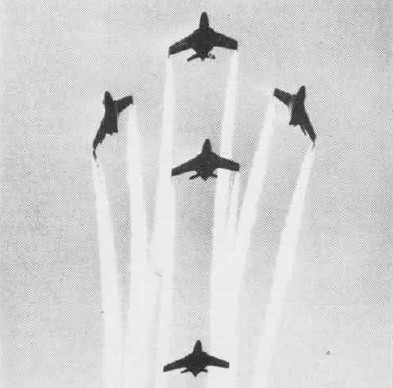
Blue Angel F9F-8's performing a "fleur-de-lis" maneuver in 1955

=== United States ===
The first F9F-6s were assigned to fleet squadron VF-32 at the end of 1952. The first F9F Cougar squadron to actually deploy was VF-24, assigned to USS Yorktown in August 1953. It arrived too late to the Korean theater to participate in the air war.

F9F-8s were withdrawn from front-line service in 1958–59, replaced by F11F Tigers and F8U Crusaders. The Naval Reserves used them until the mid-1960s, but none of the single-seat versions were used in the Vietnam War.

The only version of the Cougar to see combat was the TF-9J trainer (known as F9F-8T until 1962) during the Vietnam War. Detachments of four Cougars served with US Marines Headquarters and Maintenance Squadron 11 (H&MS-11) at Da Nang and H&MS-13 at Chu Lai, where they were used for fast-Forward Air Control and the airborne command role, directing airstrikes against enemy positions in South Vietnam between 1966 and 1968.

The TF-9J two-seat trainer had a long service with the U.S. Navy. It served as the Navy's advanced flight trainer for more than two decades. The proposed Cougar modification (re-engined with a J52 engine) was rejected, and the Navy selected the TA-4F Skyhawk. The last Cougar was phased out when Training Squadron 4 (VT-4) re-equipped in February 1974. A F9F-8T, BuNo 14276, is displayed at the National Naval Aviation Museum at NAS Pensacola, Florida.

==== Transcontinental speed record ====
The US Navy used the F9F Cougar to set the transcontinental crossing record on April 1, 1954. Three pilots from fleet fighter squadron VF-21 completed the 2,438-mile (3,924 km) flight in under four hours with LCDR F.X. Brady setting the quickest time of 3 hours, 45 minutes and 30 seconds. This was the first time the distance had been covered in under four hours. The three F9F-6 aircraft refueled over Kansas from a North American AJ Savage, using an experimental refueling probe mounted on the nose.

==== Blue Angels ====
The U.S. Navy's flight demonstration team, the Blue Angels flew four different variants of F9Fs from the F9F-2 Panther to the F9F-8. The Blue Angels replaced their six F9F-5 Panthers with six F9F-6s in 1953. This was short lived however and the Navy subsequently took them for fleet use without using the planes in an air show. The F9F-6s were then replaced with overhauled F9F-5s until 1954 when the Blue Angels switched to the F9F-8. The Blue Angels used the F9F-8 until 1957 they were replaced by the Grumman F11F-1 Tiger, although one two-seat F9F-8T was retained for press and VIP flights.

=== Argentina ===
The only foreign air arm to use the F9F Cougar was the Argentine Naval Aviation, who also used the F9F Panther as well. Two F9F-8T trainers were acquired in 1962, and served until 1971. The Cougar was the first jet to break the sound barrier in Argentina. One aircraft (serial 3-A-151) is on display at the Naval Aviation Museum (MUAN) at Bahía Blanca, while the other was sold to a customer in the United States and subsequently lost in an accident on 31 October 1991.

== Variants ==
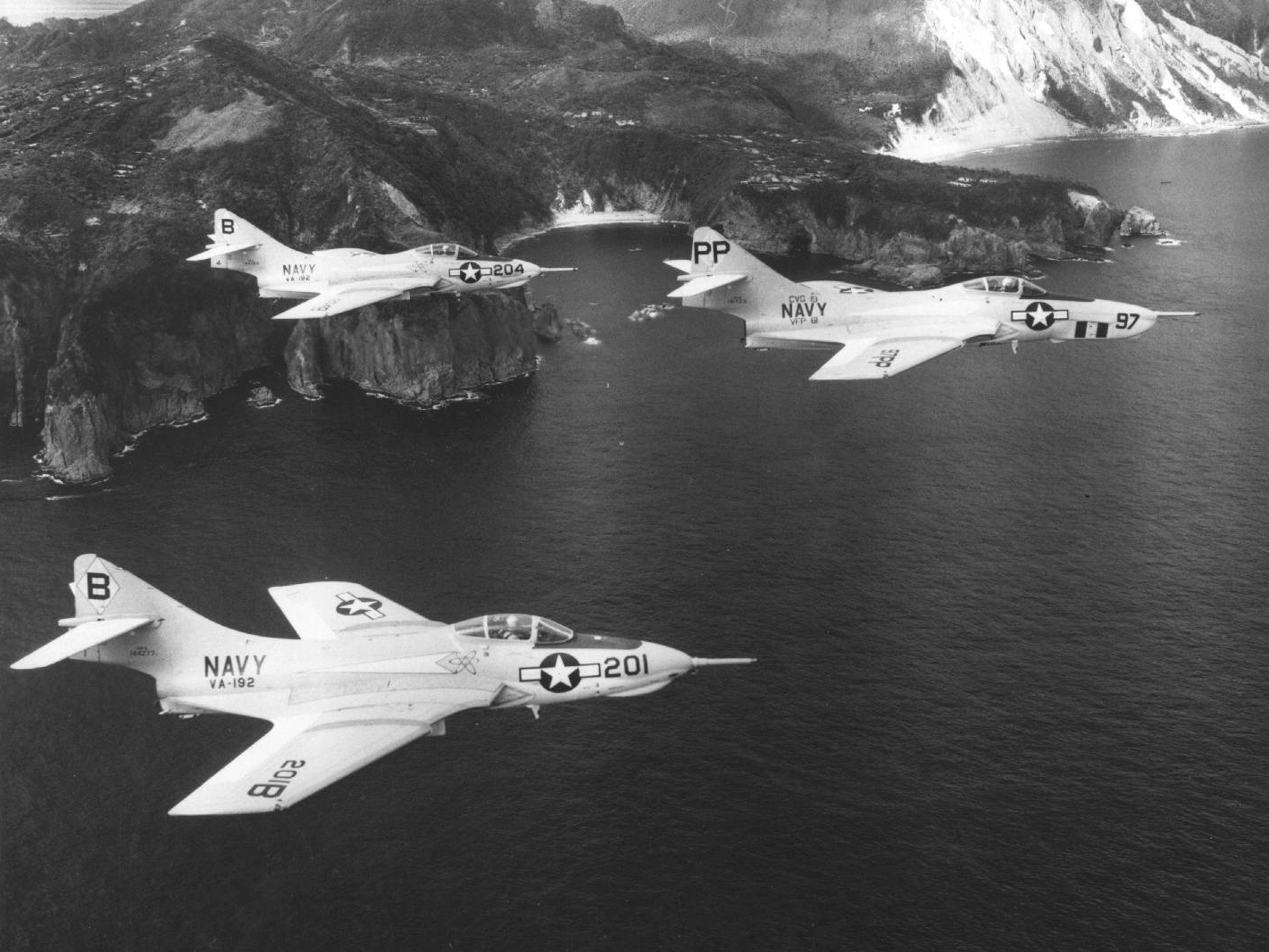
Two F9F-8Bs from VA-192 and an F9F-8P of VFP-61 over Formosa (Taiwan), in 1957

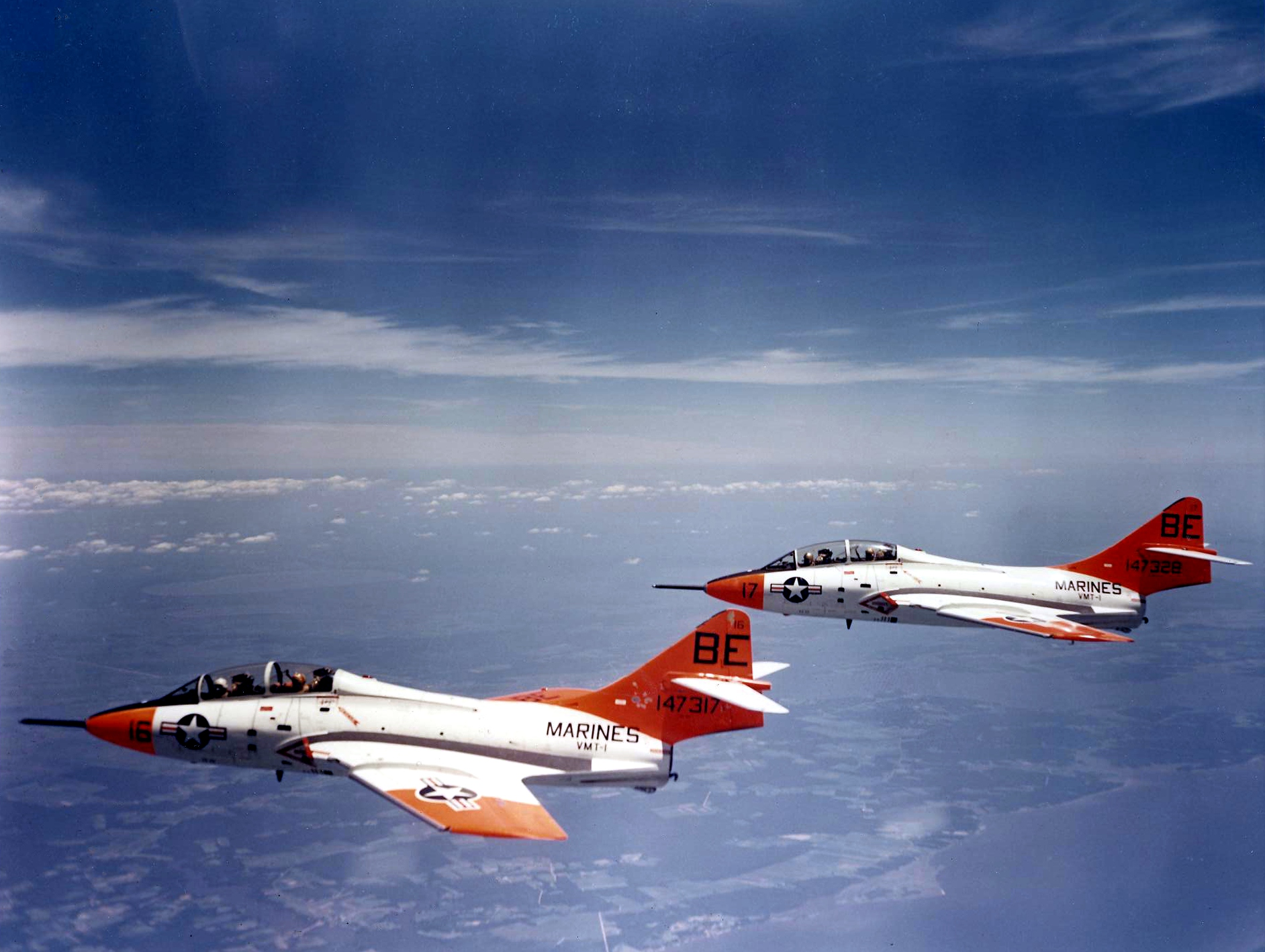
F9F-8Ts of VMT-1 near MCAS Cherry Point, 1962

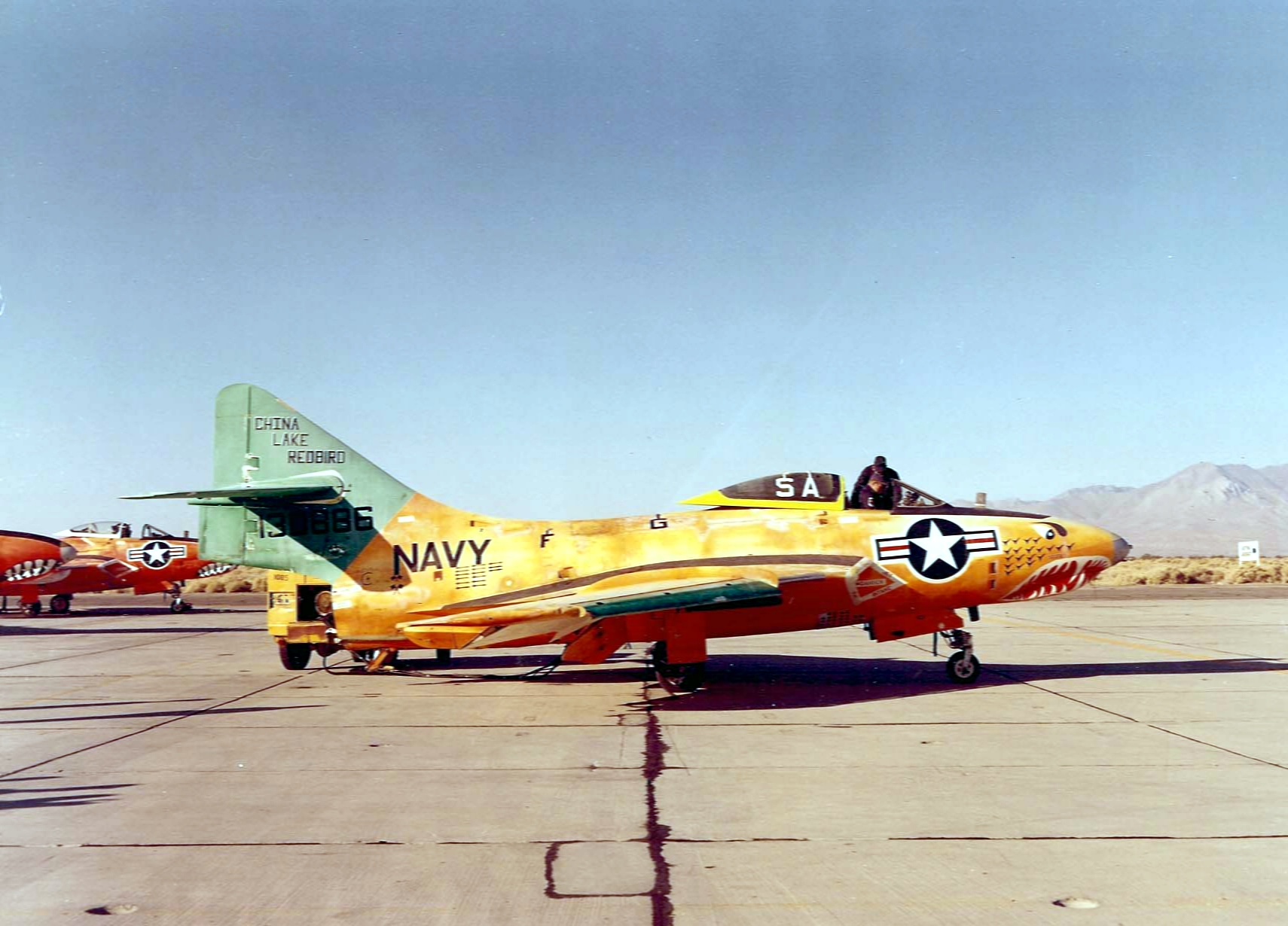
QF-9J target drone in 1970

XF9F-6
Prototypes built from the F9F-5 Panther, with swept wings and horizontal tail surfaces. Initially powered by 7,000 lbf (31 kN) J-48-P6 engine and later reengined with 7,250 lbf (32.2 kN) YJ-48-P8. Three prototypes built (two flying and one static test).
F9F-6
Initial production version; redesignated F-9F in 1962, 646 built.
F9F-6P
Photo-reconnaissance versions; redesignated RF-9F in 1962, 60 built.
F9F-6PD
Drone director aircraft, converted from F9F-6Ps; redesignated DF-9F in 1962.
F9F-6D
Drone director aircraft, converted from F9F-6s; redesignated DF-9F in 1962.
F9F-6K
Unmanned drone for combat training, converted from F9F-6s; redesignated QF-9F in 1962.
F9F-6K2
An improved version of the F9F-6K target drone; redesignated QF-9G in 1962.
F9F-7
Built with the Allison J33 engine; most were converted to take J48s; redesignated F-9H in 1962, 168 built.
F9F-8
Longer center fuselage, strengthened canopy, redesigned wing, increased fuel capacity, and the ability to carry AIM-9 Sidewinder missiles; redesignated F-9J in 1962, 601 built.
YF9F-8B
Prototype for a single-seat attack-fighter aircraft converted from a F9F-8; later redesignated YAF-9J.
F9F-8B
F9F-8s converted into single-seat attack-fighters; later redesignated AF-9J.
F9F-8P
Photo-reconnaissance versions built from F9F-8s; later redesignated RF-9J, 110 built.
YF9F-8T
One F9F-8 aircraft converted into a prototype for the F9F-8T training aircraft; later redesignated YTF-9J.
F9F-8T
Two-seat trainers built from F9F-8s; redesignated TF-9J in 1962, 399 built.
NTF-9J
Two TF-9Js used for special test duties.
YF9F-9
Original designation of the YF11F-1 Tiger prototypes. First flight was on 30 July 1954; redesignated in April 1955.

== Operators ==
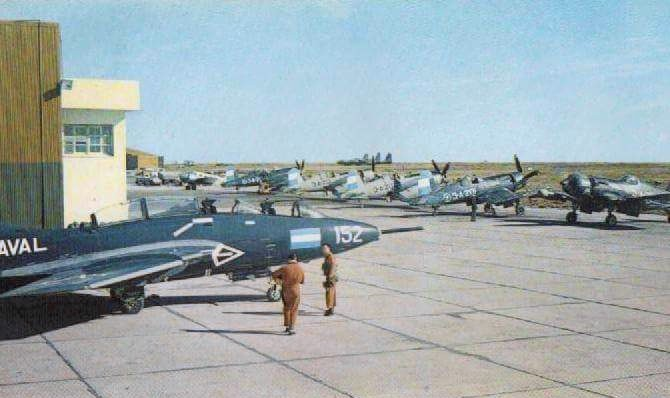
An F9F Cougar and various F4U Corsairs from the Argentine Navy

Argentina

- Argentine Navy – Argentine Naval Aviation

United States

- United States Navy
- United States Marine Corps

== Aircraft on display ==
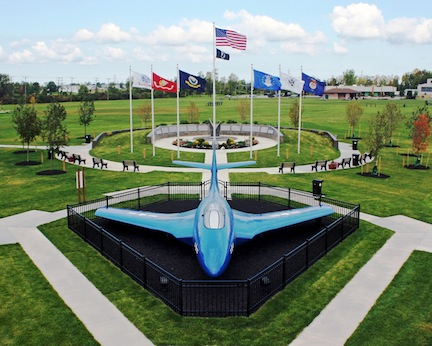
The "Blue Jet". An F9F-6P sits in front of the Town of Tonawanda Veterans Memorial.

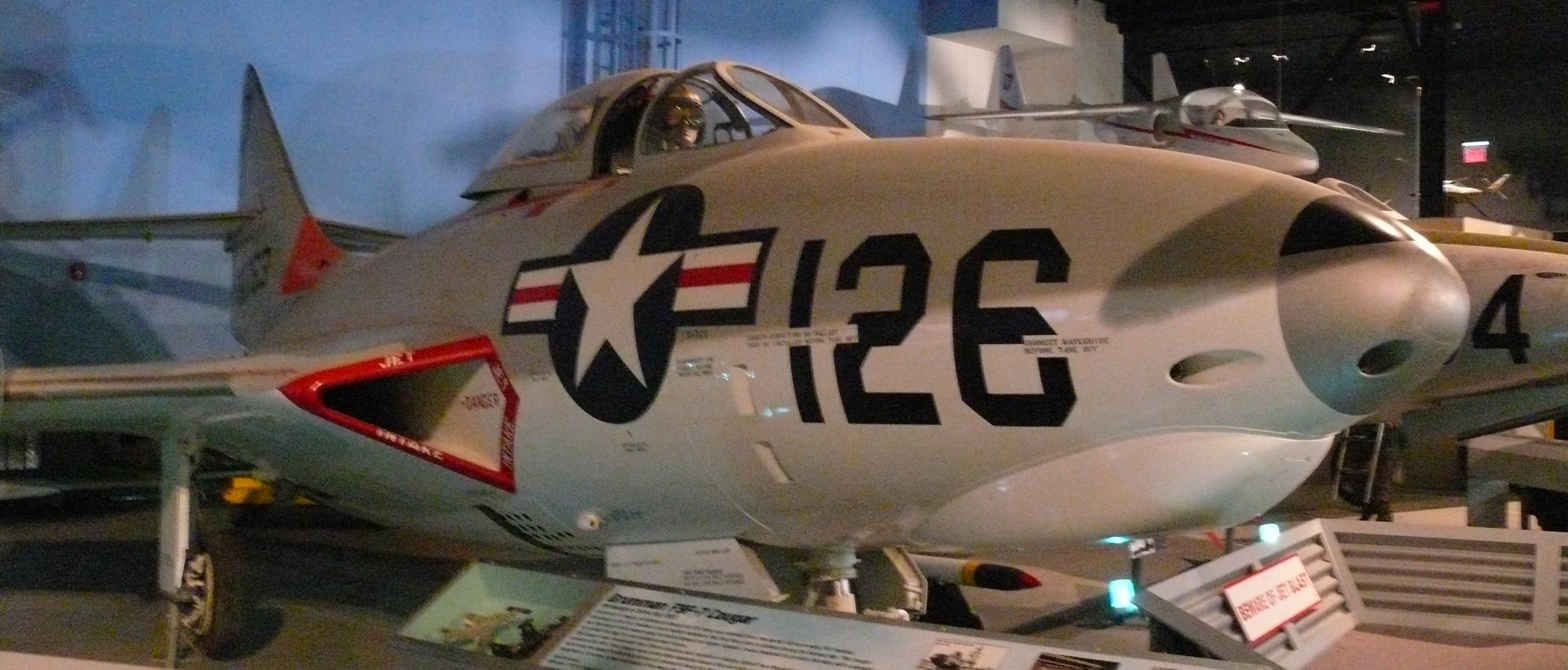
F9F-7 in the Cradle of Aviation Museum

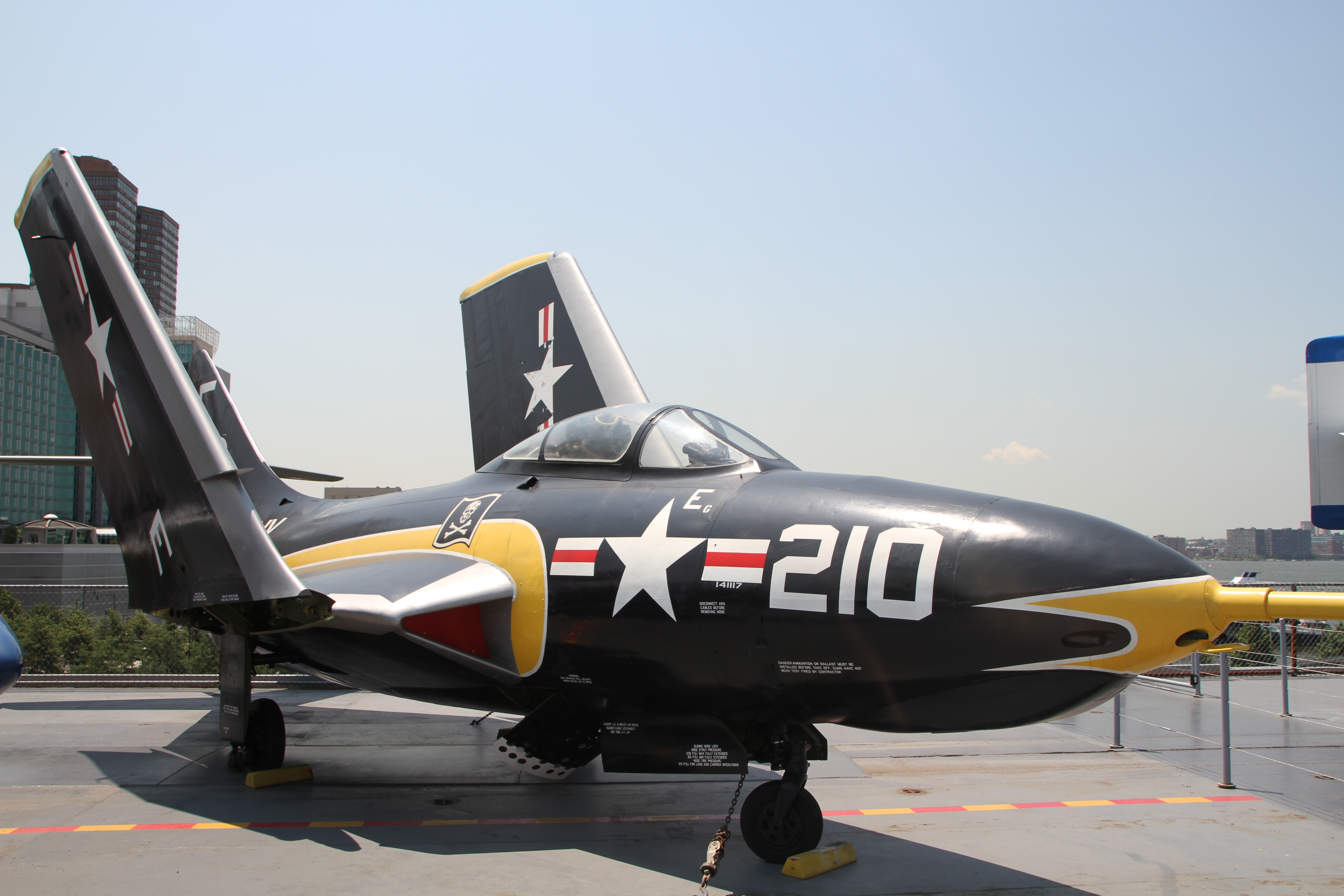
F9F-8 with wings folded aboard USS Intrepid, New York City

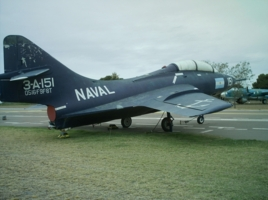
F9F-8T at the Argentine Naval Aviation Museum

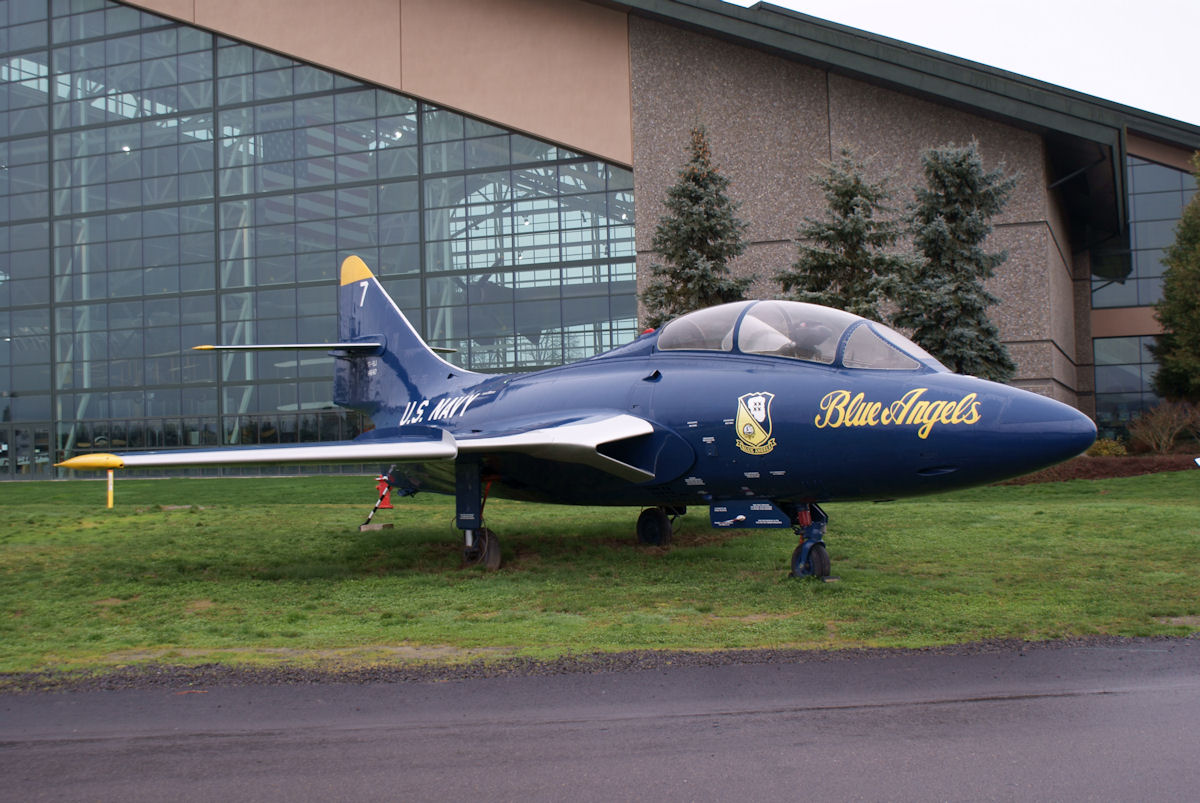
Blue Angels TF-9J at the Evergreen Aviation & Space Museum

=== Argentina ===
F9F-8T

- 0516/3-A-151 (Argentine Navy) – Argentine Naval Aviation Museum (Museo de la Aviacion Naval - MUAN) at Bahía Blanca, Argentina.

=== United States ===
F9F-6

- 126670 – in storage at the National Air and Space Museum, Paul E. Garber Preservation, Restoration, and Storage Facility, Suitland, Maryland.
- 128109 – National Naval Aviation Museum at NAS Pensacola, Florida.
- 127236 – New Iberia Veterans Memorial Building, New Iberia, Louisiana.

F9F-6P

- unknown – The Town of Tonawanda Veterans Memorial in the Town of Tonawanda, New York. The aircraft has been on display since 1959 and in 2009 was refurbished when the new Town of Tonawanda Veterans Memorial was created.
- 127484 – Former Marine Corps aircraft has been a ground display for children to play on in Boysen Park in Anaheim, California, since about 1960. For safety reasons, in 1967 the aircraft was coated in gunite to cover sharp edges that had developed.

F9F-7

- 130763 – Cradle of Aviation Museum in Garden City, New York.

F9F-8

- 131063 – Texas Air Museum in Slaton, Texas.
- 131230 – National Naval Aviation Museum, NAS Pensacola, Florida.
- 131232 – Museum of Flight in Seattle, Washington.
- 138876 – Pueblo Weisbrod Aircraft Museum in Pueblo, Colorado.
- 141117 – Intrepid Sea-Air-Space Museum in New York, New York. It is on loan from the National Museum of Naval Aviation. It was built in Grumman's Bethpage factory in 1955 and retired from active service in 1965. It previously served as a gate guard for Naval Weapons Station Earle, and later was displayed at a playground in Wall Township, NJ. Restored to wear the colors of fighter squadron VF-61, which flew from USS Intrepid in 1956.
- 141121 – Pima Air & Space Museum, adjacent to Davis-Monthan AFB, in Tucson, Arizona.
- 146417 – Evergreen Aviation & Space Museum in McMinnville, Oregon. It is on loan from the National Museum of Naval Aviation and is painted to represent the narrator's aircraft for the U.S. Navy Blue Angels precision flight demonstration team.

F9F-8B

- 144275 – Patuxent River Naval Air Museum in Lexington Park, Maryland.

F9F-8P

- 141675 – Yanks Air Museum in Chino, California.
- 141702 – USS Midway Museum in San Diego, California.
- 141722 – Flying Leatherneck Aviation Museum, MCAS Miramar in San Diego, California.
- 144388 – Estrella Warbird Museum in Paso Robles, California.
- 144426 – Pima Air & Space Museum, adjacent to Davis-Monthan AFB in Tucson, Arizona.
- 144402 – Military Aviation Preservation Society, M.A.P.S. in Canton, Ohio.
- 144406 – Privately owned by Mike Kellner, in Marengo, Illinois.

F9F-8T

- 142442 – The Town of Woodridge, New York.
- 147276 – USS Lexington Museum in Corpus Christi, Texas.
- 147283 – Air Zoo in Kalamazoo, Michigan.
- 147385 – USS Yorktown (CV-10) at the Patriot's Point Naval and Maritime Museum in Mount Pleasant, South Carolina.
- 147397 – Pima Air & Space Museum, adjacent to Davis-Monthan AFB in Tucson, Arizona.
- 142985 – Hickory Aviation Museum, Hickory Regional Airport (KHKY) in Hickory, North Carolina.
- 147418 – James Clemens High School part of the Madison City Schools district in Madison, Alabama.

== Specifications (F9F-6/F-9F) ==
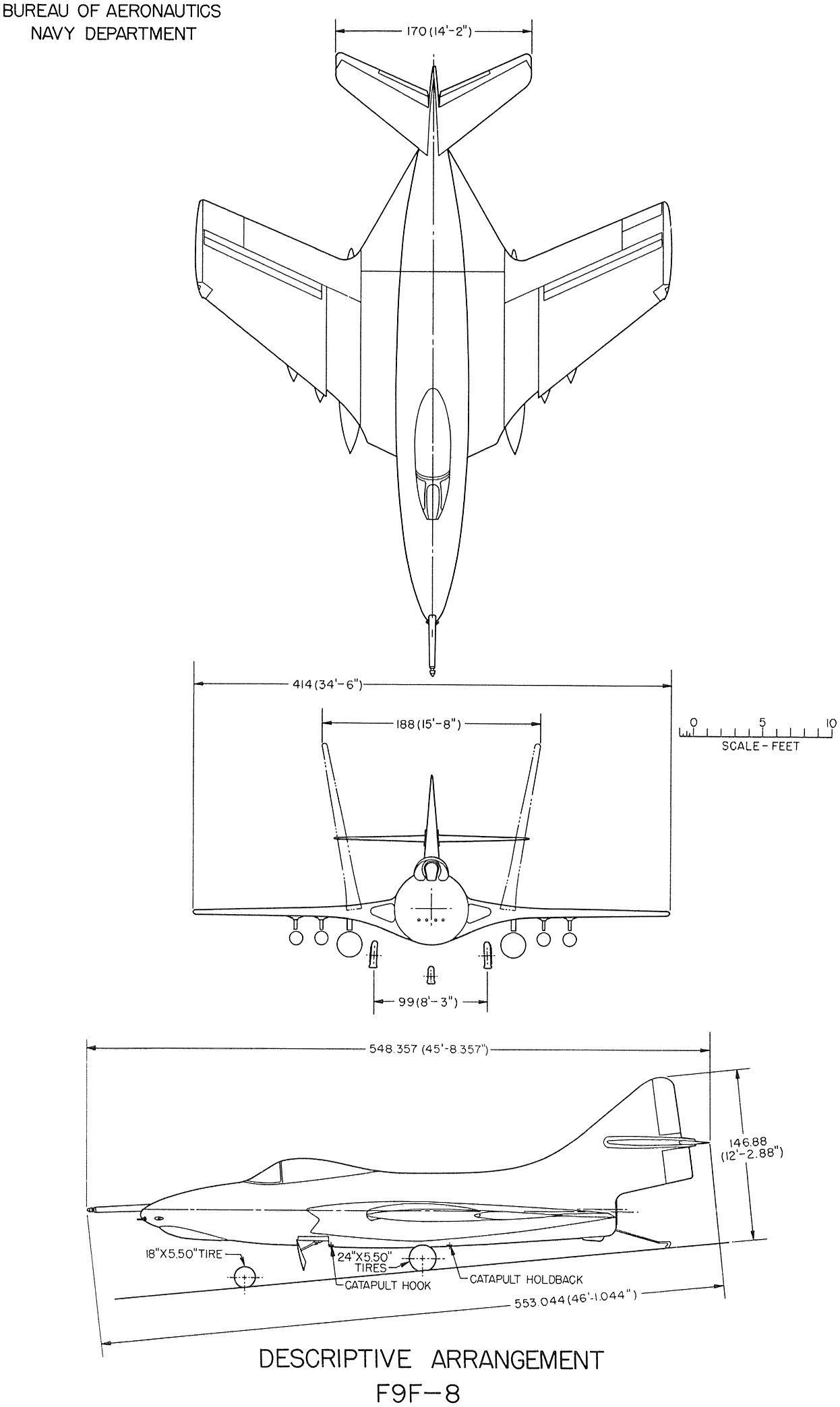
3-view line drawing of the Grumman F9F-8 Cougar

Data from NAVAIR : Standard Aircraft Characteristics F9F-6 "Cougar" 1 July 1953, Navair: Standard Aircraft Characteristics F9F-6 "Cougar" 1 July 1967

General characteristics

- Crew: 1
- Length: 40 ft 11 in (12.47 m)
- Wingspan: 34 ft 6 in (10.52 m)
- Width: 14 ft 2 in (4.32 m) folded (tailplane span)
- Height: 12 ft 3.5 in (3.747 m)
- Height folded: 15 ft 10 in (4.8 m) (wing-tips)
- Wing area: 300 sq ft (28 m^{2})
- Aspect ratio: 4
- Airfoil: NACA 64A010
- Empty weight: 11,483 lb (5,209 kg)
- Empty equipped: 12,090 lb (5,484 kg)
- Gross weight: 15,800 lb (7,167 kg)
- Combat weight: 16,244 lb (7,368 kg)
- Max takeoff weight: 21,000 lb (9,525 kg) on land

20,000 lb (9,072 kg) from catapult

- Maximum landing weight: 16,000 lb (7,257 kg) on land

14,000 lb (6,350 kg) arrested landing

- Fuel capacity: 763 US gal (635 imp gal; 2,890 L) in two fuselage tanks and 156 US gal (130 imp gal; 590 L) in four wing leading edge tanks; total 919 US gal (765 imp gal; 3,480 L)
- Powerplant: 1 × Pratt & Whitney J48-P-8 centrifugal-flow turbojet engine, 7,250 lbf (32.2 kN) thrust at 11,000 rpm for take-off / Military power at sea level

5,600 lbf (24.91 kN) at 10,450 rpm maximum continuous at sea level

Performance

- Maximum speed: 654 mph (1,053 km/h, 568 kn) at sea level at 18,450 lb (8,369 kg) TOW
- Cruise speed: 541 mph (871 km/h, 470 kn) at 41,200–45,000 ft (12,600–13,700 m)
- Stall speed: 128 mph (206 km/h, 111 kn) at 18,450 lb (8,369 kg) TOW power off

107 mph (93 kn; 172 km/h) at 15,157 lb (6,875 kg) with approach power

- Combat range: 293 mi (472 km, 255 nmi) with one hour and 24 minutes of mission time
- Service ceiling: 44,500 ft (13,600 m)
- g limits: +7.5 at 15,800 lb (7,167 kg); +5.5 at MTOW
- Rate of climb: 6,750 ft/min (34.3 m/s) at sea level at 18,450 lb (8,369 kg) TOW
- Time to altitude:

- 20,000 ft (6,100 m) in four minutes at 18,450 lb (8,369 kg) TOW
- 30,000 ft (9,100 m) in six minutes and 48 seconds at 18,450 lb (8,369 kg) TOW

- Wing loading: 61.5 lb/sq ft (300 kg/m^{2}) at 18,450 lb (8,369 kg) TOW
- Take-off run: 2,100 ft (640 m) at 18,450 lb (8,369 kg) TOW in nil wind

1,360 ft (415 m) at 18,450 lb (8,369 kg) TOW in 29 mph (25 kn; 47 km/h) wind

Armament

- Guns: 4 × 20 mm (0.79 in) AN/M3 cannon, 190 rounds per gun
- Rockets: 6 × 5 in (127 mm) rockets
- Bombs: 2 × 1,000 lb (454 kg) bombs on inboard pylons plus 2 x 500 lb (227 kg) bombs on outer pylons

Avionics

- Fire-control radar - AN/APG-30

== See also ==
Related development

- Grumman F9F Panther – US Navy carrier-based jet fighter
- Grumman F-11 Tiger – US Navy carrier-based fighter aircraft in service 1956–1969

Aircraft of comparable role, configuration, and era

- Dassault Ouragan – French fighter-bomber aircraft family
- Douglas F4D Skyray – US carrier-based jet-powered interceptor
- Hawker Sea Hawk – 1947 fighter aircraft family by Hawker
- McDonnell F3H Demon – US Navy fighter aircraft
- Mikoyan-Gurevich MiG-17 – Soviet jet fighter aircraft family

Related lists

- List of fighter aircraft
- List of military aircraft of the United States
