= Holy Angels Church =

Holy Angels Church may refer to:

- Holy Angels Church (Globe, Arizona), listed on the U.S. National Register of Historic Places (NRHP)
- Cathedral of the Holy Angels (Gary, Indiana)
- Holy Angels Church (Buffalo, New York)
- Holy Angels Catholic Church (Sandusky, Ohio), NRHP-listed
