= Niagara Frontier League =

The Niagara Frontier League (NFL) is a high school athletic league in Western New York. It was formed in the spring of 1937 at a meeting in Mike Cutt's Clay Pipe Inn in Tonawanda, New York. Representatives from Lackawanna, Tonawanda, North Tonawanda, Niagara Falls, Trott, Kenmore and Lockport merged the former RPI basketball and St. Lawrence football leagues to found the NFL.

In the early years of the NFL, schedules were balanced by granting associate memberships for either football or basketball to Batavia, Dunkirk, Jamestown, and Olean. The league stabilized its membership in 1939 with the addition of La Salle and the expansion to other sports.

In 1959, Kenmore East entered competition and in 1961, the late Harry Blakeslee brought Lewiston-Porter into the fold from the Niagara Orleans League.

1965 saw the withdrawal of charter member Lackawanna to the E.C.I.C. Niagara Wheatfield entered the league at that time, coming from the Niagara Orleans League. The NFL initiated an extensive sports program for the girls in the member schools in 1973 and it has flourished since.

Grand Island left the E.C.I.C. and moved to the NFL in 1979 and the league welcomed the Nichols School in 1983.

Each member school felt the loss of charter member Trott Vocational due to the school closing in 1988. The Engineers, with more than 50 years of competition in the NFL had been a source of pride for the school, the city of Niagara Falls, the league and their alumni.

In 1995, charter member Tonawanda High School left for the E.C.I.C. The opening of the new Niagara Falls High School in the fall of 2000 spelled the end of LaSalle High School. LaSalle High School, who entered the Niagara Frontier League in 1939, was consolidated into the new high school.

The Nichols School withdrew from the league at the close of the 2002 school year.

The NFL welcomed the Charter School for Applied Technologies in 2004. The Charter School for Applied Technologies left the Niagara Frontier League at the conclusion of the 2006–07 season. They have since rejoined the league as a full member.

== Current members ==
- Grand Island Senior High School
- Kenmore East High School
- Kenmore West High School
- Lewiston-Porter High School
- Lockport Senior High School
- Niagara Falls High School
- Niagara Wheatfield Senior High School
- North Tonawanda
- Charter School for Applied Technologies

== Past members ==
- Charter School for Applied Technologies
- Lackawanna High School
- La Salle High School (Niagara Falls, New York)
- Nichols High School
- Tonawanda High School
- Trott Vocational School
