= Lewiston-Porter Central School District =

School district in New York, United States

- Lewiston-Porter District "LP" logo

Address
- 4061 Creek Road Youngstown, New York, 14174; United States
- Coordinates: 43.216°N 79.017°W

District information
- Type: Public
- Motto: Aiming Higher
- Grades: K-12
- Established: 1947; 79 years ago
- Superintendent: Paul J. Casseri
- NCES District ID: 3617190

Students and staff
- Enrollment: 1,976 (2019-2020)
- Faculty: under 175
- District mascot: Lancer
- Colors: Kelly green & white

Other information
- Website: www.lew-port.com

Lewiston-Porter Central School District, colloquially referred to as "Lew-Port", is a school district in the towns of Lewiston and Porter, New York, about fifteen miles (24 km) from the city of Niagara Falls.

== District ==
Lewiston-Porter educates students from Youngstown, Lewiston, and Ransomville, New York. The district encompasses approximately 54 square miles (140 km^{2}) in northern Niagara County, on the shores of Lake Ontario and bordering on the Niagara River. Centralized in 1947, the district is contained in the towns of Lewiston and Porter. About 70% of the district's taxable property falls within the Town of Lewiston, while the Town of Porter makes up approximately 30% of the assessed value of the district. The district contains five main structures:

- District Offices
- Primary building (grades K-2)
- Intermediate building (grades 3-5)
- Middle School (grades 6-8)
- High School (grades 9-12)

As of June 2015, Lewiston-Porter enrolled 2,077 students in K-12 with 12 pupils per teacher. The district had expenditures of $42,234,808 and spending per pupil of $19,241. The superintendent of Lewiston-Porter is Paul J. Casseri

As of 2015, Lewiston-Porter students were:

- Female students: 48.21%
- Male students: 51.79%
- White students: 92.93%
- Black students: 1.77%
- Hispanic students: 2.20%
- Asian students: 1.48%
- Native American students: 0.81%
- Multiracial students: 0.81%
- Gini-Simpson diversity index: 13.53%
- Living with both parents: 74.76%
- Economically disadvantaged: 17.25%
- Youth poverty rate: 7.69%

In 2014 Lewiston-Porter Central School District was the highest ranked school district (including both public and private high schools) in Niagara Country, and ninth overall in Western New York, in terms of overall academic performance. In 2015, Lewiston-Porter was rated tenth best in Western New York and second in Niagara County, behind Starpoint Central School District.

=== History ===
==== Selected Former Superintendents ====
- Tobias J. Collins–1950-?
- Jerry J. Herman–?-1972
- E.K. Stevens [interim]–1972 (Assistant Superintendent - Lewiston-Porter Central School District, returned to position)
- Daniel Healey
- Gail M. Stephens–1985-1988 (Superintendent - Whitmore Lake Public Schools, fired)
- Walter S. Polka–1990-2003 (Assistant Superintendent for Instruction - Lewiston-Porter Central School District, retired)
- Whitney K. Vantine–2003-2005 (Superintendent - Union Springs Central School District, named Superintendent of Cold Spring Harbor School District)
- Donald W. Rappold [interim]–2005-2008 (Assistant Superinendent - Lewiston-Porter Central School District, returned to position)
- R. Christopher Roser–2008-2015 (Superintendent - Avoca Central School District, retired)

== Schools ==
=== High school ===
Lewiston-Porter High School

Information
- Principal: Christopher D'Anna
- Grades: 9-12
- Website: Lewiston-Porter High School

Lewiston-Porter High School serves grades 9–12. The current principal is Christopher D'Anna. The high school has a large gymnasium, a pool on the second floor, a large auditorium, and 3 floors of classrooms. Several sections of the high school underwent extensive renovation and remodeling, concluding in 2016.

Over 40 percent of the students participate in interscholastic sports. There are over 30 extracurricular opportunities for students to explore many different interests. Lew-Port High School has a China exchange program where students go to live with a volunteered family, and teachers and students of China live in Lewiston for a 6-month period of time. Lew-Port has formed relationships with sister high schools in Italy, Argentina, France, China, Belgium, and England. 98.4% of Lewiston Porter High School students complete high school, and 84% of the students will further their education in a college setting.

==== History ====
Lewiston-Porter High School opened in 1971 and was dedicated on October 3, 1971.

===== Former Principals =====
- Harry K. Blakeslee–1947-1960 (Principal - Lewiston High School, named Director of Health/Physical Education for Lewiston-Porter Central School District and founder of the Lewiston Porter School District)
- Paul W. Haley–1960-1967 (Biology teacher - Lewiston Porter High School, unknown)
- James W. Davis–1967-1971 (unknown, named Assistant Principal for Instruction at Lewiston-Porter Central School District)
- Theodore Wodzinski–1971-1974
- Glenn Leis–1974-1980 (Principal - Newton High School, killed)
- William H. Hockaday–1980-1986 (Deceased 2011, funeral announcement by family)
- Richard A. Maratto–1986-1990 (Principal – Kensington High School, named Principal of Iroquois High School)
- Roberta J. Love–1990-2002 (Assistant Principal – Williamsville North High School, retired)
- Michael J. Gallagher–2002-2005 (Principal – North Collins Junior/Senior High School, named Principal of Hamburg High School)
- Paul Casseri–2005-2015 (Principal – South Park High School, named Superintendent of Lewiston-Porter Central School District)
- Andrew Auer–2015-2017 (Principal - Lewiston-Porter Intermediate Center, named Principal of Lewiston-Porter Middle School)
- Jared D. Taft–2017-2019 (Vice Principal - Lackawanna High School, named Principal of Alexander Elementary School)
- Whitney Vantine [interim]–2019-2020 (Interim Superintendent - West Seneca Central School District, retired)

=== Academics ===
Lew-Port High School is accredited by the Middle States Association Commission on Secondary Schools.

=== Middle school ===
Lewiston-Porter Middle School

Information
- Principal: Andrew M. Auer
- Grades: 6-8
- Website: Lewiston-Porter MS

Lewiston-Porter Middle School houses grades 6–8. The current principal is Andrew Auer.

The middle school contains a gymnasium with a retractable batting cage, a cafeteria/auditorium, and one floor of classrooms.

==== History ====
Lewiston Porter Middle School was built and opened in 1957 as "Lewiston-Porter Junior High School."

=== Intermediate Education Center ===
Lewiston-Porter Intermediate Education Center

Information
- Principal: Tina Rodriguez
- Grades: 3-5
- Website: Lewiston-Porter Intermediate Education Center

Lewiston-Porter Intermediate Education Center (formerly South Elementary School) serves grades 3–5. The principal is Tina Rodriguez.

The "IEC" as it is called by students and teachers, has a large gymnasium that can be divided, a large cafeteria once referred to as the “Lancer Inn”, two floors of classrooms and a one-story wing with music and art rooms facing east.

==== History ====
The "IEC" was originally built and opened as Lewiston-Porter Central Junior-Senior High School on September 3, 1952. The school's named changed from South Elementary to Lewiston-Porter Intermediate Center in 2002.

=== Primary Education Center ===
Lewiston-Porter Primary Education Center

Information
- Principal: Tamara Larson
- Grades: K-2
- Website: Lewiston-Porter Central School Primary Education Center

Lewiston-Porter Primary Education Center (formerly North Elementary School) houses grades K-2 and has an enrollment of 513 students. The Multi-Age Program hosts children from grades 1 - 3. The principal is Tamara Larson.

=== History ===
National Blue Ribbon Award

In 2015, the Lewiston-Porter Primary Education Center was one of nineteen schools throughout New York State to be nominated by the New York State Education Department as a National Blue Ribbon School. The nineteen nominees were selected out of 6,500 schools throughout New York State and include elementary, middle, and high school levels as well as public, private, and charter schools.

=== Special education ===
The Lewiston-Porter Central School District provides students with disabilities the appropriate services to meet each student's educational needs. A student is classified through the district's (CSE) Committee on Special Education Department or (CPSE) Committee on Preschool Education. The office is located in the Administration Building.

== Sports ==
The name of the schools sports team is the "Lewiston-Porter Lancers". The logo consists of a medieval lancer standing ready to charge, covered in kelly green and white, which are the school district's colors. Lewiston-Porter has an array of sports programs, including baseball, football, basketball, bowling, wrestling, cheerleading, track and field, cross country, tennis, volleyball, gymnastics, swimming, golf, soccer, hockey, lacrosse, and softball. Lew-Port has a turf field behind its high school which can hold football, soccer, and lacrosse games and practices for the school. Brad Halgash is the athletic director.

Lew-Port competes in the Niagara Frontier League (NFL) with rival schools including Niagara-Wheatfield, Niagara Falls, Lockport, Starpoint Central School District, and the Grand Island Central School District. Currently, Lew-Port is in New York's Section 6.

In Lew-Port history, only three Jersey numbers have been officially retired. They include:

- Number 34 – NFL player and Lew-Port alumnus Daryl Johnston's number was retired from the school's football program on September 1, 2006.
- Number 74 – football player Kenny Mort's number was also retired in Lewiston Porter's football program.
- Number 76 – football player Johnathan "J-Mill" Miller's number was retired from the football program on October 1, 2010. Additionally, a patch with his number was placed on the varsity sports teams' jerseys. Miller died on November 15, 2009, in a car accident.

== Stadiums ==
Lew-Port has two stadiums behind their high school. Blakeslee Field, most commonly used for football, can also be used for soccer and lacrosse. It is a synthetic artificial grass turf field. Next to Blakeslee Field is Elia Stadium, which is a full size soccer field. Both stadiums have four large sections of bleachers. In the Lew-Port High School, there is a full size gymnasium in which they hold boys and girls Varsity and Junior Varsity basketball, and wrestling matches. There is also a pool which can hold swim meets. Behind the middle school there are two baseball diamonds and two softball diamonds for J.V. and Varsity baseball and softball.

== Transportation ==
The school district offers transportation to/from students home to school in the form of school buses, operated by Ridge Road Express. Students are permitted to be driven to school by their parents. Additionally, eleventh and twelfth grade students may drive to school if they have a New York State license and permission by the school.

== Notable alumni ==
- Gary Baker, singer and songwriter
- Kyle Cerminara, freestyle wrestler and mixed martial artist
- Dave Clawson, former head football coach, Wake Forest University
- Sid Jamieson, lacrosse coach
- Daryl Johnston, former NFL fullback (Dallas Cowboys), Fox NFL broadcaster
- Jim Johnstone, former American basketball player
- Gary Schiff, politician and activist
