= Grand Island Senior High School (New York) =

Coordinates: 43°02′13″N 78°56′00″W

Location
- 1100 Ransom Rd; Grand Island, New York 14072; USA

Information
- Type: Public
- Motto: Knowledge, Understanding, Truth
- Principal: Hillary Kretz-Harvey
- Teaching staff: 79.05 (FTE)
- Enrollment: 883 (2023-2024)
- Student to teacher ratio: 11.17
- Mascot: Viking
- Colors
- Website: Grand Island High School

Grand Island Senior High School is a public high school located at 1100 Ransom Road in Grand Island, New York, serving over 800 students in grades 9–12. The school follows the New York State Regents Board curriculum. Advanced Placement classes are offered in 16 subjects, including Biology, Calculus, Physics C: Mechanics and Electricity/Magnetism, and US History. Many students participate in a BOCES program, which allows them to experience many occupations before pursuing them and gain useful training and certifications. Students' averages are calculated using a percentage based scale.

The school is under the jurisdiction of the Grand Island Central School District.

== History ==
The current high school building on Ransom Road was constructed in 1963, replacing earlier facilities that had housed the district's secondary students. Its cornerstone was laid in June 1963, and the building opened to students that September.

Between 2013 and 2017, the Grand Island Central School District carried out a $58 million capital improvement project affecting all of its buildings. Work at the high school included new academic wings, upgraded lighting and air conditioning, auditorium and gymnasium improvements, and expanded wireless network coverage.

=== Principals ===
Principals of Grand Island Senior High School
Name	Term	Notes
Clyde O. Eidens	1963–1967	Left to become assistant superintendent of the Scotia-Glenville Central School District
Howard K. Fuller	1967–1976	Previously supervising principal, Wilson Central School District
James E. Walline	1976–1993	Later principal of Cardinal O'Hara High School
S. Augustus Young (interim)	1993–1994	
John E. Essler II	1994–1996	Previously principal, Lockport High School
Gerald F. Hale (interim)	1996	
James H. Dempsey	1996–2006	Previously assistant principal, Kenmore West High School
Sandra K. Anzalone	2006–2013	Later superintendent, Eden Central School District
James H. Dempsey (interim)	2013	Returned from retirement; previously director of academics, Sacred Heart Academy
Daniel J. Quartley	2014–2016	Later principal, Bolivar-Richburg Middle/High School
Michael Lauria	2016–2024	
Hillary Kretz-Harvey	2024–present	

== Academics ==
In 2009, Grand Island Senior High School was ranked 2 out of 131 Western New York high schools in terms of academics. The school is the only high school in the Grand Island Central School District. Its Advanced Placement participation rate is 44 percent. Minority enrollment is 14 percent, and 29 percent of students are classified as economically disadvantaged.

== Athletics ==
Grand Island's athletic teams are known as the Vikings and compete in the Niagara Frontier League within Section VI of the New York State Public High School Athletic Association. The school fields teams in sports including football, basketball, soccer, baseball, softball, swimming, track and field, lacrosse, ice hockey, wrestling, and volleyball.

In 2026, the boys' basketball team won the Section VI Class A1 championship, its first sectional title since 1993, after finishing as Niagara Frontier League regular-season champion. The boys' soccer team won the Niagara Frontier League championship in 2020, having previously won three consecutive league titles through 2017.

== Music ==
In 2012, the Grand Island Central School District was named one of the Best Communities for Music Education in the United States by the NAMM Foundation, one of 176 districts recognized nationally that year. The district received the designation again in subsequent years through 2016.

== Notable alumni ==
- Jimmy Arias, professional tennis player and broadcaster
- Dale Brown (1974), novelist
- Stacy Clark (1998), singer-songwriter
- Carlin Hartman (1990), college basketball coach
- William Houston, politician
- Brett Kern (2004), NFL punter
