= Dick Offenhamer =

American sportsman (1913–1998)

Biographical details
- Born: June 30, 1913; Buffalo, New York, U.S.
- Died: August 7, 1998 (aged 85); Amherst, New York, U.S.

Playing career

Football
- 1933–1935: Colgate

Baseball
- 1934–1936: Colgate
- 1939: Harwich Mariners
- Positions: Halfback (football); Catcher, outfielder (baseball)

Coaching career (HC unless noted)

Football
- 1936–1945: Kenmore HS (NY)
- 1946–1954: Colgate (freshmen)
- 1955–1965: Buffalo

Head coaching record
- Overall: 58–37–5 (college); 50–7 (high school)

Accomplishments and honors

Championships
- 1 Lambert Cup (1958); 3 Niagara Frontier League (1943–1945)

Richard William Offenhamer (June 30, 1913 – August 7, 1998) was an American football and baseball player and football coach. He served as the head football coach at the University of Buffalo—now known as the University at Buffalo, from 1955 to 1965, compiling a record of 58–37–5. Offenhamer played college football and college baseball at Colgate University.

== Playing career ==
A native of Buffalo, New York, Offenhamer starred in football as a halfback and in baseball as a catcher at Bennett High School and at Colgate University in Hamilton, New York. At Colgate, he started at right halfback on the 1934 football team, which lost only to Ohio State, and again on the successful 1935 team. For the Colgate baseball team, Offenhamer hit .380 as a senior, playing as both a catcher and an outfielder. He was also intramural light heavyweight boxing champion all four years.

== Coaching career ==
=== Kenmore High School ===
After graduating from Colgate in 1936, he was an English teacher and the head football coach at Kenmore High School in Buffalo, New York. In 1939, he played summer baseball in the Cape Cod Baseball League, playing catcher for the league's Harwich Mariners. From 1936 through 1946, his Kenmore teams compiling an outstanding record of 50–7 capturing Niagara Frontier League championships in 1943, 1944 and 1945.

=== Colgate ===
From 1946 until 1955, he was the head coach of the freshmen football team at Colgate.

=== University of Buffalo ===
In 1955, Offenhamer was recruited by University of Buffalo President Dr. Clifford C. Furnas to revive the school's football team. Offenhamer went on to serve as the head football coach at Buffalo from 1955 to 1965, compiling a record of 58–37–5. His 1958 team won the Lambert Cup as the top-rated small school in the East. Offenhamer was named by United Press International as Coach of the Week after the Bulls upset highly regarded Columbia University 34-14 on October 25, 1958. Offenhamer’s program at U.B. produced several individuals who went on to distinguished professional careers, including Gerry Philbin, a member of the 1968 Super Bowl champion New York Jets, and Buddy Ryan who was on Offenhamer's staff as the defensive line coach.

== Honors and death ==
In 1984, Offenhamer was inducted in the University of Buffalo Athletics Hall of Fame, and in 1985, he was inducted in the Colgate Athletics Hall of Fame for baseball. In 1998, he was inducted into the Greater Buffalo Sports Hall of Fame. Offenhamer died at age 85, on August 7, 1998, at Millard Suburban Hospital in Amherst, New York.

== Head coaching record ==
Year	Team	Overall	Conference	Standing	Bowl/playoffs
Buffalo Bulls (Independent) (1955–1961)
1955	Buffalo	4–4–1			
1956	Buffalo	5–3			
1957	Buffalo	5–4			
1958	Buffalo	8–1			
1959	Buffalo	8–1			
1960	Buffalo	4–6			
1961	Buffalo	4–5			
Buffalo Bulls (NCAA University Division independent) (1962–1965)
1962	Buffalo	6–3			
1963	Buffalo	5–3–1			
1964	Buffalo	4–4–1			
1965	Buffalo	5–3–2			
Buffalo:		58–37–5			
Total:		58–37–5			
