= Herbert Hoover Middle School =

Herbert Hoover Middle School can refer to:

- Herbert Hoover Middle School, Long Beach Unified School District
- Herbert Hoover Middle School (San Francisco), California
- Herbert Hoover Middle School (San Jose, California)
- Herbert Hoover Middle School (Potomac, Maryland)
- Herbert Hoover Middle School, Edison Township Public Schools, New Jersey
- Herbert Hoover Middle School, Kenmore-Town of Tonawanda School District, New York
