= KEHS =

KEHS may refer to:

- KEHS Malaysia Sdn. Bhd.
- Kennewick High School
- King Edward VI High School for Girls, Birmingham
- King Edward VI High School, Stafford
- Kenmore East High School
