= Eberhardt Mansion =

Historic house in New York, United States

- U.S. National Register of Historic Places
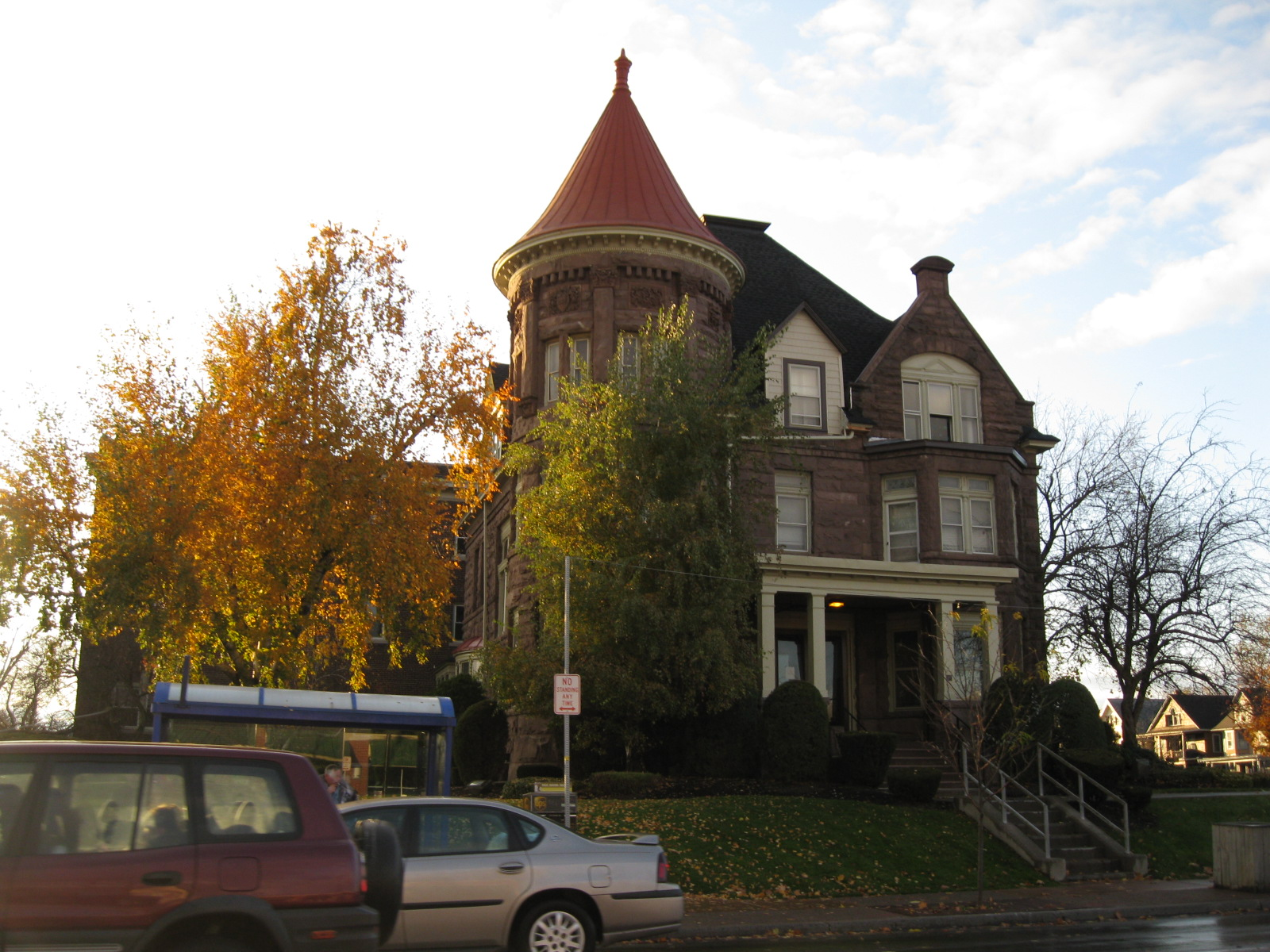
- Eberhardt Mansion, November 2009

- Location within New York Location within the United States
- Location: 2746 Delaware Ave., Kenmore, New York
- Coordinates: 42°57′32″N 78°52′12″W
- Built: 1893
- Architect: Cyrus Kinne Porter
- Architectural style: Neo-Romanesque, Richardsonian Romanesque
- NRHP reference No.: 83001671
- Added to NRHP: September 08, 1983

Eberhardt Mansion is a historic home located at Kenmore in Erie County, New York. It is a locally distinctive example of the Neo-Romanesque style of architecture built in 1893 for Frederick Eberhardt, one of two brothers who originally developed Kenmore. In 1916 the home was purchased by the Wheel Chair Home, Inc., and in 1981 was purchased by coin broker Jack Hunt.

It was listed on the National Register of Historic Places in 1983.
