= Kenmore West Senior High School =

Location
- 33 Highland Parkway; Tonawanda, New York 14223; United States; 42°58′26″N 78°51′51″W

Information
- Type: Public
- Established: 1939; 87 years ago
- School district: Kenmore-Town of Tonawanda School District
- Principal: Shawn Siddall
- Faculty: 127.54 (FTE)
- Grades: 8–12
- Enrollment: 1,276 (2023–2024)
- Student to teacher ratio: 10.00
- Colors: Royal blue and white
- Mascot: Blue Devil
- Website: kenwest.ktufsd.org

Kenmore West Senior High School (nicknamed Ken-West) is one of two public high schools in the Kenmore-Town of Tonawanda School District. The other is Kenmore East Senior High School.

== History ==
=== Founding ===
In 1938, a WPA grant of about $700,000 was received from the federal government toward the creation of a separate building for the senior high school on Highland Parkway, and the school district provided over $1M in additional funds. The 20-acre (81,000 m^{2}) plot on which the school is situated cost $35,000. The school opened in the fall of 1940 with fifty faculty members and 1,250 pupils. In 1959, Kenmore East High School was opened as the district continued to grow. At that time, the Highland Parkway school officially became Kenmore West High School. Raymond Stewart Frazier (1901–1998) was appointed of principal of Kenmore West in 1952.

=== History of the land ===
The 20-acre (81,000 m^{2}) plot is part of what used to be the Philip Pirson homestead, a 75-acre farm.

=== Building expansion and additions ===
The community continued to grow in the subsequent years, requiring a classroom addition to the west wing of school in 1967–1968. In the late 1990s, the school district proposed building a new library information center on the west lawn and an athletic complex east of the original gymnasium. Voters narrowly approved funding for the projects in 1997. The additions were designed by Duchscherer Oberst Design, P.C., an architectural firm in Buffalo. Joseph L. Kopec was the lead architect. The library was completed at a cost of about $10 million in the fall of 2000. The design won an award for educational architecture in the summer of 2001.

Another capital enhancement to the building occurred after a May 2002 fire in the cafeteria bay, causing a multi-month relocation of the cafeteria to the Old Gym while a new cafeteria was erected, opening January 31, 2003, to an appreciative student body.

=== Enrollment and leadership ===
Kenmore West's enrollment grew steadily through about 1970, and reached its peak in 1969 with over 3000 students in grades 10, 11 and 12. Alan Hammon MacGamwell (1926–2004), a 1944 graduate of the school, was appointed its third principal in 1971, after serving as a teacher, coach and assistant principal in the Ken-Ton (Note: Kenmore is a village in the south part of the Town of Tonawanda, and together with the town it is often referred to as Ken-Ton) Schools. In that era, the school boasted large numbers of National Merit Scholarship winners. In 1969, Kenmore West, under coach Jules Yakapovich, won the Niagara Frontier League Football Championship and drew national attention as theoretical national champions, determined statistically by a computer match-up with a Florida high school team. (Note: The distinction of National High School Football Champion was that of a computer operated by South Florida's Junior Super Bowl, a non-profit organization established to pair the nation's top two teams for a postseason game for the National High School Championship. Its president, Ray Smith, said that the rankings were based on statistical and other information compiled and computed by the Digital Products Corporation of Fort Lauderdale. (Alton Evening Telegraph, December 26, 1969, pg. 17) The project, introduced in the fall of 1969, involved playing games on computers and determining, twice a week, theoretical Junior Super Bowl top 20 high school football national rankings. The objective was to invite the top two final teams to play post-season for a national championship title in a Junior Super Bowl. If circumstances prevented an actual meeting of the two top finishers, the play-off for the 1969 Junior Super Bowl Championship would be computerized, as was the case.("Florida Firm Designated as 'Computer Control Center' for Junior Super Bowl," Computers and Automation, Vol. 18, No. 12, November 1969, pg. 63; ISSN 0010-4795) Sportswriters, including one from Buffalo News, opined that Kenmore West earned the title of "National Champion" for its cumulative margin of outscoring its eight opponents in 1969, 389 to 67. ("Ken West Blue Devils blew out the opposition in '69," Buffalo News via TMC News — Technology Marketing Corporation, October 29, 2007); Jules Yakapovich, the head football coach of the 1969 Ken-West Blue Devils wrote a book, The Radar Defense for Winning Football (OCLC 85721). In the flyleaf, he blurbed the phrase, "The Coach of the Number One High School Football Team in the Nation reveals all the secrets of the unique defense that made his squad invincible." ("The Triumphant Turnaround of the Hartsdale Hurricanes," by Harry F. Waters, New York Magazine, November 22, 1971, pg. 52))

MacGamwell retired in 1980 and served the Ken-Ton District on the Board of Education. Another Kenmore graduate, Charles Kristich, class of 1955, succeeded him as principal that year. Douglas H. Smith became Principal in December 1994 and led the 9–12 school building until December 2005. Karen Geelan, former Assistant Principal in the West Seneca School district, was hired as the Principal of grades 9 and 10, and Smith would continue to lead grades 11 and 12. In 2007, Geelan became Lead Principal of the building. Smith transferred to Benjamin Franklin Middle School in 2008 where he was Principal until his retirement in 2010. Geelan earned an educational doctorate from the University of Buffalo in 2011 and left Kenmore West in June of that year to become the Superintendent of Allegany-Limestone Central Schools. Dean R. Johnson, who had been a Kenmore West Assistant Principal from 2008 to 2011, succeeded Geelan in 2011 as principal of Kenmore West. Johnson became principal of Herbert Hoover Middle School in July of 2025. Shawn Siddall, former Principal of Thomas Edison Elementary (and Assistant Principal at Kenmore East,) became the schools ninth Principal. Kayla Cappuccio, Kelly Lambert, and Dr. Denise Grandits are currently assistant principals. Nathan Bourke is the schools Athletic Coordinator.

=== Declining population ===
The Kenmore community, like the rest of Western New York, lost population between 1970 and 1990. Enrollment of Kenmore West dipped to a low of under 1,400 students in the early 1990s, and many teachers were laid off. The Ken-Ton population continues to drop, and teachers and support staff continue to be laid off as the district economic climate changes. In the 2016–2017 school year, after the consolidation of Kenmore Middle School, Kenmore West now houses eighth graders as well as ninth, tenth, eleventh, and twelfth graders.

== Academics ==
In 2013, Kenmore West Senior High School was ranked 74th out of 135 Western New York high schools in terms of academic performance.

=== International Baccalaureate Program ===
In January 2011, Kenmore West was designated as an International Baccalaureate (IB) School. They were the second public school in Western New York with this distinction. As of 2016, only two other high schools in Erie County offered the program: Kenmore East High School and City Honors School. By 2015, about 18% of Kenmore West students participate in the IB Diploma Program.

== Notable alumni ==
- Anita Alvarez, synchronized swimmer and Olympic medalist
- Zach Anner, internet celebrity with cerebral palsy
- Wolf Blitzer, CNN journalist and author (who sent a video to the Class of 2009 graduation and visited Kenmore West on 4/9/10 to speak with the school)
- Jeff Czum, guitarist in the band Cute Is What We Aim For
- Frank H. Easterbrook, Chief Judge of the United States Court of Appeals for the Seventh Circuit
- Gregg Easterbrook, author and journalist
- Geoffrey Gatza, editor, publisher, poet
- Edward Gibson, Skylab astronaut (who spoke to the student body at the 2010 Homecoming rally)
- Green Jellÿ, musicians and theatrical group
- Beth Krom, two-term mayor of Irvine, California, and U.S. congressional candidate
- Dan McFall, NHL hockey player
- Jim McNally, former offensive line coach in the NCAA (1966–1979) and in the NFL (1980–2008)
- Neal Smatresk, marine biologist, former president of the University of Nevada, Las Vegas (2009–2014), current president of the University of North Texas (2014–present)

== School colors and mascot ==
The school's colors are royal blue and white, and the mascot is the Blue Devil. There are many different images used for the Blue Devil all throughout the school, and most have been designed by students. In recent years, the old mascot costume was replaced by a newer, more 'pumped-up' Blue Devil costume.

== Athletics ==
The Blue Devils compete in the Niagara Frontier League (NFL) in most sports. Exceptions include the football team which competes in the Class AA North division and the gymnastics team which competes in the Erie County Interscholastic Conference (ECIC) Division I. The school's sports teams have produced numerous championships throughout the school's 60-year history. The Blue Devils have a long-standing cross-town rivalry with Kenmore East High School. Sports offered are:

Basketball

- Boys' basketball

1978: Advanced to the New York State Basketball Championship final game (Note: The Kenmore West Blue Devils boys basketball team, coached by Dick Harvey, won the Niagara Division of the Niagara Frontier League, Niagara Division Boys Basketball Championship. They won the championship title for the New York State Class VI, Class AA boys basketball; but lost to the Mount Vernon Knights in the New York State Public High School Athletic Association Basketball Tournament ("West's Great Season Is Finally Over," by Ed Slowinski, Tonawanda News, March 22, 1978, pg. 11) In 2006, Dick Harvey was inducted into the Greater Buffalo Sports Hall of Fame.)

- Girls' basketball

Football

- Voted #1 in New York by the New York State Sportswriters Association in 1969
- New York state champions: 1969
- Cited as "National Champions" in 1969 by a computer calculation operated by the Junior Super Bowl

Flag Football

- 2025 Inaugural year, crowned Section VI Class A Champions with Head Coach Dan Hannon winning Coach of the Year.

Soccer

- Boys' soccer
- Girls' soccer

Swimming

- Boys' Swimming, NFL Champions 1998, 1999, 2025
- Girls' Swimming, NFL Champions 2020, 2021, 2022

Track and field

- Cross country
- Indoor track
- Outdoor Track & Field

Tennis

- Boys' tennis
- Girls' tennis

Volleyball

- Boys' volleyball
- Girls' volleyball

Other

- Golf
- Gymnastics- the program ended in June 2024.
- Boys' Ice hockey
- Girls Ice Hockey
- Field hockey
- Softball

- New York state champions: 2002

- Wrestling
