= Jules Yakapovich =

American football player and coach (1921–1993)

Jules Yakapovich (1921–1993) was an American football coach and former NFL player for the Detroit Lions.

Born in Tonawanda, New York, he served during World War II as a U.S. Marine Corps lieutenant. Yakapovich was head football coach at Kenmore West High School in New York from 1950 to 1976. His undefeated 1969 team was named number-one in the state by the New York State Scholastic Writers Association and chosen number-one in the nation by the Junior Super Bowl Committee, which at the time published the principal national ranking of high school football.

Yakapovich devised the all-standing "radar defense" in which a defender's initial movement is lateral, rather than forward or backward. The radar defense was influential in college football during the 1970s and remains in occasional use in professional American football, such as in the Buffalo Bills-Dallas Cowboys game of October 2007.

Quotation:

Hard work is often not followed by success, a puzzling phenomenon for the young mind. But it is better to follow the hard path that may be rewarded than not to aspire to any goal at all.

== Bibliography ==
- —— The Radar Defense for Winning Football, Prentice-Hall, 1970.
