= Tonawanda Municipal Building =

- U.S. National Register of Historic Places
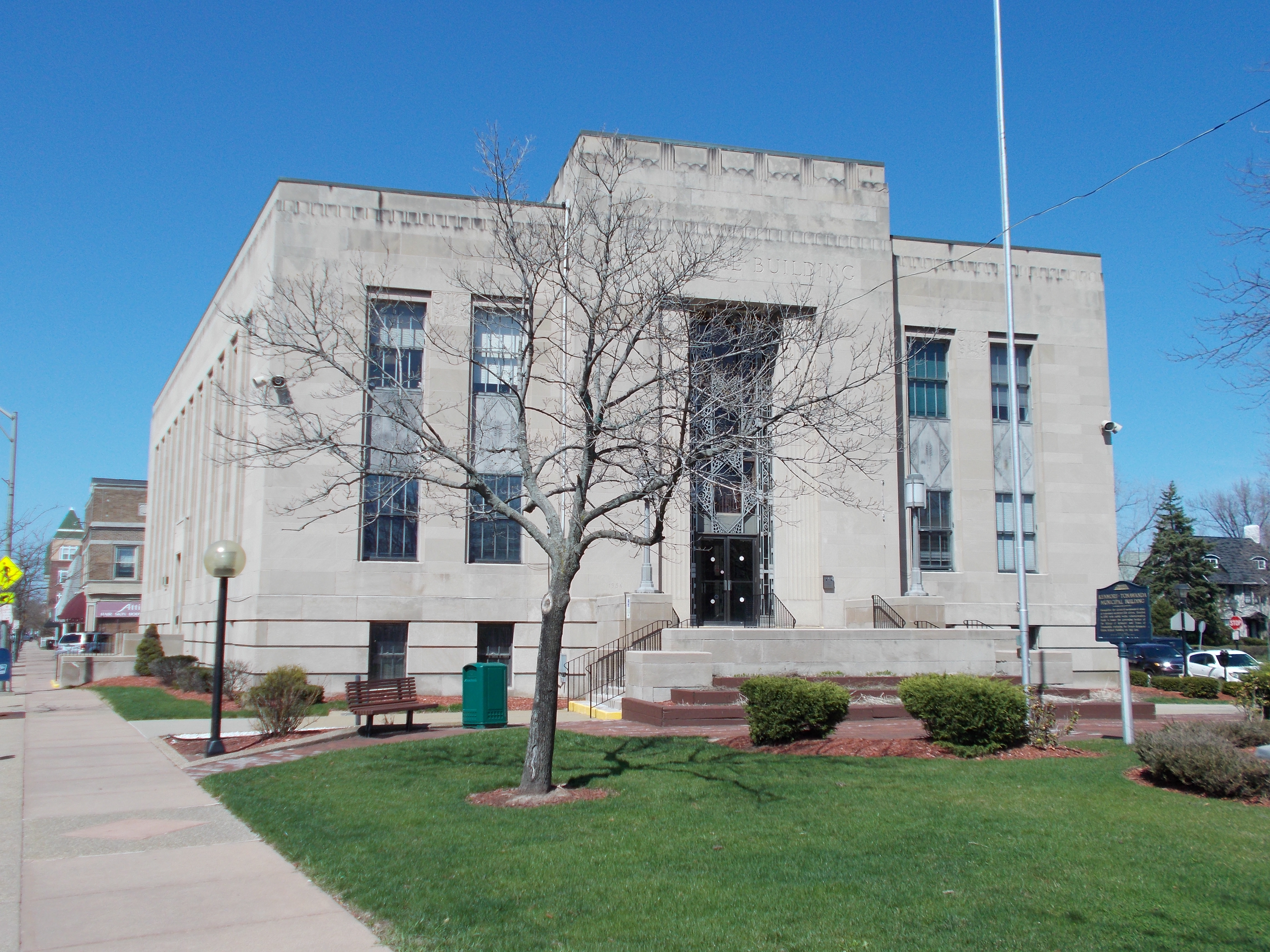
- Tonawanda Municipal Building, April 2013

- Location within New York Location within the United States
- Location: 2919 Delaware Ave., Kenmore, New York
- Coordinates: 42°57′49″N 78°52′11″W
- Area: Less than one acre
- Built: 1936
- Built by: John W. Cowper, Co., Inc.
- Architect: Green and James
- Architectural style: Art Deco
- NRHP reference No.: 13000370
- Added to NRHP: June 12, 2013

Tonawanda Municipal Building is a historic municipal building located at Kenmore in Erie County, New York. It was designed by the noted Buffalo architecture firm Green and James and built in 1936 with funds provide by the Works Progress Administration. It is a two-story, steel frame and brick building clad in limestone with Art Deco design elements. The building serves as home to both the Village of Kenmore and Town of Tonawanda governments.

It was listed on the National Register of Historic Places in 2013.

== Gallery ==
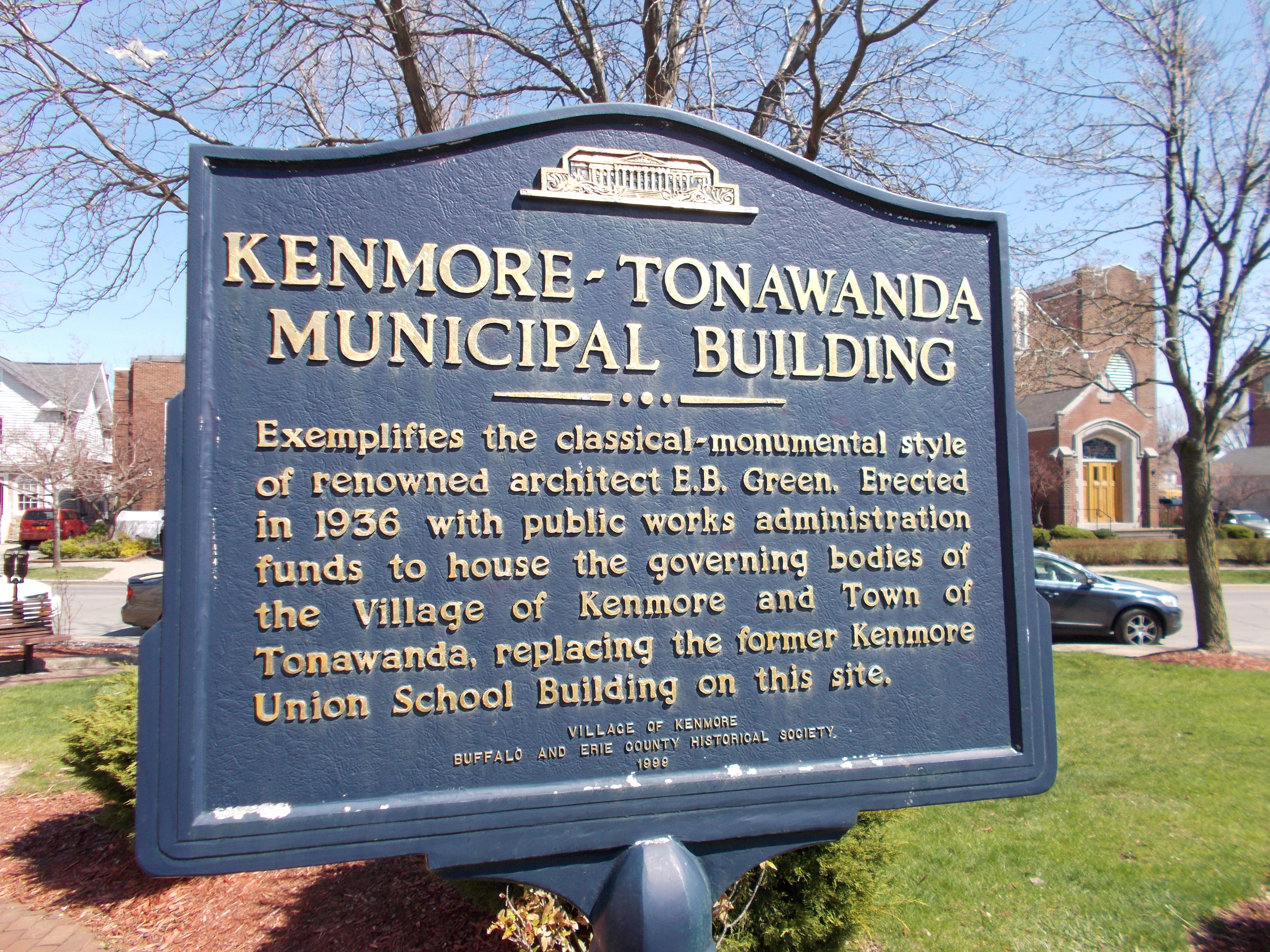
Tonawanda Municipal Building Historical Marker, Kenmore, NY, April 2013
