= Carlin Hartman =

American basketball player and coach (born 1972)

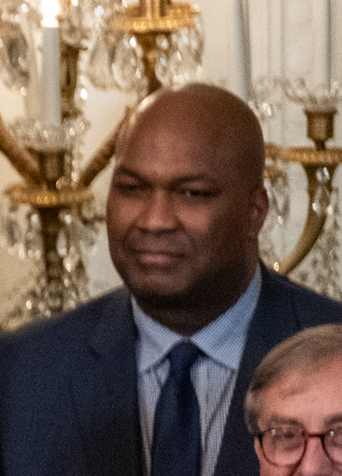
- Hartman at the White House in 2025

Current position
- Title: Associate head coach
- Team: Florida
- Conference: Southeastern Conference

Biographical details
- Born: August 14, 1972 (age 54); Grand Island, New York, U.S.

Playing career
- 1990–1994: Tulane
- 1994: Rapid City Thrillers
- 1994–1996: Shreveport Crawdads / Storm

Coaching career (HC unless noted)
- 1996–1997: Rice (assistant)
- 1997–1998: McNeese (assistant)
- 2002–2004: Rice (director of operations)
- 2004–2005: Louisiana (assistant)
- 2005–2008: Richmond (assistant)
- 2008–2009: Centenary (assistant)
- 2009–2010: James Madison (assistant)
- 2010–2014: Columbia (associate HC)
- 2014–2016: Rice (associate HC)
- 2016–2021: Oklahoma (assistant)
- 2021–2022: UNLV (assistant)
- 2022–present: Florida (associate HC)

Accomplishments and honors

Championships
- NCAA Division I tournament (2025)

Awards
- CBA All-Rookie Team (1995); Metro Conference All-Freshman Team (1991)

Carlin Hartman (born August 14, 1972) is a basketball coach and former player, currently the associate head coach at the University of Florida. He has been an assistant coach in the NCAA for over 30 years. Hartman played for the Tulane Green Wave, Rapid City Thrillers and Shreveport Crawdads / Storm.

== Playing career ==
He is a 1990 graduate of Grand Island High School in Grand Island, New York. As a senior, he was an honorable mention McDonald's All-American, scoring a standing school-record 1,513 points. He attended Tulane University from 1990 until 1994. He was on the Metro Conference All-Freshman Team in 1991 and was an All-Conference honorable mention in 1993 and 1994. Hartman was the 6th man on Tulane teams that made the NCAA tournament in 1992 and 1993. The 1992 team was the first team in program history to make the NCAA tournament and first to win a game, upsetting higher seeded St. John's. The following season they upset Kansas State University.

Hartman finished his career at Tulane 3rd in career field goal percentage (52.8%), 7th in career steals (146), and 10th in career points scored (1,180). Hartman was selected by the Rapid City Thrillers of the Continental Basketball Association in the third round of the 1994 CBA draft. In December 1994, he was traded to the Shreveport Crawdads for Fennis Dembo, 1st and 3rd round picks in the 1995 CBA draft. Hartman earned All-Rookie honors in 1994–95. The following season, Shreveport renamed from the Crawdads to the Storm before the franchise folded in September 1996.

In February 2011, Hartman was named to Tulane's All-Decade Team (1990s), as a part of the Green Wave's celebration of 100 years of basketball. He was inducted into the Tulane Hall of Fame, along with his 1991–92 team, as part of the 2020 induction class. In 2023, Hartman was inducted on his own individual merits into the Tulane Hall of Fame. In 2024, he was inducted in the inaugural class to the Grand Island High School Athletics Hall of Fame.

== Personal life ==
Hartman is married to his wife, Christine, and have four children: Sydney, Kailyn, Tess and Joseph. Their son Joseph is a 6'6" shooting guard for the Michigan Wolverines.
