= Holy Angels Academy (Buffalo, New York) =

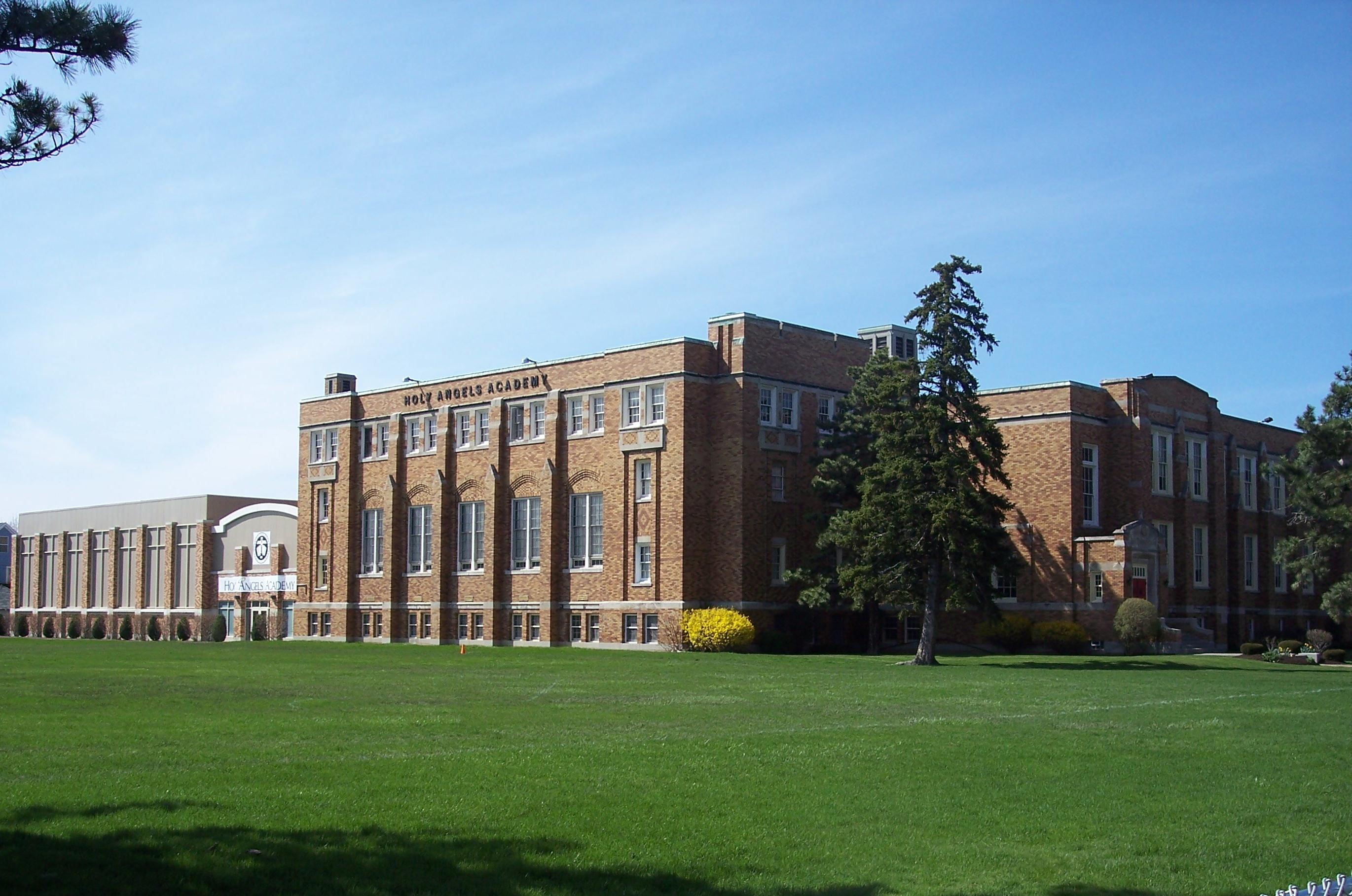

Location
- 24 Shoshone Street; Buffalo, (Erie County), New York 14214; United States; 42°56′54″N 78°50′10″W

Information
- Type: Private, All-Female
- Religious affiliation: Roman Catholic
- Established: 1861
- Closed: 2013
- Grades: 6 -12
- Colors: Navy and Gray
- Athletics conference: Mgsr. Martin Athletic Association
- Team name: The Angels
- Accreditation: Middle States Association of Colleges and Schools
- Publication: Wings (literary magazine)
- Yearbook: Angelus
- Tuition: 9,200 2013-2014 plus 400.00 Activity fee
- Website: www.holyangelsacademy.org

Holy Angels Academy was a former all-girls, private, Roman Catholic high school in Buffalo, New York.

== Background ==
Holy Angels Academy was established in 1861.

It was founded by the Grey Nuns of the Sacred Heart who went on to establish D'Youville University. Its current address is on Hertel Avenue in North Buffalo, but was founded on the West Side of Buffalo.

On April 30, 2013, Holy Angels staff announced that 2012-2013 would be the final academic year. An e-mail to parents stated, "The Board of Trustees and the Grey Nuns of the Sacred Heart made this decision after many weeks of discussion, data analysis, and deliberation among themselves and with school leaders."

The Holy Angels building is now occupied by the Charter School for Applied Technologies middle school.

== Academics ==
In 2009, Holy Angels Academy was ranked 11th out of 131 Western New York high schools in terms of academic performance.

== See also ==
- Holy Angels Church (Buffalo, New York)
- Charter School for Applied Technologies
