= Rusty Jeffers =

American professional bodybuilder

- Professional bodybuilder
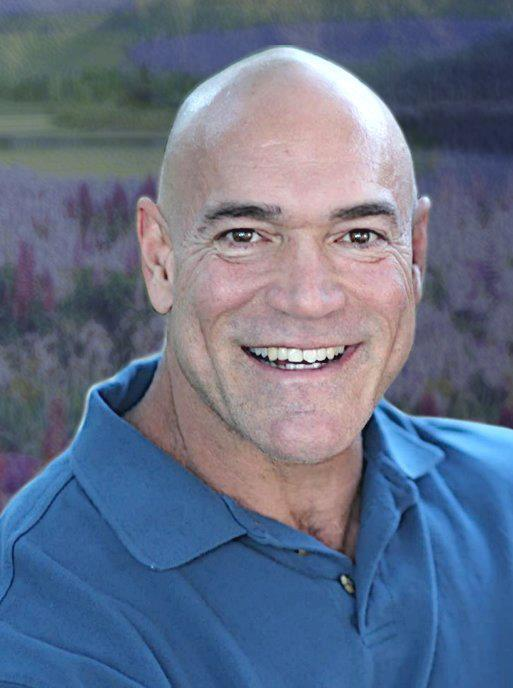
- Jeffers in 2011

Personal info
- Born: May 14, 1964 (age 61); Kenmore, New York, U.S.

Best statistics
- Height: 5'9.5"
- Weight: 230 - 235 lb (Contest)

Professional (Pro) career
- Pro-debut: Ironman Pro; 2005
- Best win: Legions Sports Fest Pro Masters, 50+ Class; 2021
- Active: 1981 - 2024

Rusty Jeffers (born May 14, 1964, Kenmore, New York) is an American IFBB professional bodybuilder and a former performer in adult entertainment under the alias Carl Hardwick. He grew up in Georgia and Boulder, Colorado and now lives in Phoenix, Arizona. Jeffers started bodybuilding at 12 and competed as early as at the age of 14. He won his first title at the age of 17 and won three years in a row in Teenage Arizona. He got his professional status in 2004 Masters National Championships.

Jeffers released a Pose Like a Pro DVD on his own in 2006 to teach athletes how to pose.

In 2002, Jeffers sat for a revealing interview with freelance writer Rod Labbe. Entitled "Slugging it Out," it ran in MuscleMag International.

Jeffers is teaming up with World Physique & Athletics Association (WPAA) to hold a bodybuilding show in his name: the 2015 Rusty Jeffers Southwest Championships on April 11, 2015.

Rusty won in Masters Pro 50+ class in 2014 Pittsburgh Pro. After 7 years, Rusty competed again in 2021 IFBB Pro Legion Masters Championship in October and won the 40+ class.

In 2023, Rusty competed in IFBB Pro West Coast Classic, Masters Men 50+ and won.

In 2024, Rusty competed in Chicago Masters Pro, 55+ & 60+, and Won.

== Contest history ==
| Year | Competition | Class | Result |
|---|---|---|---|
| 1981 | Teenage Arizona | -- | Overall |
| 1982 | Teenage Arizona | -- | Overall |
| 1983 | Teenage Arizona | -- | Overall |
| 1987 | AAU Copper Classic | Heavyweight | Heavyweight & Overall |
| 1987 | AAU Mr. Tucson | Heavyweight | Runner-up |
| 1988 | AAU Copper Classic | Heavyweight | Overall |
| 1989 | Mr. & Ms. Arizona Championships | Mixed Pair | Overall with wife |
| 1989 | AAU Mr. Arizona | Heavyweight | Heavyweight & Overall |
| 1990 | NPC Orange County | Heavyweight | Runner-up |
| 1991 | Palm Springs Classic | Heavyweight | Heavyweight & Overall |
| 1991 | AAU Grand Canyon | Heavyweight | 3rd |
| 1991 | NPC Ironman | Heavyweight | 5th |
| 1992 | AAU Southwest Open | Heavyweight | 2nd |
| 1992 | NPC Ironman | Heavyweight | 1st & Overall |
| 1994 | NPC Ironman | Heavyweight | Heavyweight |
| 1994 | Excalibur | Heavyweight | Heavyweight & Overall |
| 1995 | NPC USA | Heavyweight | 16th |
| 1996 | NPC Nationals | Heavyweight | 16th |
| 1998 | NPC USA | Heavyweight | 9th |
| 1999 | Los Angeles Championships | Heavyweight | Overall |
| 1999 | NPC USA | Heavyweight | 6th |
| 1999 | Arizona | Heavyweight | Heavyweight & Overall |
| 2001 | Mid USA | Heavyweight | Heavyweight & Overall |
| 2001 | NPC USA | Heavyweight | -- |
| 2002 | NPC USA | Heavyweight | 10th |
| 2002 | NPC Nationals | Super Heavyweight | 12th |
| 2003 | Excalibur - Los Angeles | Super Heavyweight | 2nd |
| 2003 | San Diego World Gym Classic | Super Heavyweight | Super Heavyweight & Overall |
| 2003 | Las Vegas Classic | Super Heavyweight | Super Heavyweight |
| 2003 | NPC Nationals | Super Heavyweight | 16th |
| 2003 | NPC Western Regional | Super Heavyweight | Super Heavyweight |
| 2004 | NPC USA | Super Heavyweight | 2nd |
| 2004 | NPC Masters National | Super Heavyweight | Super Heavyweight & Overall (Pro Card) |
| 2005 | Iron Man Pro | Pro | 12th |
| 2005 | San Francisco Pro | Pro | 16th |
| 2005 | Charlotte Pro | Pro | 12th |
| 2005 | Mr. Olympia Wildcard Showdown | Pro | 5th |
| 2006 | Masters Pro World Championships | Pro Masters | 8th |
| 2007 | Iron Man Pro | Pro | 12th |
| 2007 | Sacramento Grand Prix | Pro | 11th |
| 2008 | Iron Man Pro | Pro | 17th |
| 2008 | Atlantic City Pro | Pro Masters | 11th |
| 2009 | Iron Man Pro | Pro | 16th |
| 2009 | Australian Pro | Pro | 7th |
| 2010 | Phoenix Pro | Pro | 16th |
| 2010 | Australian Pro | Pro | 12th |
| 2012 | Flex Pro | Pro | 15th |
| 2012 | Desert Muscle Classic | Pro 212 | 4th |
| 2014 | Pittsburgh Pro Masters | Pro Master 50+ | 1st |
| 2021 | IFBB Pro League Legions Sports Fest Pro Masters Championship | Pro Masters 50+ | 1st |
| 2022 | IFBB Masters World Pro Championship | Pro Masters 40+ | 1st |
| 2023 | IFBB Pro West Coast Classic | Pro Masters 50+ | 1st |
| 2024 | IFBB Chicago Masters Pro | Pro Masters 55+ & 60+ | 1st |
| 2026 | IFBB Emerald Cup Masters Pro | Pro Masters 60+ | 1st |

== Adult entertainment ==
Jeffers performed under the name "Carl Hardwick" from 1997 to 2003, appearing in nine films for Colt Studio Group, Buckshot and Jimmy Z Productions. He also modeled nude for still beefcake photography. Fans have cited his competition-worthy muscles and copious body hair as defining attributes of Jeffers as Hardwick.

== See also ==
- International Federation of BodyBuilders
- Bodybuilding
- List of male professional bodybuilders
- List of female professional bodybuilders
