= Kenmore-Town of Tonawanda School District =

School district in New York, United States

Address
- 1500 Colvin Boulevard Buffalo, New York, 14223; United States

District information
- Type: Public
- Grades: PreK–12
- NCES District ID: 3616230

Students and staff
- Students: 6,638 (2020–2021)
- Teachers: 653.5 (on an FTE basis)
- Staff: 574.06 (on an FTE basis)
- Student–teacher ratio: 10.16:1

Other information
- Website: www.ktufsd.org

The Kenmore-Town of Tonawanda Union Free School District, also called the Ken-Ton School District, or simply Ken-Ton Schools, serves Kenmore and a majority of the Town of Tonawanda in New York State. It is one of the largest in Western New York.

== Central Office Location ==
The district Central Office is located at 1500 Colvin Blvd.

=== Current Administrators ===
Sabatino Cimato; Superintendent of Schools

Kelly White; Assistant Superintendent of Curriculum, Leadership, & Instruction

- Mary Lynn Bieron; Staff Development Center Director
- Lisa Cross; Executive Director of Secondary Education
- Heather Fleming; Director of Technology Integration
- Anne Martell; Director of K-12 Education
- Michael Muscarella; Executive Director of Elementary Education
- Kari Schultz; Family Support Center Director
- Frank Spagnolo; Director of Informational Data and Accountability/CIO

Matthew Bystrak; Assistant Superintendent of Student Services

- Matthew Raines; Executive Director of Secondary Special Education
- Ashley Digati; Executive Director of Elementary Special Education
- Dina Ferraraccio; Director of School Culture
- Katherine Stellrecht; Medical Director
- Gretchen Sukdolak; Interim Director of Special Education; Charter/Parochial/Agencies

Jeffery Richards; Assistant Superintendent of Human Resources

- Liza Acanfora; Director of Adult & Community Education
- Lindsay Bergman; Director of Health, Physical Education, and Athletics
- Amanda Dermott; Executive Director of Human Resources

Nicole Morasco; Assistant Superintendent of Finance

- Timothy Ames; Director of Facilities
- Connie D. Miner; Grants Coordinator
- Kim Roll; Director of Food Services
- Graham Violino; Director of Transportation
- Margaret Weglarski; District Treasurer

=== Former Superintendents ===
The following individuals have served as Superintendent of Schools of the Kenmore-Town of Tonawanda Union Free School District:

- Frank C. Densberger, 1915-1953
- Carl Baisch, 1953-1963
- C. Sherwood Miller, 1963-1975
- Philip Tieman, 1975-1979
- Richard Lane, 1979-1980
- John Helfrich, 1981-1994
- Robert Freeland, 1994
- Robert McClure, 1994-1998
- Robert Fort, 1998
- David Paciencia, 1998-2000
- Steven Achramovitch, 2001-2006
- Anne Marotta, 2006-2007
- Mark Mondanaro, 2007-2014
- Dawn Mirand, 2014-2017
- Stephen Bovino, 2017-2020

== Open Schools ==
At its enrollment peak the district housed 22,000 students in 23 school buildings. The district now operates 9 schools with an enrollment of 6,875. As of 2016, the five Elementary schools house grades Pre-K to 4th Grade, Middle schools house grades 5 through 7, and High schools grades 8 through 12.

- Kenmore East High School (Built in 1959) Opened on September 9, 1959
- Kenmore West Senior High School (Built in 1939) Cornerstone laid on June 17, 1939. Opened on September 4, 1940 and dedicated on December 11, 1940
- Kenmore Junior-Senior High School (Built in 1923) Cornerstone laid on September 29, 1923. Opened and dedicated on November 18, 1924. An addition was built in 1928, opened on January 7, 1929, and dedicated on April 19, 1929. Formerly housed Kenmore Junior High/Middle School (September 4, 1940 - June 21, 2016) Housed various district programs from 2016-2023 including the Big Picture High School program, Adult and Community Education, and the Staff Development Center. Re-opened as Kenmore Junior-Senior in 2023.
- Benjamin Franklin Middle School (Built in 1952) Opened on October 25, 1954 for elementary pupils and on September 7, 1955 solely as a junior high school. Dedicated on June 6, 1956.
- Herbert Hoover Middle School (Built in 1958) Opened on February 3, 1958
- Thomas A. Edison Elementary School (Built in 1954) Opened on September 7, 1955
- Benjamin Franklin Elementary School (Built in 1952) Opened on September 8, 1953. Dedicated on June 6, 1956.
- Oliver Wendell Holmes Elementary School (Built in 1964) Cornerstone laid at the dedication on October 19, 1964. Opened on November 2, 1964.
- Herbert Hoover Elementary School (Built in 1951) Opened on September 5, 1951. Dedicated on October 10, 1951 by former President Hoover.
- Charles E. Lindbergh Elementary School (Built in 1929) Cornerstone laid on October 3, 1929. Opened on September 3, 1930 and dedicated on June 16, 1931
- Alexander Hamilton School (Built in 1958) Opened on September 9, 1959 and closed on June 21, 2016. Re-opened in the Fall of 2021 as the district's Pre-K Building.

== Closed Schools ==
- Warren G. Harding Elementary School (54 Riverdale Ave, Buffalo, NY 14207) Opened in 1921 and sold in 1965/1966 to the Town Boys and Girls Club
- Dewitt Clinton Elementary School (345 McConkey Dr, Buffalo, NY 14223) Grades K-6, built in 1959 and opened on January 4, 1960. Closed in 1974, now New Covenant Church
- Horace Mann Elementary School (55 Ralston Ave, Kenmore, NY 14217) Grades K-6, opened on February 24, 1958 and closed in June 1976 now Westchester Park Apartments for senior citizens and permanently disabled individuals.
- Robert Frost Elementary School (291 Ensminger Rd, Tonawanda, NY 14150) Grades K-3, built in 1962, closed 1977 now the Ensminger Senior Citizen Center
- Heritage Elementary School (169 Heritage Rd, Tonawanda, NY 14150) Grades K-3, opened on September 4, 1963 and closed in 1974, building sold to People Inc.
- Jane Addams Elementary School (Cortland Ave & Belcher Ave Town of Tonawanda) Grades K-3, Opened on September 4, 1957 and closed on June 30, 1978, demolished to build Center Court Commons 28 residential homes
- Betsy Ross Elementary School (135 Wilber Ave, Kenmore, NY 14217) Grades K-2, Opened on September 30, 1957, closed in 1980, now owned by Village of Kenmore and operates as a Community Center
- Henry W. Longfellow Elementary School (255 Myron Ave, Buffalo, NY 14217), Grades K-3, built and opened on September 4, 1957, closed on June 30, 1981
- Abraham Lincoln Elementary School (1 Cambridge St, Buffalo, NY 14223) Opened in September 1925, Grades K-8. Dedicated on November 18, 1925. Closed in 1981 now a Stanley G. Falk School
- Lincoln House Annex, closed in 1977
- Green Acres Elementary School (205 Yorkshire Rd, Tonawanda, NY 14150) Grades K-6, built in 1956, opened on April 1, 1957, closed on June 30, 1981 now owned by Heritage Centers ARC of WNY Program.
- Brighton Elementary School (300 Fries Rd, Tonawanda, NY 14150), Grades K-6, opened on September 7, 1955 and closed on June 30, 1978
- Philip Sheridan Elementary School (3200 Elmwood Ave, Buffalo, NY 14217) built in 1948 (cornerstone laid on December 4, 1948), opened on September 7, 1949, closed in 1983, used by school district programs from its closure until 2018 when it was sold to CMS rentals for Senior Housing.
- Sheridan Parkside Elementary School (169 Sheridan Parkside Dr, Tonawanda, NY 14150) Built in 1955, closed in June 1982 now owned by Town of Tonawanda and operates as a Community Center, Head Start, Home of the Towne Players Theater Co, Meals on Wheels, the Erie Count Labor Board and Work Readiness Skills, and the Town of Tonawanda Historical Society.
- Sheridan Annex, Closed in 1975
- George Washington Elementary School (1 Delaware Rd, Buffalo, NY 14217) Opened in December 1910 as Kenmore High School. Dedicated on March 3, 1911. Closed on June 23, 1982, converted to luxury apartments
- Jefferson Elementary School (250-262 Athens Blvd, Buffalo, NY 14223) Built and opened in 1956, closed in 2013. The district rents the space to the Ken-Ton Closet and the Town of Tonawanda Youth/Teen Center. Currently operating as Northmore Nursery School.
- Roosevelt Elementary School (283 Washington Ave, Kenmore, NY 14217) Dedicated on August 30, 1928. Opened on September 4, 1928 and closed on June 21, 2016, now rented by Stanley G. Falk School
