= Chuck McCoy =

Canadian radio executive

Chuck McCoy is a Canadian radio executive. His career began in the 1960s and continued into the 1970s as an announcer and disc jockey in several radio stations throughout Canada. He then became a program director, started a consulting firm, and is now an executive for Rogers Broadcasting. In 2008 he was inducted into the Canadian Music Industry Hall of Fame.

== Announcer ==
Chuck McCoy started his radio career as an announcer and disc jockey in the 1960s and 1970s. His first station was CKY-FM in Winnipeg, then he moved on to CJME in Regina, Saskatchewan, CKFH in Toronto, CHLO AM in St. Thomas, and CJRN in Niagara Falls.

== Program director ==
After his stint at CJRN, McCoy was hired by CHUM Limited as a part of the programming team at CHUM (AM) in Toronto then in 1973 they sent him to Vancouver to be the program director of their newly purchased CKVN, which then became CFUN.

By 1975 McCoy brought CFUN to the number one spot in Vancouver radio market. He established aggressive marketing techniques including television ads, and frequent giveaways to increase the profile of the station. He left CFUN and CHUM Limited in late 1977 and eventually ended up as program coordinator for Moffat Communications

McCoy left Moffat in 1986 to form a radio consulting company with Pat Bohn, McCoy-Bohn Communications International

== Executive ==
From the early 1990s to today McCoy has been climbing the corporate ladder at the Rogers Broadcasting Group. He started as vice president and general manager of CKKS-FM, and in 1991 also became general manager of CKWX.

Rogers then, in 1999, promoted him to vice president of programming for all of their Toronto stations, which include CHFI, CFTR, and CISS-FM. CISS had been recently bought by Rogers and McCoy changed the format from country to top 40. In 2010 he then was elevated to vice president and regional manager for all of Toronto and Kitchener. He is currently working on expanding the company's holdings into London, Ontario by purchasing CHST-FM from CTV.

== Accolades ==
McCoy was doubly honored by the Canadian radio industry in 2009. At the Canadian Music Industry Awards he received a Lifetime Achievement Award and was inducted into the Canadian Music Industry Hall of Fame.
