= Charter School for Applied Technologies =

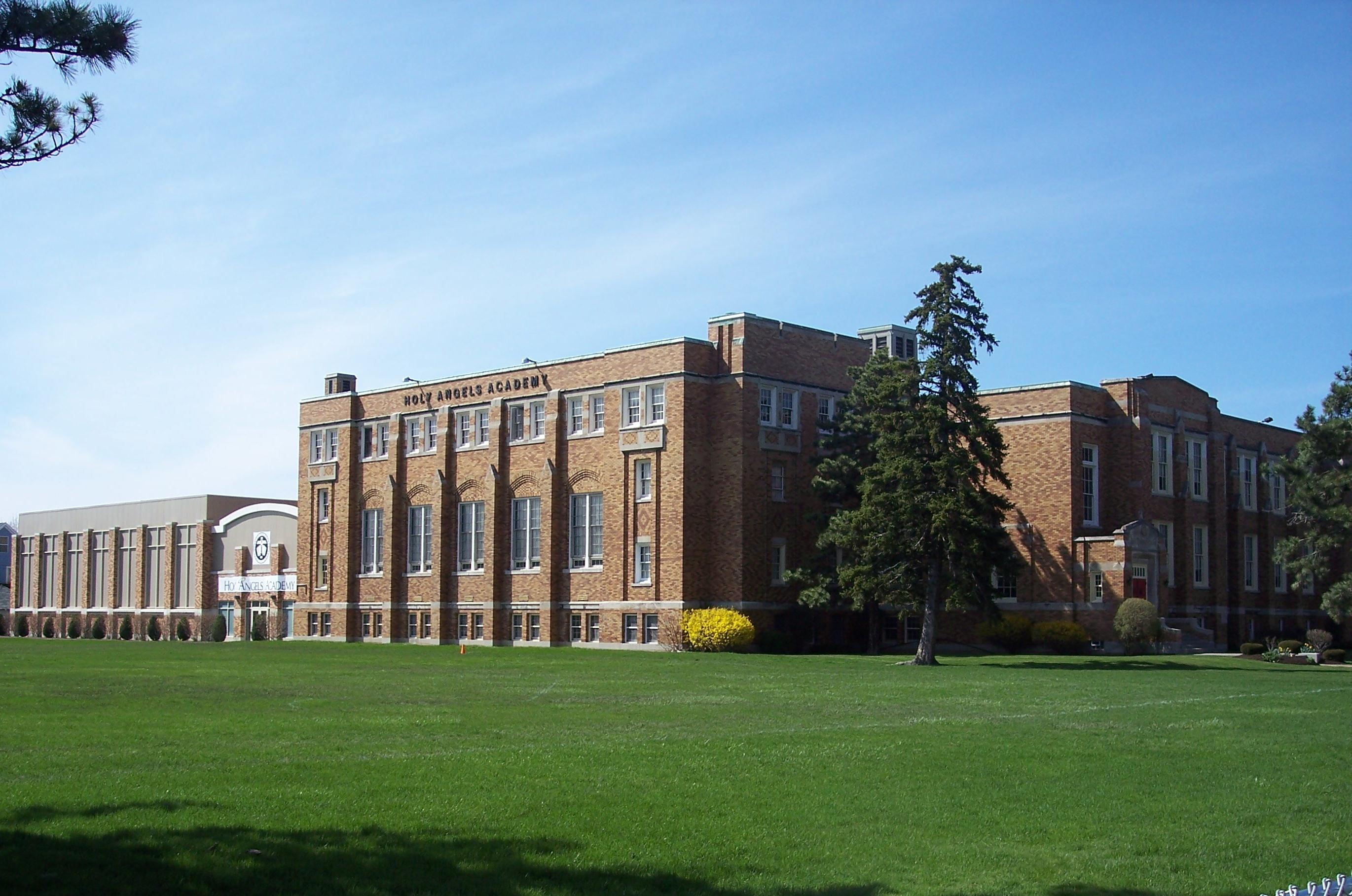

Location
- Buffalo, New York; United States; 42.965493°N 78.895664°W

Information
- Type: Charter school
- Motto: "Where Every Day Is Career Day"
- Established: April 20th, 2001
- Superintendent: Eon Verrall
- Principal: Brett Lutterbein (high school)
- Grades: K-12
- Enrollment: 2357
- Campus type: Urban
- Colors: Yellow and navy blue
- Team name: Eagles

Charter School for Applied Technologies (CSAT) is a charter school located in Buffalo, New York.

Charter School for Applied Technologies was founded in 2001 as a K–6 school serving about 700 students. It has since then expanded into a K–12 school with three different campuses. It is the largest charter school in New York State. It is also one of the only charter schools in New York State to offer a K–12 education.

There are three different buildings for the elementary school (K–5), middle school (6–8) and the high school (9–12). All three are located in Buffalo, New York, 14207 (except the middle school, which is in zip code 14214).

- The elementary school, Charter School for Applied Technologies Elementary School, opened in 2001. It is the main building and is located at 2303 Kenmore Ave.
- The middle school, Charter Middle School for Applied Technologies Middle School, in the former (until 2013) Holy Angels Academy, is located at 24 Shoshone St. The 2014–2015 school year was the first year of CSAT being occupied in the former Holy Angels Academy building.
- The high school, Charter School for Applied Technologies High School, is located at 2245 Kenmore Ave.
- Charter School for Applied Technology has an enrollment of about 2367 students from over 18 local school districts in Erie and Niagara County. Approximately 80% of students reside in the city of Buffalo.
- CSAT's mission is to prepare students to attain family-sustaining careers by integrating career exploration and a lifelong learning culture.
