= Kenmore East High School =

Kenmore East Senior High School

Location
- 350 Fries Rd. Town of Tonawanda, NY 14150
- Coordinates: 42.9900°N 78.8343°W

Information
- Type: Public
- Established: 1959
- School district: Kenmore-Town of Tonawanda School District
- Principal: Trevor Brown
- Faculty: 104.47 (FTE)
- Grades: 8-12
- Enrollment: 1,054 (2023-2024)
- Student to teacher ratio: 10.09
- Colors: Navy Blue and Gold
- Mascot: Bulldog
- Website: Link

Kenmore East High School (nicknamed Ken-East; also Kenmore East Senior High School) is a high school in the Town of Tonawanda, New York. Its name refers to the Village of Kenmore in New York. The school's mascot is a bulldog. The school was founded in 1959, and is the sister school to Kenmore West Senior High School.

== Overview ==
Kenmore East is located in the Town of Tonawanda, New York, a suburb of Buffalo. It is one of three high schools within the Ken-Ton School District. Mr. Trevor Brown is the current Principal, while Joseph Greco and Angela Carriero-Dzielski are Assistant Principals, and Nathan Bourke is the schools Athletics Coordinator.

== Athletics ==
Kenmore East features three different competitive levels of play - junior varsity, varsity, and club sports. Some sports have been combined with Kenmore West to form one unified Kenmore Team, the most notable being the Girls Swim Team's Niagara Frontier League Championship winning streak and the Girls Hockey state championship in 2013.

- Baseball
- Basketball (Girls & Boys)
- Bowling
- Cheerleading
- Cross Country
- Field Hockey
- Football
- Golf
- Gymnastics
- Hockey (Girls & Boys)
- Lacrosse (Girls & Boys)
- Rifle
- Soccer (Girls & Boys)
- Softball
- Swimming

Girls: NFL Champions: 1995, 1998, 2020, 2021, 2022 Boys: NFL Champions: 1976, 2025

- Tennis (Girls & Boys)
- Track

Boys: NFL Champions 2022, 2025 Girls:

- Volleyball (Girls & Boys)
- Wrestling

== Notable alumni ==
- Keith Franke/Adrian Adonis (former undisputed world wrestling champion)
- Cal Kern, owner of the Niagara Power
- Jon L. Luther CEO of Dunkin' Brands as well as the chairman of Wingstop and many others
- Billy Sheehan, rock bass guitar player (Talas, David Lee Roth Band, Mr. Big)
- James Oberg (1962), author and Soviet space expert
- Paul Vogt, actor and comedian
- Jeff Glor, CBS News anchor
- Jonah Heim, Major League Baseball catcher

== See also ==
- Kenmore-Town of Tonawanda School District
