= Grand Island Central School District =

School district in the U.S. state of New York

Location
- Grand Island, New York

District information
- Grades: K-12
- Superintendent: Brian S. Graham
- Schools: 5

Students and staff
- District mascot: Vikings

Other information
- Website: Grand Island Central School District

The Grand Island Central School District is a public school district serving the town of Grand Island in Erie County, New York. It operates five schools: three elementary schools, a middle school, and a high school. The middle school and high school share a single building and address at 1100 Ransom Road, which also houses the district offices.

As of the 2024–25 school year, the district enrolled approximately 2,800 students. Minority enrollment is about 10 percent, and roughly 17.5 percent of students are eligible for free or reduced-price meals.

== History ==
Charlotte Sidway School, opened on February 1, 1937, was the first school built under the newly centralized Grand Island district. It operated until 1983, after which the building was leased to local businesses, and reopened as an elementary school in 1993.

Grand Island Senior High School opened in September 1963 and initially housed both the junior and senior high schools. The middle school opened separately on April 14, 1969 as Grand Island Middle School, and was renamed Veronica E. Connor Middle School in December 1996 for the district's longtime superintendent.

== Academics ==
The district participates in Erie 1 BOCES, through which students can access career and technical education programs.

In 2013, the district was named to the honor roll in Business First's annual academic ranking of Western New York school districts, one of 15 districts out of 97 analyzed to score at least 90 points on the publication's 100-point scale. It placed 11th overall that year and ninth the year before.

== Administration ==
The district offices are located at 1100 Ransom Road in Grand Island. The current superintendent is Brian Graham, who has held the position since 2016. The district is governed by a seven-member board of education whose members serve three-year terms. As of the 2022–23 school year, it employed 245 full-time classroom teachers, with a student–teacher ratio of about 11.7 to 1.

== Music ==
In 2012, the district was named one of the Best Communities for Music Education in the United States by the NAMM Foundation, one of 176 districts recognized nationally that year.

== Facilities ==
Between 2013 and 2017, the district completed a $58 million capital improvement project that included a new technology wing at the high school.

In January 2019, voters approved a $24.1 million capital project by a margin of 547 to 257. The work included more secure entrances at the high school and Connor Middle School, renovations to the Grand Viking Theater, and improvements to district athletic facilities.

In December 2025, the district put a proposed $69.2 million capital improvements project to a public vote, to be funded primarily through New York State building aid.

== Budget ==
In May 2026, district voters rejected the proposed 2026–27 budget by a vote of 1,352 to 1,280, along with a proposition authorizing vehicle purchases. It was the first time Grand Island voters had defeated a school budget since 2005, and the district was one of five in Western New York whose budgets failed that month. The original proposal would have increased spending by 3 percent to $81.7 million and raised the tax levy by 2.69 percent.

The board subsequently removed $500,000 from the proposal, reducing spending to $81.2 million and the tax levy increase to 1.5 percent. Voters approved the revised budget on June 16, 2026, by a vote of 2,650 to 1,340.

== Superintendents ==
Superintendents of the Grand Island Central School District
Name	Term	Previous position	Departure
Veronica E. Connor	1947–1973	Superintendent-principal, Charlotte Sidway Elementary School	Retired
Oscar J. Pultz	1973–1979		
Robert C. Courtemanche	1979–1986	Superintendent, Central Falls School District	Named superintendent of Middletown Central School District
Robert J. McCarthy (interim)	1986		
Lee J. Cravotta	1986–1991	Principal, Schalmont Middle School	Named superintendent of Oswego City School District
Merton L. Haynes (interim)	1991–1992	Interim superintendent, East Aurora Union Free School District	Resigned
Paul D. Fields	1992–2002	Assistant superintendent, Alden Central School District	Retired
Vincent J. Coppola (interim)	2002	Executive director, Western New York Educational Service Council, University at Buffalo	Returned to previous position
Thomas Ramming	2002–2006	Assistant superintendent for human resources, Williamsville Central School District	Retired
Lawrence J. Zacher (interim)	2006–2007	Interim superintendent, Springville-Griffith Institute Central School District	Named interim superintendent of Owen D. Young Central School
Robert J. Christmann	2007–2013	Superintendent, Newark Central School District	Retired
Paul G. Hashem (interim)	2013	Interim principal, Amsdell Heights Middle School	Named interim superintendent of Frontier Central School District
Teresa M. Lawrence	2013–2016	Assistant superintendent for curriculum and instruction, Clarence Central School District	Contract not renewed
Brian Graham	2016–present		

== Schools ==
Schools in the Grand Island Central School District
School	Grades	Opened
Grand Island Senior High School	9–12	1963
Veronica E. Connor Middle School	6–8	1969
Huth Road School	2–5	1958
Kaegebein School	2–5	1953
Charlotte Sidway School	K–1	1937
