= Holy Angels Church (Buffalo, New York) =

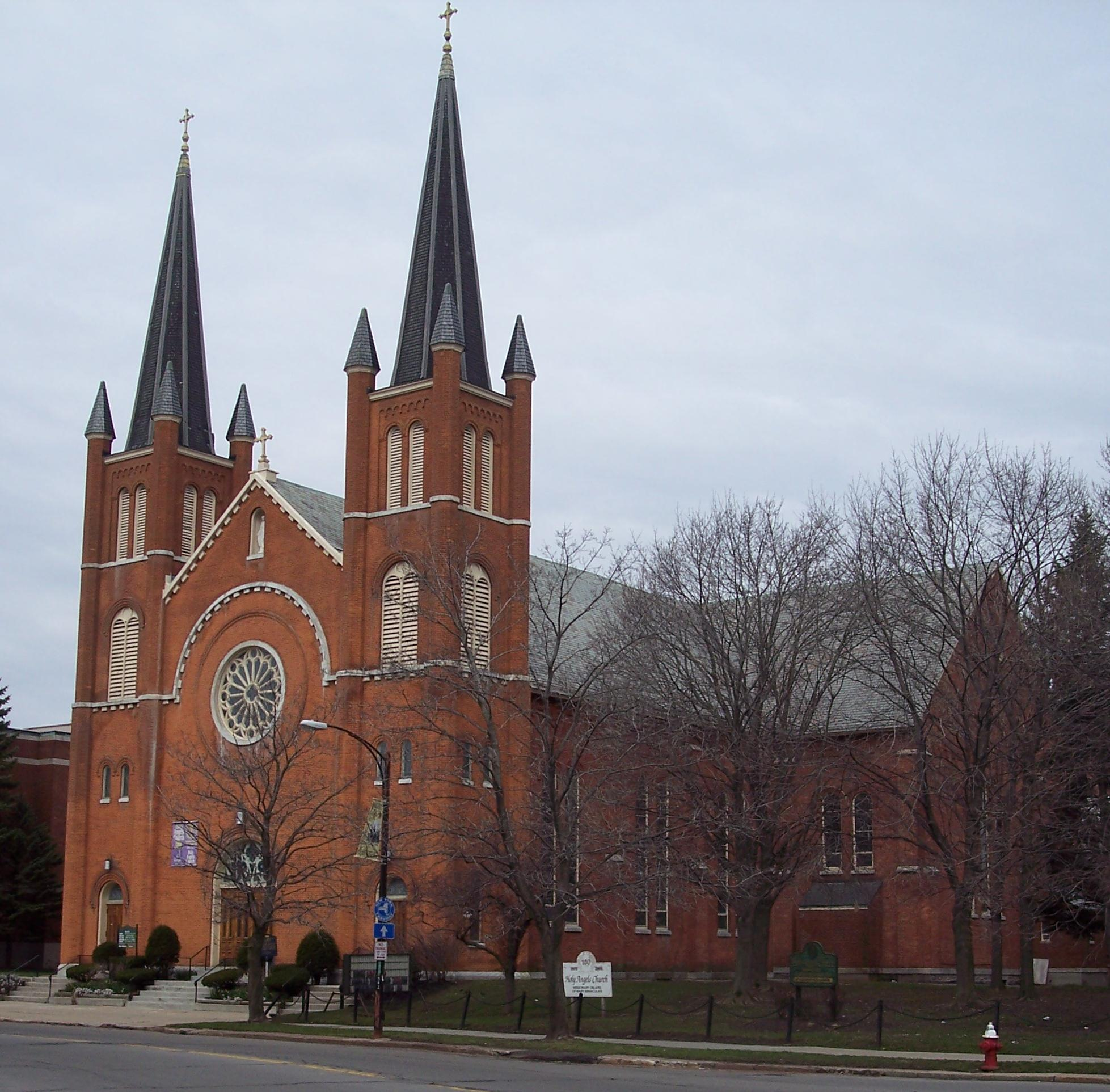
- Holy Angels Church
- 42°54′9.6″N 78°53′22.6″W
- Location: 348 Porter Avenue; Buffalo, New York
- Country: United States

History
- Status: Parish church
- Founded: August 21, 1851
- Founder: John Timon
- Dedicated: 1859

Architecture
- Functional status: Active
- Style: French Romanesque Revival
- Completed: 1875

Holy Angels Church is located in the lower west side of Buffalo, New York, adjacent to D'Youville College. The parish has been served by the Oblates of Mary Immaculate from 1851-2020. In October 2020, D'Youville College purchased the Holy Angels Church, Rectory, and Convent.

== History ==
At the request of Bishop John Timon, who had recently organized the Diocese of Buffalo, missionaries from the Oblates of Mary Immaculate arrived in 1851 to establish a seminary and college at the site of today's St. Joseph Cathedral rectory on Franklin Street.

It quickly became clear a larger facility was needed. The site of the present-day Holy Angels Church was purchased in 1852, where two abandoned buildings (formerly the county poorhouse and insane asylum) were converted into a college and chapel.

In 1856, construction began on a permanent house of worship, which was dedicated by Bishop Timon in 1859, although it was incomplete. In 1874 work was started on the transept, sanctuary and choir, completing the building's modern appearance a year later.

Renovations to the interior in 1898 added marble side altars, a marble mosaic floor in the sanctuary, and hand-carved Stations of the Cross. Further, two Tiffany stained glass windows were installed by the main altar. These windows were displayed at the Pan-American Exposition in 1901.

Between 1959 and 1962, the church enjoyed its largest membership, with over 2,400 families registered. This was followed by a decline in membership as families moved to the suburbs.

In 1986, the church was extensively restored, and rededicated in 1987.

In 2020, Holy Angels Church was decommissioned and sold to D'Youville College.

== Gallery ==
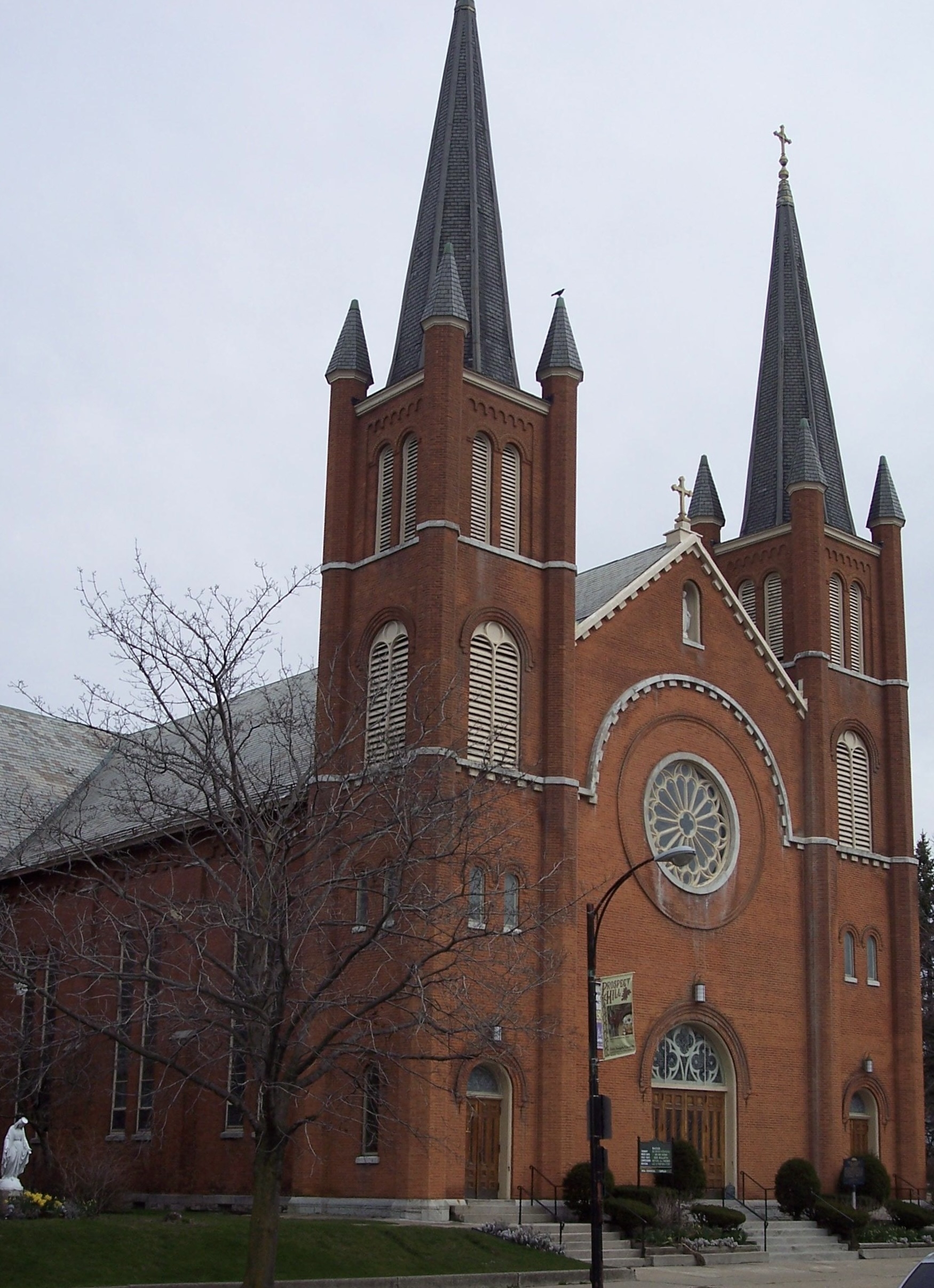
Front outside View

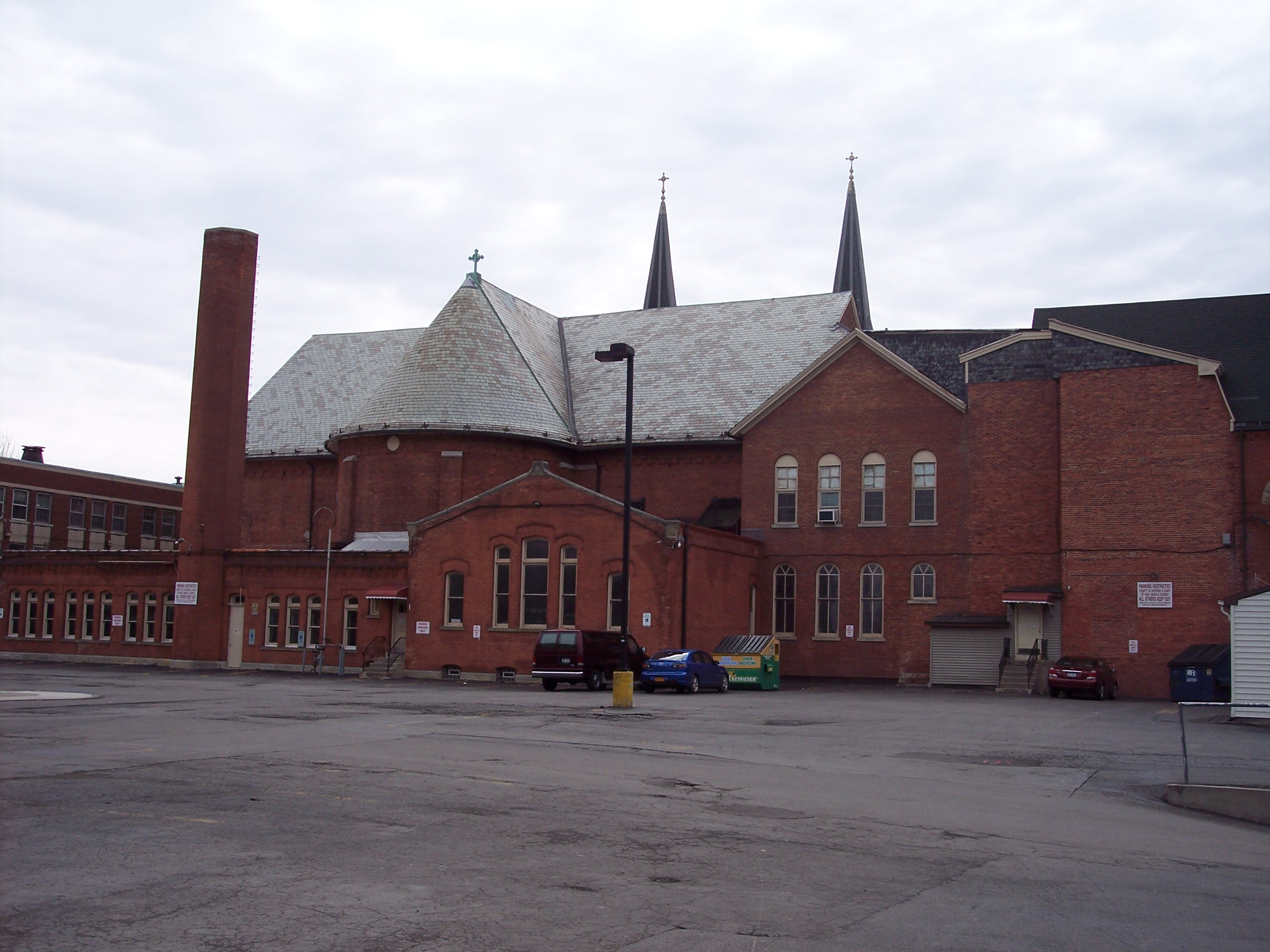
Rear of the church

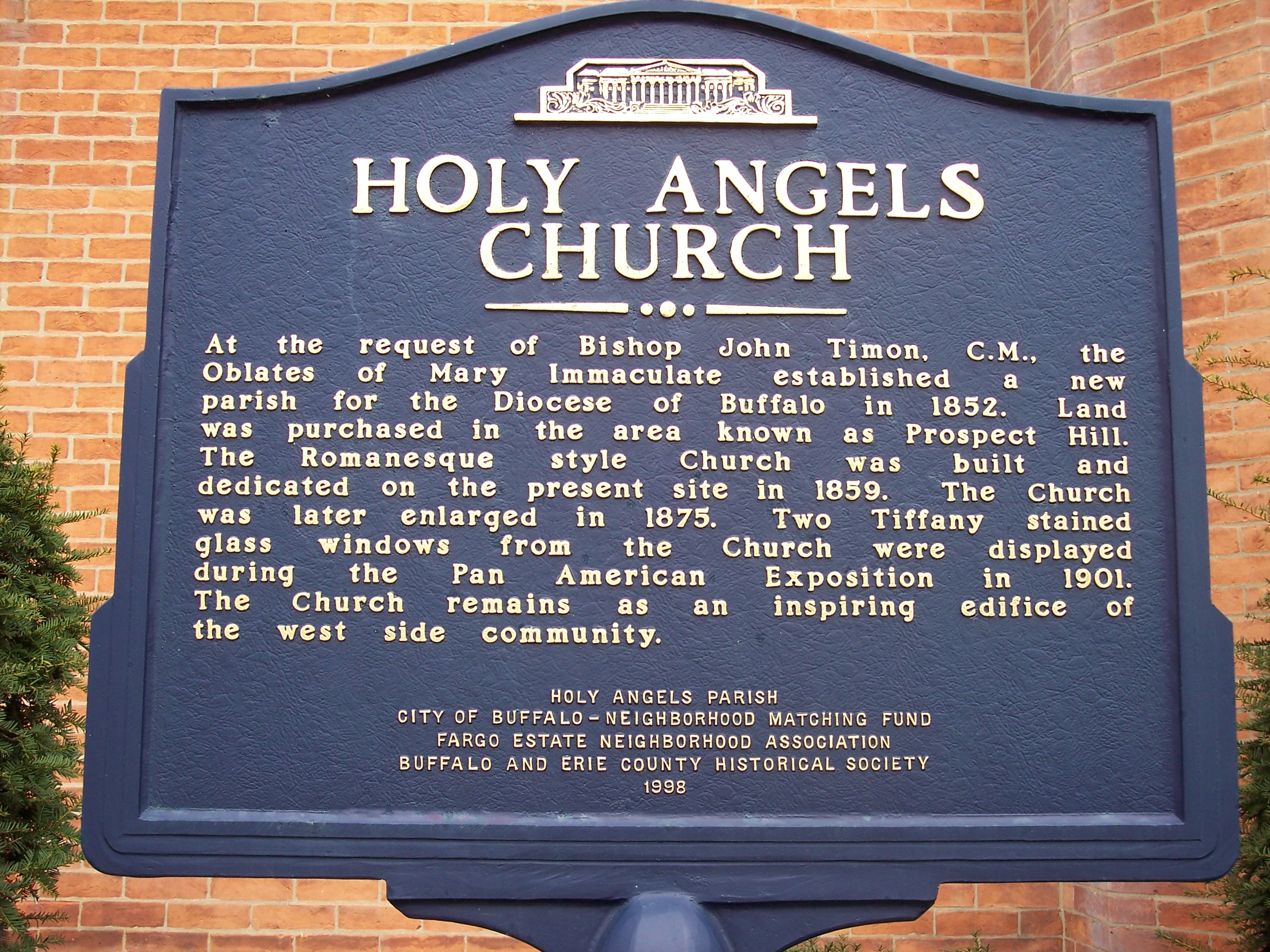
Plaque outside the church

== See also ==
- Holy Angels Academy (Buffalo, New York)
- D'Youville College
