= Cyrus Kinne Porter =

American architect

- Born: August 27, 1828; Cicero, New York
- Died: January 30, 1910 (aged 82); Ransomville, New York
- Occupation: Architect
- Spouses: Edna Marie Smith (m. 1854; died 1857): Emeline Rice
- Children: 5
- Parent(s): Welcome Porter; Rachel Kinne
- Practice: Porter & Turner (1855-1856); Wilcox & Porter (1865-1874); Porter & Watkins (1874); Porter & Percival (1880-1883); Porter & Son (1888-1910)

Cyrus Kinne Porter (August 27, 1828 – January 30, 1910) was a prominent architect in Buffalo, New York, during the Victorian era, known for the many churches he designed throughout the city of Buffalo.

== Early life ==
Porter was born in Cicero, New York, on August 27, 1828, to Welcome Porter (1805–1845) and Rachel Kinne. He was orphaned at age 17 when he learned the trade of a joiner. He studied architectural drawing, and became an accomplished draftsman.

Porter was a descendant of Robert Porter, who emigrated from England to the American Colonies and became one of the founders of Farmington, Connecticut, where he settled in 1640. Robert's son, Thomas, was the father of Nathaniel, who was the father of David, who purchased a farm in Cicero, NY, about 1812 or 1813, and resided there till his death. Cyrus Porter's grandfather, David, who married Esther, the daughter of Gideon and Hannah (née Messenger) Burr, were the parents of Cyrus' father, Welcome Porter.

== Career ==
In 1853, he became employed as a draftsman for the Chicago Water Works, then from 1855 to 1856 ran an architectural office in Brantford, Ontario, with partner John Turner (1807–1887). In 1865, Porter moved to Buffalo, entering into partnership with H. M. Wilcox as Wilcox & Porter, and designing buildings including the Ovid Insane Asylum and Normal schools at Fredonia, Cortland, and Potsdam. He subsequently designed a large number of buildings in Buffalo under various partnerships including Porter and Watkins (1874), Porter and Percival (1880–1883), and Porter and Son (1888–1910).

=== Prominent works ===
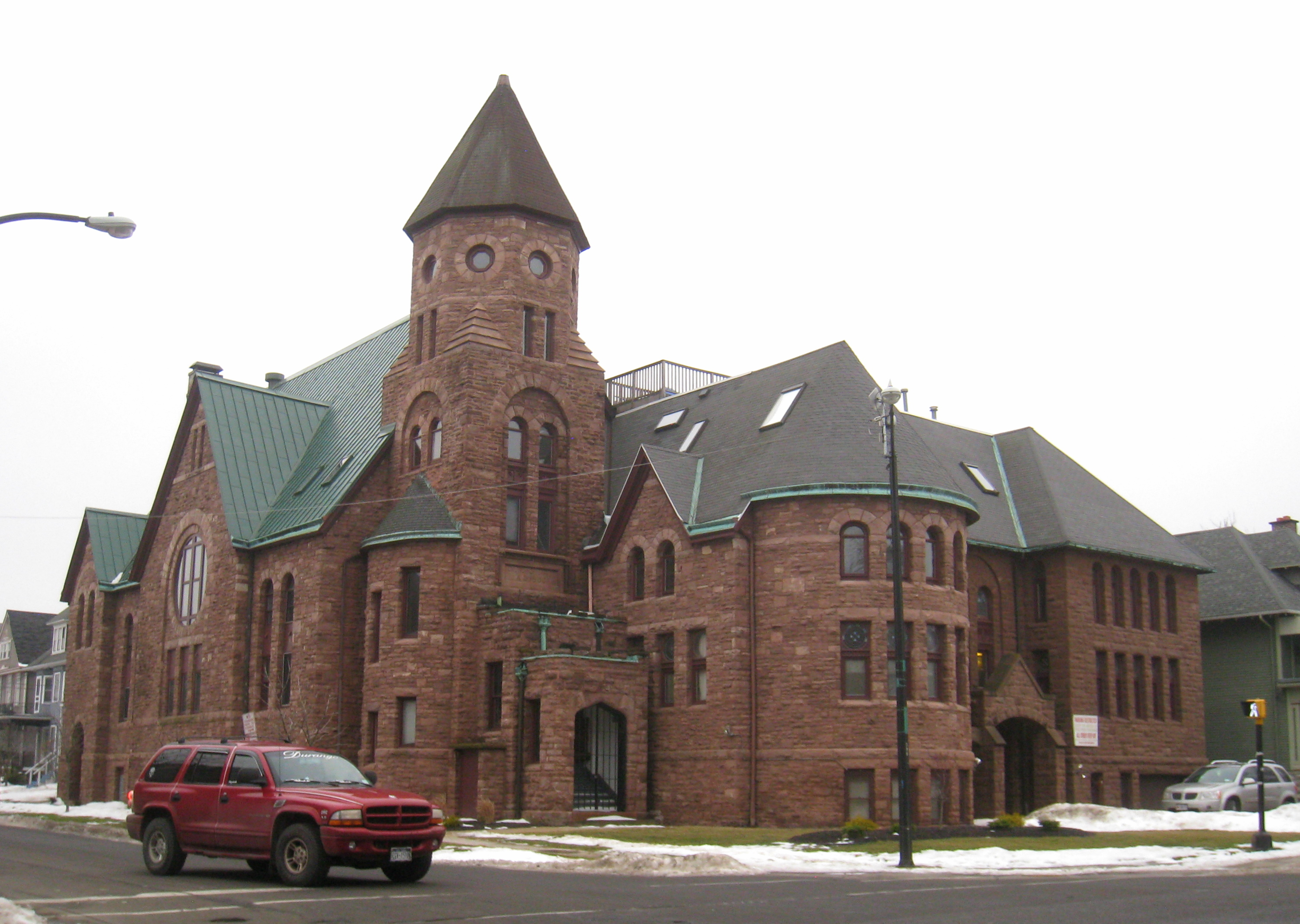
Disciples of Christ Church / Richmond Avenue Church of Christ (1886)

Some of his best-known works in Buffalo are:

- The American Block
- The Coal and Iron Exchange (before 1883, now demolished)
- The Buffalo Cyclorama Building (1888)
- The Builders' Exchange
- Trinity Church on Delaware Avenue (1886)
- The Church of the Holy Name (1904)
- St. Patrick's Church
- The Disciples of Christ Church
- Richmond Avenue Church of Christ (1886)
- The William Hengerer Company store (1904 with 2 story addition in 1910)

== Personal life ==
On December 4, 1854, Porter married Edna Marie Smith (d. 1857), the daughter of Stafford and Lucy Smith of Waterford, Ontario. Before her early death, they had one child, a son who died in infancy. Porter married for the second time, to Emeline Rice, the daughter of Jesse and Ellen (née Holmes) Rice of Townsend, Ontario. Together, they had two sons and three daughters, including:

- Edna M. Porter (1860- )
- Jesse R. Porter (1861-1929)
- Hermione T. Porter
- Minnie K. Porter.
- Cyrus K. Porter Jr. (b. 1873), also an architect who married Belle T. Weekes, daughter of Robert Stratton Weekes, of New York City, in 1904.

Two of his children went on to become architects with his son, Jesse, becoming his partner. Jesse designed the Plymouth Avenue Methodist Church his daughter Edna studied architecture at Cornell University, having graduated from Buffalo High School in 1881.
