= Holy Angels Catholic Church (Sandusky, Ohio) =

Historic church in Ohio, United States

- Holy Angels Church
- U.S. National Register of Historic Places
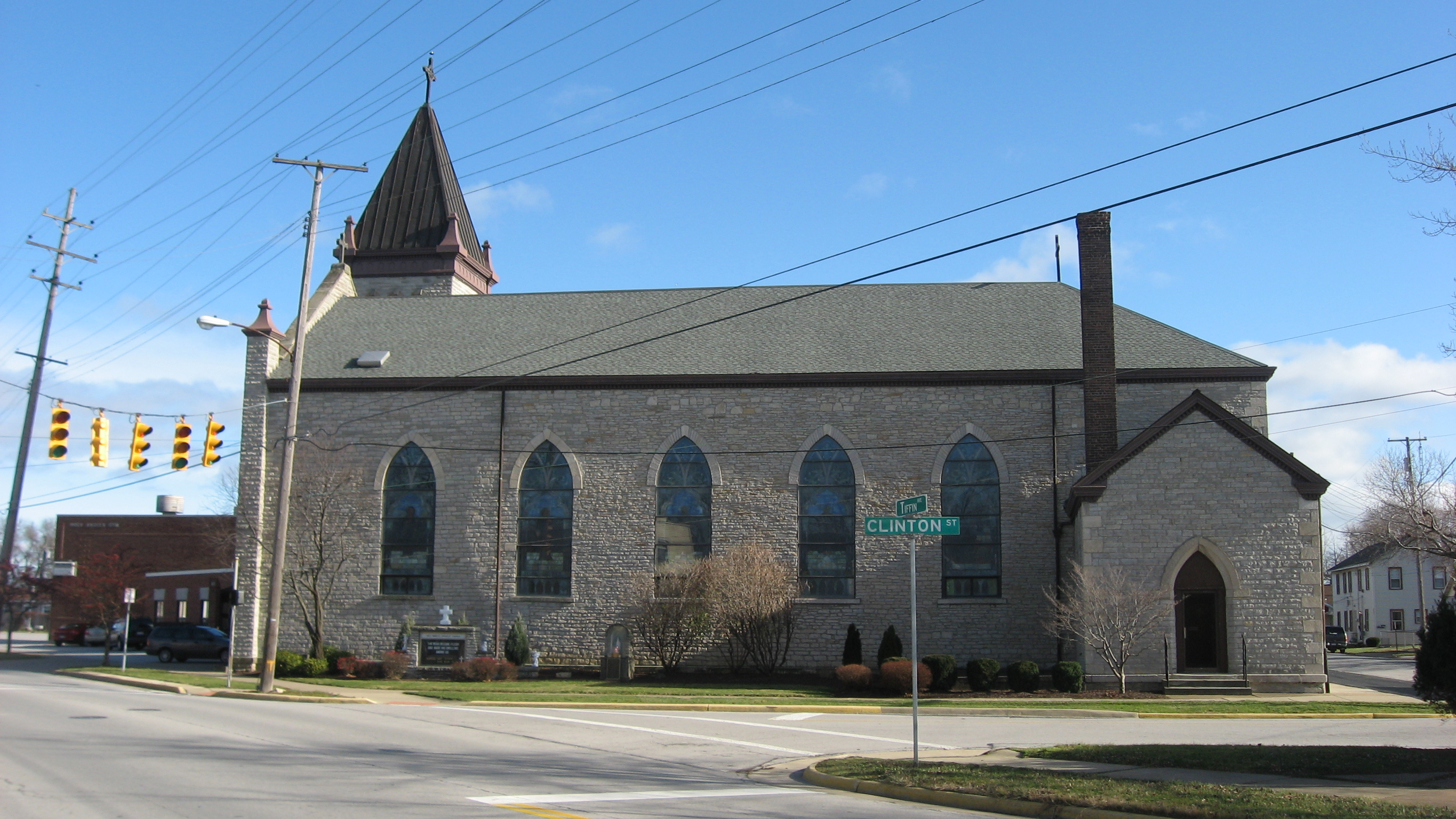
- Holy Angels Catholic Church (Sandusky, Ohio)

- Location within Ohio Location within the United States
- Location: W. Jefferson St. at Tiffin Ave. and Clinton St., Sandusky, Ohio
- Coordinates: 41°26′57″N 82°43′23″W
- Area: less than one acre
- Built: 1841
- Built by: Cassidy, Robert
- Architectural style: Gothic Revival
- MPS: Sandusky MRA
- NRHP reference No.: 82001410
- Added to NRHP: October 20, 1982

Holy Angels Church is the oldest extant church building in the Roman Catholic Diocese of Toledo and Erie County, Ohio. The stone Gothic Revival style church is located on West Jefferson Street at Tiffin Avenue and Clinton Street in Sandusky, Ohio.

It was built in 1841 and added to the National Register of Historic Places in 1982.

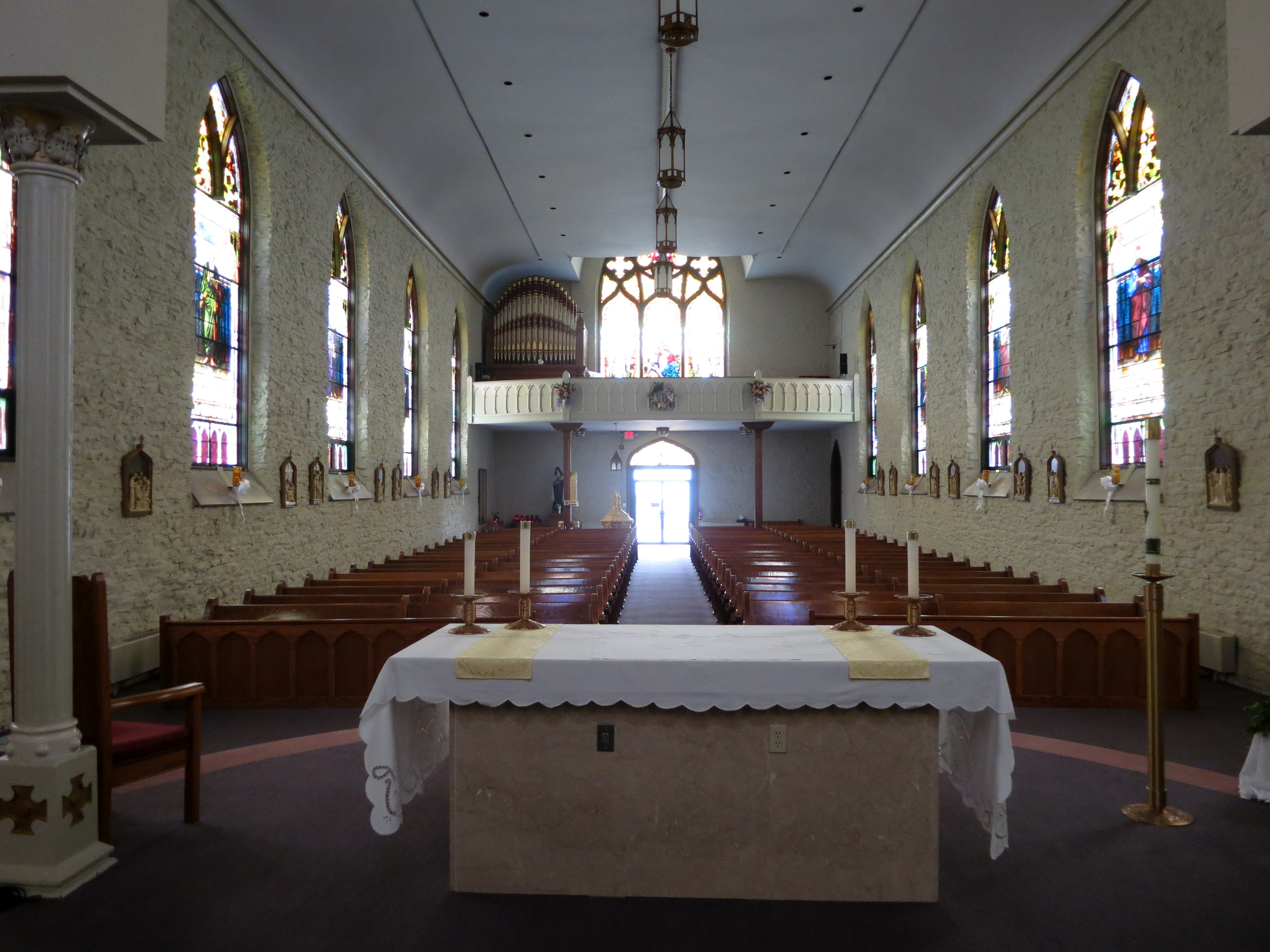
Interior
