= Kenmore, New York =

- Village
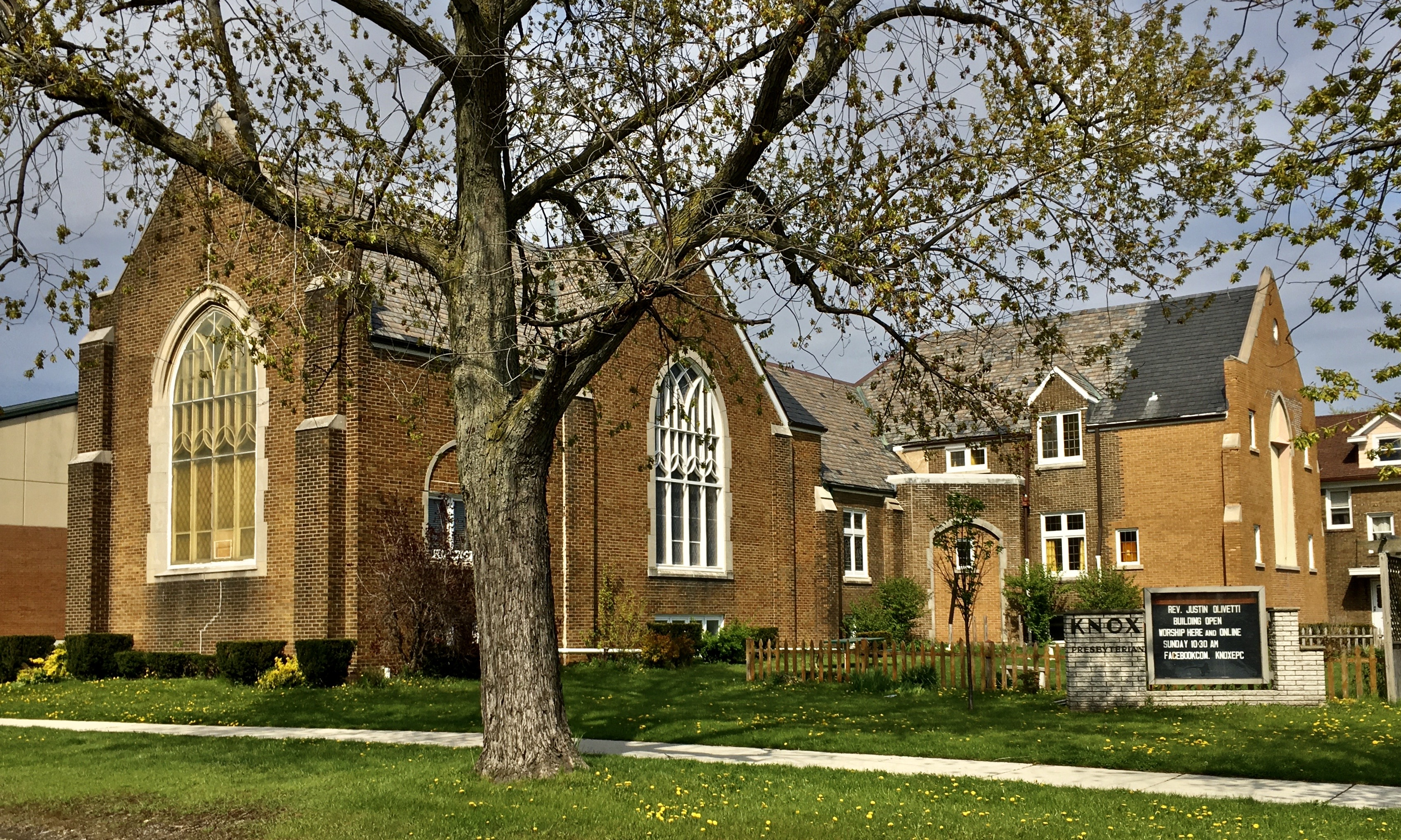
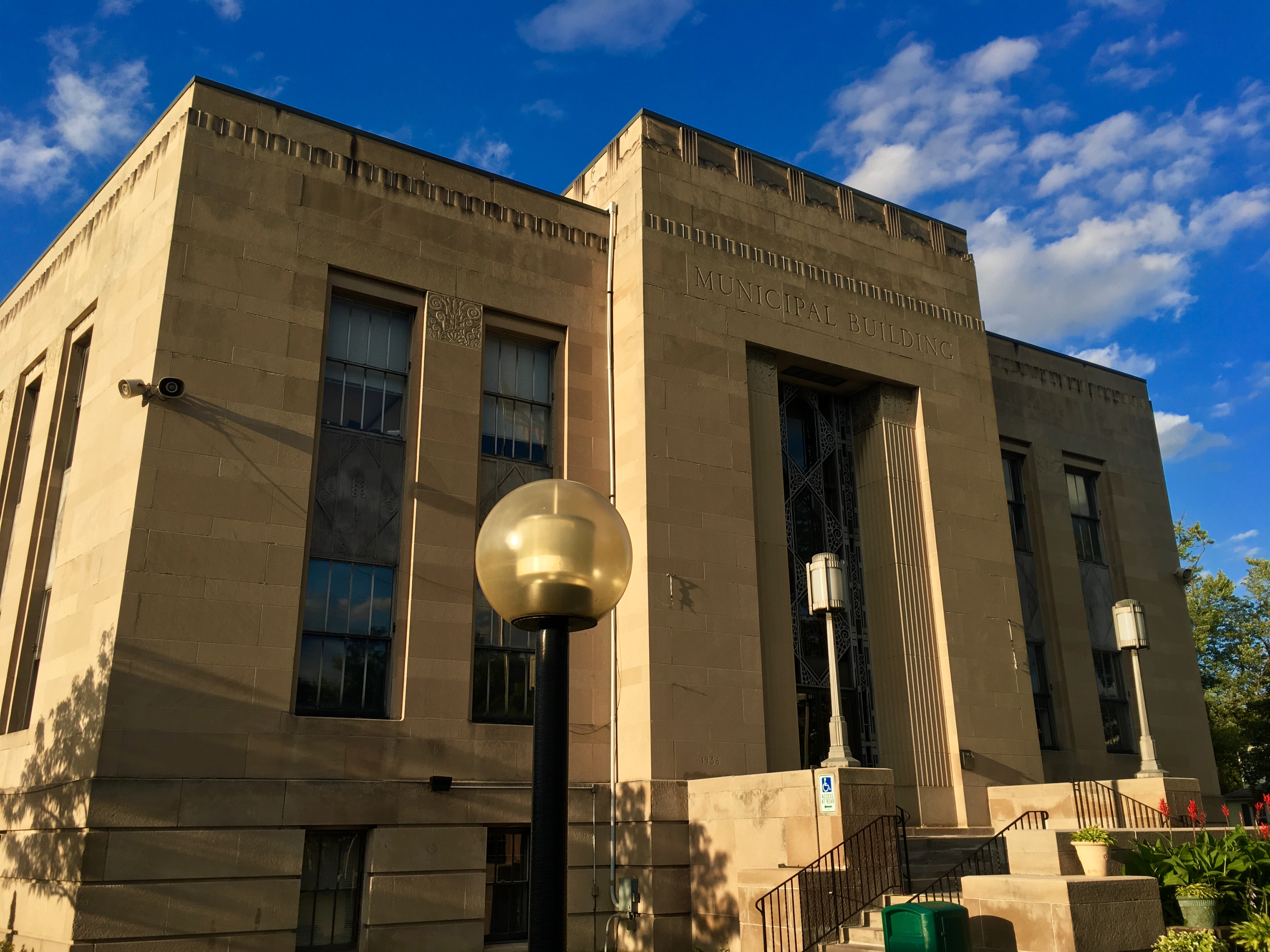
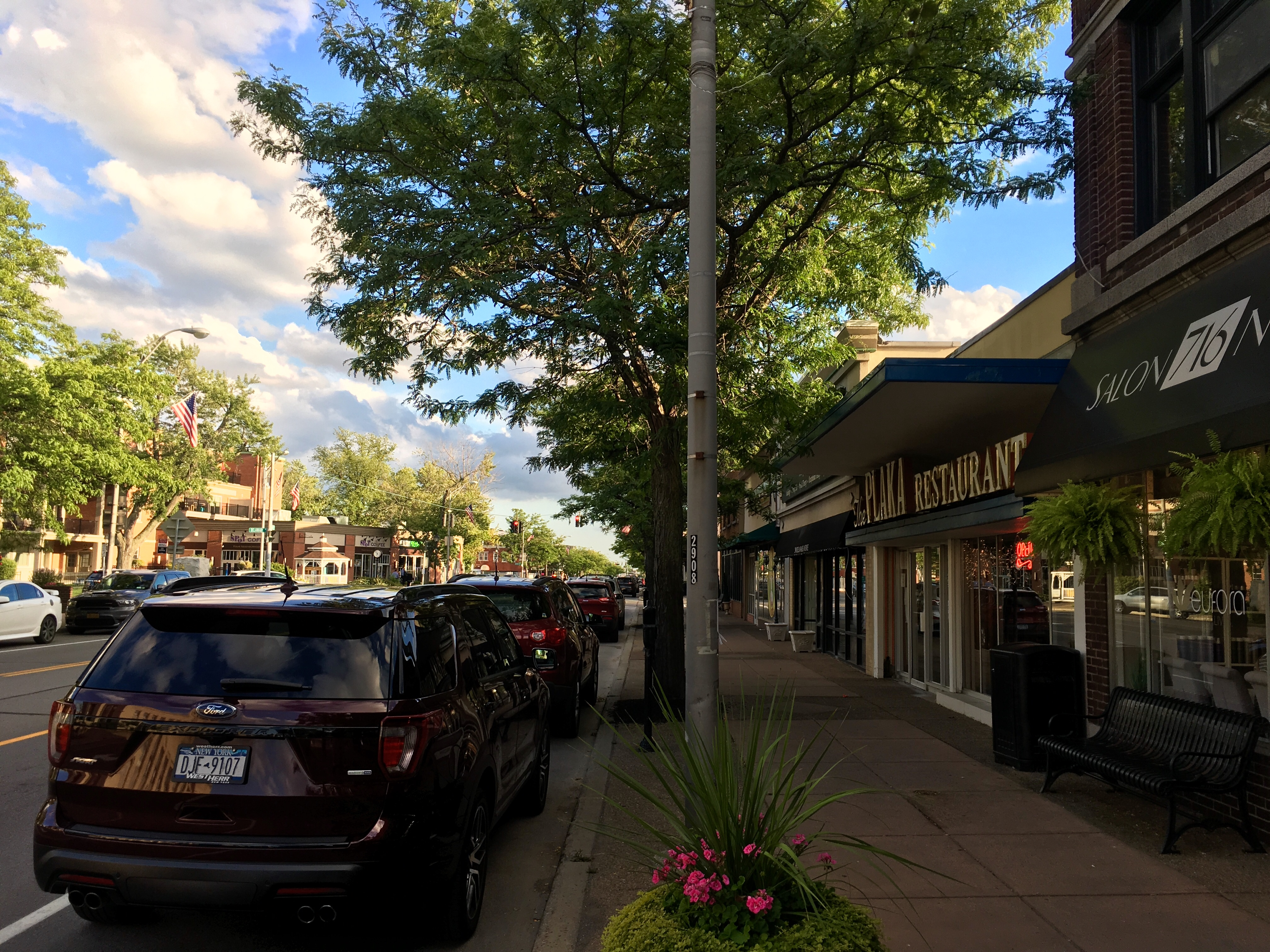
- Knox Evangelical Presbyterian Church, Tonawanda Municipal Building and downtown
- Nicknames: Buffalo's first suburb; Ken-Ton(with Tonawanda)
- Location in Erie County and New York
- Coordinates: 42°57′54″N 78°52′18″W
- Country: United States
- State: New York
- County: Erie
- Town: Tonawanda

Government
  - Mayor: Patrick Mang
  - Trustees: Members' list: • Paul P. Catalano, Deputy; • Joseph M. DeCecco; • Andrea Czopp; • Louis J. Cercone

Area
  - Total: 1.44 sq mi (3.72 km^{2})
  - Land: 1.44 sq mi (3.72 km^{2})
  - Water: 0 sq mi (0.00 km^{2})
- Elevation: 614 ft (187 m)

Population (2020)
  - Total: 15,205
  - Density: 10,589.9/sq mi (4,088.77/km^{2})
- Time zone: UTC−5 (Eastern (EST))
  - Summer (DST): UTC−4 (EDT)
- ZIP Code: 14217
- Area code: 716
- FIPS code: 36-39232
- GNIS feature ID: 0954497
- Website: www.villageofkenmore.org

Kenmore is a village in Erie County, New York, United States. The population was 15,205 at the 2020 census. It is part of the Buffalo-Niagara Falls metropolitan area.

Kenmore is in the south part of the town of Tonawanda, and together with the town it is often referred to as "Ken-Ton". It is bordered to the south by the city of Buffalo. The village is in the northwest part of Erie County.

The village has received accolades: In 2009, the American Planning Association named Kenmore "One of the Top 10 Great Neighborhoods" in the United States. The village is also one of the country's 100 most densely populated incorporated places.

== History ==
The village of Kenmore was incorporated in 1899 from part of the town of Tonawanda. It is known as "Buffalo's First Suburb".

Louis Eberhardt, known as the "father of Kenmore", opposed naming the village "Eberhardt" after himself. He was responsible for buying farmland and subdividing the property into a suburban development. The building which is portrayed on the village logo is the Eberhardt Mansion, located at the corner of Delaware Avenue and Kenmore Avenue. It was listed on the National Register of Historic Places in 1983. The Kenmore Village Hall was listed in 2013 as the Tonawanda Municipal Building.

== Geography ==
Kenmore is located at 42°57′54″N 78°52′18″W (42.964907, -78.871679).

According to the United States Census Bureau, the village has a total area of 1.4 square miles (3.6 km^{2}), all land.

=== Adjacent cities and towns ===
- Town of Tonawanda - west, north, east
- Buffalo - south

=== Major highways ===
- New York State Route 265 (Military Rd.), north–south roadway that provides the west village line.
- New York State Route 384 (Delaware Ave.), north–south roadway through the village from Tonawanda south into Buffalo.
- Elmwood Avenue (Erie CR 119), important north–south roadway through the village
- Kenmore Avenue (Erie CR 307), east–west roadway that forms the south village line.

== Demographics ==
Historical population
Census	Pop.	Note	%±
1900	318		—
1910	1,020		220.8%
1920	3,160		209.8%
1930	16,482		421.6%
1940	18,612		12.9%
1950	20,066		7.8%
1960	21,261		6.0%
1970	20,980		−1.3%
1980	18,474		−11.9%
1990	17,180		−7.0%
2000	16,426		−4.4%
2010	15,423		−6.1%
2020	15,205		−1.4%
U.S. Decennial Census

=== 2020 census ===
As of the 2020 census, Kenmore had a population of 15,205. The median age was 39.9 years. 19.0% of residents were under the age of 18 and 18.5% of residents were 65 years of age or older. For every 100 females there were 90.4 males, and for every 100 females age 18 and over there were 87.9 males age 18 and over.

100.0% of residents lived in urban areas, while 0.0% lived in rural areas.

There were 7,037 households in Kenmore, of which 24.4% had children under the age of 18 living in them. Of all households, 37.6% were married-couple households, 20.3% were households with a male householder and no spouse or partner present, and 33.7% were households with a female householder and no spouse or partner present. About 37.6% of all households were made up of individuals and 14.8% had someone living alone who was 65 years of age or older.

There were 7,447 housing units, of which 5.5% were vacant. The homeowner vacancy rate was 1.3% and the rental vacancy rate was 5.1%.

Racial composition as of the 2020 census
Race	Number	Percent
White	12,809	84.2%
Black or African American	874	5.7%
American Indian and Alaska Native	99	0.7%
Asian	291	1.9%
Native Hawaiian and Other Pacific Islander	1	0.0%
Some other race	201	1.3%
Two or more races	930	6.1%
Hispanic or Latino (of any race)	771	5.1%

=== 2000 census ===
As of the 2000 census, there were 16,426 people, 7,071 households, and 4,235 families residing in the village. The population density was 11,437.2 inhabitants per square mile (4,415.9/km^{2}), one of the densest populations in the United States. There were 7,459 housing units at an average density of 5,193.6 per square mile (2,005.3/km^{2}). The racial makeup of the village was 96.85% White, 0.99% African American, 0.35% Native American, 0.58% Asian, 0.04% Pacific Islander, 0.35% from other races, and 0.83% from two or more races. Hispanic or Latino of any race were 1.30% of the population.

There were 7,071 households, out of which 28.7% had children under the age of 18 living with them, 45.3% were married couples living together, 11.6% had a female householder with no husband present, and 40.1% were non-families. 34.8% of all households were made up of individuals, and 15.6% had someone living alone who was 65 years of age or older. The average household size was 2.31 and the average family size was 3.04.

In the village, the population was spread out, with 23.3% under the age of 18, 7.4% from 18 to 24, 30.5% from 25 to 44, 22.5% from 45 to 64, and 16.4% who were 65 years of age or older. The median age was 38 years. For every 100 females, there were 86.3 males. For every 100 females age 18 and over, there were 81.9 males.

The median income for a household in the village was $42,252, and the median income for a family was $53,155. Males had a median income of $38,371 versus $26,875 for females. The per capita income for the village was $21,695. About 3.5% of families and 5.2% of the population were below the poverty line, including 5.8% of those under age 18 and 4.6% of those age 65 or over.

== Government ==
The village government consists of a mayor and four trustees, each elected to a four-year term. The current mayor is Patrick Mang.

== Education ==
Kenmore located in Kenmore-Tonawanda Union Free School District.

== Notable people ==
- Adrian Adonis, pro wrestler
- Zach Anner, stand-up comedian
- Wolf Blitzer, journalist and news anchor
- Ronald C. Brock, adjutant general of New York
- Bob Cameron, racing driver
- Jonah Heim, American professional baseball catcher for the Texas Rangers
- Green Jellÿ, punk band
- Rusty Jeffers, professional bodybuilder
- Gerda Weissmann Klein, Holocaust historian and recipient of the Medal of Freedom
- Beth Krom, former mayor of Irvine, California
- Jill Krowinski, Speaker of the Vermont House of Representatives since 2021
- Chris Lee, former US congressman
- John Massé, animator
- Chuck McCoy, radio personality, comedian, YouTube creator
- Dan McFall, retired NHL player
- Bernard Joseph McLaughlin, Roman Catholic bishop
- James McLernon, retired automobile company executive
- Jerry Ross, painter
- Vesta M. Roy, former acting governor of New Hampshire
- Robin Schimminger, former New York state assemblyman
