= Eden =

Eden (/ˈiːdən/ EE-dən) most often refers to:

- Garden of Eden, the "garden of God" described in the Book of Genesis

Eden (/ˈiːdən/ EE-dən) may also refer to:

== Places and jurisdictions ==
=== Australia ===
- Eden, New South Wales
  - Electoral district of Eden, an electoral district in New South Wales

=== New Zealand ===
- Eden (New Zealand electorate), a former New Zealand Parliamentary electorate
- Maungawhau / Mount Eden, a dormant volcano

=== United Kingdom ===
- Eden, County Antrim, a townland in Northern Ireland
- Eden, three townlands in County Londonderry, Northern Ireland:
  - Eden, Dungiven parish
  - Eden, Learmount parish (County Londonderry portion)
  - Eden, Tamlaght O'Crilly parish
- Eden, a townland in County Tyrone, Northern Ireland
- Eden District, a former local government district in Cumbria, England
- River Eden, Cumbria, England
- River Eden, Kent, England
- River Eden, Fife, Scotland
- Eden Water, a tributary of the River Tweed, Scotland
- Afon Eden, Gwynedd, Wales, a river

=== United States ===
- Eden, Arizona
- Eden, Idaho
- Eden, Peoria County, Illinois
- Eden, Randolph County, Illinois
- Eden, Indiana
- Eden, Kansas
- Eden, Kentucky
- Eden (Gardner, Louisiana), a historic place
- Eden, Maryland
- Eden, Minnesota
- Eden, Mississippi
- Eden, New York, a town
  - Eden (CDP), New York, a census-designated place within the town
- Eden, North Carolina
- Eden, South Dakota
- Eden, Texas
- Eden, Utah
- Eden, Vermont
- Eden, Ohio County, West Virginia, an unincorporated community
- Eden, Upshur County, West Virginia, an unincorporated community
- Eden, Wisconsin, a village
- Eden (town), Fond du Lac County, Wisconsin, a town
- Eden, Iowa County, Wisconsin, a town
- Eden, Wyoming
- Eden Township (disambiguation)

=== Elsewhere ===
- Eden Rocks, Antarctica
- Eden, Ontario, Canada
- Eden River (Dominica)
- Camp Eden, Iraq
- Eden District Municipality, South Africa

== People ==
- Eden (given name), including a list of people
- Eden (surname), a list of people

== Arts, entertainment, and media ==
=== Fictional entities ===
- Eden (Aladdin), in Disney's Aladdin films
- Eden Lord, in the television series Nip/Tuck
- Eden Worlds, fictional planets in Dimension X in the Teenage Mutant Ninja Turtles franchise
- Martin Eden, in the novel Martin Eden by Jack London
- Eden McCain, a character in the American television series Heroes

=== Films ===
- Eden (2001 film), a war drama by Amos Gitai
- Eden (2006 film), a German romance
- Eden (2012 film), a U.S. human trafficking drama by Megan Griffiths
- Eden (2014 film), French drama by Mia Hansen-Løve
- Eden (2015 film), a U.S. survival drama
- Eden (2019 film), an Icelandic drama
- Eden (2024 film), a survival thriller by Ron Howard

=== Literature ===
- Eden (Fox novel), 2014, by Candice Fox
- Eden (Lem novel), a 1959 science fiction book by Stanisław Lem
- Eden, a 2007 Sandra Mahoney novel by Dorothy Johnston
- Eden: It's an Endless World!, a 1997 manga series by Hiroki Endo
- Eden (Eugene O'Brien play), 2001
- Eden (Steve Carter play), 1976
- Eden*, a 2009 visual novel by Minori

=== Publications ===
- EDEN (magazine), an online manga magazine
- Eden (newspaper), an English-language newspaper in Cameroon

=== Music ===
==== Performers ====
- Eden (Australian band), a dark wave band
- Eden (Israeli band), a vocal group
- Eden (South African band), a boy band
- Eden (Irish musician) (born 1995), Irish singer-songwriter and music producer, stylized as EDEN
- Eden (Korean musician) (born 1988), Korean singer-songwriter and music producer
- eden ahbez, stage name of American musician George Alexander Aberle (1908–1995)
- Eden Alene (born 2000), Israeli singer known mononymously as Eden
- Eden Kane, stage name of English singer Richard Sarstedt (born 1940)
- Eden xo, stage name of American pop singer-songwriter Eden Wilson (born 1989)
- Fiona Russell Powell (born 1962), British journalist and member of the 1980s pop group ABC, known by the stage name "Eden"

==== Albums ====
- Eden (Cupcakke album), 2018
- Eden (Everything but the Girl album), 1984
- Eden (Faun album), 2011
- Eden (Luna Sea album), 1993
- Eden (Sarah Brightman album), 1998
- Eden, by Akino Arai, 2004
- Eden, by Étienne Daho, 1996
- Eden, by Vektroid recording as New Dreams Ltd., 2016

==== Songs ====
- "Eden" (Hooverphonic song), 1998; covered by Sarah Brightman, 1998
- "Eden" (Nana Mizuki song), 2015
- "Eden", by Au5, 2019
- "Eden", by Invent Animate from Greyview, 2020
- "Eden", by Iron & Wine from Archive Series Volume No. 1, 2015
- "Eden", by Phil Wickham from Heaven & Earth, 2009
- "Eden", by Primal Fear from Domination, 2025
- "Eden", by Talk Talk from Spirit of Eden, 1988
- "Eden", by Tesseract from One, 2011

==== Other uses in music ====
- Eden Festival, a Scottish music festival

=== Television ===
- U&Eden, UK and Ireland formerly Eden
- Eden (New Zealand TV channel), New Zealand
- Eden TV, Italy
- Eden (1993 TV series), with Barbara Alyn Woods
- Eden (2002 TV series), a British reality series
- Eden (2016 TV series), a British reality series
- Eden (2021 TV series), a Netflix original anime series
- Eden (Australian TV series), a 2021 drama series

== Brands, enterprises, and organizations ==
- Eden (cheese), a Philippine brand of processed cheese
- Eden Electronics, a bass amplification company
- Eden Foods Inc., an independent American organic food producer
- Eden Games, a video game developer
- Eden Studios (recording facility), a recording studio
- European Destinations of Excellence, a European organization promoting tourism
- European Distance and E-learning Network, an international educational organization

== Schools ==
- Eden Theological Seminary, a Missouri-based seminary
- Eden High School, St. Catharines, Ontario, Canada
- Eden High School (Texas), US

== Science and technology ==
- Eden growth model, a bacterial growth concept
- MBDB, street name Eden, a psychedelic drug
- VIA Eden, a computer processor family

== Sports ==
- Eden AFC, a New Zealand association football club, 1947–1997, subsumed by Three Kings United
- Eden Gardens, a stadium in Kolkata, India
- Eden Park, a stadium in Auckland, New Zealand
- Eden Arena, a stadium in Prague-Vršovice, Czech Republic

== Other uses ==
- Eden (1826 ship), a UK merchant ship
- Eden, High Wycombe, a shopping centre in Buckinghamshire, England
- Eden baronets, two extant titles
- Eden Project, a visitor attraction in Cornwall, England
- Education Data Exchange Network, a system of information transfer among US educational agencies

== See also ==
- Aden (disambiguation)
- Adan (disambiguation)
- East of Eden (disambiguation)
- Eden Valley (disambiguation)
- Garden of Eden (disambiguation)
- EDUN, a brand of clothing
