= Edon =

Edon may refer to:

== People ==
- Aissa Edon (born 1981), Malian activist
- Edon Amaral do Neto (born 1967), Brazilian footballer
- Edon Hasani (born 1992), Albanian football player
- Edon Júnior Viegas Amaral (born 1994), Portuguese footballer
- Edon Zhegrova (born 1999), German-born Kosovan footballer

== Places ==
- Édon, France
- Edon, Ohio, United States
- Edon, Vladimir Oblast, Russia

== Other ==
- EDON, or United Democratic Youth Organisation (Cyprus)
- Shakaar Edon, Star Trek character

== See also ==
- Eden (disambiguation)
