= Smashing Anthems =

Studio album by Nana Mizuki
- Released: November 11, 2015
- Recorded: 2014–2015
- Genre: J-pop, pop rock
- Length: 65:00 (CD)
- Label: King Records

Nana Mizuki chronology
Supernal Liberty (2014)	Smashing Anthems (2015)	Neogene Creation (2016)

Regular Edition

Singles from Smashing Anthems
- 1. "Kindan no Resistance" Released: October 15, 2014; 2. "Eden" Released: January 14, 2015; 3. "Angel Blossom" Released: April 22, 2015; 4. "Exterminate" Released: September 22, 2015

Smashing Anthems is the eleventh studio album released by Japanese voice actress and pop singer Nana Mizuki on November 11, 2015. Recording sessions for the album took place from 2014 to 2015. It was released in three editions: a CD only edition, a limited CD+DVD edition and a limited CD+BD edition.

== Track listing ==
No.	Title	Lyrics	Music	Length
1.	"Glorious Break"	Shihori	Noriyasu Agematsu, Hitoshi Fujima (Elements Garden)	5:16
2.	"Never Let Go"	Goro Matsui	Keisuke Yamazaki	4:10
3.	"SUPER☆MAN"	Kon-K	Kon-K, Jun Suyama	3:51
4.	"Angel Blossom"	Nana Mizuki	Hajime Mitsumasu, EFFY	4:03
5.	"Bracelet"	Shoko Fujibayashi	Hiroyuki Ito, Kengo Minamida	4:51
6.	"Lazy Syndrome"	Takumi Yoshida (phatmans after school)	Takumi Yoshida, Hitoshi Fujima	3:57
7.	"Koiuta."	Shihori	Yu Nakano, Ryosuke Nakanishi	4:10
8.	"Kindan no Resistance" (Extended Mix)	Nana Mizuki	Yusuke Kato	4:59
9.	"The NEW STAR"	Kanao Itabashi	Atsushi Kimura	3:52
10.	"Clutch !!"	Tomotaka	Hajime Mitsumasa	4:11
11.	"Maria of passion"	Nana Mizuki	Yusuke Kato	3:42
12.	"Ego Ideal"	Nana Mizuki	Nana Mizuki, Hitoshi Fujima	4:11
13.	"Eden"	Nana Mizuki	Shinchi Fujimori (Aobuzu), Hitoshi Fujima	4:45
14.	"Ambivalence"	Ryo Nakamura	Ryo Nakamura, Tomo Nakamura	4:36
15.	"Exterminate"	Nana Mizuki	Noriyasu Agematsu, Hitoshi Fujima	4:02
