= Jew's harp music =

Music written for Jew's harp

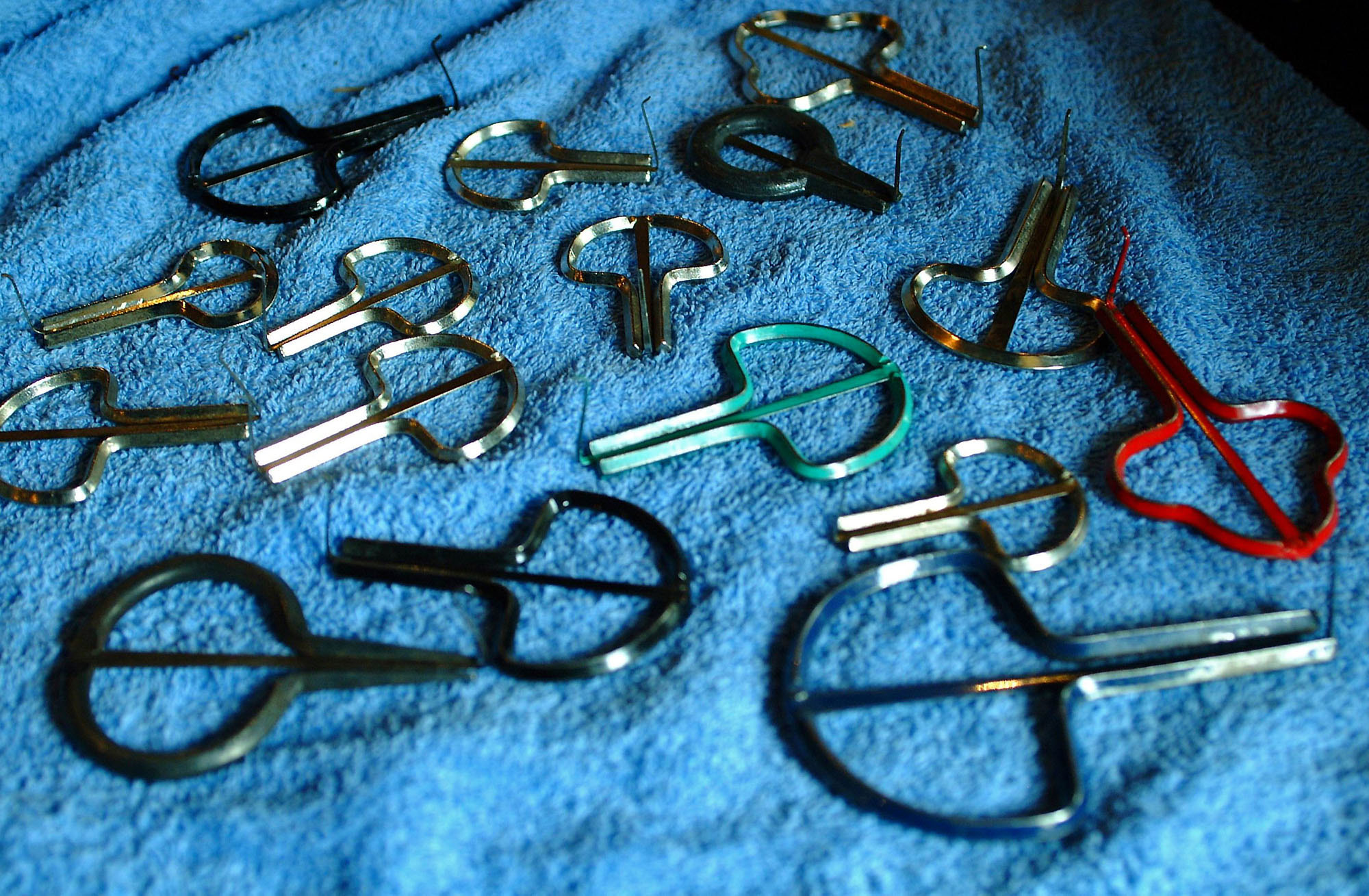
Variety of Western Jew's harps

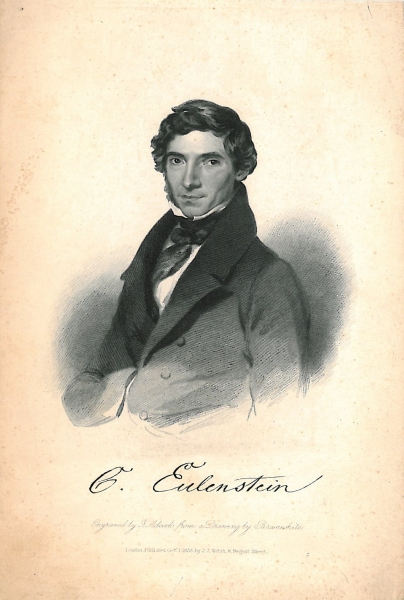
Karl Eulenstein, famed German Maultrommelspieler

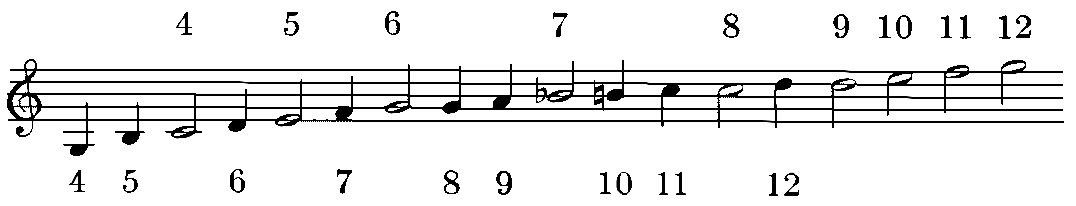
the range of a tenor Jew's harp

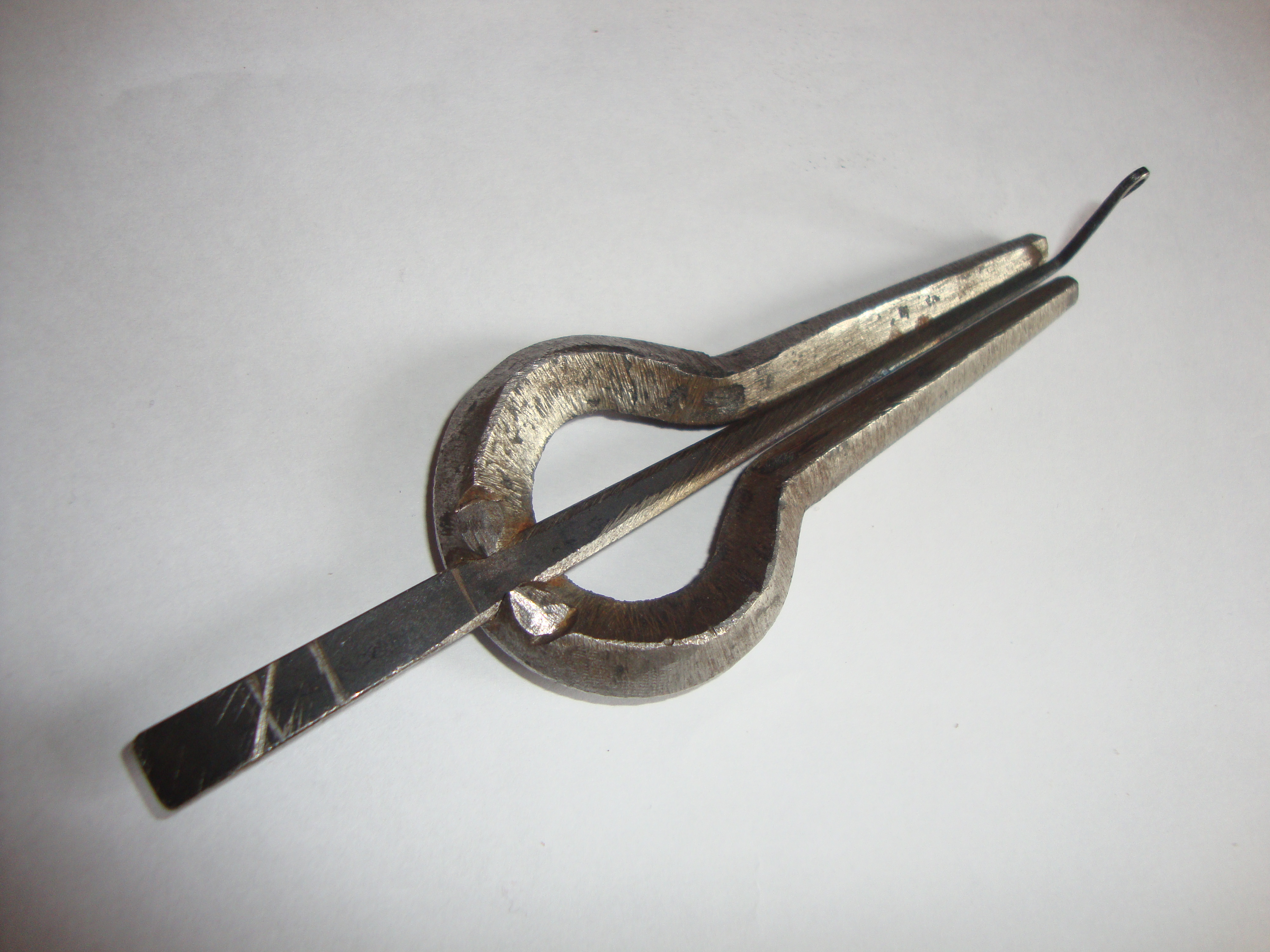
Morsing

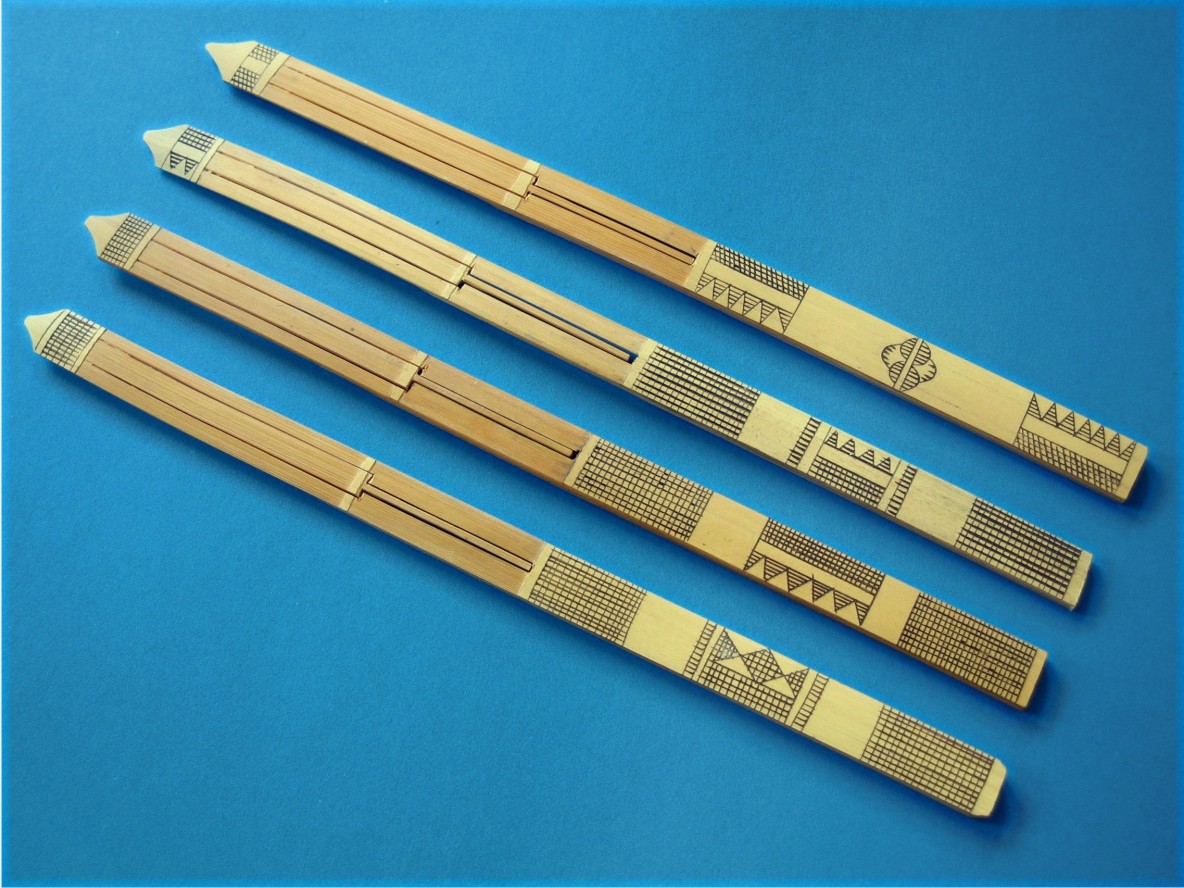
Bamboo Jew's harps

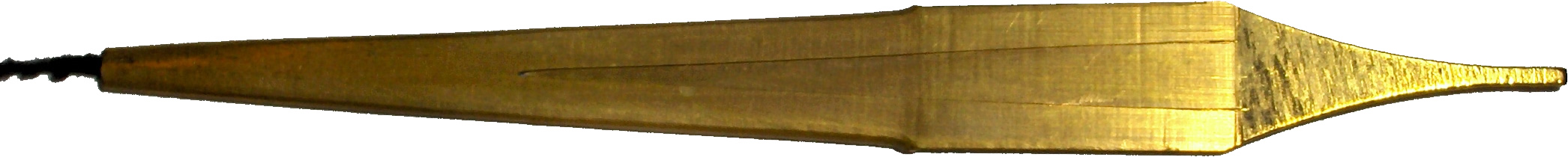
Bass Đàn môi

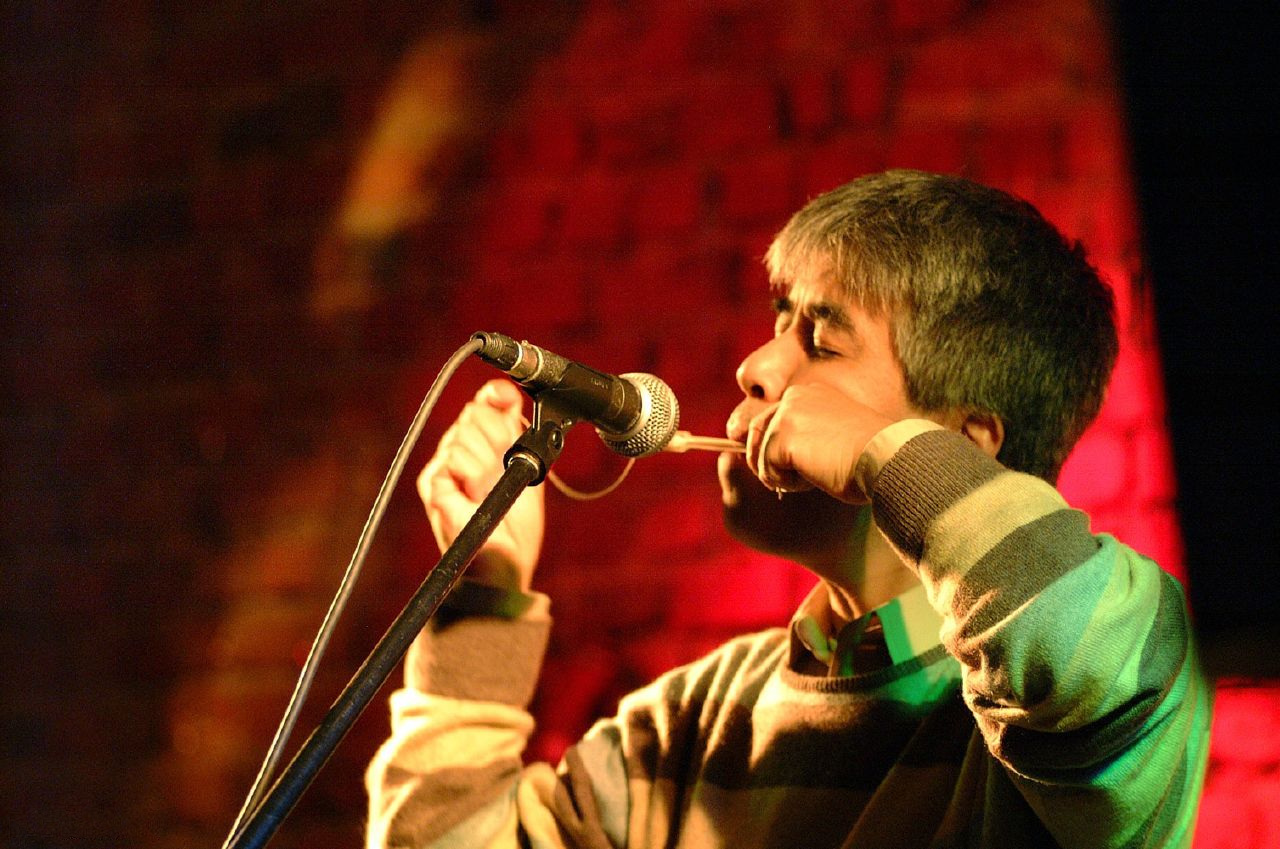
Leo Tadagawa playing a mukkuri

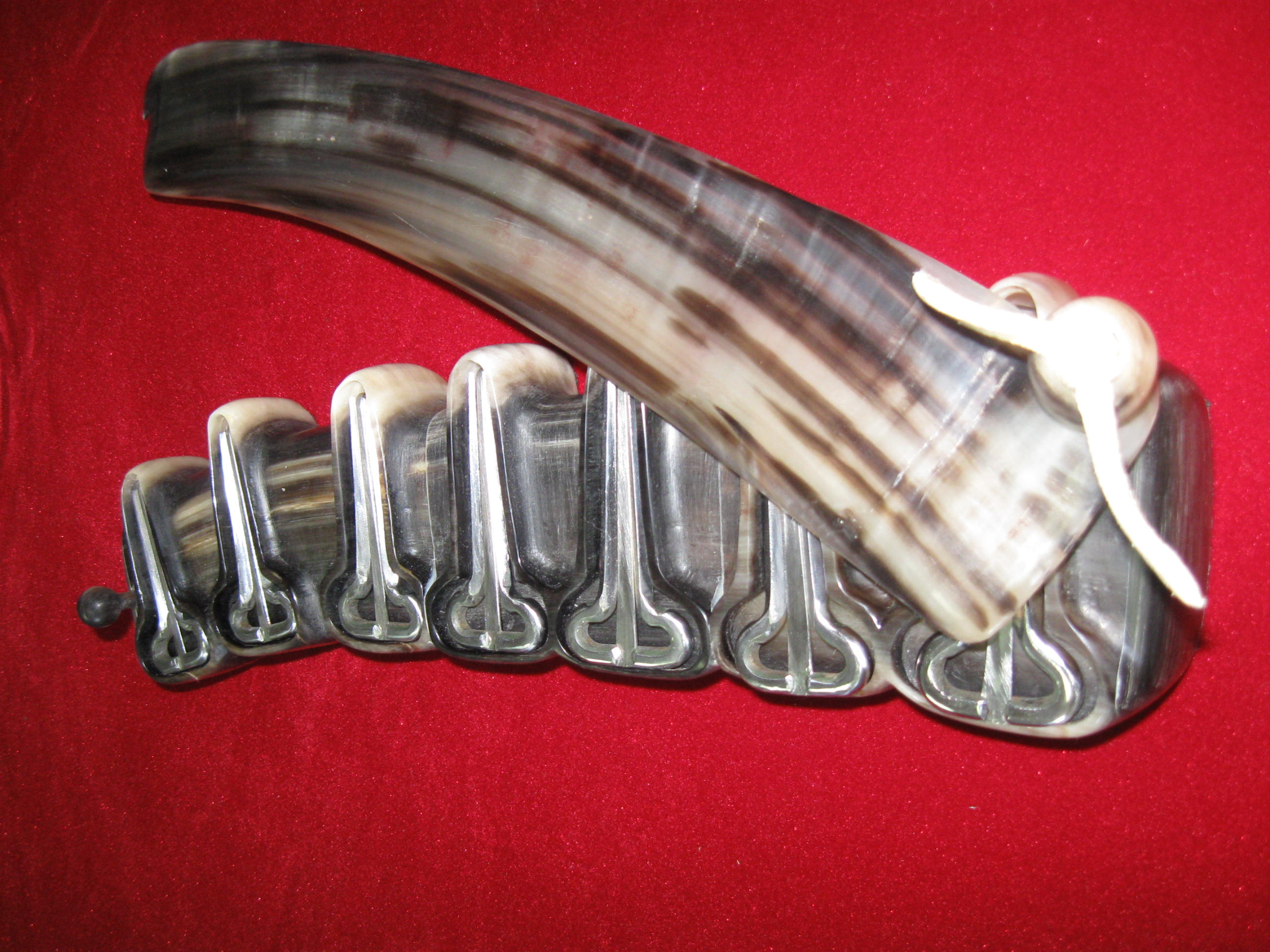
7 tuned Kyrgyz komuz

This is a list of musical pieces and songs that include or feature the Jew's harp or other resonance based lamellophones. Jew's harp music is Library of Congress Subject Heading M175.J4.

Famous Jew's harpists include the German musicians Father Bruno Glatzl (1721–1773) of Melk Abbey (for whom Albrechtsberger wrote his concerti), Franz Koch (1761–1831), who was discovered by Frederick the Great, and, "the most famous," Karl Eulenstein (1802–1890). "Four of the famous Jew's Harp virtuosos of the world," today are Svein Westad, Leo Tadagawa, Trần Quang Hải, and the late John Wright (1948–2013). Other performers include Phons Bakx and the earlier Angus Lawrie and Patric Devane. US country musician Jimmie Fadden played the Jew's harp on many albums.

In the experimental period at the end of the 18th and beginning of the 19th century there were very virtuoso instrumentalists on the mouth harp. Thus, for example, Johann Heinrich Scheibler was able to mount up to ten mouth harps on a support disc. He called the instrument "Aura". Each mouth harp was tuned to different basic tones, which made even chromatic sequences possible.

— Walter Maurer, 1983 (translated from German)

== 1700s ==
- Johann Heinrich Hörmann: Partita for Jews Harp and 8 other instruments (c.1730). Recorded by Othmar Costa conducting the Innsbrucker Kammerorchester (1971).
- Johann Georg Albrechtsberger: four surviving Concerti for Jew's Harp & Mandora in D, E♭, E, and F (1769–1771), 2 recorded by Hans Stadlmair conducting the Munich Chamber Orchestra (1981)

== 1900s ==
- Charles Ives: "Washington's Birthday" (1909), A Symphony: New England Holidays (1913)
- Flanagan Brothers: "On the Road to the Fair" and "Miss McLeod's Reel" (1920s or 30s), "melodic style"
- La Bolduc: "Ton amour, ma Catherine" (1930)
- Henry Hall Orchestra with Phyllis Robins: "I Took My Harp to a Party" (1933)
- Jenny Howard: "I Took My Harp to a Party" (1933)
- Sonny Terry: Sonny Terry's New Sound: The Jawharp In Blues & Folk Music (1961, FS 3821)
- The Beatles: "The Fool on the Hill", Magical Mystery Tour (1967), "single boing"
- The High Level Ranters (Colin Ross): Northumberland Forever (1968/1997)
- Jack Elliott: "Broken Tanner", "Jack's Choice", and "In the Bar-Room", Jack Elliott of Birtley: The songs and stories of a Durham miner (1969)
- Leonard Cohen: "Story of Isaac" and "Tonight Will Be Fine", Songs from a Room (1969)
- John Wright: La Guimbarde (1971)
- The Who: "Join Together" (1972), "fine melodic riff"
- The Beach Boys: Steamboat
- Emanuele Calanduccio: U Marranzanu (1973)
- Leonard Cohen: "Is This What You Wanted", New Skin for the Old Ceremony (1974)
- Mario Ruspoli: Les Guimbardes (1974)
- Various: "Banish Misfortune" (John, Michael, and David Wright), The Lark in the Clear Air (1974)
- Various: North America Jew's Harp Festival 1997 Highlights (1997)
- Makigami Koichi: Electric Eel (1998), "newly invented versions of the jaw harp"
- Albert Smith: "The Pigeon On the Gate - Stepdance" (1977), The Voice of the People Volume 14: Troubles They Are But Few (1998)
- Oberallgäuer Maultrommerltrio: Allgäuer Volksmusik auf der Maultrommel (1979)
- The Clash: "The Guns of Brixton", London Calling (1979), "sound effect"
- Red Hot Chili Peppers: "Give It Away", Blood Sugar Sex Magik (1991)
- Various: Khomus: Jew's Harp Music Of Turkic Peoples In The Urals, Siberia, And Central Asia (1995)
- The instrument features prominently in the opening theme and the score to the 1990s British animated television show, Oakie Doke. ""
- The instrument can be heard as part of the background music on the late 1970s / early 1980s American TV show Dukes of Hazzard, particularly during the chase sequences.
- Various: Maultrommel Molln (1996), "Jew's Harp music from Austria and its neighbor countries"
- Trân Quang Haï: Jew's Harps of the World (1998), "This recording features jew's harps from Bali, Yakutiya, Bashkiriya, Austria, and Norway, and also from different peoples of Vietnam."
- Willie Kemp: "Glendarel Highlands", "Lovat Scouts", and "Monymusk", The Voice of the People Volume 7: First I'm Going to Tell You a Ditty (1998)
- Tapani Varis: Jews Harp (1998), "solo and accompanied Jew's harp...collection of Finnish and Norwegian folk tunes...variety of harps"
- Huun-Huur-Tu: "Sagly Khadyn Turu-La Boor (It's Probably Windy On Sandy Steppe)", Where Young Grass Grows (1999)
- The Jew Harp is used to play the theme song alongside the accordion in the Yugoslav movie Ko To Tamo Peva (1980).

== 2000s ==
- Svein Westad: Munnharpas Verden German: The World of the Jew's Harp (2000) "Traditional and contemporary Jew's Harp compositions from Norway, Ireland, Vietnam, Indonesia, China, Japan, India and Kyrgyzstan performed by," Westad, Tadagawa, Trần, and Wright.
- Traditional Kazakh: "Kuu" (Nurlanbek Nishanov), "Jew's Harp Melody" (Edil Huseinov), The Silk Road: A Musical Caravan, Smithsonian Folkways Recordings #40438 (2002), "elaborate Jew's harp techniques of Kazakhstan"
- The OddTones: We're Allowed (2002)
- Various: Fourth International Jew's Harp Festival (2002)
- Kid Rock: unspecified tracks (Jimmie "Bones" Trombly), Kid Rock (2003)
- David Simons: "Four Kotekan", Prismatic Hearing (2004)
- Miranda Lambert: "Me and Charlie Talking", Kerosene (2004)
- John Zorn: "Terumah" (Rashanim), Masada Rock (2005)
- Wu Man: "Old Joe Clark" (Lee Knight), Wu Man and Friends (2005)
- Johnny Cash: "God's Gonna Cut You Down", American V: A Hundred Highways (2006)
- Wang Li: Guimbarde (2006)
- Elizabeth Cook: "Times Are Tough in Rock 'N Roll", Balls (2007)
- Alan Jackson: "Good Time", Good Time (2008)
- Imogen Heap: "2-1", Ellipse (2009)
- Animal Collective: "Lion in a Coma", Merriweather Post Pavilion (2009)
- Thomas Dolby: "The Toad Lickers" (performed by Imogen Heap), A Map of the Floating City (2011)
- Wang Li: Reve de Sang (2011)
- Leonard Cohen: "Nightingale", Dear Heather (2004)
- Sam Lee: "Wild Wood Amber", Ground of his Own (2012)
- Karolina Cicha: "Za rieczkaju", 9 Languages (2013)
- Faun: "Tanz Mit Mir", Von den Elben (2013)
- Dirtwire: "Ibex" and "Taiga", Ondar EP (2014)
- Wang Li: Past, Present, Future (2014)
- Kepa Junkera: "Marea Zumaian", Maletak (2016)
- Wang Li and Wu Wei: Overtones (2016)
- Tyler Childers: "WhiteHouse Road" Purgatory (2017)
- Tapani Varis: "Munniharppuuna" (1996)
- Go_A: "SHUM", SHUM (2021)
- Big Thief: "Spud Infinity", Dragon New Warm Mountain I Believe in You (2022)
- Otyken with Ummet Ozcan: "Altay" (2023)
- Cameron Winter: "Cancer of the Skull", Heavy Metal (2024)
- Peyton Blake: "Esophaguys Original Soundtrack" (2025)
