= Vitalization =

Vitalization may refer to:

- Vitalization, a 2007 album by Vital Information
- Vitalization (song), a 2013 Japanese-language song by Nana Mizuki
