= Edenvale =

Edenvale or Eden Vale may refer to:

== Places ==
- Edenvale, South Africa, South Africa
  - Edenvale (House of Assembly of South Africa constituency)
- Edenvale, County Antrim, a townland in County Antrim, Northern Ireland; see List of townlands of County Antrim
- Edenvale (San Jose), a neighborhood of San Jose, California
- Edenvale, Ontario, a village in Ontario, Canada
- Edenvale, Queensland, a neighbourhood in Kingaroy, Australia
- Eden Vale, a hamlet Castle Eden parish, County Durham, England
- Vale of Eden, a Cumbrian valley, UK.

== Other uses ==
- Eden Vale (brand), a former brand of dairy products in the UK

== See also ==
- Eden Valley (disambiguation)
