= Everhaunt Haunted House =

Haunted attraction outside Buffalo, New York

Everhaunt
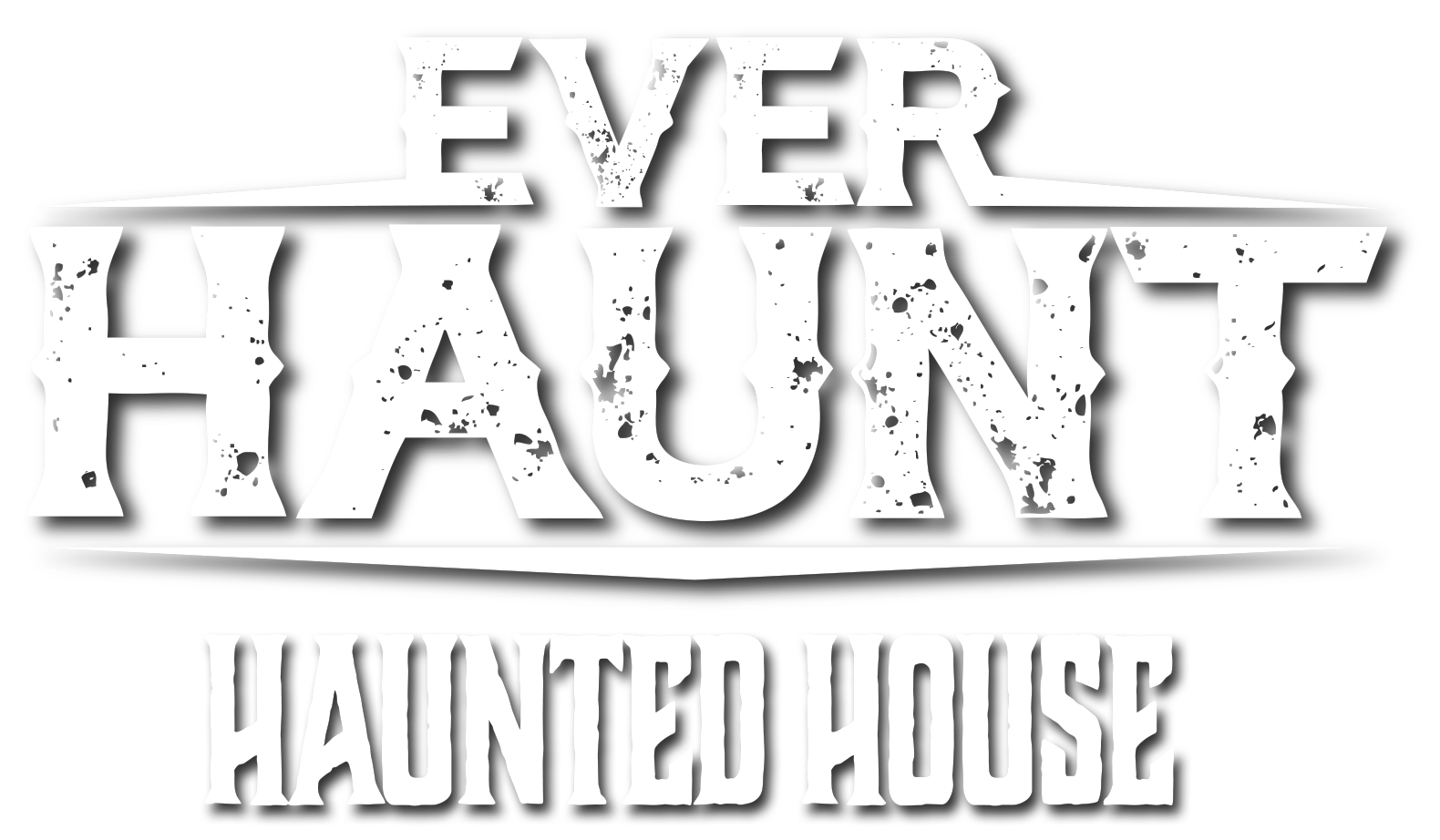
- Interactive map of Everhaunt
- Location: 144 Lake Street; Angola, New York
- Coordinates: 42.63827°N 79.03528°W
- Opened: 2019
- Owner: Kevin Donovan
- Theme: Halloween
- Operating season: Fall
- Website: Official website

Everhaunt Haunted House is a self-guided, walk-through Halloween Experience/haunted attraction located near Buffalo, NY, in Erie County, New York. It is a seasonal Halloween-based event which opened in 2019. Everhaunt currently contains multiple haunted houses, escape rooms, midway games, virtual reality rides, and Halloween shows. Night-time events are not recommended for children under 12 years of age. Everhaunt also operates Western New York Family Fall Festivals in October which involve a lights-on haunted attraction for children.

== History ==
Everhaunt started out as a Halloween party back in 2012 with donations being accepted for a friend fighting cancer. The party happened each year and in 2017 grew too big for its original location. Each year a new charity was chosen to benefit from the event. During this time, founder Kevin Donovan had traveled over 160,000 miles to find unique haunted house props, animatronics and set pieces as well as learn from other Haunted Attraction owners. In 2019, Everhaunt found its permanent location at the old Angola rollercade in Angola, New York.

== Attractions ==
Everhaunt changes its attractions regularly adding new themes while updating existing effects. The current attractions, as of 2023, are "ROSEWOOD COUNTY ASYLUM" and "DELAWARE CREEK ESTATES", which are both indoor haunted houses. Both haunted houses contain simulation experiences as well as the guided walkthrough. In addition, Everhaunt contains other attractions including "Escape From Holland Road", based on a local horror story, "Escape from Frankenstein", and "Buried Alive" a coffin ride where you placed in a real casket. The Delaware Creek Pumpkin Spectacular was added in 2023, an outside attraction, that contains thousands of carved pumpkins, giant figures, midway games, and a vortex tunnel.

Everhaunt is known for its original monsters rather than using movie or television intellectual properties. Additionally, is known for its special effects, highly detailed sets, and claustrophobic feel. Retired attractions include "The House of 7 Secrets" and "Earthquake: Thrill Experience", in which guests went through a true earthquake simulation experience.

== Horror Icon Series ==
Each year since 2019 Everhaunt has brought in horror actors or other celebrities for special meet and greet events.

Some of these guests include:

- Seth Gilliam, Father Gabriel from The Walking Dead
- C.J. Graham, Jason Voorhees from Friday the 13th Part 6.
- Alex Vincent, Andy Barclay from Child's Play.
- Robby Takac, Bassist/Singer from Goo Goo Dolls acted at Everhaunt in 2021 as well.

== Charitable & Community Outreach ==
Each year Everhaunt teams up with several charity partners around the Western New York region. These partners include or have included Roswell Park Comprehensive Cancer Institute, Kids Escaping Drugs, Friends of Night People, John R. Oishei Children's Hospital, Operation Good Neighbor, ConnectLife, MusicIsArt, Sweet Buffalo, and others.

Additionally in 2021, Everhaunt teamed up with Sweet Buffalo to give a young girl fighting cancer a Halloween Day to remember.

Everhaunt has taken part in community events such as Eden Corn Festival, Musicisart, and Angola, New York Sesquicentennial.

== Awards ==
- Selected as Best New Haunted House in USA 2019 by Haunt Rater
- Selected as Buffalo's Best Haunted House Attraction by WIVB Channel 4 – 2019
- Rated #12 in America by Scurryface
- Rated #5 Nationwide by Coasternation
- Selected as Best Indoor Attraction in Buffalo by The Buffalo News Best of 716 – 2022
- Selected as Scariest Haunted House in New York State by Coaster Nation
- Selected as Best Indoor Attraction in Buffalo by The Buffalo News Best of 716 – 2023
- Rated One of New York's Top Haunted Attractions by NYS Rail
- Selected #12 Haunted Attraction in the US by One37Pm
- Selected #7 Rated Haunted House in America by Attractions of America
- Selected Winner 2024 Community Impact and Character Award from The Southtowns Regional Chamber of Commerce
