= List of Cross Ange episodes =

Cover of the first volume of the Blu-ray release by King Records.

Cross Ange: Rondo of Angels and Dragons also known as simply Cross Ange is a Japanese mecha anime television series produced by Sunrise, with Yoshiharu Ashino serving as director, Mitsuo Fukuda acting as creative producer, Akiko Shikata composing the music and Tatsuto Higuchi handling series scripts. The series aired on Tokyo MX, MBS, TVA, BS11 from October 4, 2014, to March 28, 2015. It was licensed by Sentai Filmworks for a digital and home media release in North America.

Four pieces of theme music are used. The first opening theme, titled "Kindan no Resistance" (禁断のレジスタンス, Kindan no Rejisutansu; lit. 'Forbidden Resistance'), is performed by Nana Mizuki and the second opening theme is Shinjitsu no Mokushiroku" (真実の黙示録; lit. 'Apocalypse of Truth" or "Revelations of Reality') by Yoko Takahashi. The ending themes used with the respective opening themes are "Rinrei" (凛麗; lit. 'Cold Beauty') performed by Eri Kitamura and "Shūmatsu no Love Song" (終末のラブソング, Shūmatsu no Rabu Songu; lit. 'Love Song of the End'), also performed by Mizuki. The insert song featured in episodes five, nine, and twenty-two is "Necessary", once again performed by Nana Mizuki.

== Episode list ==
No.	Title	Directed by	Written by	Storyboarded by	Original air date (Note: Tokyo MX uses an after-midnight programming schedule, so that the first broadcast was listed at October 4, 2014 at 25:30, which is October 5, at 1:30am JST.: TOKYO MX ＊ 「クロスアンジュ 天使と竜の輪舞」 (in Japanese). Archived from the original on October 16, 2014. – shows premiere date and time; "TOKYO MX ＊ 番組表" [Tokyo MX Programming Schedule]. Tokyo MX. October 25, 2014. Archived from the original on October 24, 2014. – shows typical Tokyo MX listing of episode 4 with after midnight schedule)
1	"The Fallen Imperial Princess"; Transliteration: "Otosareta kōjo" (Japanese: 堕とされた皇女)	Noriaki Akitaya; Mitsuo Fukuda (mechanical)	Tatsuto Higuchi	Yoshiharu Ashino; Mitsuo Fukuda	October 4, 2014
With the highly advanced information technology Mana in hand, mankind overcame all problems on the earth such as war, famine, and pollution with its magical power. At last, they have obtained an ideal world where they can live in peace and have no worries. Enter Angelise Ikaruga Misurugi, the first princess of the Misurugi Empire. She, too, was supposed to be blessed and crowned by her people without any inconvenience. However, on her 16th birthday, she is confronted with the fact that she is a Norma. "Norma" is a cruel slur to denote an "irregular, antisocial, non-human thing" that cannot use Mana. Deprived of everything, she is quarantined and taken to a remote military base. There, she is informed by the prison warden, Jill, that her own empire has disowned her, and that her only worth now is in joining a privatized army. Even her name is forfeit, as she will now be known as "Ange".
2	"Defiant Soul"; Transliteration: "Matsurowanu tamashī" (Japanese: まつろわぬ魂)	Hitoyuki Matsui; Mitsuo Fukuda (mechanical)	Tatsuto Higuchi	Yoshiharu Ashino; Mitsuo Fukuda	October 11, 2014
Sent to the frontline base Arzenal, what awaits Ange is a confrontation with the Norma girls of the First Company. This includes her new captain, Zola, as well as Salia, Hilda, Vivian, Ersha, Chris, Rosalie, and new recruits Coco and Miranda. It is revealed that Arzenal is a penal military colony where the Norma are trained to ride Para-mails, high-performance fighters that can transform into mecha, to fight otherworldly invaders called Dimensional Rift Attuned Gargantuan Organic Neotypes, or DRAGONs. Despite the First Company being quite kind to her, Ange cannot accept the reality that she is a Norma herself, and rudely looks down on the team she is set to be a part of. Even as she is being trained and conditioned for her new role in life, she stubbornly continues to act as Princess Angelise. When the first opportunity presents itself, she tries to escape Arzenal during her first Para-mail sortie, and the result is a tragedy.
3	"Villkiss Awakens"; Transliteration: "Virukisu kakusei" (Japanese: ヴィルキス覚醒)	Shun Kudō; Mitsuo Fukuda (mechanical)	Tatsuto Higuchi	Mitsuo Fukuda	October 18, 2014
Ange encounters the DRAGONs for the first time as she tries to leave Arzenal. Terrified by the savage creatures, she attempts to flee for her life. She only succeeds in crashing her Para-mail, but not before getting the other rookies and Zola killed. Afterwards, she is insulted and abused by her Norma teammates for the roles she played in their fallen comrades' deaths, and is forced to mark the graves of those she got killed. Forced into a corner by the cruel reality of what she is, Ange chooses to stand on the battlefield to die, and is given the opportunity to do so by riding the Villkiss, an aircraft with a shady history.
4	"Lonely Mutiny"; Transliteration: "Hitori botchi no hangyaku" (Japanese: ひとりぼっちの反逆)	Noriyuki Nomata	Tatsuto Higuchi	Hiiro Terigaki; Hitoyuki Matsui; Yoshiharu Ashino	October 25, 2014
With Villkiss having awakened and become Ange's personal machine, Ange has accepted herself as a Norma and decides to live as a soldier, but without knowing for what purpose she lives for. Her arrogance and indifference to those around her incite those who hate her, and harassment and tricks swirl around her. Ange finds herself in a tight spot when Hilda, seeking to avenge the Norma who were killed by Ange's previous cowardice, sabotages Villkiss herself.
5	"Ange Loss"; Transliteration: "Anju, sōshitsu" (Japanese: アンジュ、喪失)	Shunsuke Machitani	Tatsuto Higuchi	Mitsuo Fukuda	November 1, 2014
As a result of Hilda sabotaging Villkiss, Ange is declared missing in action. Thankfully, she is revealed to be alive, and was rescued by a mysterious man named Tusk. She spends her days alone with him and wonders where she belongs. She struggles with whether she should run away from her Norma days. But the nature she bears is not going to allow her to stay here.
6	"Momoka Has Arrived!"; Transliteration: "Momoka ga kita!" (Japanese: モモカが来た!)	Yoshimitsu Ōhashi	Noboru Kimura	Yoshimitsu Ōhashi	November 8, 2014
Momoka Oginome, who was Angelise's head maid in the Misurugi Empire, appears in Arzenal in pursuit of Ange. Confronted with her past, which she has already discarded, Ange is at a loss. She is also bitter towards Momoka, who still adores and is devoted to her as before. She then has to make a decision on Momoka's presence in her life, whether she allows her to stay, or leaves it up to the officials at Arzenal to decide her fate.
7	"Salia's Gloom"; Transliteration: "Saria no yūutsu" (Japanese: サリアの憂鬱)	Akira Toba	Tatsuto Higuchi	Hitoyuki Matsui	November 15, 2014
The company's teamwork is in a state of collapse due to Ange's unrestrained behavior. Captain Salia's stress continues to build up. There is a limit to how much stress she can release, and she finally explodes, leading to a brawl. In the midst of this, the First Company is confronted by the arrival of a new type of large DRAGON.
8	"Bikini Escape"; Transliteration: "Bikini esukeipu" (Japanese: ビキニ・エスケイプ)	Kazuo Miyake	Tōru Nozaki	Masami Shimoda	November 22, 2014
Ange is shaken by a transmission from her younger sister Sylvia calling for help, a trace of the past she thought she had broken up with. Soon after, the annual Mermaid Festa is held in Arzenal. Behind the Festa, Ange and Hilda each have their own plans to escape, and ultimately forge a shaky alliance to achieve their ends.
9	"Traitorous Homeland"; Transliteration: "Uragiri no furusato" (Japanese: 裏切りの故郷)	Hiromichi Matano	Mayori Sekijima	Tatsufumi Itō	November 29, 2014
After escaping from Arzenal, Ange returns to the Misurugi Empire to rescue her sister Sylvia. Hilda is thrilled to be reunited with her mother after her long-awaited return home. However, they face a number of trials and tribulations in their hometown, and neither of them find what they are looking for.
10	"Goodbye From the Gallows"; Transliteration: "Kōshudai kara sayonara o" (Japanese: 絞首台からサヨナラを)	Yasuaki Fujii	Tatsuto Higuchi	Osamu Kamei	December 6, 2014
In the Misurugi Empire, Ange is confronted by her ruthless brother Julio, who is revealed to have manipulated Sylvia into hating her, and Ange is caught in a trap set by her elitist siblings. On the gallows, amidst the frenzy and abuse of the Misurugi people, she furiously disowns her own homeland when she sees how monstrous their one-sided prejudice towards the Norma make them.
11	"Dragon Song"; Transliteration: "Ryū no uta" (Japanese: 竜の歌)	Noriyuki Nomata; Mitsuo Fukuda	Tōru Nozaki	Mitsuo Fukuda	December 13, 2014
After Ange and Momoka escape Misurugi with the help of Tusk, Arzenal receives a massive DRAGON swoop directly above it. In the midst of the battle without Ange and Hilda (who were detained for escaping Arzenal), Salia's feelings for Jill and Villkiss run wild. When Ange rushes to the scene, she is met by a strange young woman riding a machine that resembles a Para-mail, leading the pack of DRAGONs.
12	"The Right Arm's Past"; Transliteration: "Migiude no kako" (Japanese: 右腕の過去)	Hitoyuki Matsui	Tatsuto Higuchi	Hitoyuki Matsui	December 20, 2014
Jill decides to reveal her horrific past to Ange, and the truth behind Villkiss. Not long after, Ange must confront another shocking reality when she learns what the DRAGONs truly are. Meanwhile, Julio collaborates with a strange man called Embryo regarding the destruction of the world.
13	"Arzenal Burns"; Transliteration: "Aruzenaru, enjō" (Japanese: 武器工廠(アルゼナル)、炎上)	Yoshimitsu Ōhashi	Eizō Kobayashi	Masami Shimoda; Mitsuo Fukuda	January 3, 2015
The Para-mail forces are attacked by an overwhelming force led by Julio, standing no chance after the overwhelming attack of the strange lady from before. Within Arzenal, hand-to-hand combat begins between the Norma fighting for their lives and Julio's fanatical army. In the midst of the chaotic battle, Ange, alone, rushes toward Julio with the intent of killing her vile brother.
14	"Ange and Tusk"; Transliteration: "Anju to Tasuku" (Japanese: アンジュとタスク)	Takeyuki Yanase	Mayori Sekijima	Tatsufumi Itō	January 10, 2015
After a close encounter with Embryo and a very quick reunion, Ange and Tusk are transported by Villkiss to a mysterious world. The two of them, accompanied by Vivian, wander around the ruins. With no clear future in sight, they find themselves in a situation that makes them rethink their lives, and Ange decides to confront what she feels about Tusk.
15	"Another Earth"; Transliteration: "Mō hitotsu no chikyū" (Japanese: もう一つの地球)	Tomokazu Iwasaki	Tōru Nozaki	Hitoyuki Matsui	January 17, 2015
Ange, held captive by the DRAGON clan, comes face to face with its princess, the Ryuu-Shin-Ki pilot Salamandinay. Here, on the "true" Earth, Ange and Tusk witness the true nature of Aura's people living on the primordial earth. New truths are revealed.
16	"Resonating Front Lines"; Transliteration: "Kyōmei sensen" (Japanese: 共鳴戦線)	Yukihiko Asaki	Tatsuto Higuchi	Hideki Hosokawa	January 24, 2015
Ange refuses Sala's call to fight together, and a duel takes place in the ancient arena, with Ange and Sala's future at stake. While Ange is locked in disagreement and debate with Sala, the shadow of Embryo looms over the world.
17	"Dark Angel of Destruction"; Transliteration: "Kuro no hakai tenshi" (Japanese: 黒の破壊天使)	Hitoyuki Matsui	Eizō Kobayashi	Osamu Kamei; Mitsuo Fukuda; Yoshiharu Ashino	January 31, 2015
After finally forming a truce with Sala following a cataclysmic event caused by Embryo, Ange is torn between a lie and the truth, wondering what she should be from now on. When information arrives that Aura is in Misurugi's basement, a major invasion of Misurugi is launched with the full force of the DRAGON army in order to recapture it. However, Ange and her new allies are not prepared when a trio of black machines resembling Villkiss appear to oppose them.
18	"Conclusive Ocean"; Transliteration: "Ketsubetu no umi" (Japanese: 決別の海)	Yasuaki Fujii	Mayori Sekijima	Tetsuya Watanabe; Masami Shimoda	February 7, 2015
After an encounter with Salia, Chris and Ersha, all in allegiance to Embryo, Ange and her friends reunite with Hilda and join Aurora. However, Ange is strongly repulsed by Jill's insistence on the Libertas plan, and her willingness to do whatever it takes to achieve her goal.
19	"The Tuner of Time"; Transliteration: "Toki no Chōritsusha" (Japanese: 時の調律者)	Tatsufumi Itō	Tatsuto Higuchi	Toshiharu Murata; Yoshiharu Ashino; Mitsuo Fukuda	February 14, 2015
After a battle with Embryo's Diamond Rose Knights, Ange is captured by Salia and meets Embryo face-to-face in Misurugi. Now she is confronted with the man who calls himself the conductor of this world, and his twisted motivations.
20	"God's Soul-Searching"; Transliteration: "Kami no kyūkon" (Japanese: 神の求魂)	Akira Toba	Tatsuto Higuchi	Susumu Nishizawa	February 21, 2015
Ange is overwhelmed by Embryo, who reveals his true nature, and her mind is cornered. Meanwhile, in Aurora, a feud spreads around Jill, and Hilda is forced to take action herself.
21	"The Survivors"; Transliteration: "Nokosareru mono" (Japanese: 遺されるもの)	Tomokazu Iwasaki	Tōru Nozaki; Tatsuto Higuchi	Osamu Kamei; Masami Shimoda	February 28, 2015
Ange and Momoka try to escape from Embryo, but their relentless pursuit leaves them with nowhere to run. Hilda and Rosalie face Chris in the midst of the chaos, and are soon shocked by her ruthlessness. Their conflicting feelings and strong emotions lead to more tragedy.
22	"Necessary"	Hiroshi Aoyama	Tatsuto Higuchi	Tatsufumi Itō	March 7, 2015
The creation of a new world by Embryo begins, and the two worlds start to collapse. Sala and Hilda team up to prevent the fusion of time and space, but there is no way out. Ersha begins to realize her mistake in siding with Embryo when she sees what kind of person he truly is, and chooses to opt out and return to Arzenal. Ange, meanwhile, is alone and in despair after having lost her two closest associates following her escape from Embryo.
23	"Distorted World"; Transliteration: "Yugamu sekai" (Japanese: ゆがむ世界)	Hitoyuki Matsui	Eizō Kobayashi; Tatsuto Higuchi	Masami Shimoda; Toshiharu Murata; Mitsuo Fukuda	March 14, 2015
After reuniting with Tusk, who survived, and finally being given the opportunity to profess her love to him, Ange returns to the Aurora with Tusk and Momoka (who also survived) in the chaos of the space-time fusion. Together with the people who have gathered there, Ange launches the counter-offensive operation Last Libertas. Everyone heads for the battlefield with their own thoughts and feelings in their hearts.
24	"Eve of Destruction"; Transliteration: "Asu naki tatakai" (Japanese: 明日なき戦い)	Shun Kudō; Akira Toba	Tatsuto Higuchi	Yoshimitsu Ōhashi; Osamu Kamei; Mitsuo Fukuda	March 21, 2015
Ange and Sala push forward to rescue Aura. As Jill goes after Salia in hopes of reforming her, Hilda and Rosalie confront Chris yet again, and Tusk confronts Embryo. As the two worlds begin to overlap, the fight enters its final phase.
25	"Beyond Time"; Transliteration: "Toki no kanata de" (Japanese: 時の彼方で)	Yoshiharu Ashino; Mitsuo Fukuda	Tatsuto Higuchi	Yoshiharu Ashino; Mitsuo Fukuda; Yoshimitsu Ōhashi; Osamu Kamei	March 28, 2015
The unstoppable collapse of the world begins. Having gotten Chris and Salia back on their side, the group prepare to stop Embryo's plans. Guided by the rescued Aura, Tusk is accompanied by Hilda, a redeemed Salia, and Sala as they fly through time and space to rescue Ange, who has been captured by Embryo yet again. A final battle against the world's engineer takes place to decide the fate of multiple worlds.
