= EOE =

EOE may refer to:

- Encyclopedia of Earth, an electronic reference work
- EOE: Eve of Extinction, a video game
- The End of Evangelion, an anime film
- Echoes of Eternity, an American metal band
- Engine output energy, a reference value considered in the European emission standards for trucks
- "Errors and omissions excepted", a legal phrase
- Eosinophilic esophagitis, an allergic inflammatory condition
- European Option Exchange, now part of Euronext Amsterdam
- Newberry County Airport (FAA location ID: EOE), in South Carolina, United States
- Equal opportunity employer

== See also ==
- East of Eden (disambiguation)
