= Märchen & Mythen =

Studio album by Faun
- Released: 15 November 2019
- Studio: Tonschale Studio; Principal Studios; Tonfabrik Berlin; Q7 Studios
- Genre: Schlager
- Length: 1:03:35
- Language: German
- Label: We Love Music; Electrola; Universal Music Group
- Producer: Alexander Schulz; Jörg Umbreit; Henning Verlage

Faun chronology
XV – Best Of (2018)	Märchen & Mythen (2019)	Pagan (2022)

Märchen & Mythen ("Fairy Tales & Myths" in German) is the tenth studio album by German band Faun, released on 15 November 2019 through We Love Music, Electrola and Universal Music Group. It is the first full length studio album to feature member Laura Fella, and the last to feature founding member Fiona Frewert (née Rüggeberg).

== Reception ==
Leoni Dowidat of Sonic Seducer described Märchen & Mythen as a success. The critic wrote that it combines lightness and depth in a way that "captivates and delights, enchants and inspires". Sven Kabelitz of laut.de called the album a "cliché bloodbath" with banal lyrics. The song "Aschenbrödel" is based on the theme music from the popular Christmas film Drei Haselnüsse für Achenbrödel, and Kabelitz wrote that it was cynical to release it as a Christmas single. Kabelitz wrote that the promises of early Faun albums like Zaubersprüche and Licht here have been simplified into cheesy and inauthentic "pagan schlager".

Märchen & Mythen entered the German album chart on sixth place on 22 November 2019. It remained on the chart for twelve weeks.

== Track listing ==
No.	Title	Lyrics	Music	Length
1.	"Es War Einmal..."	Oliver Satyr	Faun	02:42
2.	"Rosenrot"	Fiona Rüggeberg; Laura Fella; Satyr; Stephan Groth	Faun	03:35
3.	"Seemann"	Groth	traditional	04:35
4.	"Hagazussa"	Satyr	Faun	04:59
5.	"Sieben Raben"	Satyr	Faun	04:33
6.	"Aschenbrödel"	Fella; Satyr	Karel Svoboda	03:31
7.	"Die Weisse Dame"	Rüggeberg; Michael Frewert	Rüggeberg	04:44
8.	"Jorinde"	Satyr	Faun	03:55
9.	"Spieglein, Spieglein"	Rüggeberg; Fella; Satyr; Groth	Faun	03:41
10.	"Drei Wanderer" (featuring Versengold)	Carl Busse	traditional	03:16
11.	"Holla"	Groth	Faun	06:22
12.	"The Lily"	Fella	Faun	05:30
13.	"Falada"	Satyr	Faun	03:59
14.	"Thalia"	Fella	Faun	04:30
15.	"Sieben Raben (acoustic)"	Satyr	Faun	04:22
Total length:				1:03:35

== Personnel ==
Faun

- Oliver Satyr – vocals, bouzouki, nyckelharpa, lute, harp, guitar
- Fiona Frewert – vocals, flute, chalumeau, bagpipes, dulcimer
- Rüdiger Maul – drums, percussion
- Niel Mitra – sampler, synthesizer, beats
- Stephan Groth – vocals, hurdy gurdy, cittern
- Laura Fella – vocals, mandola

Guests

- Flo Janoske – violin on track 2 and 10
- Malte Hoyer – vocals on track 10
- Otto Mellies – voice on track 1

== Charts ==
Chart (2019)	Peak position
Austrian Albums (Ö3 Austria)	59
German Albums (Offizielle Top 100)	6
Swiss Albums (Schweizer Hitparade)	27
