= Luna (Faun album) =

Studio album by Faun
- Released: 5 September 2014
- Genre: Medieval folk rock
- Label: Universal, Polydor
- Producer: Valicon Entertainment

Faun chronology
Von den Elben (2013)	Luna (2014)	Midgard (2016)

Luna is the eighth studio album by the German medieval folk band Faun. It was released on 5 September 2014 and has become Faun's most successful release.

== Reception ==
The Sonic Seducer wrote that Faun appeared to be unsure of their direction on this album. The reviewer remarked an original songwriting and the reduction of singer Katja Moslehner's "all too changeable voice", but also criticized influences of mainstream pop music.

== Track listing ==
Luna includes the following tracks.

All lyrics are written by Oliver S. Tyr except where noted; all music is composed by Faun, Ingo Politz and Bernd Wendlandt except where noted.

No.	Title	Lyrics	Music	Length
1.	"Luna Prolog"		Oliver S. Tyr, Fiona Rüggeberg, Groth, Niel Mitra, Rüdiger Maul, Ingo Politz, Bernd Wendlandt	1:25
2.	"Walpurgisnacht" (Lyrics by Oliver S. Tyr and Stephan Groth)			3:49
3.	"Buntes Volk" (Feat. Michael Rhein)	Oliver S. Tyr		4:16
4.	"Menuett" (Music: 18th-century traditional, Faun, Politz, Wendlandt)			4:56
5.	"Hekate"			4:15
6.	"Blaue Stunde" (Lyrics by Oliver S. Tyr and Stephan Groth)			4:35
7.	"Cuncti Simus" (Lyrics: 14th-century traditional extracted from Red Book of Montserrat)			3:56
8.	"Hörst du die Trommeln"			3:23
9.	"Die wilde Jagd"			3:28
10.	"Frau Erde" (Lyrics by Katja Moslehner and Oliver S. Tyr)			4:28
11.	"Hymne der Nacht"			5:00
12.	"Abschied" (Lyrics by Joseph von Eichendorff)			3:27
13.	"Wind und Geige XIV" (Deluxe edition bonus track)			4:04
14.	"Die Lieder werden bleiben" (Deluxe edition bonus track, lyrics by Stephan Groth. Based on "Rodrigo Martínez"(Anonymous), extracted from "Cancionero de Palacio", Spanish Reinessance music)			3:18
15.	"Era Escuro" (Deluxe edition bonus track, lyrics: 14th-century Sephardic traditional theme)			3:32

== Charts ==
Luna peaked at position 4 in the German album charts making it Faun's most successful album in Germany so far. It was also Faun's first album to enter the Dutch album charts.

Chart	Peak position
German Albums (Offizielle Top 100)	4
Austrian Albums (Ö3 Austria)	20
Dutch Albums (Album Top 100)	90
Swiss Albums (Schweizer Hitparade)	12
