= Midgard (album) =

Studio album by Faun
- Released: 19 August 2016
- Studio: IP Studio (Berlin), Valicon Studio 1 (Berlin), Tonschale Studio (Landshut)
- Genre: Folk rock, pagan folk
- Length: 1:07:00
- Language: German
- Label: We Love Music, Electrola, Universal Music Group
- Producer: Ingo Politz, Bernd Wendlandt, Alexander Schulz

Faun chronology
Luna (Faun album) (2014)	Midgard (2016)	XV – Best Of (2018)

Midgard is the ninth studio album by the German band Faun, released on 19 August 2016 via Electrola (Universal Music Group). It is the final album to feature Katja Moslehner before her departure in 2017.

== Conception ==
Midgard is themed around Norse mythology. It also has elements from the Celtic-speaking area. The music takes inspiration from melodies from Sweden and Norway.

== Reception ==
Ulf Kubanke of laut.de wrote positively about the songs "Odin" and "Rabenballade", but described the album overall as sterile and too simple. Matthias Weise of Metal.de wrote that the album contains both the pop-oriented side of Faun, with "Federkleid" as a positive example, and more atmospheric tracks reminiscent of the band's early works. Weise called "Odin" especially gripping due to its interplay between lyrics and music. He described "Gold und Seide", "Brandan" and "Lange Schatten" as weak. Overall he called Midgard a "strong and playful album with great lyrics, dreamy melodies and exciting song structures".

Midgard entered the German album chart on 26 August 2016 as number three, which became its peak position. This was the highest position any Faun album had reached; the previous record was held by Luna (2014) which peaked as number four. Midgard remained on the chart for 13 weeks.

== Track listing ==
No.	Title	Lyrics	Music	Length
1.	"Midgard Prolog"	Oliver s. Tyr	Katja Moslehner, Niel Mitra, Stephan Groth	00:50
2.	"Federkleid"	Fiona Frewert, Michael Frewert	F. Frewert, Moslehner, s. Tyr, Rüdiger Maul	04:42
3.	"Sonnenreigen (Luchnasad)"	F. Frewert, M. Frewert, s. Tyr	F. Frewert, Moslehner, Mitra, s. Tyr, Maul, Groth	03:54
4.	"Alba II Intro"		Efren Lopez, Mitra	01:50
5.	"Alba II"	s. Tyr	F. Frewert, Moslehner, Mitra, s. Tyr, Maul, Groth	06:10
6.	"Nacht des Nordens"	s. Tyr	F. Frewert, Moslehner, Mitra, s. Tyr, Maul, Groth	05:34
7.	"Mac Beth"	s. Tyr	F. Frewert, Mitra, s. Tyr, Maul, Groth	05:57
8.	"Gold & Seide"	Moslehner, Groth	Moslehner, Marcus Gorstein, Mitra, s. Tyr, Maul, Groth	04:35
9.	"Brandan"	Groth	F. Frewert, Moslehner, Mitra, s. Tyr, Maul, Groth	03:58
10.	"Odin" (featuring Wardruna)	s. Tyr	Einar Selvik, F. Frewert, Mitra, s. Tyr, Maul, Groth	05:58
11.	"Rabenballade"	s. Tyr	F. Frewert, Moslehner, Mitra, s. Tyr, Maul, Groth	05:03
12.	"Lange Schatten"	F. Frewert, M. Frewert, s. Tyr	F. Frewert, Mitra, s. Tyr, Maul, Groth	03:33

Bonus tracks
No.	Title	Lyrics	Music	Length
13.	"Aufbruch"	Groth	F. Frewert, Mitra, s. Tyr, Maul, Groth	04:54
14.	"Alswinn"	s. Tyr	F. Frewert, Mitra, s. Tyr, Maul, Groth	03:47
15.	"Räven"	Moslehner	Moslehner, Maya Fridman, Mitra, s. Tyr, Maul, Groth	06:04
Total length:				1:07:00

== Personnel ==
Faun

- Oliver s. Tyr – vocals, harp, lute, nyckelharpa, bouzouki
- Fiona Frewert – vocals, flute, bagpipes, violin, chalumeau
- Rüdiger Maul – drums, percussion
- Niel Mitra – synthesizer, sampler, keyboards
- Stephan Groth – hurdy gurdy, zither, vocals
- Katja Moslehner – vocals

Guests

- Efren Lopez – lute on track 4, 5 and 8
- Maya Fridman – cello on track 5, 7, 13 and 15
- Einar Selvik – vocals, lyre, harp, percussion and bullroarer on track 10
- Martin Seeberg – violin on track 12
