= H. V. Redfield =

American journalist

Horace Victor Eugene Redfield
- Born: 1845; Eden, New York, U.S.
- Died: 1881 (aged 35–36)
- Occupation: Journalist

Horace Victor Eugene Redfield (1845–1881) was a journalist with the Cincinnati Commercial and the author of Homicide, North and South, a book comparing violence in the northern and southern United States.

He was born in Eden, New York in Erie County. When he was four his father died and he moved with his mother to Jasper, Tennessee in 1860.

Pennsylvania State University has a collection of his papers.

== Homicide, North and South ==
A year before his death, Redfield completed Homicide, North and South, an analysis of statistics for crime in general, and homicide in particular, in various northern and southern states, the latter states manifesting a higher incidence of the crimes he considered. Having grown up in the South, Redfield attributed that higher crime rate not to the erstwhile prevalence of slavery, but to an acceptance of vigilantism that he perceived there, a cultural reliance on personal retaliation for perceived wrongs where the rule of law did not have a robust presence. Redfield's book was "the first to investigate southern homicide in any depth."

== Personal life ==
Redfield married Jennette Hamlin, daughter of Byron D. Hamlin. Redfield's son, Horace Hamlin Redfield, ran a hardware store in Smethport, Pennsylvania and served a single term in the Pennsylvania General Assembly.
