= Eden Valley =

Eden Valley may refer to several places:

== In the United States ==
- Eden Valley (Nevada), a valley in Humboldt County
- Eden Valley, Minnesota, a city
- Eden Valley, New York, a hamlet

== Elsewhere ==
- Eden Valley 216, an Indian reserve in Alberta, Canada
- Eden Valley, South Australia, a town in Australia
  - Eden Valley wine region surrounding the town
- Vale of Eden, the valley of the River Eden in Cumbria, England
  - Eden Valley Railway, closed railway in the above location
  - Eden Valley Railway (heritage railway), heritage railway in the above location
- Eden Valley, New Zealand, a suburb of Auckland

== See also ==
- Eden Valley (film), a 1994 British drama film
- River Eden (disambiguation)
