= River Eden =

River Eden may refer to the following rivers in the UK:

- River Eden, Cumbria, England
- River Eden, Kent, England
- River Eden, Fife, Scotland

== See also ==
- Eden River (Dominica)
- Eden Water, a tributary of the River Tweed, Scotland
- Afon Eden, Gwynedd, Wales
- Eden Valley (disambiguation)
