= Supernal Liberty =

Studio album by Nana Mizuki
- Released: (Japan) 16 April 2014
- Genre: J-pop
- Length: 64:01
- Label: King Records

Nana Mizuki chronology
Rockbound Neighbors (2012)	Supernal Liberty (2014)	Smashing Anthems (2015)

Singles from Supernal Liberty
- 1. "Vitalization" Released: July 31, 2013; 2. "Appassionato" Released: March 22, 2014

Supernal Liberty is an album by Nana Mizuki. It was released on April 16, 2014 in three editions: a CD only edition and two limited CD+BD/DVD editions. Two limited editions includes two videos: photo shooting of the album and a special edition of the documentary Natsu no Kakera~ Mizuki Nana 2013 Natsu no Dekigoto.

== Track listing ==
1. VIRGIN CODE
  - Lyrics: Hibiki
  - Composition: Noriyasu Agematsu (Elements Garden)
  - Arrangements: Junpei Fujita (Elements Garden)
2. GUILTY
  - Lyrics: Sayuri
  - Composition: Fujimatsu-ju, Ramon Riu
  - Arrangements: Takanori Tsunoda
3. Appassionato (アパッショナート)
  - Lyrics: Nana Mizuki
  - Composition: Nana Mizuki
  - Arrangements: Hitoshi Fujima (Elements Garden)
  - TBS TV show "CDTV" opening theme for April and May
4. Egao no Yukue (笑顔の行方)
  - Lyrics: Miwa Yoshida
  - Composition: Masato Nakamura
  - Arrangements: Junpei Fujita (Elements Garden)
  - Cover version of a 1990 song by Japanese pop band, Dreams Come True
  - A duet version of the song was featured in Junichi Inagaki's album, Otoko to Onna 3 -Two Hearts Two Voices-
5. Antique Nachtmusik（アンティークナハトムジーク）
  - Lyrics: Shoko Fujibayashi
  - Composition: Takahiro Furukawa
  - Arrangements: Takahiro Furukawa
6. Fun Fun★People
  - Lyrics: Naho
  - Composition: h-wonder
  - Arrangements: h-wonder
7. FATE
  - Lyrics: Nana Mizuki
  - Composition: Jun Suyama
  - Arrangements: Jun Suyama
8. Vitalization -Aufwachen Form-
  - Lyrics: Nana Mizuki
  - Composition: Noriyasu Agematsu (Elements Garden)
  - Arrangements: Noriyasu Agematsu (Elements Garden), Daisuke Kikuta (Elements Garden)
  - Extended version of the opening theme for anime television series Senki Zesshō Symphogear G
9. Aishū Twilight (哀愁トワイライト)
  - Lyrics: Nana Mizuki
  - Composition: Hiroshi Usami
  - Arrangements: Hiroshi Usami
10. Setsuna Capacity (セツナキャパシティー)
  - Lyrics: Arata Maruta
  - Composition: Arata Maruta
  - Arrangements: Junpei Fujita (Elements Garden)
  - Ending theme for Tokyo FM Mizuki Nana M no Sekai
11. Ladyspiker
  - Lyrics: Shihori
  - Composition: Nakano Riyota
  - Arrangements: Nakano Riyota
12. Rock you baby!
  - Lyrics: Nana Mizuki
  - Composition: Naoya Endo
  - Arrangements: Tsunoda Takanori
  - Theme song for animeloLIVE! TV commercial
13. Million Ways=One Destination
  - Lyrics: Kenichi Maeyamada
  - Composition: Kenji Ito, Kenichi Maeyamada
  - Arrangements: Kenji Ito
  - Theme song for iOS/Android RPG game Kai-ri-Sei Million Arthur
14. Bokura no Mirai (僕らの未来)
  - Lyrics: Toshiro Yabuki
  - Composition: Toshiro Yabuki
  - Arrangements: Toshiro Yabuki
15. Ai no Hoshi -two hearts- (愛の星 -two hearts-)
  - Lyrics: Nana Mizuki, Eriko Yoshiki
  - Composition: Eriko Yoshiki
  - Arrangements: Hitoshi Fujima (Elements Garden), Mika Agematsu
  - Theme song for anime movie Space Battleship Yamato 2199 Chapter 7: Soshite Kan wa Iku
  - Remixed Version of the song 'Ai no Hoshi' (With added arrangements by Mika Agematsu)

== Charts ==
=== Oricon Sales Chart (Japan) ===
Chart	Peak position	First-day/week sales	Sales total
Oricon Daily Charts	1	35,136 (First-day)	100,244
Oricon Weekly Charts	1	76,144	100,244
