= Garden of Eden (disambiguation) =

The Garden of Eden is the Biblical garden where Adam and Eve lived.

Garden of Eden may also refer to:

== Literature ==
- The Garden of Eden (novel), a novel by Ernest Hemingway
- "The Garden of Eden", short story by Rudyard Kipling in Soldiers Three (1888)

== Films ==
- The Garden of Eden (1928 film), a silent movie
- Garden of Eden (1954 film), a drama nudist film
- The Garden of Eden (1984 film), a documentary
- The Garden of Eden (1998 film), a drama film
- The Garden of Eden (2008 film), adaptation of the Hemingway novel

== Music ==
- Garden of Eden (album), a 2006 album by Paul Motian
- "The Garden of Eden" (song), a 1956 popular song by Dennise Haas Norwood, a hit for Frankie Vaughan among others
- "Garden of Eden" (Guns N' Roses song), 1991
- "Garden of Eden" (Lady Gaga song), 2025
- "Garden of Eden" (Natasha Hamilton song), 2026
- Garden of Eden, a 1978 album by Passport
- The Garden of Eden, a 1988 album by a British band of the same name, fronted by Angela McCluskey
- "Garden of Eden", a song by New Riders of the Purple Sage from New Riders of the Purple Sage, 1971
- "Garden of Eden", a song by Ratt from Infestation, 2010
- "Garden of Eden", a song by Rob Cantor from Not A Trampoline, 2014
- "The Garden of Eden", a song by Weezer from the 2022 EP SZNZ: Spring

== Painting and sculpture ==
- The Garden of Eden, painting by Thomas Cole
- Garden of Eden (Lucas, Kansas), a house and concrete sculpture garden in Lucas, Kansas constructed by Samuel P. Dinsmoor, listed on the U.S. National Register of Historic Places

== Other uses ==
- Garden of Eden, Illinois
- Garden of Eden (cellular automaton), a configuration that cannot be reached from any other configuration
- Garden of Eden (Venice), a villa and garden on the island of Giudecca, Venice, Italy
- Garden of Eden, Nova Scotia, a community in Pictou County, Nova Scotia, Canada
- Garden of Eden, a waterhole in Kings Canyon (Northern Territory), Australia
- Garden of Eden Ice Plateau, a glacier and ice field in New Zealand
- Eden Gardens State Park, a state park in Florida, United States
- Eden Gardens, a cricket ground in Kolkata, India
- Eden Garden, a garden in Auckland, New Zealand
- Eden Park, a rugby stadium in Auckland, New Zealand nicknamed Garden of Eden

== See also ==
- Eden (disambiguation)
- The Garden of Earthly Delights, painting by Hieronymus Bosch
- Expulsion from the Garden of Eden, painting by Masaccio
- "In-A-Gadda-Da-Vida", a slurred variant of "In the Garden of Eden"
- "Gates of Eden", a song by Bob Dylan
- Garden of Eatin', snack food produced by Hain Celestial Group
