= Eden (Faun album) =

- Cover artwork by Brian Froud

Studio album by Faun
- Released: 2011
- Genre: Celtic folk, folk rock
- Label: Banshee

Faun chronology
Buch der Balladen (2009)	Eden (2011)	Von den Elben (2013)

Eden is a concept album released in 2011 by the German band Faun. It was the only album to feature member Rairda.

== Lyrics and Concept ==
The album covers many different topics such as Greek mythology, including "Hymn to Pan" about the Greek god of the same name. Other songs deal with other mythologies: The lyrics of "Arcadia" are from an ancient Finnish poem honoring the forest-god. "Lvpercalia" is about the ancient Roman festival, "Iduna" is about the Norse deity, and "Adam Lay Ybounden" and "Golden Apples" both concern the biblical narrative of the Garden of Eden.

Some songs are adaptations of older songs and melodies. "The Butterfly" is an old Irish melody, "Oyneng Yar" is a Tatar song, "Polska Från Larsson" is an old Swedish folk melody and "Ynis Avalach" is an old Celtic melody.

"Zeitgeist" stands out because it deals with the conflict between nature and modern society and not paganism directly. "The Market Song" is about the fairs and markets that have been arranged through the centuries and function as meeting places where cultures meet and ideas flow and is dedicated to the arrangers of Faerieworlds, Castlefest, Festival Mediaval, Wave-Gotik-Treffen and Mittelalterlich Spectaculum. The song incorporates elements from the traditional English song "Copshawholme Fair".

The songs are heavily elaborated in the album sleeve where every song has accompanying lyrics, notes and imagery. The graphics for the sleeve and booklet were produced by English fantasy illustrator Brian Froud. Some songs are referenced with poetry: Heinrich von Kleist in "Zeitgeist", Kenneth Grahame in "Hymn to Pan", Joseph Conrad and Ingeborg Bachmann in "Pearl", excerpts from the Edda in "Polska Från Larsson" and finally Sir Arthur Eddington and Rumi in "Golden Apples".

== Track listing ==
No.	Title	Length
1.	"Lupercalia"	3:15
2.	"Zeitgeist"	4:02
3.	"Iduna"	3:21
4.	"The Butterfly"	1:33
5.	"Adam Lay Ybounden"	4:36
6.	"Hymn to Pan"	6:56
7.	"Pearl"	5:04
8.	"Oyneng Yar"	5:33
9.	"Polska Fran Larsson"	4:37
10.	"Alba"	7:17
11.	"Ynis Avalach"	5:08
12.	"Arcadia"	7:16
13.	"The Market Song"	5:50
14.	"Golden Apples"	7:34
