= Aissa Edon =

Malian midwife

Aissa Edon (born 1981 or 1982 (age 43–44)) is a Malian midwife living in London and an activist against female genital mutilation (FGM). She has worked with victims of FGM in Switzerland, France, Belgium and the UK since 2016. In 2014 she established a foundation, The Hope Clinic, which raises awareness about FGM and helps women who have experienced it. In 2016, she was awarded a Mary Seacole Scholar Award by the Royal College of Nursing, and took part in 2015 was one of the BBC's 100 Women.

Edon was a victim of female genital mutilation at 6 years of age, and speaks of her violent experience publicly. Adopted by a French family, she was able to receive care for the complications she experienced, including psychological problems, urinary tract infections, and chronic pain.
