= Von den Elben =

Studio album by Faun
- Released: 25 January 2013
- Genre: Medieval folk rock
- Label: Universal, Polydor
- Producer: Valicon Entertainment

Faun chronology
Eden (2011)	Von den Elben (2013)	Luna (2014)

Von den Elben is the seventh studio album by the German medieval folk band Faun. It was released on 25 January 2013. Among new original content it contains a number of cover versions of old Faun tracks and songs by other artists. After signing a contract with the Universal label and the Valicon production team, Faun for the first time released an album with lyrics completely in German language. It is the first album to feature members Stephan Groth and Katja Moslehner. The album features duets with two other German bands: Santiano and Subway to Sally. Michael Boden from Subway to Sally also contributed the lyrics for tracks like "Warte auf mich" [Wait for Me].

The title track "Von den Elben" [Of the Elves] is a rework of a former Faun release from the album Licht. The previous medieval lyrics by Heinrich von Morungen were replaced by different lyrics in modern German written by Faun mastermind Oliver s. Tyr.

== Reception ==
While Faun fans voiced their concern about the band joining a major commercial label, professional reviewers agreed that the album did not suffer from this step. The MSN reviewer called Von den Elben a "balancing act between authenticity and mass market compatibility", but wrote also that it contained several valuable tracks. The Sonic Seducer stated that fears about Faun losing their originality were baseless.

=== Charts ===
Despite the initial criticism, the album was also a commercial success. It is the first Faun album to reach top ten positions in the album charts of Germany, Austria and Switzerland, and the first album ever to chart in the latter two countries.

Chart	Peak position
German Albums (Offizielle Top 100)	7
Austrian Albums (Ö3 Austria)	9
Swiss Albums (Schweizer Hitparade)	5

=== Nomination ===
With Von den Elben, Faun were nominated for the 2014 ECHO award in the categories 'National Rock/Pop Group' and 'National Newcomer of the Year'.

== Track list ==
No.	Title	Lyrics	Music	Length
1.	"Mit dem Wind [With the Wind]"	Oliver S. Tyr, Stephan Groth	Oliver S. Tyr, Fiona Rüggeberg, Groth, Niel Mitra, Rüdiger Maul, Ingo Politz, Bernd Wendlandt	3:53
2.	"Diese kalte Nacht [This cold Night]"	Oliver S. Tyr,	Traditional, arranged by Oliver S. Tyr, Rüggeberg, Groth, Niel Mitra, Maul, Politz, Wendlandt	3:03
3.	"Von den Elben [Of the Elves]"	Oliver S. Tyr	Oliver S. Tyr, Rüggeberg, Lisa Pawelke, Groth, Niel Mitra, Maul, Politz, Wendlandt	4:07
4.	"Tanz mit mir [Dance with Me]" (feat. Santiano)	Frank Ramond	Hartmut Krech, Mark Nissen	3:02
5.	"Schrei es in die Winde [Shout it into the Wind]" (Inspired by Eluveitie's song "Omnos")	David Stifer, translation by Lukas Hainer, Oliver S. Tyr	Chrigel Glanzmann	4:03
6.	"Wilde Rose [Wild Rose]"	Ramond	Traditional, arranged by Krech and Nissen	3:25
7.	"Wenn wir uns wiedersehen [When we meet again]"	Oliver S. Tyr	Oliver S. Tyr, Rüggeberg, Groth, Niel Mitra, Maul, Politz, Wendlandt	3:19
8.	"Bring mich nach Haus [Bring Me home]"	Lukas Hainer, Henning Kelch, Mario Hansen	Kelch, Hansen, Alex Geringas	3:23
9.	"Welche Sprache spricht dein Herz? [Which Language does Your Heart speak?]"	Simon Michael Schmitt, Michael Boden	Schmitt	3:27
10.	"Andro II"	Instrumental	Oliver S. Tyr, Rüggeberg, Groth, Sonja Drakulich, Pawelke, Niel Mitra, Maul, Politz, Wendlandt	4:59
11.	"Minne Duett [Courtly love duet]" (feat. Subway to Sally)	Boden	Ingo Hampf, Eric Fish	3:39
12.	"Thymian & Rosmarin [Thyme & Rosemary]"	Oliver S. Tyr	Oliver S. Tyr, Rüggeberg, Groth, Politz, Wendlandt	3:48
13.	"Warte auf mich [Wait for Me]"	Boden	Hampf	3:18
