= Cross Ange =

Japanese anime television series and its franchise

- Key visual for the series
- Also known as: Cross Ange: Rondo of Angel and Dragon
- クロスアンジュ 天使と竜の輪舞
- Genre: Drama, mecha
- Created by: Sunrise
- Developed by: Tatsuto Higuchi
- Directed by: Yoshiharu Ashino
- Voices of: Nana Mizuki; Eri Kitamura; Yukari Tamura; Houko Kuwashima; Ami Koshimizu; Kaori Ishihara; Mamoru Miyano; Yui Horie; Sumire Uesaka
- Music by: Akiko Shikata
- Country of origin: Japan
- Original language: Japanese
- No. of episodes: 25 (list of episodes)

Production
- Producer: Yasumasa Tsuchiya; Takahiro Yamanaka; Renta Suzuki
- Cinematography: Tsunetaka Ema
- Animator: Sunrise
- Editor: Kumiko Sakamoto
- Production companies: Sunrise; Project Ange (Note: Label consisting of King Records, Fields Corporation, Sunrise, Namco Bandai Games, Bandai Channel and Namco Bandai Live Creative.)

Original release
- Network: Tokyo MX, MBS, TVA, BS11, AT-X
- Release: October 5, 2014 – March 29, 2015

Related
- Manga
- Written by: Kenjirō Takeshita
- Published by: Kadokawa Shoten
- Imprint: Kadokawa Comics Ace
- Magazine: ComicWalker
- Original run: August 3, 2014 – June 28, 2015
- Volumes: 3
- Manga

Cross Ange: Academy of Angels and Dragons
- Illustrated by: Osaji
- Published by: Kadokawa Shoten
- Imprint: Kadokawa Comics Ace
- Magazine: ComicWalker
- Original run: October 5, 2014 – March 29, 2015
- Volumes: 2
- Video game

Cross Ange: Rondo of Angels and Dragons tr.
- Developer: Shade
- Publisher: Namco Bandai Games
- Genre: Action
- Platform: PlayStation Vita
- Released: JP: May 28, 2015

Cross Ange: Rondo of Angels and Dragons (Japanese: クロスアンジュ 天使と竜の輪舞, Hepburn: Kurosu Anju Tenshi to Ryū no Rondo), also known as simply Cross Ange, is a Japanese mecha anime television series produced by Sunrise that aired from October 2014 to March 2015, accompanied by a parody Yonkoma manga. A manga adaptation was published between August 2014 and June 2015.

Set in a world where magic and technology coexist, the story follows Ange, a royal who was banished from her kingdom due to her inability to use mana, a prospect of the world that dictates everyday life. Forced to join a paramilitary organization for her own survival, she is tasked with piloting a special type of mecha to combat interdimensional creatures known as DRAGONs while simultaneously rebelling against those who betrayed her, all while uncovering dark and horrific secrets about her world.

== Plot ==
Through the development of groundbreaking information transfer and material generation technology called "Mana", various problems, such as pollution and war have disappeared, and days of peace have arrived in the world. However, the people who receive the benefit of the Mana live in a false peace. Those who cannot use the Mana, referred to by the derogatory term "Norma", who are seen as an opposition to the structures of society, live in oppression. Because this is the norm, the people who use Mana do not question it.

The first princess of the Misurugi Empire, Angelise Ikaruga Misurugi, is convinced of the idea of exterminating the Norma. But during her 16th baptism birthday, her elder brother, Julio, publicly exposes her as a Norma out of jealousy. Angelise, bewildered by the revelation that she herself was a Norma all along, becomes hated by the people in the blink of an eye and is exiled to Arzenal, an isolated military base where Norma are conscripted into service against their will to fight interdimensional creatures known as DRAGONs, and starts her new life as the Norma soldier named Ange.

As she struggles to adjust to her new identity, Ange embarks on a personal quest to correct the world she lives in, all while learning there may be a bigger conspiracy involving the DRAGONs, the world she lives in, and mana itself; ultimately confronting the source of all her troubles: a terrible man playing God.

== Media ==
=== Manga ===
A manga adaptation drawn by Kenjirō Takeshita was published between August 3, 2014, and June 28, 2015, on Kadokawa Shoten's ComicWalker website and collected in three volumes.

A light-hearted high-school-themed 4koma parody manga Cross Ange: Academy of Angels and Dragons drawn by Osaji was published on ComicWalker between October 5, 2014, and March 29, 2015. Each strip followed an anime episode. The manga was compiled in two volumes.

=== Anime ===
The anime series is produced by Sunrise and aired between October 5, 2014, and March 29, 2015, on Tokyo MX, MBS, TVA, BS11. The first opening theme is "Kindan no Resistance" (禁断のレジスタンス, Kindan no Rejisutansu; lit. "Forbidden Resistance") by Nana Mizuki, and the first ending theme is "Rinrei" (凛麗; lit. "Cold Beauty") by Eri Kitamura. The second opening theme is "Shinjitsu no Mokushiroku" (真実の黙示録; lit. "Apocalypse of Truth" or "Revelations of Reality") by Yoko Takahashi, and the second ending theme is "Shūmatsu no Love Song" (終末のラブソング, Shūmatsu no Rabu Songu; lit. "Love Song of the End") by Mizuki. The insert song featured in episodes five, nine, and twenty-two is "Necessary" by Mizuki.

The series was licensed by Sentai Filmworks for a digital and home media release in North America. Madman Entertainment (now known as Crunchyroll Store Australia) also licensed the series for streaming in Australia and New Zealand. The series was picked up by Crunchyroll for streaming in North America and other select parts of the world.

In South-East Asia, Animax Asia carried the series.

=== Video games ===
An action shooter game for the PlayStation Vita titled Cross Ange: Rondo of Angels and Dragons tr. was released on May 28, 2015. The player character is Naomi, who died in the original anime series before Ange arrives in Arzenal. The game features multiple endings depending on player choices. Cross Ange was included in the crossover games Super Robot Wars V and Super Robot Wars X.
