= Faun (band) =

German band

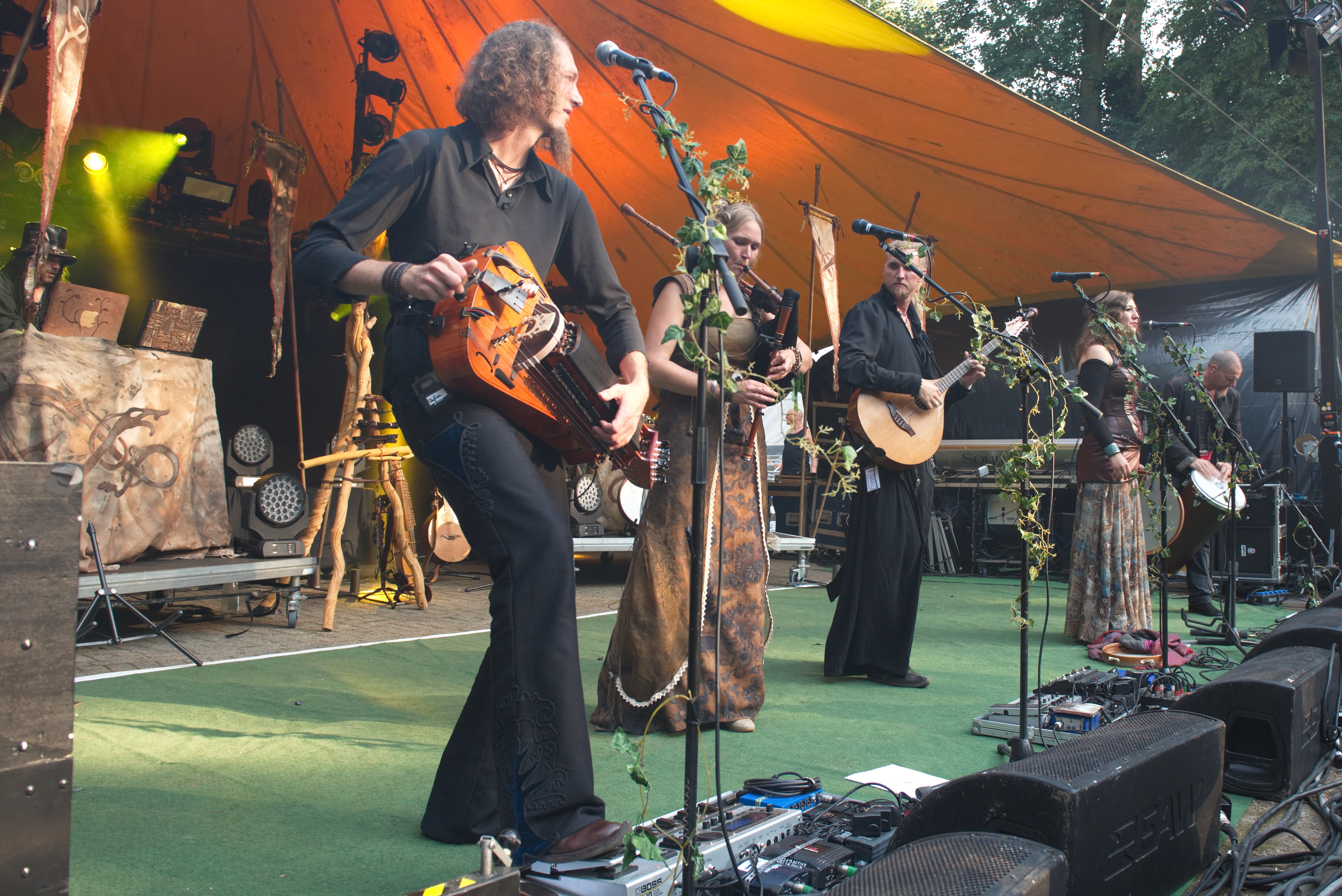
- Faun performing in 2016

Background information
- Genres: Pagan folk; darkwave; Neo-Medieval music; folk rock
- Years active: 1998–present
- Labels: Banshee; Noir; Polydor; Universal Music Germany; Pagan Folk Records
- Members: Oliver s. Tyr; Niel Mitra; Stephan Groth; Laura Fella; Adaya; Alex Schulz (since September 2023)
- Past members: Elisabeth Pawelke; Birgit Muggenthaler; Sandra Elflein; Margareta Aibl ("Rairda"); Sonja Drakulich; Katja Moslehner; Fiona Frewert; Rüdiger Maul
- Website: www.faune.de

Faun is a German band that was formed in 1998 and plays pagan folk, darkwave, and medieval music. The vocals are performed in a variety of languages, including German, English, Latin, Greek, Turkish, Scandinavian and Hungarian. Their instruments include Celtic harp, Swedish nyckelharpa, hurdy-gurdy, bagpipes, cittern and flutes.

== History ==
The band was founded in 1998 by Oliver s. Tyr, Elisabeth Pawelke, Fiona Rüggeberg, and Birgit Muggenthaler. Two years later, Rüdiger Maul joined the band as a percussionist. At the same time, Muggenthaler left the band to join the folk-rock band Schandmaul. In 2002, Faun released their first album Zaubersprüche. Niel Mitra was a guest musician on this album, and later became a full-time member of the band, the only one playing only electronic instruments. In 2003, the band released its second album, Licht, and performed at several festivals.

Elisabeth Pawelke left Faun in 2008 to focus on her studies in classical song in Basel, Switzerland. She was succeeded by Sandra Elflein, who left Faun in April 2010 due to a pregnancy and health issues. Singer and multi-instrumentalist Rairda replaced her but left the band in 2012. She was succeeded by Katja Moslehner.

In 2013, the band toured Europe, including Berlin. Later that year, they released their seventh studio album Von den Elben, which became the first Faun album to reach top ten positions in the album charts of Germany, Austria, and Switzerland, and was also their first album to chart in the latter two countries. It was nominated for the ECHO award in the categories "National Rock/Pop Group" and "National Newcomer of the Year".

On 19 August 2016, the band released their ninth album, Midgard. It quickly reached third place in the German album ranking. The following year, Katja Moslehner left the band. She was replaced by Laura Fella. On 15 November 2019, the band released Märchen & Mythen, their tenth studio album.

In 2020, founding member Fiona Frewert announced her departure from the band. She was replaced by singer-songwriter Adaya.

After five albums released by Universal Music Germany, Faun established their own record label in 2021, Pagan Folk Records. The first album to be released on this label was Faun's Pagan from 2022.

== Style ==
=== Music ===
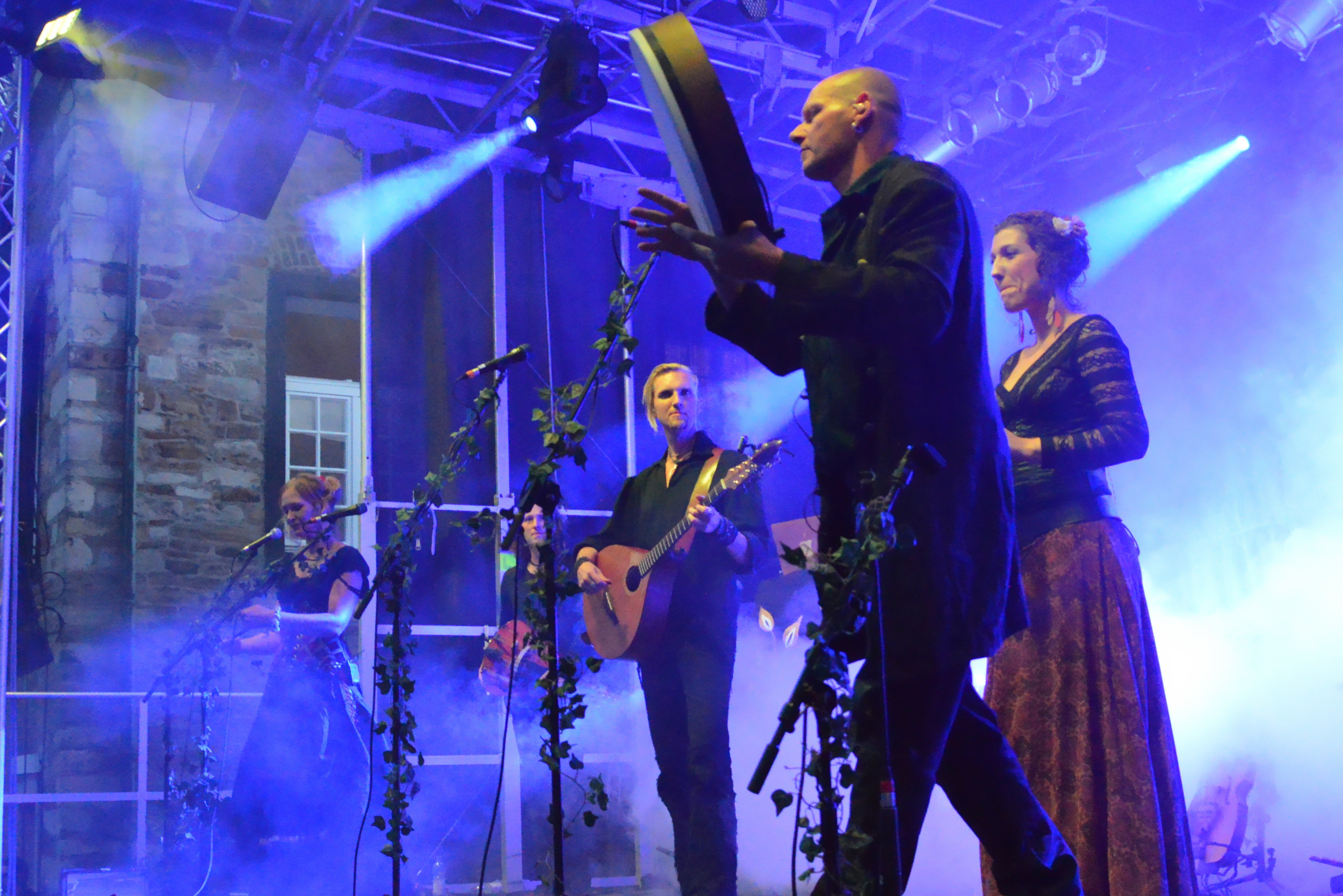
Faun in 2013

Faun is an example of "Mittelalter" music, a German musical style mixing Medieval folk and folk metal. The band coined the term "Pagan Folk", initially to describe their electronically amplified concerts, and later their music itself. The Münchner Merkur defines it as "a sometimes experimental mix of folk elements, medieval and traditional music from different epochs and regions as well as modern, even electronic influences".

Faun's repertoire ranges from melancholic ballads to exuberant dances like the Breton an dro. They set historical tunes from various periods and regions to music, as well as composing their own songs.

Faun combines ancient Perso-Arab melodies with the Swedish nyckelharpa and Middle High German lyrics. Mitra has described the essence of the band as a form of "musical alchemy", due to the different musical interests of the members and how they are combined in Faun's music.

The debut album Zaubersprüche mainly contains slow ballads from the era between the Late Middle Ages and Romanticism. The instrumentation is kept entirely acoustic. The second album features far fewer ballads, and includes considerably more danceable tunes like "Andro", "Unda" or the double song "Deva/Punagra".

=== Lyrics ===
Faun's lyrics are in languages including Standard German, Middle High German, Old Icelandic, Low German, Old Norse, Latin, Hungarian, Finnish, and Ladino. Among lyrics of their own, the group uses or writes lyrics inspired by classical texts such as the Carmina Burana ("Satyros", "Renaissance"), the Cantigas de Santa Maria ("Da que Deus", "Renaissance"), Jenaer Liederhandschrift from Vitslav III, Prince of Rügen ("Loibere Risen", "Renaissance"), Egil's Saga ("Licht"), the Poetic Edda ("Sigurdlied", "Buch der Balladen"), Heinrich von Morungen ("Von den Elben", "Licht"), the ballad King Henry, as well as from romantic and modern authors such as John Keats ("Der Wilde Wasermann", "Buch der Balladen"), Baron Munchausen ("2 Falken", "Totem" and "Jahrtausendalt", "Buch der Balladen"), José Melchor Gomis ("Tinta", "Totem"), Joseph Freiherr von Eichendorff ("Der stille Grund", "Totem"), Felicitas Kukuck ("Tanz über die Brücke", Buch der Balladen") and others.

Faun seek to promote a form of paganism they characterise as nature religion. They have stressed that many Christian traditions have a pagan origin or pagan components. Oliver s. Tyr has said that he is opposed to the church, but regards Christianity as a good religion and thinks it is better to be a Christian than to have no faith at all.

=== Meaning of the name ===
The band's logo

The name Faun comes from ancient Greek-Roman mythology, where it equals the herders' deity Faunus or Pan. According to the band, this figure, which is often also depicted as a natural or forestal spirit, expresses the members' connection with nature. For the same reason Oliver Pade's pseudonym is the Satyr, who is closely related to Faunus.

== Members ==
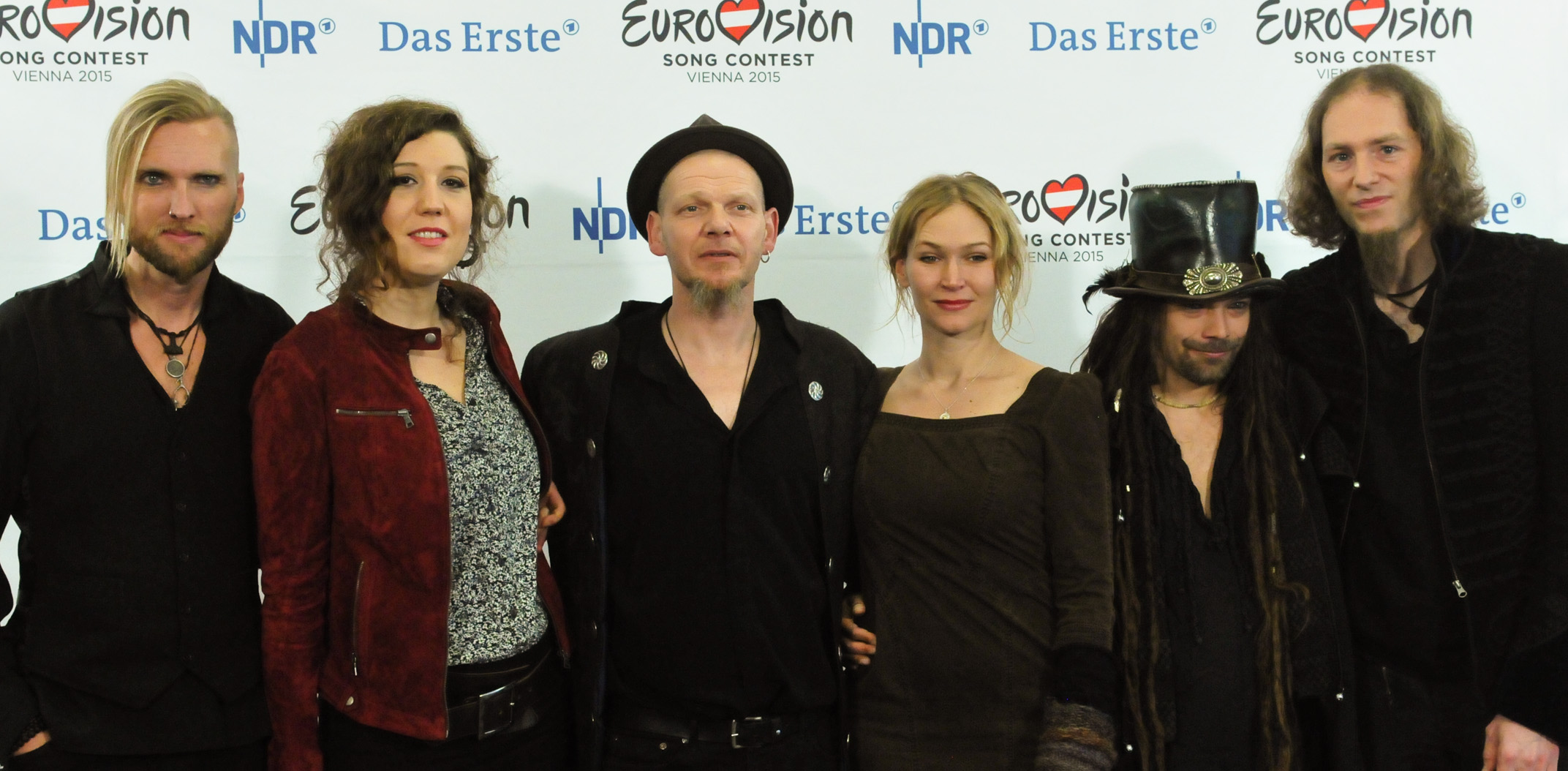
Faun during a press conference for Unser Song für Österreich (2015). From left to right: Oliver s. Tyr, Katja Moslehner, Rüdiger Maul, Fiona Frewert, Niel Mitra and Stephan Groth.

- Oliver s. Tyr – vocals, bouzouki, nyckelharpa, Celtic harp, jaw harp
- Niel Mitra – sequencer, sampler, synthesizer, FL Studio, Buzz, Logic Pro, TASCAM us 224, boss dr 202, Korg Alpha, granular synthesis, folder synthesis, feedbacks, sounds taken from nature and everyday life
- Stephan Groth – vocals, hurdy-gurdy, flutes, cittern (2012–present)
- Laura Fella – vocals, Framedrum, Mandola (2017–present)
- Adaya – vocals, bagpipes, flutes, pandora, celtic harp, bouzouki (2020–present)

=== Former members ===
- Elisabeth Pawelke – vocals, hurdy-gurdy (2001–2008)
- Birgit Muggenthaler – whistles, bagpipes, shawm, vocals (1998–2000)
- Sandra Elflein – vocals, violin, hurdy-gurdy (2008–2010)
- Rairda – vocals, harp, flutes, percussion instruments, hurdy-gurdy (2010–2012)
- Sonja Drakulich – vocals, dulcimer, percussion instruments (2012–2013)
- Katja Moslehner – vocals, percussion instruments (2013–2017)
- Fiona Frewert (born Rüggeberg) – vocals, recorders, whistles, bagpipes, seljefloyte (2000–2020)
- Rüdiger Maul – tar, riq, davul, panriqello, darabukka, timbau, gaxixi and many other percussion instruments (2003–2023)

== Discography ==
=== Studio albums ===
Year	Title	Peak chart positions			
Year	Title	GER	AUT	NED	SWI
2002	Zaubersprüche	97	—	—	—
2003	Licht	85	—	—	—
2005	Renaissance	79	—	—	—
2007	Totem	76	—	—	—
2009	Buch der Balladen	25	—	—	—
2011	Eden	13	16	19	11
2013	Von den Elben	7	9	8	5
2014	Luna	4	20	90	12
2016	Midgard	3	14	94	9
2018	XV – Best Of	12	—	—	45
2019	Märchen & Mythen	6	59	—	27
2022	Pagan	3	28	—	48
2025	Hex	12	—	—	—

— denotes an album that did not chart

The band feature as guest musicians on several tracks of the 2009 Mediæval Bæbes album Illumination, and on Kati Rán's 2024 album SÁLA.

=== Live albums ===
- FAUN & The Pagan Folk Festival – Live feat. Sieben & In Gowan Ring (2008)

=== DVD ===
- Lichtbilder (DVD, 2004)
- Ornament (DVD, 2008)
