= Edon, Vladimir Oblast =

Edon Эдон
- Village
- Location within Vladimir Oblast Location within Russia
- Coordinates: 56°05′N 41°45′E
- Country: Russia
- Region: Vladimir Oblast
- District: Vyaznikovsky District
- Time zone: UTC+3:00

Edon (Russian: Эдон) is a rural locality (a village) in Styopantsevskoye Rural Settlement, Vyaznikovsky District, Vladimir Oblast, Russia. The population was 650 as of 2010. There are 11 streets.

== Geography ==
Edon is located 42 km southwest of Vyazniki (the district's administrative centre) by road. Kitovo is the nearest rural locality.
