= Eden (Nana Mizuki song) =

Single by Nana Mizuki
- B-side: No Limit; Shūmatsu no Love Song; Necessary
- Released: January 14, 2015
- Recorded: 2014
- Genre: Pop
- Label: King Records
- Composer: Shinichi Fujimori
- Lyricist: Nana Mizuki

Nana Mizuki singles chronology
| "Kindan no Resistance" (2014) | "Eden" (2015) | "Angel Blossom" (2015) |

Music video
- "Eden" on YouTube

"Eden" (エデン, Eden) is the 31st single by Japanese singer and voice actress Nana Mizuki, released on January 14, 2015 by King Records.

The full version MV wasn't released on YouTube; instead, it was included on Nana Clips 7.

== Track listing ==
1. "Eden" (エデン)
  - Lyrics: Nana Mizuki
  - Composition: Shinichi Fujimori (Aobozu)
  - Arrangement: Hitoshi Fujima (Elements Garden)
  - Theme song (January Edition) for NTV Show Freshen Up! (スッキリ！！)
  - Theme song for animelo mix TV commercial
2. "No Limit"
  - Lyrics: Nana Mizuki
  - Composition: Jun Suyama
  - Arrangement: Jun Suyama
  - Opening Theme for anime television series Dog Days″
3. "Shūmatsu no Love Song" (終末のラブソング, Love Song of the End)
  - Lyrics: Nana Mizuki
  - Composition: Eriko Yoshiki
  - Arrangement: Hitoshi Fujima (Elements Garden)
  - 2nd Ending Theme for anime television series Cross Ange: Rondo of Angels and Dragons
4. "Necessary"
  - Lyrics: Goro Matsui
  - Composition: Zetta
  - Arrangement: EFFY
  - Insert song for anime television series Cross Ange: Rondo of Angels and Dragons

== Charts ==
Oricon Sales Chart (Japan)

| Chart | Peak position | First day/Week sales |
|---|---|---|
| Oricon Daily Charts | 3 | 13,157 |
| Oricon Weekly Charts | 2 | |
