= Eden Valley, New York =

Hamlet in New York, United States

Coordinates: 42°40′44″N 78°52′19″W

Eden Valley is a hamlet in the town of Eden in Erie County, New York, United States.

Eden Valley has several businesses, including an alpaca ranch, golf course, vegetable farms, and the web based start-up MTGExchange by local resident Thomas Bidney.
