= Eden Valley (Nevada) =

Valley in Nevada, United States

Coordinates: 39°09′00″N 118°18′03″W

Eden Valley is a valley in the U.S. state of Nevada.

Eden Valley was named from its spring-fed idyllic setting relative to the arid surroundings.
