= Eden Corn Festival =

Coordinates: 42.662240°N 78.888037°W

The Eden Corn Festival is a small fair held in the agriculture-based town of Eden. Eden is located in Erie County, New York, and has some of the most fertile and well-drained soils in New York State, allowing farmers to grow over 300 acres (121 ha) of corn annually, and produce more early corn than anyone else in upstate New York. The festival is known as being a convenient place for both local and nearby shop owners to successfully promote products, and attracts people from all over Western New York each year as visitors, program runners and small business owners. It also hosts annual programs like the Run For The Corn, Live In The Beer Barn and more.

== History ==
In 1959, the Eden Chamber of Commerce discussed the idea of holding an annual festival to promote the town. The resulting Garden Festival was held that year, but did not become an annual event. In 1962, the town had a very successful 150th Sesquicentennial celebration. Following the celebration, a man named John Munich brought up the idea to the Chamber of Commerce of a yearly corn festival aimed to make the town money and gain publicity. After further talk and planning, the Chamber President proposed the sweet corn festival in May, 1963, and the Eden Corn Festival was born. The dates were set for Saturday, August 15 and Sunday, August 16, due to this being the time of year that Eden's sweet corn would be most tender. Various committees were set up, and decisions had to be made regarding how big the festival should be, how much money would be required to finance it, and how the money could be raised, since the treasury balance at the time amounted to a mere few hundred dollars. The festival would be held on the grounds of the Newell Faulkner Post of the American Legion on Legion Drive and Route 62, and the committees received help from the American Legion and the Eden School District, who allowed the use of the parking lots on the school grounds and use of their athletic fields. The first corn festival was successful, featuring a carnival, corn judging and auction, a corn queen beauty contest, pet show, tug-of-war, and a parade. Corn was sold for 10 cents an ear, and had to be picked in the dark to keep up with the demand for the 6,000 ears sold. Swimming events, lacrosse and baseball games, square dancing, and a concert provided additional entertainment. It was decided that the Eden Corn Festival would become an annual event, and it has been held every year since 1964.

Early on, the festival was a local event. The concessionaires were local, and Zabel Amusements from Derby provided the rides. In 1966, it was decided to enlarge the festival by having a bigger parade with more prizes. The attendance that year reached 2,500, and eventually, the parade drew marching units and groups from all over the United States and Canada. A man named Bill Edwards became the Chairman of the Eden Corn Festival in 1974, an since then, it has become a four-day event. On August 2, 1978, a Guinness Book World Record category for the most ears of corn eaten in five minutes was established, when Luis Pirada of Eden devoured 18 ears. Attendance this year reached 75,000, and by 1980, the project outgrew the Chamber's capabilities and they turned sponsorship over to the newly formed Eden Corn Festival, Inc., which consisted of members from various organizations in the town. Over the years, the physical ground of the festival was expanded, and by 1988 the Eden Volunteer Fire Department, which to this day sponsors the corn and french fry booths, was selling 45,000 ears of corn. By 1993, the parade had become too big and expensive and was almost canceled. The budget was reduced to $2,000–$3,000, when the cost of the 29th parade a year before had been $96,000. It was decided to scale down from the New York/Pennsylvania Parade and Judging Association's Championship that was filled with bands and floats from all over the Northeast to groups from Eden and Western New York. During this time, a craft show, car show, and talent show were added, along with more rides. The 30th annual corn festival of 1993 had 105,000 in attendance, and has averaged 200,000 people or more ever since. To this day, the Eden Corn Festival is held Thursday through Sunday during the first weekend in August.
