= Eden, New York =

- Town
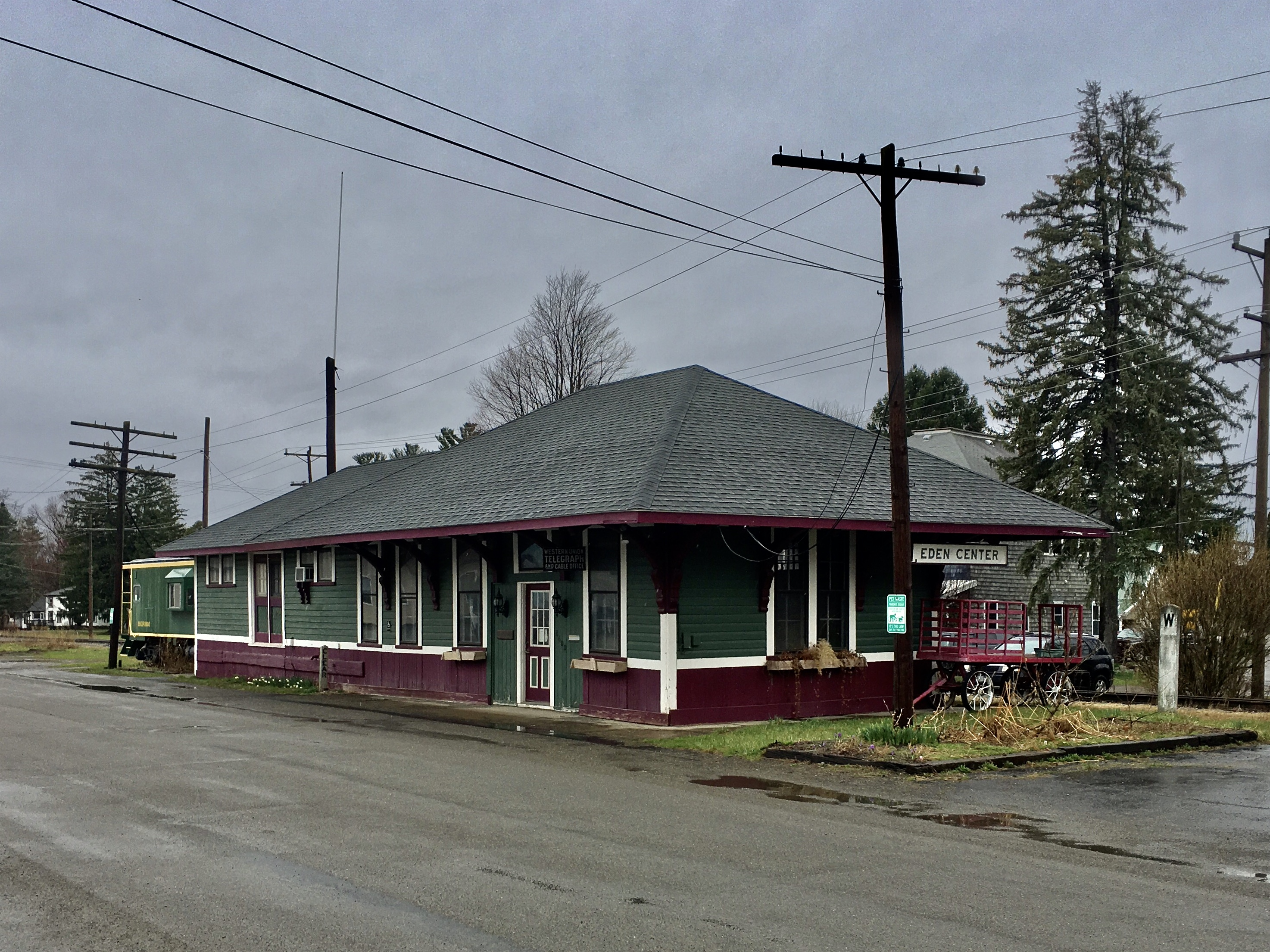
- Eden Center Depot

- Seal
- Nickname: Garden Spot of New York State
- Location in Erie County and New York.

- Location of New York in the United States
- Coordinates: 42°39′09″N 78°53′41″W
- Country: United States
- State: New York
- County: Erie County
- Incorporated: 1812

Government
  - Mayor: Melissa Hartman (D) Town Council: Mary Lou Pew (D); Edward Krycia (D); Vincent Vacco (C); Richard S. Ventry (R)

Area
  - Total: 39.86 sq mi (103.23 km^{2})
  - Land: 39.79 sq mi (103.05 km^{2})
  - Water: 0.069 sq mi (0.18 km^{2})
- Elevation: 984 ft (300 m)

Population (2020)
  - Total: 7,573 ▼
  - Density: 192.3/sq mi (74.25/km^{2})
- Time zone: UTC-5 (EST)
  - Summer (DST): UTC-4 (EDT)
- ZIP Codes: 14057 (Eden); 14047 (Derby); 14075 (Hamburg); 14085 (Lake View)
- Area code: 716
- FIPS code: 36-029-23415
- Website: edenny.gov

Eden is a town in Erie County, New York, United States. The population was 7,688 at the 2010 census.

Eden is one of the interior "Southtowns" of Erie County, lying in the south-central part of the county and to the south of Buffalo.

== History ==
The first settler, Samuel Tubbs, arrived in 1808 along with John Welch, Dr. John March, Levi Bunting and Daniel Webster. The town of Eden was established in 1812 by the partition of the (now defunct) town of Willink. Later, Eden gave up territory to form the towns of Evans and Boston. The town was called "Hill's Corners" until 1822.

A factory in Eden, the Original American Kazoo Company, was established in 1916 and currently remains the only metal Kazoo factory in North America. Located along Route 62, the factory contains a gift shop, as well as a museum that shows its history, and step by step Kazoo assembly.

== Geography ==
According to the U.S. Census Bureau, the town of Eden has a total area of 39.86 square miles (103.24 km^{2}), of which 39.79 square miles (103.06 km^{2}) is land and 0.07 square miles (0.18 km^{2}), or 0.17%, is water.

=== Adjacent cities and towns ===
- Evans: west
- Hamburg: north
- Boston: east
- North Collins: south
- Brant: southwest

=== Major highways ===
- US 62 (Gowanda State Road), a north-south highway that passes through the town from its concurrency with NY 75 from Hamburg town line to the southwest corner of town into North Collins.
- New York State Route 75 (Sisson Highway), the north-south highway through the town from its concurrency with US 62 at the very north of town, south into the town of North Collins.

== Demographics ==
Historical population
| Census | Pop. | Note | %± |
|---|---|---|---|
| 1820 | 1,065 | | — |
| 1830 | 1,066 | | 0.1% |
| 1840 | 2,174 | | 103.9% |
| 1850 | 2,494 | | 14.7% |
| 1860 | 2,439 | | −2.2% |
| 1870 | 2,270 | | −6.9% |
| 1880 | 2,363 | | 4.1% |
| 1890 | 2,288 | | −3.2% |
| 1900 | 2,368 | | 3.5% |
| 1910 | 2,526 | | 6.7% |
| 1920 | 2,352 | | −6.9% |
| 1930 | 2,773 | | 17.9% |
| 1940 | 3,295 | | 18.8% |
| 1950 | 4,201 | | 27.5% |
| 1960 | 6,630 | | 57.8% |
| 1970 | 7,644 | | 15.3% |
| 1980 | 7,327 | | −4.1% |
| 1990 | 7,416 | | 1.2% |
| 2000 | 8,076 | | 8.9% |
| 2010 | 7,688 | | −4.8% |
| 2020 | 7,573 | | −1.5% |
U.S. Decennial Census

As of the census of 2000, there were 8,076 people, 2,855 households, and 2,235 families residing in the town. The population density was 202.8 inhabitants per square mile (78.3/km^{2}). There were 2,995 housing units at an average density of 29.0 persons/km^{2} (75.2 persons/sq mi). The racial makeup of the town was 98.33% White, 0.41% African American, 0.25% Native American, 0.20% Asian, 0.01% Pacific Islander, 0.31% from other races, and 0.50% from two or more races. Of the population 1.03% were Hispanic or Latino of any race.

There were 2,855 households, out of which 37.2% had children under the age of 18 living with them, 67.3% were married couples living together, 7.9% have a woman whose husband does not live with her, and 21.7% were non-families. Of all households, 18.6% were made up of individuals, and 8.4% had someone living alone who was 65 years of age or older. The average household size was 2.76 and the average family size was 3.17.

In the town, the population was spread out, with 26.9% under the age of 18, 6.1% from 18 to 24, 28.3% from 25 to 44, 24.6% from 45 to 64, and 14.2% who were 65 years of age or older. The median age was 39 years. For every 100 females, there were 98.8 males. For every 100 females age 18 and over, there were 95.6 males.

The median income for a household in the town was $54,940, and the median income for a family was $60,640. Males had a median income of $41,405 versus $28,582 for females. The per capita income for the town was $23,060. 2.4% of the population and 1.2% of families were below the poverty line. Out of the total people living in poverty, 1.1% are under the age of 18 and 4.5% are 65 or older.

== Communities and locations in Eden ==
- Clarksburg: A community on NY-75 in the southeast corner of the town.
- Eden: The hamlet of Eden (formerly, "Hills Corners" and "Eden Center"), located on US-62 in the western half of the town.
- East Eden: A location near the eastern town line.
- Eden Valley: A hamlet, formerly called "Tubbs Hollow," located on US-62 near the northern town line.
- Eighteen Mile Creek: A stream with forks near Eden Valley.

The Eden Corn Festival is a small annual festival held in Eden. Festivities usually include a craft show, an auto show, a small assortment of rides, a small parade, and local foods (most of which include some form of corn). There are also baseball and softball tournaments and a tractor pull.

== Notable people ==
- Thomas L. Bunting, former US congressman
- Lewis P. Dayton, former mayor of Buffalo, New York
- Charles S. Desmond, former Chief Judge of the New York Court of Appeals
- Alex Iafallo, Winnipeg Jets forward
- Michael Montes, Composer
- Joe O'Donnell, former NFL player
- Horace V. Redfield, journalist
- Bert Weidner, retired NFL player
- William Wurtenburg, former college football coach, born in Clarksburg

== See also ==
- Eden Corn Festival
