= Eden (CDP), New York =

Eden, New York
- Location in Erie County and the state of New York
- Coordinates: 42°38′58″N 78°53′48″W
- Country: United States
- State: New York
- County: Erie
- Town: Eden

Area
  - Total: 5.59 sq mi (14.49 km^{2})
  - Land: 5.59 sq mi (14.49 km^{2})
  - Water: 0 sq mi (0.00 km^{2})
- Elevation: 820 ft (250 m)

Population (2020)
  - Total: 3,346
  - Density: 598.2/sq mi (230.95/km^{2})
- Time zone: UTC-5 (Eastern (EST))
  - Summer (DST): UTC-4 (EDT)
- ZIP code: 14057
- Area code: 716
- FIPS code: 36-23404
- GNIS feature ID: 0949363
- Website: www.edenny.org

Eden is a hamlet and census-designated place (CDP) in Erie County, New York, United States. The population was 3,516 at the 2010 census. It is part of the Buffalo–Niagara Falls Metropolitan Statistical Area.

Eden is a community in the town of Eden, located on U.S. Route 62 in the western part of the town.

== Geography ==
Eden is located at 42°38′57″N 78°53′48″W (42.649427, -78.896795).

According to the United States Census Bureau, the CDP has a total area of 5.6 square miles (14.6 km^{2}), all land.

== Demographics ==
Historical population
Census	Pop.	Note	%±
2020	3,346		—
U.S. Decennial Census

As of the census of 2000, there were 3,579 people, 1,241 households, and 987 families living in the CDP. The population density was 634.7 inhabitants per square mile (245.1/km^{2}). There were 1,275 housing units at an average density of 226.1 per square mile (87.3/km^{2}). The racial makeup of the CDP was 98.04% White, 0.59% Black or African American, 0.22% Native American, 0.39% Asian, 0.03% Pacific Islander, 0.20% from other races, and 0.53% from two or more races. Hispanic or Latino of any race were 0.50% of the population.

There were 1,241 households, out of which 39.2% had children under the age of 18 living with them, 68.9% were married couples living together, 7.4% had a female householder with no husband present, and 20.4% were non-families. 18.4% of all households were made up of individuals, and 8.6% had someone living alone who was 65 years of age or older. The average household size was 2.82 and the average family size was 3.22.

In the CDP, the population was spread out, with 27.8% under the age of 18, 6.0% from 18 to 24, 29.6% from 25 to 44, 23.8% from 45 to 64, and 12.7% who were 65 years of age or older. The median age was 38 years. For every 100 females, there were 102.4 males. For every 100 females age 18 and over, there were 100.3 males.

The median income for a household in the CDP was $55,659, and the median income for a family was $60,081. Males had a median income of $41,597 versus $27,159 for females. The per capita income for the CDP was $23,579. About 1.3% of families and 3.1% of the population were below the poverty line, including 0.6% of those under age 18 and 4.1% of those age 65 or over.
