= Vitalization (song) =

Single by Nana Mizuki

from the album Supernal Liberty
- B-side: Ai no Hoshi; Dramatic Love
- Released: July 31, 2013
- Recorded: 2013
- Genre: Pop
- Length: 11:55
- Label: King Records

Nana Mizuki singles chronology
"Bright Stream" (2012)	"Vitalization" (2013)	"Kindan no Resistance" (2014)

Music video
- "Vitalization" on YouTube

"Vitalization" is a Japanese-language song and the 29th single by Japanese singer and voice actress Nana Mizuki, released on July 31, 2013 by King Records. The song commences: "Onegai kikasete... Boku wa koko ni iru kara."

== Track listing ==
1. "Vitalization"
  - Lyrics: Nana Mizuki
  - Composition: Noriyasu Agematsu (Elements Garden)
  - Arrangement: Noriyasu Agematsu (Elements Garden), Daisuke Kikuta (Elements Garden)
  - Opening theme for anime television series Senki Zesshō Symphogear G
2. "Ai no Hoshi"
  - Lyrics: Nana Mizuki, Yoshiki Eriko
  - Composition: Yoshiki Eriko
  - Arrangement: Hitoshi Fujima (Elements Garden)
  - Theme song for anime movie Space Battleship Yamato 2199 Chapter 7: Soshite Kan wa Iku
3. "Dramatic Love"
  - Lyrics: Sayuri
  - Composition: Koutapai
  - Arrangement: Shinya Saito
  - Ending theme for Tokyo FM Mizuki Nana M no Sekai

== Charts ==
Oricon Sales Chart (Japan)

Chart	Peak position	First day/Week sales	Sales total
Oricon Daily Charts	1		81,793
Oricon Weekly Charts	3	61,648	81,793
Oricon Yearly Charts	84	81,793	81,793
