= Eden (newspaper) =

English-language newspaper published in Limbe, Cameroon

- Type: Biweekly newspaper
- Editor: Chief Zachee Nzohngandembou
- Language: English
- Headquarters: Limbe, Cameroon
- Website: www.edennewspaper.net

Eden is an English-language newspaper published in Mile II Limbe, Cameroon. It is published by senior journalist Chief Zachee Nzohngandembou under the CERUT (Centre for Rural Transformation) non-governmental organization. Eden was created in 2004 and has since been operating as a bi-weekly newspaper with publications on Mondays and Wednesdays. Its news articles extensively cover the entire national triangle of Cameroon, with stringing reports from other countries in the world.
