= East of Eden =

East of Eden may refer to:

- The biblical location of the Land of Nod, where Cain was exiled
- Duidain, a wilderness mentioned in the Book of Enoch
- A biblical reference to Adam and Eve's exile from the Garden of Eden

== Literature ==
- East of Eden (novel), 1952, by John Steinbeck

== Film and television ==
- East of Eden (film), a 1955 adaptation of the Steinbeck novel
- East of Eden, a 1988 Syrian documentary film by Omar Amiralay
- East of Eden (1981 miniseries), an American TV miniseries adaptation of the Steinbeck novel
- East of Eden (South Korean TV series), a 2008 South Korean drama series
- East of Eden (2026 miniseries), an American TV miniseries adaptation of the Steinbeck novel

== Music ==
=== Songs ===
- "East of Eden" (Big Country song), 1984
- "East of Eden" (Zella Day song), 2014
- "East of Eden", a song by Babyshambles, a B-side of the single "Fuck Forever", 2005
- "East of Eden", a song by Dead Can Dance from Dead Can Dance, 1984
- "East of Eden", a song by Lone Justice from Lone Justice, 1985
- "East of Eden", a song by Mason Jennings from Century Spring, 2002
- "East of Eden", a song by Loathe from The Cold Sun, 2017

=== Other uses in music ===
- East of Eden (British band), a British progressive rock band, or a 1971 album by the band
- East of Eden (Japanese band), a Japanese symphonic rock and metal band
- East of Eden (album), by Taken by Trees, 2009

== See also ==
- "East of Eden, West of Memphis", a song by Spock's Beard from Feel Euphoria
- East of Eden's Gate, a 1982 album by Billy Thorpe
- Eden of the East, a 2009 Japanese anime television series
- Far East of Eden, or Tengai Makyo, a Japanese roleplaying video game series
