= Kindan no Resistance =

Single by Nana Mizuki
- B-side: Blue; Dream Rider
- Released: October 15, 2014
- Recorded: 2014
- Genre: Pop
- Length: 12:03
- Label: King Records
- Songwriter: Nana Mizuki

Nana Mizuki singles chronology
"Vitalization" (2013)	"Kindan no Resistance" (2014)	"Eden" (2015)

Music video
- 水樹奈々『禁断のレジスタンス』MUSIC CLIP（Full Ver.） on YouTube

"Kindan no Resistance" (禁断のレジスタンス, Kindan no Rejisutansu) is the 30th single by Japanese singer and voice actress Nana Mizuki, released on October 15, 2014 by King Records.

== Track listing ==
1. "Kindan no Resistance" (禁断のレジスタンス, Forbidden Resistance)
  - Lyrics: Nana Mizuki
  - Composition: Yusuke Kato
  - Arrangement: Yusuke Kato
  - Opening theme for anime television series Cross Ange: Rondo of Angels and Dragons
2. "Blue"
  - Lyrics: Nana Mizuki
  - Composition: Yoshiki Eriko
  - Arrangement: Hitoshi Fujima (Elements Garden)
  - Theme song for anime movie Space Battleship Yamato 2199: Tsuioku no Kōkai
3. "Dream Rider" (ドリームライダー)
  - Lyrics: Nana Mizuki, Sayuri
  - Composition: Yusuke Kato
  - Arrangement: Jun Suyama

== Charts ==
Oricon Sales Chart (Japan)

Chart	Peak position	First day/Week sales
Oricon Daily Charts	7	
Oricon Weekly Charts	5	40,018
