= Sports in Somalia =

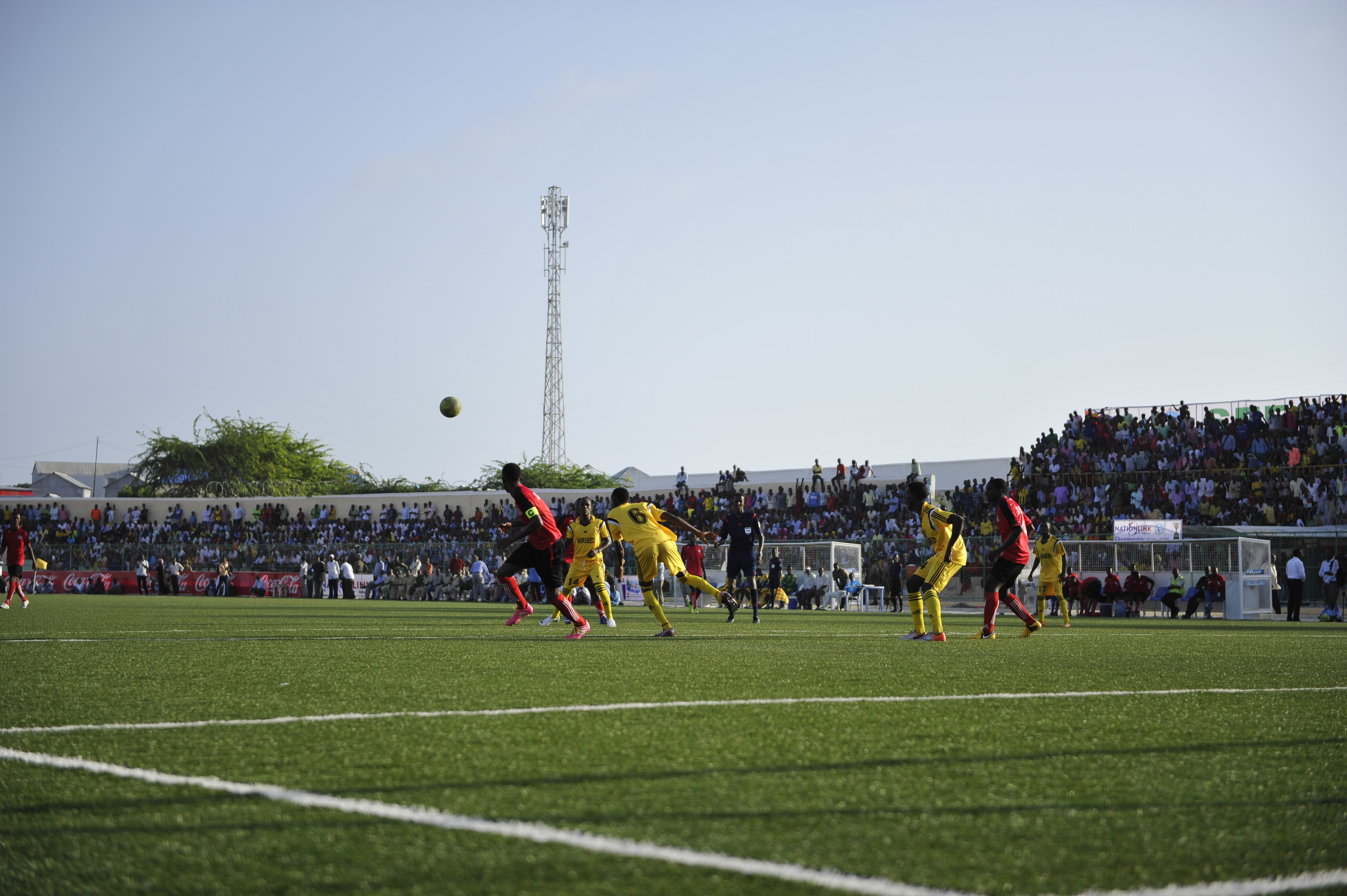
Football game at Banadir Stadium

Sports in Somalia are regulated by the Ministry of Sports of Somalia. The government ministry works closely with the Somali Olympic Committee and various sports governing bodies, including the Somali Football Federation. Abdi Bile from Las Anod is Somalia's most decorated athlete in history; Abdi Bile also holds the highest number of Somali national records. The longest continuously serving national team captains of Somalia's two most popular sports, basketball and football, are Yusuf Qaafow and Hasan Babay respectively.

== History ==
In the late 1920s, Italian authorities began to organize sport in Somalia. The Italian-organized sports were initially concentrated only in the capital Mogadishu and practiced by Italian Somalis.

In 1931 governor Maurizio Rava created the Federazione Sportiva della Somalia, which organized competences of athletics, tennis and football and promoted the first sport activities among the young native population. In 1933 the first Somali football championship was created, called Coppa Federazione Sportiva, with three teams ("Societa' Mogadiscio", "Marina" and "Milizia") from the capital. In 1938 the football championship was won by the "Amaruini" team, made up mainly of local Somalis; in 1939 the winning team was the "Araba".

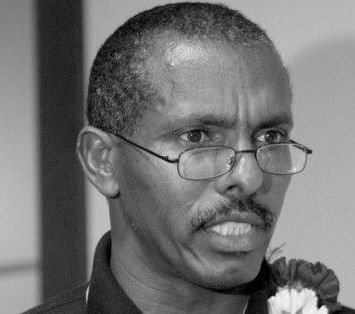
Abdi Bile, Somalia's most decorated athlete and holder of the most national records.

In 1938 competitions of other sports, like swimming, basketball, athletics and cycling, were held: the boxing was practiced by Ballin Nur and Isac Barrachi, two Somalis champions with international fame. In 1938 Mogadishu's first auto race (the "Circuito di Mogadiscio") was held.

After World War II, motorcycle races were held in Mogadishu: the "Circuito Mogadiscio" was done only with motorcycles races and was called Gran Premio Motociclistico della Somalia (GP Motorcycle of Somalia). It was celebrated from 1950 until 1954, when the Italian government obtained the "Somalia Trusteeship" from the ONU. The race was held on the coastal streets of Mogadiscio, near the port and on "Lungomare Corni", and was more than one mile long.

In 1956 the first stadium in Somalia was built by the Italian National Olympic Committee: the Banadir Stadium in Mogadishu. In 2008, BBC Somali correspondent Maxamed Xaaji Xuseen described Abdi Bile as "yahay ciyaartoyda ugu caansan ee soo marta taariikhda Soomaaliya", which roughly translates as Abdi Bile is Somalia's most famous athlete in history, or Abdi Bile is the greatest athlete in Somalia's history. The Somalist scholar Cabdiraxmaan Cismaan Aw Aadan, in his 2014 list of 100 most notable Somalis, listed Abdi Bile as the greatest Somali athlete in general.

== Football ==
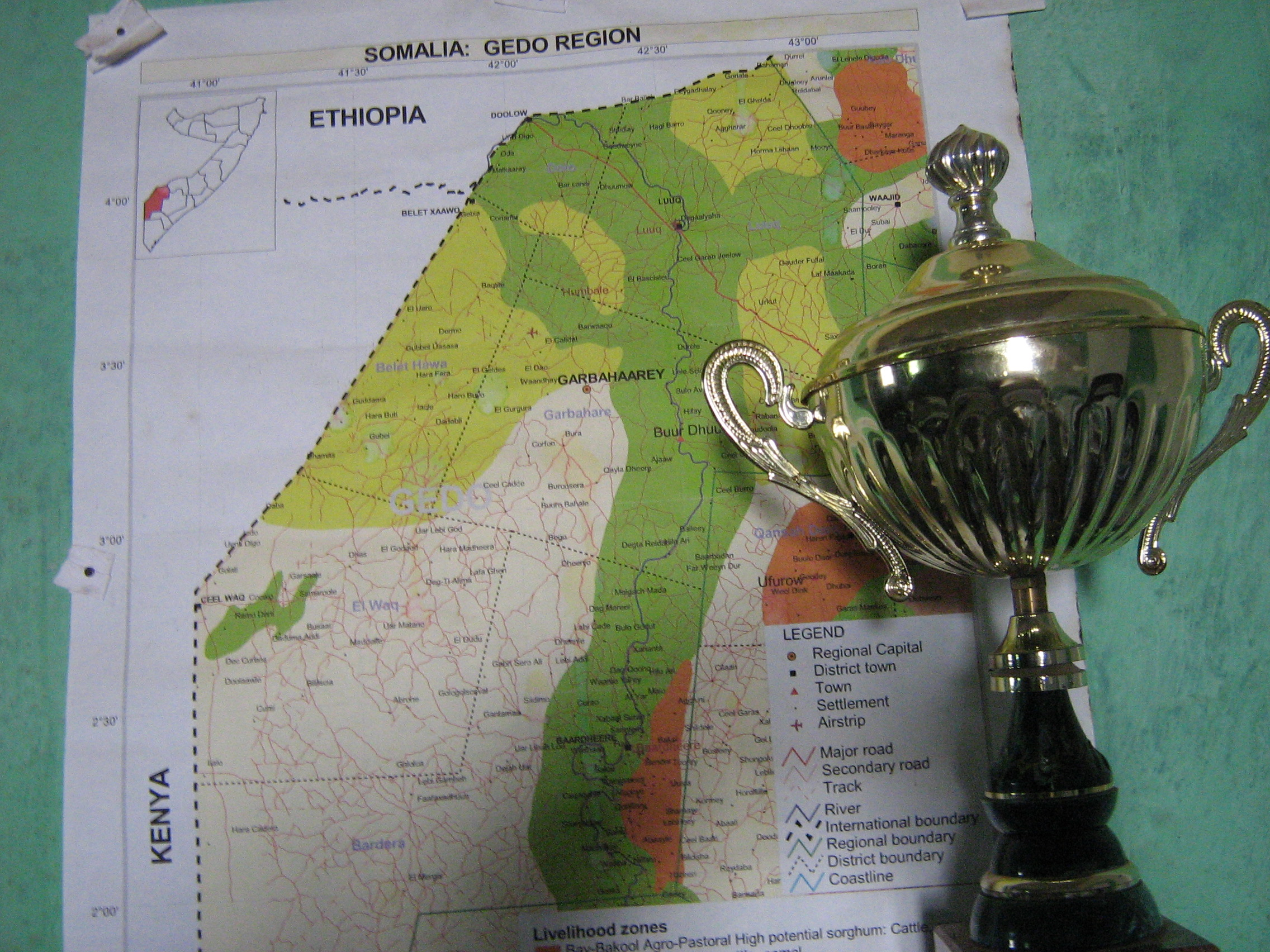
Gedo province football trophy.

Football is the most popular sport amongst Somalis. The first football teams in Somalia were established in the 1930s by the Italian colonial authorities. The competitions were basic in structure, and were associated with the anti-colonial movement after WW2. The Somali Youth League (SYL), the nation's first political party, had put together a team of local youth to play against the Italian expatriate teams.

In 1955 -during the Trust Territory of Somalia under Italian administration- was created the first football stadium in Mogadishu: the Coni Stadium, later called Banadir Stadium. The teams that played a Trust Territory of Somalia championship with the stadium inauguration were: "Lavori Publici", "Autoparco", "El Gab", "Sicurezza", "Somali Police FC" and "AS Mogadiscio".

In 1958, the first commissioner for sport in Somalia was also established. The football squad that the SYL had assembled, which would later change its name to Bondhere, won the first several competitions. However, it was not as successful in its early forays against foreign teams. Important countrywide competitions are the Somalia League and Somalia Cup. The Ocean Stars, the national team, is popularly known as the "giant killers" because of its underdog status, and the upsets it has achieved during games against better funded and established teams at continental tournaments. A multi-ethnic squad, Somalia first participated at the Olympic Games in 1972 and has sent athletes to compete in most Summer Olympic Games since then. The equally diverse Somali beach soccer team also represents the country in international beach soccer competitions. In addition, several international footballers such as Mohammed Ahamed Jama, Liban Abdi, Ayub Daud and Abdisalam Ibrahim play in European top leagues. On 17 December 2015, Horseed FC vs Heegan FC became the first association football match to be aired live in Somalia.

== Athletics ==
Abdi Bile, one of the most successful athletes from Somalia, won the 1500 m World Championship in 1987, running the fastest final 800 m of any 1,500 meter race in history. He was a two-time Olympian (1984 and 1996) and dominated the event in the late 1980s. Bile was ranked first in the world at the mile distance in 1989. He was World Cup champion in the 1500 m in 1989 and two-time world Grand Prix final champion. Hussein Ahmed Salah, a Somalia-born former long-distance runner from Djibouti, won a bronze medal in the marathon at the 1988 Summer Olympics. He also won silver medals in this event at the 1987 and 1991 World Championships, as well as the 1985 IAAF World Marathon Cup.

Many Somalia-born athletes have found success in the diaspora. Mohamed Suleiman, who competes for Qatar, achieved the greatest success of his career when he won the bronze medal in the Barcelona Olympics, becoming the first-ever Olympic medallist for Qatar. Throughout his career, Suleiman ran several Asian records over 1500 m and the mile run. He won the gold medal in the 1500 m representing Asia at the 1992 IAAF World Cup. Suleiman ran for Qatar at two further Olympic Games (in 1996 and 2000) and reached the event finals, although he did not make the podium. Suleiman's younger brothers Nasser and Abdulrahman Suleiman have also competed internationally in middle-distance running – Abdulrahman was the 2002 Asian champion for the 1500 m.

Mo Farah holds the European track record for 10,000 metres, the British road record for 10,000 metres, the British indoor record in the 3000 metres, the British track record for 5000 metres and the European indoor record for 5000 metres. In July 2010, Farah won Britain's first-ever men's European gold medal at 10,000 m. He followed this with a gold in the 5000 m at the 2011 World Championships in Athletics, in Daegu, South Korea, becoming the 5th male athlete to complete the long-distance double at the championships and the first British man to do so. Mustafa Mohamed, the Somali-Swedish long-distance runner who mainly competes in the 3000 metres steeplechase. Won gold in the 2006 Nordic Cross Country Championships and at the 1st SPAR European Team Championships in Leiria, Portugal in 2009. He beat the 31-year-old Swedish record in 2007. Abdihakem Abdirahman the Somali-American long-distance runner who specializes in the 10,000 metres, won Gold for this event at the US Olympic Trials in 2008.

== Basketball ==
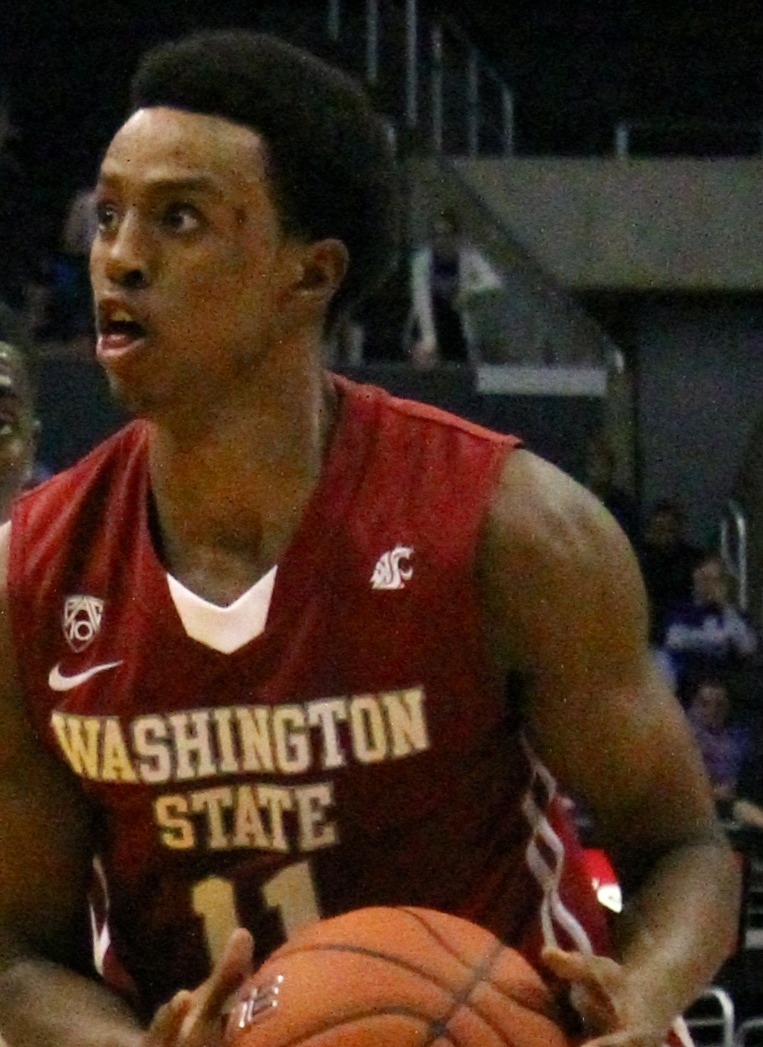
Somalia's Faisal Aden set the scoring record for points in an official match between basketball national teams.

The Somalia national basketball team is a member of the International Basketball Federation (FIBA). Although the squad has yet to pass the qualifications stages for the FIBA World Championship, it won a bronze medal in the 1981 FIBA Africa Championship, when Somalia hosted the tournament. The team also participates in the basketball event at the Pan Arab Games.

In January 2013, national basketball team player Faisal Aden scored 59 points against the Rwanda squad. This remains the global scoring record in an official international FIBA match.

== Bandy ==
In 2013, a Somalia national bandy team was formed in Borlänge, Sweden, by Somali expats. The team later participated in the 2014 Bandy World Championship in Irkutsk and Shelekhov in Russia. Six of the players took part in the Federation of International Bandy's October 2013 camp in ABB Arena, which was open to developing bandy countries. The team has continued to participate in the world championships in 2015, 2016, and 2017.

== Martial arts ==
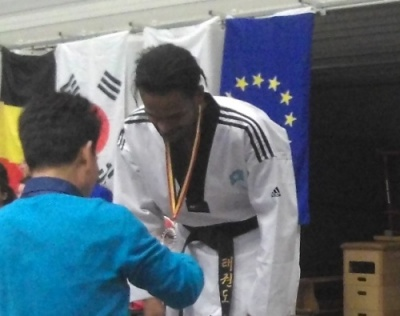
Faisal Jeylani Aweys receiving a taekwondo medal in Belgium.

In the martial arts, the national taekwondo team is controlled by the Somali Karate and Taekwondo Federation. The governing body has been affiliated with the World Taekwondo Federation since 1997, and is based in Mogadishu.

The squad takes part in international, Africa and Arab world taekwondo competitions. At the 2013 Open World Taekwondo Challenge Cup in Tongeren, Belgium, team members Faisal Jeylani Aweys and Mohamed Deq Abdulle took home a silver medal and fourth place, respectively. The Somali Olympic Committee has devised a special support program to ensure continued success in future tournaments.

Additionally, Mohamed Jama has won both world and European titles in K1 and Thai Boxing.

== See also ==
- Somali Olympic Committee
- Football in Somalia

== Bibliography ==
- Del Boca, Angelo and Gabrielli, Gianluca. L’attività sportiva nelle colonie italiane durante il fascismo. Tra organizzazione del consenso, disciplinamento del tempo libero e «prestigio di razza» "I Sentieri della ricerca", rivista di storia contemporanea. Crodo, 2005
- Hess, Robert L. Italian Colonialism in Somalia. University of Chicago P. Chicago, 1966.
- Giuntini, Sergio. Sport e Fascismo. Editore FrancoAngeli. Milano, 2009 ISBN 8856820854
