= Aden (disambiguation) =

Aden is a port city in Yemen.

Aden may also refer to:

== Places ==
=== Arabian Peninsula ===
- Chief Commissioner's Province of Aden or Aden Province, former province of the British Raj
- Aden Colony, successor to Aden Province
- State of Aden, successor to Aden Colony
- Aden Protectorate, former British protectorate
- Aden Governorate, governorate of Yemen that includes the port city
- Gulf of Aden

=== Other ===
- Aden, Alberta
- Aden Country Park, a park in Aberdeenshire, UK
- Aden Crater
- Aden, Illinois
- Aden site, archaeological site in Mississippi, US
- Aden, Virginia

== Ships ==
- SS Aden (1856), a P&O steamship launched in 1856 and hulked in 1875
- SS Aden (1891), a P&O steamship launched in 1891 and wrecked in 1897

== Military ==
- Aden (battle honour), a British Army battle honour
- ADEN cannon, a British-made 30mm cannon used on military aircraft

== Arts, entertainment, and media ==
- Aden (band), an American indie-pop band
- Hazel Aden, a fictional character in Degrassi: The Next Generation

== Other uses ==
- Aden (company), a Southeast Asian e-commerce firm based in Bangkok, Thailand
- Aden (name), common Arabic and Somali name
- Aden pogrom

== See also ==
- Adan (disambiguation)
- Eden (disambiguation)
