= Babay =

Babay may refer to:

- Babay (2014 film)
- Babay (Slavic folklore)
- József Babay
- Hasan Babay
- Babay Luy-e Janan Lu

== See also ==
- Hajji Babay (disambiguation)
- Babayev
