= Aden (name) =

- Pronunciation: /ˈɑːdɛn/ AH-den
- Gender: Male
- Language: Arabic, Somali, Hebrew

Aden (Somali: Aadan, Arabic: عَدَنْ, Hebrew: אדן) is an Arabic, Hebrew male name, used most commonly in Somalia. It can also be a surname.

== Given name ==
- Aden Adde (1908–2007), Somali politician and first president of the Somali Republic
- Aden Isaq Ahmed (born 1923, unknown death date), Somali politician
- Aden Mohamed Ali (born 1939), Somali politician
- Aden Robleh Awaleh, (1941–2014), Djiboutian politician
- Aden Hashi Farah Ayro (died 2008), Somali military commander
- Aden Baldwin (born 1997), English footballer
- Aden Chambers (born 1983), American wrestler
- Aden Charmakeh (born 1984), Djiboutian footballer
- Aden Abdullah Osman Daar (1908–2007), first president of Somalia
- Aden Duale (born 1969), Somali-Kenyan politician
- Aden Durde (born 1980), American football player and coach
- Aden Hashi Farah (died 2008), Somali military commander
- Aden Flint (born 1989), English football defender
- Aden Gillett (born 1958), British actor
- Aden Sh. Hassan, Djiboutian diplomat
- Aden Ibrahim Aw Hirsi (born 1978), Somali politician and author
- Aden Holloway (born 2004), American basketball player
- Aden Kirk (born 1992), English darts player
- Aden Madobe (born 1956), Somali politician
- Aden Meinel (1922–2011), American astronomer
- Aden Abdullahi Nur (died 2002), Somali politician and military general
- Aden Ridgeway (born 1962), Australian politician
- Aden Farah Samatar (born 1943), Djiboutian songwriter, composer, poet, and singer
- Aden Saran-Sor, Somali warlord
- Aden Sugow, Kenyan politician
- Aden Tutton (born 1984), Australian volleyball player
- Aden Young (born 1972), Canadian-Australian actor

=== Fictional characters ===
- Aden Jefferies, a character from the Australian soap opera Home and Away

== Surname ==
- Amal Aden (born 1983), Somali-Norwegian writer
- Faisal Aden (born 1989), Somali basketball player
- Holger Aden (born 1965), German football forward
- Ibrahim Mohamed Aden (born 1972), Somali-American middle-distance runner
- Menno Aden (born 1942), German politician
- Omar Hashi Aden (died 2009), Somali politician
- Sharif Hassan Sheikh Aden (born c. 1946), Somali politician

== Both ==
- Aden Ali Aden (born 1988), Qatari footballer
