= Babayev =

Babayev or Babaev (Azerbaijani: Babayev, Russian: Баба́ев, Turkmen: Babaýew, Ukrainian: Баба́єв) is a Russian, Ukrainian, Turkmen, Uzbek and Azerbaijani masculine surname that is slavicised from Turkic languages; its feminine form is Babayeva or Babaeva. The word babay (бабай) means "grandfather" or "old man" in Tatar and Bashkir. Alternatively, it comes from Arabic word "bab", which means "door". There was a name "Babullah" which meant "doorway of God" or "doorway to heaven". It was very popular among Turkic nations before Soviet times. Grandchildren of "Babs" were sometimes given "Babayev" as a surname. It was initially "Babov", but later it became "Babayev" due to the influence of Russian phonetics. The surname may refer to:

- Alaviyya Babayeva (1921–2014), Azerbaijani prose-writer, translator of contemporary Russian literature, and publicist
- Aleksandr Babayev (1923–1985), flying ace
- Arif Babayev (1928–2025), Azerbaijani film director
- Artour "Arteezy" Babaev (1996–present), Uzbek-Canadian professional Dota 2 player
- Chingiz Babayev (1964–1995) Azerbaijani officer
- Eli Babayev, Israeli football player
- Etibar Babayev (born 1950) Azerbaijani journalist
- Farid Babayev (died 2007), Russian politician
- Firuddin Babayev (1929–1987), Azerbaijani scientist
- Heydar Babayev (born 1957), Azerbaijani politician
- Kasymguly Babaýew (born 1966), Turkmen politician
- Mirza Babayev (1913–2003), Azerbaijani movie actor and singer
- Mukhtar Babayev (born 1967), Azerbaijani politician
- Nanaqiz Babayeva (1922–2003), Azerbaijani cotton grower
- Nazim Babayev (born 1997), Azerbaijani track and field athlete
- Oleh Babayev (1965–2014), Ukrainian politician
- Rafig Babayev (1937–1994), Azerbaijani jazz composer and pianist
- Sabina Babayeva (born 1979), Azerbaijani singer
- Sukhan Babayev (1910–1995), First Secretary of the Communist Party of Turkmenistan in 1951–1958
- Vladlen Babayev (born 1996), Russian football player
- Volodymyr Babayev (1952–2026), Ukrainian scholar and politician

== See also ==
- Babay (disambiguation)
