= Adani =

Adani may refer to:

- Adani (surname)

== Businesses and organisations ==
- Adani Group, an Indian multinational conglomerate
- Adani Enterprises, a holding company
- Adani Energy Solutions, an Indian electricity transmission company
- Adani Wilmar, a multinational food and beverage conglomerate
- Adani Foundation, a charitable foundation
- Adani Green Energy, an Indian renewable energy company
- Adani Ports & SEZ, an Indian port operator
- Adani Power, an Indian power company

== See also ==
- Adan (disambiguation)
