= Adan (surname) =

Adan or Adán is a surname, eventually from the given name Adam (given name). Notable people with the surname include:

Adán

- Alfonso Adán, Spanish politician
- Antonio Adán, Spanish footballer
- José Carlos Adán, Spanish long-distance runner
- José Pérez Adán, Spanish communitarian sociologist
- Martín Adán, Peruvian poet

Adan

- Shukor Adan, Malaysian footballer
- Avraham Adan, Israeli general

== See also ==
- Adani (surname)
