= Asmara circuit =

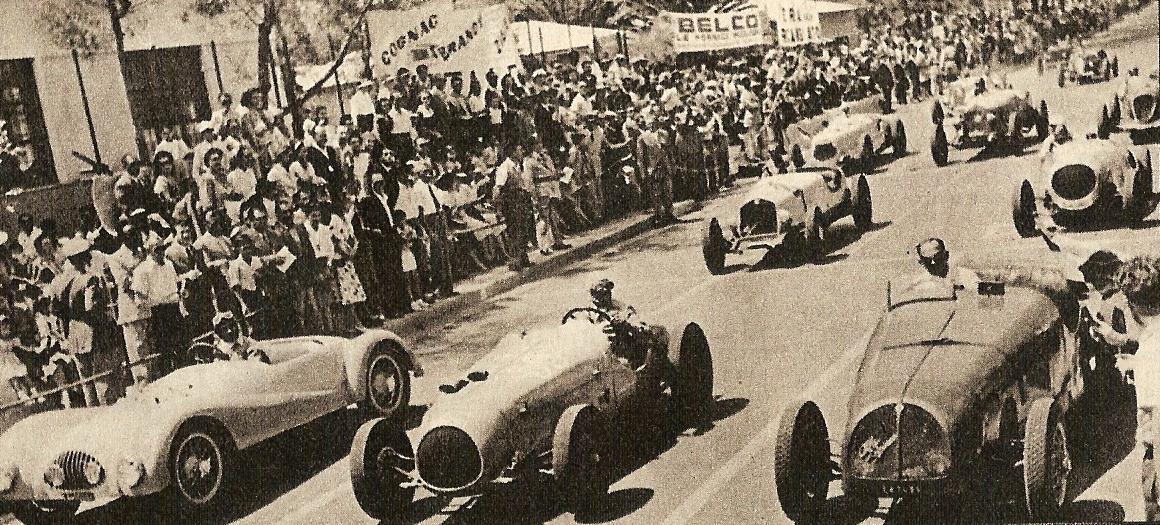
The Circuito Asmara was started in 1938. Photo of the 1950 car race, in the "III Circuito Asmara"

Asmara circuit (in Italian called Circuito Asmara and in English sometimes "Circuit of Asmara") was a car race done in the main streets of Asmara, when it was a colony of the Kingdom of Italy. The Circuito was created in 1938 (88 years ago) Italian Eritrea and was later done -with many interruptions- until 1972 (54 years ago).

== History ==
The Italian government after World War I gave importance to sport activities in the Italian colonies. One of the most followed were those related to car races. Indeed, in Italian Libya was created the famous "Gran Premio di Tripoli", one of the most important in the world during the late 1930s, but even minor car races were done in the other Italian colonies, like the one in Asmara (and later even in Somalia's Mogadiscio).

(The Italians in Asmara) organised an automobile club and started running competitions, one of the first of which was the 26 km Nefasit to Asmara Hillclimb for the "Coppa del Governatore dell’Eritrea" on 23 May 1937. I am sure that there was more competition but the next major event was held on Christmas Day 1938 which attracted two Alfa Romeos from Italy as well as many locals. There were two races for cars up to, and over, 1.5 litres. The former was won by a 4CS Maserati, whilst Romano’s Alfa Romeo 8C2300 Monza won the main event. There were no fewer than fourteen 6C1750 Alfa entered in the race for larger-capacity cars so it is not surprising that an Alfa Romeo agency was opened in Asmara. Simon Moore

So, in Italian Asmara (capital of Eritrea), was done in 1938 the "Primo Circuito di Asmara". It was won by an "Alfa Romeo 8C 2300 Monza" driven by Emilio Romano on the Christmas race called Coppa di Natale. Before there has been a race for smaller cars with less the 1500cc, that was won by a 4CS Maserati and was called Coppa Governatore. In the main race there were 14 Alfa Romeo 1750 and was enthusiastically followed by many thousands of Italians and Eritreans

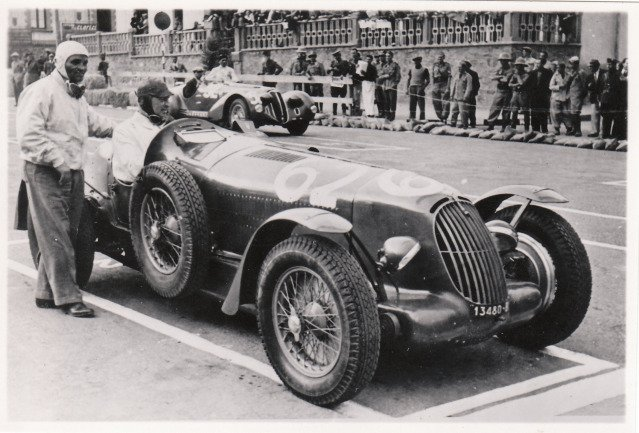
Emilio Romano when he won the first "Coppa di Natale" on 25 December 1938.

The "Primo Circuito di Asmara" was made of two car races, the first being the most important:

- "Coppa di Natale": 1. Emilio Romano (Alfa Romeo 2.8L) (108,810 km - 67,613 mi); 2. Antonio D'Agata (Maserati 2.6L)
- "Coppa del Governatore": 1. Ferdinando Gay (Maserati 1100) in 51’26"2 (72,540 km - 45,075 mi), at 84,891 km/h - 52,750 mph; 2. Cristoforo Bigi (Fiat 508) in 53’22"4

The race was done on the streets of Italian Asmara, with the start in front of the Asmara Opera: it was long nearly 2865 meters on each side of the "Viale Milano" and "Viale Roma" (now called "Sematat avenue") and lasted 40 laps (in Italian called "Giri") for a total of 108 km

== Other years ==
The second "Circuito Asmara" was to be done in December 1939, but the beginning of World War II blocked it. Only in 1948 was done the second and was won by Ettore Salvatori on Maserati, even if it was done with reduced participation of cars.

After the end of the war the circuit was also done in 1950, 1951 and 1952, but was only for local people. The fifth done in 1952 was followed by huge crowds. Later it was done with some interruptions until 1969, with the "Coppa SM Haile Selassie". The last that was done in 1972(when was called "Gran Premio Automobilistico Expo'72") with the presence of emperor Haile Selassie

With the start of the Eritrean Civil Wars related to the struggle for the independence of Eritrea from Ethiopia all the car races were stopped in Asmara. But in the 2010s the car races are again done in Asmara, even if with "local cars".

== See also ==
- Tripoli Grand Prix
- Mogadiscio circuit

== Bibliography ==
- Antonicelli, Franco. Trent'anni di storia italiana 1915 - 1945. Mondadori Editore. Torinop, 1961
- Di Meglio, Rita. Gli Italiani in Eritrea. Italian Embassy in Eritrea. Asmara, 2004.
- Pool, David. (2001-12-01). From Guerrillas to Government: The Eritrean People's Liberation Front. Ohio University Press. ISBN 0-8214-1387-2
