= Adan (given name) =

Adan, Adán
- Gender: Male
- Language: Somali, French, Spanish (Adàn

Adan, spelled Adán in Spanish, is a French, Somali and Spanish masculine given name, the equivalent to Adam.

- Adan Ahmed Elmi (born 1966), the fourth and current Prime Minister of Somaliland
- Adán Amezcua Contreras (born 1969), a leader of the Mexican Colima drug cartel
- Adán Balbín (born 1986), Peruvian footballer
- Adán Cárdenas (1836–1916), Nicaraguan politician and doctor
- Adán Chávez (born 1953), elder brother of Venezuelan president Hugo Chávez
- Adán Godoy (1936–2026), Chilean footballer
- Adán Gurdiel (born 1993), Spanish footballer
- Adán Jodorowsky (born 1979), French actor and musician
- Adan Keynan Wehiye, Kenyan politician
- Adán Martín Menis (1943–2010), former president of the Canary Islands
- Adan Mohamed Nuur Madobe (born 1956), Somali politician and Speaker of Parliament
- Adán Pérez (born 1987), Spanish footballer.
- Adán Sánchez (1984–2004), popular Mexican-American singer
- Adán Vergara (born 1981), Chilean football (soccer) player

== Others use ==
- Adán the Orca, a killer whale at Loro Parque.
- Adan Mose, a fictional character in the 2016 video game Lego Star Wars: The Force Awakens

== See also ==
- Adan (disambiguation)
