= Babı =

- Municipality
- Location within Azerbaijan Location within Karabakh Economic Region
- Coordinates: 39°29′15.9″N 47°22′54.1″E
- Country: Azerbaijan
- District: Fuzuli

Population
  - Total: 1.129
- Time zone: UTC+4 (AZT)

Babı (Babi) is a village and municipality in the Fuzuli District of Azerbaijan. It has a population of 1,129.

== Notable people ==
- Nanaqiz Babayeva (1922–2003), cotton grower
