= Mohamed Sh. Hassan =

His Excellency Mohamed Nuriye محمد شيخ حسن نوريه Maxamad Sheekh Xassan Nuuriye

Ambassador of Somalia to South Africa

Ambassador of Somalia to Nigeria

Ambassador of Somalia to Canada

Ambassador of Somalia to United Arab Republic

Amb. Mohamed Sheikh Hassan or Mohamed Sheikh Hassan Nuriye also referred to as His Excelleny H.E Mohamed Sheikh (Somali: Maxamad Sheekh Xassan ama Maxamad Sheekh Xassan Nuuriye, Arabic: محمد شيخ حسن نوريه ), was a prominent ambassador for Somalia. Mohamed Sheikh Hassan was one of the three ambassadorial brothers from Ethiopia, Djibouti and Somalia, all ethnic Somalis, the other two brothers were Adan Sheikh Hassan and Ismail Sheikh Hassan. All from the same prominent family who were one of the most interesting in the Horn of Africa. The first time in history three Somali brothers managed to become ambassadors in 3 different neighboring countries.

== History ==
Mohamed hails from a prominent family who were one of the most interesting in the Horn of Africa. They are known as the Ambassadorial Brothers. His father Sheikh Hassan Nuriye was a prominent Sheikh in Ethiopia, Djibouti and Somalia. Sheikh Hassan had sired three sons who represented three African countries at ambassadorial level.

Mohamed brothers are Ismail Sheikh Hassan who represented Ethiopia at ambassadorial level and was the Ethiopian ambassador to Libya. His other brother Adan was the Djiboutian ambassador to Oman and the Kingdom of Saudi Arabia.

Mohamed Sheikh Hassan belongs to the Rer Ughaz (Reer Ugaas), Makahiildheere (Makahildere), subsection of the Makahiil (Makahil) branch of the Gadabursi (Gadabuursi). Mohamed served his country as ambassador to United Arab Republic, then Canada and afterwards ambassador to Nigeria and South Africa.

=== Career ===
- Ambassador for United Arab Republic (1969)
- Ambassador for Somalia to Canada
- Director General Foreign Ministry Somalia
- Ambassador for Somalia to Nigeria
- Ambassador for Somalia to South Africa

=== Family tree ===
- Sheikh Hassan Nuriye, Father of all 3 Ambassadors and prominent Sheikh in all 3 countries
- Mohamed Sheikh Hassan - Ambassador for Somalia to United Arab Republic, Canada and Nigeria
- Ismail Sheikh Hassan - Ambassador for Ethiopia to Libya
- Aden Sheikh Hassan - Ambassador for Djibouti to Oman and Saudi Arabia

	Sheikh Hassan Nuriye
Mohamed	Ismail	Aden

Three Somali brothers were citizens of three different countries, working in sensitive posts for three different governments

— Mohamed Osman Omar , The road to zero: Somalia's self-destruction
