= Asmara Theatre =

National theatre in Asmara, Eritrea

Coordinates: 15.3358°N 38.9352°E

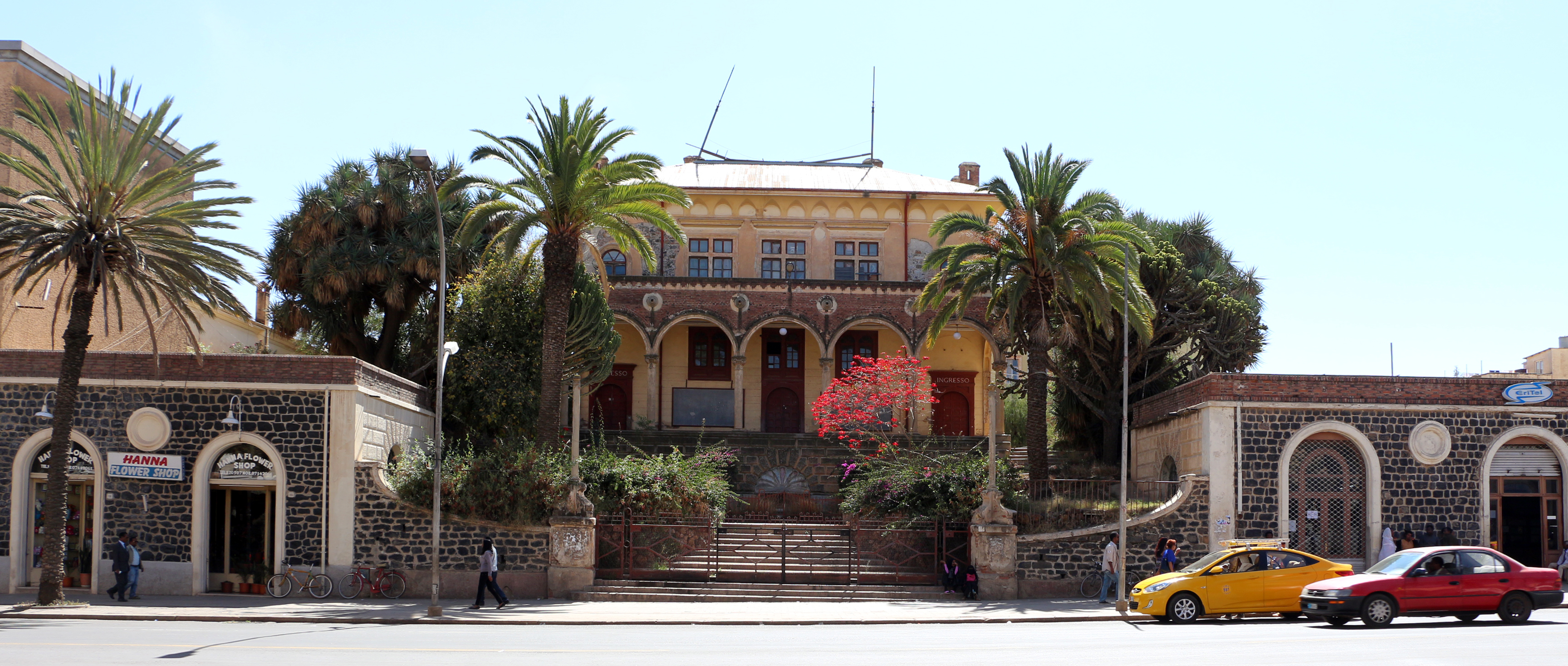
Asmara Theatre building

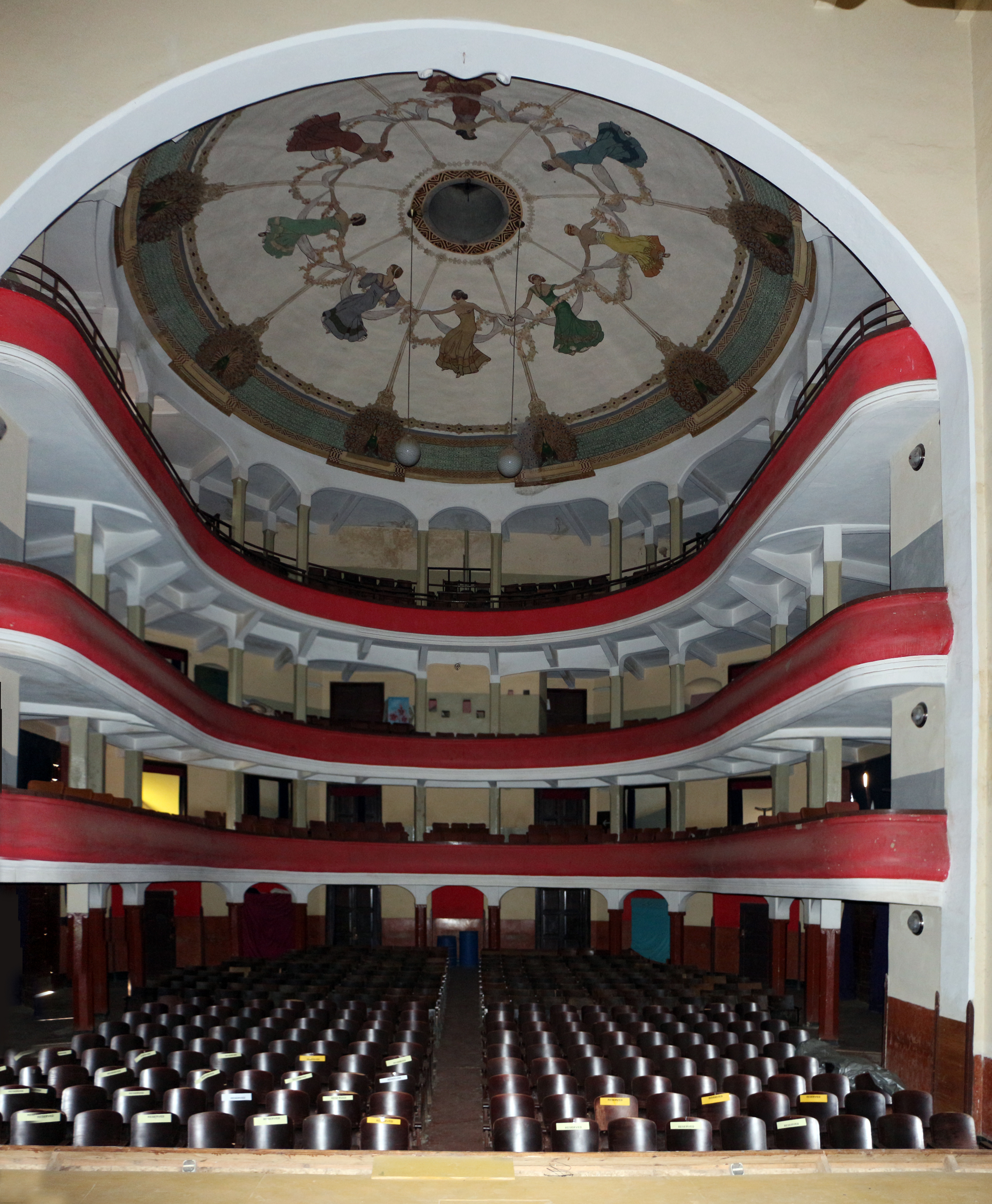
Asmara Theatre interior

Asmara Theatre (Italian: Teatro di Asmara), also known as Asmara Opera, is a theatre in Asmara, Eritrea. It was constructed in 1918 following a design by the Italian engineer Odoardo Cavagnari, with later renovations in 1936.

== Characteristics ==
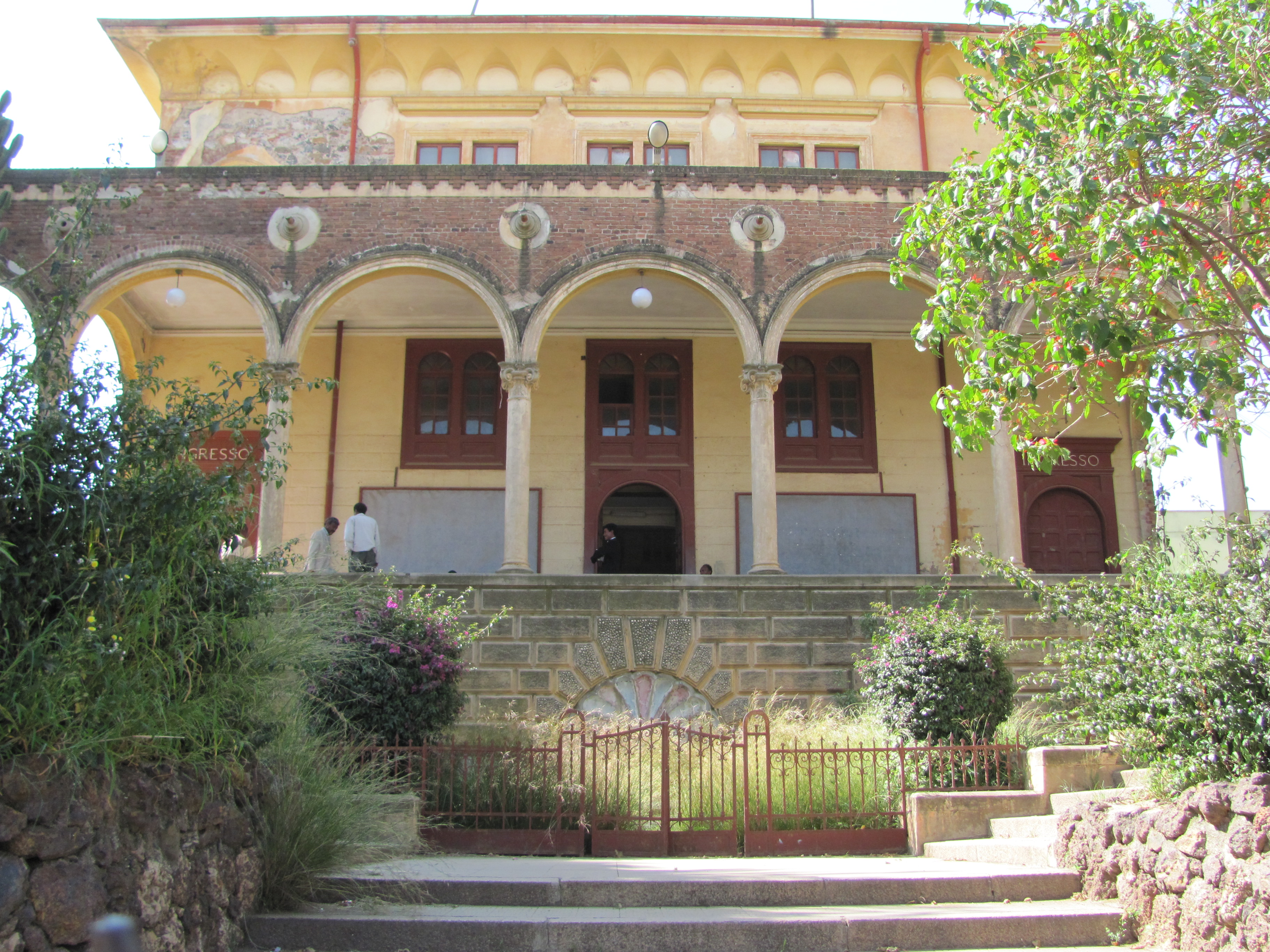
Monumental entrance to Asmara Theatre building

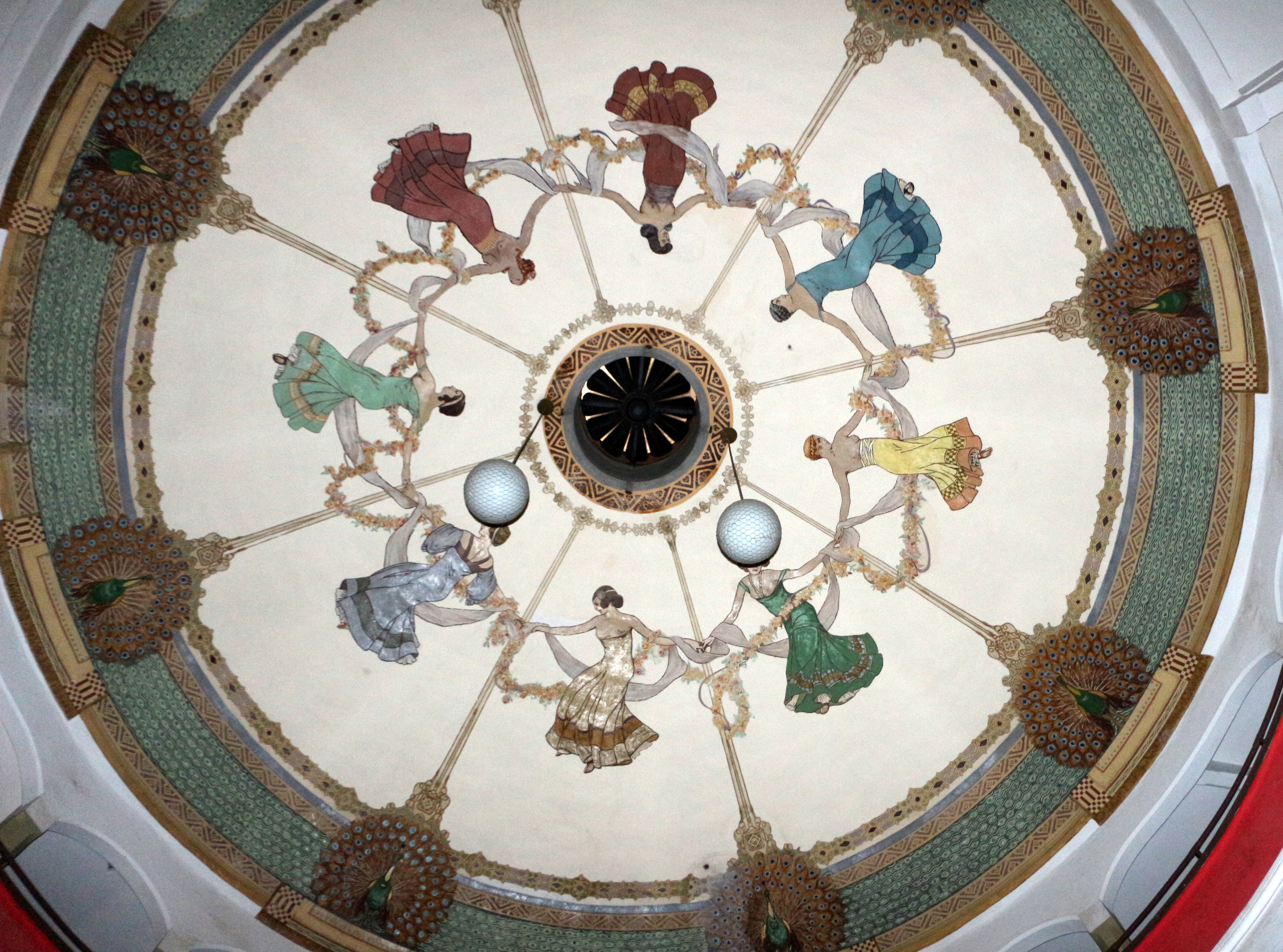
Ceiling of Asmara Theatre

The building combines elements of Romanesque Revival and neoclassicism. The painting of the ceiling of the auditorium shows the tendencies of the Art Nouveau. Indeed, the roof has paintings by Saverio Fresa with dance images. It was one of the most famous buildings in Italian Asmara.

The building was erected on a hillside in Italian Asmara, at the eastern end of the north side of today's Harriet Avenue (the old Corso Italia, later named Corso Mussolini and now the main road of Asmara) and at the corner of Beleza Street. This location made it possible to make the ascent to the Opera as a monumental staircase, which is circled on both sides by a shell-shaped fountain and a Renaissance-style loggia with Corinthian columns. The rest of the exterior of the building, especially the Beleza Street side facing, is castle-like, designed with battlements and towers. From the porch, it is possible to reach the foyer, which in turn gives access to the huge auditorium. This has, in addition to the parquet floor, three additional levels and can have 750 spectators. The stage is relatively small and does not have additional technical equipment.

In 1938 the international car race called the Asmara circuit was started exactly in front of the Opera building, on the Viale Roma (now called Sematat Avenue).

The building was named Teatro Asmara until after being purchased by Eritrea and Ethiopia in 1952 from the Italian owners for far below the market value. After the independence of Eritrea in 1991/93, it was dispossessed and is now state-owned property again. In the foyer, there is now a cafe, and in a side building, the headquarters of the national telephone company Eritel.

In Asmara Theatre were performed many "commedie" and opera works like those of Pirandello and music by Puccini and Verdi, with soprano from the best theatres in Italy: for example, in 1951 was performed "La Patente" of Pirandello and music of Chopin.

After World War II and until the 1970s even international companies performed in the Asmara Theatre with famous "artistic & musical tours", like those of Renato Rascel and Renato Carosone. The theatre was still occasionally used in 2012.

== Bibliography ==
- Jean-Bernard Carillet: Ethiopia & Eritrea. 2009.
- Leonardo Oriolo: Asmara Style. Asmara 1998, S. 149.

== See also ==
- Italian Asmara
- Italian Eritrea
