= Adani (surname) =

Adani is a surname. Notable people with the surname include:

- Abukar Umar Adani, Somalian businessman
- Amos Adani (born 1946), Italian footballer
- Daniele Adani (born 1974), Italian footballer
- David ben Amram Adani (14th-century CE), Yemenite Jewish scholar
- Dror Adani, Israeli criminal
- Gautam Adani (born 1962), Indian businessman
- Laura Adani (1913–1996), Italian actress
- Mariella Adani (born 1934), Italian opera singer
- Priti Adani (born 1965), Indian philanthropist and chairwoman of Adani Foundation, wife of Gautam Adani
- Ratubhai Adani, Indian politician
- Usayd al-Adani (died 2017), senior leader of Al-Qaeda in the Arabian Peninsula

== See also ==
- Adani (disambiguation)
