= Adan =

Adan may refer to:

- Garden of Eden, the Biblical paradise, Adan in Arabic

== People ==
- Adan (given name)
- Adan (surname)

== Places ==
- 'Adan or Aden, a city of Yemen
- 'Adan Governorate, Yemen
- Al-Adan, a district of the governorate of Mubarak Al-Kabeer in Kuwait
- The Adan River, located in India
- Adan, Hooghly, village in West Bengal, India
- Aden Protectorate Protectorate state of Britain from 1839 to 1960.

== See also ==
- Aden (disambiguation)
- Eden (disambiguation), Adan in Arabic
- Edain, a fictional race of humans in J. R. R. Tolkien's works
- Adan Ronquillo, a 1993 film by Joey del Rosario
- Windswept Adan, a 2020 album by Ichiko Aoba
