= Firuddin Babayev =

Azerbaijani scientist (1929-1987)

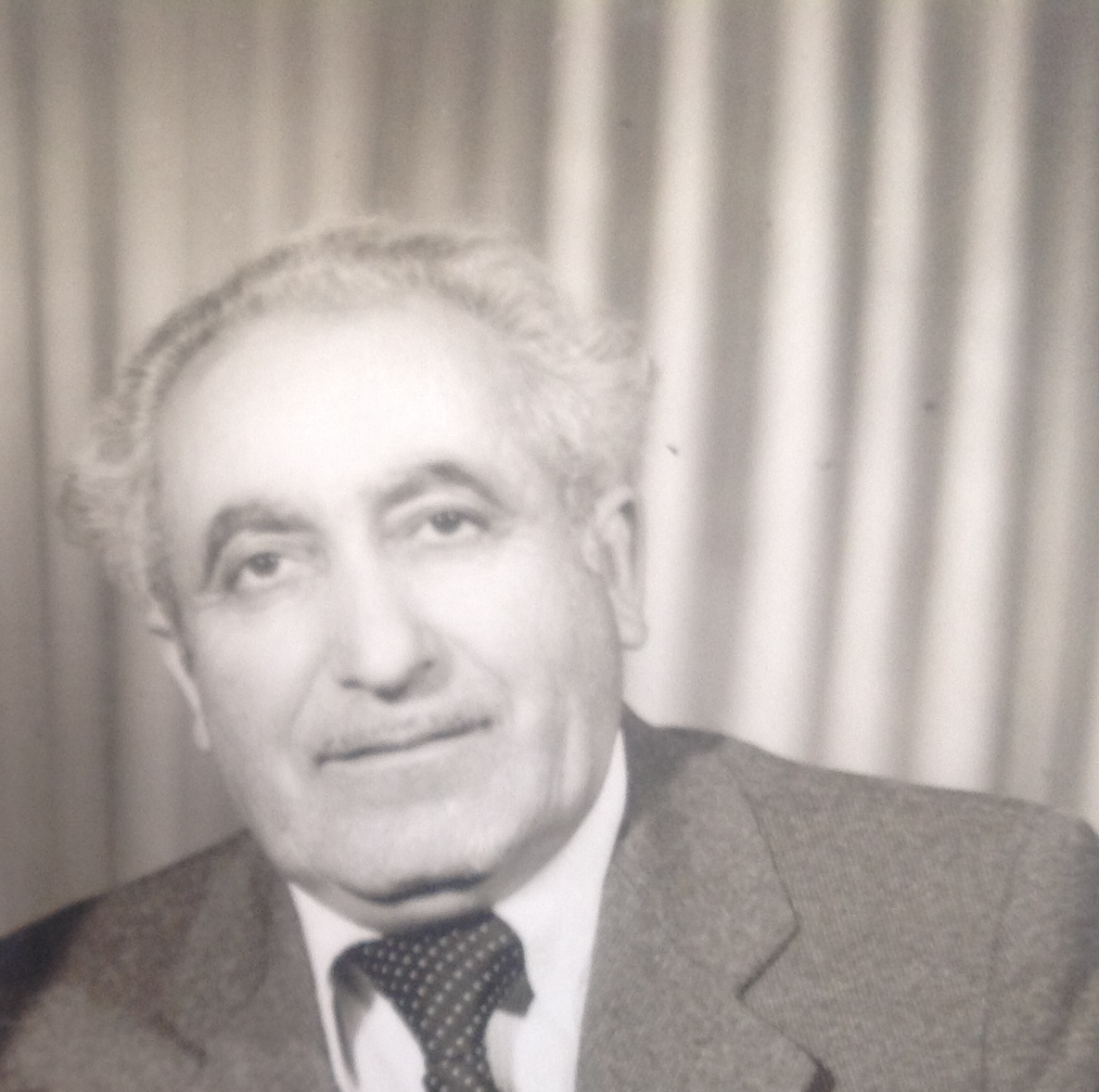
- Born: 1 May 1929; Barda, Azerbaijan SSR Soviet Union
- Died: 22 June 1987 (aged 58); Kirovabad, Azerbaijan SSR Soviet Union (now Ganja, Azerbaijan)
- Known for: Symptoms, Diagnosis, Management, Prevention and Recovery of Cotton with Verticillium wilt
- Awards: Diploma of the Presidium of the Supreme Soviet of Azerbaijan SSR
- Scientific career
- Fields: Plant pathology Immunology; Biochemistry; Botany; Genetics
- Workplaces: Azerbaijan State Agricultural Academy; Azerbaijan Scientific Research Institute of Cotton
- Doctoral advisor: Academician Prof. Dr. Mikhail S. Dunin

Firuddin Ali Babayev (Azerbaijani: Firuddin Əli oğlu Babayev; 1 May 1929 – 22 June 1987) was an internationally known Azerbaijani and Soviet scientist, Azerbaijan's first professor of plant pathology, doctor of biological sciences. Author of over 250 scientific works, monographs, books, articles and publications. He lectured and conducted workshops on plant pathology and plant immunity in many parts of the world. He was awarded a diploma of the Presidium of the Supreme Soviet of Azerbaijan SSR. He became known because of his success controlling verticillium wilt, the most dangerous disease of cotton, as it may affect more than 60% of plants. Babayev made significant contributions to several branches of science.

== Biography ==
Firuddin Babayev was born in Barda of Azerbaijan SSR on 1 May 1929. Was the oldest child in a family of six children. Babayev attended Agricultural College in Aghdam and in 1948 continued his studies of biology at the Faculty of Agronomy of the Azerbaijan State Agricultural Academy and graduating in 1953 with a degree of Higher agronomist. In 1959 he received a degree of Candidate of biological sciences in Chisinau, Moldova. In 1961, he got a degree of Senior Researcher of Phytopathology. On 21 April 1972, the Higher Attestation Commission approved Babayev in the degree of Doctor of Biological Sciences, and on 13 December 1972 the Presidium of the Higher Attestation Commission approved a scientist at the rank of professor. Thus Dr. Firuddin Babayev became the first professor of plant pathology in the Azerbaijan SSR. For many years he was head of the Laboratory of Phytopathology at the Azerbaijan Scientific Research Institute of Cotton. Later he became a professor of plant pathology at Azerbaijan State Agricultural Academy. His doctoral advisor was a prominent scientist and plant pathologist, head of plant pathology at the Russian State Agricultural University (Moscow Timiryazev Agricultural Academy), academician Mikhail S. Dunin.

Firuddin Babaev died on 22 June 1987, in Ganja. He was buried at the Alley of Honor in Ganja.

== Career and contributions ==
His doctoral work was on the prevention and fight against the most dangerous disease of cotton - Verticillium wilt. For the first time in the Soviet Union developed a method of chemical defense in the fight against this disease. The disease is most damaging in respect of medium staple varieties (Gossypium hirsutum). In order to help agricultural specialists in the fight against wilt, he wrote the book "Chemical Protection of Plants" (Azerbaijani: "Bitkilərin Kimyəvi Mühafizəsi")". Between 1953 and 1969, he conducted researches at AzSRIC, AzNIIZR, at the Institute of Biochemistry (the Academy of Sciences of the USSR), under the supervision of a member-correspondent of VASKhNIL, Pr. B.A.Rubin, at the Department of Plant Physiology of ASU, under the supervision of Academician M.G.Abutalibov, Pr. A.X.Tagizadeh; since 1965 - in immunological lab at the Department of Plant Pathology at Moscow Timiryazev Agricultural Academy, under the guidance of eminent academician of Agricultural Sciences, M.S.Dunin, who was his scientific consultant for a doctoral thesis on "Immunological studies of Verticillium wilt disease of cotton".

Babayev's work has been highly appreciated by academicians M.S.Dunin, I.M.Polyakov, N.A.Dorozhkin, M.Z.Mukhamedzhanov, L.A.Kanchaveli, I.D.Mustafayev, V.X.Tutayug, a corresponding member of the Academy of Sciences of the Moldavian SSR D.D.Verderovskiy, I.S.Popusha, corresponding members of the Academy of Sciences of the Azerbaijanian SSR M.A.Alizadeh, professors M.V.Rodigin, G.I.Yarovenko, I.D.Nagibin and others.

In 1966, F. Babayev received a letter from American professor of the University of California, plant pathologist Prof. Dr. Stephen Wilhelm, in which he praised the scientific works of F.A.Babayev and asked to send him the materials of his research. This work also aroused great interest of scientists in France. In 1971, during the international conference in Tashkent F.Babayev, made a report on cotton wilt. F.A.Babayev was invited to the University of California in the United States to give lectures on plant pathology. And also, for the same purpose many times invited to universities of England, France, India, Pakistan, Egypt etc.

== Personal life ==
He married in 1956 to Zarifa Babayeva. They had a son Fikret Babayev and two daughters Sevda Aliyeva (née Babayeva) and Flora Aliyeva (née Babayeva).

== Selected works ==
- Synthesis and making new hydrazones, testing their biological activity. — Ganja, Azerbaijan: 1972;
- Main diseases of cotton and measures against them. — Baku, Azerbaijan: 1977;
- The use of pesticides in agriculture of Azerbaijan SSR. — Ganja, Azerbaijan: 1987;
- Chemical Protection of Plants (Azerbaijani: "Bitkilərin Kimyəvi Mühafizəsi")" — Baku, Azerbaijan: 1992 (published after death).
