= SS Aden (1891) =

P&O steamship built in 1892 and wrecked in 1897

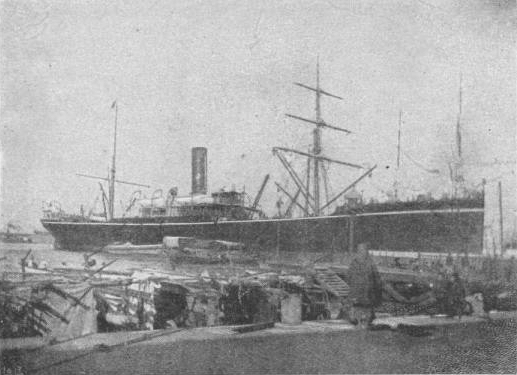
- Aden in port, date unknown

History

United Kingdom
- Name: Aden
- Namesake: Aden
- Owner: P&O SN Co
- Port of registry: Middlesbrough
- Route: UK – India and Far East
- Builder: Sir Raylton Dixon & Co, Middlesbrough
- Cost: £66,744
- Yard number: 340
- Launched: 5 October 1891
- Completed: 30 January 1892
- Maiden voyage: London to Hong Kong and Shanghai
- Identification: UK official number 98775; code letters MLDV
- Fate: wrecked on rocks, 9 June 1897

General characteristics
- Tonnage: 3,925 GRT, 2,517 NRT
- Length: 366.0 ft (111.6 m)
- Beam: 46.1 ft (14.1 m)
- Depth: 27.6 ft (8.4 m)
- Decks: 2
- Installed power: 471 NHP, 3,000 ihp
- Propulsion: 1 × screw; 1 × triple-expansion engine
- Speed: 12 knots (22 km/h)
- Capacity: 36 passengers; 252,970 cu ft (7,163 m^{3}) cargo
- Crew: 83
- Notes: sister ship: Ceylon

SS Aden was a P&O cargo ship that was built in England in 1892. She was wrecked in the Indian Ocean in 1897, with the loss of 78 lives. She was the second of three P&O steamships to be named after the British Aden Colony. The first was launched in 1856 as Delta, completed as Aden, and hulked in 1875. The third was launched in 1946 as Somerset, renamed Aden in 1954, and scrapped in 1967.

== Building ==
Sir Raylton Dixon & Co of Middlesbrough built the ship for £66,744. She was yard number 340. She was launched on 5 October 1891 and completed on 30 January 1892. Her registered length was 366.0 ft (111.6 m), her beam was 46.1 ft (14.1 m) and her depth was 27.6 ft (8.4 m). Her tonnages were 3,925 GRT and 2,517 NRT. Her holds had capacity for 252,970 cubic feet (7,163 m^{3}) of cargo. She had berths for 36 passengers, and she could carry troops in her tween decks.

She had a single screw, driven by a three-cylinder triple-expansion steam engine built by Thomas Richardson & Sons of Hartlepool. It was rated at 471 NHP or 3,000 ihp, and gave her a speed of 12 knots (22 km/h). She had two masts, rigged with spars, and she used sail propulsion as well as steam.

Aden carried three lifeboats and three others. Total capacity of her six boats was 276 people. She also carried some 120 lifebelts and 10 lifebuoys.

P&O registered the ship at Middlesbrough. Her UK official number was 98775 and her code letters were MLDV.

== Related ships ==
In 1892 P&O took delivery of four ships similar to Aden. The Naval Construction & Armament Co in Barrow-in-Furness launched Malacca in December 1891 and Formosa in March 1892. Caird & Company in Greenock launched Java in July 1892 and Manila in October 1892. All four were 385 feet (117 m) long and 45 feet (14 m) beam; slightly longer and narrower than Aden. Their engines had a slightly lower rating: about 439 NHP instead of 471 NHP.

In 1894 Sir Raylton Dixon & Co launched Ceylon. She was a sister ship of Aden, with the same beam and depth, similar capacities and engine, but her registered length was 375 feet (114 m); which was 11 feet (3.4 m) longer than Aden.

== Grounding of Aden ==
On 28 April 1897 Aden left Yokohama carrying a cargo of tea, silk, and tin. She called at ports in China and the Straits Settlements, and at Colombo in Ceylon, where she bunkered. She took 472 tons of coal in her bunkers, and another 75 tones on deck. She left Colombo on 2 June. Her Captain, REL Hill, had been with P&O for 17 years, and had held his Master's certificate for 12. Aden's crew had 83 members, of whom 60 were lascars. She carried 34 passengers, of whom 14 were children.

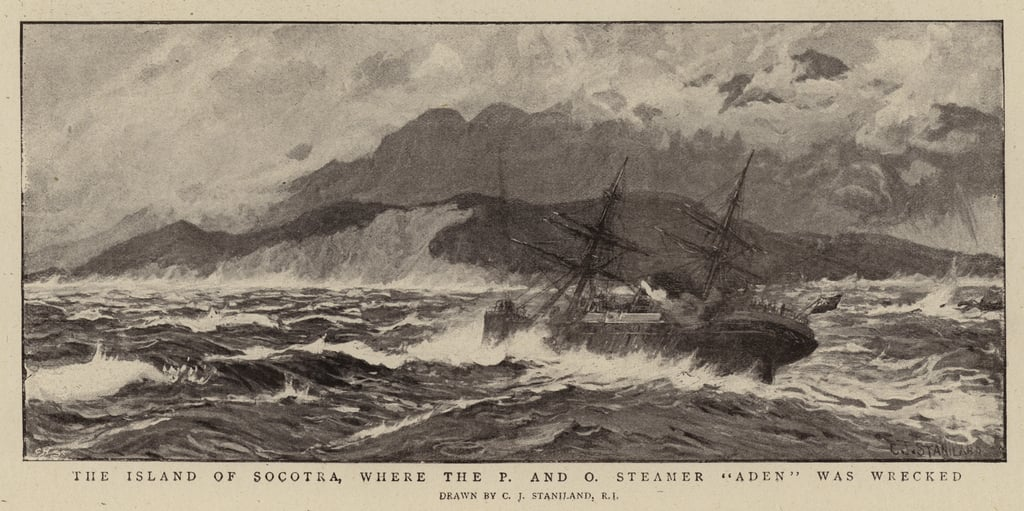
The Island of Socotra where the Steamer Aden was wrecked, by CJ Staniland, published in The Graphic, July 1897

On 8 June Aden reduced speed, while a working party transferred coal from her deck down to her bunkers, which by then were partly depleted. At about 0250 hrs on the morning of 9 June, Aden stuck rocks about 1 mile (1.6 km) southeast of Ras Radressa on Socotra, an island in the Arabian Sea near the mouth of the Gulf of Aden.

Her engine room quickly flooded, which caused the electric lights throughout the ship to fail within minutes. Waves broke over the port side of the ship, and in due course swept away all three boats on that side. Captain Hill ordered the starboard boats to be prepared to be lowered at first light.

== Loss of all of boats ==
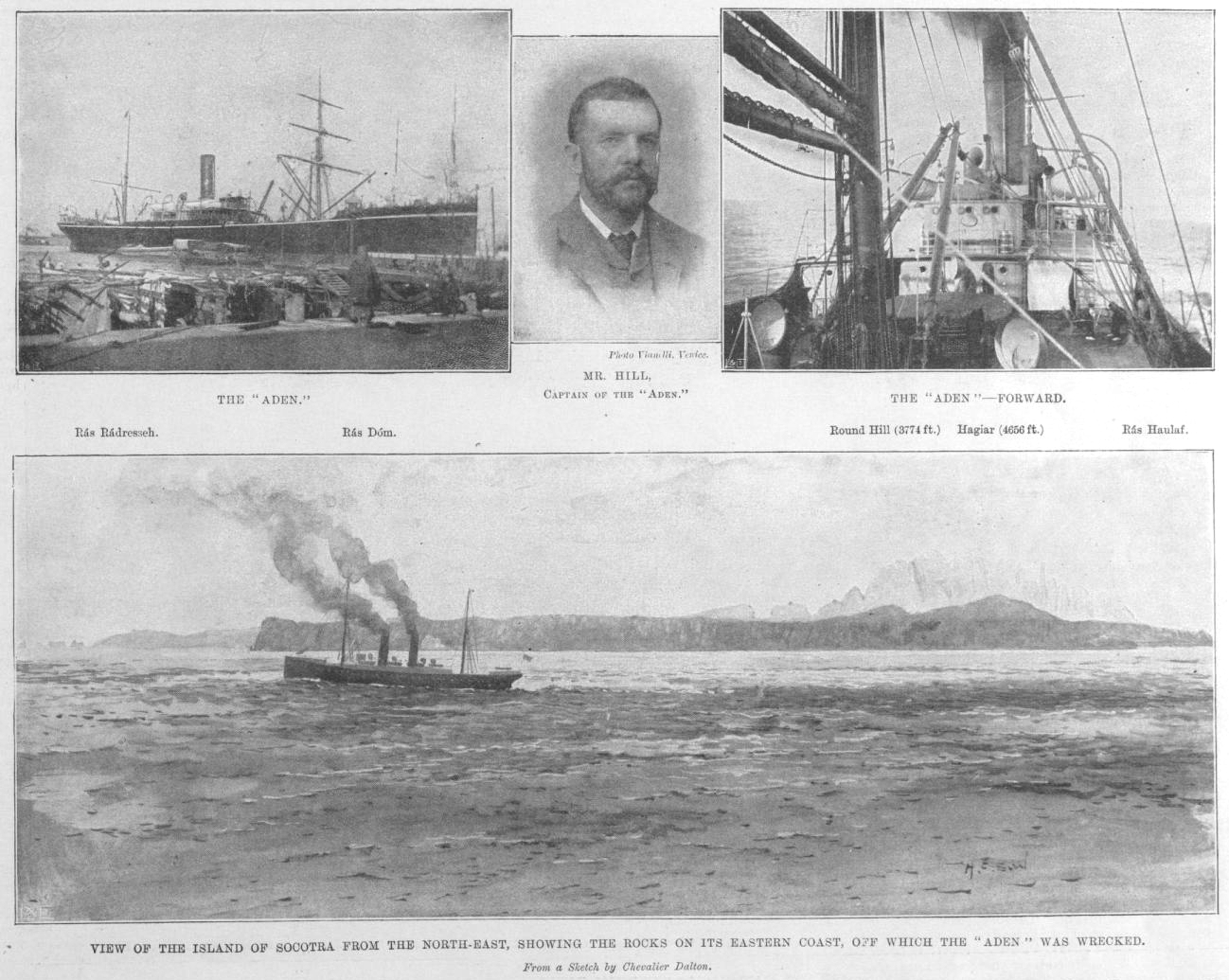
Montage of images in The Illustrated London News, 10 July 1897, including a portrait of Captain Hill

At daybreak the after starboard boat was lowered with three men in it, but a wave struck it, causing the boat to break adrift. The Chief Officer, Mr Carden, seized a line and jumped overboard to try to attach it to the boat. Neither he nor the boat was seen again. The second starboard boat, a cutter, was lowered. It set off, commanded by the second Officer, Mr Miller, to find the Chief Officer and the after lifeboat. But the sea carried the cutter away, and it, too, was not seen again.

The third starboard boat was lowered, commanded by the Third Officer, Mr Manning. A large wave broke over the boat and swept away one of the falls, tipping everyone out of the boat into the sea. All the occupants were rescued, and the third boat was recovered and bailed out. The boat was lowered a second time, again commanded by Third Officer Manning. He took with him the Fourth Officer, Mr Hurlstone; the Chief and Second engineers; ship's surgeon; ship's carpenter; winchman; European able seamen; and 17 women and children from among the passengers. The boat drifted away, and was not seen again.

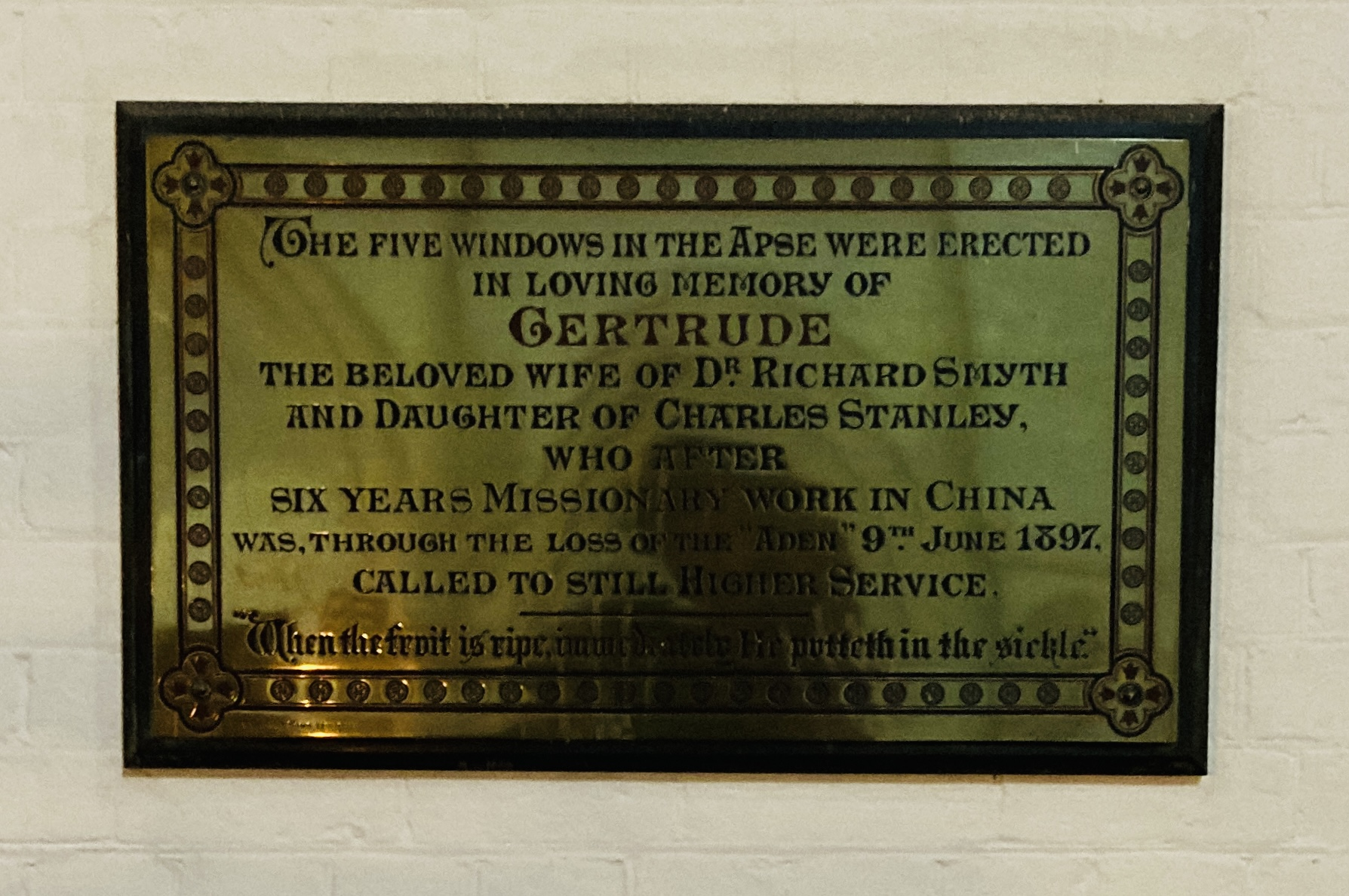
Plaque in Christ Church, Woking, Surrey in memory of to Gertrude Eliza Smyth, a Christian missionary who was lost aboard one of Aden's boats

After all three starboard boats had left the ship, there remained aboard Aden Captain Hill, the Third and Fourth Engineers, 17 passengers, and 33 of the lascars. At about 0900 hours a wave broke over the ship, sweeping Captain Hill and one of the passengers along the deck, and breaking one of Hill's legs. The passenger and the Third engineer helped Hill back to a place of shelter. Shortly afterward another wave swept Captain Hill overboard, and he was not seen again. In the course of the first day, eight of the passengers were also swept overboard and lost. The Third Engineer, Mr White, dislocated his shoulder when trying to save Captain Hill. A wave knocked down the Fourth Engineer, Mr Kelt, in an alley-way, rendering him unconscious for several hours.

== Survivors aboard the wreck ==
Survivors aboard Aden found shelter; the lascars in the forecastle and poop; and the officers and passengers in two saloon cabins. There they survived for the next two and a half weeks, scavenging what drinking water and food they could from those parts of the ship that they could safely reach.

Two ships passed the wreck without realising that survivors were still aboard. Harrison Line's Logician passed within 2 nautical miles (4 km) on 13 June. Her Master recorded in his logbook that waves were breaking over the wreck, and there was no sign of anyone alive. M Samuel & Co's Volute sighted the wreck on 17 June, and came within 1 nautical mile (2 km) to investigate. Her Master thought it unsafe to bring his ship any closer, but stood off for two or three hours looking for signs of life aboard Aden. Seeing none, Volute then resumed her course. It is claimed that P&O's Coromandel also sighted the wreck. However, the Board of Inquiry found that she was about 100 nautical miles (190 km) away.

== Rescue and search ==
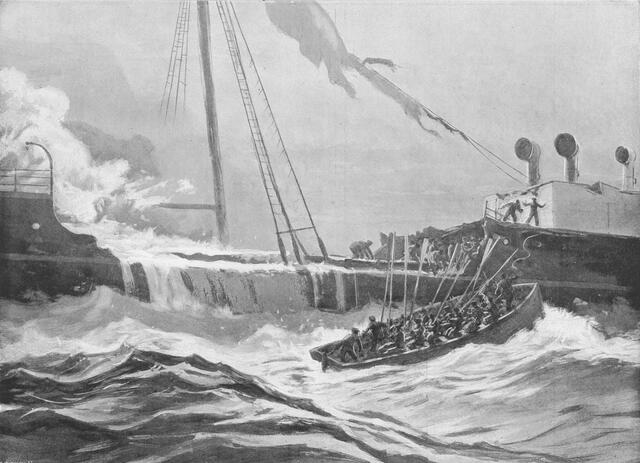
A boat from Mayo rescuing survivors from Aden. Illustration by Joseph Nash Jr. for The Graphic

On 20 June, P&O noted that Aden was overdue at Suez, but considered that the monsoon could have delayed her. The next day the company became concerned that she was still overdue, and on 22 June it telegraphed to Bombay and the port of Aden, asking for steamships from both ports to be sent to look for the missing ship. The included the 1,125 GRT Mayo, owned by the British Indian government, which set out from the port of Aden, and on 26 June found the wreck off Socotra. Sea conditions around the wreck were dangerous, but a boat from Mayo made two trips to the wreck, rescuing half of the survivors on each trip. In charge of the boat were two lieutenants, Dobbin and Goldsmith. Dobbin had survived the wreck of RIMS Warren Hastings only five months previously. On 29 June Mayo landed the survivors at Aden.

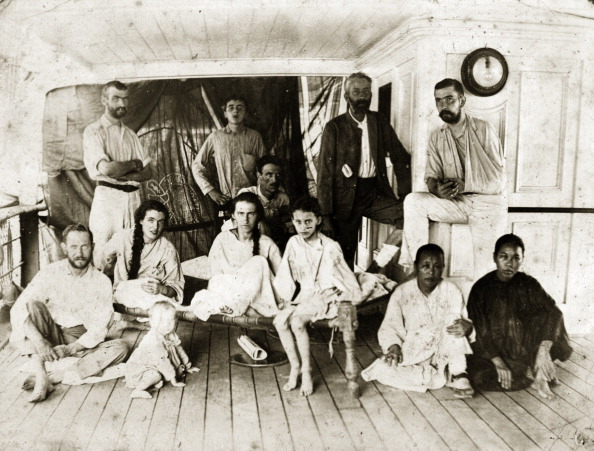
Some of Aden's survivors aboard Mayo: from Black & White magazine, 24 July 1897

P&O sent another of its ships, Rohilla, from the port of Aden to look for the occupants of the missing boats. She landed a party on Socotra, who found no trace of the missing people and boats. She then landed a party on the Khuriya Muriya Islands, 320 nautical miles (590 km) northeast of Socotra, but found trace there either.

The loss of Aden killed a total of 78 people: 25 passengers, 20 European officers andmen, and 33 lascars. Mayo rescued 46 survivors: nine passengers, three European crew, and 33 lascars. On 3 July the survivors left the port of Aden aboard the P&O liner India.

== Inquiry ==
The Board of Trade ordered that a Court of Inquiry be held to try to determine why Aden went off-course and ran aground. The court heard that a majority of P&O's captains, and also captains in the service of other shipping companies, had petitioned the Manager of P&O that a lighthouse should be built at the east end of Socotra, with a light visible from a distance of 25 nautical miles (46 km). However, counsel for the Board of Trade stated that only three ships had been wrecked on Socotra in the preceding 25 years. The Court of Inquiry declined to express an opinion on the matter, based on the evidence before it. The Court also concluded that there was not enough evidence for it to determine whether reducing speed while coal was transferred from on deck to the bunkers contributed to the loss of the ship.

== Bibliography ==
- Haws, Duncan; Rabson, Stephen (1978). The Ships of the P&O, Orient and Blue Anchor Lines. Merchant Fleets in Profile. Vol. 1. Cambridge: Patrick Stephens Ltd. ISBN 0-85059-319-0.
- Lloyd's Register of British and Foreign Shipping. Vol. I.–Steamers. London: Lloyd's Register of Shipping. 1896 – via Internet Archive.
- Mercantile Navy List. London. 1893 – via Crew List Index Project.
- "ADEN (1892)". poheritage.com. Ship factsheet at P&O Heritage.
