= Aden Sh. Hassan =

Ambassador for Djibouti

His Excellency Aden Nuriye أدان شيخ حسن نوريه Aadan Sheekh Xassan Nuuriye

Adviser to the President of Djibouti

Ambassador of Djibouti to Oman

Ambassador of Djibouti to Saudi Arabia

Amb. Aden Sheikh Hassan or Aden Sheikh Hassan Nuriye, also referred to as His Excelleny H.E Aden Sheikh (Somali: Aadan Sheekh Xassan ama Aadan Sheekh Xassan Nuuriye, Arabic: أدان شيخ حسن نوريه), was a prominent ambassador for Djibouti. Aden Sheikh Hassan was 1 of the 3 ambassadorial brothers from Ethiopia, Djibouti and Somalia, all ethnic Somalis, the other 2 brothers were Mohamed Sheikh Hassan and Ismail Sheikh Hassan, all from the same prominent family. The first time in history 3 Somali brothers managed to become ambassadors in 3 neighboring countries.

== History ==
Aden hails from a prominent family. They are known as the Ambassadorial Brothers. His father Sheikh Hassan Nuriye was a prominent Sheikh in Ethiopia, Djibouti and Somaliland. Sheikh Hassan had sired three sons who represented three African countries at ambassadorial level. Mohamed brothers are Mohamed Sheikh Hassan who represented Somalia at ambassadorial level and was the ambassador for Somalia to Canada, Nigeria and South Africa. His other brother Ismail Sheikh Hassan was the Ethiopian ambassador to Sudan and Libya. Aden Sheikh was the Ambassador of Djibouti to Saudi Arabia and Egypt. Sheikh Hassan family belongs to the Rer Ughaz (Reer Ugaas), Makahiildheere (Makahildere), subsection of the Makahiil (Makahil) branch of the Gadabursi (Gadabuursi). Mohamed served his country as ambassador to Canada and afterwards ambassador to Nigeria and South Africa.

Below is a quote from a Djiboutian source which mentions the ambassador presenting his credentials to the Sultanate of Oman.

AMBASSADOR TO OMAN--On 8 February the Republic of Djibouti first ambassador extraordinary and plenipotentiary to Oman presented his credentials to His Majesty Sultan Qaboos. During the ceremony, Ambassador Aden Sheikh Hassan in a brief speech talked about the good relations which exist between the Republic of Djibouti and the Sultanate of Oman--relations based on historical ties and mutual understanding

— Djibouti LA NATION in French, 18 Feb 1982, Sub-Saharan Africa Report - Issues 2608-2615

=== Career ===
- Ambassador for Djibouti to Oman
- Ambassador for Djibouti to Saudi Arabia
- Current Adviser to the President of Djibouti, Ismail Omar Guelleh

=== Family tree ===
- Sheikh Hassan Nuriye, Father of all 3 Ambassadors and prominent Sheikh in all 3 countries
- Mohamed Sheikh Hassan - Ambassador for Somalia to United Arab Republic, Canada and Nigeria
- Ismail Sheikh Hassan - Ambassador for Ethiopia to Libya
- Aden Sheikh Hassan - Ambassador for Djibouti to Egypt and Saudi Arabia

	Sheikh Hassan Nuriye
Mohamed	Ismail	Aden

Three Somali brothers were citizens of three different countries, working in sensitive posts for three different governments

— Mohamed Osman Omar , The road to zero: Somalia's self-destruction
