= SS Aden (1856) =

SS Aden was a British combined sail and steam-driven passenger liner built in 1856 and owned by the Peninsular and Oriental Steam Navigation Company (P&O) and employed on the Far East services.

Launched on 21 May 1856 as the SS Delta, she was built by Day, Summers and Company of Southampton. She had a gross tonnage of 812 and measured 257 ft 6 inches by 29 ft 10 inches beam. Fitted with two direct-acting trunk steam engines of 210 ihp which drove a single screw, she had a service speed of 13 knots and could carry 112 first class passengers, and 22 in second class. Her name was changed in the expectation that P&O would take over the Suez/Bombay mail service from the East India Company. On her maiden voyage she ran from Southampton to Gibraltar. The Aden left Southampton on 1 October 1856 for Mumbai, arriving on 27 December 1856. In March 1857 she was involved in transporting troops to the Persian Gulf for the Anglo-Persian War before transferring to Hong Kong, where she was to remain for much of the rest of her service.

On 28 February 1863 the Aden broke her shaft and lost a screw off Amoy and was forced to return to Hong Kong under sail. After repairs at Whampoa Dock she re-entered service in March 1863. In 1864 she was extensively overhauled at Mumbai, being fitted with new boilers with super-heaters. At the same time she was fitted with new deck houses, bulwarks, forecastle, spars and rigging, etc. Each plate on her hull was also carefully examined. The Aden now could carry 33 first class passengers.

In 1869 the Aden carried a number of official guests from Marseille to Port Said for the inauguration ceremonies of the Suez Canal. In November 1872 she was sold for £15,000 to Prefect Chu, Shanghai who immediately sold her to the China Merchants Steam Navigation Company of Shanghai where it became that company's first vessel. In 1875 she was reduced to a hulk.

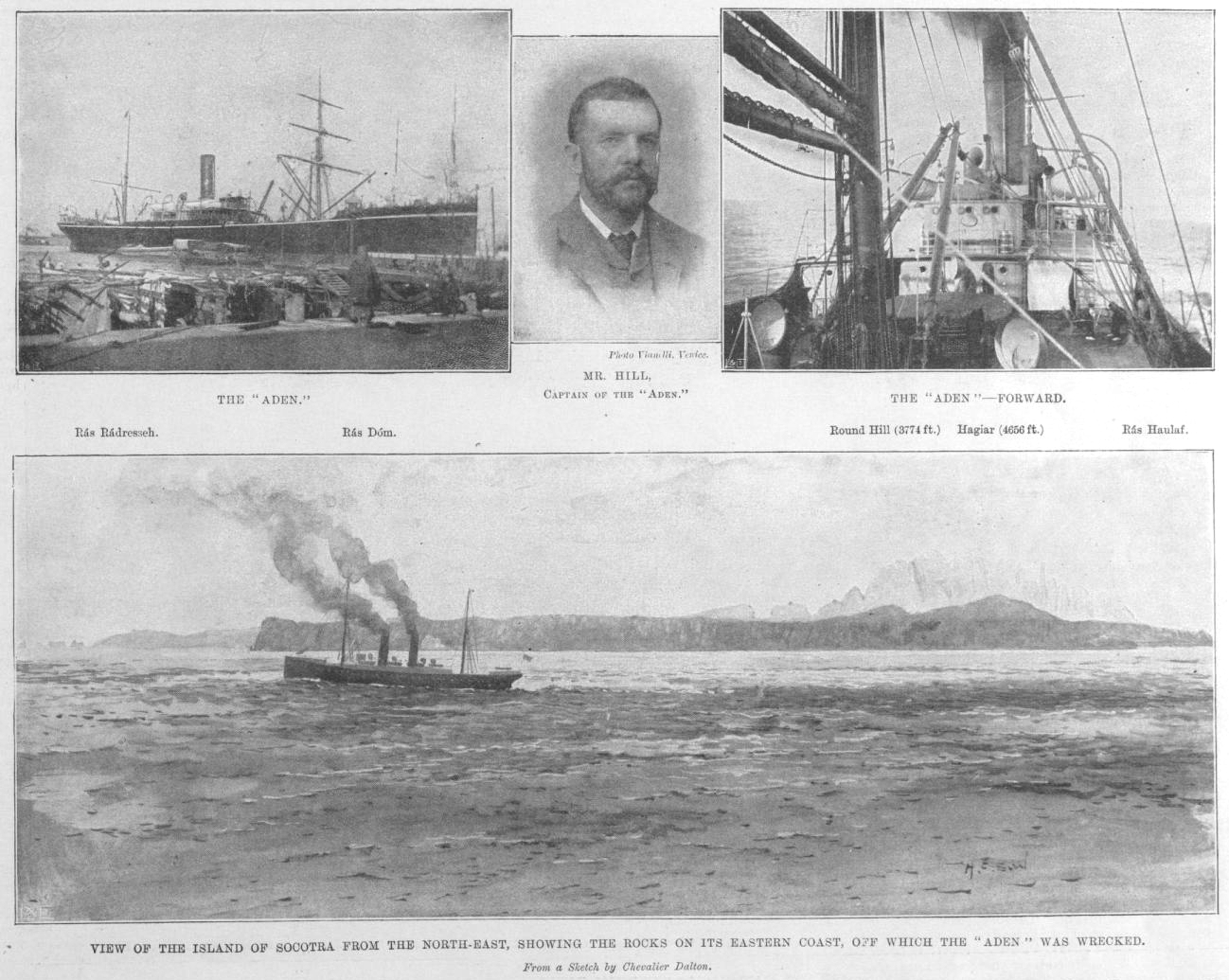
The wreck of the second Aden launched 1891, off Socotra in 1897

She was the first of three ships to carry the name SS Aden. The second SS Aden sank in 1897 off the eastern coast of Socotra with the loss of much life. The third Aden was completed in 1946 and served worldwide in the tramp liner trade. She was scrapped in 1967.
