= Babay Luy-e Janan Lu =

Babay Luy-e Janan Lu بابايلوي جانانلو
- Village
- Location within Iran
- Coordinates: 39°06′58″N 46°52′03″E
- Country: Iran
- Province: East Azerbaijan
- County: Khoda Afarin
- Bakhsh: Minjavan
- Rural District: Minjavan-e Sharqi

Population (2006)
  - Total: 173
- Time zone: UTC+3:30 (IRST)
  - Summer (DST): UTC+4:30 (IRDT)

Babay Luy-e Janan Lu (Persian: بابايلوي جانانلو, also Romanized as Bābāy Lūy-e Jānān Lū; also known as Bābāylū and Bābāy Lū) is a village in Minjavan-e Sharqi Rural District, Minjavan District, Khoda Afarin County, East Azerbaijan Province, Iran. At the 2006 census, its population was 173, in 36 families.
