= Somalia national taekwondo team =

Taekwondo team

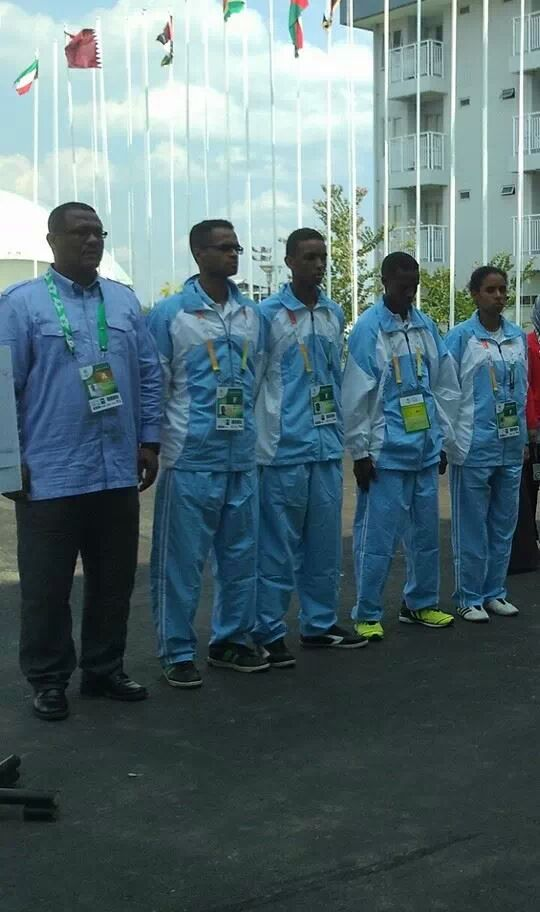
Somali taekwondo national team at the rising flag of Somalia in Palembang, Indonesia. Islamic games 2013.

The Somalia national Taekwondo team is the national taekwondo squad of Somalia. It is controlled by the Somali Karate and Taekwondo Federation.

== Overview ==
The Somali Karate and Taekwondo Federation has been affiliated with the World Taekwondo Federation since 1997. It is based in Mogadishu.

Somalia's national Taekwondo team takes part in international, Africa and Arab world Taekwondo competitions. At the 2013 Open World Taekwondo Challenge Cup in Tongeren, squad members Faisal Jeylani Aweys and Mohamed Deq Abdulle took home a silver medal and fourth place, respectively. The Somali Olympic Committee has devised a special support program to ensure continued success in future tournaments.

== See also ==
- World Taekwondo Championships
