= Alfonso Adán =

Spanish politician (1972–2024)

- Born: 12 April 1972; Madrid, Spain
- Died: 31 December 2024 (aged 52); Binéfar, Spain
- Occupation: Mayor of Binéfar (2015–2023)
- Political party: PSOE

Alfonso Adán Pozo (12 April 1972 – 31 December 2024) was a Spanish politician from the Party of the Socialists of Aragon, mayor of Binéfar from 2015 to 2023.

== Life and career ==
Adán was born in Madrid on 12 April 1972, although he spent most of his life in Binéfar, both personally and professionally. He was mayor of Binéfar from 13 June 2015 until 17 June 2023, when Patricia Rivera succeeded him as the first female mayor of Binéfar, gaining four votes from the PP, two from VOX, and one from the PAR. Previously, he had served as a councilor since 2007, until he was elected mayor. He was a member of the Executive of the Aragonese Federation of Municipalities, Counties, and Provinces and participated in the Spanish Federation of Municipalities and Provinces as a member of the Urbanism and Housing Commission from 2016 to 2019.

On 24 November 2022, he announced that he would run for re-election as mayor of Binéfar. On 8 November 2023, after failing to retain the position following the 2023 Spanish municipal elections, he stepped down as secretary-general of the PSOE in Binéfar.

Adán died in Binéfar on the night of 31 December 2024, at the age of 52. Following his death, the Binéfar City Council declared an official day of mourning. A funeral chapel was set up in the Town Hall's plenary room, as per an express agreement with his family.
