= Horseed FC vs Heegan FC (2015) =

- Event: Gneneral Da'ud cup final
Horseed FC	Heegan FC
2	1
- Date: 17 December 2015
- Venue: Banadir Stadium, Mogadishu
- Attendance: tens of thousands

Horseed FC vs Heegan FC was the first ever association football match to be aired live in Somalia.

== Significance ==
The significance of this event is attributed to the fact that this sports event is an indication for the increasing visibility of stability in Somalia. After the country had undergone two decades and a half of civil war it made any semblance of entertainment unthinkable due to the fact that venues that hosted such events would usually be targeted. The Somali Football Federation president Abdiqani Said Arab considered the ability to broadcast live on local television as "a breakthrough" and evidence that the country is recovering after a lengthy period of violence. It was expected to attract a large number of fans from all over the country.

Abdiqani Said Arab:

We had long dreamed of getting our matches watched live. This is almost the realisation of our age-old dreams.

"This will be a test, but if we are successful in this endeavour, we will try to get our matches go live in the months to come

— General Da'ud Cup venue, locals

== Overview ==
It simultaneously was also the most watched Somali football game in history, and described by media officials as ‘the most hotly-contested’ football game in Somalia ever. Deeq Abdullahi Nur AKA Aariyo scored the first goal for Heegan in the 32nd minute. In the second half however, Horseed upped their game after the equalizer by Adaani Barre Isse and the winning goal by Kenyan Daniel Matango.

== See also ==
- Somalia League
