= Etibar Babayev =

Azerbaijani journalist

Etibar Babayev (born 15 December 1950, Baku) is an Azerbaijani scientist, tele-journalist, and pedagogue. A candidate to art, associate professor. A rector of Teleradio Academy under AzTV. Babayev won the "Hacı Zeynalabdin Tağıyev" national award, "Qızıl qələm" journalistic award.

== Biography ==
Etibar Babayev was born on December 15, 1950, in Baku. He finished secondary school in 1968, and in 1973, he graduated from theatre science faculty Azerbaijan State Art İnstitute named M.Aliyev. He got second higher education on politology in Baku Supreme Party School. He began his career cooperation with Azərbaycan Teleradio verilişləri Komitəsi editorship in 1971. He gained favor of audience as an author and an anchorman of popular telecasts like "Tələbə klubu", "Yeddinci qitə", "Sözlü-nəğməli İstanbul", "Kanal-6 təqdim edir". Etibar Babayev worked an instructor in Central Committee of Azerbaijan Komsomol, a chief of notification and mass urbane affairs, an instructor in a department of culture in Central Committee of Azerbaijan Communist Party, a chief of a notification of agitation department in Party Committee of Baku city in 1981-1988. He was elected a deputy of Baku city Sovet for four challenges in 1981-1989. In 1989-1992, he worked as a manager of "Azərbaycantelefilm" and a vice-president of Azerbaijan State TV and Radio Organization. Etibar Babayev worked in several responsible posts in Baku Executive Power in 1993-2001. He was a president of independence TV and Radio organization of Space in 2001-2006.

As a candidate to art, Etibar Babayev also deals with scientific-pedagogical affairs. He was a tutor in Azerbaijan State Culture in 2001 and Art University and later, Baku Slavic University. From 2009, associate professor E.Babayev worked as a head of department in Journalism faculty. He was charged as a rector to newly created TV and Radio Academy under Azərbaycan Televiziya və Radio verilişləri Qapalı Səhmdar Cəmiyyəti.

E.Babayev was honored to "Hacı Zeynalabdin Tağıyev" national award, "Qızıl qələm" journalistic award, Yusif Mammadaliyev's medal, and various honorable certificate and diplomas.

He doesn't attend any party membership.

Babayev made business trips to USA, England, France, Russia, Spain, Belgium, Netherlands, Germany, Hungary, Austria, Romania, Poland, Turkey, Senegal, Egypt, Vietnamese, Cuba, DRC, Iran, Sweden, Switzerland and other different countries, met with outstanding social-political, scientific and artistic figures, and saw popular faces of business world, and took exclusive interviews. He took part in international conferences, forms in an official group. Babayev is an author of different publicist writings, scientific articles that published in Azerbaijan and abroad, books such as "Bu da bir imtahandır", "Yalana heykəl", "Düz söz əyri qulağa necə girər?" and documentaries that showed on television several times like "Sağalmaz yara", "Birincilər", "Bir millət, iki dövlət", "Zirvə", "Çiçək yağışı".
