= Mogadiscio circuit =

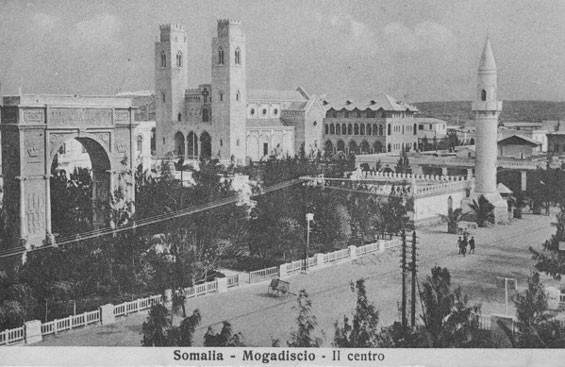
Corso Vittorio Emanuele, where was done the "Circuito Mogadiscio" in 1938 and 1939. The stands where near the "Arch" dedicated to Umberto II

The Mogadiscio Circuit (Italian: Circuito di Mogadiscio) was formerly a car race through the main streets of Mogadiscio, Italian Somaliland, being first run in 1938.

== History ==
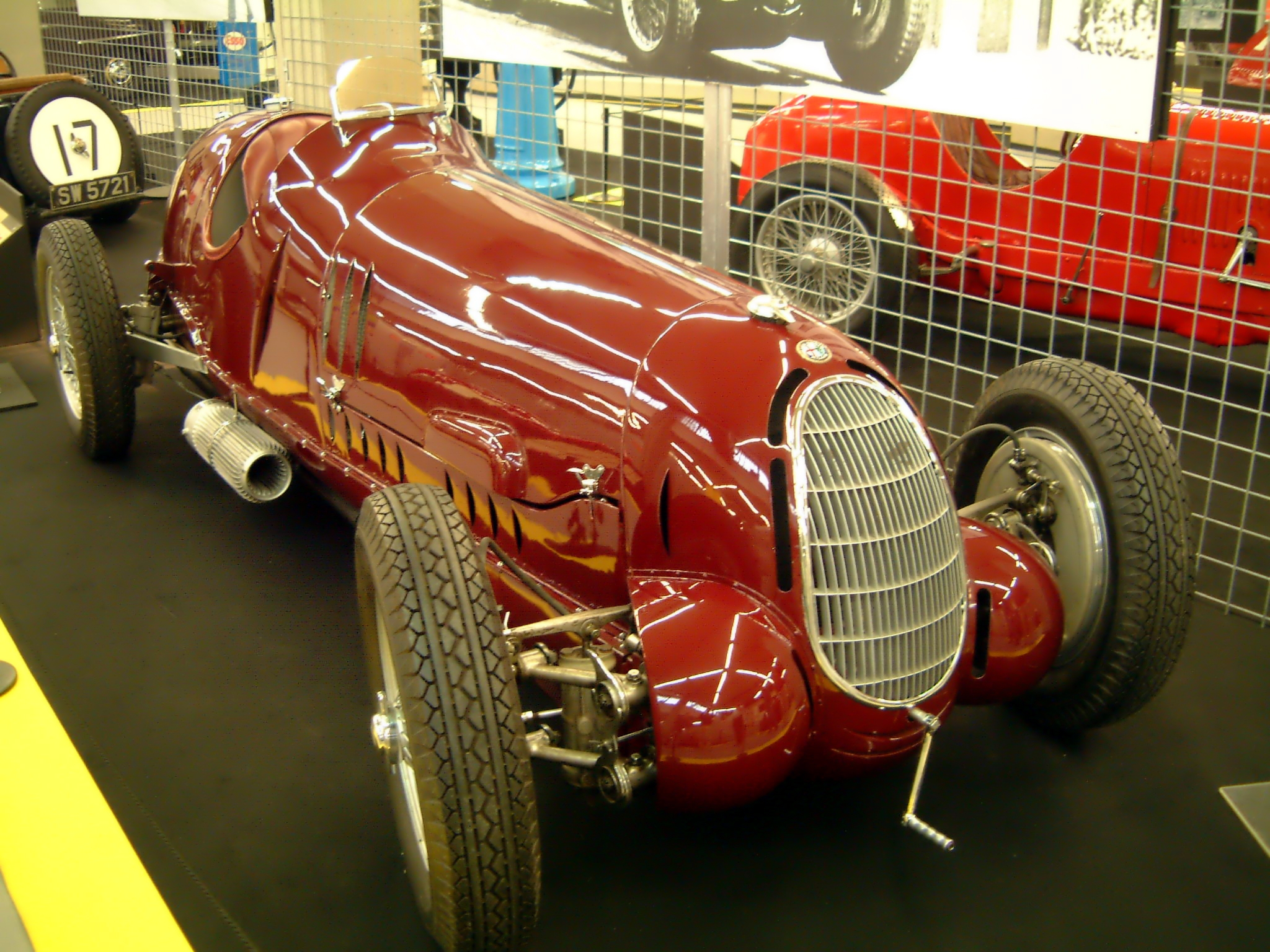
A late version of the Alfa Romeo 1750 (winner of the 1938 Circuito Montecarlo) in a Museum

The main Italian newspaper of Italian Somaliland, Il Littoriale, reported that the first car race circuit of Mogadiscio was held in mid-August 1938.

On August 15, 1938, Francesco Saveno, Governor of Italian Somaliland, flagged the start of the first car race, watched by many thousands of people, in the Corso Vittorio Emanuele (now called Somalia Boulevard) in the capital of Italian Somaliland, where the main viewing stands were located. Thousands of Somalis lined the streets of Mogadiscio to watch the first car race in their country.

It was then followed by a motorcycle race, involving 250 cc and 350 cc categories, which was won respectively by Girotto on Benelli and by Pontiggia on Guzzi.

The car race was similar (although smaller) to those in other Italian colonies: the Circuito Asmara in Italian Eritrea and the world-famous Tripoli Grand Prix in Italian Libya. The Circuito di Mogadiscio was repeated again in 1939, but the race of 1940 was cancelled because of the outbreak of the Second World War.

The race was done without accidents and registered the following results: Battaglia on "Alfa Romeo 1750" was the winner for Category Sport at 111 km/h, while Lombardi won on "Fiat Balilla" the Category 1500cc and Ciccotti won the Category Tourism on "Lancia DiLambda"....Il Littoriale

The most important category was dominated by the Alfa Romeo 1750, a race car built under Enzo Ferrari's supervision that won in many other circuits (like the Christmas Asmara circuit of 1938).

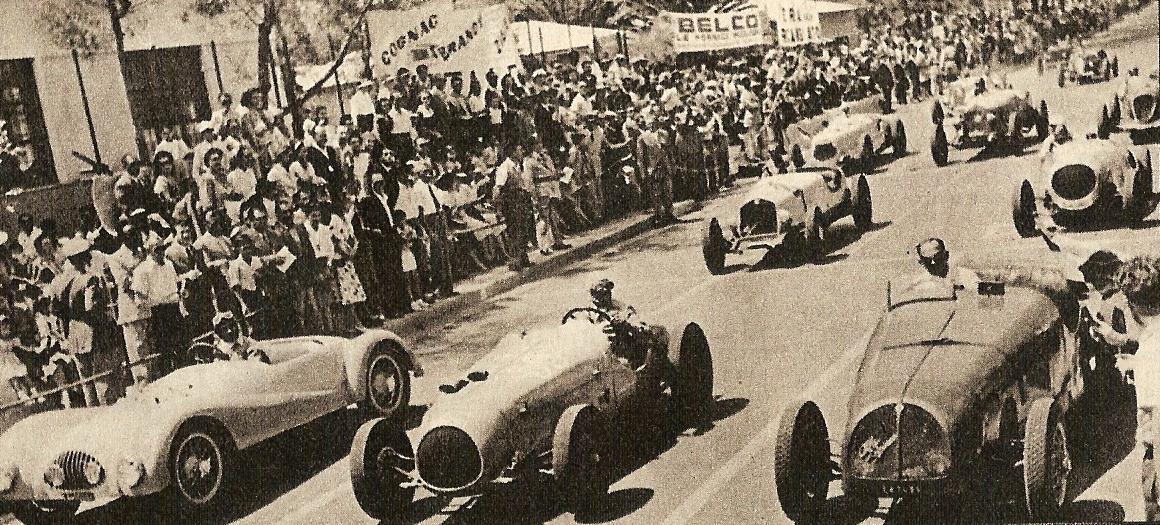
An early version of the Alfa Romeo 1750 (white car in second line) in a 1950 Asmara Race

According to Gianluca Gabrielli, there were 7 stands (2 stands only for the autochthonous population), and the magazine/newspaper Corriere della Somalia reported that in 1938 more than 10,000 spectators enjoyed the two sets of races (cars and motorcycles)

Those race cars were also promoted by the Italian government to increase the prestige of the Italian Empire, both within the colonies themselves and throughout the wider world; the cars were to show the Kingdom of Italy as a technologically advanced country with a state-of-the-art mechanical industry. Indeed, Italian-ruled Mogadiscio in 1938 was the second manufacturing city - after Asmara - in Italian East Africa. The triangle Mogadiscio-Genale-Villabruzzi was the most developed area of the Italian colony, with one of the biggest vehicle concentrations (per inhabitants) of all Africa: nearly 3,000 vehicles in 1939.

=== Motorcycle races after the Second World War ===
After the Second World War, the Circuito Mogadiscio was run only with motorcycles and was called Gran Premio Motociclistico della Somalia (GP Motorcycle of Somalia). It was held annually from 1950 until 1954, during the Italian Trusteeship of Somalia. The race was run on the coastal streets of Mogadiscio, near the port and on Lungomare Corni, and was more than one mile long.

Attilio Di Nunzio won the 500cc category from 1950 to 1952 with his self-improved Guzzi.

== Bibliography ==
- Del Boca, Angelo and Gabrielli, Gianluca. L’attività sportiva nelle colonie italiane durante il fascismo. Tra organizzazione del consenso, disciplinamento del tempo libero e «prestigio di razza» "I Sentieri della ricerca", rivista di storia contemporanea. Crodo, 2005
- Hess, Robert L. Italian Colonialism in Somalia. University of Chicago P. Chicago, 1966.
- Tripodi, Paolo. The Colonial Legacy in Somalia. St. Martin's P Inc. New York, 1999.

== See also ==
- Somalia italiana
- Asmara circuit
- Tripoli Grand Prix
