= Faisal Jeylani Aweys =

Somali taekwondo practitioner (born 1987)

Faisal Jeylani Aweys فيصل جيلاني عويس
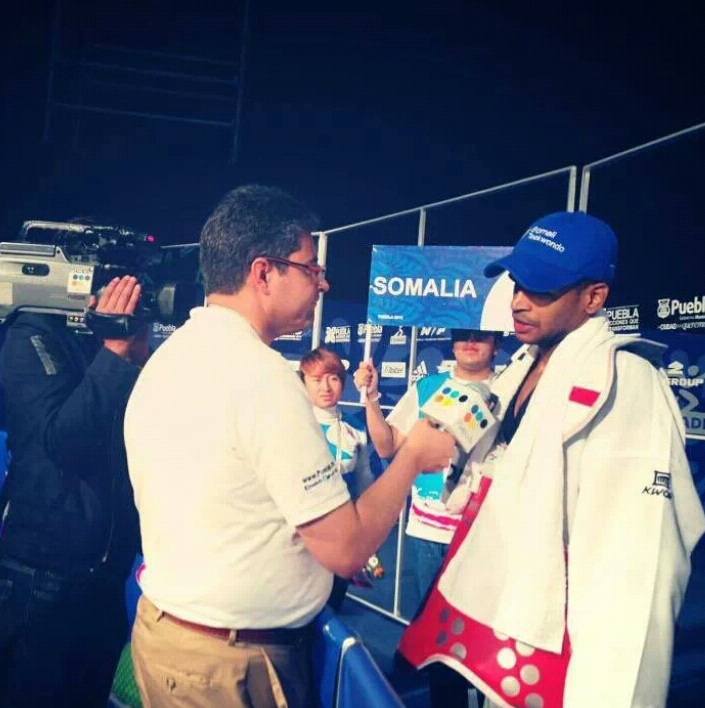
- Faisal Jeylani Aweys at the 2013 Taekwondo World Championship in Puebla, Mexico.
- Born: Faysal Jaylaani Caweeys; 1987 (age 38–39); Mogadishu, Somali Democratic Republic
- Other names: FAIS
- Nationality: Somali
- Height: 1.79 m (5 ft 10 in)
- Weight: 62 kg (137 lb; 9 st 11 lb)
- Division: -58kg and -63kg
- Style: Taekwondo
- Fighting out of: Mogadishu
- Team: Somalia national Taekwondo team
- Trainer: Elton de Souza Moreira
- Years active: 2000s-present

Other information
- Occupation: Taekwondo athlete
- Website: www.somalitaekwondo.com

Faisal Jeylani Aweys (Somali: Faysal Jaylaani Caweeys, Arabic: فيصل جيلاني عويس) is a Somali taekwondo practitioner.

== Personal life ==
Aweys was born in 1987 in Mogadishu, Somalia. He later moved to Switzerland at the age of 13.

Based in Lausanne, he competed in taekwondo for his school, Taekwondo Malley.

== Career ==
Spotted in a tournament in Switzerland by Duran Farah, Aweys subsequently joined the Somalia national Taekwondo team. He trained there alongside Mohamed Deq Abdulle, with Elton de Souza serving as coach.

In 2010, Aweys along with his friend Anthony Wood founded their own taekwondo club. One year after its inception, the club quickly formed four national champions.

That year, Aweys won his first national title at the Switzerland Championships. He also won several other tournaments elsewhere in Europe, including in France, Germany and Belgium.

Aweys' collaboration with the Somali Olympic Committee allowed him to compete for Somalia for the first time outside of Europe. He took part in the Alexandria open in Egypt in 2013, where he finished fourth.

At the 2013 Open World Taekwondo Challenge Cup in Tongeren, Aweys and Mohamed Deq Abdulle also took home a silver medal and fourth place, respectively. The Somali Olympic Committee has devised a special support program for the Somalia national Taekwondo team to ensure continued success in future tournaments.

In May 2014, Aweys participated in the Taekwondo African Championships held in Tunisia. He beat competitors from Gabon and Mozambique, before eventually losing in the semi-finals against a stylist representing Egypt. Aweys ended up winning a bronze medal, his highest continental award since he started fighting for Somalia.

In June 2014, Aweys' World Taekwondo Federation (WTF) ranking had risen to the 56th best fighter in his weight class. He continues to train in pursuit of more medals.
