= Nanaqiz Babayeva =

Azerbaijani cotton grower and farmer (1922–2003)

- Nənəqız Rza qızı Babayeva
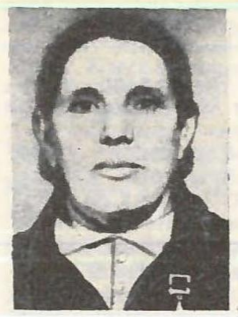
- Born: 1922; Babı, Jabrayil District, Azerbaijan SSR
- Died: 29 March 2003 (aged 80–81); Babı, Fuzuli District, Azerbaijan
- Occupations: Cotton grower, collective farmer
- Awards: Medal "For Labour Valour" (1949); Hero of Socialist Labour (1950); Order of Lenin (1950)

Nanaqiz Rza qizi Babayeva (Azerbaijani: Nənəqız Rza qızı Babayeva; 1922 – 29 March 2003) was a Soviet Azerbaijani cotton grower and collective farmer who was awarded the title of Heroine of Socialist Labour and the Order of Lenin award in 1950 in recognition for her work on a collective farm harvesting large amounts of cotton. She also received the Medal "For Labour Valour".

== Early life ==
Nanaqiz Rza qizi Babayeva was born in 1922 in the village of Babı in the Jabrayil District of the Azerbaijan Soviet Socialist Republic (now the Fuzuli District).

== Career ==
In 1941, she began working at the Voroshilov (later known as G. Asadov) collective farm in the Jabrayil district and was eventually appointed as a team leader. In 1949, under her leadership, her team yielded 74 centners of cotton per hectare on a 6 hectare area. The same year, she was awarded the Medal "For Labour Valour" on 1 July. The next year, Babayeva and her fellow team leder M. Yu. Gumbatova were granted the title Heroine of Socialist Labour as well as the Order of Lenin and the Hammer and Sickle gold medal by the decree of the Presidium of the Supreme Soviet of the Soviet Union on 29 August 1950. Babayeva was awarded this for her high cotton yields on irrigated land, while still continuing to fulfil her mandatory agricultural deliveries and contracts, in addition to providing the necessary crop seeds for the following spring sowing season.

Babayeva became a member of the Communist Party of the Soviet Union in 1954.

== Later life and death ==
Babayeva retired from the farm in 1968, and began receiving a personal pension of union significance from the Soviet government. On 2 October 2002, she was given a personal pension by the President of Azerbaijan. The following year, on 29 March 2003, Babayeva died in her home village of Babı.
