= Amos Adani =

Italian footballer (born 1946)

Personal information
- Date of birth: 2 April 1946 (age 80)
- Place of birth: Modena, Italy
- Height: 1.83 m (6 ft 0 in)
- Position: Goalkeeper

Senior career*
Years	Team	Apps	(Gls)
1965–1968	Modena	41	(0)
1968–1978	Bologna	104	(0)
- * Club domestic league appearances and goals as of 17 February 2015

Amos Adani (born 2 April 1946) is an Italian retired footballer. He spent most of his career in Bologna in the Serie A, as reserve goalkeeper.

== Honours ==
Coppa Italia Bologna: 1969–70, 1973–74
