= Aden Mohamed Ali =

Senior Somali politician

Aden Mohamed Ali آدن محمدعلي
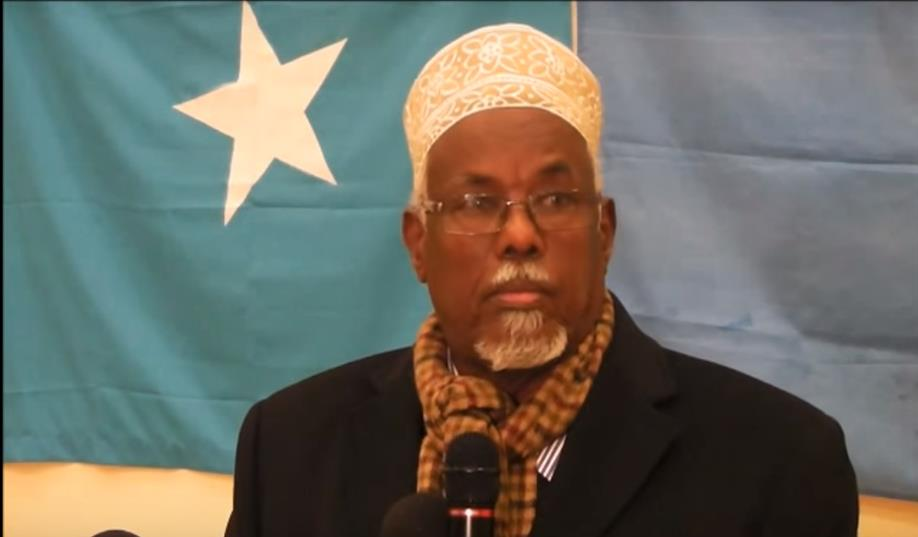

Minister
- In office 1964–1989
- President: Siad Barre
- Succeeded by: Abdiqasim Salad Hassan

Personal details
- Born: 13 December 1939 (age 86) Baargaal, Somalia
- Party: Supreme Revolutionary Council
- Education: Institute of Teaching

Aden Mohamed Ali (Somali: Aadan Maxamed Cali, Arabic: آدن محمدعلي; born 13 December 1939) is a senior Somali politician. He was the longest-serving minister in the government of Mohamed Siad Barre, in which he was Minister of Labor and Sports in 1975, Minister of Education in 1977 and Minister of Fisheries, Ports and Marine Transport in 1990. He is a member of the Somali Revolutionary Socialist Party, and became a member of the parliament from 2000 to 2009.

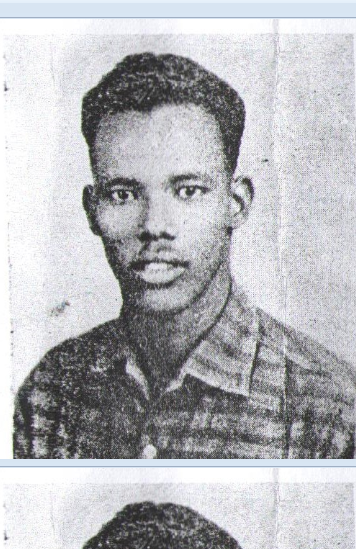
Start of National Service

== Biography ==
Aden was born in Bargal, situated in the east Bari region of Somalia. The city was at the time part of Italian Somaliland. His family hailed from the Siwaaqroon-Majeerteen Harti Daarood clan.

=== Academic standards ===
He attended a Quranic school, primary school in Bargal, and later graduated from a teacher's institute in Mogadishu.

== Career ==
In 1960, Aden became a teacher. In 1965, he was promoted to Chairman of the teachers' union. In 1966, he was the Secretary General of the Somali Trade Union Confederation, an umbrella organization of twenty-three unions. These included unions in health, education, agriculture, industry, public works, ports and maritime transport, and local governments. In 1970, he was the Governor of Banadir. Banadir at that time consisted of three regions: Middle Shabelle, Lower Shabelle and Mogadishu, located from Adan Yabal to Barawe. As governor, he was involved in changes in education in the country, new curriculum, Somali language writing, Bar or Baro campaign, rural development campaign, writing committees, expatriate students and national service students. In 1974, he became Minister of Labor, Social Affairs and Sports. In 1976, he became the Minister of Education. In 1982, he became the foreign affairs leadership of the Somali Socialist Party. In 1988, he was the financial and administrative leader of the Somali Revolutionary Socialist Party. In 1985, he was a member of the Ministry of Fisheries and Marine Resources.
