= Stephen Wilhelm =

Stephen Wilhelm (19 April 1919, Imperial, California – 15 July 2002, Walnut Creek, California) was a professor of plant pathology, known for his success in controlling Verticillium wilt. His research on plant hybridization and soil fumigation contributed to revolutionary developments in the strawberry and raspberry industries.

== Biography ==
Wilhelm matriculated in 1941 at the University of California, Los Angeles and graduated there with bachelor's degree in 1944. During WW II, he served in the U.S. Army. He received his Ph.D. in 1948 from the University of California, Berkeley (UC Berkeley). In 1949 he was an assistant professor of plant pathology and an assistant plant pathologist at the Experiment Station, Berkeley. Wilhelm remained on the faculty of UC Berkeley until he retired as professor emeritus. He was a Guggenheim Fellow for the academic year 1958–1959.

Stephen Wilhelm worked closely with California growers of strawberries, cotton, olives, bush berries, and raspberries, as well as other scientists working with these crops, and became known for his research on controlling Verticillium wilt. He was a pioneer of the use of chloropicrin and the introduction of multiple cultivars for controlling plant diseases. He studied all the aspects of microbiology related to maintaining a healthy rhizosphere.

The commercial success of soil fumigation and the strawberry industry owe much to his investigation of soil pathogens and their relationship with host root systems.

Wilhelm was the author or co-author of over 300 scientific articles. For many years at Berkeley, he taught a course The Principles of Plant Pathology, emphasizing the history of particular plant diseases and contrasting past methods of control with present methods of control. Wilhelm and James E. Sagen wrote A History of the Strawberry from Ancient Gardens to Modern Markets (1974, University of California Press). After retiring from U.C. Berkeley as professor emeritus, Wilhelm became the chief raspberry breeder for the Sweet Briar Company, which later became a part of Driscoll Strawberries, Inc., now called Driscoll's, Inc.

At the time of his death, more than 50% of the fresh raspberries consumed in the United States were produced from cultivars developed by Dr. Wilhelm.

Upon his death he was survived by his widow and two sons.

== Selected publications ==
- Wilhelm, Stephen (1947). "The Dual Phenomenon in the Dermatophytes". Mycologia. 39 (6): 716–724. doi:10.1080/00275514.1947.12017648. PMID 18895497.
- ——; Koch, Edward C. (June 1956). "Verticillium wilt controlled: Chloropicrin achieves effective control of Verticillium wilt in strawberry plantings if properly applied as soil fumigant". California Agriculture. 10 (6): 3–14.
- ——; Nelson, Paul E. (1957). "Some anatomic aspects of the strawberry root". Hilgardia. 26 (15): 631–642. doi:10.3733/hilg.v26n15p631.
- —— (1961). Diseases of strawberry: A guide for the commercial grower. Circular / University of California, College of Agriculture, Agricultural Experiment Station; 494. Division of Agricultural Sciences, University of California.
- —— (1966). "Chemical treatments and inoculum potential of soil". Annual Review of Phytopathology. 4 (1): 53–78. doi:10.1146/annurev.py.04.090166.000413.
- ——; Nelson, Paul E.; Thomas, Harold E.; Johnson, Harold (1972). "Pathology of strawberry root rot caused by Ceratobasidium species" (PDF). Phytopathology. 62 (6): 700–705. doi:10.1094/Phyto-62-700.
- —— (1973). "Principles of biological control of soil-borne plant diseases". Soil Biology and Biochemistry. 5 (6): 729–737. doi:10.1016/0038-0717(73)90017-5.
- —— (1974). "The Garden Strawberry: A Study of Its Origin: Hardy and prolific New World species contributed to the development of the strawberry's exceptional quality, productivity, and adaptability". American Scientist. 62 (3): 264–271. JSTOR 27844880.
- ——; Tietz, Helga (1978). "Julius Kuehn—His Concept of Plant Pathology". Annual Review of Phytopathology. 16 (1): 343–358. doi:10.1146/annurev.py.16.090178.002015.
- —— (1981). "Sources and genetics of host resistance in field and fruit crops". In Mace, Marshall E.; Bell, Alois A.; Beckman, Carl H. (eds.). Fungal Wilt Diseases of Plants. Academic Press. pp. 299–376. ISBN 9780323143912.

== Patents ==
- Wilhelm, Stephen. "Joe mello" red raspberry. U.S. Patent Application 07/016,231, filed December 27, 1988".
- ——. "Hybrid raspberry cv. " Hollins"." U.S. Patent Application 07/713,704, filed November 10, 1992".
- ——. "Hybrid raspberry cv. " Lawrence"." U.S. Patent Application 07/713,952, filed November 3, 1992".
- ——; Fear, Carlos D. "Raspberry plant cv. " Wilhelm"." U.S. Patent Application 08/428,644, filed October 8, 1996".
