= Hasan Babay =

Somali footballer (born 1992)

Personal information
- Full name: Hasan Ali Roble Babay
- Date of birth: 17 April 1995 (age 31)
- Place of birth: Kismayo, Somalia
- Height: 1.83 m (6 ft 0 in)
- Position: Defender

Senior career*
Years	Team	Apps	(Gls)
2012-2020	Elman		(2)

International career
2010s	Somalia	10	(0)
- * Club domestic league appearances and goals

Hasan Babay (born 1 June 1992) is a Somali international footballer. During the early 2010s, Babay played for the Somali under-23 team. Since the mid-2010s, Babay has been acting as a spokesperson with regards to the strategy of the Somali national football team. At club level, Babay has solely represented local Somali clubs, particularly as a defender for Elman FC; he cited insecurity concerns during the mid-2010s stint. He has served as the captain of the Somali national team since the mid-2010s, becoming the longest continuously serving Somali player to do so.
