= Faisal Aden =

Somali basketball player (born 1989)

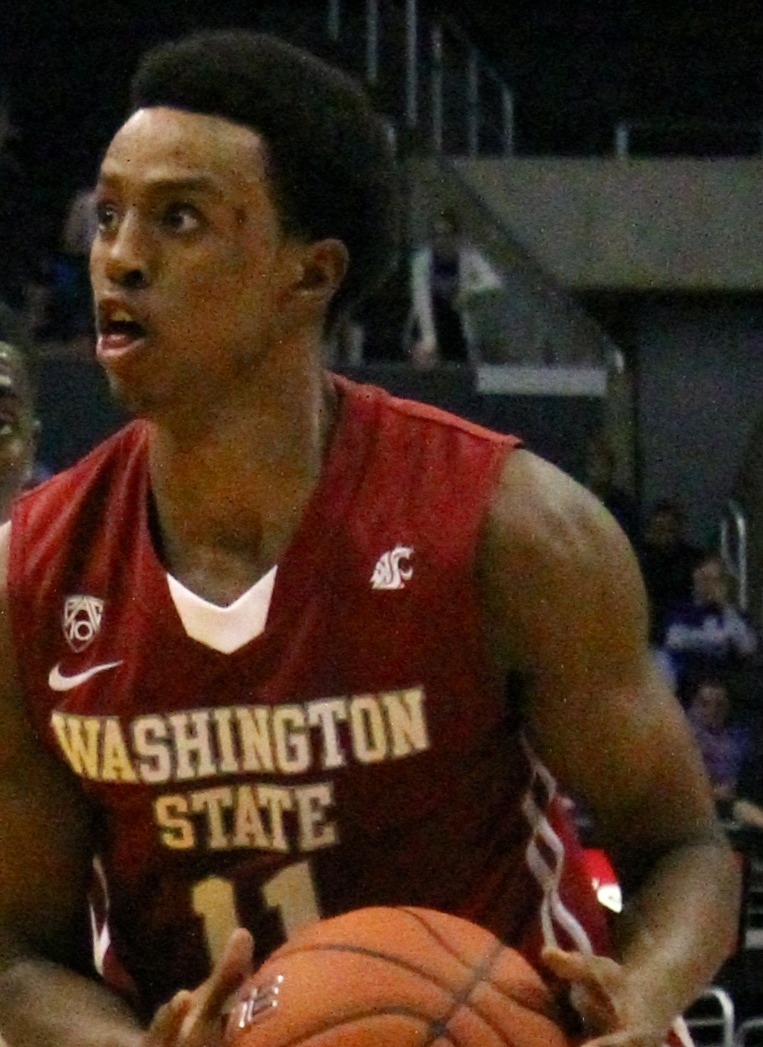
- Aden played for Washington State at the 2011 Pac-10 tournament.

Personal information
- Born: January 1, 1989 (age 37) Mogadishu, Somalia
- Listed height: 6 ft 5 in (1.96 m)
- Listed weight: 190 lb (86 kg)

Career information
- High school: Bowie (Arlington, Texas); God's Academy (Dallas, Texas)
- College: Hillsborough CC (2008–2010); Washington State (2010–2012)
- NBA draft: 2012: undrafted
- Playing career: 2012–2019
- Position: Shooting guard

Career history
- 2013: Acea Virtus Roma
- 2019: KPA

Faisal Aden (born January 1, 1989) is a Somali professional basketball player.

== Pro career ==
After going undrafted in 2012 NBA draft, he signed with the Leuven Bears in Basketball League Belgium but was cut due to failing a physical. In November, Aden was selected in the 2012 NBA Development League Draft by the Golden State Warriors' D-League affiliate Santa Cruz Warriors as the 13th pick in the 3rd round. He was shortly traded to the Texas Legends. After appearing in one preseason game with the Legends, Aden was waived.

On February 16, 2013, Aden signed a contract with the Italian powerhouse Virtus Roma. Two months later, Aden left Virtus Roma. During the following preseason, he was part of the German BBL team of SC Rasta Vechta, but was cut from the team shortly before the 2013–14 season's start.

In 2019, Aden was on the roster of Kenyan club KPA during the 2021 BAL Qualifying Tournaments. On December 19, he scored 20 points in the 79–76 win against Ferroviário de Maputo.

== International career ==
Aden was born in Somalia and moved to San Diego when he was seven years old. He opted to represent his country of birth, Somalia national basketball team. On January 25, 2013, he scored 59 points in an 83-86 loss versus Rwanda during the 2013 FIBA Africa Championship qualification.
