= List of churches in the Diocese of Buffalo =

This is a list of current and former Roman Catholic churches in the Roman Catholic Diocese of Buffalo, US.

== Buffalo ==
=== Current churches ===
Name	Image	Location	Parish founded	Church built	Architect	Description/Notes
Assumption		435 Amherst St.	1888	1914	Schmill & Gould	Chronologically Buffalo's third Polish Catholic parish, Assumption was founded to serve the then-newly established Polish enclave in the eastern part of the Black Rock neighborhood, who felt unwelcome at the predominantly-German St. Francis Xavier and for whom the established parishes of St. Stanislaus and St. Adalbert were too distant. The interior features a painted wood ceiling and original artwork by Hungarian-born artist József Varga, and is also the site of the earliest American examples of the sgraffito work of Polish-born muralist Józef Sławiński, executed in 1960. Became home to the congregations of the former St. Elizabeth, St. Francis Xavier, and St. John the Baptist parishes upon their 2007 dissolution as part of the "Journey in Faith and Grace" consolidation program, leaving Assumption the only remaining Catholic church in Black Rock.
Blessed Sacrament		1025 Delaware Ave.	1887; reconstituted 1976	1889; enlarged 1908	Adolphus Druiding (original structure); Albert A. Post (1908 enlargement)	Began as a chapel built in 1885 connected to new bishop's residence; services held there were well attended especially by German-Americans from the nearby neighborhood of Cold Spring who had no nearby Catholic church to attend; was made a parish in its own right two years later. Building was slated for a second expansion in 1912 when diocese announced plans to build new cathedral on adjacent lot, to accommodate which the building was lifted from its foundation and rolled 200 feet backward from its original position next to the street; at the time the largest brick church in the U.S. to ever be physically moved. Church is Gothic Revival in style and built of brick and Medina sandstone; interior contains stained glass windows crafted in Innsbruck as well as a pair of altars imported from Italy; one of marble salvaged from then-recently demolished Church of San Salvatore in Thermis, blessed in 590 AD by Pope Gregory the Great and containing a number of relics including pieces of the Holy Cross; the other dating to the 17th century and sourced from the chapel of a church in Rome. Parish dissolved upon completion of new cathedral in 1915 with church building serving as its chapel; reconstituted upon cathedral's demolition.
Blessed Trinity		317 Leroy Ave.	1906	1928	Oakley & Schallmo	Originally a mixed Irish and German congregation in a neighborhood then known as the Jammerthal ("valley of woe", so named for its rocky, impossible-to-cultivate soil), Blessed Trinity is most notable for its architecture, having been described as "the finest example of Lombard Romanesque architecture in North America", with multicolored brickwork, exquisite terra cotta ornamentation including 572 decorative corbels depicting "the vices, virtues, graces, sacraments and commandments of the Catholic faith", and an overall design inspired by Pavia Cathedral and the Church of St. Trophime in Arles. Accordingly, it was named a Buffalo city landmark in 1977 and added to the National Register of Historic Places in 1978.
Coronation of the Blessed Virgin Mary		374 Dewitt St.	1950	1956	Mortimer J. Murphy	Upper West Side parish whose territory was cleaved off that of Annunciation and Nativity; congregation met for six years in the former Ellen Terry Theatre on Grant Street before the dedication of their current church building. Spared from the spate of mergers that characterized the early-2000s "Journey in Faith and Grace" consolidation program due to its status as home of Western New York's Vietnamese Catholic community; Mass is still held in both Vietnamese and English.
Corpus Christi		199 Clark St.	1898	1909	Schmill & Gould	The seventh of what would ultimately be fourteen Catholic churches serving Buffalo's Polish-American community, founded due to the rapid population growth in the Broadway-Fillmore neighborhood in the late 19th and early 20th century; however, Corpus Christi's growth stalled in 1929, when 300 homes within the parish's boundaries were demolished to make way for the massive New York Central Terminal. Architecturally, the building is a fine example of Rundbogenstil-influenced Romanesque Revival architecture constructed with Hummelstown brownstone, but is most notable for the exquisite art and statuary in its interior: stained glass windows by Franz Mayer & Co. depicting Polish saints; six fresco paintings on the wall of the clerestory depicting Marian shrines in Poland; a reproduction of Raphael's Disputation of the Holy Sacrament in the semidome of the apse. The church was listed on the National Register of Historic Places in 2007 and is also a contributing property to the locally-landmarked Broadway-Fillmore Historic District, established in 2018.
Holy Cross		140 7th St.	1914	1915; enlarged 1931 and 1938	Pascal Cimini, George Dietel (1938 expansion)	Parish founded due to northward expansion of Buffalo's West Side Italian-American community; congregation met in former home of West Side Presbyterian Church on Busti Avenue while present church was under construction on a plot of land formerly owned by the Sisters of Mercy. Church sports Gothic design elements typical of the architecture of the era; was dedicated by Father Nelson Baker. 1930s-era expansions to building increased its capacity to 1,200 parishioners. Interior features numerous statues of the Madonna, many brought by immigrants from their former churches in Italy, as well as mural paintings by artist Luigi Avoglio.
Holy Spirit		85 Dakota St.	1910	1930	Edward J. Trautman	First parish to serve North Park section of city; congregation remained small initially, though shrine to Saint Rita installed in 1913 made it a notable local pilgrimage site; growth began in earnest at outbreak of First World War due to increased production at nearby automobile and airplane factories connected to war effort. Original frame church sold to Methodist congregation, who moved it to the corner of Delaware Avenue and Wilbury Place (still extant, now home to New Freedom Assembly of God); current building is Modernist in style with simplified Gothic Revival detailing. Linked with St. Margaret church in 2012 after retirement of the latter's priest; both remain independent parishes but now share the same priest.
Our Lady of Charity		1901 S. Park Ave. (Holy Family site), 260 Okell St. (St. Ambrose site and parish office)	2010	1908 (Holy Family site), 1950 (St. Ambrose site); as home of their respective predecessor parishes	Lansing & Beierl (Holy Family site), Foit & Baschnagel (St. Ambrose site)	Parish founded in 2010 from the merger of three South Buffalo parishes: Holy Family, St. Ambrose, and St. Agatha. Both of the former churches are still used for services; the St. Agatha complex was used by the parish for various purposes and once housed a Head Start preschool, but was sold to a private developer in 2018.
Our Lady of Hope		18 Greenwood Pl.	2009	1901 (as home of predecessor parish Annunciation)	Albert A. Post	Formed from merger of three West Side parishes: Nativity of the Blessed Virgin Mary, Our Lady of Loretto, and Annunciation. The parish conducts services out of the latter's Gothic Revival former home.
Our Lady of Perpetual Help		115 O'Connell St.	1897	1900	Lansing & Beierl	The third chronologically, and only remaining, Catholic parish in Buffalo's Old First Ward, carved out of the territory of St. Brigid and St. Stephen parishes due to persistent population growth in this working-class Irish-American community; many early parishioners worked as scoopers at the nearby grain elevators. Nicknamed "Pet's". Was for many years the traditional endpoint of Buffalo's St. Patrick's Day parade, as well as the first (temporary) home to Bishop Timon-St. Jude High School from 1946-48. A magnificent Gothic Revival building faced in Medina sandstone, with a cruciform floor plan and an imposing but steepleless tower on the west side of the façade (the original design called for one, but it was never completed).
St. Anthony of Padua		160 Court St.	1888	1891; enlarged 1904	Michael Sheehan	First Italian Catholic church in Buffalo, serving a community that began arriving in the 1870s, attracted by employment opportunities in waterfront industries on the Lower West Side of the city. The parish became the social center of the local Italian diaspora, and still hosts one Italian-language Sunday Mass a week. The Romanesque Revival style of the exterior contrasts with a Renaissance-inspired interior featuring fresco paintings and marble work by notable ecclesiastical decorator Cesari Antozzi.
St. Casimir		160 Cable St.	1890	1929	Oakley & Schallmo	Parish served initially small and isolated Polish community along Clinton Street near the city line which began to grow rapidly after turn of century; original frame church replaced consecutively by larger one in 1908 and even larger current building for which ground was broken in 1926; Byzantine Revival design inspired by Rev. Anthony Majewski's travels to the Near East and desire for church architecturally unlike any other in the diocese. Brightly-colored façade features ornate terra cotta detailing by associate architect Joseph Fronczak: relief sculpture above entrance depicting Saint Casimir distributing alms to the needy, painted statues of Saints Adalbert and Hyacinth below deeply recessed rose window, Christ the King flanked by angels at top of front gable; interior contains hand-carved statues of Twelve Apostles placed atop monumental columns and Botticino marble altar crowned by 65-foot arch. Merged with St. Bernard as part of 2000s-'10s parish consolidation program, and was used as an oratory "providing for the spiritual care... particularly those of Polish descent" within the congregation. Named a Buffalo city landmark in 1977. It was designated as a free-standing church within the diocese of Buffalo in 2011.
SS. Columba-Brigid		75 Hickory St.	1987	2006	George Lukaszewicz	Founded through the merger of St. Columba and St. Brigid parishes, the latter of whose church had burned in a 1968 fire; the merged parish met in the former St. Columba church until it, too, burned in 2004. Began sharing ministry team and pooling resources with St. Ann and St. Mary of Sorrows in 1992 as part of reorganization of "central city" parishes before ultimately absorbing both. Their current home is the newest Catholic church building in Buffalo; its construction was controversial given the then-ongoing trend of church closures and parish mergers throughout the city, leaving many architecturally significant buildings vacant and at risk of demolition. The merged SS. Columba-Brigid is notable as the home parish of Sister Karen Klimczak, co-founder of the Bissonnette House, a halfway home for former prisoners named after a Buffalo priest who was murdered by a vagrant in 1987, and who was herself murdered in 2006 by one of the house's residents.
St. Joseph Cathedral		50 Franklin St.	1847	1855	Patrick Keely	Founded in 1847 along with the Diocese of Buffalo itself, which was cleaved off the western portion of the territory of the Archdiocese of New York; construction work began in 1851 after Bishop John Timon's request to use St. Louis as the cathedral church was rebuffed on ethnic grounds (St. Louis's congregation was majority German-American, Timon of Irish descent), and concluded 1863. The building sports a French Gothic-influenced style; its carillon was produced by Bollée Brothers of France and was once considered among the world's best; the interior dates to a 1977 renovation and contains a 3,627-pipe Hook & Hastings organ originally displayed at the 1876 Centennial Exposition in Philadelphia. Basement crypt serves as the final resting place of Bishop Timon as well as three of his successors in that office: Stephen Ryan, Charles Colton, and Edward Head. The building lost its title as seat of the Diocese in 1915 with the construction of the new cathedral on Delaware Avenue but regained it in 1976, when the latter church was demolished. St. Joseph is a contributing property to the locally-landmarked Joseph Ellicott Historic District, established in 1982.
St. Joseph University Parish		3269 Main St.	1849	1926	Bley & Lyman	One of the oldest parishes in Buffalo despite its location far from downtown in what was initially the rural hamlet of Elyville; congregation in its early years comprised farmers largely of French and German extraction, and was led alternately by Jesuits who travelled to the parish from St. Michael, itinerant Redemptorist preachers from the North Bush chapel in present-day Tonawanda (including for a time the future Saint John Neumann), and generally a revolving door of ministers at a rate of a new one every couple of years. Stability and growth came with urbanization, the first signs of which began to appear at the end of the 19th century; original wood-framed country church was replaced in 1894 with a larger brick structure, and that in turn with the present building. Church sports a magnificent Norman Gothic Revival design; interior sanctuary is decorated with mural paintings of the life of St. Joseph executed in 1968 by artist George Raggi; altarpiece and statuary imported from Pietrasanta, Italy. Known locally for the diversity of its congregation and, relative to other area Catholic churches, its inclusive atmosphere.
St. Katharine Drexel		133 N. Ogden St.	2007	1960 (as home of predecessor parish St. Francis of Assisi)	Albert A. Rumschick	Parish formed under the auspices of the "Journey in Faith and Grace" consolidation program from the merger of St. Agnes, Visitation, and St. Francis of Assisi, using the church building formerly belonging to the latter parish.
St. Louis		35 Edward St.	1829 (as Lamb of God)	1889	Schickel & Ditmars	The earliest Catholic church in Buffalo; given its current name in 1843 after the parish split along ethnic lines (thus giving rise to a longstanding tradition in the Buffalo diocese), with St. Patrick's (Irish), St. Mary Redemptorist (German), and St. Peter's French Church (later Our Lady of Lourdes) seceding during that decade. The current Gothic-style, Medina sandstone building is the third to house the church, completed in 1889; it's most notable for its spire, rising 245 feet above the ground and with a design inspired by those of Cologne Cathedral in Germany, it's reputed to be the tallest open-work spire ever built of unreinforced stone, and the tallest ever built in the United States. The interior contains a Seth Thomas clock donated by Elbridge Gerry Spaulding, a 1903 Kimball organ that was previously housed in the Temple of Music during the Pan-American Exposition of 1901, a marble altarpiece carved by the Lautz Marble Works featuring a life-size statue of Saint Louis IX of France, and stained glass by both the Royal Munich Art Institute and the Reister & Frohe company of Buffalo. The church was named a Buffalo city landmark in 1978 and is also a contributing property to the National Register of Historic Places-listed Allentown Historic District, established in 1980.
St. Margaret		1395 Hertel Ave.	1916	1958	Mortimer J. Murphy	Bishop Dennis Dougherty named the parish in honor of the late Margaret Bingham, sister of the previous bishop Charles Colton, fulfilling the latter's wishes. Current (third) church building dates to 1958 and was designed in a simplified Gothic Revival style with Modernist influences. Predecessor church, erected 1919, was renovated with a Modernist façade upon construction of the current one and housed the parochial school until its closure in 2012; it's now a luxury apartment building, dubbed The Cornelius. Statuary on church grounds depicts Madonna and child as well as Padre Pio of Pietralcina, who is also honored with a small chapel at the east end of the narthex. Stained glass is the work of Jozef Mazur. Linked with Holy Spirit church in 2012; both remain independent parishes but now share the same priest.
St. Mark		415 Woodward Ave.	1908	1917; tower added 1954	Albert A. Post	Parish serves Parkside neighborhood and is a contributing property to National Register of Historic Places-listed Parkside East Historic District. Most notable for its architecture; built of Indiana limestone; simplified Gothic Revival design is reminiscent of 15th-century English parish churches. Open, pillarless floor plan in nave, with decorative tile flooring and wainscoting. Linked with St. Rose of Lima church in 2010 as part of diocesan consolidation program; both remain independent parishes but now share the same priest. School remains in operation and ranks among top-rated private elementary schools in Western New York.
St. Martin de Porres		555 Northampton St.	1993	2000		Founded as a merger of the four defunct parishes of Our Lady of Lourdes, St. Boniface, St. Benedict the Moor, and St. Matthew, St. Martin de Porres is the only Catholic church in the Buffalo diocese with a majority-black congregation, and one of only 50 such churches in the United States. The church has its own gospel choir, and its Parish Center is planned to be the future home of the Buffalo African-American Catholic Gospel Music Resource and Recording Center.
St. Martin of Tours		1130 Abbott Rd.	1926	1958	Backus, Crane & Love	Church built on a plot of land given to the diocese by the Kinsey Real Estate Company free of charge on the condition that they use it for that purpose, then a common tactic among developers seeking to attract home buyers to newly urbanizing neighborhoods. In 2008, as part of the "Journey in Faith and Grace" restructuring program, the diocese "linked" St. Martin of Tours with St. Thomas Aquinas; they remain independent parishes but now share a pastor.
St. Michael		651 Washington St.	1851	1867; tower added 1876	Patrick Keely	Founded by an Alsatian faction that seceded from St. Louis due to dispute over parish finances; church was built on a site that had earlier been considered for the construction of St. Joseph's Cathedral and was operated by the Jesuits, who established Canisius College there in 1870. Building is Romanesque in style, built with a basilica-style floor plan using locally quarried sandstone and limestone. The interior was completely reconstructed after a 1963 fire caused by a lightning strike to the tower and now features a sanctuary with a Modernist-style crucifix and various statuary depicting Saint Michael the Archangel.
St. Rose of Lima		500 Parker Ave.	1926	1965	Leroy H. Welch	Founded due to increased urbanization in the western portion of the North Park neighborhood and long distance to other Catholic churches. Upon completion of current church, original 1926 building was repurposed as the parochial school, which closed in 2007; Carmelite nuns also had a convent on the property. Linked with St. Mark church in 2010 as part of diocesan consolidation program; both remain independent parishes but now share the same priest. Most notable for its architecture, belonging to the New Formalist school, wherein traditional elements of church design (T-shaped floor plan, tower, stained glass) are reinterpreted according to Modernist aesthetics. Added to the National Register of Historic Places in 2017.
St. Stanislaus, Bishop and Martyr		348 Peckham St.	1873	1886; towers added 1908	T. O. Sullivan; Schmill & Gould (towers)	Known as the "Mother Church of Polonia", founded by developer Joseph Bork for explicit purpose of attracting a Polish-American community to Buffalo; Rev. Jan Pitass was recruited as Buffalo's first Polish-speaking priest. Was the first of fourteen Polish Catholic parishes in Buffalo, seven of which were located in the Broadway-Fillmore neighborhood, and had become the largest in the country by 1905, with nearly 20,000 members and 2,000 students in the parochial school. Church built in Romanesque Revival style of locally-quarried flint and limestone; twin steeples rise to a height of 120 feet; statues above buttresses date to 1910 and depict Saints Adalbert of Prague, Hyacinth of Poland, and Matthew the Apostle. Interior is richly decorated with statuary and mural paintings. and contains a restored 1893 Johnson pipe organ.
St. Teresa		1970 Seneca St.	1897	1900; enlarged 1926	Albert A. Post	The first Catholic church in the city south of the Buffalo River, established in the wake of a building boom touched off by real estate speculator William Fitzpatrick and catering to a new Irish-American middle class who sought to escape the crowded and crime-ridden conditions of established Irish neighborhoods closer to downtown. Fitzpatrick offered his own home for use as the rectory; it was moved from its original location at the corner of Bailey Avenue. Church is built of rock-faced Medina sandstone in the Late Victorian Gothic style, with the Queen Anne-style rectory and International-style parish hall providing interesting architectural contrast. Listed on the National Register of Historic Places in 2016.

=== Former churches ===
Name	Image	Location	Parish founded	Church built	Architect	Parish defunct	Description/Notes
All Saints		127 Chadduck Ave.	1911	1938	Bley & Lyman	2024	Original church destroyed by fire in March 1913; services were held in the basement of the parochial school until the current Colonial Revival-style building was complete. The church contains a 1923 Wurlitzer Organ gifted by Ellsworth Statler; it had earlier been installed in the golden ballroom of the Hotel Statler in downtown Buffalo. The parish closed in July 2024.
Annunciation		18 Greenwood Pl.	1885	1901	Albert A. Post	2009	The first of what would ultimately be three Roman Catholic parishes on Buffalo's Upper West Side, Annunciation was founded at a time when the neighborhood was only just beginning to urbanize, and in turn its foundation led to the coalescence of a sizable Irish-American community in its environs. With time, the parish's ethnic constitution evolved from Irish-majority to Italian to Hispanic. Merged in 2009 with the neighboring parishes of Our Lady of Loretto and Nativity under the new name Our Lady of Hope, which continues to meet in Annunciation's former home. The former parochial school building was added to the National Register of Historic Places in 2008.
Holy Angels		348 Porter Ave.	1852	1859; enlarged 1874 and 1894	unknown	2020	One of Buffalo's earliest Catholic parishes, established by the Missionary Oblates of Mary Immaculate to serve as the parish church connected to the new Catholic College of Buffalo, a seminary for the training of priests. The building was repeatedly enlarged and altered over the years: the transept, sanctuary, and choir were added in 1874, the chapel on the west side of the building facing Fargo Avenue in 1894, and the interior was redesigned in 1898 and again in 1953, with hand-carved Stations of the Cross imported from Switzerland and new stained-glass windows depicting the Mysteries of the Rosary and Marian apparitions, respectively, added at those times. The parish population began to decline in the 1960s, and, citing financial difficulties, the Diocese of Buffalo closed the church in July 2020 and merged the parish with Holy Cross on Maryland Street and Our Lady of Hope on Greenwood Place.
Holy Apostles SS. Peter & Paul		807 Clinton St.	1909	1909	Schmill & Gould	2007	Parish initially served an East Side Polish-American community employed principally in the factories of the Larkin Soap Company as well as in the stockyards. Colonial-style church was reconstructed after severe damage caused by a December 1921 fire; was the only wooden building in Buffalo in use as a Catholic church at the time of the parish's dissolution due to merger with St. Valentine, St. Stephen, Precious Blood, and SS. Rita and Patrick. Later used as headquarters of Peaceprints Prison Ministries. The church building fell into disrepair and was demolished in 2024.
Holy Family		1901 South Park Ave.	1902	1908	Lansing & Beierl	2010	Parish founded due to rapid population growth in South Buffalo connected with the opening of the Lackawanna Steel Plant just south of the city line. Described as one of the finest examples of Romanesque Revival church architecture in Buffalo; the interior murals (the work of Danish artist Holvag Rambusch) depict scenes from the Book of Kells and the Lindisfarne Gospels, reflective of the traditionally Irish-American ethnic makeup of the congregation, while the sanctuary windows came from the Tiroler Glasmalerei company of Innsbruck. Merged with St. Ambrose and St. Agatha under the auspices of the diocese's "Journey in Faith and Grace" consolidation program to form the new Our Lady of Charity parish; the building still hosts two Sunday masses a week as well as midweek Masses on Monday and Friday.
Holy Name of Jesus		1947 Bailey Ave.	1887	1905	Cyrus K. Porter & Son	2005	Parish served a community of German-Americans, bilingual in English and their native language and largely employed by the railroads that crisscrossed this part of the East Side; original wood-framed church was repurposed for use as parochial school upon completion of the present building and served as such until construction of present school building (1913). Church is in Gothic style, built of St. Lawrence granite and undressed ashlar; steeple atop tower at north end of main façade was removed c. 2009. Interior is intimately proportioned and features a stained glass window in the loft depicting the Holy Family. Parish was one of the first to be dissolved in the diocese's "Journey in Faith and Grace" consolidation program. Now home of New Life Harvest Church of God in Christ.
Immaculate Conception		150 Edward St.	1849	1900; expanded 1925	Max Beierl	2005	Land donated to diocese in 1839 by heirs of prominent citizen Louis LeCouteulx de Caumont for establishment of an English-speaking parish for the city's Irish-American community; that parish (Old St. Patrick's) was instead sited downtown whereupon property reverted to ownership of LeCouteulx's heirs per terms of donation; diocese regained ownership in 1849 whereupon parish was finally established. Small wood frame church was replaced with larger brick building in 1856 and in turn with present Gothic-style building. Church closed in 2005 due to declining enrollment simultaneously with, but unrelated to, diocese's "Journey in Faith and Grace" parish consolidation program. Now undergoing conversion to Assembly House 150, a "for-profit design and building studio that will help foster a new crop of buildings in the city". Building is a contributing property to the National Register of Historic Places-listed Allentown Historic District, established in 1980.
Immaculate Heart of Mary		375 Edison Ave.	1946	1947	unknown	2009	Parish founded to serve the residents of the new Langfield Homes, a public housing project that was erected in the 1940s in the Far East Side on some of the last remaining vacant land in the city and intended as housing for workers in World War II-related industries and, later, for returning veterans and their families. Modernist-style building originally served function of both worship space and social hall; school building next door built in 1950. A rather short-lived parish by diocesan standards; by 2006, three years before the parish's merger with neighboring St. Aloysius Gonzaga in Cheektowaga as part of the final phase of the diocese's "Journey in Faith and Grace" consolidation program, parish population had dwindled to only 160 families. Now Greater Faith Bible Tabernacle, a Pentecostal church with a mostly black congregation.
Nativity of the Blessed Virgin Mary		228 Albany St.	1898	1901	Albert A. Post	2009	Parish founded due to continued population growth on Buffalo's Upper West Side; congregation was initially made up largely of members of newly minted Irish-American middle class relocated from cramped and squalid environs of the First Ward, Buffalo's traditional Irish enclave; as the 20th century wore on, the congregation, along with the neighborhood as a whole, became Italian-majority and later Hispanic. Church is built of Medina sandstone and "controls its corner site with its Gothic exuberance", with notable trefoil patterns in the tracery of the windows above the entrances. Interior once contained an 1853 Hall & Labaugh organ, among the oldest of any church in Buffalo, originally owned by a parish in Yonkers and reinstalled in Buffalo in 1911. As part of diocese's "Journey in Faith and Grace" program, merged with Our Lady of Loretto and Annunciation to form the new Our Lady of Hope parish, which meets in the latter's former church.
Our Lady of Loretto		158 15th St.	1924	1951	Chester Oakley	2009	Parish founded in response to the announcement of a new Presbyterian mission church nearby, which the Buffalo Diocese feared would make inroads among the heavily Catholic Italian community on the West Side of the city. The congregation met in the former Bethany Presbyterian Church until 1949, whereupon construction of the current building began. Our Lady of Loretto merged in 2009 with Nativity and Annunciation parishes, taking on the name Our Lady of Hope, which continues in existence in the former home of the latter. Church building is the final major work of noted Buffalo ecclesiastical architect Chester Oakley, executed in a Modernist style with some elements of late-period Art Deco ornamentation. Occupying the building today is Destiny Church International, a Pentecostal church with a majority-Hispanic congregation.
Our Lady of Lourdes		1109 Main St.	1850 (as St. Peter's French Catholic Church)	1900	A. E. Minks & Sons	1993	Founded as one of the four daughter congregations of Lamb of God, Buffalo's first Catholic parish; worshiped in several sites downtown before constructing the Main Street church, whereupon they took on their ultimate name. Built of Medina sandstone in a style described as "a happy blending of the Romanesque and Renaissance, the Romanesque largely prevailing" and with a relative paucity of exterior ornamentation; inside was initially similarly austere but later sported mural paintings by Italian artist Carlo Antonia Nisita. Owing to the small size of Buffalo's Franco-American community, congregation never grew to match the ample size of their building as many others of the era did; much of its excess space ended up being used for social and athletic facilities open to neighborhood residents, including basketball courts, event space, and a bowling alley. Parish merged with St. Matthew, St. Boniface, and St. Benedict the Moor under the name St. Martin de Porres. The building is currently being remodeled by Ellicott Development into a mix of retail, restaurant, office and residential space.
Our Lady of Mount Carmel		41 Fly St.	1906	1906	unknown	1949	Combination church/school building also contained living space for clergy, lacking a separate rectory; served the poor Sicilian immigrant population of the Canal District, a notorious slum; nonetheless, parade and festival held annually in July on feast of parish's namesake was locally renowned tradition. Parish population peaked at about 1,000 in the 1920s but then declined as those neighborhood residents who could afford better housing began to leave for the Lower West Side; natural gas explosion in 1936 brought local government's attention to poor living conditions in tenements, accelerating exodus from Canal District. Only 90 families remained in parish at the time of its dissolution, immediately following which the church along with the rest of the neighborhood was demolished in what was reputedly one of the first slum clearance schemes in the U.S. The Marine Drive Apartments occupy the site today.
Precious Blood		145 Lewis St.	1898	1899	Albert A. Post	2007	Gothic Revival church building once contained a mural of Christ the King painted in the 1920s by ecclesiastical artist Jozef Mazur on the semidome of the apse. Parish initially comprised a community of mostly Irish- and German-Americans working in the Jacob Dold Packing Plant and similar businesses around the Buffalo stockyards, but was Polish-majority by c. 1910 as that ethnicity came to dominate the meatpacking industry. The Felician Franciscan Sisters were in charge of the school, and a convent was built for them on the property in 1964. The parish merged in 2007 with St. Valentine, St. Stephen, Holy Apostles SS. Peter and Paul, and SS. Rita and Patrick and vacated the building at that time. Now home to an African-American Baptist congregation.
Queen of Peace		1955 Genesee St.	1920	1928	Dietel & Wade	2007	Parish originally served a Polish-American community that, in the years immediately after World War I, had migrated north from the city's main Polish enclave in Broadway-Fillmore. Notable for its architecture; building is in Late Gothic Revival style with a façade of Ohio sandstone accented with Indiana limestone and a floor plan unlike any other Catholic church in Buffalo; a cross-shaped, multipurpose structure encompassing a rectory to the west, a school building to the east, and the worship space itself extending north-to-south between them. Interior once decorated with mural paintings by Jozef Mazur, now painted over. Parish dissolved in wake of the diocese's "Journey in Faith and Grace" parish consolidation program; was purchased in 2009 and is now a mosque and Islamic community center; Jesuit-run parochial school on site remained open for some time thereafter.
Queen of the Most Holy Rosary		1040 Sycamore St.	1913	1917	Władysław Zawadzki	1993	Parish was established by the Buffalo Diocese as a pretext to acquiring the church building formerly belonging to Holy Mother of the Rosary at a foreclosure auction; they were a renegade "independent Catholic" church that, due to longstanding disagreements within the congregation of St. Adalbert, seceded in 1895 not only from the parish but from the Diocese itself; they later aligned with the Polish National Catholic Church. Current building was constructed after Holy Mother of the Rosary won its church back in a subsequent lawsuit. Architecturally, the building is an example of Zawadzki's signature quasi-French Renaissance style with some Gothic Revival elements added. After the parish's 1993 merger with St. Adalbert's Basilica, the building was purchased by Darul Uloom Al-Madania Islamic Seminary for use as its girls' school, known as Darul Rasheed; ironically, they also own the original Holy Mother of the Rosary building too, which is now their mosque.
Sacred Heart		200 Emslie St.	1875	1915	Schmill & Gould	1973	Parish originally served German-American community that had gathered in the Hydraulics neighborhood; worshiped initially in various temporary locations then built a church on Seneca Street in what later became the midst of the Larkin Soap Company's factory complex. Larkin purchased original church in 1912 to facilitate expansion of their operations, whereupon it was vacated by the congregation. Present church built of brick and Ohio sandstone in the Late Gothic Revival style with an imposing tripartite clerestory; complex also included a school, rectory, and Franciscan convent surrounding a courtyard. After parish dissolution, served variously as home to a Ukrainian Orthodox church and Witness Cathedral of Faith; now vacant. School and rectory demolished in 2008 and 2017 respectively; convent and church still extant as of 2019 but at risk of demolition by neglect.
St. Adalbert Basilica		208 Stanislaus St.	1886	1891	Raymond Huber	2011	Second Polish Catholic parish in Buffalo, founded due to overcrowding at St. Stanislaus. Originally envisioned as center of master-planned community including a park, home for the aged, and immigration house; plan abandoned when original church burned down. Infighting among parishioners in 1880s and '90s led to high turnover of pastors and schism leading to foundation of "independent Catholic" parish Holy Mother of the Rosary, later affiliated with Polish National Catholic Church. First church in the United States to be named a basilica (1907). Present church sports Romanesque and Byzantine influences and was largest in Buffalo at the time of its construction. Interior decorated with murals by Jozef Mazur completed in 1925, many of which were removed in a 1976 renovation, as well as stained glass by Franz Mayer & Co. of Munich. Parish merged with St. John Kanty and is now used by them as an oratory.
St. Agatha		65 Abbott Rd.	1909 (as All Souls)	1956	Mortimer J. Murphy	2010	Parish originally known as All Souls; founded to serve the Italian-American community that had coalesced in the western part of the Triangle neighborhood near the railroads where many of them worked, though by 1917 it had become Irish-majority. Original wood-frame church at the corner of Germania and Mystic Streets suffered damage in June 1920 when the floor caved in under the weight of the parishioners at a particularly well-attended Sunday Mass; the congregation was temporarily disbanded pending repairs and was renamed St. Agatha upon its reopening the following year. Austere design of the 1956 combination church/school is owed to the fact that the parish was traditionally small and did not have the need for, nor the financial resources to support, a large and extravagant building such as many parishes in Buffalo had at the time. Merged with Holy Family and St. Ambrose to form the new Our Lady of Charity parish, who later sold the building to developer Sam Savarino. As of 2018, the building is proposed to be converted into apartments, offices, or educational or performing arts space.
St. Agnes		194 Ludington St.	1882	1905	Esenwein & Johnson	2007	The first of what were ultimately three parishes in the neighborhood of Lovejoy, initially serving a mixed German and Irish community attracted to the area by availability of jobs on the railroad; Irish parishioners seceded in 1898 to found Visitation parish. Congregation became majority-Italian after World War II. Church is Romanesque Revival in style and one of few ever to have been designed by the otherwise prolific local firm of Esenwein & Johnson. Stained glass installed 1919-1921 was the work of Otto F. Andrle; six mural paintings by D'Arcangelo Studios once adorned the interior, five of which were removed in 1985. Parish merged with Visitation and St. Francis of Assisi to form the new St. Katharine Drexel parish, which meets in the latter's former home on North Ogden Street. Now a Buddhist temple owned by the International Sangha Bhiksu Buddhist Association.
St. Ambrose		260 Okell St.	1930	1950	Foit & Baschnagel	2010	Established from the southern part of the territory of Holy Family parish; the modest frame church constructed on the site was not replaced with a permanent structure until 1950, due to the economic hardship of the Great Depression and supplies rationing during World War II. The building was designed in a Modernist style and is most notable for its stained glass, created in 1992 by local artist Russell Vacanti; its imagery was inspired by the reforms of the Second Vatican Council and deals with themes such as socioeconomic justice, gun violence, drug abuse, interfaith relations, and others not typically seen in stained glass art. Merged with Holy Family and St. Agatha under the auspices of the diocese's "Journey in Faith and Grace" consolidation program to form the new Our Lady of Charity parish; the building still hosts two Sunday masses a week, as well as Saturday evening vigil and midweek Masses on Tuesday, Wednesday and Thursday.
St. Ann		651 Broadway	1858	1886	Brother Charles Halfmann, from drawings by Francis Himpel	2007	Founded at what was then edge of Buffalo's urbanized area under correct assumption that new church would be catalyst for outward expansion of city's East Side German community; by turn of century was largest German parish in diocese and among largest Catholic churches in the U.S.; its school was also largest in Buffalo at the time, with 1,500 students. Construction of current church began 1878 and lasted six years; was designed by assistant pastor who was also amateur architect, based on sketch drawn by a New York architect whose original design was rejected as too costly. Gothic Revival design described as most European of any church in city; walls 7 feet thick, built of steel-reinforced Lockport dolomite. West tower shorter than east due to inability of ground to support its weight; spires once rose over 200 feet above street, removed 1964 after damage due to wind storm. Interior contains stained glass by F. X. Zettler Studios of Munich, altar imported from Germany featuring painting of Saint Anne, large fresco paintings by Leo Frohe; Johnson & Son pipe organ sold for scrap in 1966. Parish began to share ministry team and pool resources with St. Mary of Sorrows and SS. Columba-Brigid in 1992 as part of reorganization of "central city" parishes but challenged outright merger with the latter as part of subsequent consolidation; latter decision reaffirmed by diocese in 2013 and by Vatican's Apostolic Signatura in 2017, though building's 2013 nomination as a Buffalo city landmark forestalled diocese's original plan to demolish it.
St. Augustine	No image available	417 Michigan Ave.	1912	between 1854 and 1872 (as private residence)	unknown	c. 1946	Short-lived mission established on the Near East Side to serve a small congregation of African-American Catholics that had heretofore worshiped at St. Joseph's Cathedral, from which the parish continued to be administered. Parish also operated a school and offered manual training classes. After dissolution of parish, building housed a nightclub, Club Savoy. Demolished shortly after 1960 as part of the same urban renewal scheme that claimed the former St. Lucy church. Site is now part of the parking lot in front of the Compass East Building.
St. Bartholomew		335 Grider St.	1912	1930	George W. Stickle	1993	Parish founded in an East Side neighborhood then newly urbanizing due to construction of a streetcar line along nearby Kensington Avenue; served an initially German-American congregation. English Gothic-style building constructed largely of cobblestones salvaged from then-recent repaving of Elm Street downtown; entrance portal and frontispiece are of Indiana limestone; interior decorated with handcrafted woodwork. Parish population peaked at 1,000 families in 1962 but fell precipitously thereafter due to demographic changes in neighborhood; school closed 1978; parish began sharing a priest with St. Matthew in 1989; merged with Blessed Trinity as part of diocesan consolidation program for inner-city parishes. Now home of Ephesus Ministries, a nondenominational African-American church. Former rectory notable as site of murder of then-pastor Rev. Joseph Bissonnette, one of two Buffalo priests slain over a two-week period in 1987, as well as that of Sister Karen Klimczak in 2006, ironically after its conversion to a halfway house for former prisoners named in honor of Bissonnette.
St. Benedict the Moor	No image available	281 E. Utica St.	1874 (as St. Nicholas)	1893	Fred Mohr	1993	Parish founded under the name St. Nicholas in Cold Spring, then a well-to-do East Side German neighborhood without a Catholic parish of its own; growing Irish ethnic minority led to bilingual services by 1891. Worshiped in three church buildings each consecutively bigger to accommodate population growth, the final of which was a Gothic-style building with asymmetrical spires 80 and 120 feet in height respectively; towers featured exquisite pointed-arched fenestration in various arrangements. Parish became majority-black in the 1970s and was renamed in 1981 to honor prominent saint of African descent. Merged upon its closure with the neighboring parishes of Our Lady of Lourdes, St. Boniface, and St. Matthew under the new name of St. Martin de Porres. Church building demolished c. late 1990s; site now occupied by various detached single-family homes built in 2000.
St. Bernard		1990 Clinton St.	1907	1954	Mortimer J. Murphy	2025	The newer of the two parishes established in the Kaisertown neighborhood, which began as a tight-knit Polish community centered around St. Casimir church but quickly became German-majority (hence the name); St. Bernard was founded to serve the latter ethnicity. Church is Gothic Revival in style and built of Ohio sandstone accented with Indiana limestone. Diocese's 2011 announcement that both St. Bernard and St. Casimir would dissolve and the congregations would fold into Our Lady of Czestochowa in Cheektowaga was partially reversed upon appeal, whereupon Bishop Kmiec decreed that St. Bernard could stay open on an interim basis pending payoff of the parish's debts and would absorb St. Casimir's congregation. However, in 2015, due to a shortage of priests, parish was "linked" with Our Lady of Czestochowa; both remain independent entities but share the same pastor.
St. Boniface		151 Mulberry St.	1849 (as St. John the Baptist)	1857	unknown	1993	The third German-American Catholic church in Buffalo, serving the Fruit Belt neighborhood northeast of downtown. The church was founded under the name St. John the Baptist and given the new name St. Boniface in 1857 upon the completion of its second church building, an English Romanesque-style structure whose sanctuary was centered on an altar presented to the congregation by King Ludwig II of Bavaria featuring a large oil painting of Saint Boniface. The church also purchased a rare Aeolian organ in 1939 for use in services. The parish population had already begun declining by 1914, and by 1970 had shrunk to fewer than 100 families, leading to the demolition of the church building in 1979. The congregation continued holding Mass in the former Parish House on Locust Street until its merger with Our Lady of Lourdes, St. Benedict the Moor, and St. Matthew to form the new parish of St. Martin de Porres. The site of the original church is now a vacant lot, while the Parish House has been owned since 1995 by Teen Challenge, a faith-based drug recovery organization.
St. Brigid		399 Louisiana St.	1850	1860	Rev. Martin O'Connor	1987	The first Catholic parish to be erected in the city's First Ward, a crowded area of working-class Irish industrial laborers, St. Brigid served as social center for the neighborhood and had an influential voice in community affairs, especially in labor disputes such as the one between industrial magnate William "Fingy" Conners and the city grain scoopers' union in 1899. Parish gained a sizable African-American and Hispanic contingent after the construction of the Commodore Perry housing projects in 1940. Church was badly damaged in a 1968 fire and razed the following year; Mass was held in a chapel in the school building until the parish's 1987 merger with St. Columba. The St. Bridgid's Square (sic) shopping plaza now occupies the site of the former church.
St. Clare		197 Elk St.	2007	1888 (as home of predecessor parish St. Stephen)	Fred W. Humble	2016	Parish merged with St. Teresa's upon its closure. St. Clare itself was the product of a 2007 merger between the parishes of SS. Rita and Patrick, St. Valentine, Holy Apostles SS. Peter & Paul, Precious Blood, and St. Stephen, worshipping in the church formerly belonging to the latter. Building was sold in 2017 to a local sound engineer who plans to turn it into a recording studio and was listed on the National Register of Historic Places in 2018.
St. Columba		75 Hickory St.	1888	1892	unknown	1987	Parish founded in what was then a majority-Irish district on the Near East Side without a conveniently located Catholic church. Held services at first in a converted tenement house before completion of permanent church, a relatively austerely decorated Romanesque-style building whose interior was centered on a marble altar topped with a Celtic cross. Over the years, the ethnic makeup of the congregation changed to Italian and then became largely Hispanic after 1960, when St. Lucy's parish was dissolved and its congregation merged into St. Columba's. Long famous as home of the "Printers' Mass", which took place at 1:30AM on Sunday mornings from 1925 until 1971 for the benefit of late-shift newspaper workers. Parish merged with St. Brigid's, and the combined SS. Columba-Brigid continued to meet in the former's church until it was demolished after a 2004 fire.
St. Elizabeth		986 Grant St.	1906	1908	Max Beierl	2007	Parish served Buffalo's Hungarian-American community, the bulk of whom lived in Black Rock in vicinity of church; however, parish counted members citywide as well as in Lackawanna and Tonawanda due to the fact that it was the only Catholic church in Western New York where Mass was said in the Hungarian language. Church was built of brick and is Romanesque Revival in style, with steel-truss roof and open floor plan. Was still offering Hungarian-language services at time of its merger with Assumption parish as part of 2000s-'10s diocesan consolidation program. Now home of Abundant Life in Christ Ministries, a Pentecostal church with a predominantly African-American congregation.
St. Florian		567 Hertel Ave.	1917	1964	Joseph Fronczak	2007	Smaller of the two Catholic parishes that served the Polish enclave in the Black Rock neighborhood, the northeastern portion of which began to develop around World War I-related industries. Original combination church/school building erected 1919 was meant to be temporary, but unexpectedly slow growth in parish population kept it in use much longer than anticipated. Permanent church building Modernist in style; contained stained glass windows in sanctuary depicting Polish saints which were removed upon the parish's dissolution due to the diocese's "Journey in Faith and Grace" consolidation program. Now home to the nondenominational Renovation Church.
St. Francis de Sales		575 Humboldt Pkwy.	1912	1927	Murphy & Olmsted with George Dietel	1993	Foundation of parish coincided with sale of defunct Buffalo Driving Park site to real estate developers; diocese correctly predicted rapid growth of new East Side neighborhood of Hamlin Park. Current building was third to house parish, replacing a brick combination church/school building built in 1913 and a small temporary church built in 1912, respectively. Most notable for its architecture; an Italian Romanesque design suggestive of churches in Ravenna, with Indiana limestone façade, ceramic tile roof, and 140-foot campanile overlooking Humboldt Parkway; interior bedecked in colorful mosaics executed in Guastavino tile. Building has passed through various owners after closure due to reorganization of inner-city parishes; much of original stained glass was stripped in 2004 by subsequent owner in violation of local preservation law, leading to criticism of city government for lax enforcement. Building was named a Buffalo city landmark in 1978 and is a contributing property to the locally- and National Register of Historic Places-listed Hamlin Park Historic District.
St. Francis of Assisi		133 N. Ogden St.	1908	1960	Albert A. Rumschick	2007	Founded to serve the Italian-American residents of the multiethnic neighborhood of Lovejoy, who arrived slightly later than the Germans and Irish who attended St. Agnes and Visitation, respectively, but who came to demographic dominance after the Second World War. In 2007, as part of the "Journey in Faith and Grace" program, the Buffalo diocese merged Lovejoy's three Catholic parishes into one, which was given the new name St. Katharine Drexel and which continues to meet in the former St. Francis church complex.
St. Francis Xavier		157 East St.	1859	1913	Max Beierl	2007	The "Mother Church of Black Rock", founded several years before the village's annexation by the City of Buffalo to serve a largely German community for whom the nearest Catholic churches were miles away. Congregation grew rapidly throughout 19th century; cemetery established 1864 still extant, now enclosed by Riverside Park. Current building is Lombard Romanesque style with basilica floor plan; sports triple-arched entrance with Tuscan columns and carvings of the signs of the Four Evangelists, prominent raking corbel table under front gable; tower rebuilt 1931 after structural deficiency discovered. Interior features mural paintings in sanctuary and side altars by Father Raphael Pfisterer, stained glass windows by F. X. Zettler Studios are representations of Stations of the Cross (only ones in Buffalo done in art glass), organ is one of last ever built by Herman Schlicker. School merged with that of neighboring St. John the Baptist parish in 1968, closed 1983; began sharing pastor with St. John the Baptist in 1995; parish dissolved as part of "Journey in Faith and Grace" downsizing program. Building listed on National Register of Historic Places in 2009 and is part of the also NRHP-listed Market Square Historic District. Now operated as Buffalo Religious Arts Museum.
St. Gerard		1190 E. Delavan Ave.	1902	1913; enlarged and tower added 1930	Schmill & Gould	2008	Parish was originally German in makeup; initial church was replaced by present building for which ground was broken in 1911; building left only partially completed until 1930, when temporary roof was replaced by permanent one and bell tower was added. Church is Italian Romanesque in style with a design based on the Basilica of Saint Paul Outside the Walls; built of Indiana limestone with niche statues of Saints Gerard and Joseph carved by local sculptor Angelo Gatti; interior decorated with 15 murals depicting the Mysteries of the Rosary, monumental Ionic arcade along sides of nave, fresco painting of the Coronation of Mary inside semidome of apse. After dissolution of parish, building purchased by Catholic congregation in Norcross, Georgia whose proposal to dismantle it piece by piece and ship it there for reassembly sparked contentious debate within the local preservation community especially after Preservation Buffalo Niagara came out in favor of the plan; stained glass windows, altar and pews were removed, but plan was ultimately scuttled due to lack of funds. Building was resold to a Muslim group in 2017 and is currently undergoing conversion to a mosque.
St. James		3021 Bailey Ave.	1916	between 1935 and 1951	unknown	2007	Parish founded to serve mixed German/Irish community in an East Side area that was still semirural at the time but rapidly urbanizing. Ground was broken for the current building in 1926, but construction soon stalled due to lack of funding; congregation worshipped in the basement (the only completed portion of the building) until completion of present church, an unusual-looking Gothic Revival-style building with an enormous, deeply recessed portal dominating the front façade. Interior of church was renovated 1980 but parish population began to decline soon after; shared a pastor with St. Gerard parish for last two years of its existence. After closure of church, building served for a time as a food pantry; now home to a Baptist church serving the local Karen refugee community.
St. Joachim		64 Titus Ave.	1902	1954	Joseph Fronczak	1993	Founded in 1902 to serve a neighborhood that at the time was a small island of German-Americans amidst the vast Polish district of Buffalo's East Side, the congregation's original church on the same site burned in 1942 and, after a period spent worshiping in a temporary chapel in the basement of the parochial school, was replaced by the building seen here. After the parish's dissolution, it served as home of the Free Spirit Missionary Baptist Church until 2014. Now home to Baitul Mamoor Jam-e-Masjid, serving a Muslim congregation of mainly Bangladeshi origin.
St. John Kanty		101 Swinburne St.	1890	1893	unknown	2025	Founded in response to the eastward expansion of Buffalo's East Side Polish-American district; those parishioners who lived in outlying areas had to navigate an at-grade crossing of the busiest railroad line in Buffalo on their way to Mass at St. Stanislaus or St. Adalbert's Basilica, which caused many deaths in the years before the church was founded. Congregation still worships in their original building which was once the social center of the Broadway-Bailey neighborhood; the enormous complex included not only space for worship but also a school, bowling alleys, a gymnasium, and a concert hall where big bands played regularly. It survived fires in 1948 and 1955, the latter a devastating three-alarm blaze that nearly destroyed the building but spared the centerpiece of the church's interior, a life-size carving of the Last Supper that was originally intended for the Basilica of Notre-Dame in Montreal. Interior was completely reconstructed following the 1955 fire and is now Modernist in appearance, in stark contrast to the Gothic Revival exterior.
St. John the Baptist		60 Hertel Ave.	1867	1927	Oakley & Schallmo	2007	Second Catholic parish in Black Rock, founded to serve the Anglophone Irish community that heretofore had worshiped at the German-majority St. Francis Xavier; congregation grew rapidly throughout the 19th century despite 1885 foundation of Annunciation parish to which more than half of St. John the Baptist's former parish was divided out; complex continually expanded to accommodate growth and included a rectory, school, lyceum, and convent by 1914. Church sports a mix of Italian Gothic and Spanish Baroque Revival influences typical of the output of its architects, with exquisite terra cotta detailing both inside and out. Building was named a Buffalo city landmark in 1978. Parish merged with Annunciation as part of diocesan consolidation program; building's purchase two years later by Rev. Ronald Kirk as home of Witness Cathedral of Faith was controversial as congregation had recently been evicted from their previous home, the former Sacred Heart Catholic Church, as neglect of structural maintenance had led to the building being unsafe for occupancy. Church is now vacant; former school is home to RiverRock Church, a congregation affiliated with the Buffalo Myanmar Indigenous Christian Fellowship.
St. John the Evangelist		2319 Seneca St.	1907	1931	Karl Schmill & Sons	2009	Founded by German-speaking faction at St. Teresa who petitioned bishop for establishment of new parish where services would be conducted in their language; however, rapid population growth in parish (and South Buffalo in general) in ensuing years meant congregation had Anglophone majority by 1914. Church property surrounded by verdant Cazenovia Park; present building of Ohio sandstone hearkens back to 14th-century Italian Romanesque style, lacking towers, spires or much exterior ornamentation. Interior contains exquisite mural paintings in apse depicting scenes from Book of Revelation, the work of artist Valdemar Kjeldgaard, as well as stained glass by Rambusch Decorating Company. Building purchased in 2014 by local real estate investor intending to convert it to an event space, but was resold in 2016 to another development group for conversion to apartments and commercial space, possibly including a craft brewery.
St. Joseph New Cathedral		1015 Delaware Ave.	1847 (as St. Joseph Cathedral)	1915	Aristide Leonori	1976	Intended as the new cathedral church of the Buffalo diocese, to replace the old one on Franklin Street downtown. The architect was a native of Rome unaccustomed to the considerations of design for cold climates like Buffalo's, and structural problems made themselves apparent almost immediately: the twin steeples were removed for safety reasons in 1927, and by the 1970s large sections of pews had to be roped off to protect congregants from the chunks of plaster that fell from the ceiling at regular intervals. Unwilling to pay the estimated cost of $2.2 million necessary to restore the building to a sound state, the diocese had it demolished, at which time the original St. Joseph's Cathedral reverted to its former role. Timon Towers, a senior citizens' apartment complex, occupies the site today.
St. Lawrence		1520 E. Delavan Ave.	1929	1961	Thomas Justin Imbs	2024	Traces its history to 1914, when St. Gerard church established a mission to better serve residents of the outer part of its parish territory, namely the Italian settlement on the Far East Side near the city line. Became a parish in its own right in 1929; original church was a small wood-frame building designed by architect Karl Schmill which was expanded in 1930 and again in 1941 before succumbing to fire in 1960. The current church is Modernist in style. St. Lawrence closed on August 10, 2024.
St. Lucy	No image available	264 Swan St.	1906	shortly after 1914	unknown	1960	Served a working-class Campanese Italian community on the Near East Side who had heretofore been attending St. Columba church on account of the distance to St. Anthony of Padua, Buffalo's only established Italian parish at the time; a former Presbyterian church that had been purchased for their use, along with two adjacent houses that served respectively as a rectory and a parochial school staffed by Sisters of St. Mary of Namur from Lockport, were replaced some time after 1914 by a larger building, magnificent and of Victorian style. The church, along with most of the 160-acre tract on which it stood, was demolished shortly after the parish's dissolution due to urban renewal of what was by then a blighted neighborhood. Most of its former congregants moved to other parts of the city; those who didn't joined St. Columba parish. The former site of the church remained vacant until 1991, when a tract of suburban-style housing was built there.
St. Luke		1300 Sycamore St.	1908	1930	Oakley & Schallmo	1993	Founded to serve the Polish population in the northeast corner of the Broadway-Fillmore neighborhood, relatively far removed from other Polish Catholic churches at the time. Rapid growth of neighborhood in first quarter of the 20th century led to repeated cycle of construction of larger buildings to accommodate the congregation: original 1908 frame church was replaced the following year by a combination church/school, which in return was replaced by the current church. Architecture is Italian Romanesque in keeping with the firm's usual style; design based loosely on Old St. Peter's Basilica; most prominently features a glazed polychrome terra cotta frieze over the entrance depicting Biblical figures from the New and Old Testaments. Interior contains four large fresco murals painted in the 1950s by Jan Henryk de Rosen and restored in 2006. Parish purchased after its dissolution by local restaurateur with help from anonymous benefactor and now houses St. Luke's Mission of Mercy, a charitable organization providing food for impoverished neighborhood residents inter alia.
St. Mary Magdalene		1327 Fillmore Ave.	1899	1907	George A. Setter	1978	Parish founded to serve the well-to-do Germans of the East Side neighborhood of Humboldt Park, which was then without a conveniently located Catholic church; three-story combination church/school building built 1900 on land formerly belonging to wealthy miller and landowner George Urban razed in 1906 to make way for present building. Church is built of terra cotta brick and is Romanesque in style; Moorish Revival cupolas that once topped its twin towers were replaced by current ones in simpler style after a 1964 windstorm. Interior once contained mural paintings by Rochester, New York-based artist Albert Prentiss Ward imitating the style of Diego Velázquez, no longer extant. Now home of Antioch Baptist Church.
St. Mary of Sorrows		938 Genesee St.	1872	1901; tower added 1905	Adolphus Druiding	2007	Also known as the Church of the Seven Dolors. Founded in connection with St. Mary Redemptorist's parish cemetery once located nearby on Dodge Street, as well as due to the lack of any other Catholic church in the newly urbanizing area of Humboldt Park. Construction of current (second) church took 15 years; its Rhenish Romanesque design is exemplified by multitudinous rounded towers and was inspired by that of Worms Cathedral; said to be the finest example of the style in Buffalo. Façade is rusticated and of Buffalo Plains limestone. Was one of the largest German Catholic parishes in the city by 1914, with a parish population of about 5,000 and a pastor active in countering socialist political sympathies then popular among East Side German community. Current interior dates to $500,000 restoration after 1947 fire, which spared only the walls and the stained glass windows. Parish population began declining in the 1950s and '60s; in 1985, the diocese announced intentions to demolish the church due to high cost of maintenance, which was prevented by its nomination as a Buffalo city landmark in 1986; it's now home to a community center and was also used for a time as a charter school. Services were held in chapel in former rectory after sale of original church; parish population continued declining and began to share ministry team and resources with St. Ann and SS. Columba-Brigid in 1992 as part of reorganization of "central city" parishes before merging with the latter as part of "Journey in Faith and Grace" program.
St. Mary Redemptorist		225 Broadway	1843	1844	unknown	1981	Founded by the German faction of the discord-plagued Lamb of God parish, parish served for many years as the headquarters for the local chapter of the Congregation of the Most Holy Redeemer, whose territory stretched east to Elmira and north to Toronto and whose itinerant priests held Masses for Catholics in rural communities too small to support their own churches. The St. Mary's complex, comprising the church, an adjacent convent, and St. Mary's Lyceum, was named a Buffalo city landmark in 1980, however the church was destroyed by fire in December 1986, and the convent was demolished in 1990. The site of the church and the adjacent convent are occupied today by private homes; St. Mary's Lyceum is still extant and is used as storage space by the Belmont Management Company.
St. Matthew		1066 E. Ferry St.	1908	1928	George A. Setter	1993	Parish was founded from portions of the territory of St. Mary Magdalene, St. Mary of Sorrows, St. Vincent de Paul, and St. Gerard and served an East Side German congregation. Construction of permanent church began in 1910 but stalled soon afterward due to lack of funds; congregation worshipped in basement of current building, covered by a temporary roof, until work recommenced in 1927. Church is Baroque in style, built of Ohio sandstone and with a design reminiscent of Aachen Cathedral. Parish began sharing a priest with St. Bartholomew in 1989 and merged four years later with the neighboring parishes of Our Lady of Lourdes, St. Boniface, and St. Benedict the Moor under the new name of St. Martin de Porres. Building has passed through the hands of several religious congregations and other owners since parish's dissolution but is currently vacant.
St. Monica		206 Orlando St.	1912	1914	Lansing, Bley & Lyman	1995	Parish met for its first two years in a rented storefront before completion of its permanent building in the Seneca-Babcock neighborhood, an austere and utilitarian one that housed both church and school. Congregation was mixed Irish, Polish and German; parish boundaries were drawn to reflect geographic convenience rather than to encompass a particular ethnic enclave, an unusual phenomenon in Buffalo at the time. Never particularly large in size, the parish was dissolved due to demographic changes in the neighborhood and the retirement of its leader, Msgr. William A. Setlock; the flock was given the choice to join the parishes of St. Stephen, St. Teresa, or SS. Rita & Patrick and voted for the latter. The former St. Monica church building was demolished in 1999 and is now a vacant lot.
St. Patrick		39 Emslie St.	1853 (as St. Vincent de Paul)	1891	Cyrus K. Porter & Son	1981	Founded for the community of working-class Irish industrial laborers that had gathered in the neighborhood known as The Hydraulics. Originally named St. Vincent de Paul in honor of the Vincentian Fathers, a Catholic society to which then-Bishop John Timon belonged; took on the name St. Patrick in 1858 upon the dissolution of the original parish by that name. Had a majority-black congregation in its last years and was the home parish of Ronald Walker, the first African-American Catholic deacon in Buffalo, ordained in 1980. The interior contained a series of 14 paintings depicting the life of Saint Francis of Assisi, the work of artist Marco Silvestri, and was built of Medina sandstone in the Gothic style. Parish was merged with St. Rita's in 1981 due to shrinking congregation and church building was demolished the following year. The friary next door remained in operation until 2018, when the diocese sold it.
St. Patrick (Old)		41 Broadway	1837	1841	unknown	1858	Buffalo's second Catholic parish chronologically, Irish-American in ethnic makeup; seceded from Lamb of God due to their desire to conduct church business in English rather than German. Rev. William Whelan was a temperance advocate and preached strongly against the then-common practice of railroad contractors and other industrial workers being paid partially in whiskey. Served as procathedral for the Buffalo Diocese from its inception in 1847 until services began to be held at St. Joseph's Cathedral, whereupon the parish was dissolved and the building was donated to the Sisters of Charity and became home of St. Vincent's Female Orphan Asylum. The Buffalo Central Library occupies the site today.
St. Rita		190 Fillmore Ave.	1919	1920	George Dietel	1981	Founded in 1919 to serve Buffalo's Slovak-American Catholic community, who had previously worshipped with other immigrants from the Austro-Hungarian Empire at the far-flung St. Elizabeth's parish in Black Rock. Parish merged in 1981 with St. Patrick's on Seymour Street; the merged parish continued using St. Rita's building.
SS. Rita & Patrick		190 Fillmore Ave.	1981	1920 (as home of predecessor parish St. Rita)	George Dietel	2007	Short-lived parish was the result of a 1981 merger between St. Rita and St. Patrick; the congregation of St. Monica was added to the fold after the 1995 dissolution of their parish. The diocese's "Journey in Faith and Grace" consolidation program saw SS. Rita & Patrick merge with St. Valentine, Holy Apostles SS. Peter & Paul, Precious Blood, and St. Stephen parishes to form St. Clare. Church building is of a simple Gothic Revival design, with stained glass by local glazier Jozef Mazur and an interior sanctuary decorated with stencil art, the work of Slovak artisans. The central tower is flat-roofed and steepleless and topped with a cross bottony. Building is now home to Try Jesus Ministries, a nondenominational African-American congregation.
St. Stephen		197 Elk St.	1875	1888	Fred W. Humble	2007	The second Catholic parish to be established in the First Ward, St. Stephen was sited in the eastern part of the neighborhood for the convenience of those who heretofore had to walk long distances to get to St. Brigid. The current Gothic Revival-style building, erected in 1888, had an open-plan interior without pillars and once contained an organ built by the Garrett House Organ Company of Buffalo. Its steeples were removed c. 1932 due to concerns about their structural integrity. As part of the diocese's "Journey in Faith and Grace" consolidation program, St. Stephen's parish merged with those of SS. Rita and Patrick, St. Valentine, Holy Apostles SS. Peter & Paul, and Precious Blood, taking the name St. Clare and continuing to use the building for worship until 2016, when St. Clare itself merged with St. Teresa. Building was sold in 2017 to a local sound engineer who plans to turn it into a recording studio and was listed on the National Register of Historic Places in 2018.
St. Thomas Aquinas		450 Abbott Rd.	1920	1949	Stickle, Kelly & Stickle	2024	Parish founded concurrently with South Buffalo's growth as a streetcar suburb, with an Irish-American congregation originally. Most notable for its architecture: church's Umbrian Romanesque design was inspired by that of Santa Maria in Cosmedin, with a façade of pink, orange and white Tennessee quartzite, a red tile roof, and arcaded cloisters connecting it to the campanile and rectory; those buildings as well as former school surround a courtyard with an outdoor altar and a statue of Saint Thomas Aquinas sculpted by artist Julia Porcelli. Interior contains large mosaic mural of Saints Thomas Aquinas and Bonaventure. Listed on the National Register of Historic Places in 2017. In 2008, as part of the "Journey in Faith and Grace" restructuring program, the diocese "linked" St. Thomas Aquinas with St. Martin of Tours; they remain independent parishes but now share a pastor. Closed as part of the
St. Valentine		528 South Park Ave.	1920	1923	George Dietel	2007	Served a small Polish-American community that had settled in the heretofore monolithically Irish neighborhood of the First Ward. Merged with four other churches as part of the Buffalo diocese's "Journey in Faith and Grace" consolidation program to form the new St. Clare parish. The building was purchased in 2009 by Ellicott Development, who is marketing it for reuse as office or educational space.
St. Vincent de Paul		2033 Main St.	1864	1926	Thomas, Perry & McMullen	1993	Parish founded to serve an East Side neighborhood relatively far removed from downtown, at the time populated sparsely and largely by Germans who worked in the nearby limestone quarries. Growth was initially slow but accelerated beginning in the 1880s; congregation was majority English-speaking by 1914. Present building is in a combination of the Romanesque and Byzantine styles; interior walls are faced in a combination of buff brick and salt-glazed Guastavino tile; sanctuary features mural paintings and mosaics by artist Felix Lieftuchter. Decline in parish population came with demographic changes on the Near East Side after World War II; congregation initially resisted but ultimately assented to the diocese's proposal for a merger with the neighboring parish of Blessed Trinity. The building was purchased by Canisius College upon the parish's dissolution and is now used by them as the Montante Cultural Center, an event space.
Transfiguration		929 Sycamore St.	1893	1897	Karl Schmill	1993	Parish cleaved off the territory of St. Adalbert; served Austrian Polish community that had settled in the northern part of Broadway-Fillmore district. Rapid growth of parish necessitated construction of permanent church almost immediately after parish's founding; Gothic Revival design includes stained glass windows crowned with medallions in pinwheel mullion pattern, only example of such in Buffalo; interior contained a number of mural paintings by Marion Rzeznik and Jozef Mazur including one depicting the legendary Marian apparition over the Vistula during the 1920 Battle of Warsaw. Demographic changes in neighborhood during late 20th century led to closure of school in 1985 and church building in 1990; congregation, by then down to 50 members, met for Mass in chapel of former school building for last three years of parish's existence. Planned demolition of church was forestalled by its nomination as a Buffalo city landmark and its sale to a local not-for-profit who planned to establish a Montessori preschool in the building, though regulatory hurdles led to long delays in structural restoration work and ultimately an arrest warrant for the new owner due to building code violations that was only rescinded after roof repairs began in 2007. Building was resold to a new owner in 2017 but remains vacant.
Visitation of the Blessed Virgin		198 Greene St.	1898	1899	Albert A. Post	2007	Second Catholic parish in the Lovejoy neighborhood, which was predominantly a German enclave but also had a sizable Irish minority who felt uncomfortable worshiping at the already established congregation of St. Agnes. Building housed both church and school and was originally four stories in height including the basement; upper-story auditorium space was removed in 1937 due to structural decay from deferred building maintenance. Parish merged with St. Agnes and St. Francis of Assisi to form the new St. Katharine Drexel parish, which meets in the latter's former home on North Ogden Street. The International Sangha Bhiksu Buddhist Association purchased the building in 2009 intending to use it a convent, but sold it in 2017 without ever having occupied it. Currently slated to be the future home of Madinah Masjid, Lovejoy's first mosque.

== Outside Buffalo ==
=== Current churches ===
This list includes all churches that are open for either regular or occasional Catholic worship, whether they are independent parishes or not.

Name	Image	Location	Founded	Vicariate	Description/Notes
St. Teresa of Avila		Akron	1869	Northern Erie	Catholicism in Akron had its origins in 1853, when priests would travel to Akron to say mass. In 1865, the first church building was erected and by 1869, St. Teresa became a full parish. One year later, a new church building was erected, which served the parish until 1961 when the third and current building was dedicated.
Holy Family formerly St. Joseph		Albion	1852	Niagara Orleans	Founded as St. Joseph in 1852. In 2009, as part of the Journey in Faith and Grace, St. Joseph merged with St. Mary, also in Albion, to form Holy Family Parish, utilizing only the St. Joseph site.
St. John the Baptist		Alden	1850	Southern Erie	One of the many parishes in the Diocese of Buffalo with roots in the missionary activity of Fr. John Neumann, land was purchased in 1850 to build a church in Alden. In 1854, the first resident pastor, Fr. Nicodemus Neumann, arrived and the parish was formally founded. In 1894, the present church was constructed.
St. Jude; Immaculate Conception Parish	Alfred Newman Club, Catholic church in Alfred, New York	Alfred	1959	Southern Tier East	St. Jude was established in 1959 as a chapel for the campus communities of Alfred University and Alfred State College. In 1992, it was merged with St. Brendan in Almond to form SS Brendan & Jude Parish. In 2025, as part of the Road to Renewal, SS Brendan & Jude was merged into Immaculate Conception Parish in Wellsville, with St. Jude retained as a worship site.
St. Bonaventure		Allegany	1854	Southern Erie	Staffed by Franciscans and closely associated with the nearby St. Bonaventure University, St. Bonaventure parish was established in 1854. In 2011, St. John the Baptist Church in Vandalia was merged into St. Bonaventure.
St. Gregory the Great		Amherst	1958	Northern Erie	St. Gregory the Great traces its history back to August 22, 1957, when the Buffalo Diocese completed the purchase of a 23-acre farmstead for use as the site of a new church to serve the Catholic population of what was now a rapidly suburbanizing section of Amherst. In November 1958, when the parish was only a few months old, plans were unveiled for the enormous campus that included not only a church but also a rectory, a convent, and a large school building with 11 classrooms, a gymnasium and auditorium, cafeteria, and outdoor recreational facilities. The church building was dedicated in October 1968, and new construction has proceeded apace since: most recently, the year 2000 saw the dedication of the aforementioned bell tower, a new rectory and ministry center comprising a vast performance space, meeting rooms, a commercial kitchen and food pantry, and a Catholic-supply store.
St. Leo the Great		Amherst	1954	Northern Erie	St. Leo traces its history as a parish back to 1953, when the Diocese of Buffalo purchased 20 acres of farmland in what was then a rapidly suburbanizing section of West Amherst on which to eventually build a church and school, as well as a small house on a neighboring lot to serve as a temporary rectory for founding pastor Fr Cletus Snyder. The parochial school opened in September 1954 after a few months of construction, complete with a chapel in the basement where Sunday Mass would be held for the following fourteen years. The ensuing years saw the completion of an expansion of the school (1958), the permanent rectory (1966), and finally the church itself (1971).
Most Precious Blood		Angola	1871	Southern Erie	Prior to the foundation of Most Precious Blood in 1871, the spiritual needs of Catholics in Angola were met by religious order priests from Dunkirk. A disused schoolhouse was purchased and served as the first church building for the fledgling community. In 1897, the first purpose built church was erected for the parish. This was followed by a modern church in 1962. In 2025, as part of the Road to Renewal, St. Anthony Church in Farnham was merged into Most Precious Blood, and closed.
St. Mary formerly SS Peter & Paul		Arcade	1907	Southern Tier East	In 2007, as part of the Journey in Faith and Grace, SS Peter & Paul was merged with St. Mary in East Arcade and Blessed Sacrament in Delevan to form St. Mary Parish. Worship sites were maintained in Arcade and East Arcade. In 2025, as part of the Road to Renewal, several parishes were merged into St. Mary. St. Aloysius Church in Springville and St. Joseph Church in Holland were merged and slated to remain open, St. Jude Church in Sardinia and St. John the Baptist Church in West Valley were merged and closed, and the St. Mary site in East Arcade was slated to close. However, the decision to close St. Mary in East Arcade was appealed to the Vatican, and the church remains open during the appeals process.
St. Francis of Assisi; St. Mary of the Lake Parish		Athol Springs	1929	Southern Erie	In 1929, as St. Francis High School was being launched by the Conventual Franciscans, that order wished to establish a parish adjacent to their school. Bishop Turner created St. Francis of Assisi Parish, and entrusted it to the care of the Franciscans. The first pastor was Fr. Thomas Wieprecht. A school was established in 1947 and operated until 1999. A new church was built in 1958. In 2025, as part of the Road to Renewal, St. Francis was merged into St. Mary of the Lake Parish. It continues to operate as a secondary worship site of St. Mary, offering daily and weekend masses.
St. Vincent de Paul; St. John Neumann Parish		Attica	1851	Geneseee Wyoming	St. Vincent de Paul was founded in 1851. In 1882, the present 380-seat church was built. In 2008, as part of the Journey in Faith and Grace, St. Vincent de Paul merged with St. Joseph in Varysburg to form SS Joachim & Anne Parish, utilizing both sites for worship. In 2025, as part of the Road to Renewal, SS Joachim and Anne was merged into St. John Neumann Parish, with both sites remaining in continuous use.
St. Patrick; Our Lady of the Lake Parish		Barker	1865	Niagara Orleans	In 2009, as part of the Journey in Faith and Grace, St. Patrick merged with St. Joseph in Lyndonville to form Our Lady of the Lake. St. Joseph was destroyed in 2023 leaving St. Patrick as the only surviving church of Our Lady of the Lake.
Ascension formerly Sacred Heart		Batavia	1871	Geneseee Wyoming	Sacred Heart was founded in 1903 to cater to the Polish-American community in Batavia. At Sacred Heart's original location on Jackson Street, Mass was held in a converted house and a barn was converted for use as a school; this setup actually lasted for half a century, when the low-lying property was finally vacated due to persistent flooding. The church pictured here was erected in 1954, this modest-scaled church building is a work of Buffalo architect Frank Mazurowski, who in his design combines elements of the Colonial Revival and Gothic Revival styles, both in the simplified versions that were common in the mid-20th century: the latter is exemplified by the pointed arched crowning the windows and front entrance, while the former turns up in the roofs, whose gable returns at the base suggest broken pediments. In 2008, as part of the Journey in Faith and Grace, Sacred Heart was merged with St. Anthony Church, also in Batavia, to found Ascension. Both sites were used until 2012, when St. Anthony was closed. As part of the Road to Renewal, Ascension was to be merged into Resurrection Parish in Batavia in 2024 and closed. However, the decision to merge Ascension was appealed to the Vatican, and the church remains open during the appeals process.
St. Joseph; Resurrection Parish		Batavia	1849	Geneseee Wyoming	St. Joseph was founded in 1849 as the first Catholic church in Batavia. In 2008, as part of the Journey in Faith and Grace, St. Joseph merged with St. Mary, also in Batavia, to form Resurrection Parish, utilizing both sites for worship. In 2024, as part of the Road to Renewal, the St. Mary site closed and the parishes of St. Maximilian Kolbe and St. Padre Pio merged into Resurrection with Holy Name of Mary Church from St. Maximilian Kolbe and St. Cecilia Church from St. Padre Pio used as worship sites, with St. Joseph being the main church for the parish.
St. Patrick		Belfast	1859	Southern Tier East	In 2012, St. Mark in Rushford was merged into St. Patrick and served as an oratory until it was closed in 2024. In 2025, as part of the Road to Renewal, St. Mary in Canaserage and St. Patrick in Fillmore was merged into St. Patrick in Belfast, utilizing all three sites for regular worship.
Holy Family of Jesus, Mary and Joseph formerly St. Mary		Belmont	1861	Southern Tier East	St. Mary in Belmont was established in 1861. In 2007, as part of the Journey in Faith and Grace, St. Mary was merged with Sacred Heart in Angelica and St. Joseph in Scio into Holy Family of Jesus, Mary and Joseph Parish. The St. Joseph site was retained as an oratory, and the Sacred Heart site was closed. In 2025, as part of the Road to Renewal, Holy Family was merged into Immaculate Conception Parish in Wellsville.
Our Lady of Lourdes; St. Mary of Lourdes		Bemus Point	1948	Southern Tier West	In 1940, a chapel dedicated to St. Elizabeth was constructed in Bemus Point for the use of summer residents on Chautauqua Lake. In 1948, Our Lady of Lourdes was founded as an independent parish. In 2008, as part of the Journey in Faith and Grace, Our Lady of Lourdes was merged with St. Mary in Mayville to form St. Mary of Lourdes Parish. Both sites are utilized for regular worship.
St. Brigid		Bergen	1871	Geneseee Wyoming	St. Brigid was founded in 1871. Fr. P.J. Malloy served as its first pastor. As part of the Journey in Faith and Grace, St. Michael in South Byron was merged into St. Brigid on January 13, 2008. As part of the Road to Renewal, St. Brigid was to be merged into Our Lady of Mercy in Le Roy in 2025 and closed. However, the decision to merge St. Brigid was appealed to the Vatican, and the church remains open during the appeals process.
St. John the Baptist; SS Peter & Paul Parish		Boston	1869	Southern Erie	In 1869, a congregation for German Catholics was established in Boston. The first church, which served for the next 97 years, was constructed that same year. In 1877, Fr. George Zuercher was sent as the first resident pastor. A school was operated from 1904 to 1973, and a new church was dedicated in 1968. In 2008, as part of the Journey in Faith and Grace, St. Mary Church in East Eden was merged into St. John the Baptist. St. Mary continues as an oratory of St. John the Baptist. In 2025, as part of the Road to Renewal, St. John the Baptist was merged into SS Peter & Paul Parish in Hamburg. Regular weekday and weekend masses continue to be held at St. John the Baptist and St. Mary.
Sacred Heart of Jesus		Bowmansville	1920	Northern Erie	In 1917, a mission was established for Catholics residing in Bowmansville. Three years later, the first church building was erected and Sacred Heart of Jesus parish was inaugurated. After many years of overcrowding, the current church, which seats 450 people, was dedicated in 1959, costing $187,500. Sacred Heart is a designated diocesan shrine, and is home to two outdoor grottoes, both dedicated in the 1920s. The parish school, which operated intermittently from 1920 to 1983, is home to the Chesterton Academy of Buffalo. In 2024, as part of the Road to Renewal, Sacred Heart was slated to merge into Nativity Parish in Harris Hill. As of July 2025, no merger has taken place.
St. Mary; St. Patrick Parish		Canaseraga	1855	Southern Tier East	From 1855 to 1865, the Catholic community in Canaseraga was a mission of St. Mary in Hornell. A formal parish was organized in 1865, and the first (and present) church was built in 1877. In 2025, as part of the Road to Renewal, St. Mary was merged into St. Patrick Parish in Belfast, remaining as a site for regular worship.
Infant of Prague		Cheektowaga	1946	Northern Erie	Infant of Prague was founded in 1946 on the recommendation of Rev. Maurice Woulfe, pastor of the nearby Our Lady Help of Christians whose parish was growing explosively with the postwar flight of city residents to the suburbs. Worshipping originally in an old airplane hangar, a combination church and school building was erected around the corner on Foisset Lane in 1950 and replaced in short order with the current one, for which ground was broken in November 1959. The church was dedicated in 1962. In 2009, as part of the Journey in Faith and Grace, Mother of Divine Grace, also in Cheektowaga, was merged into Infant of Prague. In 2025, as part of the Road to Renewal, Infant of Prague was set to be merged into SS Peter & Paul in Williamsville and its properties disposed of. However, the decision to merge Infant of Prague was appealed to the Vatican, and the church remains open during the appeals process.
Our Lady, Help of Christians		Cheektowaga	1851	Southern Erie	This German parish, founded in 1851, is well known for its Maria Hilf Chapel (pictured here). It was built in 1853, was the site of many miraculous healings, and has been placed on the National Register of Historic Places. The chapel is one of two places where the Latin Mass is celebrated licitly in the Diocese of Buffalo, the other being St. Anthony of Padua Oratory in Buffalo. A newer, more modern church was built in 1959 and is the site of the Novus Ordo congregation.
Our Lady of Czestochowa		Cheektowaga	1922	Buffalo	Our Lady of Czestochowa was founded in 1922 to serve a Polish-American community whose spread eastward had now taken them from the original enclave of Kazimierzowo, on the far East Side of the city, over the border into the Town of Cheektowaga, in the area now known as Doyle. The fledgling parish held Mass in rented spaces above a grocery store and in a converted horse stable until the 1928 construction of their first home (to the right in the image), a combination church and school building designed in a handsome Italian Renaissance style. This structure served their needs for 45 years and remains in use as a school and parish hall. Ground was broken for the current church in January 1972, with a cornerstone-laying ceremony held that December to coincide with the parish's 50th anniversary. It is a Modern-styled building, whose architecture is representative of a contemporaneous mini-trend in local church design that favored low-slung, often roundish buildings whose steel-reinforced exterior walls permitted an open floor plan with sightlines unobstructed by pillars or other intrusions. More specifically, Our Lady of Czestochowa's building sports an octagonal footprint, a buff brick exterior, and an entrance recessed behind a pair of engaged brick pillars and a gable-like canopy, with a large stained glass window set above the doors. Topping off the tent roof is a roughly cone-shaped spire with a cross at its peak. In 2024, as part of the road to renewal, St. Bernard Church, located less than a half a mile west on Clinton Street, was merged into Our Lady of Czestochowa.
Queen of Martyrs; Our Lady, Help of Christians Parish		Cheektowaga	1946	Southern Erie	On June 2, 1946, before any buildings could be built, Fr. John Szal pitched a tent and held mass for 46 people. From there, Queen of Martyrs was born. A combination church/school was dedicated in October of that same year, which served the parish until 1954, when the final church, designed by Backus, Crane & Love, was built. In 2025, as part of the Road to Renewal, Queen of Martyrs was merged into Our Lady Help of Christians Parish in Cheektowaga. It is expected that Queen of Martyrs will close later in 2025.
Resurrection		Cheektowaga	1922	Southern Erie	Resurrection parish was founded in 1944 to serve the growing community of Cheektowaga. Its church building was dedicated in December 1969.
St. Aloysius Gonzaga		Cheektowaga	1940	Northern Erie	One of the first Catholic congregations in Cheektowaga to owe its establishment to the suburbanization process that was incipient at the time of its founding and would grow to tidal-wave proportions over the next decades, it was in 1940 when St. Aloysius Gonzaga's parish boundaries were carved out of those of St. James, St. Benedict, and Christ the King. Founding priest Fr. Walter Gonter said Mass in a temporary frame structure for ten months until the present building, designed by local architect Mortimer Murphy, was dedicated in 1941. The growth of the parish was so rapid - it had doubled in size by 1952, to 1,800 families - that expansions to the building became necessary almost immediately. The parochial school was opened in 1948; new sacristies added in 1952 and '53 allowed for enlargement of the worship space, and finally a convent for the Sisters of Saint Joseph who staffed the school was erected in 1962. The nearby Bishop Neumann High School, too, was founded in 1959 largely to serve the continuing Catholic educational needs of the graduates of St. Aloysius' parochial school. As elsewhere in the Buffalo diocese, parish membership tallies plateaued in 1980 and soon began to drop, in tune with both the changing demographics of the innermost ring of suburbia and the secularization of American society as a whole. The parish school closed in 2007 and in that same year, as part of the Journey in Faith and Grace, Immaculate Heart of Mary Parish in Buffalo was merged into St. Aloysius. In 2025, as part of the Road to Renewal, St. Aloysius Gonzaga was set to be merged into Christ the King Parish in Synder and its properties disposed of. However, the decision to merge St. Aloysius was appealed to the Vatican, and the church remains open during the appeals process.
St. John Gualbert; St. Stanislaus Parish		Cheektowaga	1916	Buffalo	Standing at the corner of Gualbert Avenue and Doat Street just about a quarter of a mile (500 m) from the Buffalo city line, St. John Gualbert Catholic Church was founded in 1916 to serve the Polish-American enclave in the Pine Hill neighborhood of Cheektowaga, New York, dubbed "Gwalbertowo". A combination church/school building was completes that same year. Fr. Peter Adamski served as the first resident pastor, arriving in 1918, and oversaw the construction of the present church, which was dedicated in 1929. In 2007, as part of the Journey in Faith and Grace, Queen of Peace and Holy Name of Jesus parishes were merged into St. John Gualbert, utilizing only the Gualbert site. In 2025, as part of the Road to Renewal, St. John Gualbert was merged into St. Stanislaus Parish in Buffalo, with St. John Gualbert continued to be utilized as a worship site. The church serves as the Diocesan Shrine of the Holy Relics of the Saints, and is home to more than 1,000 relics.
St. Josaphat; Resurrection Parish		Cheektowaga	1906	Southern Erie	St. Josaphat owes its existence to the continued growth and out-migration of Buffalo's Polish-American community, which by the first decade of the 20th century had surpassed the city line to establish homes in what's now the Doyle area of suburban Cheektowaga; Bishop Charles Colton founded the parish in 1905 and appointed Father Andrew Garstka as its first pastor. A combination church/school building, erected in 1907 and rebuilt following a 1924 fire, was soon enough superseded by the present structure, which was completed in 1952. In 2025, as part of the Road to Renewal, St. Josaphat was merged into Resurrection Parish in Cheektowaga. It is expected that St. Josaphat will close later in 2025.
St. Philip the Apostle		Cheektowaga	1850	Southern Erie	One of the last new parishes to be founded in the Buffalo Diocese (excepting those formed as mergers of preexisting parishes during the diocesan downsizing programs of the 1990s and 2000s), St. Philip the Apostle traces its history back to 1967, when Buffalo bishop James McNulty appointed Msgr. Anthony Jasinski to head up a new parish in the fast-developing southern portion of the town of Cheektowaga. The flock worshiped for the first year and a half of its existence on the premises of the Brushenbrook Hunting and Fishing Club before the completion of their first permanent home, a combination church and school building that was dedicated in May 1969 and now serves as the Monsignor Jasinski Parish Center. The dedication of their second and present church building, designed by the Williamsville-based firm of A. M. Mussachio, occurred ten years later. The parish is notable in the local diocese as the holder of a relic of St. Philip himself - namely the skeletal remains of his foot, complete with the crucifixion wound from his martyrdom - which was uncovered by archaeologists in 2017 during structural repairs to his tomb in the crypt of the Basilica of the Twelve Holy Apostles in Rome.
Our Lady of Peace; Nativity of the Blessed Virgin Mary Parish		Clarence	1922	Northern Erie	The second Catholic church to serve Clarence, Our Lady of Peace was cleaved off the parish territory of St. Teresa of Avila in Akron to serve the Catholics of Clarence Hollow. Their original home, built in 1922, is an interesting stylistic hodgepodge, freely borrowing elements of Colonial Revivalism (namely the symmetrical façade and the open bell tower crowning the front gable) and Gothic (the pointed arches that once crowned the windows and front entrance, bricked over today but still retaining their decorative keystone voussoirs). Their original building was superseded in 1965 by a much larger church building, pictured here. The new building is a fine example of the heavily Modernist-influenced Late Gothic Revival style that dominated Catholic church architecture in Western New York in the middle 20th century: pointed arches predominate, but so do sleek lines and geometric forms, even in the tracery that adorns the large stained-glass window above the main entrance. In 2025, as part of the Road to Renewal, Our Lady of Peace was slated to be merged into Nativity Parish in Harris Hill. However, the decision to merge Our Lady of Peace was appealed to the Vatican, and the church remains independent during the appeals process.
Our Lady of the Angels; Immaculate Conception Parish		Cuba	1850	Southern Tier East	The first priest to serve Our Lady of the Angels was Fr. John Doran, who organized the parish in 1850. Churches were built in 1854, 1883, and 1926. In 2004, Sacred Heart Church in Friendship was merged into Our Lady of the Angels. In 2025, as part of the Road to Renewal, Our Lady of the Angels ws merged into Immaculate Conception Parish in Wellsville and retained as a site for regular worship.
St. Martha formerly Our Lady of the Blessed Sacrament		Depew	1965	Southern Erie	In 1965, Our Lady of the Blessed Sacrament (OLBS) was founded. In 2011, OLBS merged with St. Barnabas Church to form St. Martha. In 2025, as part of the Road to Renewal, St. Martha was slated to be merged into St. Mary of the Assumption in Lancaster, and closed. However, the decision to merge St. Martha was appealed to the Vatican, and the church remains open during the appeals process.
Holy Trinity		Dunkirk	1908	Southern Tier West	In 1908, Holy Trinity was established as a personal parish for Italian migrants who moved to the Dunkirk area. Initially located at the corner of Ruggles and Wright Streets, a church was erected in 1909. Due to changing demographics, the church moved to Central Avenue in 1972, midway between Dunkirk and Fredonia. In 2025, as part of the Road to Renewal, the parish was transformed from a personal to a territorial parish, and took on the territory of St. Joseph in Fredonia and St. Elizabeth Ann Seton in Dunkirk, and absorbed the personal parish of Blessed Mary Angela in Dunkirk.
St. Elizabeth Ann Seton; Holy Trinity Parish formerly St. Mary		Dunkirk	1851	Southern Tier West	The first Catholic parish in Chautauqua County, the first church was built in 1851, and the present church, one of the oldest buildings in the Diocese of Buffalo, was built in 1855. From 1860 to 1972, the parish was staffed by the Passionist Fathers. In 1972, St. Mary merged with Sacred Heart Church in Dunkirk to form St. Elizabeth Ann Seton, using the St. Mary site for worship. In 2025, as part of the Road to Renewal, St. Elizabeth was merged into Holy Trinity Parish in Dunkirk. St. Elizabeth continues to be used for regular worship, including Spanish language masses.
St. Hyacinth; Holy Trinity Parish formerly part of Blessed Mary Angela Parish		Dunkirk	1875	Southern Tier West	In 1875, St. Hedwig was established as a personal parish to serve the Polish community in Dunkirk. Another Polish personal parish, St. Hedwig, was established in 1902. A St. Hyacinth parishioner, Lillian Halasinski, attributed a healing in her leg to Mary Angela Truszkowska in 1984. Her healing was certified by the Vatican as a miracle attributed to the intercession of Truszkowska, and was the impetus for her beatification in 1993. In 2008, as part of the Journey in Faith and Grace, St. Hyacinth and St. Hedwig were merged together as Blessed Mary Angela Truszkowska Parish, using both sites for regular worship. In 2025, St. Hedwig was closed and Blessed Mary Angela was suppressed into Holy Trinity Parish in Dunkirk. It is expected that St. Hyacinth will close in 2026.
St. Mary; St. Mary Parish		East Arcade	1846	Southern Tier East	In 1846, a church was built to serve the recent arrivals to East Arcade of victims of the Great Famine of Ireland. A larger church was built in 1892 but, by 1944, it was determined that this church was too large for the parish and its materials were used to construct the current, smaller building. In 2007, as part of the Journey in Faith and Grace, St. Mary was merged with SS Peter & Paul in Arcade and Blessed Sacrament in Delevan to form a new parish, also called St. Mary. In 2025, as part of the Road to Renewal, St. Mary in East Arcade was slated to close. However, the decision to close St. Mary was appealed to the Vatican, and the church remains open during the appeals process.
Immaculate Conception		East Aurora	1882	Geneseee Wyoming	
St. Mary; SS Peter & Paul Parish		East Eden	1835	Southern Erie	Established in 1835, St. Mary is Erie County's first Catholic church outside of Buffalo. In 2008, as part of the Journey in Faith and Grace, St. Mary was merged into St. John the Baptist in Boston, continuing as an oratory of the merged parish. With the Road to Renewal, St. Mary joined St. John the Baptist in a merger into SS Peter & Paul Church in Hamburg, and has been upgraded to a secondary worship site.
Holy Name of Mary; Resurrection Parish		East Pembroke	1868	Geneseee Wyoming	Holy Name of Mary was founded in 1868. As part of the Journey in Faith and Grace, Holy Name of Mary was merged with St. Francis of Assisi in Corfu in 2009 to form St. Maximilian Kolbe Parish. Both sites were utilized for worship. St. Maximilian Kolbe Parish itself was merged into Resurrection Parish in Batavia as part of the Road to Renewal in 2024, with Holy Name of Mary continuing as a worship site of Resurrection.
Immaculate Conception		Eden	1908	Southern Tier West	In 1907, a priest was sent to Eden to establish a parish. The first church was built in 1908. The present church was dedicated in 1958. In 2024, as part of the Road to Renewal, Holy Spirit Church in North Collins was merged into Immaculate Conception.
St. Benedict		Eggertsville	1920	Northern Erie	Owing its existence to the very beginning of the process of suburbanization in the Buffalo metro area, the parish was formed in 1920 to serve the spiritual needs of the rapidly growing hamlet of Eggertsville. The first resident priest was Fr. William Tobin, and the first church building, which served the parish for a decade, was dedicated in 1921. It was followed by a combination church/school building, which still serves the parish school. The current church, designed by architect Mortimer Murphy in the Late Gothic Revival style, was erected in 1952. In 2025, as part of the Road to Renewal, St. Benedict was decreed to be merged into St. Leo the Great Parish in Amherst, where it would survive as a secondary worship site. However, the decision to merge St. Benedict was appealed to the Vatican, and the church remains independent during the appeals process.
Holy Name of Mary		Ellicottville	1850	Southern Tier East	In 2007, as part of the Journey in Faith and Grace, St. Pacificus in Humphrey was merged into Holy Name of Mary. It continues as an oratory of Holy Name of Mary.
Annuncuation		Elma	1882	Geneseee Wyoming	
St. Gabriel of Our Lady of Sorrows		Elma	1925	Southern Erie	
St. Patrick; St. Patrick (Belfast) Parish		Fillmore	1881	Southern Tier East	In 1881, a simple church was constructed to serve Catholics in Fillmore. The first resident pastor, Fr. Albert Rivers, was assigned in 1905. The current church was built in 1914. In 2025, as part of the Road to Renewal, St. Patrick was merged into St. Patrick Parish in Belfast, remaining as a site for regular worship.
St. Philomena		Franklinville	1873	Southern Tier East	St. Philomena got its start as a parish in 1873 and worshiped for many years at a site adjacent to the Free Methodist Church on South Main Street. The move to the present site culminated with the new church's dedication in May 1965. In 2007, as part of the Journey in Faith and Grace, Holy Family in Machias was merged into St. Philomena. In 2025, St. Philomena was slated to be merged into Holy Name of Mary in Ellicottville, remaining as a site for regular worship.
St. Matthias; Christ our Hope Parish		French Creek	1873	Southern Tier West	In 2008, as part of the Journey in Faith and Grace, St. Matthias merged with St. Isaac Jogues in Sherman to form Christ our Hope Parish. St. Isaac Jogues was closed in 2025 leaving St. Matthias as the only surviving church of Christ our Hope.
Fourteen Holy Helpers; Queen of Heaven Parish		Gardenville	1864	Southern Erie	What is now Gardenville once one of the Ebenezer Colonies, settled by the Community of True Inspiration. Once they moved on to Amana, Iowa, their church was purchased by a new Catholic parish, who razed it and built the present church in its place. A school operated until 2014. In 2025, as part of the Road to Renewal, Fourteen Holy Helpers was merged into Queen of Heaven Parish, with regular services continuing at both sites.
St. Pius X		Getzville	1958	Northern Erie	In 1958, noting the suburbanization in the Buffalo area, Bishop James McNulty appointed Fr. Joseph Weber to serve as pastor of the fledgling St. Pius X Parish. Masses were initially held in the Getzville Fire Hall until Christmas, 1959, when a suitable temporary structure, a parish social hall, was ready for use. A permanent church building was completed a decade later. Plans for a parish school never materialized. In 2025, as part of the Road to Renewal, St. Pius X was to be merged into St. Gregory the Great parish.
St. Joseph		Gowanda	1898	Southern Tier West	While Mass was celebrated in Gowanda as far back as 1855, St. Joseph was not founded until 1888, when a church was built. Ten years later, St. Joseph was formalized as an independent parish. A parish school operated from 1925 to 2014. In 1992, St. Elizabeth in Cherry Creek was merged into St. Joseph. In 2008, as part of the Journey in Faith and Grace, St. Paul of the Cross in Dayton, St. Joan of Arc in Perrysburg, and St. John Fisher in South Dayton were merged into St. Joseph. In 2025, as part of the Road to Renewal, St. Mary in Cattaraugus, itself having absorbed St. Isidore in East Otto and St. Mary in Little Valley in 2008, was merged into St. Joseph. Only St. Joseph is used for worship in this geographically expansive parish.
St. Stephen		Grand Island	1862	Northern Erie	
Saint Mary of the Lake		Hamburg	1926	Southern Erie	In 1926, a mission church of Our Lady of Perpetual Help in Lake View was established in the Mount Vernon area of Hamburg. The mission church met for several years in a large farmhouse until 1940, when a purpose built church was constructed. In 1948, St. Mary of the Lake was established as an independent parish. A new church was built in 2000. In 2025, as part of the Road to Renewal, St. Francis of Assisi Church in Athol Springs was merged into St. Mary of the Lake, with both sites utilized for regular worship.
SS Peter & Paul		Hamburg	1844	Southern Erie	One of the earliest Catholic congregations in Western New York, the parish was founded in 1844 by about two dozen German farm families who previously had to travel as far as Buffalo or Eden to attend Mass. They began worshiping in a former Baptist church on this site, with Redemptorist priests from St. Mary's in Buffalo holding services every other week. The church building seen here, their third, was erected in 1911. In 2025, as part of the Road to Renewal, St. John the Baptist Church in Boston and St. Bernadette Church in Orchard Park was to be merged into SS Peter & Paul. However, the decision to merge St. Bernadette was appealed to the Vatican, and the church remains open during the appeals process.
Nativity of the Blessed Virgin Mary		Harris Hill	1954	Northern Erie	Founded in 1954, Nativity is the newest of Clarence's three Catholic parishes, yet the parcel on which it sits had been used for religious purposes for over a century prior: it was the site of the Harris Hill United Brethren Church's parsonage beginning in the 1860s, and before that, of the so-called "Devil's Cave": a 150-foot-long cavern created by water leaching through the Onondaga limestone bedrock which was supposedly used to shelter runaway slaves as part of the Underground Railroad. The parish itself was split from Sacred Heart in Bowmansville and, for its first year, shared a Sacred Heart's church building. Architect Joseph Fronczak brings to bear a staunchly classicist Georgian Revival design that hearkens back to what was more typically seen half a century or more before its 1965 completion: the façade of the building features columns and pilasters of the Ionic order supporting a broken pediment above the triple entrance, with balustrades flanking the base of the tower and round-arched windows decorated with ornamental keystones and voussoirs.
St. Joseph; St. Mary Parish		Holland	1890	Southern Tier East	Beginning in 1865 and continuing for about twenty years later, pastors passing through town from Boston, Spring Brook and elsewhere would say Mass about once a month for the two dozen or so Catholic families in the area; after that, the congregation moved to a proper building in the center of Holland, and services became more frequent: two Masses a month were said by preachers from East Aurora and, later, Arcade. In 1924 - six years after the original mission church burned down in a fire of unknown cause - St. Joseph became a parish in its own right, worshiping in a converted private residence that was razed and superseded by the current building located on the same site. The present church, the work of the Buffalo-based architect Gerard Zimmermann, was built in 1968. In 2025, as part of the Road to Renewal, St. Joseph was merged into St. Mary Parish in Arcade, remaining open for regular daily and weekly masses.
St. Mary		Holley	1866	Niagara Orleans	
St. Pacificus oratory of Holy Name of Mary		Humphrey	1855	Southern Tier East	In 1855, Fr. Pamphilus da Magliano, a Franciscan friar, established St. Pacificus. Thought to be the only church in North America dedicated to Pacificus of San Severino, St. Pacificus was merged into Holy Name of Mary in Ellicottville in 2007, as part of the Journey in Faith and Grace.
St. James		Jamestown	1910	Southern Tier West	St. James was established in 1910, serving a largely Italian community. Masses were said in a large house until 1915, when the first church was built. The present church was built in 1968. In 2008, as part of the Journey in Faith and Grace, Our Lady of Victory Church in Frewsburg was merged into St. James, continuing as a worship site until 2025, when it was closed. In 2025, as part of the Road to Renewal, Our Lady of Loreto Church in Falconer was merged into St. James, and closed. Additionally, Holy Apostles Parish in Jamestown was due to be merged into St. James, but that merger was put on hold due to an appeal to the Vatican.
St. John; Holy Apostles Parish		Jamestown	1927	Southern Tier West	St. John was established in 1927 in an underserved part of Jamestown. Churches were built in 1927, 1935, and 1961. In 2008, as part of the Journey in Faith and Grace, St. John was merged with SS Peter & Paul to form Holy Apostles Parish. In 2025, as part of the Road to Renewal, Holy Apostles was set to be merged into St. James Parish, with St. John continuing as a worship site. However, the decision to close All Saints was appealed to the Vatican, and the parish remains unmerged during the appeals process.
SS Peter & Paul; Holy Apostles Parish		Jamestown	1854	Southern Tier West	The first Catholic church established in southern Chautauqua County, SS Peter & Paul was established as an independent parish in 1863. The present building is the third church to have been located on the same site, replacing, respectively, a small chapel used by visiting priests that stood from 1854 until an 1860 fire, and an earlier wood-frame church that was the first to house the parish proper. Built between 1894 and 1900, the present church was designed by Franz Joseph Untersee. A school operated from 1865 to 2012. In 1971, St. Joseph in Jamestown was merged into SS Peter & Paul. In 2008, as part of the Journey in Faith and Grace, SS Peter & Paul was merged with St. John to form Holy Apostles Parish. In 2025, as part of the Road to Renewal, Holy Apostles was set to be merged into St. James Parish, with SS Peter & Paul to be closed. However, the decision to close All Saints was appealed to the Vatican, and the parish remains open during the appeals process.
St. John the Baptist		Kenmore	1836	Northern Erie	Founded by Fr. John Neumann in 1836, St. John the Baptist made its home first in a log chapel and then in a small stone church built in 1849. The parish existed until 1892, when it was closed. In 1927, the parish was re-opened using the 1849 structure as its church. A larger church and modern school were later built.
St. Paul		Kenmore	1897	Northern Erie	Founded in 1892, St. Paul's was created to serve the residents of the then-newly founded village of Kenmore, which was quickly growing into its planned role as Buffalo's first proper suburb and whose predicted rapid population growth was quickly becoming a reality. The present-day church, built in 1954, replaced a simple wood-frame structure built in 1897 with the volunteer labor of a community of Jesuit priests from St. Michael's on Washington Street in downtown Buffalo. The newer, Mortimer J. Murphy designed building was built in the Late Gothic Revival style that was so favored by its designer, and which was still quite a popular trend in ecclesiastical architecture in the local area at the time the church was built.
Our Lady of Bistrica formerly Our Lady of the Sacred Heart of Jesus		Lackawanna	1917	Southern Erie	This Croatian personal parish was established in 1917 and initially housed at St. Hyacinth Church in Lackawanna. A small frame church was built in March 1917 and a large brick edifice wad dedicated at 108 Ridge Road in 1920. In 1961, the congregation left the Ridge Road site for a new home on Abbott Road. An auditorium was built which doubled as a church until 1976, when a modern church was built. At that time, the parish changed its name from Our Lady of the Sacred Heart of Jesus to Our Lady of Bistrica. In 2024, the church was slated for merger with OLV Basilica, and closure.
Our Lady of Victory Basilica formerly St. Patrick		Lackawanna	1854	Southern Erie	
Queen of Angels; Our Lady of the Sacred Heart Parish formerly St. Michael the Archangel		Lackawanna	1921	Southern Erie	Established in 1921 as the third Polish personal parish in Lackawanna, St. Michael the Archangel is situated within the larger parish of the much larger OLV Basilica. In 2008, as part of the Journey in Faith and Grace, Our Lady of Grace in Woodlawn and St. Barbara and St. Hyacinth Churches in Lackawanna were merged with St. Michael the Archangel to form Queen of Angels. This new parish continued to serve as a Polish personal parish in Lackawanna, as well as a territorial parish for the former Our Lady of Grace parish. In 2025, as part of the Road to Renewal, Queen of Angels was merged into Our Lady of the Sacred Heart Parish, alongside Our Mother of Divine Council in Blasdell and St. Anthony in Lackawanna. The Spanish language mass once hosted at St. Anthony moved to Queen of Angels, which continues to be used for regular worship.
St. John Paul II formerly Our Lady of Perpetual Help		Lake View	1922	Southern Erie	In 1922, a church was built in Lake View and dedicated to Our Lady of Perpetual Help. That first building served the growing parish until 1961, when a combination church/school was built. In 2001, a purpose built church was dedicated. In 2011, as part of the Journey in Faith and Grace, St. Vincent de Paul Church in North Evans merged with Our Lady of Perpetual Help at the OLPH site. The merged parish took the name of Blessed John Paul II, and became St. John Paul II, upon the former Pope's canonization.
Sacred Heart		Lakewood	1912	Southern Tier West	In 1912, Sacred Heart was founded. In 2008, as part of the Journey in Faith and Grace, Our Lady of the Snows in Panama was merged into Sacred Heart, continuing as a worship site until 2025, when it was closed.
Our Lady of Pompeii; St. Mary of the Assumption Parish		Lancaster	1909	Southern Erie	An Italian parish, Our Lady of Pompeii was organized in 1909, and a small church was built to hold the small congregation. The parish was formally organized in 1932 as a personal parish for Italians. In 1954, a fire destroyed the church and a larger building was constructed to replace it. In 2009, as part of the Journey in Faith and Grace, SS. Peter & Paul Church in Depew was merged into Our Lady of Pompeii, with SS. Peter & Paul disposed of by 2016. In 2025, Our Lady of Pompeii was merged into St. Mary of the Assumption Parish across the railroad truss in Lancaster, with Our Lady of Pompeii continuing as a worship site of St. Mary.
St. Mary of the Assumption		Lancaster	1850	Southern Erie	
Epiphany of our Lord formerly St. Martin of Tours		Langford	1849	Southern Tier West	In 1849, a frame church was erected in Langford, and St. Martin was established as a mission of St. Mary in East Eden. It became an independent parish in 1878, and the present church was built in 1902. The parish school closed in 1970. In 2008, as part of the Journey in Faith and Grace, St. Martin of Tours in Langford was merged with St. Frances Cabrini in Collins Center and St. Mary of the Immaculate Conception in New Oregon to form Epiphany of our Lord Parish, with regular worship taking place only at the St. Martin site.
Our Lady of Mercy formerly St. Peter		Le Roy	1849	Geneseee Wyoming	Founded as St. Peter in 1849. In 2008, as part of the Journey in Faith and Grace, St. Peter was merged with St. Anthony in Lime Rock and St. Joseph, also in Le Roy, to form Our Lady of Mercy, using only the St. Peter site.
Our Lady of Fatima		Lewiston	1960	None	Minor basilica built in 1965 and owned and staffed by the Barnabite Fathers
St. Peter		Lewiston	1851	Niagara Orleans	
All Saints formerly St. Patrick		Lockport	1864	Niagara Orleans	Founded as St. Patrick in 1864, this church was created as a result of an influx of Irish migrants fleeing the Great Famine. In 2008, as part of the Journey in Faith and Grace, St. Patrick was merged with St. Anthony and St. Joseph, both in Lockport, to form All Saints. St. Mary, also in Lockport, objected to the merger, but was merged into All Saints in 2011, formally becoming extinct in 2018. St. Patrick was maintained as the parish church and St. Joseph was maintained as an oratory. In 2025, as part of the Road to Renewal, All Saints was slated to be merged into St. John the Baptist parish in Lockport, with St. Patrick Church no longer to be used. That decision was appealed to the Vatican, and the church remains open during that appeal process.
St. John the Baptist		Lockport	1834	Niagara Orleans	
St. Joseph oratory of All Saints		Lockport	1912	Niagara Orleans	Organization of Italian families in Lockport began in 1911 and, by 1912, St. Joseph was established as a personal parish for the Italian community, with the first church dedicated on December 29 of that same year. On June 17, 1956, a second church was dedicated. In 2008, as part of the Journey in Faith and Grace, St. Joseph was merged with St. Anthony and St. Patrick to form All Saints Parish. St. Patrick became the parish church with St. Joseph relegated to the status of an oratory. As part of the Road to Renewal, St. Joseph Oratory was set to be closed and reduced to profane use by June 2, 2025. However, the decision to close All Saints was appealed to the Vatican, and the church remains open during the appeals process.
St. Mary; St. Mary of Lourdes		Mayville	1925	Southern Tier West	In 2008, as part of the Journey in Faith and Grace, St. Mary was merged with Our Lady of Lourdes in Bemus Point to form St. Mary of Lourdes Parish. Both sites are utilized for regular worship.
Holy Trinity formerly St. Mary		Medina	1840	Niagara Orleans	St. Mary was founded in 1840, and the present church was built in 1904. In 2008, St. Mary merged with Sacred Heart of Jesus, also in Medina, and St. Stephen in Middleport to found Holy Trinity parish, using the St. Mary and St. Stephen sites. The St. Stephen site closed in 2025 as part of the Road to Renewal.
St. Bridget; St. Brendan on the Lake Parish		Newfane	1859	Niagara Orleans	St. Bridget was founded in 1859. As part of the Journey in Faith and Grace, St. Bridget merged with St. Charles Borromeo in Olcott and Our Lady of the Rosary in Wilson to form St. Brendan on the Lake.
St. Leo; St. Vincent de Paul Parish		Niagara	1957	Niagara Orleans	St. Leo, established in 1957 and located in the Town of Niagara, was merged with Prince of Peace in 2008 to form St. Vincent de Paul Parish as part of the Journey in Faith and Grace. Both sites are used by the parish.
Prince of Peace; St. Vincent de Paul Parish		Niagara Falls	1944	Niagara Orleans	Prince of Peace, established in 1944, was merged with St. Leo in 2008 to form St. Vincent de Paul Parish as part of the Journey in Faith and Grace. Both sites are used by the parish.
St. John de LaSalle		Niagara Falls	1907	Niagara Orleans	As part of the Road to Renewal, St. John de LaSalle was set to be closed by 2025. However, that decision was appealed to the Vatican, and the church remains open during that appeal process.
St. Joseph; Holy Family of Jesus, Mary & Joseph Parish		Niagara Falls	1903	Niagara Orleans	Holy Family was founded as St. Joseph Church in 1903 and served a largely Italian community. The first church, also dedicated in 1903, seated 350 people. By 1920, the congregation had outgrown their original church and a large edifice, seating 1,000 people, was dedicated. This brick church was designed by William Alban Cannon in the Romanesque-Lombardi style. In 2008, Our Lady of the Mount Carmel Parish, also in Niagara Falls, merged with St. Joseph to form Holy Family of Jesus, Mary & Joseph Parish.
St. Mary of the Cataract; Holy Family of Jesus, Mary & Joseph Parish		Niagara Falls	1836	Niagara Orleans	Catholicism in Niagara Falls dates to the time of Fr. Louis Hennepin, who, in 1678, was the first European to view the Falls. In 1836, St. Mary was founded as the first Catholic parish in Niagara Falls and, by 1847 the present church was constructed. St. Mary is the oldest church building in the Diocese of Buffalo and the sacristy, which was constructed as a stable in 1813, is the oldest structure in Niagara Falls. The right side tower, at a height of 110 feet from its base to the tip of its steeple, is the same height as the American Falls. In 2025, as part of the Road to Renewal, St. Mary of the Cataract was merged into Holy Family of Jesus, Mary & Joseph Parish.
Our Lady of Czestochowa		North Tonawanda	1903	Northern Erie	Our Lady of Czestochowa was founded as a Polish parish in 1903 under the direction of Buffalo bishop James Quigley, and worshiped initially in a former Presbyterian church that had been converted for Catholic use. That wood-frame building was located immediately north of the present church, on what's now the site of the grotto garden, and was raffled and moved off the property in 1927. Masses were then held in the basement of the school on a temporary basis pending the completion of the present building. Dedicated in 1928, this brick church building, the work of the Buffalo-based architectural firm of Dietel & Wade, is exemplary of the Gothic Revival style. In 2008, as part of the Journey in Faith and Grace, St. Joseph Church, also in North Tonawanda, merged into Our Lady of Czestochowa. In 2025, as part of the Road to Renewal, St. Francis of Assisi Church in Tonawanda, which gave up some of its territory in 1903 so that Our Lady of Czestochowa could be founded, was merged into Our Lady of Czestochowa. A chapel/columbarium of St. Francis will continue to operate as an oratory of Our Lady of Czestochowa.
St. Francis of Assisi oratory of Our Lady of Czestochowa		North Tonawanda	1852	Northern Erie	The earliest of what would ultimately be six Roman Catholic parishes serving the twin cities of Tonawanda and North Tonawanda, St. Francis of Assisi traces its history back to August 1849, when Buffalo bishop John Timon dispatched the Rev. Sergius Schoulepnikoff to minister to the citizens of what was that a rapidly growing lumbering port at the mouth of Tonawanda Creek, near the west end of the Erie Canal. Though the Rev. Schoulepnikoff was Russian-born, the local Catholic community at the time was mostly of German and Alsatian heritage; accordingly, by 1853 - the year after the formal foundation of the parish - he had been succeeded in his post by the Rev. Francis Uhrich, the first in a nearly unbroken string of German-speaking pastors who would preach at St. Francis for the following half-century plus. The original wood-frame chapel on Franklin Street was superseded in 1862 by its first proper church building (pictured here), a handsome stone structure erected by mason and parish trustee Constantine Schimminger that served the congregation for nearly a century thereafter. By March 1954, when plans were unveiled for the construction of a new church on Broad Street, the parish's population had ballooned to a tally of 4,000. After the dedication of the new building, the 1862 church was reused variously as a gymnasium for the parochial school and for storage until its renovation and rededication in 1993 as a columbarium and chapel, playing host to a limited schedule of baptisms, weddings, funeral services, and other special-event Masses as the need arises. Out of its original territory, the parishes of Ascension, Our Lady of Czestochowa, St. Joseph, St. Albert the Great, St. Stephen, St. Paul, St. Christopher, St. Edmund, St. Timothy and St. Jude the Apostle were formed. In 2025, as part of the Road to Renewal, St. Francis of Assisi was merged into Our Lady of Czestochowa. Because of its use as a columbarium, the 1862 church building will be used by Our Lady of Czestochowa as an oratory for occasional masses, even as the rest of the sprawling campus is sold off.
St. Cecilia; Resurrection Parish		Oakfield	1906	Geneseee Wyoming	St. Cecilia was founded in 1906. As part of the Journey in Faith and Grace, St. Cecilia merged with St. Patrick in Wheatville in 2008, and Our Lady of Fatima in Elba in 2009 to form Padre Pio Parish. All three sites were used until St. Patrick, now an oratory, was closed in 2013. Padre Pio Parish itself was merged into Resurrection Parish in Batavia as part of the Road to Renewal in 2024, with St. Cecilia continuing as a worship site of Resurrection.
St. John the Evangelist		Olean	1896	Southern Tier East	In 2010, as part of the Journey in Faith and Grace, St. Helen Church in Hinsdale and Transfiguration Church in Olean were merged into St. John. In 2025, as part of the Road to Renewal, St. John the Evangelist was slated to merge into St. Mary of the Angels Basilica Parish, remaining open as a secondary worship site. However, the decision to merge St. John the Evangelist was appealed to the Vatican, and the church remains independent during the appeals process.
St. Mary of the Angels Basilica		Olean	1852	Southern Tier East	In 1989, Sacred Heart Church in Knapp Creek was merged into St. Mary of the Angels.
St. Charles Borromeo; St. Brendan on the Lake Parish		Olcott	1912	Niagara Orleans	St. Charles was founded in 1912. As part of the Journey in Faith and Grace, St. Charles merged with St. Bridget in Newfane and Our Lady of the Rosary in Wilson to form St. Brendan on the Lake. St. Charles is a seasonal worship site of St. Brendan on the Lake, hosting masses during the summer months.
Nativity of our Lord		Orchard Park	1908	Southern Erie	
Our Lady of the Sacred Heart		Orchard Park	1920	Southern Erie	Expansion in the steel industry brought a large population growth to the Windom area and prompted Fr. Nelson Baker to construct a mission chapel in 1920. In 1929, after a tornado destroyed the chapel, a combination church/school building was constructed. This served as the main church until the present church was built in 1965. In 2025, as part of the Road to Renewal, Our Mother of Good Council in Blasdell and Queen of Angels and St. Anthony in Lackawanna were merged into Our Lady of the Sacred Heart, with Our Lady of the Sacred Heart as the main church and Queen of Angels as a secondary worship site.
St. Bernadette		Orchard Park	1958	Southern Erie	In 1958, St. Bernadette was founded. An auditorium was erected in 1959, and served as the parish's home for a decade before a purpose built church could be dedicated. A school operated from 1959 until it was controversially closed by the Buffalo Diocese in 2014. In 2025, as part of the Road to Renewal, St. Bernadette was slated to be merged into SS Peter & Paul in Hamburg, staying open as a secondary worship site. However, the decision to merge St. Bernadette was appealed to the Vatican, and the church remains independent during the appeals process.
St. John Vianney		Orchard Park	1958	Southern Erie	In 1958, St. John Vianney was founded. An auditorium was erected that same year, and served as the parish's home until 1987, when a purpose built church was dedicated. A school operated from 1960 until 2025. In 2025, as part of the Road to Renewal, St. John Vianney was slated to be merged into Queen of Heaven in West Seneca, and closed. However, the decision to merge St. John Vianney was appealed to the Vatican, and the church remains open during the appeals process.
St. Mary; Mary Immaculate Parish		Pavilion	1862	Geneseee Wyoming	St. Mary was founded in 1862 as a mission of St. Joseph Church in Batavia. A Father Cunningham oversaw the construction of the church building, which was dedicated in 1865. The first resident priest, Fr. Thomas Milde, was appointed in 1887. As part of the Journey in Faith and Grace, St. Mary was merged with Immaculate Conception Church in East Bethany to form Mary Immaculate Parish on September 1, 2010. Both sites were utilized for worship until the Road to Renewal, when Immaculate Conception was closed on December 8, 2024.
Good Shepherd		Pendleton	1847	Northern Erie	Good Shepherd was founded in 1847 as "The Church on the Canal". Mass was held in the homes of Catholics who had been gathered by Fr. John Neumann. The first church, a log structure, was dedicated on December 30, 1849. That was followed by a brick church, which serves the parish to this day. It was dedicated on December 2, 1855. On August 28, 1859, the hitherto nameless parish was finally given its name. In 2009, as part of the Journey in Faith and Grace, St. Augustine Church in Clarence Center was merged into Good Shepherd. St. Augustine was used for regular masses until 2025 when, as part of the Road to Renewal, it was closed.
Sacred Heart		Portville	1882	Southern Tier East	Established in 1882, Sacred Heart became an independent parish in 1909. In 2007, Sacred Heart was merged into St. Mary of the Angels in Olean and retained as an oratory.
St. Patrick		Randolph	1853	Southern Tier West	
Immaculate Conception		Ransomville	1891	Niagara Orleans	
Our Lady of Peace formerly Holy Cross		Salamanca	1893	Southern Tier East	In 2007, as part of the Journey in Faith and Grace, Holy Cross was merged with St. Patrick in Salamanca to form Our Lady of Peace, utilizing the Holy Cross site. In 2014, St. Patrick in Limestone was merged into Our Lady of Peace. In 2025, Our Lady of Peace was slated to be merged into Holy Name of Mary in Ellicottville, remaining as a site for regular worship.
Holy Family		Sanborn	1891	Niagara Orleans	Located on the Tuscarora Indian Reservation
St. Cecilia; St. John Neumann Parish		Sheldon	1848	Geneseee Wyoming	A mission in Sheldon was established by Fr. John Neumann, who said the first mass in Sheldon in 1837. The first church, constructed from logs, was built a year later, with Fr. Neumann officiating the groundbreaking. In 1848, a second church was built and the parish was organized under the name St. Cecilia. Construction began on the present church in 1889, and the first service was held on January 31, 1892. In 2007, as part of the Journey in Faith and Grace, St. Cecila was merged with St. Nicholas in Java, St. Patrick in Java Center, and St. Mary, Queen of the Rosary in Strykersville to form St. John Neumann Parish. St. Patrick was used as an oratory until 2017, and St. Cecilia and St. Mary continued to be used for worship until 2025, when St. Mary was closed under the Road to Renewal.
Our Lady of Mount Carmel		Silver Creek	1908	Southern Tier West	In 2008, as part of the Journey in Faith and Grace, St. Rose of Lime Church in Forestville was merged into Our Lady of Mount Carmel, with both sites used for worship until 2025, when St. Rose was closed.
St. Andrew		Sloan	1915	Buffalo	St. Andrew was founded in 1915 to tend to the spiritual needs of the Roman Catholic community in Sloan, which grew up around the rail yards and machine shops of the Delaware, Lackawanna & Western Railroad. Then as now, most parishioners were of Polish ethnicity; many of them had been former members of St. John Kanty parish on the East Side of Buffalo. Dedicated in 1956, the current church building is the work of architect Joseph E. Fronczak and, with its straight lines and simplified forms and the flat roof and geometric ornamentation on the tower, exemplifies the Modernist style of architecture.
Christ the King		Snyder	1926	Northern Erie	Dedicated on October 27, 1929 - the feast of Christ the King, hence the church's name - this is a design in which Dietel & Wade employ a Tudor Revival style that fits like a glove with the upscale, countrified, somewhat rustic aesthetic that characterized the overall architectural ambience of the neighborhood at the time. It's a brilliant manifestation of the Tudor aesthetic, checking all the requisite boxes: a composite exterior comprising stone cladding, brick, and half-timbered stucco; an asymmetrical façade wherein the entrance is set off-center at the base of a stubby tower with crenellated parapet atop, which together embody the requisite bottom-heavy, sprawling massing; the trademark bluntly pointed arches and steeply pitched roof.
St. Vincent de Paul		Spring Brook	1850	Geneseee Wyoming	
St. Aloysius; St. Mary Parish		Springville	1853	Southern Tier East	Founded in 1853 by Buffalo bishop John Timon to serve a diminutive but bustling community of dairy farmers and small-town denizens, the ragtag early years of the parish saw Masses held in temporary spaces and helmed by travelling preachers dispatched from Buffalo, Ellicottville, and Java. The 1869 purchase of the former Old Congregational Church coincided with the arrival of St. Aloysius' first resident pastor, one Rev. S. Ulrich, who stayed on the job for four years and whose successor, the Rev. Francis X. Fromholzer, oversaw the construction of its replacement in 1876. Of course, the steady growth of Springville's population over the following decades eventually made necessary the construction of an even larger replacement for the 1876 church, but it wasn't until September 1952 that architect Joseph Fronczak revealed his plans for the $300,000, 700-seat sanctuary that would eventually be built. The present church was dedicated in 1855. A school was in operation from 1879 to 2022. In 2025, as part of the Road to Renewal, St. Aloysius was merged into St. Mary Parish in Arcade, remaining open for regular daily and weekly masses.
St. Mary		Swormville	1849	Northern Erie	One of the oldest churches in the Catholic Diocese of Buffalo, St. Mary's (or, as it was originally known, St. Mary's of the Assumption) has a history that dates back to the 1830s and is closely tied up with that of the hamlet in which it's located: Swormville, a community straddling the Amherst/Clarence town line that was gathered around the tavern and general store operated by Bavarian immigrant Adam Schworm, and whose initially German, Alsatian, and French settlers were overwhelmingly Catholic and desirous of a house of worship to call their own. Father John Nepomucene Neumann (later Saint John Neumann, the first male American Catholic to be canonized by the Vatican) was a local representative of the Redemptorist order whose job it was to hold services for those scattered Catholic communities of rural Western New York that were too small to sustain full-fledged parishes of their own. Father Neumann held Mass and administered sacraments wherever he could: first at the homes and barns of local residents, then beginning in 1839 at a converted log cabin that served as St. Mary's first permanent home. After Neumann's move to Philadelphia the next year, services were held even less frequently, usually by priests who visited periodically from SS. Peter and Paul in Williamsville. With the continued growth of Swormville, however, Buffalo bishop John Timon reestablished St. Mary's as a full-fledged parish in 1849 complete with its own resident pastor, Rev. John B. Menauer. Sixteen years later came the construction of its second and current home, this simple but handsome brick church building in a vernacular Romanesque Revival style (note the round arches crowning the entrance and stained-glass windows as well as the raking cornel tabes underneath the eaves of the roof). This building served as the main church for the parish until 2010, when a modern church seating over 1,000 people was constructed. The 1865 structure continues to serve as a chapel.
Blessed Sacrament		Tonawanda	1929	Northern Erie	Blessed Sacrament's history stretches back to 1929, when a community of Catholics living in the Kenilworth section of Tonawanda petitioned Bishop William Turner for the foundation of a new parish. These people had heretofore attended St. Joseph's on Main Street but wanted to worship in a more convenient location closer to their homes. Bishop Turner assented, assigning Rev. Michael Fitzgerald to the role of pastor, and the first Mass was held on December 8 of that year in the Kenilworth Fire Hall. They would remain in that temporary home for the next ten months. The combination church and school building that was the congregation's first permanent home was dedicated in 1930 and served in that role for nearly three decades, after which time the postwar flight to the suburbs had swelled their ranks sufficiently that a larger building was deemed necessary. This second church, dedicated in 1959, was intended as a temporary structure that would fill the gap until a proper church could be built, but it wasn't until June 1978 when ground was broken for the latter. The $700,000 building was designed by Edward J. Trautman and was dedicated in April of the following year. In 2025, as part of the Road to Renewal, Blessed Sacrament was set to be merged into St. John the Baptist Parish in Kenmore, and its properties disposed of. However, the decision to merge Infant of Prague was appealed to the Vatican, and the church remains open during the appeals process.
St. Amelia		Tonawanda	1953	Northern Erie	St. Amelia's owes its existence to the wave of suburbanization that, beginning around the 1920s but especially after the Second World War, pushed America's affluent citizens outside the boundaries of cities proper. Bishop Joseph Burke of the Buffalo diocese recognized the need for new parishes to serve these newly minted suburbanites, and St. Amelia - which Burke founded in 1953, named after his mother, and staffed with his own secretary, Monsignor John Lodge McHugh, as head pastor - was among them. The first few Masses were held in donated facilities, such as the auditorium of Mount St. Mary Academy or outdoors on the grounds of Brighton Fire Hall - during the two years in which the original church (now in use as a gymnasium) was under construction. The school, too, was completed in 1955 and is seen at the right-hand side of the photograph. By 1960, Tonawanda had earned the distinction of being the first suburban community in the U.S. to surpass 100,000 in population, and growth of St. Amelia's parish was equally meteoric - the school building was expanded repeatedly on its way to the status as the largest one in the Buffalo Diocese, and when the second and current church building was completed in 1970, it too had the largest seating capacity of any in the diocese, with room for 1,500 congregants. The building's design was the work of architect Ed Egan, also a St. Amelia's parishioner.
St. Andrew Kim		Tonawanda	2001	Northern Erie	In 2001, after meeting in borrowed spaces for 26 years, Buffalo's Korean Catholic community built a small church of their own adjacent to Cardinal O'Hara High School. In 2025, as part of the Road to Renewal, the parish was slated to close.
St. Christopher		Tonawanda	1935	Northern Erie	In 1928, St. Christopher began as a mission of St. John de LaSalle in Niagara Falls. By 1935, the mission grew into a full parish, with Fr. Bertram Trautman serving as the first pastor. The first church, built in 1928, burned down in 1988. In 2007, as part of the Journey in Faith and Grace, St. Edmund Parish, also in Tonawanda, merged into St. Christopher and closed. In 2025, as part of the Road to Renewal, St. Jude the Apostle Parish in North Tonawanda, merged into St. Christopher and closed.
St. Timothy		Tonawanda	1960	Northern Erie	
St. Joseph; St. John Neumann Parish		Varysburg	1910	Geneseee Wyoming	St. Joseph was founded in 1910. In 1911, the present 200-seat English Gothic church was built. In 2008, as part of the Journey in Faith and Grace, St. Joseph merged with St. Vincent de Paul in Attica to form SS Joachim & Anne Parish, utilizing both sites for worship. In 2025, as part of the Road to Renewal, SS Joachim and Anne was merged into St. John Neumann Parish, with both sites remaining in continuous use.
St. Michael		Warsaw	1858	Geneseee Wyoming	St. Michael was founded in 1858 as a mission of Assumption Church in Portageville. The first resident priest, Fr. John Fitzpatrick, was appointed in 1869. The carpenter gothic church building was dedicated in 1888. In 2024, as part of the Road to Renewal, St. Isidore Parish, comprising St. Joseph Church in Perry and St. Mary Church in Silver Springs, was merged into St. Michael, with both sites of St. Isidore closing.
Immaculate Conception		Wellsville	1851	Southern Tier East	Mass was first said in Wellsville in 1850, and Immaculate Conception was established as an independent parish by 1860. In 2025, as part of the Road to Renewal, the neighboring parishes of SS Brendan & Jude in Alfred and Almond, Blessed Sacrament in Andover, Holy Family in Belmont (with oratory St. Joseph in Scio), St. Mary in Bolivar, and Our Lady of the Angels in Cuba were merged into Immaculate Conception.
St. James Major; St. Dominic Parish		Westfield	1860	Geneseee Wyoming	In 2008, as part of the Journey in Faith and Grace, St. James Major was merged with St. Thomas More in Ripley and St. Patrick in Brocton to form St. Dominic Parish.
St. George oratory of Immaculate Conception Parish		West Falls	1912	Geneseee Wyoming	St. George was established in 1912 as a mission of Nativity of our Lord Church in Orchard Park. Their first church building, later called the Memorare Chapel, was dedicated in the same year. In 1942, St. George became an independent parish, with Fr. Herald Gonter serving as the first pastor. In 1958, a larger church building was built behind the Memorare Chapel. On June 7, 2025, as part of the Road to Renewal, St. George was merged into Immaculate Conception Parish in East Aurora, with the 1958 church building closed and set to be sold. The Memorare Chapel was retained as an oratory of Immaculate Conception and is used for weekday masses.
Queen of Heaven		West Seneca	1955	Southern Erie	In 2008, as part of the Journey in Faith and Grace, St. Catherine of Siena, also in West Seneca, merged into Queen of Heaven, with the St. Catherine property disposed of. In 2025, as part of the Road to Renewal, Fourteen Holy Helpers and St. John XXIII in West Seneca, and St. John Vianney in Orchard Park were set to be merged into Queen of Heaven, with only Fourteen Holy Helpers remaining open as a secondary worship site. However, St. John Vianney and St. John XIII are appealing the merger to the Vatican, and any merger remains on hold until all appeals are exhausted.
St. John XXIII formerly St. William		West Seneca	1926	Southern Erie	In 1925, a census undertaken by the diocese found a severe deficit in catechetical instruction among Catholic children in the Winchester neighborhood, which underscored the need for more parishes in the area. Cleaved off the massive territory of Fourteen Holy Helpers in nearby Gardenville, St. William was established the following year, with founding pastor Fr. William Bernet holding Mass on a temporary basis at the Winchester Fire Hall until their first permanent church building, a simple wood-frame structure located on the same site as the present one, was completed the following year. Financial problems brought on by the onset of the Great Depression, which led to the closure of the parochial school and led many to fear the parish would become insolvent and close, were staved off through the heroic efforts of Rev. Bernet's successor, Rev. Francis Growney, who served as pastor for nearly forty years. The parish's resumption growth after the twin challenges of the Depression and World War II led to the need for a new and larger building, which was constructed at a cost of $400,000, consecrated on August 11, 1957 by Bishop Joseph Burke. In 2008, as a part of the Journey in Faith and Grace consolidation program, St. William merged with the neighboring parish of St. Bonaventure. The new parish's name, Blessed John XIII, was chosen by Buffalo's then-bishop Edward Kmiec from a list of 35 suggestions proffered by parishioners. In 2025, as part of the Road to Renewal, St. John XXIII was slated to be merged with Queen of Heaven, and then close. However, the decision to merge St. John Vianney was appealed to the Vatican, and the church remains open during the appeals process.
SS Peter & Paul		Williamsville	1836	Northern Erie	In 1834, land was donated to build a Catholic church in Williamsville. In 1836, only the walls were completed when Fr. John Neumann arrived as the first resident pastor, saying his first mass in the roofless, floorless building. Neumann departed in 1840, but the parish continued to grow and, in 1866, the current building was dedicated.
Our Lady of the Rosary; St. Brendan on the Lake Parish		Wilson	1920	Niagara Orleans	Our Lady of the Rosary was founded in 1920 and moved into a former Presbyterian building in 1931. As part of the Journey in Faith and Grace, Our Lady of the Rosary merged with St. Bridget in Newfane and St. Charles Borromeo in Olcott to form St. Brendan on the Lake. As part of the Road to Renewal, a reduction decree was promulgated effective January 7, 2025. That decision was appealed to the Vatican, and the church remains open during that appeal process.
St. Bernard; St. Peter Parish		Youngstown	1946	Niagara Orleans	Founded in 1946, St. Bernard merged into St. Peter in Lewiston in 2016. It continues to operate as a worship site of St. Peter.

=== Closed churches ===
The year of closure is the year the last mass was celebrated.

Name	Image	Location	Founded	Closed	Description/Notes
St. Mary of the Assumption		Albion	1891	2007	In 1891, Fr. Bartholomew Swinko established St. Mary as a personal parish for Poles in Albion. A brownstone church was built at the corner of Brown and Moore Streets in 1892. In 2007, as part of the Journey in Faith and Grace, St. Mary merged with St. Joseph in Albion to become Holy Family Parish. St Mary was used as an oratory for a time. The building was sold in 2011 to Light of Victory Church.
St. Brendan		Almond	1949	2025	In 1949, St. Brendan was established as a parish of the Rural Missionary Apostolate. It established a chapel in Alfred, St. Jude, in 1959, which would later become an independent parish. In 1970, St. Brendan received its first pastor and, in 1992, was merged with St. Jude to form SS Brendan & Jude, utilizing both sites for worship. In 2025, as part of the Road to Renewal, SS Brendan & Jude was merged into Immaculate Conception Parish in Wellsville, and St. Brendan was closed.
Blessed Sacrament/ St. John		Andover	1854	2025	Mass was first said in Andover in 1850. In 1852, St. John was formed, and a church was completed in 1855, costing $500. That church was never dedicated, but was expanded in 1864 and served the parish until 1885 when a new church, costing $12,000, was completed. It was dedicated as Blessed Sacrament a year later. In 2007, as part of the Journey in Faith in Grace, St. John of the Cross in Whitesville was merged into Blessed Sacrament. In 2025, as part of the Road to Renewal, Blessed Sacrament was merged into Immaculate Conception in Wellsville and closed.
Sacred Heart		Angelica	1848	2007	Founded in 1848, Sacred Heart's church (pictured here) was built in 1851. Variously an independent parish and a mission over its 150 year history, Sacred Heart was merged with St. Mary in Belmont and St. Joseph in Scio in 2007 as part of the Journey in Faith and Grace. The new parish, Holy Family of Jesus, Mary and Joseph did not use Sacred Heart Church and it was closed for masses. It was retained by the pasish as a mission of mercy.
St. Anthony		Batavia	1908	2012	In 1908, St. Anthony was established as a personal parish for the Italian community in Batavia. Fr. Hyacinth Ciabbatoni served as the first pastor. Mass was initially said in a social hall, and then in a converted house. A second church was in use from 1920 to 1953, when the final church building was constructed. In 2008, as part of the Journey in Faith and Grace, St. Anthony was merged with Sacred Heart Church to form Ascension Parish. St. Anthony was used for regular worship by the parish until 2012, when it was sold.
St. Mary		Batavia	1906	2024	St. Mary began in 1906 in a temporary chapel on Ellicott Street. The permanent church, designed by architect John H. Coxhead and built from Medina sandstone, was opened in 1907. In 2008, as part of the Journey in Faith and Grace, St. Mary was merged with St. Joseph Church to form Resurrection Parish. St. Mary was used for regular worship by the parish until 2024 when, as part of the Road to Renewal, it was closed.
Sacred Heart of Jesus		Bennington Center	1872	2024	In 1872, Bishop Ryan dedicated a new Catholic church in Bennington Center to the Sacred Heart of Jesus. A school was operated from 1873 to 1970. In 2008, Sacred Heart of Jesus was merged with Our Lady of Good Counsel in Darien Center and Our Lady Help of Christians in East Bennington to form Immaculate Heart of Mary Parish. Sacred Heart of Jesus continued as a worship site of the merged parish. In 2024, Immaculate Heart of Mary Parish was merged into St. John Neumann Parish, and Sacred Heart of Jesus was closed.
St. Mary		Birdsall	1850	1959	Always a rural mission church, St. Mary, located on Jersey Hill Road, was never large, and never had a resident priest. Towards the end of its existence, mass was only celebrated during the summer, and the church was attended by only 40 families. Given its size, the reason St. Mary has not slipped into obscurity is because it was the church that was "demolished by accident." In 1959, a contractor had been given the salvage rights to a disused Methodist church on a hill, and proceeded to demolish the wrong "church on the hill." The church was half demolished by the time Msgr. John Neylon arrived, and the contractor finished the job and gave a $500 donation to the parish. St. Mary was never rebuilt, and the remaining fixtures of the church were put to use at Sacred Heart Church in Angelica.
Our Mother of Good Counsel		Blasdell	1905	2025	Founded by Fr. Nelson Baker in 1905, Our Mother of Good Counsel competed its first building, a combination church/school, in 1906. A purpose built church, which served the parish for the remainder of its existence, was dedicated in 1953. A school was operated from 1906 to 2004. In 2025, as part of the Road to Renewal, Our Mother of Good Counsel was merged into Our Lady of the Sacred Heart and closed.
St. Joseph		Bliss	1907	2008	In 2008, as part of the Journey in Faith and Grace, St. Joseph was merged with St. Joseph in Perry, St. Stanislaus in Perry, Assumption in Portageville and St. Mary in Silver Springs to form St. Isidore Parish. St. Joseph was not utilized by the merged parish and closed.
St. Mary		Bolivar	1882	2025	In 1882, a church was built in Bolivar and dedicated to St. Mary. A second church was built in 1905. In 2025, as part of the Road to Renewal, St. Mary was merged into Immaculate Conception Parish in Wellsville and closed.
Our Lady of Mount Carmel		Brant	1906	2008	2008, as part of the Journey in Faith and Grace, Our Lady of Mt. Carmel was merged into St. Anthony in Farnham and closed. The building now houses the Parish of Our Lady, a parish of the Polish National Catholic Church.
St. Patrick		Brocton	1922	2025	In 2008, as part of the Journey in Faith and Grace, St. Patrick was merged with St. James Major in Westfield and St. Thomas More in Ripley to form St. Dominic Parish. St. Patrick was used for regular worship until 2025 when, as part of the Road to Renewal, it was closed.
St. Peter		Carrollton	1883	1996	In 1996, St. Peter, which had already been operating as a mission of St. Patrick in Limestone for some time, merged into St. Patrick and closed.
Immaculate Conception		Cassadaga	1940	2014	In 2008, as part of the Journey in Faith and Grace, Immaculate Conception was merged into St Anthony Parish in Fredonia and used for weekend masses until it closed in 2014.
St. Mary		Cattaraugus	1863	2025	On December 12, 1863, St. Mary was incorporated. Mass was held in homes and storefronts until 1886, when a church was built on Mill Street. In 1948, St. Mary was made the headquarters of the Rural Missionary Apostolate, which seeded more than a dozen parishes in the Southern Tier. A new church was dedicated in 1950 on Washington Street. In 1995, St. Isidore Church in East Otto merged into St. Mary and became an oratory. In 2007, as part of the Journey in Faith and Grace, St. Mary in Little Valley was merged into St. Mary and closed, and St. Isidore was closed. In 2025, as part of the Road to Renewal, St. Mary was merged into St. Joseph in Gowanda and closed.
Most Holy Redeemer		Cheektowaga	1913	2008	Most Holy Redeemer was founded in 1913 to serve a German-American community which at the time was expanding steadily eastward past the Buffalo city line and into the suburban Pine Hill section of the neighboring town of Cheektowaga. The original church building was erected in 1914 on the plot immediately west of the present-day building (to the right from the perspective of this photo; it's now the church's parking lot). The second and final church for the parish was dedicated in 1932. In 2008, as part of the Journey in Faith and Grace, Most Holy Redeemer was merged into St. Lawrence in Buffalo and closed. The church was purchased by True Vine Christian Center, a Pentecostal congregation.
Mother of Divine Grace		Cheektowaga	1946	2009	Mother of Dicine Grace is one of three parishes (the others were Infant of Prague and Queen of Martyrs) that trace their history back to May 1946, when they were founded simultaneously by Buffalo bishop John O'Hara to serve the Catholic residents of what was then a rapidly growing suburban community, founding pastor Rev. James Lucid held Mass in the community hall of the adjacent Tiorunda housing project while a permanent building was under construction. (A proposal by the Buffalo Common Council to sell them the mess hall of the then-city owned Municipal Airport for $1 was scuttled when it was discovered that the law prohibited the transfer of public property by any means other than auction.) Mother of Divine Grace used the building for worship continually until their merger with the aforementioned Infant of Prague in 2009 as part of the "Journey in Faith and Grace" parish consolidation program. Cedar Grove Baptist Church then purchased it from the diocese and has continued to hold services there ever since.
St. Elizabeth		Cherry Creek	1939	1992	St. Elizabeth was the first parish established as part of the Rural Missionary Apostolate. Already in 1991, St. Elizabeth, which counted 35families in its parish, was sharing a pastor with St. Joan of Arc in Perrysburg and St. John Fisher in South Dayton. It was closed in 1992.
St. Augustine		Clarence Center	1949	2025	In response to a petition from Catholics living near Rapids, Bishop John F. O'Hara organized St. Augustine Parish in 1949. Their only church building was dedicated in 1950. In 2008, as part of the Journey in Faith and Grace, St. Augustine was merged into Good Shepherd Parish in Pendleton and operated for the next seventeen years as a secondary church of Good Shepherd Parish. In 2025, as part of the Road to Renewal, St. Augustine was closed.
Our Lady of the Sacred Heart		Colden	1912	2008	In 2008, as part of the Journey in Faith and Grace, Our Lady of the Sacred Heart merged with St. George in West Falls and closed. The building us currently utilized as the Bread of Life Outreach Center,
St. Francis Cabrini		Collins Center	1955	2006	Established as a parish of the Rural Missionary Apostolate, St. Francis Cabrini merged with St. Martin in Langford and St. Mary of the Assumption in New Oregon in 2006 to form Epiphany of Our Lord Parish in Langford. St Francis was closed and sold.
St. Francis of Assisi		Corfu	1898	2024	St. Francis was founded in 1898, and its church was built that year. In 1920, the building was moved away from an area prone to flooding. As part of the Journey in Faith and Grace, St. Francis of Assisi was merged with Holy Name of Mary in East Pembroke and St. Patrick in Crittenden, becoming St. Maximilian Kolbe Parish in 2009. St. Francis continued to be used for regular worship in the merged parish. St. Maximilian Kolbe Parish itself was merged into Resurrection Parish in Batavia as part of the Road to Renewal in 2024, with St. Francis of Assisi closing at that time.
St. Patrick		Crittenden	1857	2007	In 2007, as part of the Journey in Faith and Grace, St. Patrick was merged with Holy Name of Mary in East Pembroke and St. Francis of Assisi in Corfu to form St. Maximilian Kolbe Parish. St. Patrick was no longer used and was sold in 2008 to be used as a private residence.
Our Lady of Good Counsel		Darien Center	1911	2024	In 1910, land was purchased to build a church in Darien. It was dedicated in 1911, and Fr. Emil Deck said the first mass at Our Lady of Good Council. A school was operated from 1912 to 1969. In 2008, Our Lady of Good Counsel was merged with Sacred Heart of Jesus in Bennington Center and Our Lady Help of Christians in East Bennington to form Immaculate Heart of Mary Parish. Our Lady of Good Council continued as a worship site of the merged parish. In 2024, Immaculate Heart of Mary Parish was merged into St. John Neumann Parish, and Our Lady of Good Counsel was closed.
St. Paul of the Cross		Dayton	1861	1988	
Blessed Sacrament		Delevan	1947	2007	Established in as part of the Rural Missionary Apostolate of the Diocese of Buffalo. In 2007, as part of the Journey in Faith and Grace, Blessed Sacrament was merged with SS Peter & Paul in Arcade and St. Mary in East Arcade to form St. Mary Parish. Blessed Sacrament was closed and sold.
St. Augustine		Depew	1902	2008	Established in 1902 as a Polish parish, St. Augustine completed its building in 1909, which would remain in use for the parish for 99 years until 2008, when it was merged with nearby St. James Church to form Blessed Teresa of Calcutta Parish and closed. The building was sold to a Wesleyan Church.
St. Barnabas		Depew	1960	2011	Founded in 1960 and boasting a stunning postmodernist church, St. Barnabas was, in 2011, merged with Our Lady of the Blessed Sacrament, one mile east on George Urban Boulevard, to form St. Martha Parish, using only the Our Lady of the Blessed Sacrament site. St. Barnabas was sold to the Cantalician Center for Learning, a Catholic school for those with developmental disabilities.
St. Mother Teresa of Calcutta/ St. James		Depew	1897	2025	In 2008, as part of the Journey in Faith and Grace, St. James was merged with St. Augustine in Depew to form Blessed Mother Teresa of Calcutta Parish, using only the St. James site. In 2025, as part of the Road to Renewal, St. Mother Teresa was merged into St. Mary of the Assumption in Lancaster and closed.
SS Peter & Paul		Depew	1896	2009	The first of what would become many Catholic churches in Depew, SS Peter & Paul was established by Buffalo bishop Stephen Ryan in 1896 as the spiritual home of a Polish-American populace that had been attracted to the village by easily available jobs on the railroads (a total of three separate lines, running roughly parallel to each other, pass through town) and in ancillary businesses. Soon enough, explosive population growth required the subdivision of the parish, with St. James and St. Augustine both cleaved off its territory within the next dozen years. SS. Peter & Paul would remain predominantly Polish in ethnic constitution for the entirety of its existence. In 2009, as part of the Journey in Faith and Grace, SS Peter & Paul was merged into Our Lady of Pompeii in Lancaster and closed.
Sacred Heart of Jesus/ St. George		Dunkirk	1857	1975	In 1857, a group of German Catholics from Dunkirk desired a parish of their own. In 1858, a church was built and dedicated to St. George. In 1876, a new church was dedicated and the parish was renamed to Sacred Heart of Jesus. In 1975, Sacred Heart was sold to the Dunkirk Urban Renewal Agency and the parish was merged with St. Mary in Dunkirk to form St. Elizabeth Ann Seton Parish, using the St. Mary property.
St. Hedwig		Dunkirk	1902	2025	In St. Hedwig was established as a personal parish for Poles in Dunkirk who lived south of the Lake Shore Railroad tracks. A temporary church was dedicated in 1903 and a more permanent church/school combination building was dedicated July 4, 1904. That structure did not last long, however, as fire destroyed it on December 29, 1905. A third St. Hedwig Church was dedicated on June 9, 1907. Designed by E.J. Bailey, this structure was unique in that the school was on the first floor and the church on the second. This would prove to be problematic as the congregation aged and, in 1973, a fourth church was dedicated. In 2008, St. Hedwig was merged with St. Hyacinth Church in Dunkirk to form Blessed Mary Angela Truszkowska Parish. Both sites were used for daily and weekly masses. In 2025, as part of the Road to Renewal, Blessed Mary Angela was suppressed into Holy Trinity Parish in Dunkirk. St. Hedwig closed in 2025.
Our Lady Help of Christians		East Bennington	1848	2008	In 2008, Our Lady Help of Christians was merged with Sacred Heart of Jesus in Bennington Center and Our Lady of Good Counsel in Darien Center to form Immaculate Heart of Mary Parish. Our Lady Help of Christians was not utilized, closed, and sold in 2010 to a private business.
Immaculate Conception		East Bethany	1953	2025	In 1953, Immaculate Conception was born as a parish of the Rural Missionary Apostolate, which gave birth to many rural Catholic parishes in the Diocese of Buffalo during the early to mid 20th Century. The first mass was held in the Bethany Town Hall on May 30, 1954, and the new church was dedicated in October of that same year. In 2010, as part of the Journey in Faith and Grace, Immaculate Conception was merged with St. Mary in Pavilion to form Mary Immaculate Parish. Immaculate Conception continued as an active church of that parish until the Road to Renewal in 2025, when it closed.
St. Isidore		East Otto	1955	2007	In 1955, Fr. Daniel Szostak of St. Mary in Cattaraugus rented a storefront in East Otto to establish a Catholic mission. 26 people attended the first mass. St. Isidore was established as an independent parish in 1957, but the storefront was used as the parish church until 1962, when it burned down. In 1963, a parish church was built. In 1995, St. Isidore became an oratory of St. Mary, and was closed in 2007.
Our Lady of Fatima		Elba	1947	2025	In 2009, as part of the Journey in Faith and Grace, Our Lady of Fatima was merged with St. Cecilia in Oakfield to inform St. Padre Pio Parish. In 2025, as part of the Road to Renewal, St. Padre Pio was merged into Resurrection Parish in Batavia, with Our Lady of Fatima closing.
Our Lady of Loreto		Falconer	1912	2025	Established as a personal parish for people of Italian descent living in Falconer, a church was erected and dedicated to Our Lady of Loreto in 1912. The first resident pastor, Fr. Peter Lozza, was appointed in 1920. In the 1920s, Our Lady of Loreto was converted into a territorial parish and a school, (which operated until 1969) convent and rectory were built. In 1951, a new church was dedicated. In 2025, as part of the Road to Renewal, Our Lady of Loreto was merged into St. James Parish in Jamestown and closed.
St. Anthony of Padua		Farnham	1904	2025	Established in 1904 by Bishop Charles Colton, St. Anthony served the mainly Italian population around Farnham. Its territory was taken from Most Precious Blood Parish in Angola. In 2008, as part of the Journey in Faith and Grace, Our Lady of Mount Carmel Church in Brant was merged into St. Anthony. In 2025, as part of the Road to Renewal, St. Anthony was merged back into Most Precious Blood in Angola and closed.
St. Rose of Lima		Forestville	1861	2025	Land was purchased in 1860 to build a church in Forestville. In 1861, the first church was completed. Another plot was purchased in 1872, and this new church was named St. Rose of Lima. In 1931, the parish received its first resident priest and the church was moved to Center Street. In 2008, as part of the Journey in Faith and Grace, St. Rose was merged into Our Lady of Mount Carmel Parish in Silver Creek, and was retained as a site for regular worship. On January 5, 2025, as part of the Road to Renewal, St. Rose of Lima hosted its last mass. After that mass, a petition was filed with the Vatican to prevent the closure and sale of St. Rose. However, no further masses have been held in the church.
St. Anthony		Fredonia	1905	2026	St. Anthony was founded in 1905 as a personal parish for those of Italian descent living in and around Fredonia. Its first building served the parish from 1906 to 1952, when it burned. A new church was dedicated in 1953. The parish was staffed by the Scalabrini Fathers until 1975, when Buffalo Diocese priests took over administration. In 2008, as part of the Journey in Faith and Grace, Immaculate Conception in Cassadaga and St. John the Evangelist in Sinclairville were merged into St. Anthony and closed, and St. Anthony added a territorial designation to its parish. In 2026, as part of the Road to Renewal, St. Anthony was merged into Holy Trinity Parish in Dunkirk and closed, its last mass being held on August 30.
St. Joseph		Fredonia	1898	2024	Taking its Fredonia territory from St. Mary Church in Dunkirk, St. Joseph was established in 1898. Its church building was completed in 1900, and a school was operated from 1914 to 1989. In the 1940s, it was the first headquarters for the Rural Apostolate, which created over a dozen parishes. In 1951, it established the Newman Center at SUNY Fredonia, which operated until 2018. In 2024, as part of the Road to Renewal, Holy Trinity Parish in Dunkirk, erstwhile a personal parish, was transformed a territorial parish, and St. Joseph was merged into it. The last mass was held at midnight on Christmas, 2024.
Our Lady of Victory		Frewsburg	1941	2025	Established as part of the Rural Missionary Apostolate, Our Lady of Victory first met for mass in a converted Swedish Covenant church. In 1950, Our Lady of Victory received its first resident pastor, Fr. John Smith and, in 1960, a purpose built church was dedicated. In 2008, as part of the Journey in Faith and Grace, Our Lady of Victory was merged into St. James Parish in Jamestown and retained as an oratory. In 2025, Our Lady of Victory was closed.
Sacred Heart		Friendship	1890	2007	In 1995, Sacred Heart became a mission of Our Lady of the Angels in Cuba. It merged into Our Lady of the Angels in 2004, and was retained as an oratory until 2007, when it was closed.
St. Mary		Gasport	1858	2008	A 30x40 foot church was erected in 1858 to serve Catholics in Gasport. Priests were shared with Barker, Newfane and Middleport for the next 90 years until 1968, when Fr. Arnold Schneider was appointed. In 2008, as part of the Journey in Faith and Grace, St. Mary was merged into St. John the Baptist Parish in Lockport and closed. The building was sold in 2009 to Heartland Bible Church.
St. Helen		Hinsdale	1947	2009	In 2009, as part of the Journey in Faith and Grace, St. Helen was merged into St. John the Evangelist in Olean and closed. It was purchased by the Town of Hinsdale to be used as a museum.
St. Rocco		Hulberton	1906	2007	St. Rocco was established in 1906 to serve the Italian community at Hulberton. In 1991, it was noted that 50 families were registered in the parish. By 2007, it was an oratory of St. Mary in Holley, and was closed and sold during the Journey in Faith and Grace. The building was sold in 2009 to Cornerstone Community Church.
St. Joseph		Jamestown	1927	1971	Located at 1159 Main North Street, across the street from SS Peter & Paul School, St. Joseph was merged into SS Peter & Paul Parish and closed.
St. Patrick		Java Center	1838	2008	In 2008, as part of the Journey in Faith and Grace, St. Patrick was merged with St. Nicholas in North Java, St. Cecilia in Sheldon, and St. Mary of the Rosary in Strykersville to form St. John Neumann Parish. St. Patrick was initially retained as an oratory but saw little use and was relegated to profane use in 2017.
St. Mark		Kendall	1984	2025	As part of the Road to Renewal, merged into St. Mary in Holley and closed in 2025.
Sacred Heart		Knapp Creek	1896	1989	At an elevation of 2,400 feet, Sacred Heart was the highest church in the Diocese of Buffalo. Never large - it was attended by 14 families at the time of its closure - Sacred Heart was staffed by Franciscan friars from St. Bonaventure for many decades. The retirement of Fr. Maurice Scheier spurred the merger of Sacred Heart into St. Mary of the Angels in Olean in 1989. The church was demolished later that year.
Assumption of the Blessed Virgin Mary		Lackawanna	1918	2006	Established as a personal parish for Hungarians living in and around Lackawanna, Assumption's founding relieved Hungarians from traveling to Black Rock in Buffalo to attend St. Elizabeth Church there. Its founding core was 75 families who had been attending St. Charles Church on Ridge Road. By the 1950s, as demographics in the First Ward were changing, homilies in Spanish were added. In 2006, the parish, served by two octogenarian Piarist Fathers, was closed, having dwindled to only 20 families, with an average mass attendance of 12.
Queen of All Saints/ St. Charles		Lackawanna	1903	1998	St. Charles was established in 1903 as a territorial parish for residents of Lackawanna living west of the railroad tracks. In 1932, the Black Apostolate was established in Lackawanna by Fr. Nelson Baker and a mission church, Queen of All Saints, was started, in the St. Charles building. In 1949, the two churches merged, taking the name Queen of All Saints and assuming the territory of St. Charles. By the 1960s, the parish was ethnically diverse, with black, white, and Hispanic parishoners. By 1998, when it merged into St. Lawrence, an Italian personal parish that subsequently assumed Queen of All Saints' territory, the parish was largely Hispanic. Its building was demolished soon after its closure.
St. Anthony		Lackawanna	1917	2025	Established in 1917 as a personal parish for Italian Catholics in Lackawanna, St. Anthony built its first combination church/school building in 1919. In 1964, a new church was dedicated, which served the parish until its closing. In 1998, Queen of All Saints, a territorial parish, was merged into St. Anthony, with St. Anthony taking on the territorial designation once employed by Queen of Angels, as well as their Spanish masses. In 2025, as part of the Road to Renewal, St. Anthony was merged into Our Lady of the Sacred Heart in Orchard Park and closed.
St. Barbara		Lackawanna	1903	2008	Established in 1903 as a personal parish for 250 Polish families in Lackawanna, St. Barbara's first building, a combination church/school was built two years later. In 1929, an Art Deco church, designed by Joseph E. Fronczak, was built. In 2008, as part of the Journey in Faith and Grace, St. Barbara was merged with St. Hyacinth and St. Michael the Archangel in Lackawanna and Our Lady of Grace in Woodlawn to form Queen of Angels Parish, using only the St. Michael the Archangel site. St. Barbara was closed and, after proposals in which it would replace an orange building sometimes dubbed "the ugliest building in the world" as Lackawanna's city hall, it was demolished in 2011.
St. Hyacinth		Lackawanna	1910	2008	On August 10, 1910, Bishop Charles Colton of Buffalo decreed "This day is officially organized the Parish of St. Hyacinth, Lackawanna, NY, for the use of the Polish people of that city living west of the Lake Shore Railroad tracks. The Rev. Constantine John Sliszewski is hereby appointed rector. Stephen Ryszka and Julius Pastorczyk, trustees." St. Hyacinth continued until 2008 when, as part of the Journey in Faith and Grace, St. Hyacinth was merged with St. Barbara and St. Michael the Archangel in Lackawanna and Our Lady of Grace in Woodlawn to form Queen of Angels Parish, using only the St. Michael the Archangel site. St. Hyacinth was sold to the Community Action Organization of Erie County in 2012, which continues to operate St. Hyacinth Head Start in the former church.
St. Joseph		Le Roy	1907	2012	In 2008, as part of the Journey in Faith and Grace, St. Joseph was merged St. Peter in Le Roy, St. Anthony in Limerock, and St. Michael Church in South Byron to form Our Lady of Mercy Parish. St. Joseph became an oratory of the merged parish and was closed in 2012.
St. Christopher		Lime Lake			Attested to in a 1960 Lime Lake directory.
St. Anthony		Limerock	1907	2008	In 2008, as part of the Journey in Faith and Grace, St. Anthony was merged with Sts Joseph and Peter Churches in Le Roy and St. Michael Church in South Byron to form Our Lady of Mercy Parish. The church was sold in 2008 to a Protestant church.
St. Patrick		Limestone	1867	2014	Fr. George Zurcher was appointed in 1878 to serve as the first resident pastor of St. Patrick, a parish started in 1867. In 1893, a permanent church was built. Missions in Chipmunk and Vandalias were started. In 2014, St. Patrick was merged into Our Lady of Peace in Salamanca and closed. 50 families attended the parish at the time of its closure.
St. Mary		Little Valley	1874	2008	In 1874, a church was built in Little Valley to serve eight Catholic families. Priests came from Cattaraugus, Salamanca, St. Bonaventure, and Randolph to say mass at St. Mary. For most of its history, priests from Cattaraugus served Little Valley. In 2008, as part of the Journey in Faith and Grace, St. Mary was merged into St. Mary, Cattaraugus, and closed.
St. Anthony		Lockport	1928	2008	Created as a response to population growth on the west side of Lockport, St. Anthony's building was completed in less than six months in 1928. St. Anthony was decreed to be merged with Sts. Joseph, Mary and Patrick Churches in Lockport to form All Saints Parish, as part of the Journey in Faith and Grace. The final mass was held in 2008 and the building was sold. It was sold in 2010 to Latter Rain Cathedral, a Church of God in Christ congregation.
St. Mary		Lockport	1859	2011	Situated immediately south of the Erie Canal, St. Mary served a predominantly German population. Finding their first home in a converted Episcopal church, St. Mary was dedicated in 1859 as a personal parish for German Catholics. Their purpose-built church was dedicated in 1886. St. Mary was decreed to be merged with Sts. Anthony, Joseph and Patrick Churches in Lockport to form All Saints Parish, as part of the Journey in Faith and Grace. St. Mary parishioners objected, and the merger was put off until 2011, when St. Mary was merged into All Saints and became an oratory. No further mergers took place, and St. Mary was sold to a Wesleyan congregation in 2016.
St. Joseph		Lyndonville	1962	2023	As part of the Journey in Faith and Grace, merged in 2008 with St. Patrick in Barker to form Our Lady of the Lake Parish, utilizing both sites. St. Joseph burned down in 2023 and was not rebuilt.
Holy Family		Machias	1949	2008	Founded in 1949, Holy Family is referred to as St. Mary in a report on the Rural Missionary Apostolate. It was merged into St. Philomena in Franklinville in 2008 and closed.
Sacred Heart of Jesus		Medina	1962	2008	Established as a personal parish for Polish people living around Medina. Fr. Stanislaus Bubacz celebrated the first mass in 1909. The parish was formed in 1910, and the church was dedicated the same year. As school was operated from 1926 to 1969. As part of the Journey in Faith and Grace, merged with St. Mary in Medina and St. Stephen in Middleport to form Holy Trinity Parish. Sacred Heart was not utilized and closed.
St. Stephen		Middleport	1854	2025	In 2008, as part of the Journey in Faith and Grace, merged with St. Mary in Medina and St. Stephen in Middleport to form Holy Trinity Parish. St. Stephen continued as a worship site of Holy Trinity Parish until 2025, when it was closed as part of the Road to Renewal.
St. Mary of the Immaculate Conception		New Oregon	1858	2006	In the 1850s, the nearest Catholic Church was in East Eden, a distance of over seven miles (11 km). New Oregon Catholics wanted a church nearby and adapted a wood frame building with a dirt floor. The priest from East Eden would minister in this church. The first Mass was celebrated on January 1, 1858, with the parish named Saint Mary of the Immaculate Conception. In 1866, the parish purchased the New Oregon Methodist Church building and made additions. In a 1944 history of the parish, it was noted that "the late Mr. Nicholas Schmitt and many other deceased parishioners, rendered faithful, untiring, noncompensating (sic) assistance in laying the cornerstone and general construction." In the fall of 2006, the parish merged with Saint Martin and Saint Frances Cabrini to form Epiphany of Our Lord Parish in Langford, and the New Oregon Church was closed. In 2007, the buildings were purchased and now operate as the Marienthal Inn./>
Divine Mercy/ St. Stanislaus Kosta		Niagara Falls	1917	2024	In 1917, St. Stanislaus Kosta was established as a personal parish for Polish people living around Niagara and 24th Streets. Mass was said at Our Lady of the Rosary, a territorial parish just one block from where St. Stanislaus Church would be built. The first church building, a combination church/school, served the parish from 1919 to 1966 when a new, modernist building designed by Gerard M. Zimmerman was dedicated. A school was operated from 1917 to 1989. In 2008, as part of the Journey in Faith and Grace, St. Stanislaus was merged with Holy Trinity, Our Lady of Lebanon, Our Lady of the Rosary, and St. George the Martyr at the St. Stanislaus site under the name Divine Mercy. Divine Mercy Parish continued until 2024 when, as part of the Road to Renewal, it was merged into Holy Family of Jesus, Mary and Joseph Parish and closed.
Holy Trinity		Niagara Falls	1902	2007	Located in what was once a thriving immigrant community named "Tunnel Town" among whom Italians and Poles predominated, Holy Trinity was founded in 1901 by a consortium of 21 Polish-American families desirous of a place to celebrate Mass in their native language. Several years of worship in a small temporary church on 12th Street were followed by the construction and dedication of the present-day church in 1906, with convent, parochial school, and other outbuildings following over the next half-dozen years. At its height, Holy Trinity was the second-largest Polish-American parish in the diocese, behind only St. Stanislaus on Buffalo's East Side; a highlight of its history was a 1976 visit by then-Cardinal Karol Wojtyła, later Pope John Paul II, during a tour of Western New York. However, the ensuing decades saw changing neighborhood demographics and urban decline take over the neighborhood, and the parish population diminished accordingly; the school had already closed by the time of Wojtyla's visit. In 2008, as part of the Journey in Faith and Grace, Holy Trinity was merged with Our Lady of Lebanon, Our Lady of the Rosary, St. George, and St. Stanislaus Kosta at the St. Stanislaus site under the name Divine Mercy. The last Mass at Holy Trinity was held on Easter Sunday of 2008. The building was bought by Niagara Heritage of Hope and Service, a non-profit, in 2010 and is operated as an historic site. Holy Trinity was listed on the National Register of Historic Places in 2010.
Our Lady of Lebanon		Niagara Falls	1914	2008	Our Lady of Lebanon was established in 1914 as a Maronite Catholic Church. After the founding priest died, no other Maronite priest could be found to staff it, and the church was absorbed into the Diocese of Buffalo as a personal parish for those of Lebanese descent. In 2008, as part of the Journey in Faith and Grace, Our Lady of Lebanon was merged with Holy Trinity, Our Lady of the Rosary, St. George, and St. Stanislaus Kosta at the St. Stanislaus site under the name Divine Mercy. Our Lady of Lebanon was sold in 2011, with the intended use of a chocolate factory and museum.
Our Lady of Mount Carmel		Niagara Falls	1949	2025	Our Lady of Mount Carmel was established in 1949. The combination church/school building was dedicated the next year. A school was maintained by the parish from 1950 until 2010. In 2008, as part of the Journey in Faith and Grace, Our Lady of Mount Carmel merged with St. Joseph to form Holy Family of Jesus, Mary and Joseph Parish. Both sites were used by the merged parish until 2025 when, as part of the Road to Renewal, Our Lady of Mount Carmel was closed.
Our Lady of the Rosary		Niagara Falls	1906	2007	A territorial parish established in 1906, Our Lady of the Rosary experienced financial difficulties during its final years, and operations were suspended in 2007. In 2008, Our Lady of the Rosary was merged with Holy Trinity, Our Lady of Lebanon, St. George, and St. Stanislaus Kosta at the St. Stanislaus site under the name Divine Mercy. Our Lady of the Rosary was sold in 2010 to Christ Redemption Tabernacle, an African American congregation.
Sacred Heart/ St. Raphael		Niagara Falls	1854	2008	Sacred Heart had its origins as St. William, a mission established in 1854. When the first church was consecrated in 1856, the parish was consecrated as St. Raphael. In 1888, the church burned down and was rebuilt, consecrated as Sacred Heart Church in 1890. A parish school existed from 1860 to 2001. In 2008, as part of the Journey in Faith and Grace, it merged with St. Teresa Church at the St. Teresa site. The merged parish took the name St. Raphael, the original name of Sacred Heart. Sacred Heart Church was alienated and, in 2010, was sold to True Bethel Baptist Church.
St. Ann		Niagara Falls	1935	1936	A short-lived parish for French speaking Catholics, St. Ann used the original home of St. George the Martyr as its church for its entire existence.
St. Charles Borromeo		Niagara Falls	1943	2008	Founded in 1943 as a mission of Prince of Peace, St. Charles became an independent parish in 1970. Never large, it was merged into St. John de LaSalle in 2008, as part of the Journey in Faith and Grace and closed. The former church was owned by St. John de LaSalle until 2021, when it was sold to a Muslim group, who converted it into Masjid Al Ibrahim.
St. George the Martyr		Niagara Falls	1915	2008	In 1902, the St. George Benevolent Society was established by Lithuanian immigrants, with the intent of forming a church in Niagara Falls. The first church, a small frame building, was built in 1917, and was later used for the French-speaking St. Ann Parish. The second church, a brick building designed by Henry G. Mess, was built in 1927. Throughout its history, St. George was always staffed by religious order priests and existed as a personal parish for people of Lithuanian descent. In 2008, as part of the Journey in Faith and Grace, St. George was merged with Holy Trinity, Our Lady of Lebanon, Our Lady of the Rosary, and St. Stanislaus Kosta at the St. Stanislaus site under the name Divine Mercy. St. George was sold in 2010 to the Independent Anglican Church Canada Synod, which operates it as St. George Cathedral.
St. Raphael/St. Teresa of the Infant Jesus		Niagara Falls	1930	2025	In 1930, St. Teresa was founded in the DeVeaux neighborhood of Niagara Falls. The first church was built in 1931, and the second in 1967. In 2008, as part of the Journey in Faith and Grace, it merged with Sacred Heart Church and took the name of St. Raphael, the original name of Sacred Heart. In 2025, as part of the Road to Renewal, St. Raphael was merged into St. Peter Parish in Lewiston and closed.
Holy Spirit		North Collins	1952	2025	Holy Spirit was formed in 1952 as the merger of St. John the Baptist and Sacred Heart Parishes, both in North Collins. The site of Sacred Heart was initially used. In 1958, a new church and school was opened at a different location within North Collins. In 2025, as part of the Road to Renewal, Holy Spirit was merged into Immaculate Conception Church in Eden and closed.
Sacred Heart of Jesus		North Collins	1907	1958	Founded in 1907 as a church for Italian Catholics, Sacred Heart was incorporated as a parish in 1918. In 1952, Sacred Heart merged with St. John the Baptist to form Holy Spirit Parish. From 1956 to 1958, Sacred Heart was the sole church for Holy Spirit Parish. It closed in 1958 with the opening of the new building. Sacred Heart of Jesus is unrelated to the current Sacred Heart of Mary Church in North Collins, which is an independent Anglo-Catholic church unaffiliated with any denomination.
St. John the Baptist		North Collins	1902	1956	St. John the Baptist was established for English-speaking Catholics living around North Collins. A church was completed in 1904. In 1952, St. John merged with Sacred Heart to form Holy Spirit Parish. St. John was used as a church in the merged parish until it was closed in 1956.
St. Vincent de Paul		North Evans	1853	2011	The earliest antecedents to St. Vincent were founded in 1853, when a church was built in North Evans. Served by visiting priests for over 60 years, St. Vincent was established as an independent parish in 1914, and Fr. George Zucher was appointed as the first resident pastor. The 1853 building burned down in 1931, and brick church was built the next year. A school was operated from 1946 to 1983. In 1968, a new, larger church was built. In 2011, as part of the Journey in Faith and Grace, St. Vincent de Paul was merged with Our Lady of Perpetual Help Church in Lake View to form Blessed John Paul II Parish (Later St. John Paul II), using only the Our Lady of Perpetual Help site. St. Vincent was sold, and is now used as a Wesleyan Church.
St. Nicholas		North Java	1890	2008	In 2008, as part of the Journey in Faith and Grace, St. Nicholas was merged with St. Patrick in Java Center, St. Cecilia in Sheldon, and St. Mary of the Rosary in Strykersville to form St. John Neumann Parish. St. Nicholas was not utilized by the merged parish, closed, and sold in 2011. It has reopened as St. Nicholas Parish, of the Polish National Catholic Church.
Ascension		North Tonawanda	1887	2008	In 2008, as part of the Journey in Faith and Grace, Ascension merged with St. Albert the Great to form St. Jude the Apostle, using only the St. Albert site. Ascension was closed and sold.
St. Joseph		North Tonawanda	1947	2008	Tracing its history to June 1947, St. Joseph grew as the Tonawandas grew. A predominantly Polish parish, the building seen here, which operated as a combined church/school, was completed in 1948. In 1966, a second, purpose built church, was completed. A school operated from 1948 to 1990 and in 2008, as part of the Journey in Faith and Grace, St. Joseph was merged into Our Lady of Czestochowa in North Tonawanda. St. Joseph was closed and sold off in pieces; the school to Redeemed Christian Church of God, a Nigerian Pentecostal congregation, and the church to Payne Avenue Christian Church, a Christian Church (Disciples of Christ) congregation.
St. Jude the Apostle/ St. Albert the Great		North Tonawanda	1967	2025	In 2008, as part of the Journey in Faith and Grace, St. Albert the Great merged with Ascension Church in North Tonawanda to form St. Jude the Apostle, using only the St. Albert site. In 2025, as part of the Road to Renewal, St. Jude the Apostle was merged into St. Christopher Parish in Tonawanda and held its last mass in 2025.
Transfiguration		Olean	1947	2009	In 1902, under the leadership of Fr. Ladislaus Hordych, Transfiguration was established as a Polish personal parish in Olean. In 2009, as part of the Journey in Faith and Grace, Transfiguration was merged into St. John the Evangelist in Olean and closed. In 2011, it was occupied by St. Joseph Maronite Catholic Church, after its building burned down, leaving it as the only former Latin Rite building in the Diocese of Buffalo to still be used by a church in communion with Rome.
Our Lady of the Snows		Panama	1946	2025	Established in 1946 as part of the Rural Missionary Apostolate, Our Lady of the Snows was known as St. Rose of Lima for the first two months of its existence. In November of that year, a home was purchased and remodeled into a chapel. In 1948, Our Lady of the Snows became an independent parish. A purpose-built church was dedicated in 1956. In 2008, as part of the Journey in Faith and Grace, Our Lady of the Snows was merged into Sacred Heart Parish in Lakewood and retained as a site for regular worship. In 2025, as part of the Road to Renewal, Our Lady of the Snows was closed.
St. Joseph		Perry	1879	2024	In 2008, as part of the Journey in Faith and Grace, St. Joseph was merged with St. Joseph in Bliss, St. Stanislaus in Perry, Assumption in Portageville and St. Mary in Silver Springs to form St. Isidore Parish. St. Joseph was used as one of two churches for the merged parish. In 2024, as part of the Road to Renewal, St. Isidore was merged into St. Michael Parish in Warsaw and St. Joseph was closed.
St. Stanislaus Kosta		Perry	1910	2008	St. Stanislaus was established in 1910 as a personal parish to serve a growing Polish community in Perry. Fr. Joseph Rudzinski said the first mass in a rented building on Water Street. In 1912, a permanent church was built, which served the parish for the rest of its existence. In 2008, as part of the Journey in Faith and Grace, St. Stanislaus was merged with St. Joseph in Bliss, St. Joseph in Perry, Assumption in Portageville and St. Mary in Silver Springs to form St. Isidore Parish. St. Stanislaus was no longer used was closed and sold to a Spanish speaking Protestant church.
St. Joan of Arc		Perrysburg	1950	2007	St. Joan of Arc was established in 1950 as part of the Missionary Apostolate. By 1991, it was noted that there were only about 35 families registered in the parish. In 2007, as part of the Journey in Faith and Grace, St. Joan of Arc was merged into St. Joseph Parish in Gowanda and closed. The building was sold for use as a private residence.
Assumption		Portageville	1847	2008	In 2008, as part of the Journey in Faith and Grace, Assumption was merged with St. Joseph in Bliss, St. Joseph in Perry, St. Stanislaus in Perry, and St. Mary in Silver Springs to form St. Isidore Parish. Assumption was not utilized by the merged parish, closed, and sold in 2008 to serve as an inn and banquet hall.
St. Thomas More		Ripley	1941	2008	In 2008, as part of the Journey in Faith and Grace, St. Thomas More was merged with St. Patrick in Brocton and St. James Major in Westfield to form St. Dominic Parish. St. Thomas More was not utilized by the merged parish, closed, and sold to a Menonite congregation.
St. Mark		Rushford	1948	2024	In 2012, after the retirement of Fr. Francis Jann, St. Mark was merged into St. Patrick in Belfast and maintained as a summer oratory. In 2024, as part of the Road to Renewal, St. Mark was closed.
St. Patrick/ St. John/ St. Joseph		Salamanca	1862	2007	Built in 1882, St. Patrick Church was the third church to serve the parish. The first, St. Joseph, a 32x50 foot frame structure, was built in 1862. The second, St. John, measured 34x72 feet. In 1882, the parish having substantially grown, St. Patrick Church was built. A mission was briefly operated in Killbuck. In 2007, as part of the Journey in Faith and Grace, St. Patrick was merged with Holy Cross in Salamanca to form Our Lady of Peace. St. Patrick was closed and sold.
St. Jude		Sardinia	1953	2024	Established as part of the Buffalo Missionary Apostolate, St. Jude Church held its first mass on December 6, 1953 in its purpose-built church. It hosted resident pastors starting in 1970. In 2024, as part of the Road to Renewal, St. Jude was merged into St. Mary Parish in Arcade, and the building sold to Seventh-day Adventists for $256,000.
St. Mary		Sardinia	1869	1885	This small church stood at the corner of Pratham and Cottrell (now Foote) Roads in the former community of Pratham, home to several Irish Catholic families. Father Ulrich from St. Aloysius in Springville supervised construction. He, along with Father Thies from Boston, and later a priest from Springbrook, celebrated mass monthly. Difficult to reach, St. Mary closed by 1886 after the opening of St. Joseph in Holland. The building, which still exists today, was sold, moved to Glenwood, and converted into a tavern.
St. Joseph		Scio	1843	2025	The oldest Catholic parish in Allegany County, St. Joseph boasted three churches; one built in 1846, the second built in 1878 (burned in 1904) and the third built in 1906. Throughout its history, St. Joseph never had a resident pastor. In 2007, as part of the Journey in Faith and Grace, St. Joseph was merged with Sacred Heart in Angelica and St. Mary in Belmont into Holy Family of Jesus, Mary and Joseph Parish. The St. Joseph site was retained for worship until 2025 when, as part of the Road to Renewal, it was closed.
St. John Bosco		Sheridan	1946	2008	A chapel was built in Sheridan in 1946, as a mission of the Rural Missionary Apostolate. In 1949, St. John Bosco became an independent parish. In 2008, as part of the Journey in Faith and Grace, St. John Bosco was merged into Our Lady of Mount Carmel in Silver Creek and closed. The building was purchased by the Town of Sheridan for use as a town courthouse.
St. Isaac Jogues		Sherman	1946	2025	In 2008, as part of the Journey in Faith and Grace, St. Isaac Jogues was merged with St. Matthias in French Creek to form Christ our Hope Parish. St. Isaac Jogues was retained for regular worship until 2025 when, as part of the Road to Renewal, it was closed.
St. Mary		Silver Springs	1892	2024	In 2008, as part of the Journey in Faith and Grace, St. Mary was merged with St. Joseph in Bliss, St. Joseph in Perry, St. Stanislaus in Perry and Assumption in Portageville to form St. Isidore Parish. St. Mary was used as one of two churches for the merged parish. In 2024, as part of the Road to Renewal, St. Isidore was merged into St. Michael Parish in Warsaw and St. Mary was closed.
St. John the Evangelist		Sinclairville	1948	2007	Established as part of the Rural Missionary Apostolate, St. John was never large. Indeed in 2005, on the eve of the Journey in Faith and Grace, Sunday masses were cancelled and parishoners petitioned Bishop Edward Kmiec to close the parish after some masses were attended by only one person. In 2007, St. John the Evangelist was merged into St. Anthony Parish in Fredonia and closed.
St. Michael		South Byron	1892	2008	In 2008, as part of the Journey in Faith and Grace, St. Michael was merged with Sts Joseph and Peter Churches in Le Roy and St. Anthony Church in Limerock to form Our Lady of Mercy Parish. The buildings and property of St. Michael were sold in 2011 and are now a private residence.
St. John Fisher		South Dayton	1940	2008	Already in 1991, St. John Fisher, which counted 65 families in its parish, was sharing a pastor with St. Elizabeth in Cherry Creek and St. Joan of Arc in Perrysburg. In 2008, as part of the Road to Renewal, St. John Fisher was merged into St. Joseph Parish in Gowanda and closed.
St. Mary, Queen of the Rosary		Strykersville	1885	2024	St. Mary was founded by German settlers in Wyoming County. The parish church was erected in 1886. In 2008, as part of the Journey in Faith and Grace, St. Mary was merged with St. Patrick in Java Center, St. Nicholas in North Java, and St. Cecilia in Sheldon to form St. John Neumann Parish. St. Mary was used as one of two churches for the merged parish. In 2024, as part of the Road to Renewal, St. Mary was closed.
St. Andrew		Tonawanda	1944	2024	St. Andrew was founded in 1944 with the Rev. James F. Donovan, formerly of St. Anthony's in rural Farnham, holding the first Mass in the chapel of nearby Mount St. Mary's Academy for a flock of 400 faithful largely hailing from the WWII-era Sheridan Parkside public housing development. Construction of a dedicated building, which normally would have begun more or less immediately, had to be postponed due to wartime construction materials rationing, so the flock continued worshipping in temporary locations (first Mount St. Mary's, then the Sheridan Parkside Administration Building) until 1949, when their first home, a combination church and school building facing Sheridan Drive just to the east of the present church, was completed. It became clear almost immediately, in the wake of a parish population whose sustained exponential growth came first from the return of overseas GIs and later through the postwar baby boom, that a larger building would soon be necessary; hence the current structure, whose construction began in 1960. Completed in 1962, the church served the parish until 2024 when, as part of the Road to Renewal, St. Andrew was merged into St. Timothy Parish and closed.
St. Edmund		Tonawanda	1965	2007	In 2007, as part of the Journey in Faith and Grace, St. Edmund was merged into St. Christopher in Tonawanda and closed. The merger was met with a positive reception by the parishoners. The combination church/school is still owned by St. Christopher and is used as a community center.
St. John the Baptist		Vandalia	1900	2011	St. John the Baptist was established as a mission of St. Patrick in Limestone. In 2007, as part of the Journey in Faith and Grace, St. John the Baptist was merged into St. Bonaventure Parish in Olean. Four years later, St. John was closed.
St. Elizabeth		Wanakah	1928	1939	This short lived mission church of Our Lady of Perpetual Help in Lake View was presumably merged into the nearby St. Mary of the Lake Parish.
St. Bonaventure		West Seneca	1917	2008	In 2008, as part of the Journey in Faith and Grace, St. Bonaventure was merged with St. William in West Seneca, to form Blessed John XXIII Parish. Only the St. William site was used, and St. Bonaventure was closed. The building now houses THE WELL, an evangelical congregation.
St. Catherine of Siena		West Seneca	1967	2008	Founded in 1967 to ease overcrowding at nearby Queen of Heaven, St. Catherine was merged back into Queen of Heaven in 2008, as part of the Journey in Faith and Grace. The building now houses Life Church, and Evangelical congregation.
St. John the Baptist		West Valley	1883	2025	Established in 1883 as a mission of St. Aloysius in Springville, St. John the Baptist's church was completed in 1885. A school was operated from 1906 to 1960. In 2025, as part of the Road to Renewal, St. John the Baptist was merged into St. Mary Parish in Arcade and closed.
St. Michael the Archangel		Weston Mills	1916	1983	This mission church was merged into Sacred Heart Parish in Portville in 1983
St. Patrick		Wheatville	1885	2008	In 2008, as part of the Journey in Faith and Grace, St. Patrick was merged into St. Cecilia Parish in Oakfield. The building reopened in 2013 as a gift shop.
St. John of the Cross		Whitesville	1949	2007	Established as a parish of the Rural Missionary Apostolate in 1949. In 2007, as part of the Journey in Faith in Grace, St. John of the Cross was merged into Blessed Sacrament Parish in Andover. St. John was closed, sold, and is now an historical museum.
Our Lady of Grace		Woodlawn	1940	2008	In 2008, as part of the Journey in Faith and Grace, Our Lady of Grace was merged with St. Barbara, St. Hyacinth and St. Michael the Archangel in Lackawanna to form Queen of Angels Parish, using only the St. Michael the Archangel site. As all three Lackawanna parishes were Polish personal parishes, Queen of Angels became a both a Polish personal parish and a territorial parish, assuming Our Lady of Grace's territory while being physically outside Our Lady of Grace's parochial boundaries. 2025's merger of Queen of Angels into Our Lady of the Sacred Heart in Orchard Park corrected this anomaly. The building now houses Holy Trinity, a parish of the Polish National Catholic Church.

== Eastern Rite Churches ==
=== Current Churches ===
The Buffalo Diocese is home to a number of Eastern Rite churches. The list here is sourced from the Catholic Directory.

Name	Image	Location	Founded	Rite	Description/Notes
St. Nicholas		Buffalo	1894	Ukrainian	St. Nicholas is a parish of the Ukrainian Catholic Eparchy of Stamford. The church seen here was completed in 1920 after three years of construction.
St. John the Baptist		Kenmore	1902	Ukrainian	St. John the Baptist is a parish of the Ukrainian Catholic Eparchy of Stamford. The church seen here was erected in 1920 after three years of construction.
Our Lady of Perpetual Help formerly Holy Ghost		Lackawanna	1902	Ukrainian	Our Lady of Perpetual Help is a parish of the Ukrainian Catholic Eparchy of Stamford. Founded in 1926 and originally called Holy Ghost Ukrainian Greek Catholic Church, the parish's first church was located on Wilkesbarre Street in Lackawanna's First Ward and served a Ukrainian-American community which at the time mostly consisted of employees of the nearby steel plant and the families thereof. The growth of the flock was such that, by the 1960s, Holy Ghost's head pastor Rev. Bohdan Ostapowycz saw fit to purchase a parcel of vacant land in the more suburban eastern outskirts of Lackawanna where a larger church could eventually be built. His successor, Rev. Ihor Pelensky, brought these plans to fruition, establishing a building fund in the late 1960s. The cornerstone-laying ceremony in 1971 coincided with the unveiling of the parish's new and current name. Our Lady of Perpetual Help is today one of four Buffalo-area member parishes of the Ukrainian Catholic Eparchy of Stamford.
St. Basil		Lancaster	1927	Ukrainian	St. Basil is a parish of the Ukrainian Catholic Eparchy of Stamford.
St. Joseph		Olean	1919	Maronite	St. Joseph is a parish of the Maronite Catholic Eparchy of Saint Maron of Brooklyn. Since a 2011 fire destroyed their original church, St. Joseph has used the former Transfiguration Latin Rite church as their parish church.
St. Mary		Olean	1927	Byzantine	St. Mary is a parish of the Ruthenian Catholic Eparchy of Passaic.
St. John Maron		Williamsville	1904	Maronite	St. John Maron is a parish of the Maronite Catholic Eparchy of Saint Maron of Brooklyn.

=== Closed Churches ===
Name	Image	Location	Founded	Closed	Rite	Description/Notes
Saint Stephen the Protomartyr		Amherst	1967	2008	Byzantine	A former parish of the Ruthenian Catholic Eparchy of Passaic.
Protection of Virgin Mary		Niagara Falls	1921	c 2020s	Ukrainian	Listed in the Buffalo Catholic Directory as active, but not listed as a parish of the Ukrainian Catholic Eparchy of Stamford.
