= New York State Route 446 =

State highway in the Southern Tier of New York, U.S.

New York State Route 446
- Map of Allegany and Cattaraugus counties with NY 446 highlighted in red

Route information
- Maintained by NYSDOT
- Length: 6.76 mi (10.88 km)
- Existed: July 1, 1974–present

Major junctions
- West end: NY 16 in Hinsdale
- East end: NY 305 in Cuba

Location
- Country: United States
- State: New York
- Counties: Cattaraugus, Allegany

Highway system
- New York Highways; Interstate; US; State; Reference; Parkways
← NY 444	→ NY 448

New York State Route 446 (NY 446) is a state highway in the Southern Tier of New York in the United States. The highway extends for 6.76 miles (10.88 km) on a northeast–southwest alignment from an intersection with NY 16 north of the hamlet of Hinsdale to a junction with NY 305 in the village of Cuba. It parallels the Southern Tier Expressway (NY 17 and Interstate 86 or I-86) very closely for its entire length. NY 446 was originally designated as part of Route 4, an unsigned legislative route, in 1908. The Hinsdale–Cuba highway received its first posted designation in 1924 when it was included as part of NY 17. It was renumbered twice, becoming part of NY 63 in 1930 and NY 408 in the 1940s, before gaining its current designation on July 1, 1974.

== Route description ==
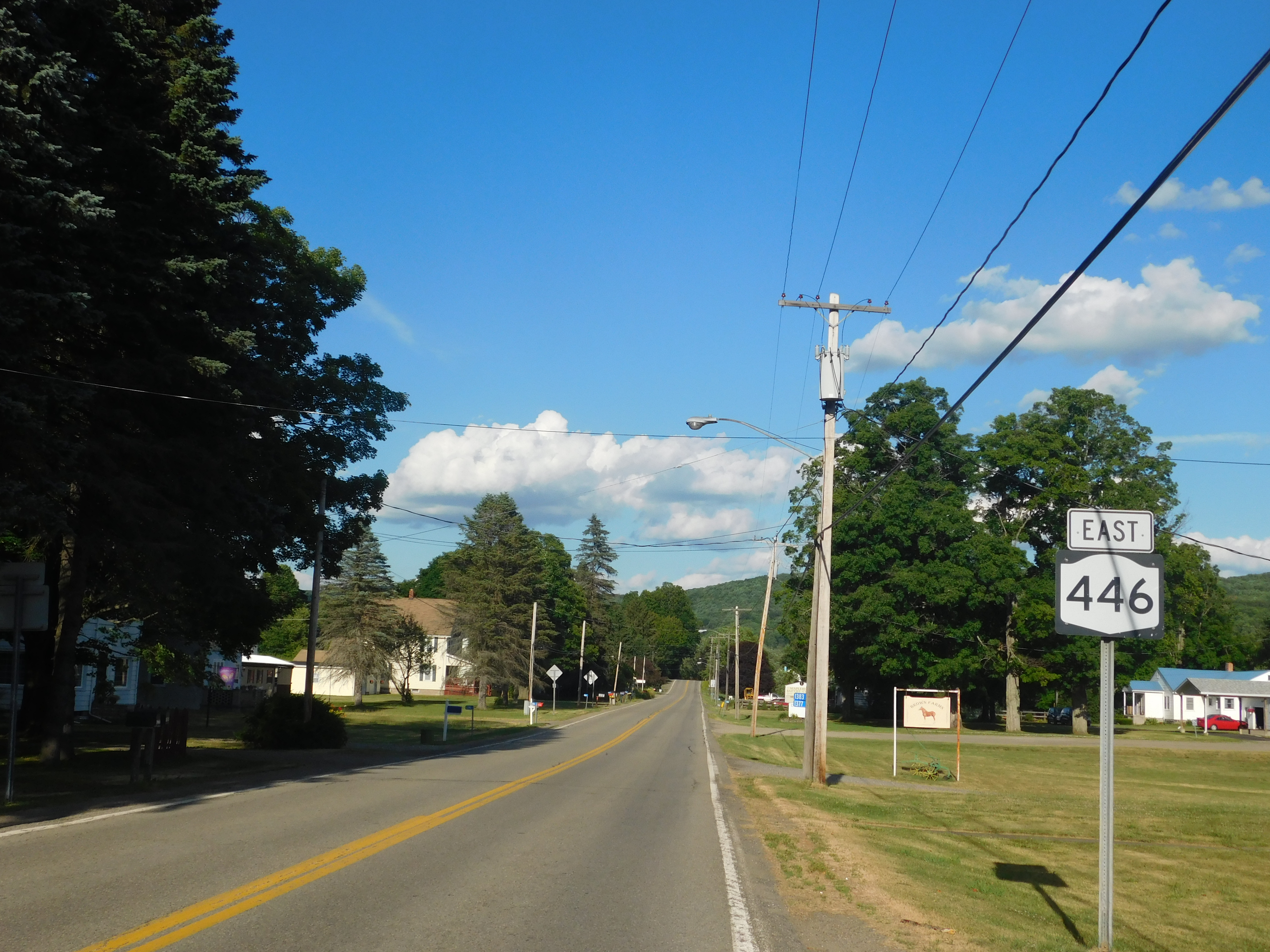
NY 446 heading east from NY 16 in Maplehurst

NY 446 begins at an intersection with NY 16 in the Hinsdale hamlet of Maplehurst, located a quarter-mile (0.40 km) north of exit 27 on the Southern Tier Expressway (I-86 and NY 17) and roughly one mile (1.6 km) north of the larger community of Hinsdale. The route heads northeast through the town of Hinsdale along the base of a valley surrounding Oil Creek. While NY 446 follows the north bank of the creek, the Southern Tier Expressway and the adjacent Western New York and Pennsylvania Railroad (WNYP) run along the southern bank.

Near the Cattaraugus–Allegany county line, Route 446, Oil Creek, and the WNYP all turn east toward Cuba; however, the expressway continues on a northeasterly alignment to bypass the village to the north. Upon entering Allegany County, NY 446 passes under the Southern Tier Expressway and becomes known as Water Street as it enters Cuba from the west upon traversing Oil Creek. The route continues eastward for three blocks to NY 305 (Genesee Street), where both Water Street and NY 446 terminate approximately a quarter-mile (0.40 km) south of exit 28 on the Southern Tier Expressway.

== History ==
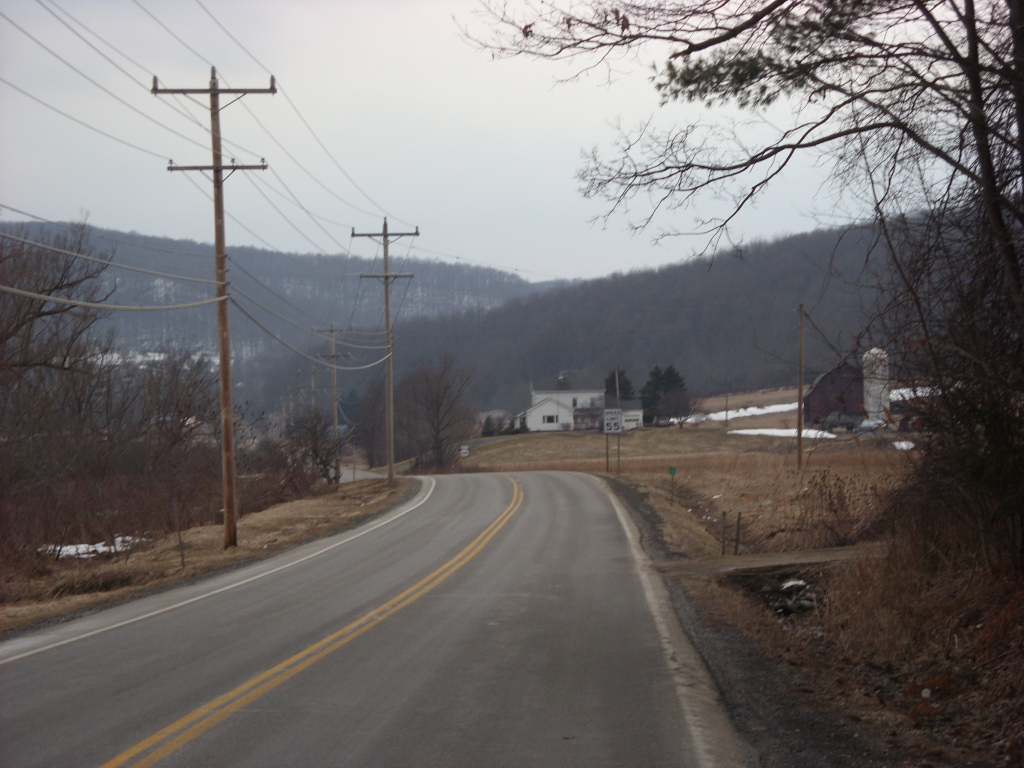
NY 446 westbound in Hinsdale

All of modern NY 446 was originally designated as part of Route 4, a cross-state unsigned legislative route defined by the New York State Legislature in 1908. Route 4 continued south from Hinsdale on what is now NY 16 and east from the village of Cuba on County Route 20. The legislative route system was replaced by the modern state route system in 1924, at which time most of Route 4 was designated NY 17, including from Hinsdale to Cuba. In the 1930 renumbering of state highways in New York, NY 17 was moved onto a more southerly alignment (now NY 417) between Olean and Wellsville. Its former routing between Hinsdale and the Amity hamlet of Belvidere became the southwesternmost part of the new NY 63, which continued north from Belvidere to the Lake Ontario shoreline.

NY 63 was rerouted south of Mount Morris in the early 1940s to follow its current alignment to Wayland. The former alignment of NY 63 from Hinsdale to Mount Morris was redesignated as NY 408. In the early 1970s, construction began on the portion of the Southern Tier Expressway between Olean and Corning. From Hinsdale to Belvidere, the new highway closely followed NY 408. By 1974, the highway was open from Olean to Hinsdale and from Almond to Corning. The segment between Hinsdale and NY 19 in Belvidere was completed by January 1975, and the leg between Belvidere and Almond opened to traffic on January 30, 1975, completing the Olean–Corning portion of the expressway. The bypassed section of NY 408 between Cuba and Belvidere was subsequently transferred to Allegany County, and NY 408 was truncated to its current southern terminus in Nunda as a result. The portion of NY 408's former routing between Hinsdale and Cuba was retained as a state highway and renumbered to NY 446 on July 1, 1974.

== Major intersections ==
County	Location	mi	km	Destinations	Notes
Cattaraugus	Hinsdale	0.00	0.00	NY 16 – Olean, Franklinville	Western terminus; hamlet of Maplehurst
Allegany	Village of Cuba	6.76	10.88	NY 305 (Genesee Street) to I-86 – Belfast, Portville	Eastern terminus
1.000 mi = 1.609 km; 1.000 km = 0.621 mi
