= Portville, New York (disambiguation) =

Portville, New York is a village and a town in Cattaraugus County, New York.

- Portville (village), New York
- Portville (town), New York
