= Hannacroix Ravine Preserve =

New York wildlife preserve

- Hannacroix Ravine
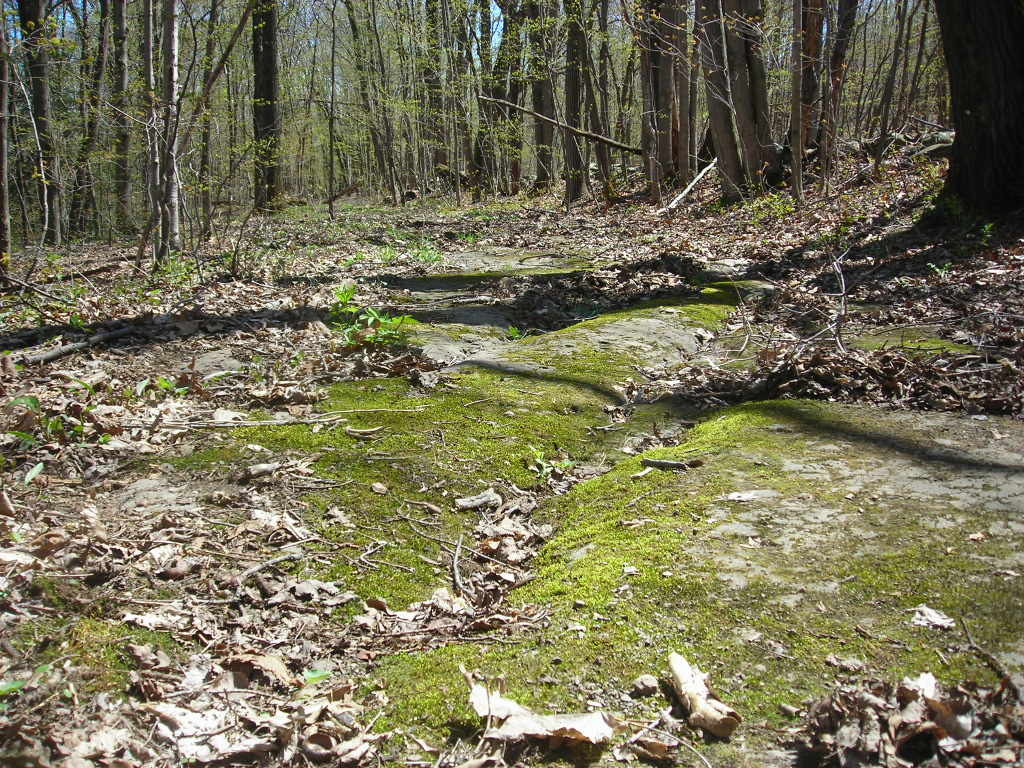

- Location within New York
- Nearest city: Clarksville
- Coordinates: 42.57511°N 74.00122°W
- Area: 415 acres (168 ha)
- Governing body: The Nature Conservancy
- Website: nature.org/en-us/get-involved/how-to-help/places-we-protect/eny-hannacroix-ravine/

The Hannacroix Ravine Preserve is a 415-acre (168 ha) preserve near Clarksville New York that is home to a 30-foot-tall (9.1 m) cascade called Sliding Rock Falls. The creek leading to the cascade is home to a number of 100-year-old hemlocks trees. The preserve is administered by The Nature Conservancy.

== Wildlife ==
There is a very diverse quantity of birds that are found in Hannacroix Ravine Preserve including the boreal breeding warblers, the winter wren (Troglodytes hiemalis), and several species of finches.
