= Weston Mills, New York =

Westons Mills, New York Weston Mills CDP
- Hamlet
- Location within New York Location within the United States
- Coordinates: 42°4′13″N 78°22′44″W
- Country: United States
- State: New York
- County: Cattaraugus
- Towns: Portville, Olean

Area
  - Total: 7.12 sq mi (18.45 km^{2})
  - Land: 7.05 sq mi (18.26 km^{2})
  - Water: 0.073 sq mi (0.19 km^{2})
- Elevation: 1,463 ft (446 m)

Population (2020)
  - Total: 1,525
  - Density: 216.4/sq mi (83.54/km^{2})
- Time zone: UTC-5 (Eastern (EST))
  - Summer (DST): UTC-4 (EDT)
- ZIP Codes: 14788 (Westons Mills); 14760 (Olean); 14770 (Portville)
- Area code: 716
- FIPS code: 36-80632
- GNIS feature ID: 970939

Weston Mills (variant names Westons Mills and Weston’s Mills) is a hamlet in the towns of Portville and Olean in Cattaraugus County, New York, United States. It is counted as a census-designated place by the U.S. Census Bureau. As of the 2020 census, Weston Mills had a population of 1,525.

== History ==
Weston Mills was founded by the Weston family, three brothers who set up the titular mill in the community. The original Weston family homestead is now owned by the government, which operates it as a group home.

According to county administrator Jack Searles, the name was likely either Weston's Mills or Westons Mills at first (the 1869 Beers Atlas uses the name "Westonville" for the location), then changed to Weston Mills at the behest of President Benjamin Harrison, who sought to standardize post-office names by removing unnecessary possessive forms (see United States Board on Geographic Names). The "s" was slowly, and colloquially, restored over the course of the 1960s, after a retail store opened using the "Weston's" name.

== Geography ==
Westons Mills is located at 42°4′13″N 78°22′44″W (42.070296, -78.379012). It is primarily in the town of Portville, but extends west into the town of Olean as far as the limits of the city of Olean. New York State Route 417 passes through the community, leading west 2 miles (3 km) into the center of Olean and southeast 3 miles (5 km) to the village of Portville.

According to the United States Census Bureau, the CDP has a total area of 6.8 square miles (17.5 km^{2}), of which 6.7 square miles (17.3 km^{2}) is land and 0.08 square miles (0.2 km^{2}), or 1.09%, is water.

The community is on the north side of the Allegheny River.

== Demographics ==
Historical population
Census	Pop.	Note	%±
2020	1,525		—
U.S. Decennial Census

As of the census of 2000, there were 1,608 people, 654 households, and 453 families residing in the region. The population density was 241.5 inhabitants per square mile (93.2/km^{2}). There were 694 housing units at an average density of 104.2 per square mile (40.2/km^{2}). The racial makeup of the CDP was 97.76% White, 0.81% African American, 0.19% Native American, 0.19% Asian, 0.06% Pacific Islander, 0.06% from other races, and 0.93% from two or more races. Hispanic or Latino of any race were 0.68% of the population.

There were 654 households, out of which 30.7% had children under the age of 18 living with them, 57.2% were married couples living together, 8.7% had a female householder with no husband present, and 30.6% were non-families. 24.6% of all households were made up of individuals, and 10.1% had someone living alone who was 65 years of age or older. The average household size was 2.46 and the average family size was 2.94.

In the locale the population was spread out, with 23.7% under the age of 18, 6.5% from 18 to 24, 27.5% from 25 to 44, 25.9% from 45 to 64, and 16.4% who were 65 years of age or older. The median age was 40 years. For every 100 females, there were 100.0 males. For every 100 females age 18 and over, there were 95.7 males.

The median income for a household in the community was $34,706, and the median income for a family was $40,978. Males had a median income of $37,688 versus $25,000 for females. The per capita income for the CDP was $19,564. About 4.2% of families and 5.1% of the population were below the poverty line, including 7.8% of those under age 18 and 1.8% of those age 65 or over.
