= Olean (town), New York =

Olean, New York
- Town
- Location within the state of New York
- Coordinates: 42°4′8″N 78°24′54″W
- Country: United States
- State: New York
- County: Cattaraugus

Government
  - Type: Town Council
  - Town Supervisor: Ted E. Hewitt (R)
  - Town Council: Members' List: • John R. Artlip (R); • Leo J. Nenno (D); • Joshua M. Torrey (R); • Patrick W. Zink (R)

Area
  - Total: 29.7 sq mi (77.0 km^{2})
  - Land: 29.6 sq mi (76.7 km^{2})
  - Water: 0.12 sq mi (0.3 km^{2})
- Elevation: 1,840 ft (560 m)

Population (2022)
  - Total: 1,863 (estimate)
- Time zone: UTC-5 (Eastern (EST))
  - Summer (DST): UTC-4 (EDT)
- ZIP code: 14760
- Area codes: 716, 585
- FIPS code: 36-54727
- GNIS feature ID: 0979306
- Website: townofolean.org

Olean (/ˈoʊliæn/ OH-lee-ann) is a town in Cattaraugus County, New York, United States. The name is derived from the Latin word "oleum" due to the discovery of crude oil in nearby Ischua.

The town of Olean is in the southeast corner of the county. The city of Olean, originally the village of Olean, is bordered by the town on three sides.

== History ==
The area of Olean was first settled circa 1805. The town of Olean was established in 1808 from Batavia as the first town in the county. The northern part of the county was spun off as the town of Hebe in 1812; the western part became the town of Perry (later Perrysburg) in 1814, Great Valley was formed in 1818, Hinsdale in 1820, and Portville in 1837.

The village of Olean was originally named "Hamilton", after Alexander Hamilton. The United States Postal Service imposed the name Olean in 1817 to prevent confusion with Hamilton, Madison County, New York; no municipal law was ever passed changing the name. The name "Olean" was suggested for the area due to the oil found in the vicinity. The famed Wenro Oil Spring, discovered by the Franciscan missionary Joseph de La Roche Daillon in 1627, was located approximately 14 miles (23 km) upstream (northeast) of Olean Point. The original town hall burned in 1884, prompting a law that forbade wooden structures in parts of the town.

Notable inhabitants of the town have included Claude Allen, an Olympic athlete, and Catharine Young, a New York state senator.

== Geography ==
According to the United States Census Bureau, the town has a total area of 29.7 square miles (77.0 km^{2}), of which 29.6 square miles (76.7 km^{2}) is land and 0.12 square miles (0.3 km^{2}), or 0.43%, is water.

The Allegheny River flows west through the town. The south town line is the border of Pennsylvania. The Southern Tier Expressway (Interstate 86 and New York State Route 17), New York State Route 16, and New York State Route 417 pass through the town.

=== Adjacent towns and areas ===
(Clockwise)

- Hinsdale
- Portville
- Eldred Township, McKean County, Pennsylvania
- Allegany

== Demographics ==
Historical population
| Census | Pop. | Note | %± |
|---|---|---|---|
| 1820 | 1,047 | | — |
| 1830 | 561 | | −46.4% |
| 1840 | 638 | | 13.7% |
| 1850 | 899 | | 40.9% |
| 1860 | 2,706 | | 201.0% |
| 1870 | 2,668 | | −1.4% |
| 1880 | 6,575 | | 146.4% |
| 1890 | 4,149 | | −36.9% |
| 1900 | 4,854 | | 17.0% |
| 1910 | 885 | | −81.8% |
| 1920 | 1,316 | | 48.7% |
| 1930 | 1,162 | | −11.7% |
| 1940 | 1,432 | | 23.2% |
| 1950 | 1,800 | | 25.7% |
| 1960 | 2,268 | | 26.0% |
| 1970 | 2,211 | | −2.5% |
| 1980 | 2,130 | | −3.7% |
| 1990 | 1,999 | | −6.2% |
| 2000 | 2,029 | | 1.5% |
| 2010 | 1,963 | | −3.3% |
| 2020 | 1,890 | | −3.7% |
| 2021 (est.) | 1,873 | | −0.9% |
U.S. Decennial Census

As of the census of 2000, there were 2,029 people, 827 households, and 564 families residing in the town. The population density was 68.5 inhabitants per square mile (26.4/km^{2}). There were 891 housing units at an average density of 30.1 per square mile (11.6/km^{2}). The racial makeup of the town was 97.88% White, 0.34% Black or African American, 0.15% Native American, 0.79% Asian, and 0.84% from two or more races. Hispanic or Latino of any race were 0.34% of the population.

There were 827 households, out of which 29.6% had children under the age of 18 living with them, 56.5% were married couples living together, 8.3% had a female householder with no husband present, and 31.7% were non-families. 25.9% of all households were made up of individuals, and 11.5% had someone living alone who was 65 years of age or older. The average household size was 2.45 and the average family size was 2.95.

In the town, the population was spread out, with 24.2% under the age of 18, 6.4% from 18 to 24, 27.1% from 25 to 44, 26.9% from 45 to 64, and 15.3% who were 65 years of age or older. The median age was 40 years. For every 100 females, there were 99.5 males. For every 100 females age 18 and over, there were 98.8 males.

The median income for a household in the town was $36,288, and the median income for a family was $47,232. Males had a median income of $35,947 versus $23,641 for females. The per capita income for the town was $19,265. About 7.1% of families and 10.2% of the population were below the poverty line, including 13.6% of those under age 18 and 6.1% of those age 65 or over.

== Communities and locations in the Town of Olean ==
- Baldwin Heights – A district in northern Olean.
- Barnum – A hamlet by the south town line on County Road 29.
- Four Mile – A community at the west town line, located on NY-16.
- Haydenville – A hamlet on the eastern town line on County Road 92.
- Mount Herman – A steep hill on the south side of the river, formerly the area's first ski resort.
- Weston Mills – A hamlet primarily located in Portville that extends into Olean
