= New York State Route 94 (disambiguation) =

New York State Route 94 is an east–west state highway in Orange County, New York, United States, that was established in the late 1940s.

New York State Route 94 may also refer to:

- New York State Route 94 (1930 – early 1940s) in Cattaraugus and Allegany Counties
- New York State Route 94 (early 1940s – 1949) in Rockland County
