= Hinsdale, New York =

- Town
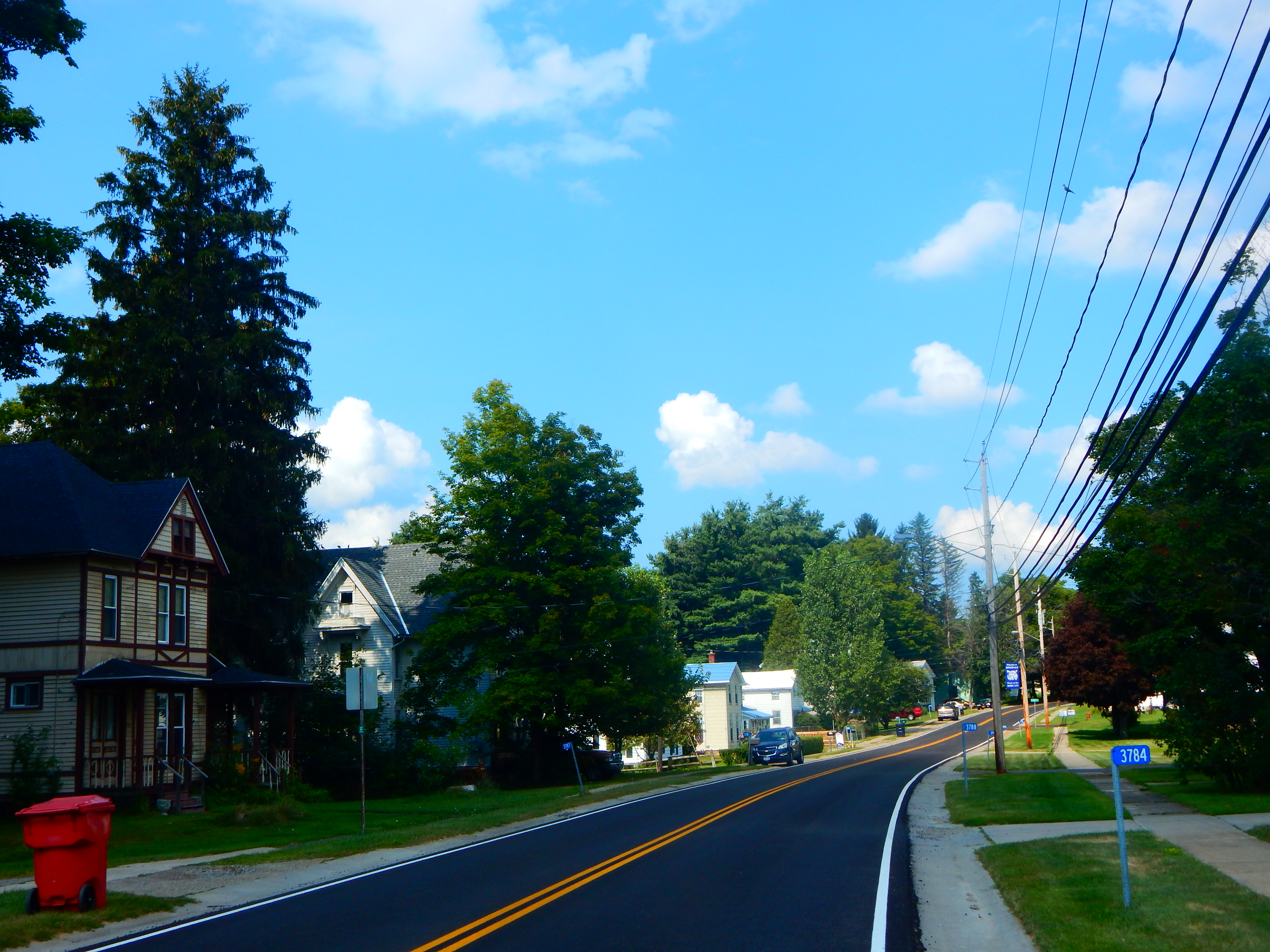
- The hamlet of Hinsdale along County Route 26.

- Location within New York Location within the United States
- Coordinates: 42°10′1″N 78°23′16″W
- Country: United States
- State: New York
- County: Cattaraugus

Government
  - Type: Town Council
  - Town Supervisor: Jeff VanDecar
  - Town Council: List of town officials: • Clerk: Ann Carr; • Assessor: Bobbi Elderkin; • Highway Supt.: Jeremy Guthrie; • Code Enforcement: Ryan Reed; • Dog Control Officer: Cynthia Nupp; • Historian: Stephen Clute; • Water Supt.: Gregory Church

Area
  - Total: 38.77 sq mi (100.42 km^{2})
  - Land: 38.73 sq mi (100.31 km^{2})
  - Water: 0.042 sq mi (0.11 km^{2})
- Elevation: 1,499 ft (457 m)

Population (2020)
  - Total: 2,119
  - Estimate (2021): 2,110
  - Density: 53.9/sq mi (20.82/km^{2})
- Time zone: UTC-5 (Eastern (EST))
  - Summer (DST): UTC-4 (EDT)
- ZIP Codes: 14743 (Hinsdale); 14706 (Allegany); 14727 (Cuba); 14760 (Olean)
- Area code: 716
- FIPS code: 36-009-34946
- GNIS feature ID: 0979069
- Website: hinsdaleny.org

Hinsdale is a town in Cattaraugus County, New York, United States. The population was 2,119 at the 2020 census. The town was named after Hinsdale in New Hampshire.

Hinsdale is at the eastern border of Cattaraugus County, north-northeast of Olean.

== History ==
Hinsdale was formed in 1820, bordering the town of Olean. It was named after the town of Hinsdale, New Hampshire. The town of Ischua was created in 1846, as separate from Hinsdale, although the two towns share a zip code.

In 1820, the local community congregated and came to the decision that they no longer wanted to be part of the town known as Hamilton (now Olean). They contacted their representative in Albany, Elial Todd Foote, a resident of Jamestown. They asked Foote to deliver to the legislature in Albany a resolution that would allow them to form their own community, which they would attempt to name "Fayette". Because of conflicting names (Fayette and Fayetteville) the resolution ultimately failed. The legislature informed Foote that he would be given until the next day to decide on a new name, or be forced to wait until the legislature's next session in the fall of that year. With no way to communicate with the locals back in Hamilton, who sought to create a new town, it was up to Foote to submit a new name. After spending a sleepless night attempting to derive a new name for the town, Foote decided to settle on Hinsdale, New Hampshire, the birthplace of his mother, Debbie Doolittle Foote. Thus, on April 14, 1820, the town of Hinsdale, New York, was born.

In 1846, those who resided in the present town of Ischua decided that they no longer wanted to be part of the Hinsdale community, thus creating their own town.

== Geography ==
According to the United States Census Bureau, the town has a total area of 38.8 square miles (100.4 km^{2}), of which 38.7 square miles (100.3 km^{2}) is land and 0.04 square miles (0.1 km^{2}), or 0.11%, is water.

The Southern Tier Expressway (Interstate 86 and New York State Route 17) passes across the town. New York State Route 16 is a major trunk road in the town and partially follows the same path as the Expressway. New York State Route 446 crosses the northeast part of the town and has its western terminus in the community of Maplehurst.

The eastern town line is the border of Allegany County.

=== Adjacent towns and areas ===
Hinsdale is south of the town of Ischua and north of the towns of Olean and Portville. The west border is formed by the towns of Humphrey and Allegany. The east border is formed by the towns of Cuba and Clarksville in Allegany County.

== Demographics ==
Historical population
Census	Pop.	Note	%±
1830	919		—
1840	1,937		110.8%
1850	1,302		−32.8%
1860	1,708		31.2%
1870	1,491		−12.7%
1880	1,594		6.9%
1890	1,312		−17.7%
1900	1,218		−7.2%
1910	1,125		−7.6%
1920	972		−13.6%
1930	969		−0.3%
1940	1,079		11.4%
1950	1,240		14.9%
1960	1,538		24.0%
1970	1,781		15.8%
1980	2,182		22.5%
1990	2,095		−4.0%
2000	2,270		8.4%
2010	2,168		−4.5%
2020	2,119		−2.3%
2021 (est.)	2,110		−0.4%
U.S. Decennial Census

As of the census of 2000, there were 2,270 people, 861 households, and 625 families residing in the town. The population density was 58.6 inhabitants per square mile (22.6/km^{2}). There were 1,134 housing units at an average density of 29.3 per square mile (11.3/km^{2}). The racial makeup of the town was 97.05% White, 0.57% African American, 0.44% Native American, 0.22% Asian, 0.18% from other races, and 1.54% from two or more races. Hispanic or Latino of any race were 0.79% of the population.

There were 861 households, out of which 34.0% had children under the age of 18 living with them, 58.3% were married couples living together, 9.4% had a female householder with no husband present, and 27.3% were non-families. 20.6% of all households were made up of individuals, and 8.2% had someone living alone who was 65 years of age or older. The average household size was 2.59 and the average family size was 3.00.

In the town, the population was spread out, with 26.7% under the age of 18, 6.9% from 18 to 24, 27.5% from 25 to 44, 25.9% from 45 to 64, and 13.1% who were 65 years of age or older. The median age was 39 years. For every 100 females, there were 96.5 males. For every 100 females age 18 and over, there were 96.6 males.

The median income for a household in the town was $33,110, and the median income for a family was $36,949. Males had a median income of $27,008 versus $20,645 for females. The per capita income for the town was $14,985. About 9.6% of families and 14.9% of the population were below the poverty line, including 18.7% of those under age 18 and 10.8% of those age 65 or over.

== Communities and locations in Hinsdale ==
- Haskell Flats – A hamlet in the southeast corner of the town.
- Hinsdale – The hamlet of Hinsdale, where Ischua Creek and Oil Creek join to become Olean Creek. The community is located on NY Route 16, east of the Southern Tier Expressway. The first house was built in 1821.
- Maplehurst – A hamlet in the northern part of the town on NY 16 and north of the Southern Tier Expressway.
- Scotts Corner – A former community north of Hinsdale village.
- Jollytown – A former farming community in the eastern part of the town.
