= Bedford Corners Historic District =

Historic district in New York, United States

- U.S. National Register of Historic Places
- U.S. Historic district
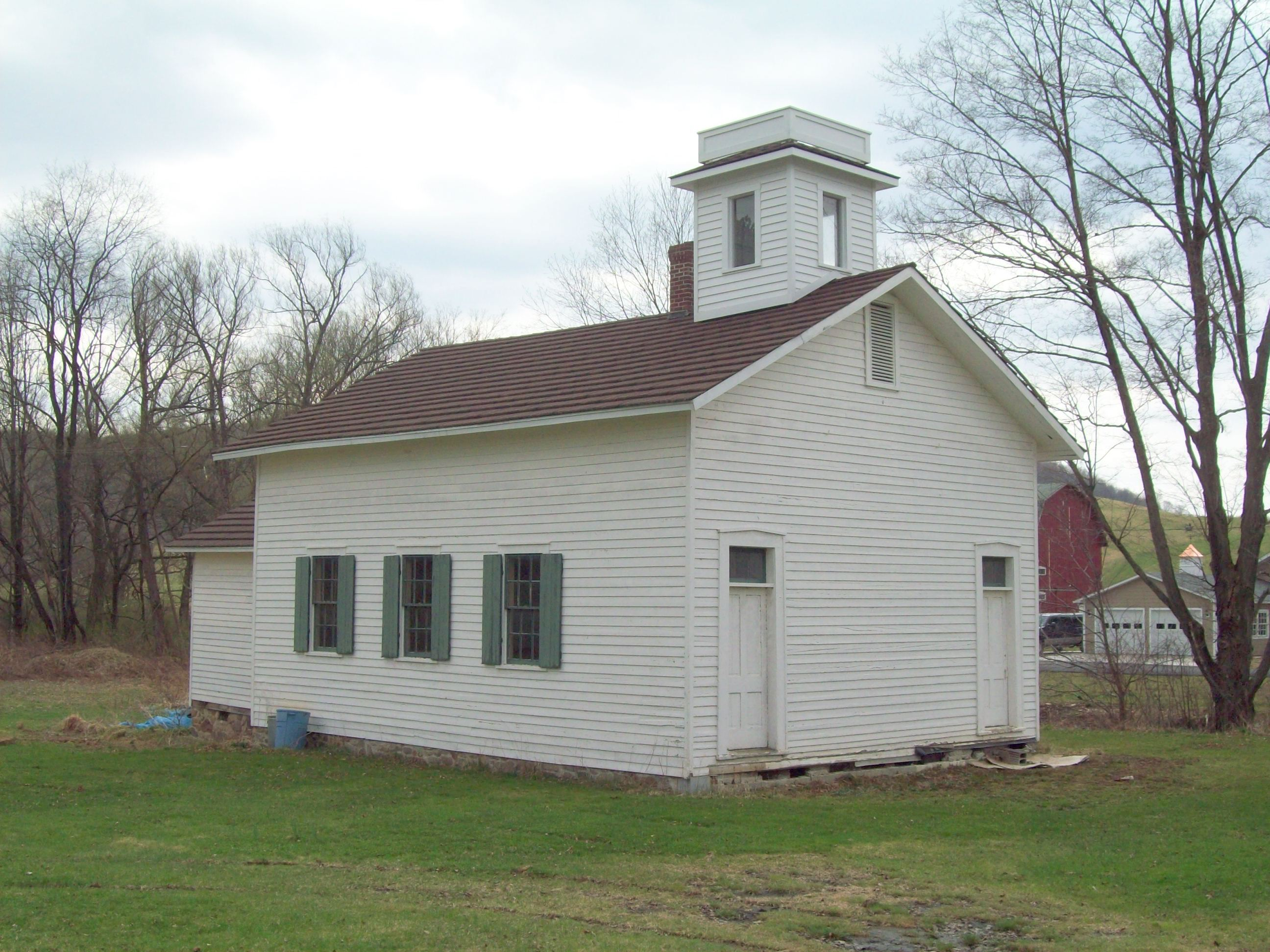
- Bedford Corners Historic District - Schoolhouse, April 2010

- Location within New York Location within the United States
- Location: NY 305 at Deer Creek and Dodge Creek Rds., Portville, New York
- Coordinates: 42°3′14″N 78°18′38″W
- Built: 1856
- Architectural style: Greek Revival
- NRHP reference No.: 03000590
- Added to NRHP: July 5, 2003

Bedford Corners Historic District is a historic district located at Portville in Cattaraugus County, New York. The district consists of three structures located at the intersection at New York State Route 305 and Deer Creek Road / Dodge Creek Road. The structures are a two-story, L-shaped, frame dwelling built about 1856 by early settler Jacob Bedford; a one-room schoolhouse built in 1864; and the Bedford Corners Cheese Factory / Grange Hall built after 1886. The district also includes the 50 acres (20 ha) surrounding the structures.

It was listed on the National Register of Historic Places in 2003.

== Gallery ==
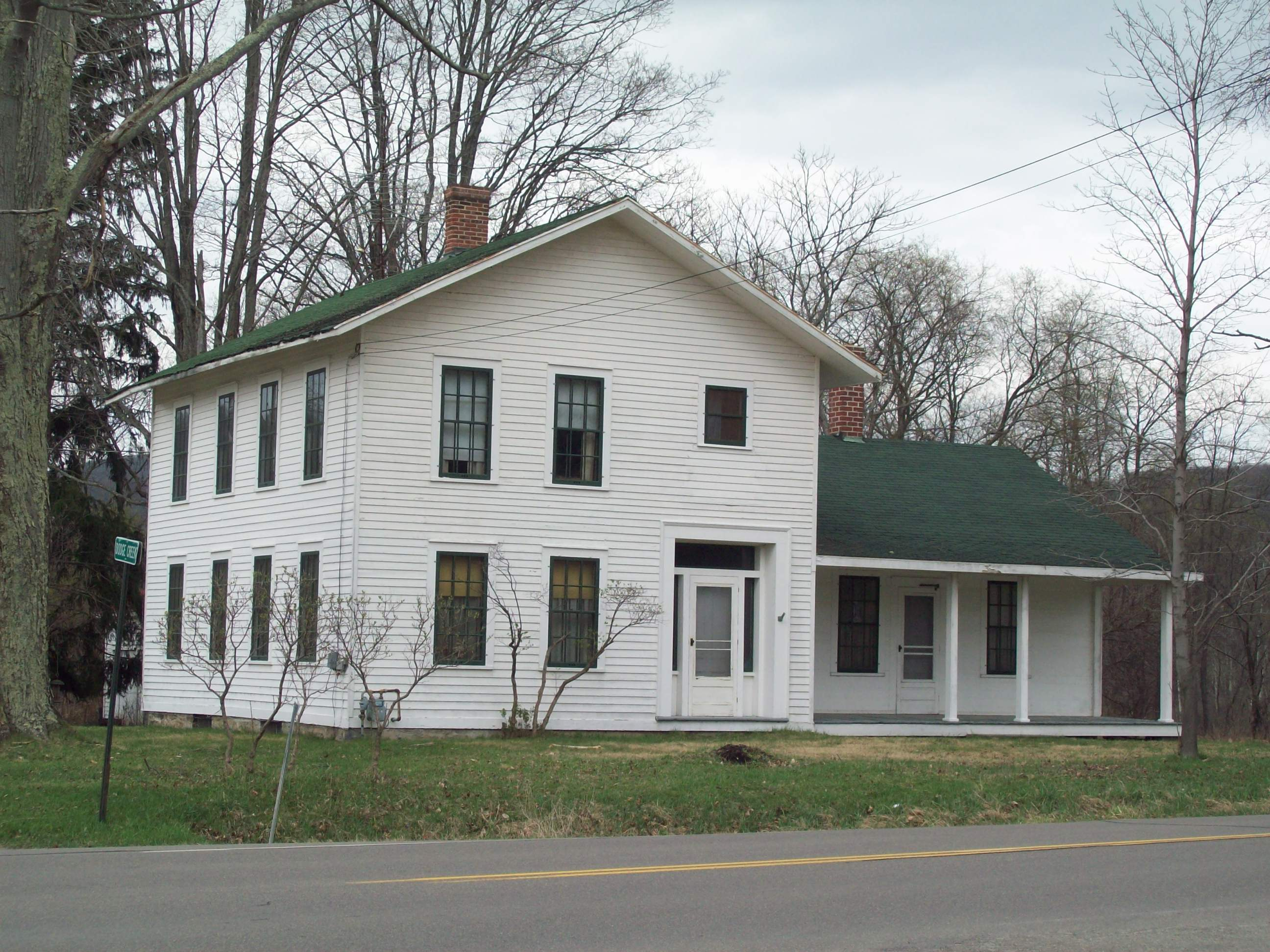
Bedford Dwelling, April 2010

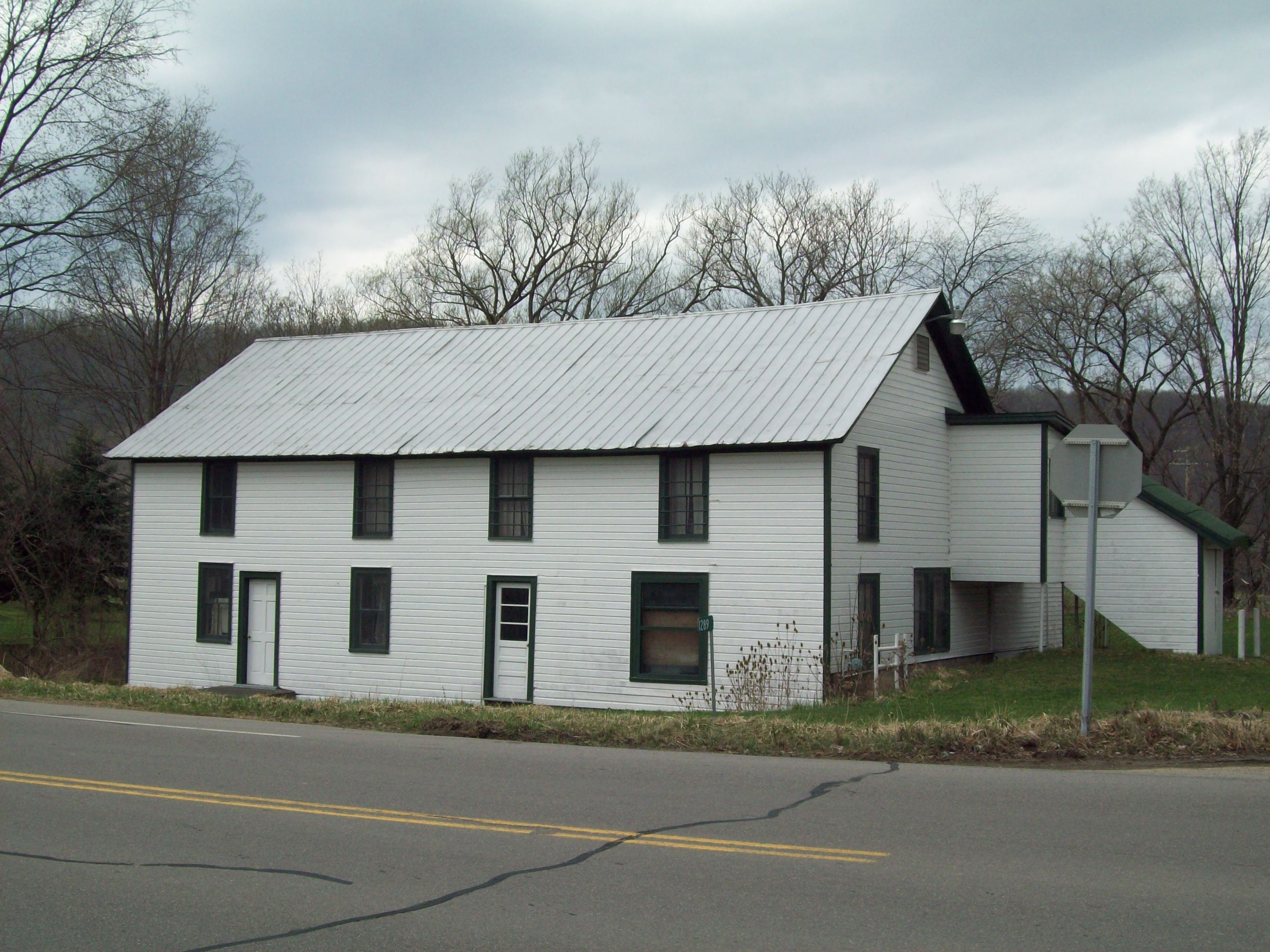
Cheese Factory / Grange Hall, April 2010
