= Humphrey, New York =

- Town
- Location within New York Location within the United States
- Coordinates: 42°12′42″N 78°31′17″W
- Country: United States
- State: New York
- County: Cattaraugus

Government
  - Type: Town Council
  - Town Supervisor: Carrie L. Childs (R)
  - Town Council: Members' List: • Jason Dry (R); • James Snyder (R); • Nancy L. Frazier (R); • Donald R. Prentice (R)

Area
  - Total: 36.61 sq mi (94.81 km^{2})
  - Land: 36.59 sq mi (94.77 km^{2})
  - Water: 0.015 sq mi (0.04 km^{2})
- Elevation: 1,841 ft (561 m)

Population (2020)
  - Total: 701
  - Estimate (2021): 697
  - Density: 18.0/sq mi (6.95/km^{2})
- Time zone: UTC-5 (Eastern (EST))
  - Summer (DST): UTC-4 (EDT)
- ZIP Codes: 14741 (Great Valley); 14706 (Allegany); 14737 (Franklinville); 14743 (Hinsdale)
- Area code: 716
- FIPS code: 36-009-36123
- GNIS feature ID: 0979085
- Website: www.humphreyny.org

Humphrey is a town in Cattaraugus County, New York, United States. The population was 701 at the 2020 census. The town is named after Charles Humphrey, who at the time of the town's founding was Speaker of the New York State Assembly.

Humphrey is an interior town in the eastern half of the county, northeast of the city of Salamanca.

== History ==
Origins

The area that would become the town was first settled circa 1815. The town of Humphrey was established in 1836 from a part of the town of Allegany.

The first permanent settler was named Russell Chapell. Who arrived from Schenectady County in 1815, settling on lot 56, on the banks of Sugartown Creek. Here, him and his wife built a log house, making them the first official settlers. Slowly over the next ten years the settlement grew.

== Geography ==
According to the United States Census Bureau, the town has a total area of 37.1 square miles (96.2 km^{2}), of which 0.02 square miles (0.04 km^{2}), or 0.05%, is water.

New York State Route 98 crosses the northwest corner of the town. Humphrey is primarily served by county roads, namely Routes 18, 19, and 51.

=== Adjacent towns and areas ===
Humphrey is east of the town of Great Valley and south of the town of Franklinville. The east town line is shared by the towns of Hinsdale and Ischua. To the south is the town of Allegany.

== Demographics ==
Historical population
Census	Pop.	Note	%±
1840	444		—
1850	824		85.6%
1860	963		16.9%
1870	1,065		10.6%
1880	997		−6.4%
1890	866		−13.1%
1900	794		−8.3%
1910	626		−21.2%
1920	531		−15.2%
1930	526		−0.9%
1940	424		−19.4%
1950	367		−13.4%
1960	415		13.1%
1970	405		−2.4%
1980	529		30.6%
1990	580		9.6%
2000	721		24.3%
2010	687		−4.7%
2020	703		2.3%
2021 (est.)	697		−0.9%
U.S. Decennial Census

As of the census of 2000, there were 721 people, 263 households, and 186 families residing in the town. The population density was 19.7 inhabitants per square mile (7.6/km^{2}). There were 457 housing units at an average density of 12.5 per square mile (4.8/km^{2}). The racial makeup of the town was 97.23% White, 0.97% African American, 0.83% Native American, 0.69% from other races, and 0.28% from two or more races. Hispanic or Latino of any race were 0.83% of the population.

There were 263 households, out of which 37.6% had children under the age of 18 living with them, 56.7% were married couples living together, 7.6% had a female householder with no husband present, and 28.9% were non-families. 22.1% of all households were made up of individuals, and 9.5% had someone living alone who was 65 years of age or older. The average household size was 2.74 and the average family size was 3.22.

In the town, the population was spread out, with 27.6% under the age of 18, 8.6% from 18 to 24, 28.6% from 25 to 44, 24.1% from 45 to 64, and 11.1% who were 65 years of age or older. The median age was 36 years. For every 100 females, there were 107.8 males. For every 100 females age 18 and over, there were 109.6 males.

The median income for a household in the town was $71,212, whereas the median household income in Cattaraugus County in general is $50,508 as of a 2022 American Community Survey. Males had a median income of $27,768 versus $20,326 for females. The per capita income for the town was $16,874. About 9.2% of families and 11.3% of the population were below the poverty line, including 14.4% of those under age 18 and 8.5% of those age 65 or over.

About 26.4% of Humphrey residents have obtained a Bachelor's Degree or higher. The educational attainment based on the above the age of 25 population is as follows: 36.4% have a high school degree or higher, 18.6% have attended college but did not receive a degree, 13.6% have obtained an Associate's Degree, while 8.7% have a Bachelor's Degree, and 17.7% earned a Graduate or professional degree.

== Communities and locations in Humphrey ==
- Humphrey – The hamlet of Humphrey is near the center of the town at the junction of County Roads 18 and 51. It was formerly known as "Chapellsburg" after an early hotel owner; another possible factor in its name was the Saint Pacificus Chapel, a Roman Catholic chapel and cemetery that is the only church in North America named for Saint Pacificus and an early congregation point for the Franciscans that later founded Saint Bonaventure University. The chapel remains in operation to the present day, albeit in a reduced schedule since 2007 since the death of its longtime priest and cutbacks in the Catholic Church.
- Humphrey Center – A hamlet in the northern part of the town on County Road 18. The community is locally called "Tickletown"; more about Tickletown can be found here.
- Wrights Creek – A stream flowing past Humphrey and Humphrey Center. It is named after early settler Richard Wright.
- Pumpkinville – An autumn theme park, pumpkin patch and apple cider mill based in the western part of the town.
