= Benjamin Gifford =

- Born: September 13, 1833; German Flatts, New York
- Died: July 14, 1901 (aged 67)
- Burial place: Hinsdale, New York
- Military career
- Allegiance: United States of America
- Branch: United States Army
- Service years: 1862 - 1865
- Rank: Private
- Units: (New York (state)) Company H, 121st New York Volunteer Infantry
- Conflicts: Battle of Sailor's Creek; American Civil War
- Awards: Medal of Honor

Benjamin Gifford (September 13, 1833 - July 14, 1901) was an American soldier who fought in the American Civil War. Gifford received his country's highest award for bravery during combat, the Medal of Honor. Gifford's medal was won for capturing the flag during the Battle of Sailor's Creek on 6 April 1865. He was honored with the award on May 10, 1865.

Gifford was born in German Flatts, New York. He joined the Army in August 1862, and mustered out with his regiment in June 1865. Gifford was buried in Hinsdale, New York.

== Medal of Honor citation ==
The President of the United States of America, in the name of Congress, takes pleasure in presenting the Medal of Honor to Private Benjamin Gifford, United States Army, for extraordinary heroism on 6 April 1865, while serving with Company H, 121st New York Infantry, in action at Deatonsville (Sailor's Creek), Virginia, for capture of flag.

== See also ==
- List of American Civil War Medal of Honor recipients: G–L
