= St. Bonaventure, New York =

- Census-designated place
- Location within New York Location within the United States
- Coordinates: 42°4′49″N 78°28′30″W
- Country: United States
- State: New York
- County: Cattaraugus
- Town: Allegany

Area
  - Total: 2.06 sq mi (5.33 km^{2})
  - Land: 1.91 sq mi (4.94 km^{2})
  - Water: 0.15 sq mi (0.39 km^{2})
- Elevation: 1,427 ft (435 m)

Population (2020)
  - Total: 1,963
  - Density: 1,029.8/sq mi (397.62/km^{2})
- Time zone: UTC-5 (Eastern (EST))
  - Summer (DST): UTC-4 (EDT)
- ZIP Codes: 14778 (Saint Bonaventure); 14706 (Allegany); 14760 (Olean)
- FIPS code: 36-64551
- GNIS feature ID: 1867415

St. Bonaventure is a hamlet and census-designated place (CDP) in the town of Allegany in Cattaraugus County, New York, United States. The population was 1,963 at the 2020 census.

This community, located between the village of Allegany and the city of Olean, is a college town established around St. Bonaventure University. Since the campus comprises the majority of the CDP, it has a much lower per capita income than most communities in the state, as do the several other CDPs statewide that are drawn around college campuses. St. Bonaventure also has its own on-campus post office and ZIP code (14778), separate from those of Allegany and Olean.

== Geography ==
St. Bonaventure is located at 42°4'49" North, 78°28'30" West (42.080297, -78.474904).

New York State Route 417 passes through the community, which is immediately north of the Allegheny River and south of the Southern Tier Expressway.

According to the United States Census Bureau, the CDP has a total area of 2.1 square miles (5.5 km^{2}), of which 2.0 square miles (5.1 km^{2}) is land and 0.15 square miles (0.4 km^{2}), or 7.16%, is water.

== Demographics ==
Historical population
| Census | Pop. | Note | %± |
|---|---|---|---|
| 2010 | 2,044 | | — |
| 2020 | 1,963 | | −4.0% |
U.S. Decennial Census; 2010 2020

=== 2020 census ===
St. Bonaventure CDP, New York – Demographic Profile (NH = Non-Hispanic)
| Race / Ethnicity | Pop 2010 | Pop 2020 | % 2010 | % 2020 |
|---|---|---|---|---|
| White alone (NH) | 1,765 | 1,623 | 86.35% | 82.68 |
| Black or African American alone (NH) | 102 | 153 | 4.99% | 7.79% |
| Native American or Alaska Native alone (NH) | 5 | 3 | 0.24% | 0.15% |
| Asian alone (NH) | 66 | 60 | 3.23% | 3.06% |
| Pacific Islander alone (NH) | 1 | 0 | 0.05% | 0.00% |
| Some Other Race alone (NH) | 1 | 0 | 0.05% | 0.00% |
| Mixed Race/Multi-Racial (NH) | 29 | 31 | 1.42% | 1.58% |
| Hispanic or Latino (any race) | 75 | 93 | 3.67% | 4.74% |
| Total | 2,044 | 1,963 | 100.00% | 100.00% |

Note: the US Census treats Hispanic/Latino as an ethnic category. This table excludes Latinos from the racial categories and assigns them to a separate category. Hispanics/Latinos can be of any race.

=== 2000 Census ===
As of the census of 2000, there were 2,127 people, 250 households, and 153 families residing in the community. The population density was 1,047.9 inhabitants per square mile (404.6/km^{2}). There were 265 housing units at an average density of 130.6 per square mile (50.4/km^{2}). The racial makeup of the CDP was 96.47% White, 1.83% African American, 0.33% Native American, 0.61% Asian, 0.33% from other races, and 0.42% from two or more races. Hispanic or Latino of any race were 1.50% of the population.

There were 250 households, out of which 24.0% had children under the age of 18 living with them, 48.4% were married couples living together, 8.8% had a female householder with no husband present, and 38.4% were non-families. 33.2% of all households were made up of individuals, and 18.8% had someone living alone who was 65 years of age or older. The average household size was 2.19 and the average family size was 2.78. In the area the population was spread out, with 5.1% under the age of 18, 74.6% from 18 to 24, 6.9% from 25 to 44, 7.9% from 45 to 64, and 5.5% who were 65 years of age or older. The median age was 21 years. For every 100 females, there were 89.6 males. For every 100 females age 18 and over, there were 88.9 males.

The median income for a household in the community was $38,438, and the median income for a family was $43,542. Males had a median income of $32,292 versus $21,591 for females. The per capita income for the CDP was $7,738. About 4.8% of families and 9.0% of the population were below the poverty line, including 11.5% of those under age 18 and 7.0% of those age 65 or over.
