= William E. Wheeler House =

Historic house in New York, United States

- U.S. National Register of Historic Places
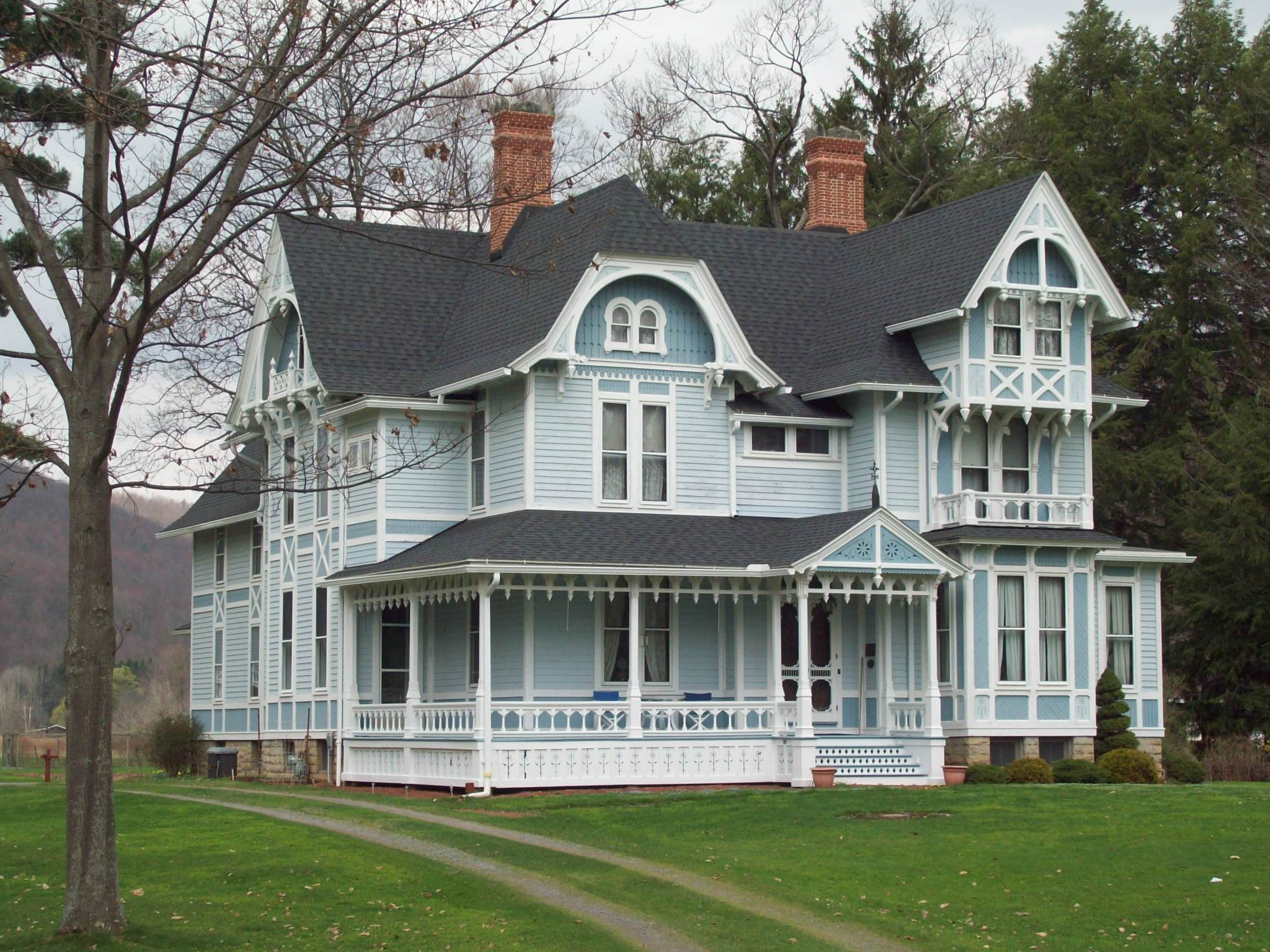
- William E. Wheeler House, April 2010

- Location within New York Location within the United States
- Location: 29 Maple Ave., Portville, New York
- Coordinates: 42°2′26″N 78°20′21″W
- Built: 1880
- Architect: Hall, Aaron
- Architectural style: Stick/Eastlake
- NRHP reference No.: 01001435
- Added to NRHP: January 11, 2002

William E. Wheeler House is a historic home located at Portville in Cattaraugus County, New York. It is a 2 1/2-story Stick-style wood-frame dwelling built in 1880. Also on the property is a contributing carriage house.

It was listed on the National Register of Historic Places in 2002.

== Gallery ==
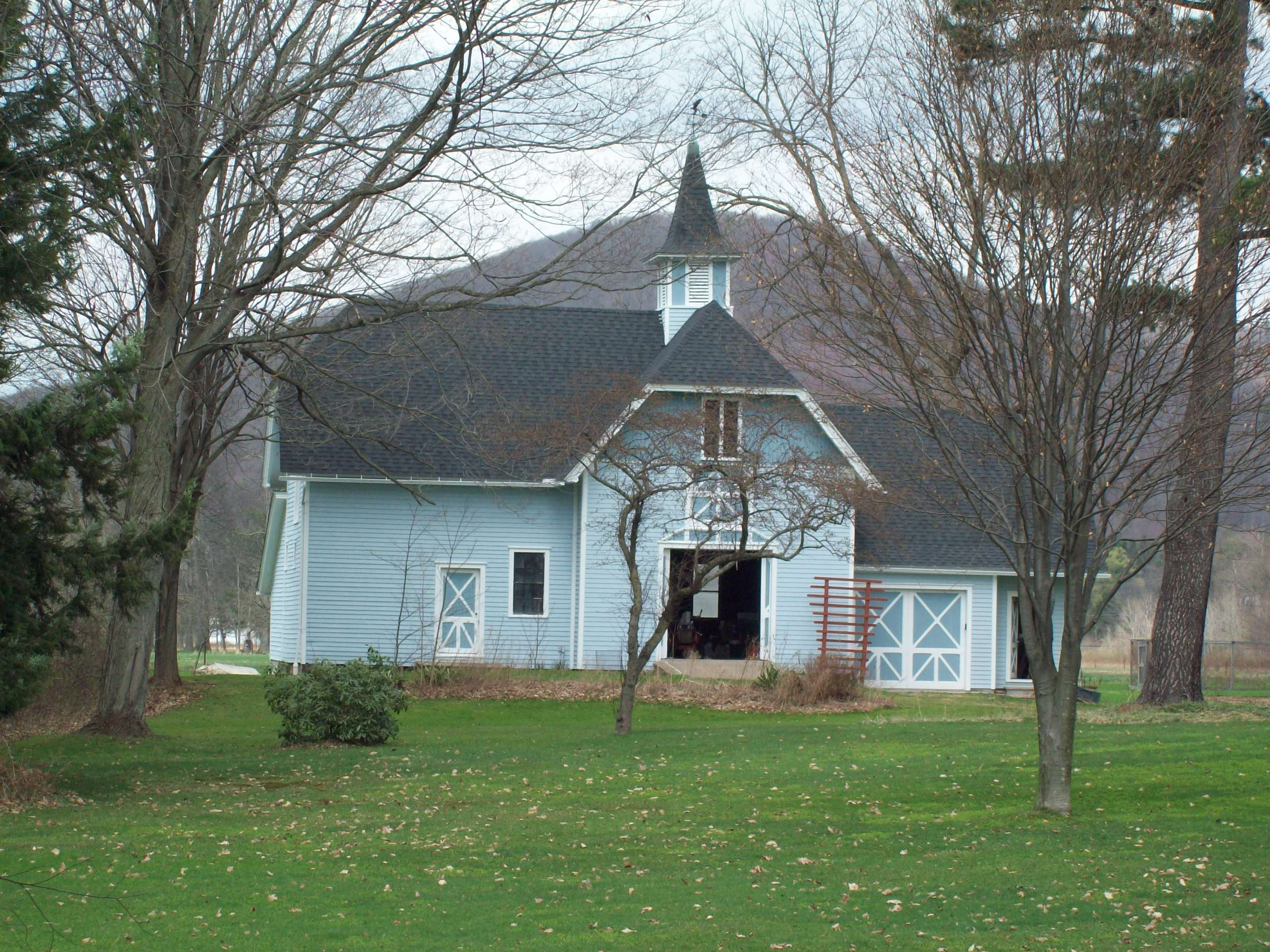
William E. Wheeler House, Carriage House, April 2010
