= Shawn Dubin =

American baseball player (born 1995)

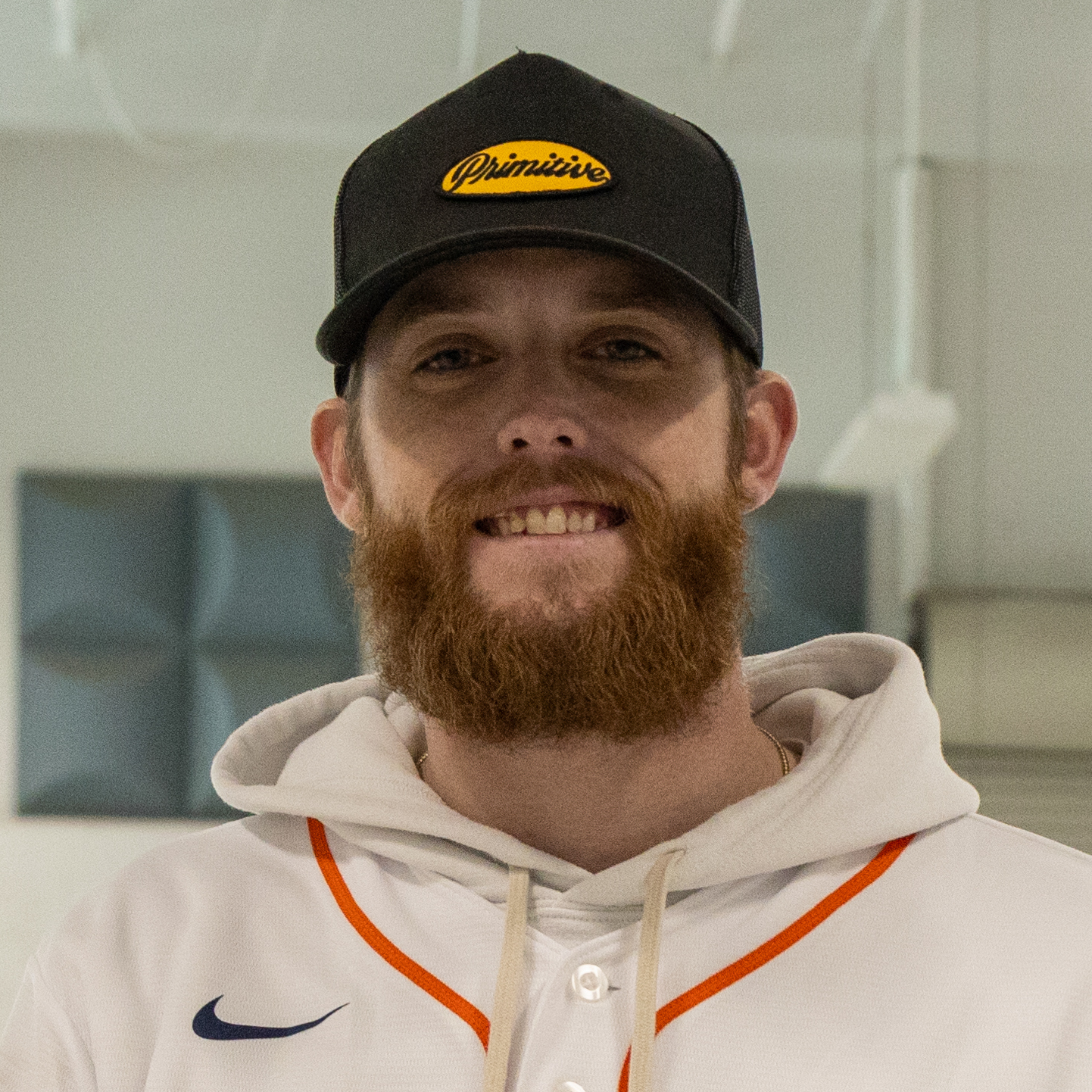
- Dubin with the Houston Astros in 2025

Free agent
- Pitcher
- Born: September 6, 1995 (age 31); Allegany, New York, U.S.
- Bats: Right Throws: Right

MLB debut
- June 19, 2023, for the Houston Astros

MLB statistics (through 2025 season)
- Win–loss record: 3–1
- Earned run average: 4.81
- Strikeouts: 88
- Stats at Baseball Reference

Teams
- Houston Astros (2023–2025); Baltimore Orioles (2025)

Shawn Anthony Dubin (born September 6, 1995) is an American professional baseball pitcher who is a free agent. He has previously played in Major League Baseball (MLB) for the Houston Astros and Baltimore Orioles.

== Amateur career ==
Dubin played soccer and baseball at Allegany-Limestone High School in Allegany, New York. He initially enrolled at Jamestown Community College where he hoped to play college soccer but dropped out and got a job at Lowe's. He was persuaded by a friend to try out for the college baseball team at SUNY Erie and earned a spot on the team. After one year at Erie, he transferred to the University at Buffalo where he played two seasons before Buffalo's baseball program folded in 2017. He played collegiate summer baseball with the Olean Oilers and won the 2016 New York Collegiate Baseball League championship. His eventual promotion to the Major Leagues would make him the first Oilers player to reach the majors. He finished out his college career in the National Association of Intercollegiate Athletics (NAIA) at Georgetown College.

== Professional career ==
=== Houston Astros ===
The Houston Astros drafted Dubin in the 13th round, with the 402nd overall selection, of the 2018 Major League Baseball draft. Dubin made his professional debut in 2018 with the Low-A Tri-City ValleyCats, pitching to a 4.60 ERA in 14 appearances. In 2019, he pitched for the Single-A Quad Cities River Bandits and High-A Fayetteville Woodpeckers, accumulating a 7–5 record and 3.58 ERA with 151 strikeouts across 25 games (19 of them starts). Due to the cancellation of the 2020 Minor League Baseball season due to COVID-19, he did not pitch for a team, but was a member of the Astros' 60-man player pool.

The Astros invited Dubin to their Spring Training in 2021. He did not make the team and spent the year with the Triple-A Sugar Land Skeeters, working to a 3.44 ERA with 69 strikeouts in 49 2/3 innings of work across 16 contests. He was selected to the 40-man roster following the season on November 19, 2021.

Dubin was optioned to the Triple-A Sugar Land Space Cowboys to begin the 2023 season. In nine games (five starts), he struggled to a 7.96 ERA with 25 strikeouts in 26 innings pitched. On June 18, 2023, Dubin was promoted to the major leagues for the first time. Dubin had fifteen friends and family fly to Houston from Western New York but did not appear in that day's game. He made his debut on June 19 against the New York Mets and struck out the first batter he faced, Brandon Nimmo. Dubin pitched two scoreless innings but allowed five runs in his third inning of work. Dubin made his first MLB start on July 2, allowing one run in four innings against the Texas Rangers at Globe Life Field. Following the game, the Astros added Brandon Bielak to the active roster and sent Dubin to Triple-A. Dubin finished the year in the minors, spending about three weeks of August on the injured list.

In 2024, Dubin appeared in 31 games for the major league club, posting a 1–1 W–L, 4.17 ERA, 45 hits, 26 bases on balls, 1.566 walks plus hits per inning pitched (WHIP) and 49 strikeouts over 45 1/3 innings. He filled a variety of roles, including 2 games started as opener, 2 saves, and 11 games finished. At Sugar Land in 2024, Dubin made 10 appearances, was 2–0, pitched 10 innings, allowed 4 runs with 8 hits and 5 strikeouts, and struck out 13,

Dubin made 23 appearances for Houston during the 2025 season, logging a 2–0 record and 5.61 ERA with 21 strikeouts across 25 2/3 innings pitched. Dubin was designated for assignment by the Astros on August 23, 2025.

=== Baltimore Orioles ===
On August 26, 2025, Dubin was claimed off waivers by the Baltimore Orioles. In seven appearances for the Orioles, he recorded a 3.38 ERA with seven strikeouts over eight innings of work. On November 6, Dubin was removed from the 40-man roster and sent outright to the Triple-A Norfolk Tides. He elected free agency the same day.

=== Arizona Diamondbacks ===
On December 19, 2025, Dubin signed a minor league contract with the Arizona Diamondbacks. He made two appearances for the Triple-A Reno Aces, struggling to an 0-1 record and 18.00 ERA with two strikeouts across two innings pitched. Dubin was released by the Diamondbacks organization on April 23, 2026.

=== Washington Nationals ===
On May 1, 2026, Dubin signed a minor league contract with the Washington Nationals. He made four appearances for the Triple-A Rochester Red Wings, recording a 5.40 ERA with three strikeouts across 3 1/3 innings pitched. Dubin was released by the Nationals organization on May 15.
