= Ischua, New York =

- Town
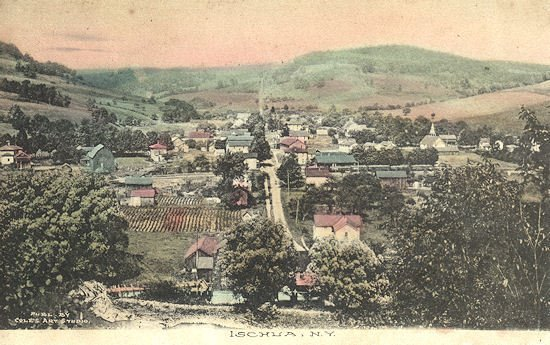

- Location within New York Location within the United States
- Coordinates: 42°14′19″N 78°23′10″W
- Country: United States
- State: New York
- County: Cattaraugus

Government
  - Type: Town Council
  - Town Supervisor: Alan R. Chambers (R)
  - Town Council: Members' List: • Jean A. Curtin (R); • Harriet E. Emmons (D); • Theresa M. Lowe (R); • Mark A. Sage (D)

Area
  - Total: 32.40 sq mi (83.91 km^{2})
  - Land: 32.38 sq mi (83.86 km^{2})
  - Water: 0.019 sq mi (0.05 km^{2})
- Elevation: 1,503 ft (458 m)

Population (2020)
  - Total: 736
  - Estimate (2022): 722
  - Density: 22.7/sq mi (8.78/km^{2})
- Time zone: UTC-5 (Eastern (EST))
  - Summer (DST): UTC-4 (EDT)
- ZIP Codes: 14743 (Ischua); 14727 (Cuba)
- Area code: 716
- FIPS code: 36-009-37825
- GNIS feature ID: 0979096
- Website: www.townofischuany.org

Ischua (/ˈɪʃweɪ/ ISH-way) is a town in Cattaraugus County, New York, United States. The population was 736 at the 2020 census. Ischua is also the name of a hamlet in the town. The town is on the eastern border of the county, north of Olean.

== History ==
The area that would become Ischua was first visited around 1808 by Seymore Buton and also visited around 1812 by Abram Farwell, who would return with his wife Lydia Farwell and their family. Lydia Jackson Farwell was the daughter of Revolutionary war soldier Thaddeus Jackson, builder of the Thaddeus Jackson House, the historic 2 1/2-story wood-frame house known as one of the oldest surviving homes in Brookline, Massachusetts, where Lydia was from. In 1814, Lydia Farwell inherited money through her father's family and bought the first tract of land in what is now the town of Ischua to build the Farwell sawmill on. The community of Ischua has had continuous settlement ever since that date, and the founding mother Lydia Farwell's family have been a part of the history of Ischua for generations since.

The town of Ischua was established in 1846 from a division of the town of Hinsdale. There was previously another "Town of Ischua" in the county, which has now been succeeded by the town of Franklinville and the rest of the northern part of Cattaraugus County. When first formed, on February 7, 1846, the present Ischua was known as the "Town of Rice". The first town meeting was held at the residence of E. Densmore, February 24, 1846. The first town officers were Frederick Carpenter, Supervisor; Isaac N. Fuller, Town Clerk; Philo Burlingame, Superintendent of Common Schools; Wm. S. Pitcher, Simon C. Mallory and A. L. Barnard, Assessors; and Morgan I. Titus, F. Carpenter, C.C. Hatch and Hiram L. Seavy, Justices of the Peace. Its name was changed March 27, 1855, from Rice to Ischua.

Cuba Creamery, situated in the southeast corner of the town, about 2 miles (3 km) from Cuba, was established in 1869, by Gardner & I.N. Sheldon, and made about 175,000 pounds (79,000 kg) of cheese and 18,000 to 20,000 pounds (8,200 to 9,100 kg) of butter at its height. Quarries of good building stone existed within the borders of the town to aid the early settlers in construction. After the Genesee Valley Canal failed, the Buffalo, New York and Philadelphia Railroad traversed the town in the valley of Ischua Creek.

The town had several telephone prefixes during the party line days shared with nearby communities such as Franklinville, Allegany and Cuba and including 557- that it shared with Hinsdale. The town had its own post office, in the early days known as West Hinsdale, then Rice, and finally Ischua (ZIP code 14746) until the early 1990s, when the ZIP code was abandoned and postal services merged with Hinsdale's.

== Geography ==
According to the United States Census Bureau, the town has a total area of 32.4 square miles (83.9 km^{2}), of which 0.019 square miles (0.05 km^{2}), or 0.06%, is water.

The east town line is the border of Allegany County. The surface of the town is a broken and hilly upland, the highest summits reaching 2,200 feet (670 m) above sea level, about 600 feet (180 m) above the valleys. Ischua Creek, which flows south through the center, is the principal stream, having formed the Ischua Valley. The head waters of Five Mile Run are in the south-west part. The soil is chiefly clay, with a thin surface of mold and some gravelly loam.

New York State Route 16 is a major north–south highway in the town, and it parallels Ischua Creek through most of the town.

=== Communities and locations ===
- Abbotts – A hamlet in the northeastern corner of the town on County Roads 24 and 87, located about 4/5 of a mile east of Cuba Lake on Abbotts Road centered at (42° 15' 25" N · 78° 19' 7" W; 42.25701,-78.31863).
- Cuba Lake – A small part of the lake is at the northeastern town line.
- Fitch – A hamlet in the northwestern corner of the town, south of NY Route 16 on County Road 19.
- Ischua – The hamlet of Ischua is at the convergence of NY Route 16 and County Roads 48 and 81 in the northern part of the town.
- Oil Springs Reservation – Part of the Oil Springs Reservation, Cattaraugus County is in the northeastern part of the town, a reservation of the Seneca at the eastern town line.
- Cattaraugus County-Olean Airport (OLE) – Ischua's Municipal Airport is located east of the hamlet of Ischua on County Road 81. This is a general aviation airport.
- Dutch Hill – Also known as Maple Hill and located in the southwestern portion of the town; settled in a large part by German speakers from the eastern Pennsylvania region.

=== Adjacent towns and areas ===
Part of the Seneca Indian Reservation is in the town of Ischua. The town of Cuba in Allegany County is on the eastern town line of Ischua. Ischua shares its southern town boundary with the town of Hinsdale and the western town line with the town of Humphrey. The towns of Franklinville and Lyndon are to the north.

== Genesee Valley Canal ==
On May 6, 1836, an act was passed in the New York Legislature authorizing the construction of the Genesee Valley Canal. According to New York State archives, the reservoir supplying the summit level impounded 68,000,000 cubic feet of water. A non-navigable feeder creek carried water to the summit at Hinsdale after crossing Oil Creek on an aqueduct.

Because Ischua Creek runs north to south to the Allegheny River and the still waters of the Ischua run deep, the town of Ischua was the perfect area to build a dam and utilize the water-way. Routing the canal through the Ischua-Hinsdale area enabled merchants to transport commerce from Rochester to Pittsburgh. Thirteen feeder creeks fed the canal. The contract for the culverts on the Ischua feeder, as well as on lock sections 98 through 101, in Maplehurst, was awarded to Joseph T. Lyman and Dauphin Murray on October 11, 1839. The Ischua Dam creating the Farwell reservoir for the Genesee Valley Canal was completed in 1856.

The town of Ischua bought the Ischua Dam area, the property located on Route 16 and Farwell Road, that houses the spillway and dam, from Cattaraugus County, for the purpose of development of this site as an educational area, because of its historical aspect and the possibility of creating a recreation area. Also on the property is one of Ischua's one-room schoolhouses, built in 1881, that houses the Town of Ischua Historical Society. For many decades there was an A-framed house that stood next to it, the town tore it down in 2015, disrupting the historic canal site with heavy equipment and causing destruction to the remains of the Dam's earthen structure.

== Notable person ==
- U.S. Army Staff Sergeant Timothy Kellner, regarded as one of the top snipers still active in the U.S. Army, with 139 confirmed kills during Operation Iraqi Freedom.

== Demographics ==
Historical population
| Census | Pop. | Note | %± |
|---|---|---|---|
| 1850 | 906 | | — |
| 1860 | 986 | | 8.8% |
| 1870 | 872 | | −11.6% |
| 1880 | 935 | | 7.2% |
| 1890 | 853 | | −8.8% |
| 1900 | 832 | | −2.5% |
| 1910 | 803 | | −3.5% |
| 1920 | 656 | | −18.3% |
| 1930 | 566 | | −13.7% |
| 1940 | 503 | | −11.1% |
| 1950 | 622 | | 23.7% |
| 1960 | 562 | | −9.6% |
| 1970 | 655 | | 16.5% |
| 1980 | 775 | | 18.3% |
| 1990 | 847 | | 9.3% |
| 2000 | 895 | | 5.7% |
| 2010 | 859 | | −4.0% |
| 2020 | 736 | | −14.3% |
| 2022 (est.) | 722 | | −1.9% |
U.S. Decennial Census

As of the census of 2000, there were 895 people, 345 households, and 245 families residing in the town. The population density was 27.6 inhabitants per square mile (10.7/km^{2}). There were 496 housing units at an average density of 15.3 units per square mile (5.9 units/km^{2}). The racial makeup of the town was 98.21% White, 0.45% Native American, 0.11% Asian, 0.89% from other races, and 0.34% from two or more races. Hispanic or Latino of any race were 0.45% of the population.

There were 345 households, out of which 30.7% had children under the age of 18 living with them, 59.7% were married couples living together, 5.8% had a female householder with no husband present, and 28.7% were non-families. 21.7% of all households were made up of individuals, and 8.1% had someone living alone who was 65 years of age or older. The average household size was 2.59 and the average family size was 3.01.

In the town, the population was spread out, with 25.3% under the age of 18, 7.6% from 18 to 24, 27.0% from 25 to 44, 27.3% from 45 to 64, and 12.8% who were 65 years of age or older. The median age was 41 years. For every 100 females, there were 114.6 males. For every 100 females age 18 and over, there were 111.0 males.

The median income for a household in the town was $34,926, and the median income for a family was $38,173. Males had a median income of $28,155 versus $19,306 for females. The per capita income for the town was $14,414. About 9.9% of families and 14.0% of the population were below the poverty line, including 20.0% of those under age 18 and 5.2% of those age 65 or over.
