= West Clarksville, New York =

- Hamlet
- Location within New York Location within the United States
- Coordinates: 42°07′41″N 78°14′35″W
- Country: United States
- State: New York
- County: Allegany
- Town: Clarksville
- Elevation: 1,588 ft (484 m)
- Time zone: UTC-5 (Eastern (EST))
  - Summer (DST): UTC-4 (EDT)
- ZIP code: 14786
- Area code: 585
- GNIS feature ID: 969180

West Clarksville is a hamlet in the town of Clarksville, Allegany County, New York, United States. It is located along New York State Route 305, 6.4 miles (10.3 km) south-southeast of Cuba. West Clarksville has a post office with ZIP code 14786.
