= Portville, New York =

- Town
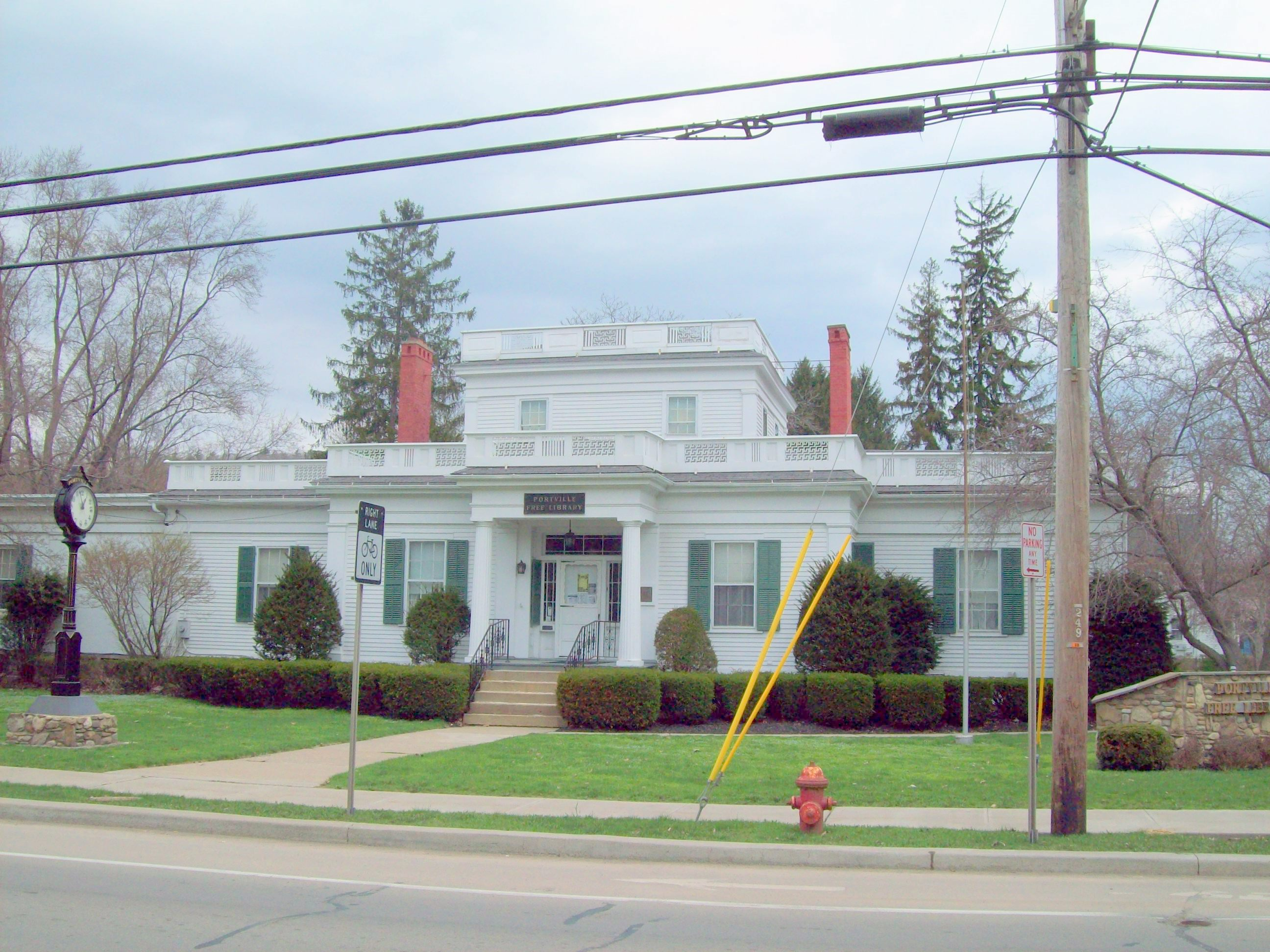
- Portville Free Library

- Location within New York Location within the United States
- Coordinates: 42°2′19″N 78°20′27″W
- Country: United States
- State: New York
- County: Cattaraugus

Government
  - Type: Town Council
  - Town Supervisor: Timothy Emley, R)
  - Town Council: Members' List: • Thomas Rowe, (R); • David Suain (R); • Melinda Deyoe R), (D; • Stewart Frost (R)

Area
  - Total: 36.03 sq mi (93.31 km^{2})
  - Land: 35.58 sq mi (92.15 km^{2})
  - Water: 0.45 sq mi (1.16 km^{2})
- Elevation: 1,433 ft (437 m)

Population (2010)
  - Total: 3,730
  - Estimate (2021): 3,480
  - Density: 101.2/sq mi (39.07/km^{2})
- Time zone: Eastern (EST)
- ZIP Codes: 14770 (Portville); 14788 (Westons Mills); 14760 (Olean); 14727 (Cuba)
- FIPS code: 36-009-59509
- Website: www.portvilleny.gov

Portville is a town in Cattaraugus County, New York, United States. The population was 3,504 at the 2020 census. The name is derived from the town's early role in shipping lumber and other items down the Allegheny River. It was formed in 1837 from the town of Olean.

Portville is in the southeast corner of the county, southeast of the city of Olean. The village of Portville is the largest settlement in the town.

== Geography ==
According to the United States Census Bureau, the town has a total area of 36.0 square miles (93.3 km^{2}), of which 35.6 square miles (92.2 km^{2}) is land and 0.46 square miles (1.2 km^{2}), or 1.24%, is water.

Portville is located in the southeast corner of the county. Its eastern town line is the border of Allegany County, and its southern town line is the McKean County, Pennsylvania, border.

The Allegheny River flows through the south part of the town. Oswayo Creek joins the Allegheny south of Portville village, and Dodge Creek joins the river in the village.

New York State Route 305 (running north–south) and New York State Route 417 (running east–west) pass through the town.

=== Adjacent towns and areas ===
Eldred and Ceres townships in McKean County, Pennsylvania, are south of Portville. The towns of Clarksville and Genesee in Allegany County form the eastern boundary. The town of Olean is on the west, and the town of Hinsdale is to the north.

== Demographics ==
Historical population
Census	Pop.	Note	%±
1840	462		—
1850	747		61.7%
1860	1,625		117.5%
1870	1,814		11.6%
1880	2,400		32.3%
1890	2,339		−2.5%
1900	2,319		−0.9%
1910	2,371		2.2%
1920	2,164		−8.7%
1930	2,407		11.2%
1940	2,593		7.7%
1950	3,029		16.8%
1960	3,321		9.6%
1970	4,252		28.0%
1980	4,486		5.5%
1990	4,397		−2.0%
2000	3,952		−10.1%
2010	3,730		−5.6%
2020	3,504		−6.1%
2021 (est.)	3,480	▼	−0.7%
U.S. Decennial Census

As of the census of 2000, there were 3,952 people, 1,545 households, and 1,121 families residing in the town. The population density was 110.9 inhabitants per square mile (42.8/km^{2}). There were 1,693 housing units at an average density of 47.5 per square mile (18.3/km^{2}). The racial makeup of the town was 97.93% White, 0.76% Black or African American, 0.15% Native American, 0.23% Asian, 0.03% Pacific Islander, 0.20% from other races, and 0.71% from two or more races. Hispanic or Latino of any race were 0.68% of the population.

There were 1,545 households, out of which 34.1% had children under the age of 18 living with them, 57.5% were married couples living together, 11.2% had a female householder with no husband present, and 27.4% were non-families. 23.6% of all households were made up of individuals, and 11.8% had someone living alone who was 65 years of age or older. The average household size was 2.56 and the average family size was 3.01.

In the town, the population was spread out, with 26.3% under the age of 18, 7.0% from 18 to 24, 26.4% from 25 to 44, 24.9% from 45 to 64, and 15.4% who were 65 years of age or older. The median age was 39 years. For every 100 females, there were 93.8 males. For every 100 females age 18 and over, there were 89.7 males.

The median income for a household in the town was $37,284, and the median income for a family was $41,270. Males had a median income of $34,279 versus $23,494 for females. The per capita income for the town was $18,043. About 8.7% of families and 10.4% of the population were below the poverty line, including 17.0% of those under age 18 and 6.5% of those age 65 or over.

== Communities and locations in the town of Portville ==
- Bedford Corners – A hamlet near the east town line on NY Route 305. The Bedford Corners Historic District was listed on the National Register of Historic Places in 2003.
- Carroll – A hamlet in the southeast corner of the town, east of the Allegheny River.
- Haydenville – A hamlet on the western town line on County Road 92.
- Lake View Terrace – A hamlet in the northeast part of the town on County Road 27.
- Main Settlement – A hamlet in the southeast corner of the town on NY Route 417.
- Mill Grove – a hamlet on the Allegheny River on Route 305 in the southeast corner of the town. It once marked the south extent of the Genesee Valley Canal.
- Portville – The village of Portville is a municipal corporation of ~430 properties and 1,000 persons located on 2+ square miles in the southeast part of the town on Dodge Creek by the Allegheny River. NY-305 and NY-417 conjoin through the village.
- Stephens Lake – A small lake north of Weston Mills.
- Toll Gate Corner – A location in the southeast corner of the town at the junction of Routes 305 and 417.
- Weston Mills – A hamlet on the north bank of the Allegheny River on Route 417. It was named after the Weston brothers, owners of several businesses.

== Government ==
The Town of Portville is a municipal corporation governed by a five-member elected town board. The town board is composed of one supervisor (two-year term beginning every even numbered year) and four councilpersons (four-year terms, of which two begin concurrently with each new supervisor term). The highway superintendent is an elected two-year term position and is run independently from the town board, except for receiving annual funding of the highway department budget. The town justice is an elected two-year position and is run independently of the town board, except for receiving funding on a monthly basis. All other positions are appointed and report to the town board.
