= Leon Jacob Cole =

American geneticist and ornithologist

Leon J. Cole
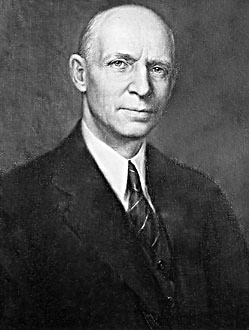
- Portrait by Othmar J. Hoffler (1893-1954), 1939
- Born: June 1, 1877; Allegany, New York
- Died: February 17, 1948 (aged 70); Madison, Wisconsin
- Education: University of Michigan; Harvard University
- Scientific career
- Fields: Genetics; Ornithology
- Workplaces: Yale University; University of Wisconsin

Leon Jacob Cole (June 1, 1877 – February 17, 1948) was an American geneticist and ornithologist. He was a professor of genetics at the University of Wisconsin. Apart from work on applications of genetics to agriculture and livestock, he examined the genetics of wild birds. He was among the early proponents of bird ringing in the United States of America.

== Biography ==
Cole was born on June 1, 1877, in Allegany, New York. He received his education at the Michigan State Agricultural College and later at the University of Michigan, from which he graduated in 1901. In 1906, Cole received his PhD from Harvard University. That same year, he married Margaret Belcher Goodenow; the couple had a daughter and a son.

He died in Madison, Wisconsin on February 17, 1948.

== Scientific career ==
=== Breeding and genetics ===
During the period from 1906 to 1910 Cole was in charge of the Division of Animal Breeding and Pathology at the Rhode Island Experiment Station, as well as an instructor in zoology at Yale University.

He joined the University of Wisconsin in 1910, to initiate the Department of Experimental Breeding, a forerunner of the university's Department of Genetics. He was made a professor in 1914, and held the title of Professor of Genetics from 1918 to 1947.

Cole's contributions to genetics covered a wide scope of interests, and he collaborated with a diverse group of researchers from various university departments who studied a range of plants and animals. His department's research explored the genetic improvement of corn and other food crops, poultry, dairy cattle, other livestock, bees, and fur animals. Among birds, Cole and his students focused on the genetics and hybridization of Columbidae, particularly domestic pigeons and ring doves. Along with papers considering plumage color, the team published work on the genetics of the birds' immunology, fertility, and physical defects.

In 1923, at the request of Secretary Henry Wallace, Cole took a one-year leave of absence to work for the Department of Agriculture, serving as Chief of the Husbandry Division in the Bureau of Animal Husbandry. In 1926–1927, he was elected chairman of the Division on Biology and Agriculture of the National Research Council. He also served as president of the Wisconsin Academy of Arts and Sciences (1924–1927) and of the Genetics Society of America in 1940.

In the 1920s, Margaret Sanger and the Birth Control Clinical Research Bureau invited Cole to serve on an advisory committee. He is credited with providing information about the potential positive eugenic effects of birth control.

=== Bird banding ===
Cole had a special interest in birds. He first proposed banding birds to study migration with a paper in 1902, "Suggestions for a Method of Studying the Migration of Birds." He tried a small-scale experiment in 1902, applying tags to fish, but the work was discontinued. In the winter of 1907–1908, a small number of birds were banded by Cole and members of the New Haven Bird Club. Shortly thereafter, at a meeting of the American Ornithologists' Union, the American Bird Banding Association was established, with Cole as president. In the period 1902–1922, Cole wrote seven papers on bird banding. For these efforts, he is regarded as the father of American bird banding; however, his relocation to Wisconsin in 1910 curtailed his ability to pursue banding in the field.

=== Expeditions ===
In 1899, Cole joined E. H. Harriman and a number of scientists and artists on the famous Harriman Alaska Expedition. On that expedition, he cultivated the friendship of bird artist Louis Agassiz Fuertes; much later, Fuertes made a painting of two of Cole's experimental ring doves, but apparently did not publish it.

In 1904 he joined an expedition to Yucatán, and collected and identified 128 species and subspecies of birds, reporting his work in the Bulletin of the Museum of Comparative Zoology. In the period 1901–1906, he also did field work in Bermuda, the Dry Tortugas, and at Woods Hole.

== Legacy and recognition ==
Cole received an honorary doctorate from Michigan State College in 1945.

== Selected publications ==
- Cole, Leon J. (1902). "Suggestions for a Method of Studying the Migrations of Birds". Report of the Michigan Academy of Science. 3: 67–70.
- Cole, Leon J. (1905). "The German Carp in the United States". Report of the U.S. Bureau of Fisheries for 1904: 523–641.
- Cole, Leon J.; Allen, Glover M.; Barbour, Thomas (November 1906). "Vertebrata from Yucatan". Bulletin of the Museum of Comparative Zoology. 50 (5): 99–160.
- Cole, Leon J. (9 August 1912). "A Case of Sex-Linked Inheritance in the Domestic Pigeon". Science. 36 (919): 190–192. Bibcode:1912Sci....36..190C. doi:10.1126/science.36.919.190. hdl:2027/hvd.32044107223786. PMID 17814436.
- Cole, Leon J. (June 1922). "The Early History of Bird Banding in America" (PDF). The Wilson Bulletin. 34 (2): 108–115.
- Cole, Leon J.; Park, J. S.; Deakin, Alan (1933). 'Seedy Cut' as Affecting Bacon Production. Research Bulletin. Madison, WI: University of Wisconsin Agricultural Experiment Station. pp. 1–61.
- Cole, Leon J.; Waletzky, Emanuel; Shackelford, Richard Max (1940). "A Test of Sex Control by Modification of the Acid-Alkaline Balance". Journal of Heredity. 31 (12): 501–502. doi:10.1093/oxfordjournals.jhered.a104825.
- Cole, Leon J.; Cumley, Russell W. (1942). "Differentiation of Old and New World Species of the Genus Columba". The American Naturalist. 76 (767): 570–581. doi:10.1086/281081. S2CID 85403396.
- Irwin, M. R.; Cole, Leon J. (September 1945). "Immunogenetic Studies of Cellular Antigens: Individual Differences between Species Hybrids". Genetics. 30 (5): 439–447. doi:10.1093/genetics/30.5.439. PMC 1209298. PMID 17247169.
- Cole, Leon J.; Shackelford, Richard Max (December 1946). Breeding Mutation Mink and Foxes. Special Bulletin. Madison, WI: University of Wisconsin Agricultural Experiment Station. hdl:2027/wu.89043816172.
- Cole, Leon J.; Johansson, Ivar (1948). "Inheritance in Crosses of Jersey and Holstein Friesian with Aberdeen-Angus Cattle". The American Naturalist. 82 (804): 145–170, 202–233, 265–280. doi:10.1086/281575. S2CID 84629712.
- Cole, Leon J.; Hollander, W. F. (1950). "Hybrids of Pigeon by Ring Dove". The American Naturalist. 84 (817): 275–308. doi:10.1086/281631. S2CID 83486088.
