= Thaddeus Jackson House =

Historic house in Massachusetts, United States

- U.S. National Register of Historic Places
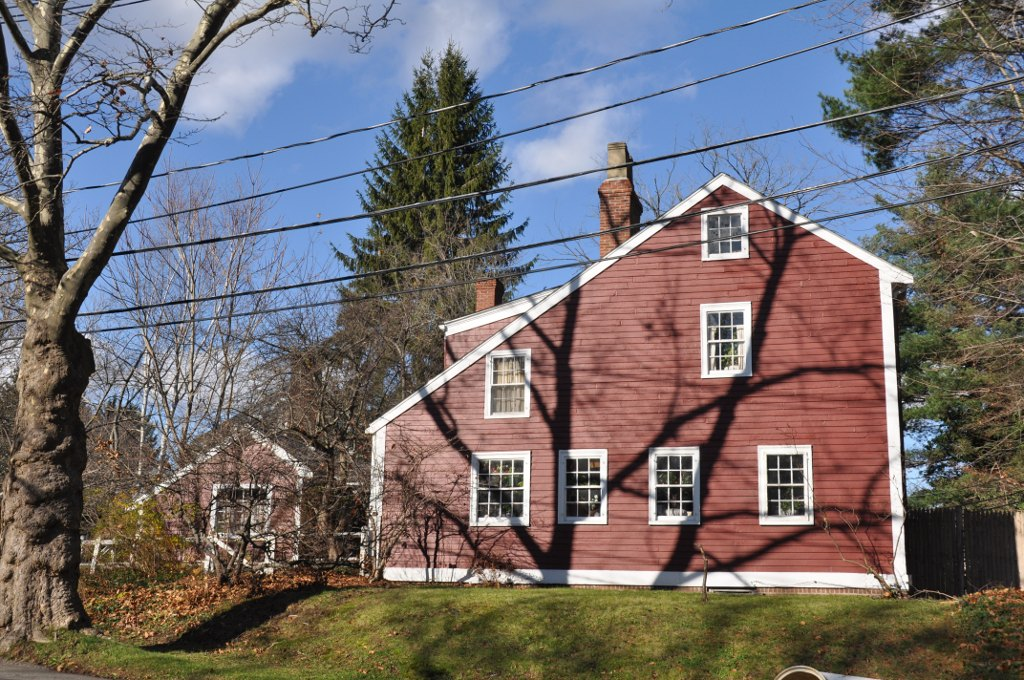

- Location within Massachusetts Location within the United States
- Location: 15 Alberta Road, Brookline, Massachusetts
- Coordinates: 42°18′21″N 71°9′16″W
- Built: 1820
- Architectural style: Georgian
- MPS: Brookline MRA
- NRHP reference No.: 85003295
- Added to NRHP: October 17, 1985

The Thaddeus Jackson House is a historic house at 15 Alberta Road in Brookline, Massachusetts. Built in 1820, it is one of Brookline's older surviving houses, unusual because it was built in the Georgian style, then already out of fashion. The house was listed on the National Register of Historic Places on October 17, 1985.

== Description and history ==
The Jackson House is set on the north side of Alberta Road, in an area now completely surrounded by residential development in southern Brookline. It is a 2 1/2-story wood-frame structure, five bays wide, with clapboard siding and a side-gable roof. A leanto section (probably original) extends to the rear, giving the house a colonial New England saltbox profile. Other features more typical of 18th century construction that were repeated here include placement of the window tops near the eaves, and the simple center doorway surround.

The house was built in 1820, and is one of Brookline's older surviving homes. Its styling is essentially late Georgian, unusual given its construction late in the Federal period. Thaddeus Jackson, the builder, was the son of Abraham Jackson, a local blacksmith.

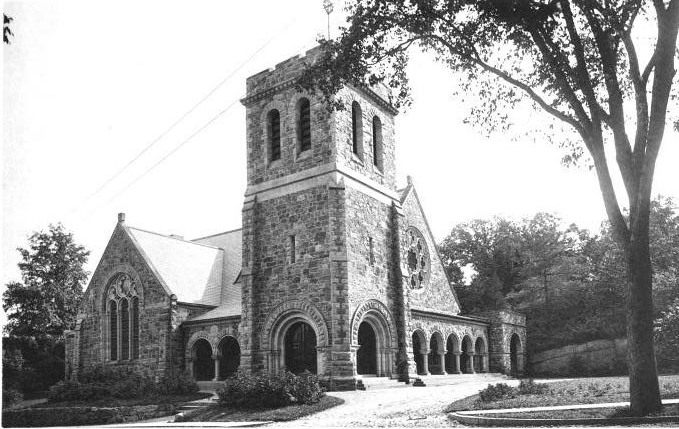
First Parish Church, Brookline

Thaddeus Jackson was also a successful blacksmith. He married Lydia Woodward, daughter of Caleb Woodward and Hannah Chever, on 14 October 1773 in Brookline's First Parish Church. They had nine children together, including Lydia Jackson Farwell, the founding mother of Ischua, New York. Jackson also served as a private in Capt. Thomas White's (Brookline) company of militia, Col. William Heath's regiment, in the Battles of Lexington and Concord that began the American Revolutionary War.

== See also ==
- National Register of Historic Places listings in Brookline, Massachusetts
