= New York State Route 305 =

Highway in New York

New York State Route 305
- Map of the Southern Tier in western New York with NY 305 highlighted in red

Route information
- Maintained by NYSDOT
- Length: 31.35 mi (50.45 km)
- History: Designated NY 94 in 1930; renumbered to NY 305 in early 1940s

Major junctions
- South end: PA 446 at the Pennsylvania state line in Portville
- I-86 / NY 17 / Southern Tier Expressway in Cuba
- North end: NY 19 in Belfast

Location
- Country: United States
- State: New York
- Counties: Cattaraugus, Allegany

Highway system
- New York Highways; Interstate; US; State; Reference; Parkways
← NY 304	→ NY 306

New York State Route 305 (NY 305) is a north–south route in the Southern Tier that runs from the Pennsylvania state line in Cattaraugus County to the hamlet of Belfast in Allegany County, where it ends at NY 19. It intersects the Southern Tier Expressway (Interstate 86 or I-86 and NY 17) in Cuba.

== Route description ==
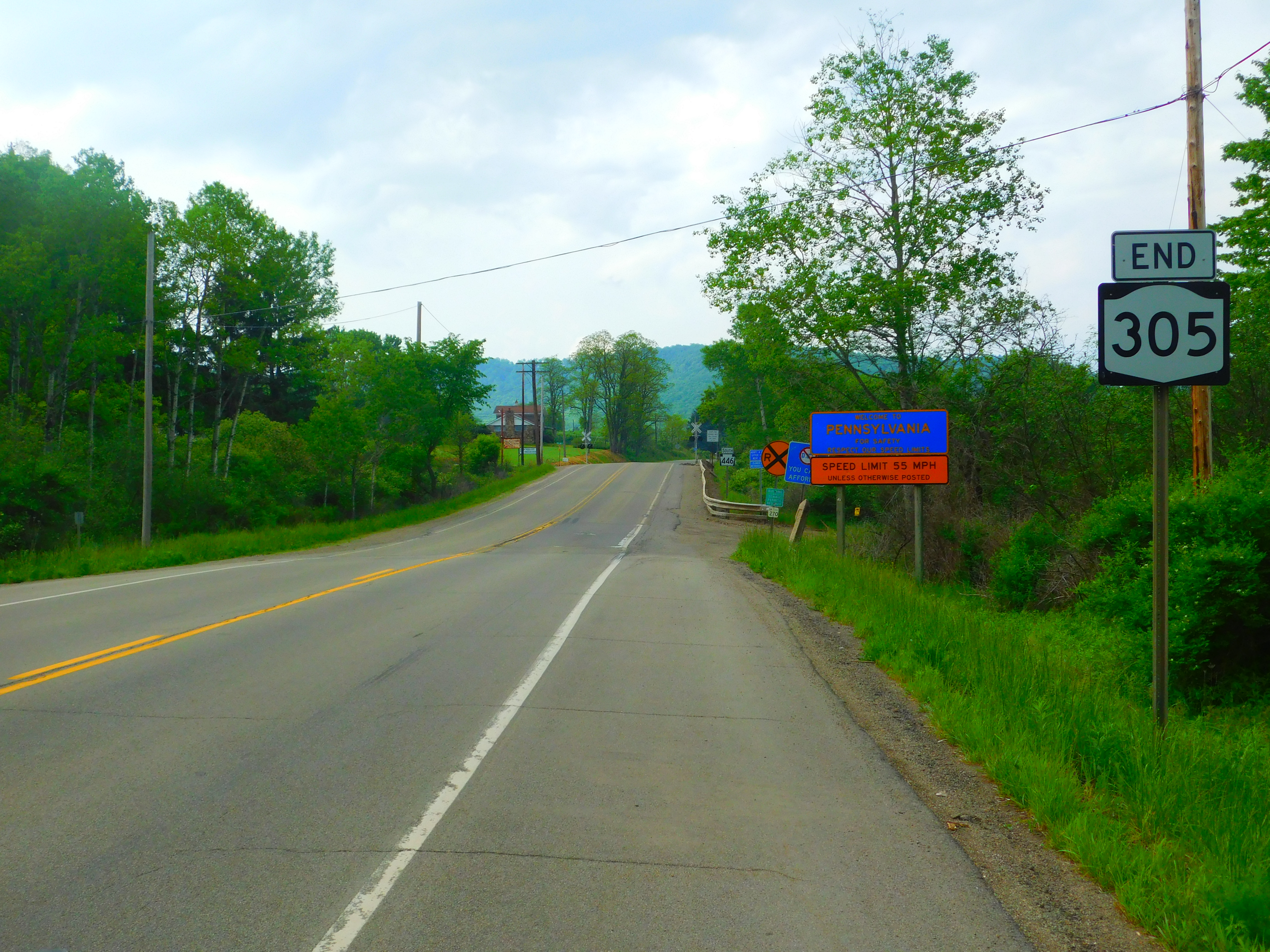
NY 305 approaching the Pennsylvania state line, where the road becomes PA 446

NY 305 begins at the Pennsylvania state line as a continuation of PA 446 in the town of Portville. The designation proceeds northward as Portville-Eldred Road, paralleling the Allegheny River and ponds as a two-lane rural highway. After an intersection with Barbertown Road, NY 305 enters the hamlet of Carroll and passes several residences northward. The route crosses Oswayo Creek, intersecting with NY 417 (Portville-Ceres Road). NY 305 and NY 417 form a concurrency, crossing north through the hamlet of Toll Gate Corner as a two-lane residential street, entering the village of Portville. In Portville village, NY 305 turns to the northeast away from NY 417 at an intersection with Brooklyn Street. Turning north on Brooklyn, paralleling a long stretch of residences and crossing the former Bradford Division. Passing east of Chestnut Hill Cemetery, NY 305 leaves the village.

In the town of Portville, NY 305 changes monikers to Portville-Obi Road, crossing into a two-lane rural highway. Paralleling Dodge Creek to the northeast, NY 305 crosses the county line from the town of Portville into the Allegany County town of Genesee, changing names to Obi Road. Continuing along Dodge Creek, NY 305 parallels several residences before bending northward into the hamlet of Obi in the town of Clarksville. In Obi, NY 305 intersects with County Route 5 (CR 5; Daggett Hollow Road) in the residential hamlet. Continuing northward, NY 305 enters the hamlet of West Clarksville, where the route becomes a two-lane residential street and an intersection with CR 40 (Jordan Hill Road). After leaving West Clarksville, NY 305 intersects with CR 1 (West Clarksville Road).

NY 305 bends to the northwest, entering the town of Cuba, paralleling several mobile homes into the hamlet of South Cuba. In South Cuba, the route intersects with CR 6 before entering the village of Cuba. In Cuba, NY 305 becomes known as South Street, crossing the former Erie Railroad main line into the village. Continuing northward, NY 305 becomes a two-lane residential street. At the intersection with CR 20 (East Main Street), NY 305 changes names to Genesee Street, intersecting with the eastern terminus of NY 446 (Water Street). After crossing a commercial strip, NY 305 enters interchange 28 of I-86 and NY 17 (the Southern Tier Expressway). Crossing a former railroad alignment, NY 305 continues through the town of Cuba as a two-lane road into the hamlet of North Cuba. Crossing an intersection with CR 25 (South Shore Road), NY 305 leaves North Cuba near Cuba Lake. After an intersection with CR 7, NY 305 parallels a railroad alignment into the town of New Hudson, where it enters the hamlet of Lyons Corners. Northeast of Lyons Corners, the route enters the hamlet of Black Creek, where NY 305 intersects with CR 41 (Tibbetts Hill Road). The two routes parallel, crossing northeast through New Hudson as a two-lane rural road. After, NY 305 enters the town of Belfast, paralleling several residences to the northeast and into the hamlet of Rockville, where the route turns eastward, crossing the former railroad right-of-way. After the right-of-way, NY 305 turns the southeast, crossing several residences.

After an intersection with Lake Road, NY 305 turns northeast through Belfast. Paralleling the former railroad right-of-way, the route remains rural for several miles, intersecting with NY 19 (Transit Hill Road) in the town of Belfast. NY 305 terminates at this intersection, along with the right-of-way.

== History ==
The segment of modern NY 305 north of Cuba was originally the southernmost portion of Route 16, an unsigned legislative route assigned by the New York State Legislature in 1908. At Belfast, Route 16 continued north on what is now NY 19. The Cuba–Belfast section of legislative Route 16 was assigned a posted route designation as part of the 1930 renumbering of state highways in New York when it was designated as the northern half of NY 94, which continued south through Cuba to NY 17 (now NY 417) in Portville. At the same time, what is now NY 45 in Rockland County was designated as NY 305. The NY 94 and NY 305 designations were swapped in the early 1940s, placing NY 305 on its current alignment from Portville to Belfast. South of Portville, what is now NY 305 was originally designated as part of NY 16 c. 1931. It was added to NY 305 in August 1962 when NY 16 was rerouted south of Olean to follow what had been NY 16A.

== Major intersections ==
County	Location	mi	km	Destinations	Notes
Cattaraugus	Town of Portville	0.00	0.00	PA 446 south – Eldred	Continuation into Pennsylvania
Cattaraugus	Town of Portville	1.89	3.04	NY 417 east (Portville-Ceres Road)	Southern terminus of NY 305 / NY 417 overlap
Cattaraugus	Village of Portville	2.67	4.30	NY 417 west (Portville-Ceres Road) – Olean	Northern terminus of NY 305 / NY 417 overlap
Allegany	Village of Cuba	18.33	29.50	NY 446 west (Water Street)	Eastern terminus of NY 446
Allegany	Village of Cuba	18.67	30.05	I-86 / NY 17 / Southern Tier Expressway – Jamestown, Binghamton	Exit 28 (I-86 / NY 17)
Allegany	Belfast	31.35	50.45	NY 19 (Transit Hill Road) to I-86 – Belfast, Letchworth State Park, Belmont	Northern terminus
1.000 mi = 1.609 km; 1.000 km = 0.621 mi: Concurrency terminus
