= Allegany, New York =

- Town
- Location within New York Location within the United States
- Coordinates: 42°05′22″N 78°29′37″W
- Country: United States
- State: New York
- County: Cattaraugus County
- Incorporated: 1831

Government
  - Supervisor: Christopher J. McPherson

Area
  - Total: 71.59 sq mi (185.43 km^{2})
  - Land: 70.93 sq mi (183.72 km^{2})
  - Water: 0.66 sq mi (1.70 km^{2})
- Elevation: 1,421 ft (433 m)

Population (2020)
  - Total: 7,493
  - Density: 108/sq mi (41.7/km^{2})
- Time zone: UTC-5 (EST)
  - Summer (DST): UTC-4 (EDT)
- ZIP Codes: 14706 (Allegany); 14760 (Knapp Creek); 14778 (Saint Bonaventure); 14753 (Limestone)
- Area code: 716
- FIPS code: 36-009-01297
- Website: www.allegany.gov

Allegany is a town in Cattaraugus County, New York, United States. The population was 7,493 at the 2020 census.

The Town of Allegany is on the south border of the county, west of the City of Olean. There is a village named Allegany inside this town.

The origin of the name Allegany is uncertain. It may have come from the name of a tribe called Allegewi that lived along the Allegheny River's banks. It may also be based on a Native American word meaning "lovely" or "beautiful".

== History ==
The town was first settled around 1820 by Ebenezer Reed, who moved from Connecticut. The Town of Allegany was formed on April 18, 1831, as the "Town of Burton" from a part of the town of Great Valley. On March 28, 1851, the name was changed to "Allegany.".

In 1836, part of Allegany was used to form the Town of Humphrey.

A new community to be called "Allegany City" was proposed in 1837 to be built south of the Village of Allegany, but the plan was halted after a planned railroad changed its route.

== Geography ==
According to the United States Census Bureau, the town has a total area of 71.7 square miles (185.6 km^{2}), of which 71.2 square miles (184 km^{2}) is land and 0.5 square miles (1.3 km^{2}) (0.68%) is water.

The Allegheny River flows through the town. The Southern Tier Expressway (Interstate 86 and New York State Route 17) passes across the town. New York State Route 417 (Old State Road) parallels the Expressway, and New York State Route 16 passes through the southeast corner of the town.

The south town line is the border of McKean County, Pennsylvania.

=== Adjacent towns and areas ===
Allegany is bordered to the south by the townships of Foster and Otto in McKean County, Pennsylvania. The Towns of Hinsdale and Olean form the east boundary. Allegany shares its north boundary with the Town of Humphrey and its west boundary with the Towns of Great Valley and Carrollton.

== Demographics ==
Historical population
Census	Pop.	Note	%±
1840	530		—
1850	1,037		95.7%
1860	2,129		105.3%
1870	2,485		16.7%
1880	4,044		62.7%
1890	3,611		−10.7%
1900	3,692		2.2%
1910	3,398		−8.0%
1920	3,240		−4.6%
1930	3,731		15.2%
1940	3,919		5.0%
1950	5,452		39.1%
1960	6,483		18.9%
1970	7,542		16.3%
1980	8,619		14.3%
1990	8,327		−3.4%
2000	8,230		−1.2%
2010	8,004		−2.7%
2020	7,493		−6.4%
U.S. Decennial Census

=== 2000 Census ===
At the 2000 census, there were 8,230 people, 2,599 households and 1,764 families residing in the town. The population density was 115.6 per square mile (44.6/km^{2}). There were 2,862 housing units at an average density of 40.2 per square mile (15.5/km^{2}). The racial make-up was 96.40% White, 0.79% Black or African American, 0.33% Native American, 1.32% Asian, 0.02% Pacific Islander, 0.26% from other races, and 0.87% from two or more races. Hispanic or Latino of any race were 0.94% of the population.

There were 2,599 households, of which 31.8% had children under the age of 18 living with them, 55.2% were married couples living together, 9.5% had a female householder with no husband present, and 32.1% were non-families. 25.6% of all households were made up of individuals, and 12.3% had someone living alone who was 65 years of age or older. The average household size was 2.51 and the average family size was 3.01.

19.6% of the population were under the age of 18, 26.6% from 18 to 24, 19.4% from 25 to 44, 21.6% from 45 to 64, and 12.8% who were 65 years of age or older. The median age was 30 years. For every 100 females, there were 89.4 males. For every 100 females age 18 and over, there were 86.8 males.

The median household income was $38,818 and the median family income was $45,972. Males had a median income of $36,801 and females $24,420. The per capita income was $15,667. About 3.1% of families and 8.6% of the population were below the poverty line, including 6.6% of those under age 18 and 7.5% of those age 65 or over.

== Communities and locations in the Town of Allegany ==
- Allegany – The village of Allegany in the eastern part of the town on NY Route 417 and south of the Southern Tier Expressway.
- Chipmunk – A hamlet in the southwest part of the town at the intersection of Chipmunk and Flatstone Roads and the confluence of Chipmonk and Flatstone Creeks.
- Crestview – A hamlet at the north border of Allegany village.
- Four Mile – A hamlet near the east town line on NY Route 16.
- Harrisburg – A hamlet in the southwest corner of the town along Harrisburg Run.
- Knapp Creek – A hamlet in the southwest corner of the town on NY Route 16. It has the highest elevation of any populated place in New York, at 2,349 feet (716 m). Knapp Creek once had its own ZIP Code, 14749; its post office was closed in 1996, and the U.S. Postal Service advises mail sent to Knapp Creek instead carry an Olean mailing address.
- Nichols Run – A hamlet on NY Route 45 by the south town line near Harrisburg and Knapp Creek.
- Pumpkin Hollow – A location near the north town line.
- Rock City – A hamlet in the southwest corner of the town, so named for its impressive ocean spar rock exposures.
- St. Bonaventure – A hamlet south of Allegany village, home to St. Bonaventure University
- Vandalia – A very small portion of this Allegany Indian Reservation hamlet enters the town of Allegany on its western border. The AIR's furthest upstream (eastern) border is slightly east of the town's western border.
- Wing Hollow – northwest of Allegany village, location of a long defunct ski operation, with the trails still visible on the hillside.

== Notable people ==
- Leon Jacob Cole, geneticist, ornithologist
- Terry Pegula, natural gas tycoon and professional sports owner; resided in Allegany during the 1980s
- Charlie Reynolds, former MLB pitcher
- Willard M. Smith, Civil War sergeant
- Shawn Dubin, Pitcher, Houston Astros
