= Belfast (CDP), New York =

Belfast, New York
- Hamlet & CDP
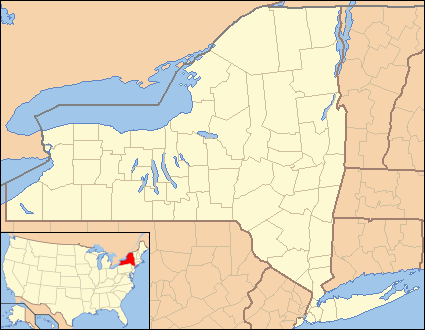
- Location within the state of New York
- Coordinates: 42°20′34″N 078°06′41″W
- Country: United States
- State: New York
- County: Allegany
- Town: Belfast

Area
  - Total: 1.58 sq mi (4.08 km^{2})
  - Land: 1.55 sq mi (4.01 km^{2})
  - Water: 0.027 sq mi (0.07 km^{2})
- Elevation: 1,309 ft (399 m)

Population (2020)
  - Total: 745
  - Density: 481.2/sq mi (185.79/km^{2})
- Time zone: UTC-5 (Eastern (EST))
  - Summer (DST): UTC-4 (EDT)
- ZIP code: 14711
- Area code: 585
- FIPS code: 36-05562
- GNIS feature ID: 943574

Belfast is a hamlet in the Town of Belfast, Allegany County, New York, United States. The population was 837 at the 2010 census, which lists the community as a census-designated place.

== Geography ==
Belfast is located at 42°20′34″N 078°06′41″W (42.3428443, −78.1113975) and its elevation is 1,309 feet (399 m).

According to the United States Census Bureau, Belfast has a total area of 1.412 square miles (3.66 km^{2}), of which 1.385 square miles (3.59 km^{2}) is land and 0.027 square miles (0.07 km^{2}) is water.

== Demographics ==
Historical population
Census	Pop.	Note	%±
2020	745		—
U.S. Decennial Census

As of the 2010 census, there were 837 people, 337 households, and 213 families. The population density was 593 inhabitants per square mile (229/km^{2}). There were 377 housing units at an average density of 267 per square mile (103/km^{2}). The racial makeup as of 2010 was 95.9% White, 0.7% Black or African American, 0.2% American Indian and Alaska Native, 1.1% Asian, 0.2% from other races, and 0.1% from two or more races. Hispanic or Latino of any race were 0.7% of the population.

There were 337 households, out of which 34.4% had children under the age of 18 living with them, 45.1% were married couples living together, 12.2% had a female householder with no husband present, and 36.8% were non-families. 31.2% of all households were made up of individuals, and 14.9% had someone living alone who was 65 years of age or older. The average household size was 2.48 and the average family size was 3.12.

Ages were 30.5% under 20, 4.7% from 20 to 24, 24.9% from 25 to 44, 23.3% from 45 to 64, and 16.6% who were 65 or older. The median age was 37.9 years. The population was 46.7% male and 53.3% female.
