= Portville (village), New York =

Portville, New York
- Village
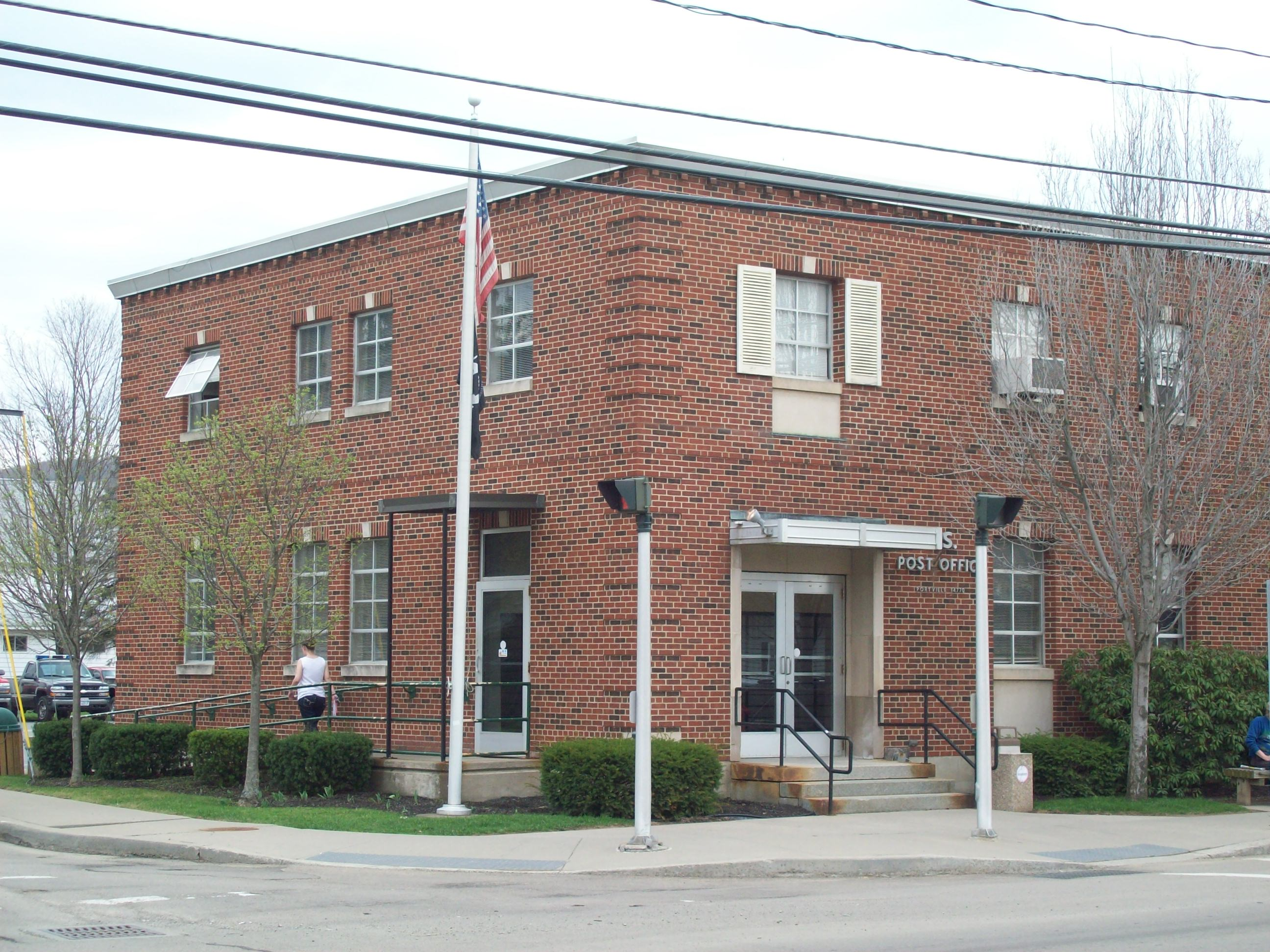
- U.S. Post Office, Portville, NY, April 2010

- Location within the state of New York
- Coordinates: 42°2′14″N 78°20′12″W
- Country: United States
- State: New York
- County: Cattaraugus
- Town: Portville

Area
  - Total: 0.80 sq mi (2.08 km^{2})
  - Land: 0.80 sq mi (2.08 km^{2})
  - Water: 0 sq mi (0.00 km^{2})
- Elevation: 1,430 ft (436 m)

Population (2020)
  - Total: 892
  - Density: 1,112/sq mi (429.4/km^{2})
- Time zone: UTC-5 (Eastern (EST))
  - Summer (DST): UTC-4 (EDT)
- ZIP code: 14770
- Area code: 716
- FIPS code: 36-59498
- GNIS feature ID: 0961005
- Website: www.portvilleny.gov

Portville is a village in Cattaraugus County, New York, United States. It is in the southern part of the town of Portville and southeast of Olean. The village population was 916 at the 2020 census, out of a population of 3,730 in the entire town of Portville.

== History ==
The community, located along the Allegheny River, was first settled in 1813, with the village of Portville being incorporated in 1895. The former Genesee Valley Canal reached its southern terminus at Portville. A fire destroyed most of the business district in 1875. The village was incorporated in 1895. Portville Free Library and William E. Wheeler House are listed on the National Register of Historic Places.

== Geography ==
According to the United States Census Bureau, the village has a total area of 0.81 square miles (2.1 km^{2}), all land. The village is on the east side of the Allegheny River and is split by Dodge Creek, which flows into the river.

New York State Route 305 and New York State Route 417 pass through the village.

== Demographics ==
Historical population
Census	Pop.	Note	%±
1870	450		—
1880	683		51.8%
1900	748		—
1910	758		1.3%
1920	606		−20.1%
1930	969		59.9%
1940	1,018		5.1%
1950	1,151		13.1%
1960	1,336		16.1%
1970	1,304		−2.4%
1980	1,136		−12.9%
1990	1,040		−8.5%
2000	1,024		−1.5%
2010	1,014		−1.0%
2020	892		−12.0%
2021 (est.)	907		1.7%
U.S. Decennial Census

As of the census of 2000, there were 1,024 people, 416 households, and 270 families residing in the village. The population density was 1,261.8 inhabitants per square mile (487.2/km^{2}). There were 454 housing units at an average density of 559.4 per square mile (216.0/km^{2}). The racial makeup of the village was 98.54% White, 0.59% Black or African American, 0.20% Native American, 0.29% from other races, and 0.39% from two or more races. Hispanic or Latino people of any race were 0.39% of the population.

There were 416 households, out of which 35.8% had children under the age of 18 living with them, 48.6% were married couples living together, 13.5% had a female householder with no husband present, and 34.9% were non-families. 32.2% of all households were made up of individuals, and 20.0% had someone living alone who was 65 years of age or older. The average household size was 2.46 and the average family size was 3.11.

In the village, the population was spread out, with 29.7% under the age of 18, 7.1% from 18 to 24, 25.1% from 25 to 44, 20.0% from 45 to 64, and 18.1% who were 65 years of age or older. The median age was 37 years. For every 100 females, there were 80.0 males. For every 100 females age 18 and over, there were 79.6 males.

The median income for a household in the village was $31,210, and the median income for a family was $40,060. Males had a median income of $30,885 versus $21,563 for females. The per capita income for the village was $16,166. About 11.1% of families and 14.8% of the population were below the poverty line, including 21.8% of those under age 18 and 13.3% of those age 65 or over.
