= Allegany (village), New York =

Allegany, New York
- Village
- Location within the state of New York
- Coordinates: 42°5′34″N 78°29′41″W
- Country: United States
- State: New York
- County: Cattaraugus
- Town: Allegany
- Incorporated (village): 1906

Area
  - Total: 0.78 sq mi (2.03 km^{2})
  - Land: 0.78 sq mi (2.01 km^{2})
  - Water: 0.0077 sq mi (0.02 km^{2})
- Elevation: 1,421 ft (433 m)

Population (2020)
  - Total: 1,544
  - Density: 1,991.2/sq mi (768.79/km^{2})
- Time zone: UTC-5 (Eastern (EST))
  - Summer (DST): UTC-4 (EDT)
- ZIP code: 14706
- Area code: 716
- FIPS code: 36-01286
- GNIS feature ID: 0942341
- Website: www.allegany.gov

Allegany is a village in Cattaraugus County, New York, United States. The population was 1,596 at the 2020 census. The village is in the eastern part of the town of Allegany, west of the city of Olean.

St. Bonaventure University is south of the village.

== History ==
The village of Allegany was incorporated in 1905. Prior to its incorporation, the area was part of the Town of Burton, established on April 18, 1831, from the Town of Great Valley. On March 28, 1851, the Town of Burton was renamed the Town of Allegany. The name "Burton" persists in the community through a longstanding bar and restaurant in the town.

== Geography ==
According to the United States Census Bureau, the village has a total area of 0.71 square miles (1.85 km^{2}), of which 0.71 square miles (1.83 km^{2}) is land and 0.008 square miles (0.02 km^{2}), or 1.01%, is water.

The village is located north of the Allegheny River, and New York State Route 417 passes through the village. The Southern Tier Expressway (Interstate 86 and New York State Route 17) bypasses the village to the north, with access from Exit 24.

== Demographics ==
Historical population
Census	Pop.	Note	%±
1850	50		—
1860	350		600.0%
1870	746		113.1%
1880	1,049		40.6%
1910	1,286		—
1920	1,350		5.0%
1930	1,411		4.5%
1940	1,436		1.8%
1950	1,738		21.0%
1960	2,064		18.8%
1970	2,050		−0.7%
1980	2,078		1.4%
1990	1,980		−4.7%
2000	1,883		−4.9%
2010	1,816		−3.6%
2020	1,596		−12.1%
2021 (est.)	1,582		−0.9%
U.S. Decennial Census

As of the census of 2000, there were 1,883 people, 753 households, and 445 families residing in the village. The population density was 2,690.2 inhabitants per square mile (1,038.7/km^{2}). There were 833 housing units at an average density of 1,190.1 per square mile (459.5/km^{2}). The racial makeup of the village was 96.55% White, 0.53% Black or African American, 0.21% Native American, 2.02% Asian, 0.05% Pacific Islander, 0.11% from other races, and 0.53% from two or more races. Hispanic or Latino of any race were 0.69% of the population.

There were 753 households, out of which 27.2% had children under the age of 18 living with them, 47.7% were married couples living together, 9.6% had a female householder with no husband present, and 40.9% were non-families. 29.7% of all households were made up of individuals, and 15.9% had someone living alone who was 65 years of age or older. The average household size was 2.38 and the average family size was 2.94.

In the village, the population was spread out, with 20.6% under the age of 18, 16.9% from 18 to 24, 20.2% from 25 to 44, 24.6% from 45 to 64, and 17.7% who were 65 years of age or older. The median age was 39 years. For every 100 females, there were 83.5 males. For every 100 females age 18 and over, there were 78.3 males.

The median income for a household in the village was $35,000, and the median income for a family was $51,354. Males had a median income of $39,844 versus $21,761 for females. The per capita income for the village was $17,306. About 6.0% of families and 18.8% of the population were below the poverty line, including 11.9% of those under age 18 and 13.0% of those age 65 or over.

== See also ==
- Allegany, New York
