= Clarksville, New York =

- Town
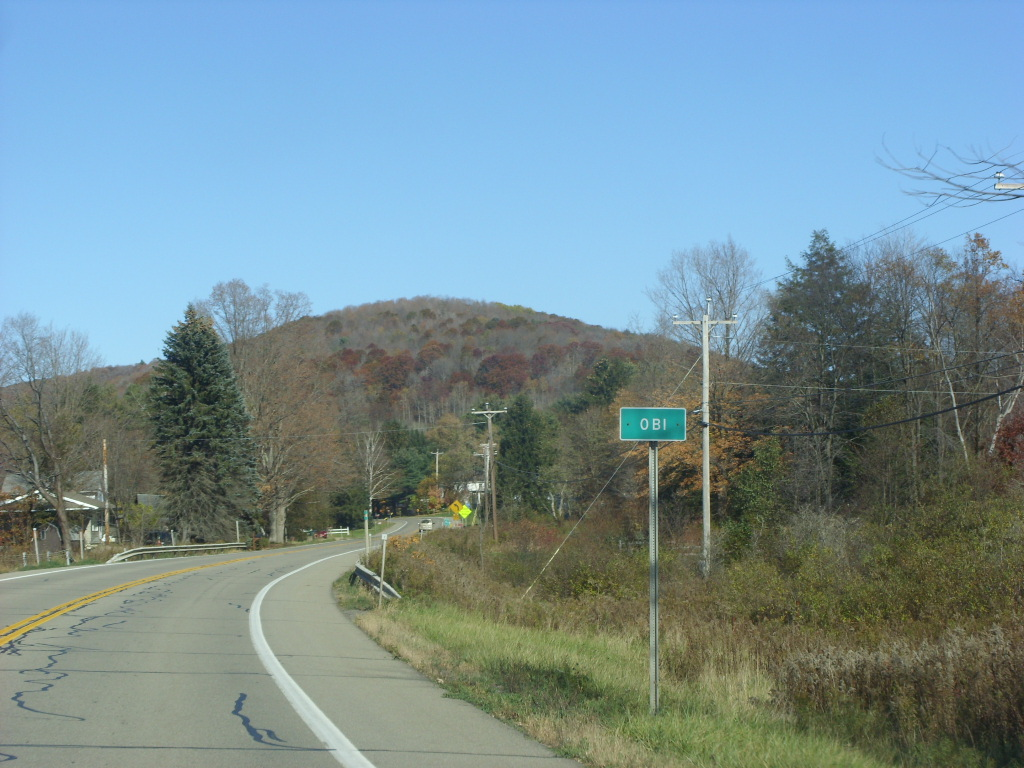
- The hamlet of Obi, as seen from New York State Route 305 in the town of Clarksville

- Location within New York Location within the United States
- Coordinates: 42°7′41″N 78°14′35″W
- Country: United States
- State: New York
- County: Allegany

Government
  - Type: Town Council
  - Town Supervisor: Ronald Truax (D, R)
  - Town Council: Members' List: • David Tavano (D, R); • Joseph Schueckler (D, R); • Brent Howard (D, R); • Eric Jones (D, R)

Area
  - Total: 36.29 sq mi (94.00 km^{2})
  - Land: 36.27 sq mi (93.95 km^{2})
  - Water: 0.019 sq mi (0.05 km^{2})

Population (2020)
  - Total: 982
  - Estimate (2021): 973
  - Density: 30.5/sq mi (11.79/km^{2})
- Time zone: Eastern (EST)
- ZIP Codes: 14715 (Bolivar); 14727 (Cuba; 14739 (Friendship); 14786 (West Clarksville)
- FIPS code: 36-003-15990

Clarksville is a town located in Allegany County, New York, United States. As of the 2020 census, the town had a total population of 982. The town is named after S.N. Clark, an agent of the Holland Land Company.

The town is in the southwest part of Allegany County, northeast of Olean.

== History ==
The first settlers arrived around 1822. The town of Clarksville was founded in 1835, taking away part of the town of Cuba.

== Geography ==
According to the United States Census Bureau, the town has a total area of 36.3 square miles (94.0 km^{2}), of which 0.02 square miles (0.05 km^{2}), or 0.06%, is water.

The west town line is the border of Cattaraugus County.

New York State Route 305 is an important north-south highway through the town.

== Demographics ==
Historical population
Census	Pop.	Note	%±
1840	326		—
1850	668		104.9%
1860	865		29.5%
1870	784		−9.4%
1880	852		8.7%
1890	891		4.6%
1900	836		−6.2%
1910	794		−5.0%
1920	770		−3.0%
1930	768		−0.3%
1940	766		−0.3%
1950	828		8.1%
1960	840		1.4%
1970	874		4.0%
1980	938		7.3%
1990	1,041		11.0%
2000	1,146		10.1%
2010	1,161		1.3%
2020	982		−15.4%
2021 (est.)	973		−0.9%
U.S. Decennial Census

As of the census of 2000, there were 1,146 people, 447 households, and 324 families residing in the town. The population density was 31.6 inhabitants per square mile (12.2/km^{2}). There were 766 housing units at an average density of 21.1 per square mile (8.1/km^{2}). The racial makeup of the town was 98.34% White, 0.17% African American, 0.26% Native American, 0.35% Asian, 0.00% Pacific Islander, 0.17% from other races, and 0.70% from two or more races. 0.17% of the population were Hispanic or Latino of any race.

There were 447 households, out of which 32.7% had children under the age of 18 living with them, 59.1% were married couples living together, 8.1% had a female householder with no husband present, and 27.3% were non-families. 20.8% of all households were made up of individuals, and 8.7% had someone living alone who was 65 years of age or older. The average household size was 2.56 and the average family size was 2.96.

In the town, the population was spread out, with 26.1% under the age of 18, 6.6% from 18 to 24, 27.4% from 25 to 44, 26.4% from 45 to 64, and 13.5% who were 65 years of age or older. The median age was 39 years. For every 100 females, there were 100.7 males. For every 100 females age 18 and over, there were 101.2 males.

The median income for a household in the town was $29,931, and the median income for a family was $35,000. Males had a median income of $29,917 versus $20,000 for females. The per capita income for the town was $13,931. 14.4% of the population and 11.1% of families were below the poverty line. 20.7% of those under the age of 18 and 10.6% of those 65 and older were living below the poverty line.

== Communities and locations in the Town of Clarksville ==
- Dodge Creek – A stream in the central part of the town, passing near West Clarksville and paralleling NY 305.
- Germantown – A location in the northwest corner of the town.
- North Clarkstown – A former location in the town.
- Obi – A hamlet on NY 305 (Obi Road) near the south town line.
- West Clarksville – A hamlet by the junction of County Route 40 (Jordan Hill Road) and NY 305 (Portville Road) near the town center.
- Wolf Creek – A stream in the west part of the town.
