= List of towns in New York =

New York towns
- Map of the 933 towns in New York
- Category: Lower-level administrative division
- Location: New York
- Created: 1788
- Number: 933
- Populations: 27 (Red House) – 793,409 (Hempstead)
- Areas: 0.9 square miles (2.3 km^{2}) (Green Island) – 484.4 square miles (1,255 km^{2}) (Webb Town)
- Government: Town government

New York counties, municipalities, and towns.

This is a list of towns in New York. As of the 2020 United States population census, the 62 counties of the State of New York are subdivided into 933 towns, 62 cities, 10 Native American reservations and one Unorganized Territory. Towns in New York are considered a third-level administrative division and a minor civil division by the US Census Bureau, in contrast to cities and villages, which are fourth-level divisions.

== Coterminous and Consolidated Town-Villages ==
Six towns are Coterminous town-villages, towns that are coterminous with one village.

- East Rochester in Monroe County
- Green Island in Albany County
- Harrison in Westchester County
- Mount Kisco in Westchester County
- Palm Tree in Orange County is coterminous with the Village of Kiryas Joel.
- Scarsdale in Westchester County

There is also one consolidated town-village

- Tuxedo in Orange County

wherein the territory of the Town of Tuxedo that is outside the Village of Tuxedo Park is incorporated as the Village of Tuxedo, but this village and the Town use the same government.

== Shared names ==
=== Same name, different county ===
There are ten pairs of towns with the same name located in separate counties:

- Albion (Orleans County) & Albion (Oswego County)
- Ashland (Chemung County) & Ashland (Greene County)
- Brighton (Franklin County) & Brighton (Monroe County)
- Chester (Orange County) & Chester (Warren County)
- Clinton (Clinton County) & Clinton (Dutchess County)
- Dickinson (Broome County) & Dickinson (Franklin County)
- Franklin (Delaware County) & Franklin (Franklin County)
- Fremont (Steuben County) & Fremont (Sullivan County)
- Greenville (Greene County) & Greenville (Orange County)
- Lewis (Essex County) & Lewis (Lewis County)

=== Towns and cities with same name ===
There are 24 towns where a city of the same name exists in the same county:

- Amsterdam town & city (Montgomery County)
- Batavia town & city (Genesee County)
- Binghamton town & city (Broome County)
- Canandaigua town & city (Ontario County)
- Corning town & city (Steuben County)
- Dunkirk town & city (Chautauqua County)
- Elmira town & city (Chemung County)
- Geneva town & city (Ontario County)
- Ithaca town & city (Tompkins County)
- Johnstown town & city (Fulton County)
- Kingston town & city (Ulster County)
- Little Falls town & city (Herkimer County)
- Lockport town & city (Niagara County)
- Newburgh town & city (Orange County)
- Norwich town & city (Chenango County)
- Olean town & city (Cattaraugus County)
- Oneonta town & city (Otsego County)
- Oswego town & city (Oswego County)
- Plattsburgh town & city (Clinton County)
- Poughkeepsie town & city (Dutchess County)
- Rye town & city (Westchester County)
- Salamanca town & city (Cattaraugus County)
- Tonawanda town & city (Erie County)
- Watertown town & city (Jefferson County)

In addition, three towns share names with cities in a different county:

- Fulton town (Schoharie County) & city (Oswego County)
- Middletown town (Delaware County) & city (Orange County)
- Rochester town (Ulster County) & city (Monroe County)

== Alphabetical list ==
Towns in New York
Town	Founded	Formed from	County	Pop. (2020)	Land (sq mi)	Water (sq mi)	Coordinates	GEO ID (FIPS code)	ANSI code (GNIS ID)
Adams	1802	Mexico	Jefferson	4,973	42.270	0.153	43.844658, -76.054289	3604500210	00978655
Addison	1796	Painted Post	Steuben	2,397	25.545	0.142	42.132164, -77.234422	3610100287	00978656
Afton	1857	Bainbridge	Chenango	2,769	45.836	0.679	42.226305, -75.526838	3601700353	00978657
Alabama	1826	Pembroke and Shelby	Genesee	1,602	42.370	0.406	43.090053, -78.366480	3603700474	00978658
Albion	1875	Barre	Orleans	7,639	25.257	0.093	43.226343, -78.209387	3607301044	00978660
Albion	1825	Richland	Oswego	2,009	47.286	0.532	43.489292, -76.030916	3607501055	00978661
Alden	1823	Clarence	Erie	9,706	34.308	0.201	42.907256, -78.520613	3602901099	00978662
Alexander	1812	Batavia	Genesee	2,491	35.467	0.096	42.920586, -78.250065	3603701165	00978663
Alexandria	1821	Brownville and Le Ray	Jefferson	3,741	72.657	11.900	44.319903, -75.878414	3604501176	00978664
Alfred	1808	Angelica	Allegany	5,157	31.476	0.149	42.233273, -77.795084	3600301209	00978665
Allegany	1831	Great Valley	Cattaraugus	7,493	70.923	0.658	42.091286, -78.531856	3600901297	00978666
Allen	1823	Angelica	Allegany	494	36.377	0.203	42.397400, -78.004345	3600301319	00978668
Alma	1854	Willing	Allegany	781	36.215	0.301	42.047668, -78.016224	3600301429	00978669
Almond	1821	Alfred	Allegany	1,512	45.717	0.067	42.340932, -77.781630	3600301451	00978670
Altona	1857	Chazy	Clinton	2,666	100.983	0.357	44.841730, -73.670487	3601901583	00978672
Amboy	1830	Williamstown	Oswego	1,245	37.049	0.692	43.377133, -75.918438	3607501649	00978673
Amenia	1788	Amenia Precinct	Dutchess	3,769	43.220	0.396	41.829938, -73.534020	3602701693	00978674
Amherst	1818	Buffalo	Erie	129,595	53.203	0.391	43.011639, -78.757148	3602902000	00978675
Amity	1830	Angelica and Scio	Allegany	2,171	34.442	0.123	42.226466, -78.003401	3600302011	00978676
Amsterdam	1793	Caughnawaga	Montgomery	5,557	29.701	0.733	42.955568, -74.166076	3605702077	00978678
Ancram	1803	Livingston	Columbia	1,440	42.478	0.259	42.035959, -73.580146	3602102099	00978679
Andes	1819	Middletown	Delaware	1,114	108.592	3.694	42.128419, -74.787370	3602502132	00978680
Andover	1824	Independence	Allegany	1,615	39.430	0.066	42.150717, -77.811105	3600302154	00978681
Angelica	1805	Leicester	Allegany	1,272	36.394	0.038	42.304028, -78.015503	3600302187	00978682
Annsville	1823	Camden, Florence, Lee and Vienna	Oneida	2,639	60.167	0.308	43.345241, -75.614699	3606502253	00978683
Antwerp	1810	Le Ray	Jefferson	1,683	106.042	2.378	44.221394, -75.601758	3604502297	00978684
Arcade	1807	Sheldon	Wyoming	4,187	47.004	0.106	42.571352, -78.369984	3612102418	00978685
Arcadia	1825	Lyons	Wayne	13,731	52.033	0.111	43.098080, -77.082687	3611702440	00978686
Argyle	1788	Argyle township	Washington	3,644	56.536	1.260	43.232135, -73.478888	3611502561	00978687
Arietta	1836	Lake Pleasant	Hamilton	292	317.178	12.229	43.500184, -74.579588	3604102572	00978688
Arkwright	1829	Pomfret and Villenova	Chautauqua	1,008	35.670	0.060	42.386656, -79.242479	3601302605	00978689
Ashford	1824	Ellicottville	Cattaraugus	1,961	51.737	0.164	42.440413, -78.646301	3600902759	00978690
Ashland	1867	Chemung, Elmira and Southport	Chemung	1,510	14.182	0.355	42.019488, -76.750371	3601502781	00978691
Ashland	1848	Prattsville and Windham	Greene	682	25.958	0.000	42.321255, -74.336110	3603902803	00978692
Athens	1815	Catskill and Coxsackie	Greene	3,916	26.246	2.622	42.276513, -73.859238	3603902913	00978693
Attica	1811	Sheldon	Wyoming	5,790	35.712	0.315	42.820640, -78.245571	3612103012	00978694
Au Sable	1839	Peru	Clinton	3,183	39.109	4.740	44.503615, -73.533466	3601903221	00978699
Augusta	1798	Whitestown	Oneida	2,021	27.728	0.000	42.977116, -75.502294	3606503155	00978696
Aurelius	1789	Aurelius township	Cayuga	2,611	30.245	1.749	42.929159, -76.668447	3601103166	00978697
Aurora/East Aurora	1818	Willink	Erie	13,943	36.393	0.046	42.738748, -78.638578	3602903199	00978698
Austerlitz	1818	Canaan, Chatham and Hillsdale	Columbia	1,625	48.722	0.092	42.315112, -73.518416	3602103287	00978700
Ava	1846	Boonville	Oneida	680	37.667	0.038	43.414296, -75.441248	3606503309	00978701
Avoca	1843	Bath, Cohocton, Howard and Wheeler	Steuben	1,990	36.249	0.041	42.424318, -77.448755	3610103342	00978702
Avon	1797		Livingston	6,939	41.203	0.055	42.897400, -77.727378	3605103364	00978703
Babylon/West Babylon	1872	Huntington	Suffolk	218,223	52.319	61.861	40.680656, -73.316175	3610304000	00978704
Bainbridge	1791		Chenango	3,060	34.323	0.433	42.296565, -75.476683	3601704044	00978705
Baldwin	1856	Chemung	Chemung	812	25.716	0.020	42.101825, -76.657096	3601504132	00978706
Ballston	1788	Ballstown district	Saratoga	11,831	29.576	0.462	42.951295, -73.887168	3609104220	00978707
Bangor	1812	Dickinson	Franklin	2,231	43.118	0.000	44.837505, -74.430139	3603304319	00978708
Barker	1831	Lisle	Broome	2,509	41.403	0.376	42.265005, -75.911308	3600704429	00978709
Barre	1818	Gaines	Orleans	1,843	55.040	0.011	43.179026, -78.211392	3607304572	00978710
Barrington	1822	Reading and Wayne	Yates	1,541	35.753	1.378	42.523012, -77.052976	3612304594	00978711
Barton	1824	Tioga	Tioga	8,609	59.275	0.414	42.079846, -76.499364	3610704671	00978712
Batavia	1802		Genesee	6,293	48.187	0.218	42.996988, -78.227989	3603704726	00978714
Bath	1796		Steuben	11,424	95.319	0.559	42.322420, -77.316574	3610104770	00978715
Bedford	1788	Bedford Patent	Westchester	17,309	37.173	2.247	41.225704, -73.664943	3611905320	00978717
Beekman	1788	Beekman Precinct	Dutchess	14,172	29.838	0.517	41.602869, -73.698370	3602705452	00978718
Beekmantown	1820	Plattsburgh	Clinton	5,508	60.425	9.202	44.788193, -73.502927	3601905485	00978719
Belfast	1824	Caneadea	Allegany	1,637	36.295	0.249	42.298023, -78.135597	3600305573	00978720
Bellmont	1833	Chateaugay	Franklin	1,327	164.141	3.019	44.760907, -74.131480	3603305716	00978721
Bennington	1818	Sheldon	Wyoming	3,235	55.049	0.215	42.817297, -78.387564	3612105936	00978722
Benson	1860	Hope and Mayfield	Hamilton	221	82.617	0.580	43.290245, -74.366257	3604105958	00978723
Benton	1803	Jerusalem	Yates	2,985	41.473	2.964	42.721950, -77.049662	3612306002	00978724
Bergen	1813	Murray	Genesee	3,120	27.559	0.036	43.096201, -77.955484	3603706057	00978725
Berkshire	1808	Union	Tioga	1,480	30.216	0.010	42.296636, -76.165659	3610706145	00978726
Berlin	1806	Petersburgh	Rensselaer	1,808	59.603	0.319	42.660802, -73.380018	3608306189	00978727
Berne	1795	Rensselaerville	Albany	2,689	64.030	0.704	42.603917, -74.130358	3600106211	00978728
Bethany	1812	Batavia	Genesee	1,780	36.035	0.035	42.919587, -78.126802	3603706266	00978729
Bethel	1809	Lumberland	Sullivan	3,959	85.265	4.693	41.689061, -74.853955	3610506310	00978730
Bethlehem	1793	Watervliet	Albany	35,034	49.030	0.834	42.585940, -73.827782	3600106354	00978731
Big Flats	1822	Elmira	Chemung	7,791	44.484	0.581	42.138490, -76.913756	3601506475	00978732
Binghamton	1855	Chenango	Broome	4,617	25.251	0.088	42.035053, -75.905551	3600706618	00978734
Birdsall	1829	Almond and Allen	Allegany	190	35.889	0.171	42.397379, -77.889195	3600306717	00978735
Black Brook	1839	Peru	Clinton	1,453	129.974	4.361	44.524426, -73.817513	3601906761	00978736
Bleecker	1831	Johnstown	Fulton	545	57.127	2.285	43.173404, -74.381782	3603506882	00978737
Blenheim	1797	Schoharie	Schoharie	308	33.933	0.461	42.488372, -74.522581	3609506893	00978738
Blooming Grove	1799	Cornwall	Orange	18,811	34.736	0.616	41.395660, -74.184287	3607107003	00978739
Bolivar	1825	Friendship	Allegany	2,029	35.863	0.010	42.034778, -78.136902	3600307201	00978740
Bolton	1799	Thurman	Warren	2,012	63.270	26.771	43.579414, -73.657631	3611307234	00978741
Bombay	1833	Fort Covington	Franklin	1,254	35.743	0.125	44.914578, -74.586536	3603307278	00978742
Boonville	1805	Leyden	Oneida	4,518	71.878	0.698	43.459155, -75.285070	3606507366	00978743
Boston	1817	Eden	Erie	7,948	35.820	0.000	42.652830, -78.755463	3602907454	00978744
Bovina	1820	Delhi, Middletown and Stamford	Delaware	658	44.263	0.232	42.273814, -74.756993	3602507597	00978745
Boylston	1828	Orwell	Oswego	498	39.152	0.021	43.657921, -75.953469	3607507674	00978746
Bradford	1836	Jersey	Steuben	806	25.122	0.114	42.330742, -77.133893	3610107740	00978747
Brandon	1828	Bangor	Franklin	628	41.255	0.067	44.735417, -74.414747	3603307839	00978748
Brant	1839	Concord and Evans	Erie	1,912	24.314	0.424	42.594817, -79.024700	3602907894	00978749
Brasher	1825	Massena	St. Lawrence	2,627	91.103	0.967	44.888187, -74.723707	3608907938	00978750
Bridgewater	1797	Sangerfield	Oneida	1,507	23.845	0.012	42.904171, -75.265132	3606508180	00978751
Brighton	1858	Duane	Franklin	1,174	77.896	5.100	44.469848, -74.247779	3603308213	00978752
Brighton	1814	Smallwood	Monroe	37,137	15.416	0.168	43.118015, -77.582070	3605508246	00978753
Bristol	1789		Ontario	2,284	36.694	0.015	42.808110, -77.425596	3606908378	00978754
Broadalbin	1793	Johnstown and Mayfield	Fulton	5,145	31.722	8.059	43.076333, -74.152367	3603508433	00978755
Brookfield	1795	Paris	Madison	2,247	77.822	0.196	42.807991, -75.343295	3605308587	00978757
Brookhaven	1788	Brookhaven Patent	Suffolk	485,773	259.439	272.097	40.857448, -72.959840	3610310000	00978758
Broome	1797	Schoharie	Schoharie	863	47.741	0.250	42.504012, -74.293643	3609510154	00978760
Brownville	1802	Leyden	Jefferson	5,842	59.132	7.320	44.026880, -76.083381	3604510242	00978761
Brunswick	1807	Troy	Rensselaer	12,581	44.347	0.280	42.749998, -73.582839	3608310275	00978762
Brutus	1802	Aurelius	Cayuga	4,314	22.106	0.394	43.045665, -76.545611	3601110297	00978763
Burke	1844	Chateaugay	Franklin	1,421	44.405	0.000	44.926169, -74.182069	3603311165	00978765
Burlington	1792	Otsego	Otsego	1,045	44.891	0.122	42.717320, -75.144624	3607711209	00978766
Burns	1826	Ossian	Allegany	1,036	27.220	0.036	42.435979, -77.781834	3600311253	00978767
Busti	1823	Ellicott and Harmony	Chautauqua	7,543	47.825	0.014	42.051324, -79.326276	3601311451	00978768
Butler	1826	Wolcott	Wayne	1,835	37.090	0.079	43.177119, -76.765002	3611711473	00978769
Butternuts	1796	Unadilla	Otsego	1,665	53.829	0.040	42.469617, -75.320901	3607711528	00978770
Byron	1820	Bergen	Genesee	2,302	32.212	0.079	43.084761, -78.066965	3603711572	00978771
Cairo	1803	Catskill, Coxsackie and Durham	Greene	6,644	59.828	0.254	42.298811, -74.015664	3603911649	00978772
Caledonia	1803	Northampton	Livingston	4,154	43.875	0.251	42.952791, -77.820303	3605111715	00978773
Callicoon	1842	Liberty	Sullivan	2,989	48.591	0.355	41.835839, -74.924132	3610511759	00978774
Cambria	1808	Willink	Niagara	5,743	39.710	0.000	43.176589, -78.820251	3606311803	00978775
Cambridge	1788	Cambridge patent	Washington	1,952	36.357	0.127	43.007825, -73.446055	3611511836	00978776
Camden	1799	Mexico	Oneida	4,787	54.013	0.141	43.345094, -75.774347	3606511858	00978777
Cameron	1822	Addison	Steuben	899	46.704	0.058	42.226656, -77.421703	3610111880	00978778
Camillus	1799	Marcellus	Onondaga	25,346	34.424	0.017	43.066596, -76.313465	3606711913	00978779
Campbell	1831	Hornby	Steuben	3,160	40.685	0.094	42.230042, -77.166427	3610111946	00978780
Canaan	1788	Kings District	Columbia	1,570	36.676	0.280	42.407900, -73.461763	3602112056	00978781
Canadice	1829	Richmond	Ontario	1,668	29.851	2.585	42.718531, -77.558586	3606912100	00978782
Canajoharie	1788	Canajoharie district	Montgomery	3,660	42.632	0.501	42.865366, -74.614882	3605712122	00978783
Canandaigua	1791		Ontario	11,109	56.796	5.735	42.861633, -77.314188	3606912155	00978785
Candor	1811	Spencer	Tioga	5,149	94.510	0.110	42.230947, -76.332452	3610712221	00978786
Caneadea	1808	Angelica	Allegany	2,294	35.649	0.693	42.393776, -78.131108	3600312243	00978787
Canisteo	1796		Steuben	3,295	54.351	0.009	42.237887, -77.535418	3610112265	00978788
Canton	1805	Lisbon	St. Lawrence	11,638	104.765	1.098	44.574414, -75.210848	3608912342	00978789
Cape Vincent	1849	Lyme	Jefferson	2,765	56.353	33.499	44.114766, -76.290981	3604512364	00978790
Carlisle	1807	Cobleskill and Sharon	Schoharie	1,768	34.124	0.128	42.740232, -74.436545	3609512452	00978791
Carlton	1822	Gaines and Ridgeway	Orleans	2,835	43.607	0.801	43.339906, -78.208493	3607312496	00978792
Carmel	1795	Frederick	Putnam	33,576	35.907	4.786	41.387098, -73.722738	3607912529	00978793
Caroga	1842	Bleecker, Johnstown and Stratford	Fulton	1,264	50.627	3.651	43.124008, -74.525070	3603512573	00978794
Caroline	1811	Spencer	Tompkins	3,334	54.763	0.130	42.357575, -76.334979	3610912606	00978795
Carroll	1825	Ellicott	Chautauqua	3,456	33.320	0.023	42.039848, -79.098719	3601312639	00978796
Carrollton	1842	Great Valley	Cattaraugus	1,207	42.299	0.041	42.056363, -78.637943	3600912661	00978797
Castile	1821	Perry	Wyoming	2,711	36.980	1.415	42.664387, -78.021835	3612112782	00978798
Catharine	1798	Newtown	Schuyler	1,651	32.295	0.605	42.337939, -76.733699	3609712914	00978799
Catlin	1823	Catharine	Chemung	2,541	37.989	0.027	42.231245, -76.895550	3601512947	00978800
Cato	1802	Aurelius	Cayuga	2,445	33.643	2.544	43.120219, -76.536757	3601112969	00978801
Caton	1839	Painted Post	Steuben	2,049	37.565	0.434	42.035747, -77.023787	3610112991	00978802
Catskill	1788	Great Imboght District	Greene	11,298	60.439	3.726	42.208688, -73.938888	3603913013	00978803
Cayuta	1824	Spencer	Schuyler	508	20.319	0.000	42.271993, -76.684886	3609713112	00978805
Cazenovia	1793	Paris and Whitestown	Madison	6,740	49.870	1.844	42.915928, -75.861962	3605313156	00978806
Centerville	1819	Pike	Allegany	929	35.435	0.047	42.474965, -78.267693	3600313475	00978807
Champion	1800	Mexico	Jefferson	4,562	44.184	0.889	43.973154, -75.706123	3604513717	00978808
Champlain	1788		Clinton	5,745	51.231	7.585	44.966280, -73.436895	3601913750	00978809
Charleston	1793	Mohawk	Montgomery	1,355	41.890	0.973	42.824767, -74.355772	3605713816	00978810
Charlotte	1829	Gerry	Chautauqua	1,527	36.432	0.000	42.304888, -79.237368	3601313860	00978811
Charlton	1792	Ballston	Saratoga	4,328	32.774	0.188	42.957874, -73.991978	3609113926	00978812
Chateaugay	1799	Champlain and Plattsburgh	Franklin	1,743	49.789	0.012	44.930509, -74.076284	3603313992	00978813
Chatham	1795	Canaan and Kinderhook	Columbia	4,104	53.227	0.316	42.425582, -73.582076	3602114014	00978814
Chautauqua	1805	Batavia	Chautauqua	4,009	67.099	0.094	42.241757, -79.506691	3601314069	00978815
Chazy	1804	Champlain	Clinton	4,096	54.153	7.163	44.856518, -73.460741	3601914113	00978816
Cheektowaga	1839	Amherst	Erie	89,877	29.423	0.063	42.910021, -78.741821	3602915011	00978817
Chemung	1788		Chemung	2,358	49.479	0.562	42.055631, -76.605721	3601515077	00978818
Chenango	1791		Broome	10,959	33.834	0.434	42.215645, -75.902254	3600715110	00978819
Cherry Creek	1829	Ellington	Chautauqua	1,037	36.632	0.013	42.302111, -79.122244	3601315198	00978820
Cherry Valley	1791	Canajoharie	Otsego	1,229	40.375	0.007	42.808922, -74.722042	3607715253	00978821
Chester	1845	Blooming Grove, Goshen, Monroe and Warwick	Orange	12,646	25.049	0.151	41.330239, -74.276925	3607115308	00978822
Chester	1799	Thurman	Warren	3,086	84.190	2.860	43.689036, -73.873783	3611315319	00978823
Chesterfield	1802	Willsboro	Essex	2,476	79.036	26.336	44.453432, -73.448719	3603115330	00978824
Chili	1822	Riga	Monroe	29,123	39.499	0.369	43.085609, -77.745242	3605515462	00978825
Cicero	1807	Lysander	Onondaga	31,435	48.274	0.191	43.172142, -76.056249	3606715704	00978826
Cincinnatus	1804	Solon	Cortland	902	25.356	0.129	42.530670, -75.913769	3602315748	00978827
Clare	1880	Pierrepont	St. Lawrence	100	96.557	0.698	44.356596, -75.013141	3608915792	00978828
Clarence	1808	Willink	Erie	32,950	53.503	0.132	43.024707, -78.645674	3602915825	00978829
Clarendon	1820	Sweden	Orleans	3,315	35.219	0.000	43.174402, -78.056338	3607315880	00978830
Clarkson	1819	Murray	Monroe	6,904	33.183	0.005	43.245062, -77.932451	3605515957	00978831
Clarkstown	1791	Haverstraw	Rockland	86,855	38.475	8.593	41.134184, -73.965733	3608715968	00978832
Clarksville	1835	Cuba	Allegany	976	36.276	0.020	42.140145, -78.247654	3600315990	00978833
Claverack	1788	Claverack District	Columbia	6,058	47.559	0.390	42.218852, -73.689931	3602116045	00978834
Clay	1827	Cicero	Onondaga	60,527	47.958	0.901	43.178698, -76.192114	3606716067	00978835
Clayton	1833	Lyme and Orleans	Jefferson	4,770	82.360	21.671	44.204326, -76.079717	3604516100	00978836
Clermont	1788	Manor of Livingston District	Columbia	2,058	17.996	1.197	42.085945, -73.854682	3602116177	00978837
Clifton	1868	Pierrepont	St. Lawrence	675	134.361	15.985	44.201398, -74.885750	3608916287	00978838
Clifton Park	1828	Halfmoon	Saratoga	38,029	48.202	2.004	42.858993, -73.822974	3609116353	00978839
Clinton	1845	Ellenburg	Clinton	652	67.070	0.030	44.937659, -73.920213	3601916397	00978840
Clinton	1788	Clinton Precinct and Rhinebeck Precinct	Dutchess	4,037	38.143	0.642	41.864288, -73.819584	3602716408	00978841
Clymer	1821	Chautauqua	Chautauqua	1,753	36.070	0.093	42.049004, -79.582437	3601316595	00978842
Cobleskill	1797	Schoharie	Schoharie	6,086	30.599	0.179	42.687506, -74.442157	3609516639	00978843
Cochecton	1828	Bethel	Sullivan	1,448	36.241	0.790	41.680039, -74.994190	3610516661	00978844
Coeymans	1791	Watervliet	Albany	7,256	50.129	3.038	42.491282, -73.875102	3600116694	00978845
Cohocton	1812	Bath and Dansville	Steuben	2,269	56.083	0.007	42.519967, -77.481566	3610116738	00978846
Colchester	1792	Middletown	Delaware	1,782	136.778	5.398	42.039868, -74.953334	3602516793	00978848
Colden	1827	Holland	Erie	3,121	35.633	0.089	42.648107, -78.646394	3602916870	00978849
Coldspring	1837	Napoli	Cattaraugus	658	51.464	0.554	42.055681, -78.844478	3600916903	00978850
Colesville	1821	Windsor	Broome	4,868	78.347	0.824	42.179510, -75.650430	3600717046	00978851
Collins	1821	Concord	Erie	5,894	47.966	0.174	42.491800, -78.868516	3602917200	00978852
Colonie	1895	Watervliet	Albany	85,590	55.943	1.900	42.743332, -73.785600	3600117343	00978853
Colton	1843	Parishville	St. Lawrence	1,530	241.702	13.252	44.368068, -74.814597	3608917409	00978854
Columbia	1812	Warren	Herkimer	1,569	35.073	0.030	42.929047, -75.046258	3604317431	00978855
Columbus	1805	Brookfield	Chenango	898	37.368	0.124	42.691555, -75.369681	3601717486	00978856
Concord	1812	Willink	Erie	8,316	69.934	0.160	42.545428, -78.702888	3602917585	00978857
Conesus	1819	Groveland and Livonia	Livingston	2,320	32.891	2.980	42.703498, -77.641047	3605117618	00978858
Conesville	1836	Broome and Durham	Schoharie	687	39.466	0.404	42.398075, -74.338293	3609517651	00978859
Conewango	1823	Little Valley	Cattaraugus	1,785	36.114	0.022	42.225426, -79.006508	3600917684	00978860
Conklin	1824	Chenango	Broome	5,008	24.385	0.504	42.040720, -75.835038	3600717772	00978861
Conquest	1821	Cato	Cayuga	1,791	35.222	1.096	43.117487, -76.656916	3601117849	00978862
Constable	1807	Malone	Franklin	1,486	32.806	0.012	44.967307, -74.280786	3603317871	00978863
Constantia	1808	Mexico	Oswego	4,778	56.765	42.915	43.258840, -75.963734	3607517904	00978864
Copake	1824	Taghkanic	Columbia	3,346	40.762	1.280	42.129680, -73.549044	3602118102	00978865
Corinth	1818	Edinburgh	Saratoga	6,500	56.763	1.372	43.228513, -73.922216	3609118223	00978866
Corning	1796		Steuben	5,983	36.850	0.503	42.149331, -77.014205	3610118267	00978868
Cornwall	1788	Cornwall Precinct	Orange	12,884	26.653	1.479	41.414179, -74.061304	3607118300	00978869
Cortlandt	1788		Westchester	42,545	39.255	10.761	41.261089, -73.902332	3611918410	00978871
Cortlandville	1829	Homer	Cortland	8,409	49.720	0.180	42.603488, -76.117640	3602318421	00978872
Coventry	1806	Greene	Chenango	1,516	48.697	0.167	42.291156, -75.629129	3601718619	00978873
Covert	1817	Ovid	Seneca	2,163	31.385	6.195	42.584405, -76.696609	3609918663	00978874
Covington	1817	Le Roy and Perry	Wyoming	1,253	26.138	0.000	42.832671, -78.014813	3612118696	00978875
Coxsackie	1788	Coxsackie District	Greene	8,382	36.865	1.548	42.345680, -73.863305	3603918729	00978876
Crawford	1823	Montgomery	Orange	9,130	40.031	0.084	41.571349, -74.315687	3607118916	00978877
Croghan	1841	Diana and Watson	Lewis	3,197	179.182	2.849	43.969084, -75.355598	3604919081	00978878
Crown Point	1788	Crown Point township	Essex	2,042	76.121	5.724	43.963848, -73.583301	3603119246	00978879
Cuba	1822	Friendship	Allegany	3,126	35.129	0.763	42.208385, -78.243639	3600319367	00978880
Cuyler	1858	Truxton	Cortland	908	43.477	0.032	42.726333, -75.936250	3602319499	00978881
Danby	1811	Spencer	Tompkins	3,421	53.553	0.222	42.332395, -76.472452	3610919620	00978882
Dannemora	1854	Beekmantown	Clinton	4,037	59.080	6.759	44.747379, -73.812971	3601919653	00978883
Dansville	1796		Steuben	1,835	48.368	0.068	42.464632, -77.661656	3610119675	00978884
Danube	1817	Minden	Herkimer	953	29.354	0.259	42.981082, -74.798257	3604319686	00978885
Darien	1832	Pembroke	Genesee	3,010	47.371	0.219	42.908718, -78.382071	3603719719	00978886
Davenport	1817	Kortright and Meredith	Delaware	2,955	51.563	0.350	42.454193, -74.902857	3602519763	00978887
Day	1819	Edinburg and Hadley	Saratoga	819	64.112	5.420	43.321068, -74.027621	3609119807	00978888
Dayton	1835	Perrysburg	Cattaraugus	1,690	35.527	0.618	42.376833, -78.995439	3600919840	00978889
De Kalb	1806	Oswegatchie	St. Lawrence	2,375	82.523	0.684	44.475880, -75.365448	3608920038	00978893
De Peyster	1825	DeKalb and Oswegatchie	St. Lawrence	1,023	42.927	2.169	44.535363, -75.458682	3608920335	00978898
DeRuyter	1798	Cazenovia	Madison	1,276	30.440	0.833	42.769678, -75.847084	3605320401	00978900
DeWitt (De Witt)	1835	Manlius	Onondaga	26,074	33.774	0.092	43.053891, -76.071795	3606720478	00978901
Decatur	1808	Worcester	Otsego	374	20.562	0.197	42.657096, -74.705713	3607719895	00978890
Deerfield	1798	Schuyler	Oneida	3,983	32.941	0.107	43.185088, -75.151134	3606519928	00978891
Deerpark	1798	Mamakating	Orange	7,509	66.502	1.452	41.442383, -74.656826	3607119961	00978892
Delaware	1869	Cochecton	Sullivan	2,203	34.941	0.703	41.754935, -75.000363	3610520104	00978894
Delhi	1798	Kortright, Middletown and Walton	Delaware	4,795	64.198	0.401	42.272354, -74.907546	3602520137	00978895
Denmark	1807	Harrisburg	Lewis	2,626	50.602	0.446	43.898222, -75.631239	3604920214	00978896
Denning	1849	Shandaken	Ulster	493	105.666	0.099	41.955487, -74.482306	3611120247	00978897
Deposit	1880	Tompkins	Delaware	1,427	43.015	1.564	42.095846, -75.369813	3602520357	00978899
Diana	1830	Watson	Lewis	1,610	137.094	3.738	44.108159, -75.372574	3604920555	00978902
Dickinson	1890	Binghamton	Broome	5100	4.772	0.105	42.130568, -75.918054	3600720588	00978903
Dickinson	1809	Malone	Franklin	965	44.224	0.089	44.728144, -74.539700	3603320610	00978904
Dix	1835	Catlin	Schuyler	3,757	36.258	0.454	42.334430, -76.899210	3609720676	00978905
Dover	1807	Pawling	Dutchess	8,415	55.190	1.149	41.679141, -73.568762	3602720819	00978906
Dresden	1822	Fort Ann	Washington	537	52.254	2.745	43.590870, -73.468547	3611520885	00978907
Dryden	1803	Ulysses	Tompkins	13,905	93.640	0.690	42.478745, -76.362347	3610920962	00978908
Duane	1828	Malone	Franklin	180	74.952	3.032	44.600715, -74.232730	3603320973	00978909
Duanesburg	1789	Schoharie	Schenectady	5,863	70.782	1.250	42.777998, -74.172702	3609321006	00978910
Dunkirk	1859	Pomfret	Chautauqua	1,240	6.228	0.054	42.469490, -79.320099	3601321116	00978912
Durham	1790	Coxsackie	Greene	2,627	49.314	0.041	42.373601, -74.153148	3603921204	00978913
Eagle	1817	Arcade	Wyoming	1,105	36.283	0.187	42.564549, -78.254056	3612121369	00978914
East Bloomfield	1789		Ontario	3,640	33.195	0.139	42.899446, -77.422374	3606921699	00978915
East Fishkill	1849	Fishkill	Dutchess	29,707	56.503	0.883	41.561643, -73.787605	3602721996	00978917
East Greenbush	1855	Greenbush	Rensselaer	16,748	24.020	0.274	42.605098, -73.700320	3608322117	00978918
East Hampton	1788	East Hampton Patent	Suffolk	28,385	74.328	312.224	41.092293, -72.105673	3610322194	00978919
East Otto	1854	Otto	Cattaraugus	974	40.070	0.326	42.408377, -78.743584	3600922678	00978921
East Rochester	1981	Penfield, Perinton and Pittsford	Monroe	6,334	1.325	0.004	43.112210, -77.487176	3605522870	00978922
Eastchester	1788		Westchester	34,641	4.853	0.088	40.953067, -73.813316	3611921820	00978916
Easton	1789	Saratoga and Stillwater	Washington	2,279	62.304	0.934	43.029661, -73.535868	3611522656	00978920
Eaton	1807	Hamilton	Madison	4,284	44.622	0.949	42.890200, -75.630077	3605323305	00978923
Eden	1812	Willink	Erie	7,573	39.790	0.069	42.655012, -78.880010	3602923415	00978924
Edinburg	1801	Providence	Saratoga	1,333	60.169	6.925	43.223115, -74.069902	3609123591	00978925
Edmeston	1808	Burlington	Otsego	1,907	44.297	0.084	42.722913, -75.260270	3607723613	00978926
Edwards	1827	Fowler	St. Lawrence	1,015	50.471	0.831	44.286726, -75.280789	3608923646	00978927
Elba	1820	Batavia	Genesee	2,164	35.649	0.043	43.093340, -78.171240	3603723756	00978928
Elbridge	1829	Camillus	Onondaga	5,476	37.539	0.756	43.052639, -76.437331	3606723800	00978929
Elizabethtown	1798	Crown Point	Essex	1,203	81.633	1.477	44.191221, -73.650223	3603123833	00978930
Ellenburg	1830	Mooers	Clinton	1,842	106.567	0.890	44.811802, -73.864913	3601923921	00978931
Ellery	1821	Chautauqua	Chautauqua	4,122	47.454	0.117	42.189926, -79.353553	3601323976	00978932
Ellicott	1812	Pomfret	Chautauqua	8,768	30.449	0.024	42.133033, -79.231506	3601323998	00978933
Ellicottville	1820	Ischua	Cattaraugus	1,315	45.095	0.093	42.307754, -78.643656	3600924031	00978934
Ellington	1824	Gerry	Chautauqua	1,497	36.545	0.014	42.220261, -79.120588	3601324053	00978935
Ellisburg	1803	Mexico	Jefferson	3,352	85.146	1.419	43.747325, -76.113151	3604524086	00978936
Elma	1857	Aurora and Lancaster	Erie	11,721	34.517	0.011	42.828313, -78.647604	3602924130	00978937
Elmira	1792	Chemung	Chemung	6,848	22.212	0.329	42.090471, -76.775621	3601524240	00978939
Enfield	1821	Ulysses	Tompkins	3,362	36.732	0.104	42.441736, -76.620542	3610924548	00978940
Ephratah	1827	Palatine	Fulton	1,677	39.170	0.277	43.037432, -74.561468	3603524603	00978941
Erin	1822	Chemung	Chemung	1,806	44.247	0.221	42.184078, -76.671706	3601524636	00978942
Erwin	1826	Painted Post	Steuben	8,095	38.656	0.501	42.134822, -77.152700	3610124647	00978943
Esopus	1811	Kingston	Ulster	9,548	37.312	4.628	41.833329, -73.985378	3611124691	00978944
Esperance	1846	Schoharie	Schoharie	1,806	19.666	0.371	42.751864, -74.316177	3609524724	00978945
Essex	1805	Willsboro	Essex	621	31.631	5.969	44.280005, -73.397080	3603124768	00978946
Evans	1821	Eden	Erie	15,308	41.530	0.032	42.654716, -79.004985	3602924801	00978947
Exeter	1799	Richfield	Otsego	845	32.078	0.615	42.798940, -75.077522	3607724845	00978948
Fabius	1798	Pompey	Onondaga	2,006	46.497	0.275	42.819749, -75.985163	3606724878	00978949
Fairfield	1796	Norway	Herkimer	1,475	41.296	0.162	43.131120, -74.937983	3604324933	00978950
Fallsburg	1826	Neversink and Thompson	Sullivan	14,192	77.622	1.488	41.736992, -74.603756	3610525241	00978951
Farmersville	1821	Ischua	Cattaraugus	1,073	47.833	0.138	42.384220, -78.405914	3600925340	00978952
Farmington	1789		Ontario	14,170	39.430	0.000	42.989455, -77.308679	3606925406	00978953
Fayette	1800	Romulus	Seneca	3,657	54.819	11.583	42.842874, -76.858550	3609925505	00978954
Fenner	1823	Cazenovia and Smithfield	Madison	1,668	31.074	0.048	42.974926, -75.773344	3605325593	00978955
Fenton	1855	Chenango	Broome	6,429	32.773	0.592	42.201492, -75.803310	3600725604	00978956
Fine	1849	Pierrepont and Russell	St. Lawrence	1,304	166.799	2.618	44.154272, -75.085765	3608925791	00978957
Fishkill	1788	Rombout Precinct	Dutchess	24,226	27.336	4.655	41.515512, -73.923762	3602725978	00978958
Fleming	1823	Aurelius	Cayuga	2,477	21.819	2.480	42.874450, -76.577616	3601126231	00978959
Florence	1805	Camden	Oneida	1,284	54.922	0.094	43.418917, -75.739740	3606526297	00978960
Florida	1793	Mohawk	Montgomery	2,667	50.132	1.274	42.894991, -74.201025	3605726308	00978961
Floyd	1796	Steuben	Oneida	3,733	34.616	0.175	43.239952, -75.324083	3606526385	00978962
Forestburgh	1837	Mamakating and Thompson	Sullivan	808	54.781	1.532	41.561802, -74.709618	3610526528	00978963
Forestport	1869	Remsen	Oneida	1,477	76.915	1.985	43.496073, -75.147819	3606526627	00978964
Fort Ann	1788	Westfield township	Washington	5,812	108.999	1.780	43.460929, -73.529859	3611526715	00978965
Fort Covington	1817	Constable	Franklin	1,531	36.734	0.000	44.950102, -74.489629	3603326737	00978966
Fort Edward	1818	Argyle and Greenwich	Washington	5,991	26.630	0.796	43.230604, -73.559186	3611526781	00978967
Fowler	1816	Rossie and Russell	St. Lawrence	2,142	59.325	1.368	44.275595, -75.403237	3608927100	00978968
Frankfort	1796	German Flatts	Herkimer	7,011	36.421	0.106	43.040732, -75.136940	3604327199	00978969
Franklin	1793	Harpersfield	Delaware	2,288	81.249	0.278	42.330395, -75.110553	3602527232	00978970
Franklin	1836	Bellmont	Franklin	1,150	169.827	5.395	44.520107, -74.069770	3603327243	00978971
Franklinville	1812	Olean	Cattaraugus	2,802	51.812	0.173	42.304423, -78.497988	3600927342	00978972
Freedom	1820	Ischua	Cattaraugus	2,261	40.987	0.329	42.471187, -78.377562	3600927441	00978973
Freetown	1818	Cincinnatus	Cortland	767	25.486	0.142	42.520267, -76.023217	3602327496	00978974
Fremont	1854	Dansville, Hornellsville, Howard and Wayland	Steuben	894	32.036	0.154	42.394696, -77.610140	3610127551	00978975
Fremont	1851	Callicoon	Sullivan	1,161	50.186	1.046	41.873711, -75.033526	3610527573	00978976
French Creek	1829	Clymer	Chautauqua	1,007	36.259	0.020	42.041719, -79.711489	3601327606	00978977
Friendship	1815	Caneadea	Allegany	1,944	36.215	0.013	42.214944, -78.130551	3600327705	00978978
Fulton	1828	Middleburgh	Schoharie	1,199	64.978	0.027	42.589134, -74.451470	3609527826	00978980
Gaines	1816	Ridgeway	Orleans	3,226	34.419	0.040	43.275759, -78.198050	3607327958	00978981
Gainesville	1814	Warsaw	Wyoming	2,009	35.570	0.138	42.650692, -78.125147	3612127980	00978982
Galen	1812	Junius	Wayne	4,415	59.477	0.581	43.065096, -76.880324	3611728013	00978983
Gallatin	1830	Ancram	Columbia	1,628	39.111	0.521	42.060607, -73.713148	3602128068	00978984
Galway	1788	Ballston	Saratoga	3,525	43.824	1.180	43.032192, -74.032079	3609128112	00978985
Gardiner	1853	Denning, New Paltz and Rochester	Ulster	5,610	43.435	0.510	41.691551, -74.188198	3611128255	00978986
Gates	1802		Monroe	29,167	15.200	0.082	43.150766, -77.713533	3605528442	00978987
Geddes	1848	Salina	Onondaga	17,088	9.156	3.104	43.076667, -76.224544	3606728519	00978988
Genesee	1830	Cuba	Allegany	1,633	36.239	0.048	42.045172, -78.248301	3600328563	00978989
Genesee Falls	1846	Pike and Portage	Wyoming	402	15.615	0.086	42.572554, -78.063441	3612128596	00978990
Geneseo	1789		Livingston	10,234	43.944	1.198	42.806633, -77.779568	3605128629	00978991
Geneva	1872	Seneca	Ontario	3,473	19.091	0.007	42.833325, -77.005486	3606928651	00978993
Genoa	1789		Cayuga	1,815	39.598	3.565	42.654397, -76.572265	3601128673	00978994
Georgetown	1815	DeRuyter	Madison	648	40.078	0.099	42.786643, -75.743698	3605328695	00978995
German	1806	DeRuyter	Chenango	308	28.408	0.031	42.503771, -75.824223	3601728739	00978996
German Flatts	1788	Kingsland District	Herkimer	12,263	33.695	0.499	42.987513, -74.983679	3604328750	00978997
Germantown	1788	German Camp (East Camp) District	Columbia	1,936	12.103	1.819	42.136779, -73.870489	3602128772	00978998
Gerry	1812	Pomfret	Chautauqua	1,782	36.125	0.018	42.218376, -79.240020	3601328838	00978999
Ghent	1818	Chatham, Claverack and Kinderhook	Columbia	5,303	45.132	0.268	42.314987, -73.649029	3602128871	00979000
Gilboa	1848	Blenheim and Broome	Schoharie	1,111	57.800	1.576	42.431126, -74.454342	3609528981	00979001
Glen	1823	Charleston	Montgomery	2,536	38.620	0.706	42.900899, -74.351214	3605729047	00979002
Glenville	1820	Schenectady	Schenectady	29,326	49.186	1.490	42.888252, -73.988700	3609329366	00979005
Gorham	1789		Ontario	4,106	48.854	4.315	42.797135, -77.197164	3606929531	00979007
Goshen	1788	Goshen Precinct	Orange	14,571	43.642	0.290	41.381005, -74.352471	3607129553	00979008
Gouverneur	1810	Oswegatchie	St. Lawrence	6,551	71.217	1.074	44.355092, -75.489810	3608929608	00979009
Grafton	1807	Petersburgh and Troy	Rensselaer	2,051	44.721	1.241	42.764501, -73.456397	3608329674	00979010
Granby	1818	Hannibal and Lysander	Oswego	6,520	44.713	1.730	43.289808, -76.441694	3607529729	00979011
Grand Island	1852	Tonawanda	Erie	21,389	28.273	5.020	43.017901, -78.962657	3602929828	00979012
Granger	1838	Grove	Allegany	519	31.938	0.100	42.479746, -78.011050	3600329905	00979013
Granville	1788	Granville township	Washington	6,215	55.618	0.500	43.422001, -73.306019	3611530037	00979014
Great Valley	1818	Olean	Cattaraugus	1,991	49.635	0.036	42.200337, -78.637510	3600930257	00979015
Greece	1822	Gates	Monroe	96,926	47.518	3.875	43.250347, -77.700518	3605530290	00979016
Green Island	1896	Watervliet	Albany	2,934	0.747	0.186	42.747870, -73.692595	3600130532	00979020
Greenburgh	1788		Westchester	95,397	30.309	5.805	41.029573, -73.842741	3611930367	00979017
Greene	1798	Jericho and Union	Chenango	5,296	75.077	0.542	42.308164, -75.753974	3601730422	00979018
Greenfield	1793	Ballston and Saratoga	Saratoga	8,004	67.388	0.299	43.137999, -73.872299	3609130444	00979019
Greenport	1837	Hudson	Columbia	4,473	18.607	1.880	42.230076, -73.795559	3602130565	00979021
Greenville	1803	Coxsackie and Freehold	Greene	3,741	38.788	0.296	42.397012, -74.014683	3603930620	00979022
Greenville	1853	Minisink	Orange	4,689	30.015	0.484	41.373315, -74.599045	3607130631	00979023
Greenwich	1803	Argyle	Washington	4,868	43.663	0.598	43.147517, -73.475886	3611530686	00979024
Greenwood	1827	Canisteo and Troupsburg	Steuben	777	41.339	0.007	42.147107, -77.662020	3610130741	00979025
Greig	1828	Watson	Lewis	1,179	93.011	1.354	43.697077, -75.194701	3604930796	00979026
Groton	1817	Locke	Tompkins	5,746	49.406	0.133	42.583430, -76.359860	3610930972	00979027
Grove	1827	Nunda	Allegany	489	33.366	0.335	42.479522, -77.893852	3600330994	00979028
Groveland	1789		Livingston	2,316	39.129	0.725	42.709642, -77.768727	3605131016	00979029
Guilderland	1803	Watervliet	Albany	36,848	57.902	0.885	42.706657, -73.962280	3600131104	00979030
Guilford	1813	Oxford	Chenango	2,741	61.716	0.244	42.402046, -75.450687	3601731148	00979031
Hadley	1801	Greenfield and Northumberland	Saratoga	1,976	39.705	1.380	43.337476, -73.905955	3609131269	00979032
Hague	1807	Bolton	Warren	633	63.760	15.859	43.690560, -73.549746	3611331335	00979033
Halcott	1851	Lexington	Greene	249	23.041	0.000	42.220267, -74.476398	3603931379	00979034
Halfmoon	1788	Halfmoon district	Saratoga	25,662	32.580	1.050	42.860715, -73.730728	3609131489	00979035
Hamburg	1812	Willink	Erie	60,085	41.321	0.028	42.739160, -78.857134	3602931654	00979036
Hamden	1825	Delhi and Walton	Delaware	1,137	59.930	0.269	42.201381, -74.981064	3602531698	00979037
Hamilton	1795	Paris	Madison	6,379	41.339	0.116	42.792526, -75.489362	3605331720	00979038
Hamlin	1852	Clarkson	Monroe	8,725	43.468	1.122	43.322306, -77.919742	3605531797	00979039
Hammond	1827	Morristown and Rossie	St. Lawrence	1,258	62.197	15.709	44.438757, -75.726453	3608931841	00979040
Hampton	1788	Hampton township	Washington	857	22.242	0.348	43.551067, -73.290832	3611531885	00979041
Hamptonburgh	1830	Blooming Grove, Goshen and Montgomery	Orange	5,489	26.758	0.211	41.449335, -74.244749	3607131907	00979042
Hancock	1806	Colchester	Delaware	2,764	158.822	2.994	41.956369, -75.182164	3602531951	00979043
Hannibal	1806	Lysander	Oswego	4,525	44.655	0.171	43.310917, -76.549843	3607532028	00979044
Hanover	1812	Pomfret	Chautauqua	6,972	49.178	0.284	42.488023, -79.120703	3601332050	00979045
Hardenburgh	1859	Denning and Shandaken	Ulster	221	80.787	0.235	42.049037, -74.621147	3611132116	00979046
Harford	1845	Virgil	Cortland	876	24.152	0.023	42.437149, -76.206229	3602332160	00979047
Harmony	1816	Chautauqua	Chautauqua	2,121	45.400	0.161	42.049553, -79.458099	3601332248	00979048
Harpersfield	1788		Delaware	1,442	42.021	0.267	42.448423, -74.703743	3602532281	00979049
Harrietstown	1841	Duane	Franklin	5,254	196.866	16.814	44.218046, -74.206563	3603332314	00979050
Harrisburg	1803	Champion, Lowville and Mexico	Lewis	480	39.882	0.028	43.836648, -75.665737	3604932358	00979051
Harrison	1788		Westchester	28,218	16.766	0.603	41.026444, -73.723707	3611932413	00979052
Hartford	1793	Westfield	Washington	2,193	43.384	0.105	43.355737, -73.413156	3611532457	00979053
Hartland	1812	Cambria	Niagara	3,874	52.378	0.037	43.258139, -78.554677	3606332490	00979054
Hartsville	1844	Hornellsville	Steuben	558	36.143	0.056	42.222372, -77.660191	3610132567	00979055
Hartwick	1802	Otsego	Otsego	1,952	40.082	0.342	42.643462, -75.016771	3607732589	00979056
Hastings	1825	Constantia	Oswego	9,342	45.645	0.352	43.320387, -76.156606	3607532688	00979057
Haverstraw	1788	Haverstraw Precinct	Rockland	39,087	22.155	5.260	41.202899, -74.039051	3608732765	00979058
Hebron	1788	Hebron township	Washington	1,786	56.108	0.310	43.258464, -73.349096	3611533040	00979059
Hector	1802	Ovid	Schuyler	4,895	102.369	10.214	42.463533, -76.783953	3609733073	00979060
Hempstead	1788	South Hempstead Patent	Nassau	793,409	118.587	73.000	40.633959, -73.609100	3605934000	00979061
Henderson	1806	Ellisburg	Jefferson	1,438	41.180	11.756	43.855211, -76.180197	3604534055	00979062
Henrietta	1818	Pittsford	Monroe	47,096	35.351	0.296	43.054319, -77.640100	3605534099	00979063
Herkimer	1788	German Flatts Precinct	Herkimer	9,566	31.662	0.566	43.061160, -75.000618	3604334132	00979064
Hermon	1830	De Kalb and Edwards	St. Lawrence	1,074	53.15	1.08	44.466944, -75.229167	3608934176	00979065
Highland	1853	Lumberland	Sullivan	2,196	50.056	1.867	41.567366, -74.886519	3610534473	00979066
Highlands	1872	Cornwall	Orange	12,939	30.410	3.060	41.369865, -74.005885	3607134550	00979067
Hillsdale	1788	Hillsdale District	Columbia	1,831	47.724	0.164	42.229282, -73.521482	3602134748	00979068
Hinsdale	1820	Olean	Cattaraugus	2,113	38.731	0.042	42.166750, -78.372348	3600934946	00979069
Holland	1818	Willink	Erie	3,281	35.790	0.036	42.670462, -78.524234	3602935122	00979070
Homer	1794		Cortland	6,293	50.195	0.461	42.662050, -76.170167	3602335287	00979071
Hoosick	1788	Hoosick district	Rensselaer	6,711	63.032	0.113	42.876802, -73.351525	3608335463	00979072
Hope	1818	Wells	Hamilton	413	40.703	0.933	43.323352, -74.234765	3604135496	00979073
Hopewell	1822	Gorham	Ontario	3,931	35.676	0.020	42.893493, -77.195885	3606935551	00979074
Hopkinton	1805	Massena	St. Lawrence	1,105	185.340	1.704	44.536665, -74.661131	3608935595	00979075
Horicon	1838	Bolton and Hague	Warren	1,471	65.767	6.100	43.718094, -73.706078	3611335639	00979076
Hornby	1826	Painted Post	Steuben	1,684	40.850	0.038	42.239541, -77.026669	3610135661	00979077
Hornellsville	1820	Canisteo	Steuben	4,034	43.325	0.216	42.334445, -77.677087	3610135683	00979079
Horseheads	1835	Chemung and Elmira	Chemung	19,374	35.606	0.314	42.157711, -76.778875	3601535705	00979080
Hounsfield	1806	Watertown	Jefferson	3,281	48.915	71.488	43.908879, -76.307152	3604535782	00979081
Howard	1812	Bath and Dansville	Steuben	1,389	60.546	0.220	42.338600, -77.514480	3610135837	00979082
Hume	1822	Pike	Allegany	2,073	37.890	0.431	42.482162, -78.121765	3600336112	00979084
Humphrey	1836	Burton	Cattaraugus	703	37.136	0.017	42.231079, -78.497261	3600936123	00979085
Hunter	1813	Windham	Greene	3,035	90.419	0.322	42.165514, -74.152362	3603936178	00979086
Huntington	1788	Huntington Patent	Suffolk	204,127	94.123	42.988	40.884089, -73.376761	3610337000	00979087
Hurley	1788	Hurley Precinct	Ulster	6,178	29.911	6.056	41.958860, -74.122769	3611137143	00979088
Huron	1826	Wolcott	Wayne	1,872	39.392	3.710	43.246559, -76.895091	3611737165	00979089
Hyde Park	1821	Clinton	Dutchess	21,021	36.663	3.195	41.813313, -73.895463	3602737209	00979090
Independence	1821	Alfred	Allegany	1,085	34.484	0.005	42.043602, -77.794465	3600337297	00979091
Indian Lake	1858	Gilman, Long Lake and Wells	Hamilton	1,363	251.800	14.439	43.806379, -74.417665	3604137374	00979092
Inlet	1901	Morehouse	Hamilton	355	62.195	4.176	43.721790, -74.714836	3604137495	00979093
Ira	1821	Cato	Cayuga	2,142	34.795	0.103	43.209261, -76.530923	3601137660	00979094
Irondequoit	1839	Brighton	Monroe	51,043	15.001	1.833	43.209811, -77.572056	3605537726	00979095
Ischua	1846	Hinsdale	Cattaraugus	736	32.377	0.021	42.237873, -78.384533	3600937825	00979096
Islip	1788	Precincts of Islip	Suffolk	339,938	104.114	58.891	40.712577, -73.195524	3610338000	00979097
Italy	1815	Naples	Yates	1,099	40.140	0.122	42.618889, -77.312149	3612338044	00979098
Ithaca	1821	Ulysses	Tompkins	22,283	28.946	1.340	42.413898, -76.540186	3610938088	00979100
Jackson	1815	Cambridge	Washington	1,723	37.160	0.406	43.080457, -73.383276	3611538143	00979101
Jasper	1837	Canisteo and Troupsburg	Steuben	1,418	52.644	0.023	42.144268, -77.531889	3610138319	00979103
Java	1832	China	Wyoming	1,972	47.128	0.202	42.651832, -78.386663	3612138341	00979104
Jay	1798	Willsboro	Essex	2,486	67.688	0.421	44.377625, -73.696474	3603138396	00979105
Jefferson	1803	Blenheim	Schoharie	1,333	43.251	0.163	42.489666, -74.607360	3609538440	00979106
Jerusalem	1789		Yates	4,405	58.639	6.762	42.612928, -77.157943	3612338583	00979107
Jewett	1849	Hunter and Lexington	Greene	879	50.323	0.199	42.237830, -74.231016	3603938638	00979108
Johnsburg	1805	Thurman	Warren	2,143	203.976	2.768	43.657786, -74.065037	3611338715	00979109
Johnstown	1793	Caughnawaga	Fulton	6,867	70.214	1.082	43.044322, -74.398332	3603538792	00979111
Junius	1803	Fayette	Seneca	1,388	26.709	0.145	42.971850, -76.908841	3609938858	00979112
Keene	1808	Elizabethtown and Jay	Essex	1,144	155.941	0.676	44.122758, -73.883516	3603139067	00979113
Kendall	1837	Murray	Orleans	2,617	32.857	0.061	43.329114, -78.051662	3607339188	00979114
Kent	1788	Fredericksburgh Patent	Putnam	12,900	40.504	2.822	41.459239, -73.725148	3607939331	00979740
Kiantone	1853	Carroll	Chautauqua	1,397	18.397	0.140	42.027070, -79.193096	3601339507	00979115
Kinderhook	1788	Kinderhook District	Columbia	8,330	31.806	0.607	42.411289, -73.682656	3602139573	00979116
Kingsbury	1788	Kingsbury township	Washington	12,968	39.678	0.327	43.335201, -73.551426	3611539650	00979117
Kingston	1788	Kingston Township	Ulster	933	7.702	0.048	41.978144, -74.038662	3611139738	00979119
Kirkland	1827	Paris	Oneida	10,075	33.783	0.051	43.036731, -75.384504	3606539804	00979120
Kirkwood	1859	Conklin	Broome	5,481	30.795	0.397	42.091575, -75.799360	3600739837	00979121
Knox	1822	Berne	Albany	2,635	41.762	0.174	42.685353, -74.105633	3600140002	00979122
Kortright	1793	Harpersfield	Delaware	1,544	62.451	0.182	42.402723, -74.781344	3602540068	00979123
LaFayette	1825	Onondaga and Pompey	Onondaga	4,910	39.233	0.413	42.907651, -76.103328	3606740266	00979125
LaGrange (La Grange)	1821	Beekman and Fishkill	Dutchess	15,975	39.879	0.470	41.684927, -73.795750	3602740299	00979126
Lake George	1810	Bolton, Queensbury and Thurman	Warren	3,502	30.069	2.549	43.435002, -73.720924	3611340519	00979127
Lake Luzerne	1792	Queensbury	Warren	3,079	52.519	1.540	43.345954, -73.789719	3611340662	00979128
Lake Pleasant	1812	Johnstown	Hamilton	897	187.984	10.000	43.578905, -74.424033	3604140794	00979129
Lancaster	1833	Clarence	Erie	45,106	37.703	0.234	42.910914, -78.632214	3602941146	00979130
Lansing	1817	Genoa	Tompkins	11,565	60.490	9.452	42.566527, -76.531984	3610941234	00979131
Lapeer	1845	Virgil	Cortland	795	25.039	0.143	42.455992, -76.112211	3602341300	00979132
Laurens	1810	Otsego	Otsego	2,311	42.049	0.119	42.535705, -75.118079	3607741531	00979133
Lawrence	1828	Brasher and Hopkinton	St. Lawrence	1,715	47.610	0.058	44.745606, -74.676345	3608941564	00979134
Le Ray	1806	Brownville	Jefferson	25,574	73.643	0.361	44.078729, -75.795815	3604542015	00979141
Le Roy	1812	Caledonia	Genesee	7,662	42.084	0.090	42.992655, -77.966199	3603742037	00979142
Lebanon	1807	Hamilton	Madison	1,326	43.344	0.336	42.780128, -75.626215	3605341674	00979135
Ledyard	1823	Scipio	Cayuga	1,655	36.112	12.469	42.745344, -76.674047	3601141740	00979136
Lee	1811	Western	Oneida	6,171	45.106	0.447	43.325161, -75.518579	3606541762	00979137
Leicester	1802		Livingston	2,082	33.929	0.004	42.760288, -77.904502	3605141883	00979138
Lenox	1809	Sullivan	Madison	8,768	36.243	0.023	43.111571, -75.756992	3605341905	00979139
Leon	1832	Conewango	Cattaraugus	1,244	36.182	0.027	42.300481, -79.001361	3600941982	00979140
Lewis	1805	Willsboro	Essex	1,293	84.790	0.210	44.318369, -73.581246	3603142114	00979143
Lewis	1852	Leyden and West Turin	Lewis	844	64.607	0.542	43.490911, -75.558906	3604942125	00979144
Lewisboro	1788		Westchester	12,265	27.746	1.416	41.266160, -73.588251	3611942136	00979145
Lewiston	1818	Cambria	Niagara	15,944	37.121	4.010	43.184149, -78.951416	3606342158	00979146
Lexington	1813	Windham	Greene	770	79.686	0.037	42.209047, -74.333452	3603942202	00979147
Leyden	1797	Steuben	Lewis	1,572	33.330	0.222	43.534488, -75.382362	3604942213	00979148
Liberty	1807	Lumberland	Sullivan	10,159	79.579	1.158	41.811822, -74.779789	3610542235	00979149
Lima	1789		Livingston	4,154	31.891	0.053	42.895889, -77.608672	3605142334	00979150
Lincklaen	1823	German	Chenango	361	26.263	0.011	42.677344, -75.843763	3601742411	00979151
Lincoln	1896	Lenox	Madison	1,802	24.999	0.059	43.032236, -75.733805	3605342422	00979152
Lindley	1837	Erwin	Steuben	1,813	37.597	0.271	42.037857, -77.148523	3610142576	00979153
Lisbon	1801		St. Lawrence	4,221	108.280	5.636	44.696518, -75.305716	3608942631	00979154
Lisle	1801	Union	Broome	2,691	46.894	0.090	42.379304, -76.055997	3600742653	00979155
Litchfield	1796	German Flatts	Herkimer	1,444	29.992	0.061	42.967722, -75.163817	3604342664	00979156
Little Falls	1829	Herkimer	Herkimer	1,497	22.340	0.163	43.018379, -74.894737	3604342752	00979158
Little Valley	1818	Perry	Cattaraugus	1,675	29.787	0.006	42.224471, -78.759228	3600942840	00979159
Livingston	1788	Manor of Livingston District	Columbia	3,628	38.163	0.784	42.138944, -73.797118	3602142917	00979160
Livonia	1808	Pittstown	Livingston	7,497	38.262	2.812	42.809081, -77.653652	3605142961	00979161
Lloyd	1845	New Paltz	Ulster	11,133	31.266	2.019	41.713907, -73.995071	3611142994	00979162
Locke	1802	Milton	Cayuga	1,879	24.305	0.105	42.654563, -76.419295	3601143071	00979163
Lockport	1824	Cambria and Royalton	Niagara	20,563	44.843	0.052	43.149249, -78.688845	3606343093	00979165
Lodi	1826	Covert	Seneca	1,482	34.190	5.574	42.591920, -76.831428	3609943225	00979166
Long Lake	1837	Arietta, Lake Pleasant, Morehouse and Wells	Hamilton	791	407.033	42.804	43.959554, -74.649161	3604143412	00979168
Lorraine	1804	Mexico	Jefferson	924	38.979	0.018	43.746703, -75.978134	3604543544	00979169
Louisville	1810	Massena	St. Lawrence	3,050	48.525	15.342	44.907722, -75.012207	3608943588	00979170
Lowville	1800	Mexico	Lewis	4,888	37.834	0.291	43.813957, -75.518200	3604943731	00979171
Lumberland	1798	Mamakating	Sullivan	2,243	46.539	2.807	41.492424, -74.812220	3610543786	00979172
Lyme	1818	Brownville	Jefferson	2,299	55.813	51.178	44.024801, -76.228673	3604543863	00979173
Lyndon	1829	Franklinville	Cattaraugus	685	33.231	0.036	42.310646, -78.375278	3600943896	00979174
Lyons	1811	Sodus	Wayne	5,679	37.485	0.111	43.093076, -77.003860	3611743973	00979175
Lyonsdale	1873	Greig	Lewis	1,170	68.743	1.362	43.589518, -75.242417	3604943995	00979176
Lysander	1794		Onondaga	23,074	61.715	2.894	43.184174, -76.373925	3606744039	00979177
Macedon	1823	Palmyra	Wayne	9,270	38.681	0.177	43.078887, -77.310520	3611744160	00979179
Machias	1827	Yorkshire	Cattaraugus	2,310	40.429	0.649	42.397788, -78.506904	3600944237	00979180
Macomb	1841	Gouverneur and Morristown	St. Lawrence	912	60.717	2.428	44.438707, -75.571306	3608944391	00979181
Madison	1807	Hamilton	Madison	2,766	40.813	0.576	42.892391, -75.500514	3605344435	00979182
Madrid	1802	Lisbon	St. Lawrence	1,744	52.984	0.598	44.770755, -75.128545	3608944490	00979183
Maine	1848	Union	Broome	5,168	45.643	0.117	42.196117, -76.016638	3600744611	00979184
Malone	1805	Chateaugay	Franklin	12,433	101.519	1.283	44.795395, -74.287115	3603344721	00979185
Malta	1802	Stillwater	Saratoga	17,130	27.922	3.532	42.982275, -73.789043	3609144743	00979186
Mamakating	1788		Sullivan	12,655	96.108	2.561	41.588001, -74.496288	3610544809	00979187
Mamaroneck	1788		Westchester	31,758	6.654	7.410	40.921287, -73.744138	3611944842	00979188
Manchester	1822	Farmington	Ontario	9,404	37.818	0.032	42.987045, -77.194148	3606944864	00979189
Manheim	1797	Palatine	Herkimer	3,082	29.136	0.557	43.058519, -74.799676	3604344974	00979191
Manlius	1794		Onondaga	33,712	49.218	0.735	43.052883, -75.980733	3606745029	00979192
Mansfield	1830	Little Valley	Cattaraugus	843	40.126	0.031	42.304609, -78.766918	3600945161	00979193
Marathon	1818	Cincinnatus	Cortland	2,038	24.937	0.133	42.428479, -76.002973	3602345403	00979194
Marbletown	1788	Marbletown Patent	Ulster	5,658	54.471	0.709	41.873887, -74.164153	3611145458	00979195
Marcellus	1794		Onondaga	6,066	32.445	0.140	42.942677, -76.323323	3606745491	00979196
Marcy	1832	Deerfield	Oneida	8,777	32.890	0.428	43.172612, -75.267738	3606545535	00979197
Marilla	1853	Alden and Wales	Erie	5,189	27.505	0.038	42.824491, -78.528331	3602945601	00979198
Marion	1825	Williamson	Wayne	4,566	29.147	0.103	43.166014, -77.191350	3611745645	00979199
Marlborough	1788	Marlborough Precinct	Ulster	8,712	24.470	2.029	41.636294, -73.987100	3611145722	00979200
Marshall	1829	Kirkland	Oneida	1,966	32.802	0.000	42.967126, -75.386204	3606545755	00979201
Martinsburg	1803	Turin	Lewis	1,316	75.684	0.351	43.726107, -75.540138	3604945854	00979202
Maryland	1808	Worcester	Otsego	1,760	52.406	0.135	42.550963, -74.865957	3607745920	00979203
Masonville	1811	Sidney	Delaware	1,239	54.264	0.179	42.229093, -75.342442	3602545964	00979204
Massena	1802	Lisbon	St. Lawrence	12,433	44.369	11.774	44.962020, -74.834650	3608946030	00979205
Mayfield	1793	Caughnawaga	Fulton	6,146	58.385	6.299	43.124810, -74.262935	3603546217	00979206
McDonough	1816	Preston	Chenango	797	39.038	0.593	42.501710, -75.728039	3601744127	00979178
Mendon	1812	Bloomfield	Monroe	9,095	39.472	0.515	42.982472, -77.555620	3605546558	00979208
Mentz	1802	Aurelius	Cayuga	2,114	16.922	0.260	43.040542, -76.633638	3601146602	00979209
Meredith	1800	Franklin and Kortright	Delaware	1,484	58.102	0.214	42.365138, -74.938997	3602546624	00979210
Mexico	1792	Whitestown	Oswego	5,259	46.272	0.717	43.455062, -76.204628	3607546822	00979211
Middleburgh	1797	Schoharie	Schoharie	3,112	49.111	0.098	42.621269, -74.312498	3609546855	00979212
Middlebury	1812	Warsaw	Wyoming	1,339	35.643	0.025	42.824030, -78.133264	3612146877	00979213
Middlefield	1797	Cherry Valley	Otsego	1,882	63.334	0.371	42.697002, -74.855985	3607746910	00979214
Middlesex	1796		Yates	1,377	30.875	3.229	42.718043, -77.289257	3612347020	00979215
Middletown	1789	Rochester and Woodstock	Delaware	3,336	96.674	0.620	42.160406, -74.628090	3602547031	00979216
Milan	1818	North East	Dutchess	2,245	36.109	0.468	41.978094, -73.783015	3602747207	00979218
Milford	1796	Unadilla	Otsego	2,827	46.117	1.030	42.546091, -74.979126	3607747240	00979219
Milo	1818	Benton	Yates	6,803	38.434	5.901	42.610474, -77.007902	3612347504	00979220
Milton	1792	Ballston	Saratoga	18,800	35.690	0.064	43.045801, -73.898137	3609147537	00979221
Mina	1824	Clymer	Chautauqua	1,007	35.817	0.511	42.124592, -79.699979	3601347592	00979222
Minden	1798	Canajoharie	Montgomery	4,166	50.988	0.449	42.931443, -74.696500	3605747614	00979223
Minerva	1817	Schroon	Essex	773	156.766	3.508	43.855335, -74.118459	3603147669	00979224
Minetto	1916	Oswego	Oswego	1,643	5.762	0.279	43.398731, -76.481313	3607547691	00979225
Minisink	1788	Goshen Precinct	Orange	4,621	23.029	0.144	41.324048, -74.541192	3607147713	00979226
Mohawk	1837	Johnstown	Montgomery	3,572	34.681	0.712	42.956072, -74.401834	3605747834	00979227
Moira	1828	Dickinson	Franklin	2,916	45.228	0.000	44.829578, -74.558807	3603347933	00979228
Monroe	1799	Cornwall	Orange	21,387	18.545	1.280	41.304162, -74.195149	3607147999	00979229
Montague	1850	West Turin	Lewis	97	65.174	0.163	43.715389, -75.716896	3604948032	00979230
Montezuma	1859	Mentz	Cayuga	1,177	18.242	0.473	43.013839, -76.697713	3601148131	00979231
Montgomery	1788	Montgomery Precinct	Orange	23,322	50.256	0.933	41.539832, -74.209619	3607148153	00979232
Montour	1860	Catharine	Schuyler	2,323	18.579	0.005	42.339941, -76.826462	3609748186	00979233
Mooers	1804	Champlain	Clinton	3,467	87.632	0.290	44.956357, -73.658432	3601948252	00979234
Moravia	1833	Sempronius	Cayuga	3,323	28.884	0.753	42.734243, -76.412216	3601148307	00979235
Moreau	1805	Northumberland	Saratoga	16,202	41.924	1.657	43.247423, -73.665699	3609148318	00979236
Morehouse	1835	Lake Pleasant	Hamilton	92	191.064	3.705	43.447326, -74.694618	3604148340	00979237
Moriah	1808	Elizabethtown	Essex	4,716	64.491	6.619	44.054967, -73.532619	3603148428	00979238
Morris	1849	Butternuts	Otsego	1,735	39.067	0.126	42.542840, -75.264076	3607748494	00979239
Morristown	1821	Oswegatchie	St. Lawrence	2,082	45.721	13.724	44.530931, -75.634507	3608948582	00979240
Mount Hope	1825	Deerpark and Wallkill	Orange	6,537	25.134	0.362	41.457255, -74.526761	3607148857	00979241
Mount Kisco	1978	Bedford and New Castle	Westchester	10,959	3.035	0.030	41.201696, -73.728258	3611948895	00979242
Mount Morris	1818	Leicester	Livingston	4,435	50.205	0.106	42.664871, -77.904533	3605148956	00979243
Mount Pleasant	1788		Westchester	44,436	27.423	5.335	41.098212, -73.822328	3611949011	00979244
Murray	1808	Northampton	Orleans	4,796	31.059	0.040	43.258470, -78.057139	3607349286	00979246
Nanticoke	1831	Lisle	Broome	1,581	24.270	0.089	42.284937, -76.026586	3600749396	00979247
Naples	1789		Ontario	2,403	39.685	0.000	42.624554, -77.432501	3606949440	00979248
Napoli	1823	Little Valley	Cattaraugus	1,171	36.375	0.170	42.212802, -78.884569	3600949462	00979249
Nassau	1806	Petersburgh, Schodack and Stephentown	Rensselaer	4,545	44.444	0.792	42.547941, -73.544568	3608349517	00979250
Nelson	1807	Cazenovia	Madison	1,890	43.060	0.996	42.885733, -75.745149	3605349770	00979251
Neversink	1798	Rochester	Sullivan	3,366	82.773	3.491	41.865968, -74.590457	3610549847	00979252
New Albion	1830	Little Valley	Cattaraugus	1,981	35.629	0.194	42.306800, -78.889687	3600949880	00979253
New Baltimore	1811	Coxsackie	Greene	3,226	41.427	1.601	42.420048, -73.862587	3603949935	00979255
New Berlin	1807	Norwich	Chenango	2,525	46.134	0.440	42.592026, -75.386612	3601749957	00979256
New Bremen	1848	Croghan and Watson	Lewis	2,785	55.589	0.200	43.851984, -75.368301	3604950001	00979257
New Castle	1791	North Castle	Westchester	18,311	23.236	0.383	41.182534, -73.772847	3611950078	00979260
New Hartford	1827	Whitestown	Oneida	21,874	25.357	0.118	43.057841, -75.281803	3606550309	00979264
New Haven	1813	Mexico	Oswego	2,931	31.099	2.315	43.471604, -76.317562	3607550342	00979265
New Hudson	1825	Rushford	Allegany	792	36.195	0.124	42.285310, -78.253007	3600350375	00979266
New Lebanon	1818	Canaan	Columbia	2,514	35.857	0.116	42.470550, -73.444812	3602150452	00979267
New Lisbon	1806	Pittsfield	Otsego	1,084	44.355	0.301	42.624535, -75.133503	3607750485	00979268
New Paltz	1788	New Paltz Patent	Ulster	14,407	33.875	0.432	41.764040, -74.089495	3611150562	00979269
New Scotland	1832	Bethlehem	Albany	9,096	57.499	0.470	42.603490, -73.939215	3600150672	00979272
New Windsor	1788	New Windsor Precinct	Orange	27,805	34.070	2.994	41.474548, -74.110922	3607150848	00979274
Newark Valley	1823	Berkshire	Tioga	3,642	50.295	0.100	42.234926, -76.164054	3610749913	00979254
Newburgh	1788	Newburgh Precinct	Orange	31,985	42.678	4.265	41.557401, -74.057242	3607150045	00979259
Newcomb	1828	Minerva and Moriah	Essex	418	226.271	6.898	44.007172, -74.099920	3603150144	00979261
Newfane	1824	Hartland, Somerset and Wilson	Niagara	9,304	51.823	1.657	43.290183, -78.692824	3606350232	00979262
Newfield	1811	Spencer	Tompkins	5,126	58.841	0.127	42.337140, -76.610245	3610950254	00979263
Newport	1805	Fairfield, Herkimer, Norway and Schuyler	Herkimer	2,140	32.009	0.443	43.178280, -75.035993	3604350584	00979270
Newstead	1823	Clarence	Erie	8,689	50.759	0.286	43.016832, -78.521355	3602950716	00979273
Niagara	1812	Cambria	Niagara	7,903	9.484	0.000	43.115446, -78.980980	3606351033	00979275
Nichols	1824	Tioga	Tioga	2,347	33.727	0.938	42.034436, -76.348183	3610751121	00979277
Niles	1833	Sempronius	Cayuga	1,137	38.975	4.376	42.817220, -76.404435	3601151198	00979278
Niskayuna	1809	Watervliet	Schenectady	23,278	14.152	0.890	42.803082, -73.873518	3609351264	00979279
Norfolk	1869	Louisville	St. Lawrence	4,453	56.740	1.004	44.835018, -74.933952	3608951330	00979280
North Castle	1788		Westchester	12,408	23.757	2.604	41.136327, -73.690502	3611951693	00979282
North Collins	1852	Collins	Erie	3,504	42.854	0.173	42.573346, -78.859472	3602951803	00979283
North Dansville	1846	Sparta	Livingston	5,321	9.859	0.000	42.558340, -77.691505	3605151869	00979284
North East	1788	North Precinct	Dutchess	2,971	43.163	0.559	41.945843, -73.546630	3602751891	00979285
North Elba	1849	Keene	Essex	7,480	151.654	4.737	44.206113, -74.046280	3603151935	00979286
North Greenbush	1855	Greenbush	Rensselaer	13,292	18.545	0.363	42.673448, -73.668381	3608352100	00979287
North Harmony	1918	Harmony	Chautauqua	2,192	42.133	0.023	42.125557, -79.463345	3601352155	00979288
North Hempstead	1788	North Hempstead Patent	Nassau	237,639	53.512	15.598	40.803357, -73.678402	3605953000	00979289
North Hudson	1848	Moriah	Essex	250	181.452	3.218	44.027010, -73.758053	3603153077	00979290
North Norwich	1849	Norwich	Chenango	1,664	28.142	0.102	42.590088, -75.508076	3601753297	00979291
North Salem	1788		Westchester	5,243	21.326	1.519	41.340527, -73.597609	3611953517	00979292
Northampton	1799	Broadalbin	Fulton	2,472	21.116	13.613	43.157631, -74.171313	3603551407	00979281
Northumberland	1798	Saratoga	Saratoga	5,242	32.299	0.619	43.162315, -73.628333	3609153737	00979294
Norway	1792	Herkimer	Herkimer	740	35.560	0.273	43.230908, -74.950873	3604353968	00979295
Norwich	1793	Jericho and Union	Chenango	3,599	41.963	0.075	42.510875, -75.485910	3601753990	00979297
Nunda	1808	Angelica	Livingston	2,688	37.094	0.027	42.572208, -77.882896	3605154089	00979298
Oakfield	1842	Elba	Genesee	3,145	23.309	0.624	43.084919, -78.274609	3603754166	00979299
Ogden	1817	Parma	Monroe	20,270	36.476	0.257	43.170256, -77.814379	3605554474	00979300
Ohio	1823	Norway	Herkimer	962	301.344	6.227	43.461635, -74.894694	3604354507	00979302
Olean	1808	Batavia	Cattaraugus	1,881	29.609	0.127	42.061319, -78.424466	3600954727	00979306
Olive	1823	Hurley, Marbletown and Shandaken	Ulster	4,226	58.450	6.743	41.947232, -74.265447	3611154749	00979307
Oneonta	1830	Milford and Otego	Otsego	5,065	32.911	0.252	42.425124, -75.099877	3607754892	00979310
Onondaga	1798	Manlius, Marcellus and Pompey	Onondaga	22,937	57.741	0.096	42.980793, -76.223386	3606754958	00979311
Ontario	1807	Williamson	Wayne	10,446	32.412	0.086	43.245527, -77.315958	3611755013	00979313
Oppenheim	1808	Palatine	Fulton	1,751	56.134	0.306	43.082177, -74.671976	3603555101	00979314
Orange	1813	Wayne	Schuyler	1,408	54.069	0.385	42.342520, -77.035679	3609755156	00979315
Orangetown	1788		Rockland	48,655	24.098	7.268	41.053687, -73.948090	3608755211	00979316
Orangeville	1816	Attica	Wyoming	1,283	35.560	0.082	42.743585, -78.252437	3612155222	00979317
Orchard Park	1850	Hamburg	Erie	29,686	38.440	0.079	42.752803, -78.739697	3602955277	00979318
Orleans	1821	Brownville	Jefferson	2,788	71.423	6.620	44.224057, -75.954704	3604555398	00979319
Orwell	1817	Richland	Oswego	1,077	39.582	1.684	43.562832, -75.953544	3607555453	00979320
Osceola	1844	West Turin	Lewis	243	87.007	0.089	43.565418, -75.688833	3604955497	00979321
Ossian	1808	Angelica	Livingston	724	39.635	0.028	42.514478, -77.770393	3605155508	00979322
Ossining	1845	Mount Pleasant	Westchester	40,061	11.556	4.168	41.157624, -73.855497	3611955541	00979323
Oswegatchie	1802	Lisbon	St. Lawrence	4,158	65.498	5.705	44.630179, -75.490706	3608955563	00979324
Oswego	1818	Hannibal	Oswego	7,914	27.333	2.016	43.402443, -76.555037	3607555585	00979326
Otego	1822	Franklin and Unadilla	Otsego	2,756	45.633	0.076	42.455996, -75.191937	3607755629	00979327
Otisco	1806	Marcellus, Pompey and Tully	Onondaga	2,368	29.532	1.629	42.862345, -76.227534	3606755651	00979328
Otsego	1788		Otsego	3,641	53.890	5.162	42.759357, -74.963246	3607755695	00979329
Otselic	1817	German	Chenango	859	37.977	0.067	42.682876, -75.737515	3601755717	00979330
Otto	1823	Perrysburg	Cattaraugus	777	32.730	0.117	42.399472, -78.843783	3600955783	00979331
Ovid	1794		Seneca	2,847	30.861	7.893	42.650033, -76.796042	3609955827	00979332
Owasco	1802	Aurelius	Cayuga	3,552	20.881	2.594	42.893765, -76.493283	3601155871	00979333
Owego	1800	Union	Tioga	18,777	104.221	1.522	42.085789, -76.195197	3610755893	00979334
Oxford	1793	Jericho and Union	Chenango	3,614	60.063	0.352	42.397073, -75.596228	3601755959	00979335
Oyster Bay	1788	Oyster Bay Patent	Nassau	301,332	103.747	65.652	40.797850, -73.511027	3605956000	00979336
Palatine	1788	Palatine District	Montgomery	3,189	41.072	0.629	42.951214, -74.536743	3605756099	00979337
Palermo	1832	Volney	Oswego	3,470	40.464	0.279	43.367354, -76.259496	3607556154	00979338
Palm Tree	2019	Monroe	Orange	32,954	1.462	0.01	41.340667, -74.167274	3607156185	02791540
Palmyra	1789		Wayne	7,403	33.435	0.234	43.080171, -77.189141	3611756198	00979339
Pamelia	1819	Brownville	Jefferson	3,343	33.840	1.369	44.055634, -75.909304	3604556209	00979340
Paris	1792	Whitestown	Oneida	4,332	31.476	0.015	42.972126, -75.268197	3606556330	00979341
Parish	1828	Mexico	Oswego	2,398	41.725	0.225	43.403463, -76.056042	3607556352	00979342
Parishville	1814	Hopkinton	St. Lawrence	2,038	98.159	3.270	44.550545, -74.784882	3608956374	00979343
Parma	1808	Northampton	Monroe	16,217	42.023	0.960	43.268626, -77.799747	3605556561	00979344
Patterson	1795	Frederick	Putnam	11,541	32.208	0.696	41.484467, -73.588058	3607956748	00979345
Pavilion	1841	Covington	Genesee	2,290	35.612	0.108	42.907121, -78.011511	3603756792	00979346
Pawling	1788	Pawling's Precinct	Dutchess	8,012	43.835	1.187	41.568545, -73.596037	3602756825	00979347
Pelham	1788		Westchester	13,078	2.172	0.046	40.900458, -73.807138	3611957012	00979349
Pembroke	1812	Batavia	Genesee	4,264	41.627	0.090	43.001529, -78.385383	3603757078	00979350
Pendleton	1827	Niagara	Niagara	7,035	27.086	0.270	43.104129, -78.764378	3606357111	00979351
Penfield	1810	Boyle	Monroe	39,438	37.211	0.634	43.151464, -77.444396	3605557144	00979352
Perinton	1812	Boyle	Monroe	47,479	34.186	0.360	43.078241, -77.429678	3605557221	00979353
Perry	1814	Leicester	Wyoming	5,832	36.405	0.242	42.753724, -78.011059	3612157254	00979354
Perrysburg	1814	Hebe and Olean	Cattaraugus	1,518	28.421	0.126	42.481182, -79.017384	3600957298	00979355
Persia	1835	Perrysburg	Cattaraugus	2,207	20.893	0.097	42.419658, -78.917725	3600957331	00979356
Perth	1838	Amsterdam	Fulton	3,584	26.083	0.027	43.005407, -74.204069	3603557353	00979357
Peru	1792	Plattsburgh and Willsboro	Clinton	6,772	78.887	13.492	44.581071, -73.563663	3601957375	00979358
Petersburgh	1791	Stephentown	Rensselaer	1,372	41.605	0.003	42.778625, -73.327429	3608357441	00979359
Pharsalia	1806	Norwich	Chenango	516	38.816	0.292	42.597620, -75.733879	3601757507	00979360
Phelps	1796		Ontario	6,637	64.951	0.293	42.957092, -77.049404	3606957529	00979361
Philadelphia	1821	Le Ray	Jefferson	1,975	37.593	0.021	44.146432, -75.706199	3604557562	00979362
Philipstown	1788	Philips Precinct	Putnam	9,831	48.785	2.785	41.412373, -73.921362	3607957584	00979363
Piercefield	1900	Hopkinton	St. Lawrence	282	104.155	6.910	44.223107, -74.604155	3608957716	00979364
Pierrepont	1818	Potsdam and Russell	St. Lawrence	2,523	60.252	0.468	44.528153, -75.013342	3608957771	00979365
Pike	1818	Nunda	Wyoming	975	31.084	0.145	42.567205, -78.136330	3612157826	00979366
Pinckney	1808	Harrisburgh and Rodman	Lewis	313	40.973	0.142	43.834407, -75.788975	3604957925	00979367
Pine Plains	1823	North East	Dutchess	2,218	30.583	0.589	41.971895, -73.646798	3602758156	00979368
Pitcairn	1836	Edwards and Fowler	St. Lawrence	790	58.518	0.937	44.221791, -75.269674	3608958266	00979369
Pitcher	1827	German and Lincklaen	Chenango	667	28.465	0.014	42.587692, -75.826755	3601758288	00979370
Pittsfield	1797	Burlington	Otsego	1,312	37.986	0.116	42.613708, -75.271482	3607758343	00979371
Pittsford	1814	Smallwood	Monroe	30,617	23.181	0.209	43.073053, -77.526122	3605558365	00979372
Pittstown	1788	Schaghticoke district	Rensselaer	5,540	61.628	3.216	42.866298, -73.516623	3608358398	00979373
Plainfield	1799	Richfield	Otsego	922	29.500	0.000	42.828409, -75.194691	3607758420	00979374
Plattekill	1800	Marlborough	Ulster	10,424	35.111	0.628	41.654309, -74.074168	3611158552	00979375
Plattsburgh	1788	Plattsburgh township	Clinton	11,886	45.920	22.288	44.692289, -73.516453	3601958585	00979377
Pleasant Valley	1821	Clinton	Dutchess	9,799	32.576	0.564	41.770553, -73.804513	3602758695	00979378
Plymouth	1806	Norwich	Chenango	1,619	42.177	0.169	42.605218, -75.604990	3601758772	00979379
Poestenkill	1848	Sand Lake	Rensselaer	4,322	32.355	0.220	42.700200, -73.522487	3608358805	00979380
Poland	1832	Ellicott	Chautauqua	2,214	36.617	0.266	42.130072, -79.120853	3601358926	00979381
Pomfret	1808	Chautauqua	Chautauqua	13,035	43.855	0.334	42.408411, -79.331104	3601358981	00979382
Pompey	1794		Onondaga	7,080	66.378	0.097	42.920118, -75.987654	3606759036	00979383
Portage	1827	Nunda	Livingston	763	26.399	0.236	42.559566, -77.994897	3605159179	00979385
Porter	1812	Cambria	Niagara	6,513	33.055	4.659	43.257885, -78.970237	3606359267	00979386
Portland	1813	Chautauqua	Chautauqua	4,309	34.116	0.064	42.370198, -79.460235	3601359421	00979388
Portville	1837	Olean	Cattaraugus	3,504	35.580	0.448	42.058997, -78.349923	3600959509	00979389
Potsdam	1806	Madrid	St. Lawrence	14,901	101.403	2.049	44.681716, -75.037123	3608959575	00979390
Potter	1832	Middlesex	Yates	1,858	37.238	0.000	42.714053, -77.180665	3612359597	00979391
Poughkeepsie	1788	Poughkeepsie Precinct	Dutchess	45,471	28.514	2.630	41.668590, -73.909694	3602759652	00979393
Pound Ridge	1788		Westchester	5,082	22.638	0.803	41.212382, -73.583842	3611959685	00979394
Prattsburgh	1813	Pulteney	Steuben	1,983	51.666	0.050	42.536924, -77.332353	3610159718	00979395
Prattsville	1824	Windham	Greene	774	19.627	0.106	42.319673, -74.413796	3603959751	00979396
Preble	1818	Tully	Cortland	1,357	26.845	0.715	42.743388, -76.131743	3602359773	00979397
Preston	1806	Norwich	Chenango	895	34.876	0.171	42.503326, -75.610357	3601759817	00979398
Princetown	1798	Schenectady	Schenectady	2,024	23.924	0.287	42.810065, -74.078398	3609359861	00979399
Providence	1796	Galway	Saratoga	2,075	43.996	1.098	43.117124, -74.044548	3609159949	00979400
Pulteney	1808	Bath	Steuben	1,258	33.137	3.317	42.525381, -77.202981	3610159982	00979401
Putnam	1806	Westfield	Washington	567	32.791	2.627	43.746887, -73.417527	3611560092	00979402
Putnam Valley	1839	Philipstown	Putnam	11,762	41.175	1.605	41.397661, -73.839130	3607960147	00979403
Queensbury	1788	Queensbury township	Warren	29,169	62.830	2.009	43.367580, -73.674127	3611360356	00979405
Ramapo	1791	Haverstraw	Rockland	148,919	61.198	0.696	41.140772, -74.104976	3608760510	00979406
Randolph	1826	Conewango	Cattaraugus	2,469	36.064	0.223	42.134227, -78.999392	3600960587	00979407
Rathbone	1856	Addison, Cameron and Woodhull	Steuben	1,093	36.017	0.102	42.129144, -77.344420	3610160653	00979408
Reading	1806	Wayne	Schuyler	1,719	27.149	0.000	42.419776, -76.938604	3609760763	00979409
Red Hook	1812	Rhinebeck	Dutchess	9,953	36.169	3.871	42.017297, -73.887226	3602760905	00979411
Red House	1869	Salamanca	Cattaraugus	27	55.668	0.188	42.069945, -78.735256	3600960950	00979412
Redfield	1800	Mexico	Oswego	476	89.817	3.606	43.587290, -75.828862	3607560873	00979410
Remsen	1798	Norway	Oneida	1,761	35.465	1.490	43.366186, -75.145858	3606561126	00979413
Rensselaerville	1790	Watervliet	Albany	1,826	61.464	0.420	42.479477, -74.178608	3600161181	00979415
Rhinebeck	1788	Rhinebeck Precinct	Dutchess	7,596	35.682	4.068	41.926515, -73.901901	3602761357	00979416
Richfield	1792	Otsego	Otsego	2,065	30.858	1.598	42.851319, -75.047690	3607761467	00979417
Richford	1831	Berkshire	Tioga	1,043	38.187	0.019	42.374929, -76.194015	3610761511	00979418
Richland	1807	Williamstown	Oswego	5,637	57.248	2.801	43.547529, -76.150737	3607561533	00979419
Richmond	1796		Ontario	3,360	42.432	1.960	42.792188, -77.524422	3606961544	00978648
Richmondville	1849	Cobleskill	Schoharie	2,466	30.160	0.065	42.638725, -74.549064	3609561599	00979421
Ridgeway	1812	Batavia	Orleans	6,598	50.026	0.216	43.262390, -78.376743	3607361742	00979422
Riga	1808	Northampton	Monroe	5,586	34.962	0.266	43.077283, -77.872558	3605561808	00979423
Ripley	1817	Portland	Chautauqua	2,323	48.763	0.104	42.228753, -79.699933	3601361885	00979424
Riverhead	1792	Southold	Suffolk	35,902	67.426	133.841	40.977130, -72.709075	3610361984	00979425
Rochester	1788	Rochester Patent	Ulster	7,272	89.303	0.416	41.813814, -74.271498	3611163011	00979427
Rockland	1910	Neversink	Sullivan	3,290	94.156	1.114	41.962793, -74.789085	3610563176	00979428
Rodman	1804	Adams	Jefferson	1,197	42.227	0.053	43.843311, -75.901890	3604563341	00979429
Romulus	1794		Seneca	3,203	37.792	13.591	42.713496, -76.830175	3609963440	00979431
Root	1823	Charleston	Montgomery	2,013	50.624	0.426	42.842974, -74.486200	3605763561	00979432
Rose	1826	Wolcott	Wayne	2,291	33.896	0.006	43.159574, -76.900163	3611763605	00979433
Roseboom	1854	Cherry Valley	Otsego	690	33.407	0.104	42.726358, -74.711108	3607763638	00979434
Rosendale	1844	Hurley, Marbletown and New Paltz	Ulster	5,782	19.979	0.767	41.847090, -74.079545	3611163737	00979435
Rossie	1813	Russell	St. Lawrence	799	37.880	1.363	44.325191, -75.623823	3608963858	00979436
Rotterdam	1820	Schenectady	Schenectady	30,523	35.692	0.768	42.812110, -74.012038	3609363935	00979437
Roxbury	1799	Stamford	Delaware	2,247	87.114	0.490	42.308761, -74.528839	3602564001	00979438
Royalton	1817	Hartland	Niagara	7,517	69.966	0.311	43.151820, -78.554307	3606364034	00979439
Rush	1818	Avon	Monroe	3,490	30.332	0.373	42.971329, -77.673143	3605564144	00979440
Rushford	1816	Caneadea	Allegany	1,079	35.294	0.790	42.393073, -78.250648	3600364166	00979441
Russell	1807	Hopkinton	St. Lawrence	1,872	96.675	0.618	44.402017, -75.140740	3608964221	00979442
Russia	1806	Norway	Herkimer	2,269	56.962	3.456	43.304033, -75.069132	3604364254	00979443
Rutland	1802	Watertown	Jefferson	3,038	45.103	0.275	43.943967, -75.786233	3604564265	00979444
Rye	1788		Westchester	49,613	6.919	0.435	41.005831, -73.687696	3611964320	00979446
Salamanca	1854	Little Valley	Cattaraugus	470	18.391	0.001	42.174412, -78.805947	3600964760	00979451
Salem	1788	Salem township	Washington	2,612	52.362	0.058	43.160157, -73.322777	3611564782	00979452
Salina	1809	Manlius and Onondaga	Onondaga	33,223	13.750	1.311	43.104764, -76.171345	3606764815	00979453
Salisbury	1797	Palatine	Herkimer	1,830	107.366	0.835	43.221999, -74.800865	3604364837	00979454
Sand Lake	1812	Greensush and Berlin	Rensselaer	8,348	35.049	1.120	42.630352, -73.542926	3608365013	00979455
Sandy Creek	1825	Richland	Oswego	3,813	42.284	4.157	43.630705, -76.123570	3607565079	00979456
Sanford	1821	Windsor	Broome	2,239	90.098	0.924	42.091134, -75.496193	3600765112	00979457
Sangerfield	1795	Paris	Oneida	2,327	30.802	0.179	42.891607, -75.380220	3606565134	00979458
Santa Clara	1888	Brandon	Franklin	332	174.417	17.292	44.499084, -74.363864	3603365178	00979459
Saranac	1824	Plattsburgh	Clinton	3,852	115.286	0.661	44.654271, -73.809920	3601965211	00979460
Saratoga	1788	Saratoga district	Saratoga	5,808	40.562	2.339	43.053058, -73.650366	3609165244	00979461
Sardinia	1821	Concord	Erie	2,716	50.175	0.233	42.557155, -78.531553	3602965277	00979463
Saugerties	1811	Kingston	Ulster	19,038	64.574	3.386	42.091943, -73.990006	3611165299	00979464
Savannah	1824	Galen	Wayne	1,632	35.968	0.211	43.079337, -76.754525	3611765343	00979465
Scarsdale	1788		Westchester	18,253	6.660	0.008	40.992048, -73.780629	3611965442	00979466
Schaghticoke	1788	Schaghticoke district	Rensselaer	7,445	49.747	2.114	42.883991, -73.610736	3608365486	00979467
Schodack	1795	Rensselaerwyck	Rensselaer	12,965	61.927	1.676	42.531451, -73.683163	3608365541	00979469
Schoharie	1788	United Districts of Duanesburgh and Schoharie	Schoharie	3,107	29.830	0.129	42.679620, -74.312894	3609565596	00979470
Schroeppel	1832	Volney	Oswego	7,969	42.201	0.996	43.257590, -76.276426	3607565618	00979471
Schroon	1804	Crown Point	Essex	1,880	132.678	8.732	43.855433, -73.761629	3603165629	00979472
Schuyler	1792	Herkimer	Herkimer	3,296	39.874	0.358	43.112509, -75.096412	3604365695	00979473
Schuyler Falls	1848	Plattsburgh	Clinton	4,843	36.517	0.302	44.659745, -73.584421	3601965717	00979474
Scio	1823	Angelica	Allegany	1,614	35.295	0.039	42.147968, -77.992253	3600365772	00979475
Scipio	1794		Cayuga	1,531	36.558	2.751	42.790136, -76.571551	3601165816	00979476
Scott	1815	Preble	Cortland	1,077	22.267	0.147	42.737658, -76.235848	3602365915	00979477
Scriba	1811	Volney	Oswego	6,617	40.571	3.342	43.457249, -76.419713	3607565992	00979478
Sempronius	1799	Scipio	Cayuga	840	29.339	0.379	42.740769, -76.327202	3601166278	00979479
Seneca	1793		Ontario	2,644	50.450	0.000	42.833118, -77.073631	3606966289	00979480
Seneca Falls	1829	Junius	Seneca	9,027	24.217	3.242	42.911496, -76.790451	3609966333	00979481
Sennett	1827	Aurelius and Brutus	Cayuga	3,304	28.820	0.024	42.977578, -76.518365	3601166443	00979482
Seward	1840	Sharon	Schoharie	1,583	36.377	0.079	42.708203, -74.582782	3609566542	00979483
Shandaken	1804	Woodstock	Ulster	2,866	119.784	0.058	42.027684, -74.359949	3611166597	00979484
Sharon	1797	Schoharie	Schoharie	1,697	39.062	0.098	42.776929, -74.613153	3609566641	00979485
Shawangunk	1788	Shawangunk Precinct	Ulster	13,563	56.056	0.494	41.632207, -74.265852	3611166674	00979486
Shelby	1818	Ridgeway	Orleans	4,907	46.390	0.339	43.173342, -78.386811	3607366751	00979487
Sheldon	1808	Batavia	Wyoming	2,367	47.348	0.025	42.746076, -78.376579	3612166773	00979488
Shelter Island	1788	Shelter Island Patent	Suffolk	3,253	12.165	16.944	41.064875, -72.319266	3610366839	00979489
Sherburne	1795	Paris	Chenango	3,973	43.554	0.020	42.693974, -75.481214	3601766894	00979490
Sheridan	1827	Hanover and Pomfret	Chautauqua	2,564	37.252	0.051	42.489629, -79.225464	3601366916	00979491
Sherman	1824	Mina	Chautauqua	1,622	36.271	0.130	42.135974, -79.579860	3601366960	00979492
Sidney	1801	Franklin	Delaware	5,536	49.928	0.675	42.306706, -75.276026	3602567345	00979495
Skaneateles	1830	Marcellus	Onondaga	7,112	42.606	6.220	42.889641, -76.411805	3606767521	00979496
Smithfield	1807	Cazenovia	Madison	1,127	24.274	0.086	42.964853, -75.664275	3605367785	00979497
Smithtown	1788	Smithtown Patent	Suffolk	116,296	53.698	57.752	40.919217, -73.179119	3610368000	00979498
Smithville	1808	Greene	Chenango	1,255	50.445	0.481	42.412034, -75.757510	3601768055	00979499
Smyrna	1808	Sherburne	Chenango	1,237	42.087	0.076	42.687973, -75.615788	3601768110	00979500
Sodus	1789	District of Sodus	Wayne	8,028	67.268	1.979	43.218114, -77.049402	3611768220	00979501
Solon	1798	Homer	Cortland	1,063	29.651	0.076	42.614497, -76.021213	3602368264	00979502
Somers	1788		Westchester	21,541	29.642	2.518	41.304384, -73.722774	3611968308	00979503
Somerset	1823	Hartland	Niagara	2,597	37.108	0.063	43.335736, -78.548106	3606368330	00979504
South Bristol	1838	Bristol	Ontario	1,641	38.973	3.051	42.695179, -77.405203	3606968660	00979506
South Valley	1847	Randolph	Cattaraugus	250	36.840	0.247	42.045260, -79.002709	3600969870	00979510
Southampton	1788	Southampton Patent	Suffolk	69,036	139.195	154.510	40.880463, -72.459056	3610368473	00979505
Southeast	1788	South East Precinct	Putnam	18,058	31.734	3.245	41.408190, -73.600783	3607968924	00979507
Southold	1788	Southold Patent	Suffolk	23,732	53.783	349.917	41.138956, -72.318687	3610369463	00979508
Southport	1822	Elmira	Chemung	9,691	46.414	0.426	42.049974, -76.877424	3601569617	00979509
Spafford	1811	Marcellus, Sempronius and Tully	Onondaga	1,588	32.698	6.518	42.829700, -76.289228	3606770057	00979511
Sparta	1789		Livingston	1,583	27.791	0.000	42.627796, -77.697587	3605170101	00979512
Spencer	1806	Owego	Tioga	2,968	49.550	0.326	42.221933, -76.469262	3610770178	00979513
Springfield	1797	Cherry Valley	Otsego	1,346	42.894	2.614	42.833390, -74.866643	3607770310	00979514
Springport	1823	Aruelius and Scipio	Cayuga	2,227	21.399	5.431	42.852667, -76.672327	3601170376	00979515
Springwater	1816	Naples and Sparta	Livingston	2,286	53.105	0.013	42.623129, -77.573945	3605170475	00979516
St. Armand	1844	Wilmington	Essex	1,446	56.511	0.934	44.371394, -74.013405	3603164529	00979447
St. Johnsville	1838	Oppenheim	Montgomery	2,598	16.841	0.518	43.004228, -74.680656	3605764650	00979448
Stafford	1820	Batavia and Le Roy	Genesee	2,424	31.097	0.179	42.993829, -78.083947	3603770607	00979517
Stamford	1792		Delaware	2,000	48.505	0.106	42.339032, -74.665791	3602570629	00979518
Stanford	1793	Washington	Dutchess	3,682	49.637	0.649	41.898802, -73.673133	3602770662	00979519
Stark	1828	Danube	Herkimer	714	31.833	0.003	42.927935, -74.824074	3604370794	00979520
Starkey	1824	Reading	Yates	3,407	32.831	6.375	42.523656, -76.944782	3612370816	00979521
Stephentown	1788	Stephentown district	Rensselaer	2,791	57.880	0.196	42.554474, -73.410846	3608371102	00979523
Sterling	1812	Cato	Cayuga	3,221	45.454	1.661	43.315061, -76.658710	3601171146	00979524
Steuben	1792	Whitestown	Oneida	1,081	42.653	0.048	43.352758, -75.263978	3606571212	00979525
Stillwater	1788	Halfmoon district	Saratoga	9,022	41.191	2.383	42.968809, -73.687249	3609171333	00979526
Stockbridge	1836	Augusta, Lenox, Smithfield and Vernon	Madison	1,972	31.655	0.000	42.986010, -75.591615	3605371399	00979527
Stockholm	1806	Massena	St. Lawrence	3,816	93.897	0.392	44.745612, -74.855877	3608971410	00979528
Stockport	1833	Ghent, Hudson and Stuyvesant	Columbia	2,670	11.648	1.505	42.316875, -73.755319	3602171443	00979529
Stockton	1821	Chautauqua	Chautauqua	2,044	47.160	0.489	42.299455, -79.356732	3601371476	00979530
Stony Creek	1852	Athol	Warren	758	82.162	1.042	43.415025, -74.027450	3611371641	00979531
Stony Point	1865	Heverstraw	Rockland	14,813	27.624	3.975	41.251644, -74.004151	3608771674	00979532
Stratford	1805	Palatine	Fulton	538	74.876	1.795	43.209651, -74.610052	3603571784	00979533
Stuyvesant	1823	Kinderhook	Columbia	1,931	25.004	1.745	42.397099, -73.752982	3602171850	00979534
Sullivan	1803	Cazenovia	Madison	14,794	73.163	0.199	43.090651, -75.883413	3605371993	00979535
Summerhill	1831	Locke	Cayuga	1,108	25.861	0.123	42.652705, -76.321053	3601172037	00979536
Summit	1819	Cobleskill and Jefferson	Schoharie	1,072	37.085	0.399	42.574096, -74.598793	3609572070	00979537
Sweden	1814	Murray	Monroe	13,244	33.679	0.152	43.176584, -77.925596	3605572455	00979538
Taghkanic	1803	Livingston	Columbia	1,231	39.972	0.166	42.134165, -73.677782	3602173077	00979540
Taylor	1849	Solon	Cortland	452	29.995	0.124	42.595600, -75.918781	3602373220	00979541
Theresa	1841	Alexandria	Jefferson	2,648	64.943	4.789	44.262166, -75.774289	3604573528	00979542
Thompson	1803	Mamakating	Sullivan	16,550	84.089	3.408	41.647897, -74.676992	3610573627	00979543
Throop	1859	Aurelius, Mentz and Sennett	Cayuga	1,831	18.586	0.111	42.983620, -76.618881	3601173770	00979544
Thurman	1852	Athol	Warren	1,095	91.098	1.678	43.491968, -73.985941	3611373814	00979545
Thurston	1844	Cameron	Steuben	1,253	36.353	0.165	42.225195, -77.278932	3610173836	00979546
Ticonderoga	1804	Crown Point	Essex	4,789	81.433	7.012	43.836623, -73.552805	3603173891	00979547
Tioga	1788		Tioga	4,440	58.620	0.839	42.106190, -76.368903	3610773968	00979548
Tompkins	1806	Franklin	Delaware	1,290	98.133	6.314	42.115953, -75.273488	3602574111	00979549
Tonawanda	1836	Buffalo	Erie	72,636	18.735	1.544	42.983370, -78.875671	3602975000	00979551
Torrey	1851	Benton and Milo	Yates	1,299	22.760	10.915	42.669875, -76.954553	3612375055	00979555
Trenton	1797	Schuyler	Oneida	4,297	43.376	0.341	43.260164, -75.206377	3606575280	00979556
Triangle	1831	Lisle	Broome	2,809	37.875	1.907	42.355532, -75.928402	3600775319	00979557
Troupsburg	1808	Addison and Canisteo	Steuben	1,017	61.238	0.028	42.071329, -77.531843	3610175440	00979558
Truxton	1808	Fabius	Cortland	997	44.649	0.078	42.710309, -76.024363	3602375550	00979560
Tully	1803	Fabius	Onondaga	2,676	25.754	0.525	42.808361, -76.137034	3606775638	00979561
Tupper Lake	1890	Waverly	Franklin	5,147	117.348	12.754	44.243083, -74.472799	3603375676	00978671
Turin	1800	Mexico	Lewis	768	31.176	0.203	43.661440, -75.427289	3604975693	00979562
Tuscarora	1859	Addison	Steuben	1,390	37.627	0.085	42.048968, -77.256751	3610175737	00979563
Tusten	1853	Lumberland and Mamakating	Sullivan	1,405	47.205	1.580	41.570310, -74.995308	3610575759	00979565
Tuxedo	1890	Monroe	Orange	3,811	47.047	2.299	41.242006, -74.171688	3607175781	00979566
Tyre	1829	Junius	Seneca	1,013	30.054	3.060	42.987172, -76.787859	3609975902	00979567
Tyrone	1822	Wayne	Schuyler	1,637	37.296	2.332	42.442051, -77.044275	3609775924	00979568
Ulster	1879	Kingston	Ulster	12,660	26.803	2.077	41.970522, -74.005113	3611175935	00979569
Ulysses	1794		Tompkins	4,890	32.889	4.026	42.513031, -76.617330	3610975990	00979570
Unadilla	1792	Otsego	Otsego	4,116	46.254	0.419	42.368462, -75.331561	3607776012	00979571
Union	1791		Broome	56,138	35.452	0.538	42.126619, -76.033242	3600776056	00979572
Union Vale	1827	Beekman and LaGrange	Dutchess	4,558	37.482	0.324	41.698971, -73.694735	3602776166	00979573
Urbana	1822	Bath	Steuben	2,122	40.946	3.231	42.410122, -77.226538	3610176496	00979574
Van Buren	1829	Camillus	Onondaga	14,367	35.408	0.704	43.119934, -76.354809	3606776760	00979576
Van Etten	1854	Cayuta and Erin	Chemung	1,539	41.446	0.124	42.234171, -76.578897	3601576892	00979577
Varick	1830	Romulus	Seneca	1,656	31.994	13.676	42.782678, -76.846441	3609976958	00979578
Venice	1823	Scipio	Cayuga	1,236	41.088	0.200	42.722268, -76.543062	3601177024	00979579
Vernon	1802	Augusta and Westmoreland	Oneida	8,318	37.827	0.011	43.065931, -75.529692	3606577123	00979580
Verona	1802	Westmoreland	Oneida	5,974	69.230	0.365	43.159646, -75.627559	3606577178	00979581
Vestal	1823	Union	Broome	29,313	51.742	0.854	42.049395, -76.017594	3600777255	00979582
Veteran	1823	Catharine	Chemung	3,355	38.327	0.143	42.247165, -76.793468	3601577310	00979583
Victor	1812	Bloomfield	Ontario	15,860	35.918	0.013	42.989185, -77.428121	3606977387	00979584
Victory	1821	Cato	Cayuga	1,652	34.394	0.058	43.210319, -76.648094	3601177420	00979585
Vienna	1807	Camden	Oneida	5,260	61.448	33.628	43.232033, -75.770428	3606577486	00979586
Villenova	1823	Hanover	Chautauqua	1,057	36.093	0.111	42.392667, -79.117538	3601377530	00979587
Virgil	1804	Homer	Cortland	2,425	47.363	0.036	42.520399, -76.164441	3602377596	00979588
Volney	1806	Mexico	Oswego	5,671	48.240	0.916	43.360420, -76.369664	3607577662	00979589
Waddington	1859	Madrid	St. Lawrence	2,235	51.606	6.367	44.831296, -75.192048	3608977739	00979590
Wales	1818	Willink	Erie	3,009	35.588	0.051	42.739402, -78.517591	3602977871	00979591
Wallkill	1788	Wallkill Precinct	Orange	30,486	62.107	0.736	41.489363, -74.400492	3607177992	00979592
Walton	1797	Franklin	Delaware	5,270	96.837	0.780	42.173518, -75.126950	3602578047	00979593
Walworth	1829	Ontario	Wayne	9,253	33.853	0.043	43.155050, -77.312509	3611778102	00979594
Wappinger	1875	Fishkill	Dutchess	28,216	27.054	1.477	41.587392, -73.891067	3602778157	00979595
Ward	1856	Alfred and Amity	Allegany	334	29.175	0.017	42.225029, -77.901772	3600378201	00979596
Warren	1796	German Flatts	Herkimer	1,029	37.791	0.319	42.898900, -74.938353	3604378278	00979597
Warrensburg	1813	Thurman	Warren	3,959	63.461	1.338	43.523052, -73.806561	3611378300	00979598
Warsaw	1803	Batavia	Wyoming	5,316	35.416	0.050	42.738212, -78.131734	3612178344	00979599
Warwick	1788	Goshen Precinct	Orange	32,027	101.340	3.546	41.259614, -74.364962	3607178366	00979600
Washington	1788	Clinton Precinct	Dutchess	4,522	58.170	0.714	41.791484, -73.677156	3602778388	00979601
Waterford	1816	Halfmoon	Saratoga	8,208	6.567	0.845	42.804152, -73.687293	3609178531	00979602
Waterloo	1829	Junius	Seneca	7,378	21.668	0.147	42.919388, -76.912599	3609978564	00979603
Watertown	1800	Mexico	Jefferson	5,913	35.926	0.101	43.932813, -75.919026	3604578619	00979605
Watson	1821	Leyden	Lewis	1,802	112.737	2.960	43.829937, -75.236333	3604978729	00979607
Waverly	1880	Dickinson	Franklin	963	125.112	1.294	44.525919, -74.545273	3603378795	00979608
Wawarsing	1806	Rochester	Ulster	12,771	130.505	3.358	41.746881, -74.419590	3611178828	00979609
Wawayanda	1849	Minisink	Orange	7,534	34.720	0.309	41.382931, -74.467685	3607178839	00979610
Wayland	1848	Cohocton and Dansville	Steuben	3,732	38.738	0.600	42.524551, -77.597916	3610178861	00979611
Wayne	1796		Steuben	1,009	20.582	2.014	42.431533, -77.139620	3610178883	00979612
Webb	1896	Wilmurt	Herkimer	1,797	452.284	32.007	43.821971, -75.039894	3604378927	00979613
Webster	1840	Penfield	Monroe	45,327	33.531	1.707	43.230249, -77.445816	3605578971	00979614
Wells	1805	Mayfield and Northampton	Hamilton	683	176.800	1.564	43.475631, -74.285410	3604179059	00979615
Wellsville	1855	Scio	Allegany	7,064	36.646	0.037	42.118425, -77.925276	3600379103	00979616
West Almond	1835	Alfred, Almond and Angelica	Allegany	274	35.995	0.095	42.310960, -77.906467	3600379202	00979617
West Bloomfield	1833	Bloomfield	Ontario	2,740	25.461	0.039	42.891997, -77.501298	3606979356	00979618
West Monroe	1839	Constantia	Oswego	4,088	33.746	4.841	43.305626, -76.089132	3607580500	00979623
West Seneca	1851	Cheektowaga and Hamburg	Erie	45,500	21.357	0.057	42.837777, -78.751233	3602980918	00979626
West Sparta	1846	Sparta	Livingston	1,156	33.450	0.000	42.610449, -77.789193	3605181006	00979627
West Turin	1830	Turin	Lewis	1,692	102.054	0.343	43.593319, -75.507486	3604981094	00979628
West Union	1845	Greenwood	Steuben	343	40.903	0.146	42.044429, -77.687883	3610181105	00979629
Westerlo	1815	Coeymans and Rensselaerville	Albany	3,194	57.791	0.746	42.500334, -74.050291	3600179851	00979619
Western	1797	Steuben	Oneida	1,831	51.206	3.465	43.350032, -75.410715	3606579862	00979620
Westfield	1828	Portland and Ripley	Chautauqua	4,553	47.185	0.066	42.268345, -79.599793	3601379950	00979621
Westford	1808	Worcester	Otsego	804	33.853	0.056	42.643196, -74.816746	3607779972	00979622
Westmoreland	1792	Whitestown	Oneida	5,924	43.136	0.015	43.123668, -75.445878	3606580533	00979624
Westport	1815	Elizabethtown	Essex	1,320	58.171	8.636	44.184305, -73.446482	3603180775	00979625
Westville	1829	Constable	Franklin	1,757	34.798	0.014	44.940496, -74.383478	3603381215	00979630
Wethersfield	1823	Orangeville	Wyoming	755	35.810	0.307	42.647567, -78.244568	3612181325	00979631
Wheatfield	1836	Niagara	Niagara	18,638	27.911	0.680	43.095396, -78.885375	3606381380	00979632
Wheatland	1821	Caledonia	Monroe	4,897	30.411	0.261	43.009181, -77.815932	3605581402	00979633
Wheeler	1820	Bath and Prattsburgh	Steuben	1,136	46.066	0.061	42.436941, -77.339222	3610181457	00979634
White Creek	1815	Cambridge	Washington	3,275	47.923	0.053	42.993109, -73.322229	3611581578	00979635
Whitehall	1788	Whitehall township	Washington	4,023	57.176	1.729	43.539138, -73.385099	3611581633	00979636
Whitestown/Whitesboro	1788		Oneida	18,118	27.318	0.002	43.135740, -75.335911	3606581754	00979638
Willet	1818	Cincinnatus	Cortland	894	25.733	0.321	42.453678, -75.920196	3602381963	00979639
Williamson	1802	Sodus	Wayne	6,860	34.640	0.015	43.245563, -77.193969	3611782040	00979640
Williamstown	1804	Mexico	Oswego	1,335	38.672	0.491	43.455121, -75.887933	3607582073	00979641
Willing	1852	Independence and Scio	Allegany	1,281	36.240	0.030	42.035947, -77.893373	3600382095	00979642
Willsboro	1788	Crown Point township	Essex	1,905	42.723	30.661	44.385498, -73.398703	3603182271	00979643
Wilmington	1821	Jay	Essex	1,139	65.240	0.233	44.372798, -73.892043	3603182315	00979644
Wilna	1813	Le Ray and Leyden	Jefferson	5,732	78.623	0.878	44.056111, -75.589099	3604582348	00979645
Wilson	1818	Porter	Niagara	5,847	49.405	2.057	43.272672, -78.812943	3606382370	00979646
Wilton	1818	Northumberland	Saratoga	17,361	35.834	0.118	43.152604, -73.726967	3609182403	00979647
Windham	1798	Woodstock	Greene	1,708	45.200	0.137	42.318072, -74.218391	3603982480	00979648
Windsor	1807	Chenango	Broome	5,804	91.743	1.264	42.063826, -75.672418	3600782535	00979649
Winfield	1816	Litchfield, Plainfield and Richfield	Herkimer	1,897	23.639	0.012	42.897097, -75.165933	3604382568	00979650
Wirt	1838	Bolivar and Friendship	Allegany	1,049	35.938	0.066	42.124500, -78.134087	3600382623	00979651
Wolcott	1807	Junius	Wayne	4,002	39.050	0.901	43.273626, -76.765497	3611782689	00979652
Woodbury	1890	Monroe	Orange	12,197	36.124	1.076	41.327783, -74.101891	3607182755	00979653
Woodhull	1828	Addison and Troupsburg	Steuben	1,665	55.390	0.033	42.050282, -77.394395	3610182843	00979654
Woodstock	1788	Woodstock township	Ulster	6,287	67.289	0.544	42.057837, -74.166644	3611183052	00979655
Worcester	1797	Cherry Valley	Otsego	2,112	46.710	0.163	42.582621, -74.724039	3607783129	00979656
Worth	1848	Lorraine	Jefferson	198	43.218	0.086	43.743590, -75.844697	3604583162	00979657
Wright	1846	Schoharie	Schoharie	1,516	28.636	0.082	42.673493, -74.207635	3609583195	00979658
Yates	1822	Ridgeway	Orleans	2,567	37.387	0.000	43.339463, -78.388285	3607383448	00979659
York	1819	Caledonia and Leicester	Livingston	3,182	49.100	0.007	42.866835, -77.888813	3605184022	00979661
Yorkshire	1820	Ischua	Cattaraugus	3,827	36.249	0.145	42.479169, -78.520073	3600984055	00979662
Yorktown	1788		Westchester	36,569	36.645	2.612	41.269857, -73.817867	3611984077	00979663

== Extremes in size and population ==
Some towns in New York, particularly in the North Country and on Long Island, cover very large areas. Four towns have larger area than New York City: Ohio and Webb in Herkimer County and Arietta and Long Lake in Hamilton County. All four are within Adirondack State Park and are sparsely populated.

- Smallest town by area: Green Island, Albany County – 0.747 square miles (1.93 km^{2})
- Largest town by area: Webb, Herkimer County – 452.284 square miles (1,171.41 km^{2})
- Smallest town by population: Red House, Cattaraugus County - 27 (2020)
- Largest town by population: Hempstead, Nassau County - 793,409 (2020)

Green Island is a coterminous town-village. Webb and Red House contain no villages. The 22 villages within the town of Hempstead are included in its population total.

== See also ==
- Administrative divisions of New York
- List of counties in New York
- List of municipalities in New York
- List of census-designated places in New York
- List of American Indian Reservations in New York (state)
