= West Union, New York =

- Town
- Location within the state of New York
- Coordinates: 42°3′14″N 77°41′53″W
- Country: United States
- State: New York
- County: Steuben

Area
  - Total: 41.05 sq mi (106.32 km^{2})
  - Land: 40.90 sq mi (105.94 km^{2})
  - Water: 0.15 sq mi (0.38 km^{2})
- Elevation: 2,336 ft (712 m)

Population (2020)
  - Total: 343
  - Density: 8.4/sq mi (3.23/km^{2})
- Time zone: UTC-5 (Eastern (EST))
  - Summer (DST): UTC-4 (EDT)
- FIPS code: 36-81105
- GNIS feature ID: 0979629

West Union is a town in Steuben County, New York, United States. The population was 343 as of the 2020 decennial census.

The Town of West Union is in the southwest corner of the county and south of the city of Hornell, New York.

== History ==
West Union was formed from part of the Town of Greenwood in 1845. Originally the names "Green" and "Union" were proposed for the town, but both names were deemed unsuitable due to other towns in the state using those names, in, respectively, Chenango County and Broome County.

== Geography ==
According to the United States Census Bureau, the town has a total area of 41.1 square miles (106 km^{2}), of which 41.0 square miles (106 km^{2}) is land and 0.1 square miles (0.26 km^{2}) (0.19%) is water.

The western town line is the border of Allegany County, and the southern town line is the border of Pennsylvania (Potter County).

New York State Route 248 passes through the town.

== Demographics ==
Historical population
| Census | Pop. | Note | %± |
|---|---|---|---|
| 1850 | 950 | | — |
| 1860 | 1,392 | | 46.5% |
| 1870 | 1,204 | | −13.5% |
| 1880 | 1,271 | | 5.6% |
| 1890 | 1,167 | | −8.2% |
| 1900 | 1,025 | | −12.2% |
| 1910 | 985 | | −3.9% |
| 1920 | 781 | | −20.7% |
| 1930 | 715 | | −8.5% |
| 1940 | 630 | | −11.9% |
| 1950 | 504 | | −20.0% |
| 1960 | 430 | | −14.7% |
| 1970 | 426 | | −0.9% |
| 1980 | 431 | | 1.2% |
| 1990 | 412 | | −4.4% |
| 2000 | 399 | | −3.2% |
| 2010 | 312 | | −21.8% |
| 2020 | 343 | | 9.9% |
U.S. Decennial Census

As of the census of 2000, there were 399 people, 141 households, and 112 families residing in the town. The population density was 9.7 people per square mile (3.7 people/km^{2}). There were 279 housing units at an average density of 6.8 per square mile (2.6/km^{2}). The racial makeup of the town was 98.75% White, 0.75% Native American, 0.50% from other races. Hispanic or Latino of any race were 1.25% of the population.

There were 141 households, out of which 32.6% had children under the age of 18 living with them, 68.8% were married couples living together, 6.4% had a female householder with no husband present, and 19.9% were non-families. 14.2% of all households were made up of individuals, and 4.3% had someone living alone who was 65 years of age or older. The average household size was 2.83 and the average family size was 3.12.

In the town, the population was spread out, with 23.6% under the age of 18, 10.0% from 18 to 24, 27.3% from 25 to 44, 30.6% from 45 to 64, and 8.5% who were 65 years of age or older. The median age was 40 years. For every 100 females, there were 113.4 males. For every 100 females age 18 and over, there were 111.8 males.

The median income for a household in the town was $36,000, and the median income for a family was $45,313. Males had a median income of $27,143 versus $21,250 for females. The per capita income for the town was $14,061. About 6.8% of families and 10.8% of the population were below the poverty line, including 9.0% of those under age 18 and none of those age 65 or over.

== Communities and locations in the Town of West Union ==
- Barney Mills – A hamlet on NY-248 near the northern town line.
- Marsh Creek – A stream flowing out the west side of the town past McGraws.
- McGraws – A hamlet south of West Union hamlet on NY-248.
- Rexville – A hamlet on County Road 117 in the east part of the town.
- West Union – The hamlet of West Union is in the northwest corner of the town on County Road 60 (Christian Hollow-West Union Road).
- Wileyville – A hamlet on County Road 84 in the south part of the town.
- Wileyville Creek – A stream flowing past Wileyville out the west side of the town.
