= Jasper, New York =

- Town
- Location within the state of New York
- Coordinates: 42°8′38″N 77°32′1″W
- Country: United States
- State: New York
- County: Steuben

Area
  - Total: 52.66 sq mi (136.40 km^{2})
  - Land: 52.65 sq mi (136.35 km^{2})
  - Water: 0.023 sq mi (0.06 km^{2})
- Elevation: 1,870 ft (570 m)

Population (2020)
  - Total: 1,418 ▼
  - Estimate (2021): 1,404
  - Density: 26.6/sq mi (10.28/km^{2})
- Time zone: UTC-5 (Eastern (EST))
  - Summer (DST): UTC-4 (EDT)
- ZIP code: 14855
- Area code: 607
- FIPS code: 36-38319
- GNIS feature ID: 0979103

Jasper is a town located in Steuben County, New York, United States. As of the 2020 census, the town had a total population of 1,418. The name is that of a military hero at Fort Moultrie, William Jasper.

The Town of Jasper is in the southwestern part of the county, west of Corning. The town's Zip Code is 14855.

== History ==
The first settlers arrived circa 1807.

The town was formed in 1837 from parts of the Towns of Troupsburg and Canisteo, but yielded territory to form part of the Town of Greenwood in 1848. Noted ceramics artist Frederick Walrath was born in Jasper in 1871, and grew up there. He died after being stricken while on a visit home in 1921.

== Geography ==
According to the United States Census Bureau, the town has a total area of 52.7 square miles (136 km^{2}), of which, 52.7 square miles (136 km^{2}) of it is land and none of the area is covered with water.

New York State Route 417, an east–west highway, is briefly joined with New York State Route 36, a north–south highway, near Jasper village.

== Demographics ==
Historical population
Census	Pop.	Note	%±
1830	657		—
1840	1,187		80.7%
1850	1,749		47.3%
1860	1,850		5.8%
1870	1,683		−9.0%
1880	1,806		7.3%
1890	1,690		−6.4%
1900	1,430		−15.4%
1910	1,264		−11.6%
1920	943		−25.4%
1930	986		4.6%
1940	967		−1.9%
1950	983		1.7%
1960	1,008		2.5%
1970	1,042		3.4%
1980	1,128		8.3%
1990	1,232		9.2%
2000	1,270		3.1%
2010	1,424		12.1%
2020	1,418		−0.4%
2021 (est.)	1,404		−1.0%
U.S. Decennial Census

As of the census of 2000, there were 1,270 people, 403 households, and 324 families residing in the town. The population density was 24.1 inhabitants per square mile (9.3/km^{2}). There were 521 housing units at an average density of 9.9 per square mile (3.8/km^{2}). The racial makeup of the town was 98.27% White, 0.31% African American, 0.00% Native American, 0.71% Asian, 0.00% Pacific Islander, 0.08% from other races, and 0.63% from two or more races. 0.24% of the population were Hispanic or Latino of any race.

There were 403 households, out of which 42.7% had children under the age of 18 living with them, 67.7% were married couples living together, 6.7% had a female householder with no husband present, and 19.4% were non-families. 14.9% of all households were made up of individuals, and 7.7% had someone living alone who was 65 years of age or older. The average household size was 3.15 and the average family size was 3.51.

In the town, the population was spread out, with 33.2% under the age of 18, 9.6% from 18 to 24, 25.4% from 25 to 44, 21.6% from 45 to 64, and 10.2% who were 65 years of age or older. The median age was 31 years. For every 100 females, there were 103.2 males. For every 100 females age 18 and over, there were 100.9 males.

The median income for a household in the town was $33,393, and the median income for a family was $35,962. Males had a median income of $28,375 versus $21,875 for females. The per capita income for the town was $13,194. 20.6% of the population and 15.7% of families were below the poverty line. Out of the total population, 30.2% of those under the age of 18 and 6.1% of those 65 and older were living below the poverty line.

The area also has a significant Amish population.

== Communities and locations in the Town of Jasper ==
- Dennis Corners – a location east of Hampshire on County Road 72
- Five Corners – a hamlet southeast of Jasper village on NY-417 by Tuscarora Creek
- Hampshire – a hamlet north of Jasper village on NY-36
- Jasper – the hamlet of Jasper is on NY-417 by Tuscarora Creek
- Tuscarora Creek – a stream flowing out the southeast part of the town
