= Troupsburg, New York =

- Town
- Location within the state of New York Troupsburg (the United States)
- Coordinates: 42°2′59″N 77°32′53″W
- Country: United States
- State: New York
- County: Steuben

Area
  - Total: 61.27 sq mi (158.68 km^{2})
  - Land: 61.24 sq mi (158.61 km^{2})
  - Water: 0.027 sq mi (0.07 km^{2})
- Elevation: 1,634 ft (498 m)

Population (2020)
  - Total: 1,016 ▼
  - Estimate (2021): 1,006
  - Density: 20.9/sq mi (8.08/km^{2})
- Time zone: UTC-5 (Eastern (EST))
  - Summer (DST): UTC-4 (EDT)
- ZIP code: 14885
- Area code: 607
- FIPS code: 36-75440
- GNIS feature ID: 0979558
- Website: https://townoftroupsburgny.gov/

Troupsburg is a town in Steuben County, New York, United States. The population was 1,016 at the 2020 census. The town is named after Robert Troup, an agent of the Pulteney Estate.

The Town of Troupsburg is on the southern border of Steuben County, south of Hornell.

== History ==
The first settler arrived in 1805.

The town was formed (as "Troupsburgh") from the Towns of Canisteo and Addison on February 12, 1808.

The Honorable Colonel Robert Troup, Esq. served in the American Revolution in addition to being a federal judge and later land agent for the Pulteney Estate. The Pulteney Estate was a large tract of land stretching from Sodus Bay on Lake Ontario south to the Pennsylvania border. Its western border was the Genesee River and its eastern border was Seneca Lake. Troup took over as land agent for the Pulteney Estate after its first agent, Charles Williamson, fell out of favor with the estate owners due to large debts he incurred in an attempt to develop the land.

Additional territory was added to Troupsburg from Canisteo in 1818.

Troupsburg was subsequently diminished by contributing land to the Towns of Greenwood, New York and Jasper in 1827, and again to aid the formation of the Town of Woodhull in 1828.

== Geography ==
According to the United States Census Bureau, the town has a total area of 61.3 square miles (159 km^{2}), of which 61.2 square miles (159 km^{2}) is land and 0.02% is water.

The southern town line is the border with Pennsylvania (Tioga County). The town is known for higher elevation than other towns in the county.

New York State Route 36 is a north-south highway in the town.

== Demographics ==
Historical population
Census	Pop.	Note	%±
1820	650		—
1830	666		2.5%
1840	1,171		75.8%
1850	1,754		49.8%
1860	2,096		19.5%
1870	2,281		8.8%
1880	2,494		9.3%
1890	2,174		−12.8%
1900	2,015		−7.3%
1910	1,712		−15.0%
1920	1,406		−17.9%
1930	1,124		−20.1%
1940	1,131		0.6%
1950	1,092		−3.4%
1960	1,074		−1.6%
1970	1,004		−6.5%
1980	1,005		0.1%
1990	1,006		0.1%
2000	1,126		11.9%
2010	1,291		14.7%
2020	1,016		−21.3%
2021 (est.)	1,006		−1.0%
U.S. Decennial Census

As of the census of 2000, there were 1,126 people, 380 households, and 283 families residing in the town. The population density was 18.4 inhabitants per square mile (7.1/km^{2}). There were 497 housing units at an average density of 8.1 per square mile (3.1/km^{2}). The racial makeup of the town was 97.87% White, 0.18% African American, 0.62% Asian, 1.15% from other races, and 0.18% from two or more races. Hispanic or Latino of any race were 1.24% of the population.

There were 380 households, out of which 38.7% had children under the age of 18 living with them, 63.2% were married couples living together, 7.6% had a female householder with no husband present, and 25.3% were non-families. 20.5% of all households were made up of individuals, and 9.7% had someone living alone who was 65 years of age or older. The average household size was 2.96 and the average family size was 3.46.

In the town, the population was spread out, with 32.8% under the age of 18, 8.0% from 18 to 24, 26.8% from 25 to 44, 20.9% from 45 to 64, and 11.5% who were 65 years of age or older. The median age was 32 years. For every 100 females, there were 93.5 males. For every 100 females age 18 and over, there were 99.2 males.

The median income for a household in the town was $30,714, and the median income for a family was $37,159. Males had a median income of $25,761 versus $21,250 for females. The per capita income for the town was $11,982. About 14.3% of families and 19.7% of the population were below the poverty line, including 26.3% of those under age 18 and 11.8% of those age 65 or over.

== Communities and locations in the Town of Troupsburg ==
- Alice – A hamlet in the south part of the town, west of Lila on Route 84.
- High Up – A location in the northwest corner of the town on County Road 126.
- Lila – A hamlet in the south part of the town on Route 84.
- South Troupsburg – A hamlet in the south central part of the town on NY-36.
- Troupsburg – The hamlet of Troupsburg, located in the center of the town on State Route 36.
- Troups Creek – A stream which is the primary body of water that runs in a southern direction. It is not navigable because of its shallow depth. It follows the same route as NY-36, passing both Troupsburg village and South Troupsburg.
- Young Hickory – A location in the western part of the town on County Route 117.
