= Greenwood, New York =

- Town
- Location within the state of New York
- Coordinates: 42°8′16″N 77°40′40″W
- Country: United States
- State: New York
- County: Steuben

Area
  - Total: 41.35 sq mi (107.09 km^{2})
  - Land: 41.34 sq mi (107.07 km^{2})
  - Water: 0.0077 sq mi (0.02 km^{2})
- Elevation: 2,014 ft (614 m)

Population (2020)
  - Total: 771 ▼
  - Estimate (2021): 762
  - Density: 18.8/sq mi (7.25/km^{2})
- Time zone: UTC-5 (Eastern (EST))
  - Summer (DST): UTC-4 (EDT)
- ZIP code: 14839
- Area code: 607
- FIPS code: 36-30741
- GNIS feature ID: 0979025
- Website: https://greenwoodny.gov/

Greenwood is a town in Steuben County, New York, United States. The population was 771 at the 2020 census.

== History ==
A pioneer road was cut through the town in the 18th century, but no settlers remained in the town. The first permanent settlers arrived around 1820. Salt production was an early industry. The main industry today is deer hunting, for which the town claims to be the top deer-take town in New York State.

Greenwood was formed in 1827 from the towns of Canisteo and Troupsburg. Part of Greenwood was used to form the Town of West Union in 1845, but territory was regained from the Town of Jasper in 1848.

From November 16, 1896, through June 1936, Greenwood was served by the New York & Pennsylvania Railway (and predecessors) as part of its Canisteo NY to Ceres NY (via Greenwood NY, Genesee PA, Oswayo and Shinglehouse PA) main line. Following severe floods in July 1935 the railroad was partially out of service and its abandonment in June 1936 was readily approved by the Interstate Commerce Commission which from an early date approved railroad abandonment to promote highway truck use. The loss of railroad service did much to promote the economic withering of the Greenwood area.

By the early 20th century, agriculture had established itself as the primary economic activity in the town. Farming has since declined significantly, as in many parts of rural America, and forest cover has largely returned to many areas.

Also contributing to Greenwood's decline was the decision, when the Southern Tier Expressway (New York Route 17, now Interstate 86) was being planned in the 1960s, to route the road through the Hornell-Arkport area, as it was considered to have more potential for development than Jasper-Greenwood. The former road is now New York Route 417.

In 1967, Harold Mason, a librarian and antiquarian bookseller, founded (in Greenwood) the Greenwood Press, specializing in the reprinting of out-of-print books. The company was sold in 1969, and Mason left it in 1973. It is now the Greenwood Publishing Group, part of ABC-CLIO/Greenwood. It has had no connection with the town of Greenwood since the 1970s.

In 2004, Greenwood's schools merged with the larger, adjacent Canisteo school system.

== Geography ==
According to the United States Census Bureau, the town has a total area of 41.3 square miles (107 km^{2}), all land.

New York State Route 248 (north-south) and New York State Route 417 intersect north of Greenwood village.

== Adjacent towns ==
The northern border is the Town of Hartsville and Town of Canisteo, and the southern border is the Town of West Union and the Town of Troupsburg. The western border is the Town of Andover in Allegany County, and the eastern border is the Town of Jasper.

== Demographics ==
Historical population
Census	Pop.	Note	%±
1830	852		—
1840	1,138		33.6%
1850	1,185		4.1%
1860	1,306		10.2%
1870	1,394		6.7%
1880	1,386		−0.6%
1890	1,312		−5.3%
1900	1,129		−13.9%
1910	1,111		−1.6%
1920	941		−15.3%
1930	968		2.9%
1940	914		−5.6%
1950	872		−4.6%
1960	839		−3.8%
1970	845		0.7%
1980	883		4.5%
1990	898		1.7%
2000	849		−5.5%
2010	801		−5.7%
2020	771		−3.7%
2021 (est.)	762		−1.2%
U.S. Decennial Census

As of the census of 2000, there were 849 people, 325 households, and 231 families residing in the town. The population density was 20.6 inhabitants per square mile (8.0/km^{2}). There were 439 housing units at an average density of 10.6 per square mile (4.1/km^{2}). The racial makeup of the town was 98.23% White, 0.24% African American, 0.12% Native American, 0.35% from other races, and 1.06% from two or more races. Hispanic or Latino of any race were 0.24% of the population.

There were 325 households, out of which 32.0% had children under the age of 18 living with them, 59.1% were married couples living together, 7.1% had a female householder with no husband present, and 28.9% were non-families. 25.8% of all households were made up of individuals, and 12.9% had someone living alone who was 65 years of age or older. The average household size was 2.61 and the average family size was 3.10.

In the town, the population was spread out, with 27.1% under the age of 18, 8.5% from 18 to 24, 23.8% from 25 to 44, 27.4% from 45 to 64, and 13.2% who were 65 years of age or older. The median age was 38 years. For every 100 females, there were 104.6 males. For every 100 females age 18 and over, there were 103.6 males.

The median income for a household in the town was $29,750, and the median income for a family was $37,841. Males had a median income of $28,250 versus $18,750 for females. The per capita income for the town was $13,578. About 19.0% of families and 19.5% of the population were below the poverty line, including 28.6% of those under age 18 and 16.4% of those age 65 or over.

== Communities and locations in the Town of Greenwood ==
- Bennetts – A hamlet on State Route 248 at the north town line.
- Bennetts Creek – A tributary of the Canisteo River, flowing northward through the middle of the town.
- Greenwood – The hamlet of Greenwood is at the junction of State Routes 417 and 248 in the eastern part of the town.
- Rough and Ready – A hamlet south of Greenwood village near the south town line.
- West Greenwood – A hamlet on State Route 417, west of Greenwood village and near the west town line.
