= Randolph, New York (disambiguation) =

There are two places named Randolph in the U.S. state of New York:

- Randolph (town), New York
- Randolph (village), New York

== See also ==
- East Randolph, New York
