= Conewango, New York =

- Town
- Location within New York Location within the United States
- Coordinates: 42°13′22″N 78°59′28″W
- Country: United States
- State: New York
- County: Cattaraugus

Area
  - Total: 36.14 sq mi (93.59 km^{2})
  - Land: 36.12 sq mi (93.54 km^{2})
  - Water: 0.023 sq mi (0.06 km^{2})
- Elevation: 1,339 ft (408 m)

Population (2020)
  - Total: 1,794
  - Estimate (2021): 1,779
  - Density: 50.8/sq mi (19.61/km^{2})
- Time zone: UTC-5 (Eastern (EST))
  - Summer (DST): UTC-4 (EDT)
- ZIP Codes: 14726 (Conewango Valley); 14772 (Randolph); 14747 (Kennedy); 14719 (Cattaraugus)
- Area code: 716
- FIPS code: 36-009-17684
- GNIS feature ID: 0978860

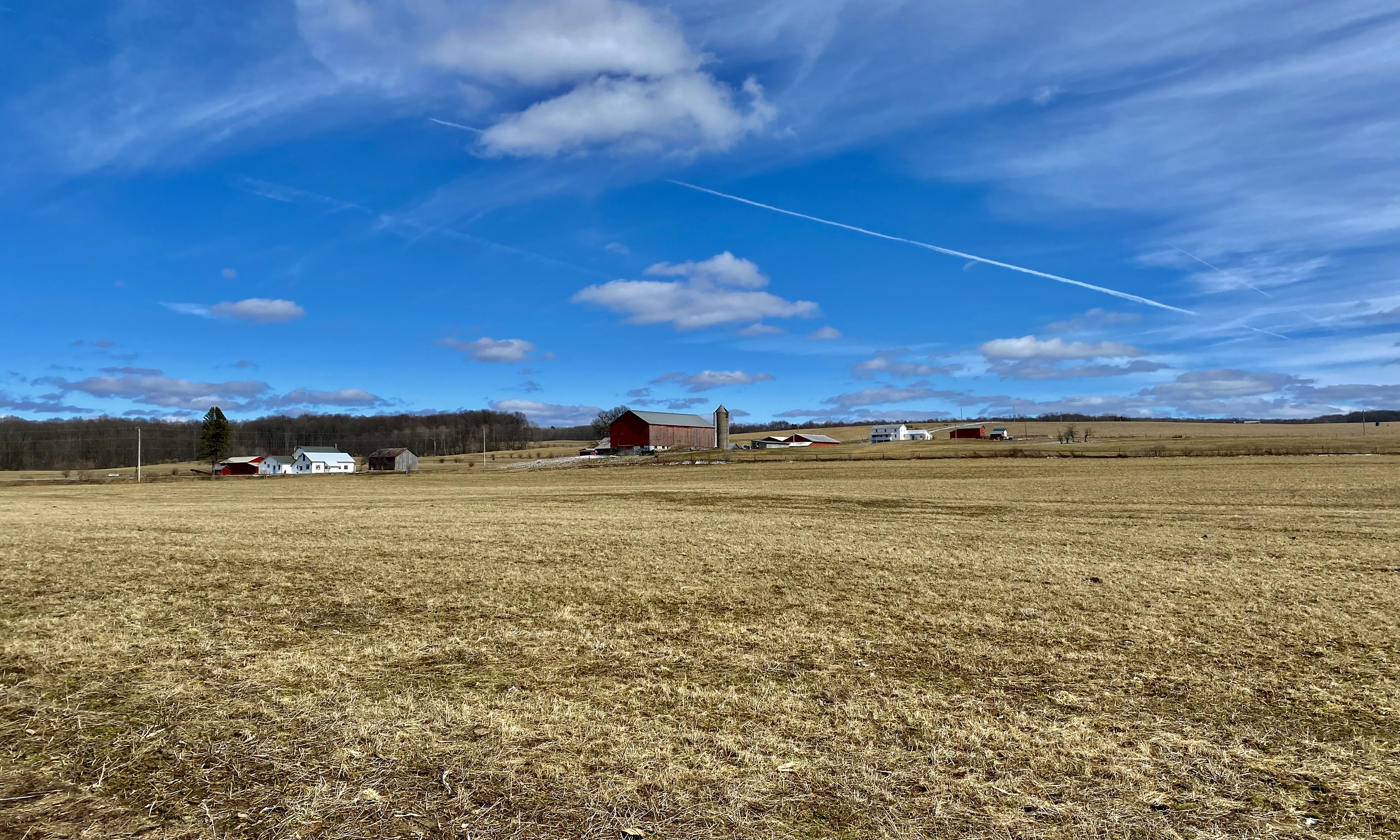

Conewango is a town in Cattaraugus County, New York, United States. The population was 1,794 at the 2020 census. The town is named after a creek which flows through the town.

The town is on the west border of the county and is northeast of Jamestown.

== History ==
The name is supposed to mean "walking slowly" in the native language, related to the slow-moving creek. The area of the town was first settled circa 1816. The Town of Conewango was established in 1823 from a part of the town of Little Valley. In 1826, part of Conewango was used to form the town of Randolph, and another part was used in 1832 to make the town of Leon.

== Geography ==
According to the United States Census Bureau, the town has a total area of 36.14 square miles (93.59 km^{2}), of which 36.12 square miles (93.54 km^{2}) is land and 0.02 square miles (0.06 km^{2}), or 0.06%, is water.

The west town line is the border of Chautauqua County.

Conewango Creek flows through the town, exiting near the southwest corner.

U.S. Route 62 and New York State Route 241 pass through the town. New York State Route 394 crosses the southeast corner.

=== Adjacent towns and areas ===
The town of Ellington in Chautauqua County is to the west. The town of Randolph is to the south, and the town of Leon is to the north. The east border is formed with the town of Napoli.

== Demographics ==
Historical population
| Census | Pop. | Note | %± |
|---|---|---|---|
| 1830 | 1,712 | | — |
| 1840 | 1,317 | | −23.1% |
| 1850 | 1,408 | | 6.9% |
| 1860 | 1,359 | | −3.5% |
| 1870 | 1,281 | | −5.7% |
| 1880 | 1,299 | | 1.4% |
| 1890 | 1,273 | | −2.0% |
| 1900 | 1,224 | | −3.8% |
| 1910 | 1,098 | | −10.3% |
| 1920 | 931 | | −15.2% |
| 1930 | 1,011 | | 8.6% |
| 1940 | 952 | | −5.8% |
| 1950 | 1,045 | | 9.8% |
| 1960 | 1,162 | | 11.2% |
| 1970 | 1,393 | | 19.9% |
| 1980 | 1,578 | | 13.3% |
| 1990 | 1,702 | | 7.9% |
| 2000 | 1,732 | | 1.8% |
| 2010 | 1,857 | | 7.2% |
| 2020 | 1,794 | | −3.4% |
| 2021 (est.) | 1,779 | | −0.8% |
U.S. Decennial Census

As of the census of 2000, there were 1,732 people, 509 households, and 403 families residing in the town. The population density was 47.9 inhabitants per square mile (18.5/km^{2}). There were 602 housing units at an average density of 16.7 per square mile (6.4/km^{2}). The racial makeup of the town was 98.09% White, 0.17% African American, 0.81% Native American, 0.17% from other races, and 0.75% from two or more races. Hispanic or Latino of any race were 0.40% of the population.

There were 509 households, out of which 43.8% had children under the age of 18 living with them, 65.0% were married couples living together, 8.3% had a female householder with no husband present, and 20.8% were non-families. 16.9% of all households were made up of individuals, and 6.3% had someone living alone who was 65 years of age or older. The average household size was 3.40 and the average family size was 3.86.

In the town, the population was spread out, with 40.1% under the age of 18, 6.6% from 18 to 24, 25.5% from 25 to 44, 19.7% from 45 to 64, and 8.0% who were 65 years of age or older. The median age was 29 years. For every 100 females, there were 107.7 males. For every 100 females age 18 and over, there were 97.0 males.

The median income for a household in the town was $34,491, and the median income for a family was $36,719. Males had a median income of $31,435 versus $20,417 for females. The per capita income for the town was $13,667. About 16.5% of families and 23.6% of the population were below the poverty line, including 34.4% of those under age 18 and 15.0% of those age 65 or over.

Much of the county's sizable Amish population resides in Conewango.

== Notable people ==
- Leigh G. Kirkland, former New York state senator
- Bill Rexford, 1950 NASCAR Grand National Champion

== Communities and locations in Conewango ==
- Axeville – A hamlet in the northeast corner of the town on County Road 40. An early settler was an axe maker.
- Clear Creek – A hamlet on the west town line, southwest of Conewango village and south of Conewango Valley.
- Conewango – The hamlet of Conewango, a former station on the Erie Railroad, is in the northwest part of the town on U.S. Route 62, NY Route 241, and County Road 40.
- Conewango Creek – The principal stream in the region, primarily in Chautauqua County. The name means "walking slowly".
- Conewango Swamp Wildlife Management Area – A conservation tract in the southeast part of the town.
- Conewango Valley – A hamlet straddling the county line, west of Conewango village on Route 62. Conewango Valley is the site of the town's post office, which merged with its Chautauqua County counterpart in the 1960s.
- East Randolph – Part of the hamlet (former village) of East Randolph is in the southeast part of the town at NY Route 394 and County Road 7.
- Elm Creek – A former community by the east town line on the stream Elk Creek.
- Pope – A location in the center of the town on Route 241.
- Rutledge – a former community in the southwestern part of the town.
