= Percy Crowley Adams =

Washington, D.C architect

- Born: April 4, 1869; Randolph, New York, United States
- Died: September 8, 1953 (aged 84); Washington, D.C., United States
- Education: Cornell University
- Occupation: Architect
- Notable work: See list
- Children: 2
- Practice: Averill, Hall & Adams; Averill & Adams; Upman & Adams; Allied Architects of Washington, D.C.
- Buildings: Longworth House Office Building; Avalon Theater; Rixey Mansion (now Marymount University main building); Apartment Building, 1509 16th Street NW; Auto Show Room, 1365–1367 H Street NE

Percy Crowley Adams AIA (April 4, 1869-September 8, 1953) was an architect who was active in the Washington, D.C. area.

Four buildings that he designed, or helped to design, are on the National Register of Historic Places including the Longworth House Office Building.

== Early life and education ==
Adams was born in Randolph, New York where he attended Chamberlain Institute high school. He received a Bachelor's degree in Architecture from Cornell University.

== Career ==
Adams moved to Washington, D.C. in 1897 where worked as a draftsman for the Office of the Supervising Architect of the U.S. Treasury. He designed government buildings including post offices and courthouses.

In 1909, he co-founded the architecture form of Averill, Hall & Adams, later known as Averill & Adams. The firm designed mostly residential buildings including apartment buildings and homes.

Adams was awarded the opportunity to create viewing stands for Woodrow Wilson's second inauguration in 1917.

Adams frequently worked with Frank Upman and, in 1924, formally established the firm of Upman & Adams. Upman and Adams designed residential homes, commercial buildings and schools. The firm designed the Rixey Mansion in Arlington, Virginia, which is now the main building at Marymount University.

In 1925, Adams co-founded the Allied Architects of Washington, D.C., Inc. along with other prominent architects. While with this group, he helped design the Longworth House Office Building, a United States Congressional office building.

Prior to his retirement in 1951, Adams was the oldest practicing architect in Washington, DC.

== Personal life ==
Adams had two children.

== Death ==
Adams died in 1953 in Washington, D.C.

== Notable projects ==
=== National Register of Historic Places (NRHP) ===
- Apartment Building (1909) 1509 16th Street, NW, Washington, DC
- Avalon Theater (1922) 5612 Connecticut Ave., NW, Washington, DC
- Longworth House Office Building (1932) in collaboration with Allied Architects
- Auto Show Room (1927) 1365-1367 H Street NE
