= Chadakoin River =

Chadakoin
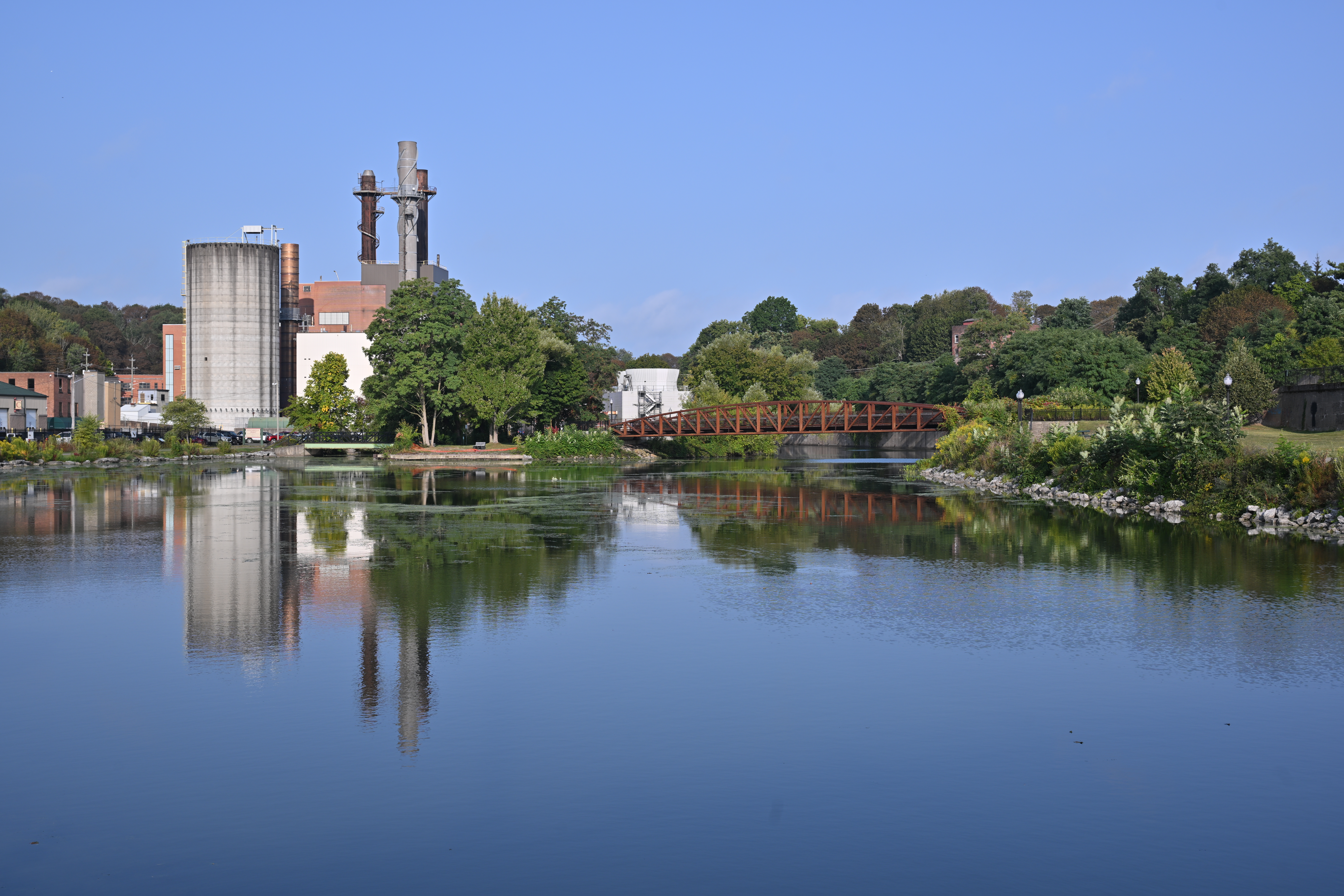
- Chadakoin River above Warner Dam

- Chadakoin River (red)
- Etymology: Iroquoian word of uncertain translation

Location
- Country: United States
- State: New York

Physical characteristics
- Source: Chautauqua Lake
  - location: New York
  - coordinates: 42°6′42″N 79°16′14″W
  - elevation: 1,308 ft (399 m)
- Source confluence: Cassadaga Creek
  - location: Falconer, New York
  - coordinates: 42°7′54″N 79°10′48″W
  - elevation: 1,257 ft (383 m)
- Mouth: Conewango Creek
  - location: Frewsburg, New York
  - coordinates: 42°5′30″N 79°8′11″W
  - elevation: 1,238 ft (377 m)
- Length: 7.8 mi (12.6 km)
- Basin size: 192 sq mi (500 km^{2})
- Discharge
  - location: Falconer, 1.8 miles (2.9 km) upstream from mouth
  - average: 370 cu ft/s (10 m^{3}/s)
  - minimum: 0 cu ft/s (0 m^{3}/s) (July 30, 2011)
  - maximum: 2,250 cu ft/s (64 m^{3}/s) (September 14, 1979)

Basin features
- Tributaries
  - left: Cassadaga Creek

The Chadakoin River is a 7.8-mile-long (12.6 km) stream that is a tributary of the Conewango Creek. The Chadakoin lies entirely in Chautauqua County in Western New York in the United States.

The stream drains an area of 192 square miles (500 km^{2}), covering much of Chautauqua County. The creek begins at the southern end of Chautauqua Lake. Its watershed is bounded to the north by the Chautauqua Ridge, a continental divide that results in the water flowing eventually to the Gulf of Mexico rather than the nearby Great Lakes.

== History ==
Little is known about the indigenous population around the river before the 17th century; it was likely inhabited by either the Erie or the Wenro. Étienne Brûlé, the first European to explore the area, did not document what tribes lived there when he passed through in 1615. The Seneca people of the Haudenosaunee Confederacy invaded the region in the 1650s as part of the Beaver Wars. The Chadakoin was part of their water route system that connected the Great Lakes and Canada with Pennsylvania and destinations further south.

The first recorded European exploration of the Chadakoin was by Pierre Joseph Céloron de Blainville. To strengthen France's claim to the Ohio Valley, Céloron carried out an expedition in the summer of 1749. The expedition from Montreal landed on the shore of Lake Erie, at the mouth of Chautauqua Creek in present-day Westfield, New York. The expedition carried their boats and equipment overland to Chautauqua Lake, then followed the Chadakoin River and Conewango Creek to the Allegheny River, reaching it on July 29, 1749. The name Chadakoin is an English transliteration of the French word Tchadakoin, which is the French pronunciation of Seneca/Erie word Jahdahgwah, the base word from which we get Chautauqua.

The site for Jamestown was chosen in the early 1800s on the Chadakoin as a source of water power for mills. Later, flat-bottomed boats brought manufactured goods from downstream to the growing village. Jamestown's mills shipped lumber downstream. Upstream traffic stopped about 1825, and by 1840, downstream commerce had ended.

As Jamestown became more populated, the area around the Chadakoin became the city's industrial core. The river, especially below Warner Dam, was hidden by factories, and buildings covered sections of the river. Neglected, the river became polluted and its banks were littered with trash.

The first few miles of the river, from Chautauqua Lake to Jamestown at the Fairmount Avenue bridge, are locally referred to as "The Outlet" and have been continuously used for water recreation, such as boating, canoeing, and kayaking. The marsh areas along this length of the Chadakoin hold many birds and other animals. Revitalizing the riverfront that runs through Jamestown has recently received more attention to increasing public access to the Chadakoin River by creating small parks and a pedestrian trail. Recent cleanup efforts and the demolition of abandoned factory buildings have opened up the Chadakoin below Warner Dam to limited kayaking.

Historically, the river has been dyed green for Saint Patrick's Day celebrations in the city, a tradition that ended after the 2012 event due to budget cuts. The dyeing of the river resumed in 2018.

The Greater Jamestown Riverwalk is a series of parks and hiking trails along the Chadakoin River in the City of Jamestown.

== Course ==
Flowing entirely within Chautauqua County, New York, the Chadakoin River begins by emptying Chautauqua Lake at Celoron. It then flows generally eastward through the City of Jamestown to Falconer where it is joined by a major tributary, Cassadaga Creek, four miles (6.4 km) east of Jamestown in Levant, in the town of Ellicott, New York. The river then flows south to Frewsburg where it empties into the Conewango Creek, which then flows southward into Pennsylvania and joins the Allegheny River at the city of Warren, Pennsylvania.

== River modifications ==
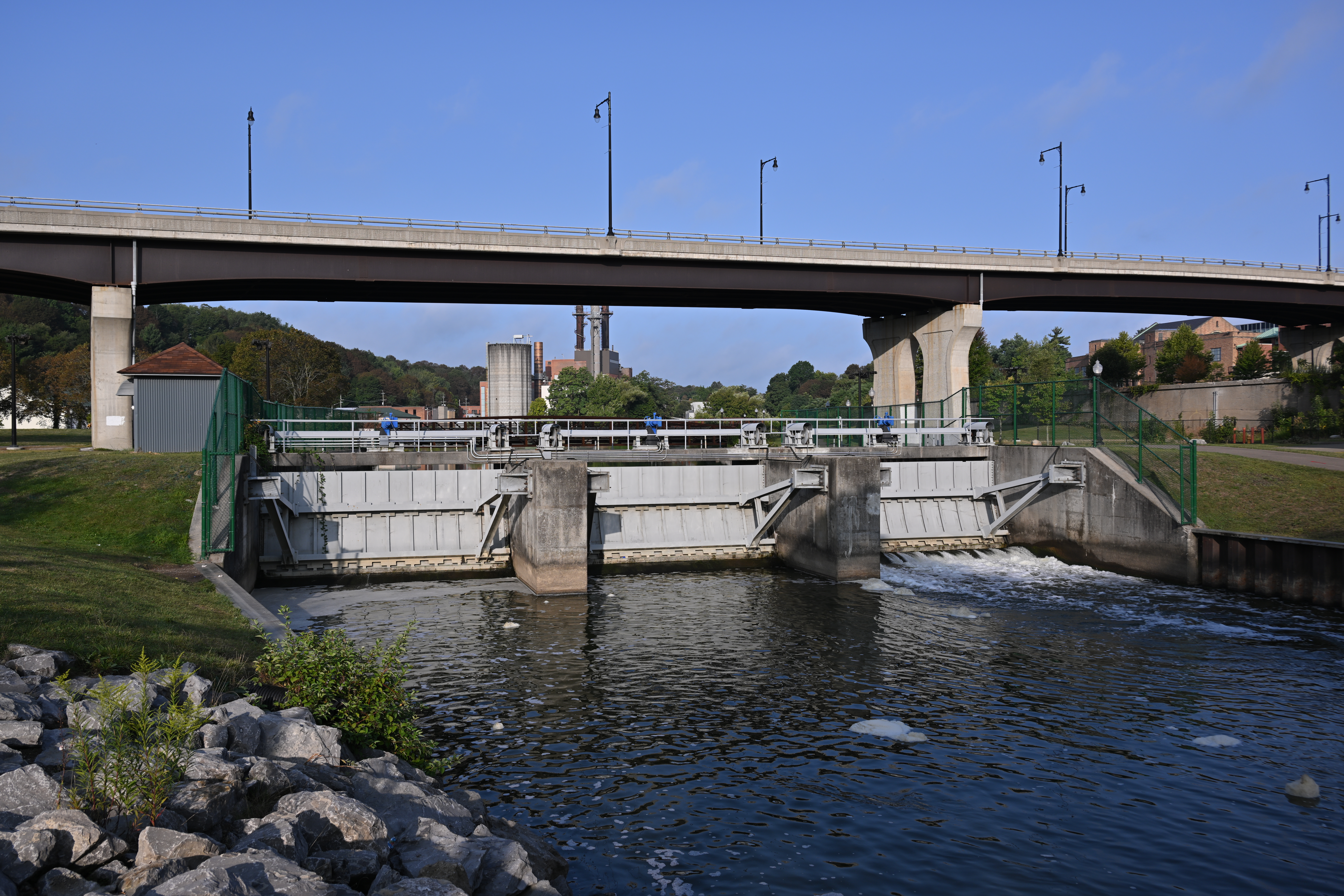
Warner Dam on the Chadakoin River, Jamestown, NY

Warner Dam, at Washington Street in Jamestown, controls the level of Chautauqua Lake and the flow of the Chadakoin. There is a five-foot-high (1.5 m) weir at Buffalo Street in Jamestown. There are several other river modifications. A now abandoned raceway flowed through downtown Jamestown, being diverted west of Main Street, flowing under Main Street and various buildings to power the Broadhead Mills. Also, there are many retaining walls along the river, including along 2nd street. There are railroad tracks from Main Street to Institute Street, buildings on Institute Street, a parking lot for Saint James Church, the former Artone Building, the Former Crescent Tool building, a break wall or former weir near Winsor Street, a building on Willard Street, the Webber Knapp building, walls at former Dahlstrom building, and a break wall or partial weir at Hopkins Avenue. There are other obstructions in the village of Falconer.

A 2019 study determined that the river is generally navigable.

== Natural history ==
The Chadakoin is inhabited by beaver, which down trees along its shore. The Chadakoin is also a habitat for the Spiny softshell turtle.

== Invasive species ==
The Chadakoin, and its source, Chautauqua Lake, have long been invaded by Curly leaf pondweed and Eurasian milfoil. These water plants reduce the enjoyment of the water courses in summer. In July 2022, European water chestnut was discovered in the river, triggering eradication efforts.

== See also ==
- List of rivers of New York
- List of rivers of Pennsylvania
- List of tributaries of the Allegheny River
