= Carroll, New York =

- Town
- Motto: "Unity for our Community"
- Location within Chautauqua County and New York state

- Location within New York Location within the United States
- Coordinates: 42°2′44″N 79°7′37″W
- Country: United States
- State: New York
- County: Chautauqua

Government
  - Type: Town council
  - Town supervisor: Russell L. Payne (R)
  - Town council: Members' list: • Patty Ekstrom (D); • Kenneth Dahlgren (R); • Thomas Fenton (R); • Thomas Allison(D)

Area
  - Total: 33.34 sq mi (86.36 km^{2})
  - Land: 33.3 sq mi (86.3 km^{2})
  - Water: 0.023 sq mi (.06 km^{2})
- Elevation: 1,453 ft (443 m)

Population (2020)
  - Total: 3,456
  - Density: 101.7/sq mi (39.26/km^{2})
- Time zone: UTC-5 (Eastern (EST))
  - Summer (DST): UTC-4 (EDT)
- ZIP Codes: 14738 (Frewsburg); 14701 (Jamestown)
- FIPS code: 36-013-12639
- GNIS feature ID: 0978796
- Website: www.townofcarrollny.gov

Carroll is a town in Chautauqua County, New York, United States. The population was 3,456 at the 2020 census. The town is named after Charles Carroll, a signer of the Declaration of Independence.

The town of Carroll is in the southeast corner of Chautauqua County and is southeast of the city of Jamestown.

== History ==
The area was settled around 1809. The town of Carroll was established in 1825 from part of the town of Ellicott. James Hall was elected its first Supervisor. In 1853, part of Carroll was used to form the town of Kiantone. In 1900, the town had a population of 1,684.

== Geography ==
According to the United States Census Bureau, the town has a total area of 33.4 square miles (86.4 km^{2}), of which 0.023 square miles (0.06 km^{2}), or 0.07%, is water. The town is drained by Conewango Creek, a tributary of the Allegheny River.

The south town line of Carroll is the state boundary of Pennsylvania.

U.S. Route 62 passes through the northwestern part of the town.

=== Adjacent towns and other areas ===
The town of Poland is to the north. The towns of Kiantone and Ellicott are to the west. The town of South Valley in Cattaraugus County is on the east. Pine Grove Township, Warren County, Pennsylvania, is across the south town line.

== Demographics ==
Historical population
Census	Pop.	Note	%±
1830	1,015		—
1840	1,649		62.5%
1850	1,833		11.2%
1860	1,525		−16.8%
1870	1,548		1.5%
1880	1,718		11.0%
1890	1,787		4.0%
1900	1,684		−5.8%
1910	1,564		−7.1%
1920	1,761		12.6%
1930	1,972		12.0%
1940	2,086		5.8%
1950	2,286		9.6%
1960	2,661		16.4%
1970	3,115		17.1%
1980	3,579		14.9%
1990	3,539		−1.1%
2000	3,635		2.7%
2010	3,524		−3.1%
2016 (est.)	3,388		−3.9%
U.S. Decennial Census

As of the census of 2000, there were 3,635 people, 1,364 households, and 1,002 families residing in the town. The population density was 108.9 inhabitants per square mile (42.0/km^{2}). There were 1,440 housing units at an average density of 43.2 per square mile (16.7/km^{2}). The racial makeup of the town was 99.04% White, 0.14% African American, 0.22% Native American, 0.14% Asian, 0.17% from other races, and 0.30% from two or more races. Hispanic or Latino of any race were 0.47% of the population. 25.8% were of Swedish, 24.5% German, 19.1% English, 9.0% English and 15.1% Irish ancestry according to Census 2000.

There were 1,364 households, out of which 34.3% had children under the age of 18 living with them, 60.9% were married couples living together, 8.7% had a female householder with no husband present, and 26.5% were non-families. 22.7% of all households were made up of individuals, and 13.6% had someone living alone who was 65 years of age or older. The average household size was 2.61 and the average family size was 3.05.

In the town, the population was spread out, with 25.9% under the age of 18, 6.4% from 18 to 24, 26.4% from 25 to 44, 23.9% from 45 to 64, and 17.4% who were 65 years of age or older. The median age was 40 years. For every 100 females, there were 94.3 males. For every 100 females age 18 and over, there were 89.9 males.

The median income for a household in the town was $38,313, and the median income for a family was $43,750. Males had a median income of $34,766 versus $21,620 for females. The per capita income for the town was $16,828. About 2.7% of families and 3.4% of the population were below the poverty line, including 1.6% of those under age 18 and 7.0% of those age 65 or over.

== Government ==
The town of Carroll has a council-manager form of government.

=== Executive ===
This section lists the town supervisors for Carroll, New York.

#	Supervisor name	Took office	Left office	Political party
1	Laura Smith-Greenwood	unknown	January 2020	Republican
2	Russell Payne	January 2020	Current	Republican

=== Legislative ===
The legislative body of Carroll consists of four council members, who are elected every four years. Each council member is elected to represent the entire city. This table outlines the current members of the Carroll town council.

Name/party	Took office	Notes
Thomas Fenton (R)	Unknown	none
Kenneth Dahlgren (R)	Unknown	Serving as deputy town supervisor as of 2020
Patty Ekstrom (D)	Unknown	None
Tom Allison (D)	January 1, 2014	none

== Communities and locations in Carroll ==
- Conewango Creek – A stream forming part of the western town boundary that flows past Frewsburg.
- Dodge – A hamlet in the southeast corner of the town, named after an early family. The community is slightly north of the Pennsylvania border.
- Fentonville – A hamlet on County Road 53 (Warren Road) in the southwest corner of the town.
- Frewsburg – The hamlet and census-designated place of Frewsburg is near the west town line and is the largest community in the town.
- Ivory – A hamlet east of Frewsburg on County Road 36 (Ivory Road).

== Notable people ==
Robert H. Jackson

Shane Conlan – in 2019 Conlan was voted Western New York high school player of the year during his senior year playing for Frewsburg Central School. After graduating, Conlan went on to play for Penn State where he won two championships in 1982 and 1986. Conlan was selected as the no. 1 draft pick of the Buffalo Bills in the 1987 NFL Draft. Conlan played with the Bills (1987–92), where he played in the first 3 of the Bills Super Bowl teams and the Los Angeles/St. Louis Rams (1993–95) before retiring from the NFL in 1995.

Reuben Fenton - former supervisor for the town of carroll, Fenton would later serve in the US Congress from March 4, 1853, to March 3, 1855. Fenton also served as New York State governor from 1865 to 1868 before sitting in the US Senate from 1869 to 1875.
