= Elmhurst, New York =

Elmhurst, New York may refer to:

- Elmhurst, Chautauqua County, New York
- Elmhurst, Queens, New York City
