= Ellicott, New York =

- Town
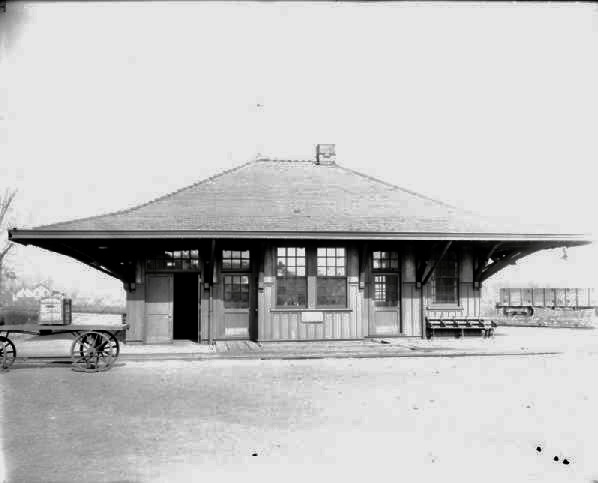
- The former Erie Railroad station in Falconer, a village within Ellicott

- Location within Chautauqua County and New York state

- Location within New York Location within the United States
- Coordinates: 42°7′10″N 79°14′34″W
- Country: United States
- State: New York
- County: Chautauqua

Government
  - Type: Town Council
  - Town Supervisor: Janet Bowman (R)
  - Town Council: Members' List: • W1: Patrick Tyler (D); • W2: Robert White (R); • W3: Katy Whitmore (R); • W4: Kenneth Swan (R)

Area
  - Total: 30.48 sq mi (78.93 km^{2})
  - Land: 30.45 sq mi (78.86 km^{2})
  - Water: 0.023 sq mi (0.06 km^{2})
- Elevation: 1,404 ft (428 m)

Population (2020)
  - Total: 8,771
  - Estimate (2021): 8,708
  - Density: 277.4/sq mi (107.11/km^{2})
- Time zone: UTC-5 (Eastern (EST))
  - Summer (DST): UTC-4 (EDT)
- ZIP Codes: 14720 (Celoron); 14733 (Falconer); 14701 (Jamestown)
- FIPS code: 36-013-23998
- GNIS feature ID: 0978933
- Website: www.townofellicott.gov

Ellicott is a town in Chautauqua County, New York, United States. The population was 8,771 at the 2020 census. The town is named after Joseph Ellicott, an agent of the Holland Land Company.

The town of Ellicott is centrally located in the county, lying on the eastern edge of Chautauqua Lake and surrounding the city of Jamestown on the east, north and west.

== History ==
The first settlers arrived circa 1806. The town of Ellicott was established in 1812 from the town of Pomfret and was one of the first three towns in the county. As such, part of Ellicott was used to form the towns of Busti (1823), Carroll (1825), and Poland (1825), although some territory was later re-annexed to Ellicott from Busti and Carroll.

The city of Jamestown was formed from part of Ellicott in 1886.

== Geography ==
According to the United States Census Bureau, the town has a total area of 30.5 square miles (78.9 km^{2}), of which 0.02 square miles (0.06 km^{2}), or 0.08%, is water.

The town borders the east end of Chautauqua Lake.

The Southern Tier Expressway (Interstate 86 and New York State Route 17) passes through the town north of Jamestown, with access from exits 11, 12, and 13. New York State Route 60 is a major north-south highway in the town, and New York State Route 394 is an east-west route that parallels the Southern Tier Expressway in the southeast part of the town. New York State Route 430 enters Jamestown from the southwest part of Ellicott.

=== Adjacent towns and areas ===
(Clockwise)

- Gerry
- Poland; Carroll
- Kiantone; Busti
- Busti; Ellery

== Demographics ==
Historical population
Census	Pop.	Note	%±
1820	1,462		—
1830	2,101		43.7%
1840	2,571		22.4%
1850	3,523		37.0%
1860	5,112		45.1%
1870	6,679		30.7%
1880	10,842		62.3%
1890	1,746		−83.9%
1900	3,118		78.6%
1910	4,371		40.2%
1920	5,463		25.0%
1930	8,237		50.8%
1940	8,041		−2.4%
1950	9,265		15.2%
1960	10,451		12.8%
1970	10,233		−2.1%
1980	9,979		−2.5%
1990	9,455		−5.3%
2000	9,280		−1.9%
2010	8,714		−6.1%
2020	8,771		0.7%
2021 (est.)	8,708		−0.7%
U.S. Decennial Census

As of the census of 2000, there were 9,280 people, 3,818 households, and 2,596 families residing in the town. The population density was 304.4 inhabitants per square mile (117.5/km^{2}). There were 4,104 housing units at an average density of 134.6 per square mile (52.0/km^{2}). The racial makeup of the town was 97.69% White, 0.53% African American, 0.26% Native American, 0.57% Asian, 0.26% from other races, and 0.69% from two or more races. Hispanic or Latino of any race were 1.05% of the population.

There were 3,818 households, out of which 29.1% had children under the age of 18 living with them, 55.3% were married couples living together, 9.0% had a female householder with no husband present, and 32.0% were non-families. 27.4% of all households were made up of individuals, and 14.1% had someone living alone who was 65 years of age or older. The average household size was 2.38 and the average family size was 2.88.

In the town, the population was spread out, with 23.2% under the age of 18, 6.0% from 18 to 24, 25.2% from 25 to 44, 25.6% from 45 to 64, and 20.0% who were 65 years of age or older. The median age was 42 years. For every 100 females, there were 92.1 males. For every 100 females age 18 and over, there were 87.5 males.

The median income for a household in the town was $39,333, and the median income for a family was $47,813. Males had a median income of $39,144 versus $22,481 for females. The per capita income for the town was $19,296. About 5.8% of families and 8.8% of the population were below the poverty line, including 14.1% of those under age 18 and 5.6% of those age 65 or over.

== Communities and locations in Ellicott ==
- Bonita – A neighborhood in Fluvanna on the north side of Chautauqua Lake and northwest of Jamestown.
- Cassadaga Creek – A stream that flows southward through the town; a tributary of Conewango Creek, part of the Allegheny River watershed.
- Celoron – A village on the south side of Chautauqua Lake and near the western border of the town.
- Chadakoin River – A stream that flows through Jamestown into Cassadaga Creek and is the outlet of Chautauqua Lake.
- Chautauqua County Airport/Jamestown (JHW) – The county airport with scheduled flights and general aviation services is northwest of the city.
- Elmhurst – A neighborhood in Fluvanna on the north side of Chautauqua Lake, northwest of Jamestown.
- Falconer – A village east of Jamestown and on the eastern side of the town.
- Fluvanna – A hamlet on the north side of Chautauqua Lake, northwest of Jamestown, and located on the town line between Ellicott and Ellery on NY Route 430.
- Kimball Stand – A place on the north town line on NY Route 60.
- Levant – A hamlet on the east town line north of Falconer and on NY Route 394 and County Road 65.
- Longview – A place on the south side of Chautauqua Lake west of Celoron.
- Ross Mills – A hamlet north of Falconer on NY Route 380.
- West Ellicott – A hamlet on the west side of the town that stretches between the city of Jamestown on the west to the town of Busti on the east. This place is counted as "Jamestown West" by the U.S. Census Bureau.

== Special mentions ==
Ellicott was featured as the set of an episode of The X-Files, "Alone". Trucks and police cars can be clearly seen stating "Chautauqua Coroner" and "County of Chautauqua Sheriff". The Sheriff cars are true to form and appear to be exact replicas of the true Chautauqua County Sheriff cars.
