= Poland, New York =

Poland is the name of some places in the U.S. state of New York:

- Poland, Chautauqua County, New York, a town
- Poland, Herkimer County, New York, a village
