= Kennedy, New York =

- Census-designated place
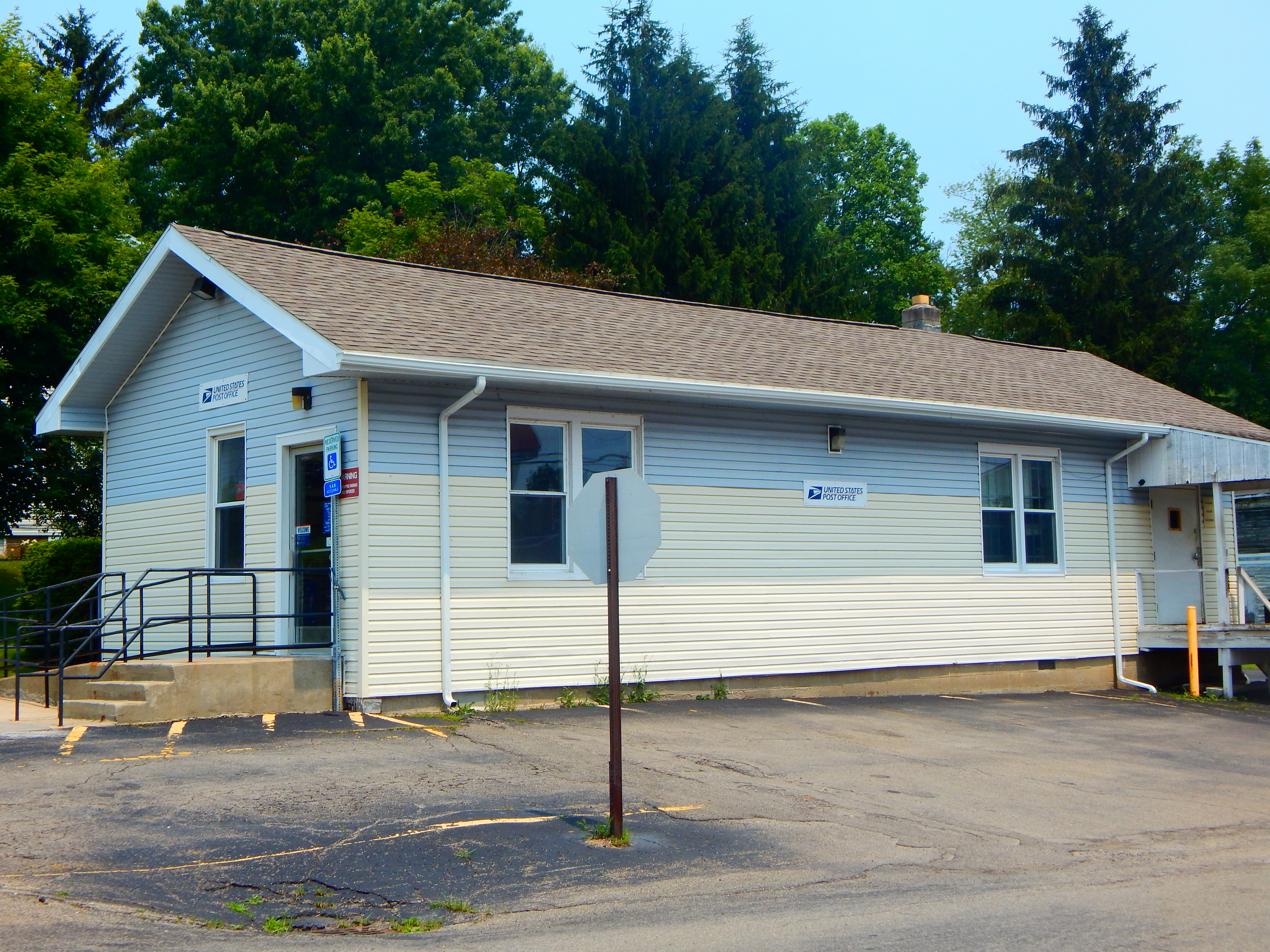
- The Post Office in Kennedy.

- Location within the state of New York
- Coordinates: 42°9′26″N 79°6′7″W
- Country: United States
- State: New York
- County: Chautauqua
- Town: Poland

Area
  - Total: 2.04 sq mi (5.29 km^{2})
  - Land: 2.04 sq mi (5.29 km^{2})
  - Water: 0 sq mi (0.00 km^{2})
- Elevation: 1,270 ft (390 m)

Population (2020)
  - Total: 473
  - Density: 232/sq mi (89.4/km^{2})
- Time zone: UTC-5 (Eastern (EST))
  - Summer (DST): UTC-4 (EDT)
- ZIP code: 14747
- Area code: 716
- FIPS code: 36-39243
- GNIS feature ID: 0954501

Kennedy is a hamlet and census-designated place (CDP) in the town of Poland in Chautauqua County, New York, United States. As of the 2020 census, Kennedy had a population of 473. From 1805–1841, the hamlet was known as Kennedy Mills, in honor of Thomas Ruston Kennedy, the founder of the local mills. The name was changed in 1841 to Kennedyville. Eleven years later, the name changed again, this time to Falconer in honor of Robert and William Falconer (the current Falconer was known as Worksburg until 1874). In 1860, on the request of an Erie Railroad official, the hamlet became Kennedy. The name was promptly placed on the railroad station constructed in 1861.

== Geography ==
Kennedy is located in the northeastern part of the town of Poland in eastern Chautauqua County, in the valley of Conewango Creek, a tributary of the Allegheny River. U.S. Route 62 intersects New York State Route 394 in the center of the hamlet on the north side of Conewango Creek. US 62 leads south 1 mile (1.6 km) to Exit 14 on the Southern Tier Expressway (Interstate 86 and New York State Route 17). From there it is 9 miles (14 km) west to Jamestown, the largest city in the region, and 24 miles (39 km) east to Salamanca.

According to the United States Census Bureau, Kennedy has a total area of 2.0 square miles (5.3 km^{2}), all land.

== Demographics ==
Historical population
Census	Pop.	Note	%±
2020	473		—
U.S. Decennial Census
