= New York State Route 241 =

State highway in Cattaraugus County, New York, US

New York State Route 241
- Map of southwestern New York with NY 241 highlighted in red

Route information
- Maintained by NYSDOT
- Length: 6.96 mi (11.20 km)
- Existed: 1930–present

Major junctions
- South end: NY 394 in Randolph
- North end: US 62 in Conewango

Location
- Country: United States
- State: New York
- Counties: Cattaraugus

Highway system
- New York Highways; Interstate; US; State; Reference; Parkways
← NY 240	→ NY 242

New York State Route 241 (NY 241) is a north–south state highway in Cattaraugus County, New York, in the United States. The southern terminus of the route is at an intersection with NY 394 in the hamlet of Randolph and its northern terminus is at a junction with U.S. Route 62 (US 62) in the town of Conewango. Today, NY 241 is little more than a connector between the two highways; however, when it was first assigned as part of the 1930 renumbering of state highways in New York, it extended north to then-NY 18 in Dayton. The portion of NY 241 north of Conewango was incorporated into an extension of US 62 c. 1932, and NY 241 was truncated in the late 1940s to eliminate the overlap with US 62.

== Route description ==
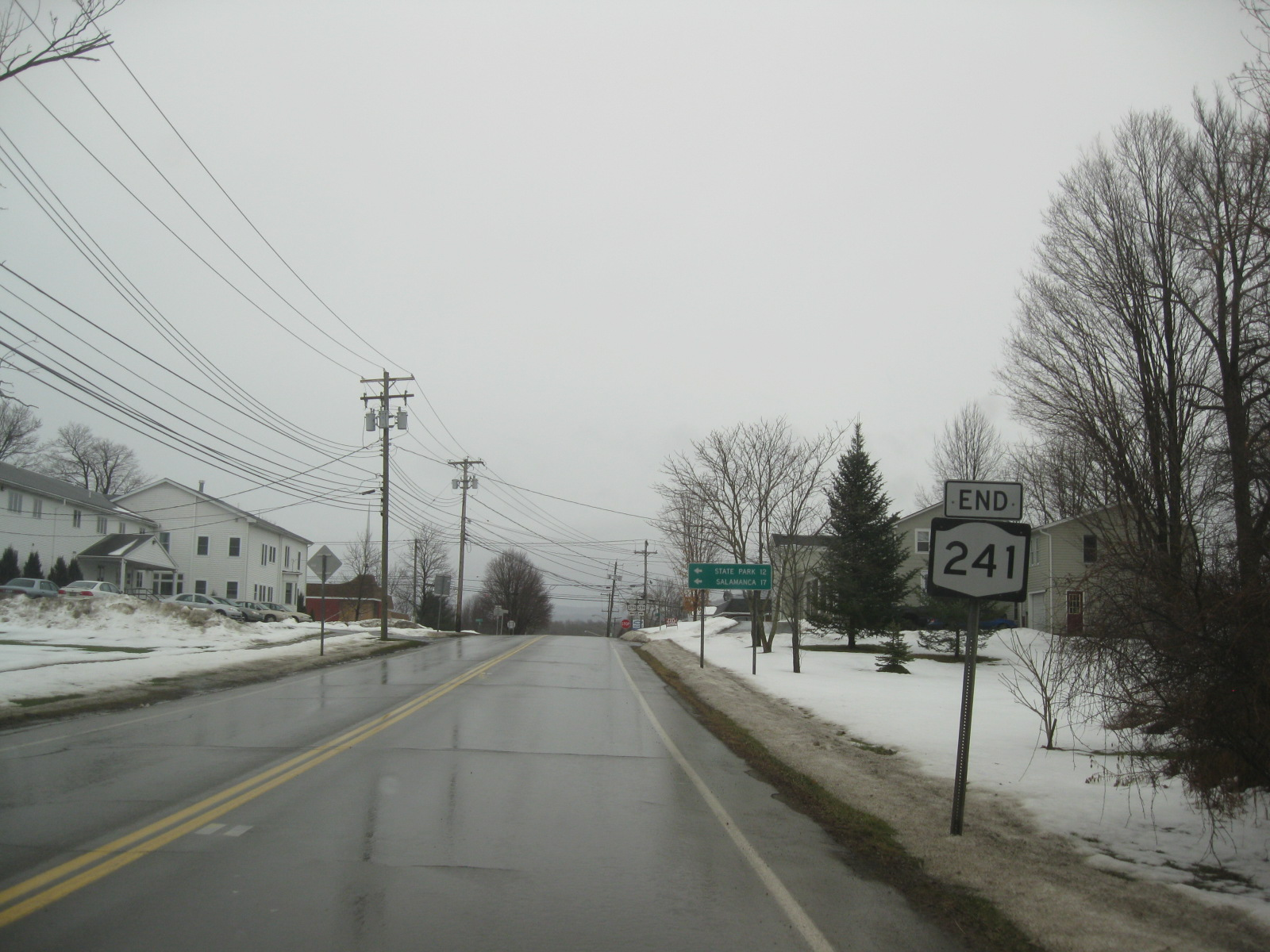
NY 241 southbound at NY 394 in the hamlet of Randolph

NY 241 begins at an intersection with NY 394 (Main Street) and County Route 65 (CR 65, named Weeden Road) in the hamlet of Randolph. The highway heads to the northwest, paralleling NY 394 for a short distance before heading out of Randolph into the rural regions north of the community. The highway heads northward as Conewango Road, passing (and soon paralleling) the Cardinal Hills Golf Course until the intersection with Benson Road. NY 241 continues northward, passing through farmland and soon turning to the northwest once again. The highway passes some residential homes and continues in a west-northwestward progression into the unincorporated community of Pope.

In Pope, the highway begins to fill with forestry before entering a small residential area, leaving Pope a short distance after. NY 241 makes several changes in direction before maintaining a northward progression through farmlands before entering the community of Conewango. There, several more residences begin to populate the northbound highway until CR 40 (Seager Hill Road). At the intersection, CR 40 terminates and NY 241 continues along Seager Hill until the terminus at US 62 in the center of Conewango.

== History ==
NY 241 was assigned as part of the 1930 renumbering of state highways in New York. At the time, it began at NY 17 (modern NY 394) in the village of Randolph and ended at NY 18 (now NY 353) in Dayton. US 62 was extended into New York c. 1932. From Conewango to Dayton, US 62 initially overlapped NY 241. The overlap was eliminated in the late 1940s when NY 241 was truncated southward to its junction with US 62 in Conewango.

== Major intersections ==
The entire route is in Cattaraugus County.

Location	mi	km	Destinations	Notes
Randolph	0.00	0.00	NY 394 (Main Street) – State Park, Salamanca	Southern terminus; hamlet of Randolph
Conewango	6.96	11.20	US 62 – Buffalo, Gowanda, Jamestown	Northern terminus; hamlet of Conewango
1.000 mi = 1.609 km; 1.000 km = 0.621 mi
