= Randolph Historic District =

Historic district in New York, United States

- U.S. National Register of Historic Places
- U.S. Historic district
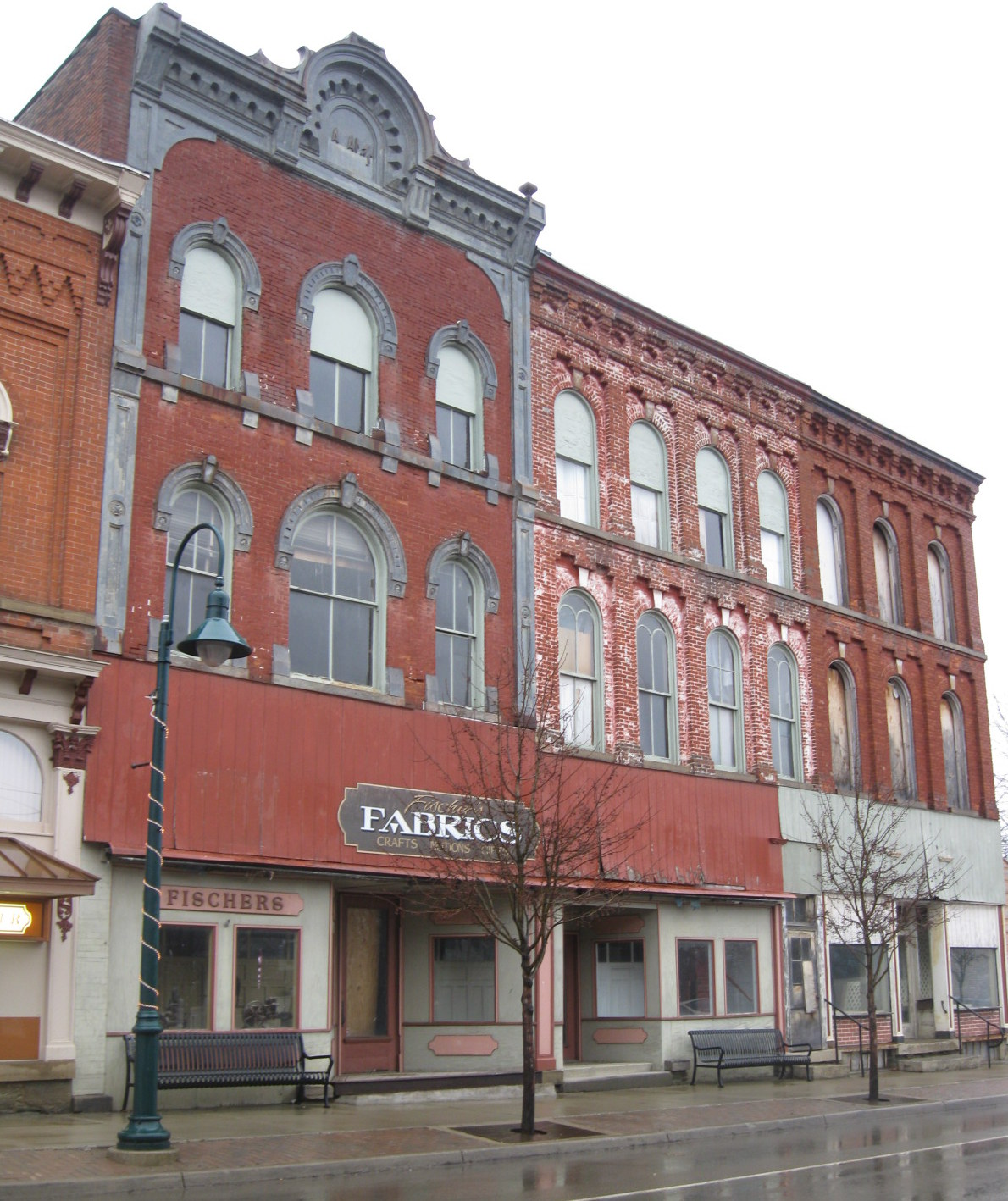
- Commercial Buildings, 112-114 Main St., Randolph Historic District, January 2010. This building collapsed in May 2015.

- Location within New York Location within the United States
- Location: Junction of Main & Jamestown to Borden Sts., Randolph, New York
- Coordinates: 42°09′49″N 78°18′38″W
- Area: 158.58 acres (64.18 ha)
- Built: 1826-c. 1880
- Architectural style: Greek Revival, Italianate
- NRHP reference No.: 12001035
- Added to NRHP: December 12, 2012

Randolph Historic District is a national historic district located at Randolph in Cattaraugus County, New York. The district encompasses 268 contributing buildings, 1 contributing site, and 1 contributing structure in the hamlet of Randolph. The district includes a variety of residential, commercial, industrial, and institutional buildings primarily dating between 1826 and the 1880s. There are representative examples of Greek Revival and Italianate architectural styles. Notable buildings include the Borden's Condensery (1907), Borden's Caretaker's House (1907), Town Hall (c. 1840), Dow Library (c. 1830), Addison Crowley Residence (c. 1830), The Adams Building (1874), State Bank (1874), Alexander Davis House (1851), Thaddeus S. Sheldon Residence (1851), Albert G. Dow House (1865), Resolved Sears House (1850), and St. Patrick's Roman Catholic Church (1876). The contributing site is The Point (c. 1870), a public park.

It was listed on the National Register of Historic Places in 2012.

== Gallery ==
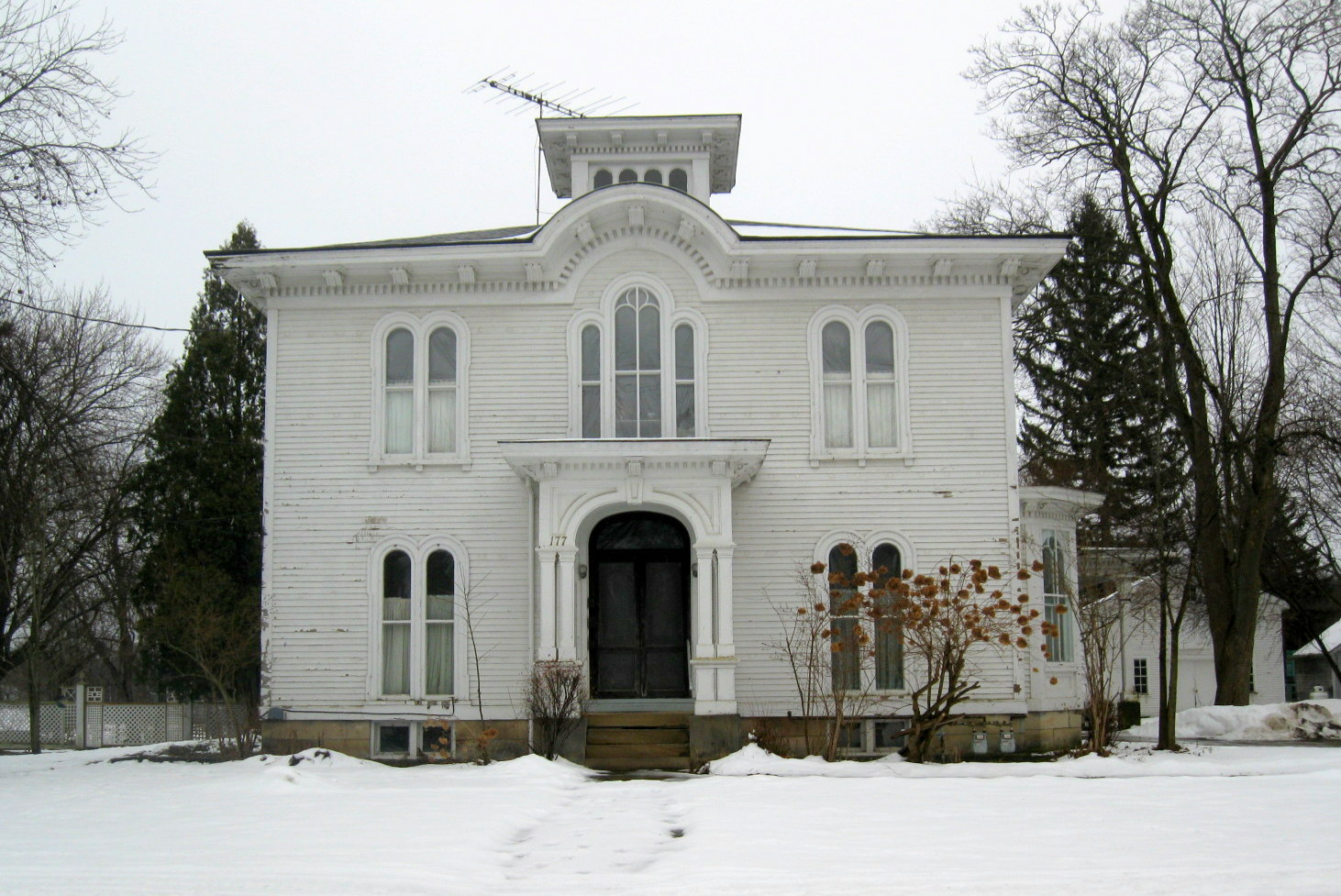
A.G. Dow House, Randolph Historic District, January 2010

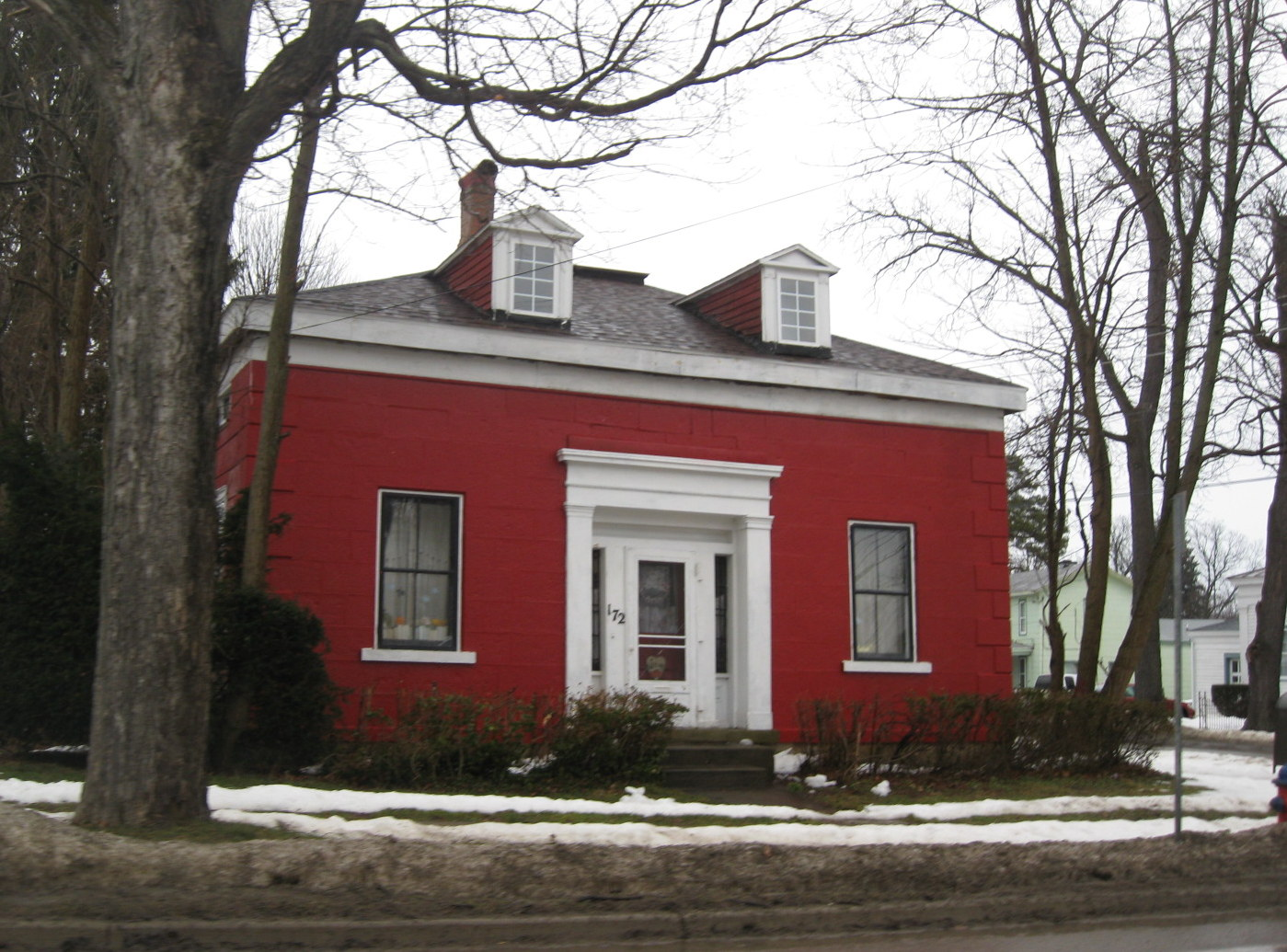
172 Main St., Randolph Historic District, January 2010

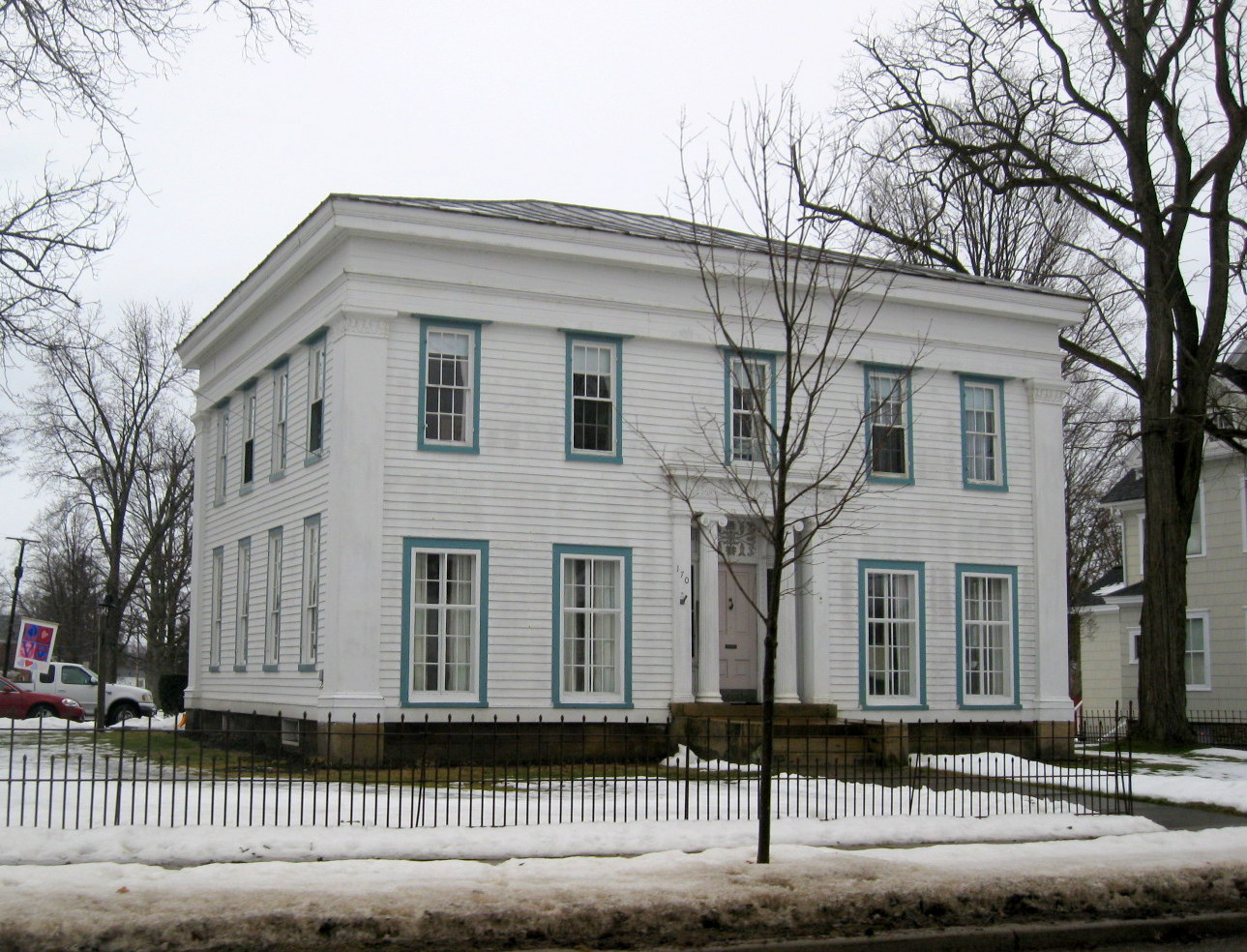
Resolved Sears House, Randolph Historic District, January 2010

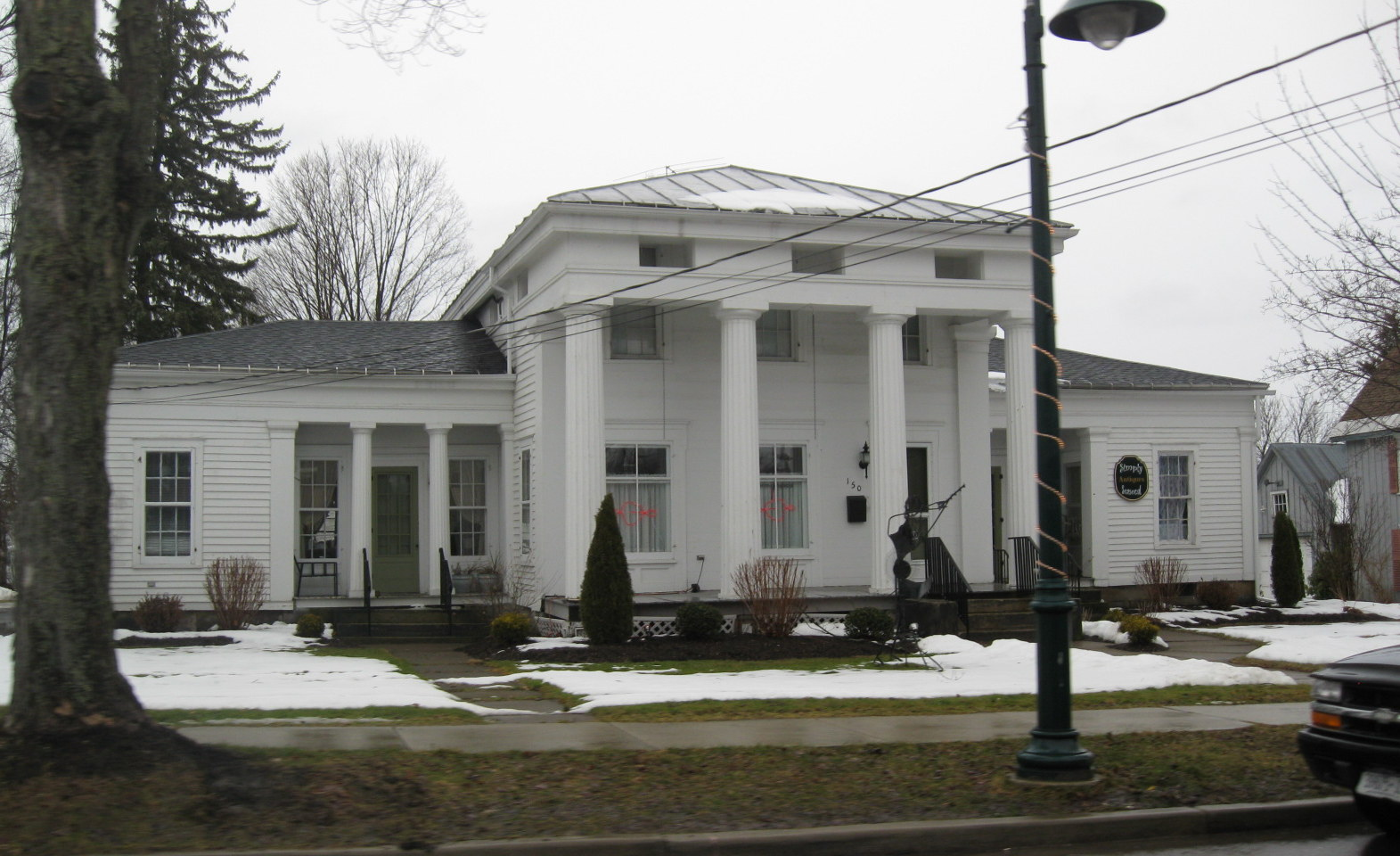
Alexander Davis House, Randolph Historic District, January 2010

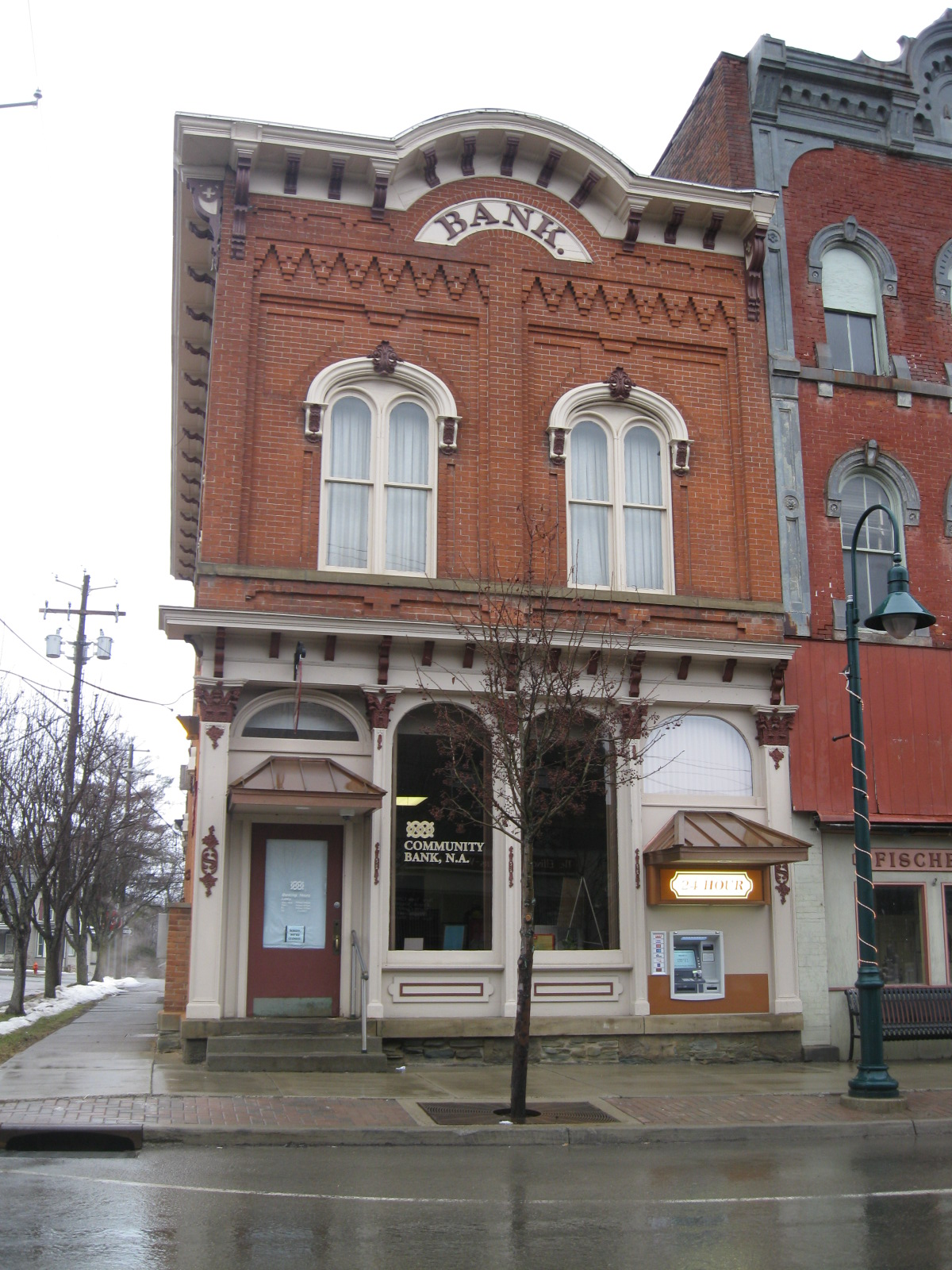
State Bank Building, Randolph Historic District, January 2010
