= Poland, Chautauqua County, New York =

Poland, New York
- Town
- Location within Chautauqua County and New York state

- Location within New York Location within the United States
- Coordinates: 42°07′57″N 79°07′56″W
- Country: United States
- State: New York
- County: Chautauqua
- Settled: 1804
- Created: 1832

Government
  - Type: Town Council
  - Town Supervisor: Kelly Snow (R)
  - Town Council: Members' List: • Norman Gustafson (R); • Steve Hatfield (R); • Corey Swanson (D); • Terry Walker (D)

Area
  - Total: 36.9 sq mi (95.5 km^{2})
  - Land: 36.6 sq mi (94.8 km^{2})
  - Water: 0.27 sq mi (0.7 km^{2})
- Elevation: 1,275 ft (389 m)

Population (2020)
  - Total: 2,201
  - Estimate (2021): 2,183
  - Density: 64/sq mi (24.8/km^{2})
- ZIP Codes: 14747 (Kennedy); 14733 (Falconer); 14701 (Jamestown); 14738 (Frewsburg)
- FIPS code: 36-013-58926
- Website: www.townofpolandny.gov

Poland is an incorporated town in Chautauqua County, New York. The population was 2,201 at the time of the 2020 census. The town is on the county's eastern border.

== History ==
The area that would become the town was first settled in 1804. The town of Poland was formed in 1832 from part of the town of Ellicott.

The early economy was based on forestry, but after the trees were cut down, agriculture dominated.

== Geography ==
According to the United States Census Bureau, the town has a total area of 36.9 square miles (95.5 km^{2}), of which 36.6 square miles (94.8 km^{2}) is land and 0.27 square miles (0.7 km^{2}), or 0.72%, is water.

The Southern Tier Expressway (Interstate 86 and New York State Route 17) passes across the northern part of the town. U.S. Route 62 and New York State Route 394 pass through the town.

=== Adjacent towns and areas ===
(Clockwise)

- Ellington
- Randolph
- Carroll
- Ellicott

== Demographics ==
Historical population
Census	Pop.	Note	%±
1840	1,087		—
1850	1,174		8.0%
1860	1,794		52.8%
1870	1,418		−21.0%
1880	1,539		8.5%
1890	1,608		4.5%
1900	1,613		0.3%
1910	1,447		−10.3%
1920	1,398		−3.4%
1930	1,598		14.3%
1940	1,625		1.7%
1950	1,949		19.9%
1960	2,036		4.5%
1970	2,318		13.9%
1980	2,639		13.8%
1990	2,604		−1.3%
2000	2,467		−5.3%
2010	2,356		−4.5%
2020	2,201		−6.6%
2021 (est.)	2,183		−0.8%
U.S. Decennial Census

As of the census of 2000, there were 2,467 people, 940 households, and 708 families residing in the town. The population density was 67.1 inhabitants per square mile (25.9/km^{2}). There were 990 housing units at an average density of 26.9 per square mile (10.4/km^{2}). The racial makeup of the town was 98.14% White, 0.69% African American, 0.32% Native American, 0.04% Asian, 0.24% from other races, and 0.57% from two or more races. Hispanic or Latino of any race were 1.18% of the population.

There were 940 households, out of which 33.2% had children under the age of 18 living with them, 63.2% were married couples living together, 8.7% had a female householder with no husband present, and 24.6% were non-families. 20.2% of all households were made up of individuals, and 8.8% had someone living alone who was 65 years of age or older. The average household size was 2.62 and the average family size was 3.00.

In the town, the population was spread out, with 25.9% under the age of 18, 6.5% from 18 to 24, 28.3% from 25 to 44, 24.8% from 45 to 64, and 14.4% who were 65 years of age or older. The median age was 39 years. For every 100 females, there were 102.5 males. For every 100 females age 18 and over, there were 98.9 males.

The median income for a household in the town was $37,195, and the median income for a family was $41,728. Males had a median income of $31,862 versus $22,036 for females. The per capita income for the town was $17,115. About 6.6% of families and 10.9% of the population were below the poverty line, including 15.3% of those under age 18 and 3.7% of those age 65 or over.

== Notable people ==
- Alfred W. Benson, former U.S. senator
- Cara Duff-MacCormick, retired Canadian actress
- Harry Eccles, former Major League Baseball pitcher

== Communities and locations in Poland ==
- Clark – A hamlet on Route 62 near the center of the town.
- Clarks Corners – A location at Route 62 and Ericsson Road, east of Clark.
- Conewango Creek – A stream flowing through the town.
- Hartson Swamp Wildlife Management Area – A conservation area south of Poland Center.
- Kennedy – A hamlet and census-designated place at the western junction of Route 62 and NY Route 394 near the north town line. It is the primary settlement in the town; the town's post office (ZIP code 14747) and telephone exchange (716-267) are designated to Kennedy. This hamlet is located approximately 1 mile from I-86.
- Poland Center – A hamlet by the junction of Route 394 and County Road 42.
- Schermerhorn Corners – A location at the junction of Routes 62 and 394 in the northeast part of the town, just to the east of Kennedy.
- Waterboro – A hamlet at County Road 67 and NY Route 394 in the northeast part of the town.
