= Falconer, New York =

- Village
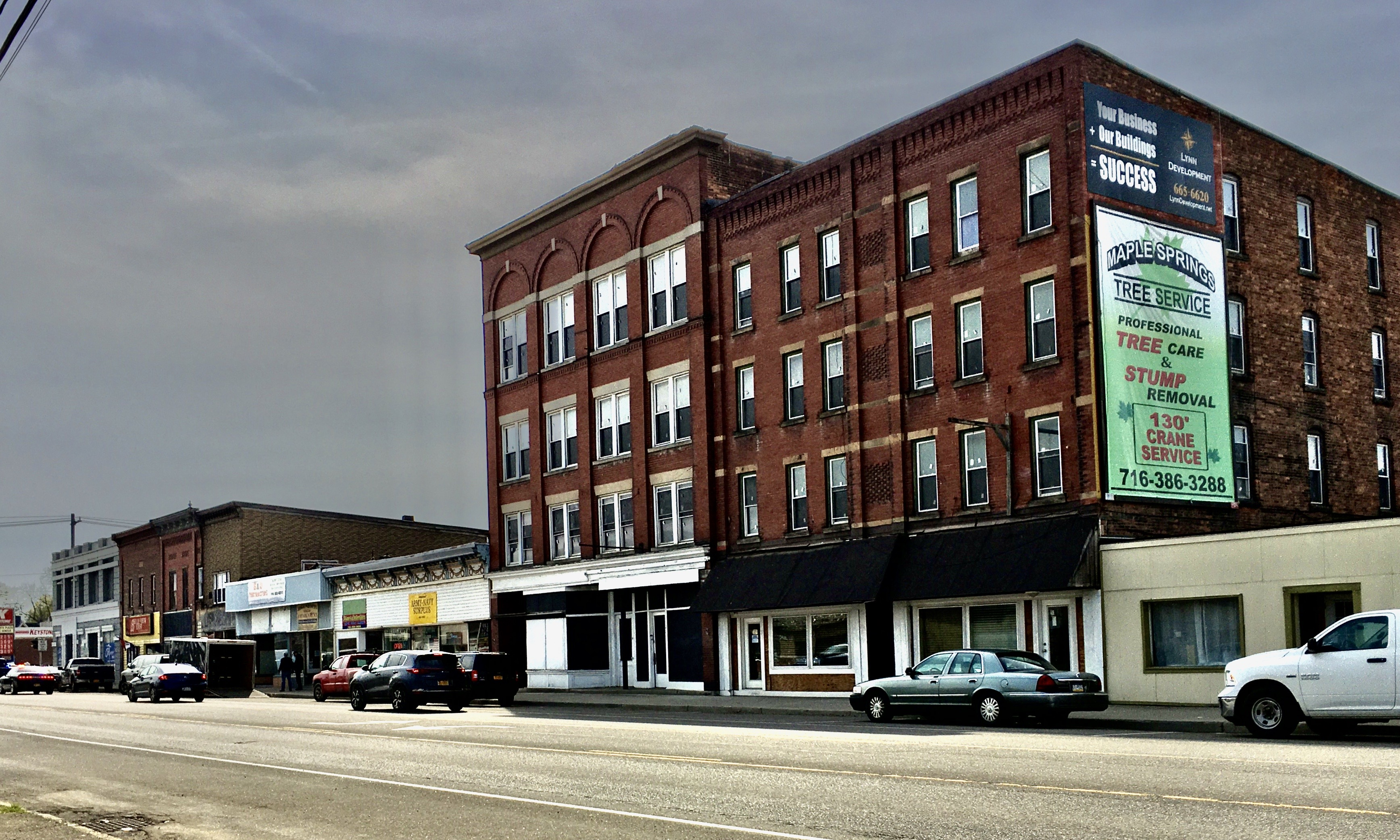
- East Main Street as seen in April 2021

- Location within the state of New York
- Coordinates: 42°7′8″N 79°12′1″W
- Country: United States
- State: New York
- County: Chautauqua
- Town: Ellicott

Area
  - Total: 1.08 sq mi (2.79 km^{2})
  - Land: 1.08 sq mi (2.79 km^{2})
  - Water: 0 sq mi (0.00 km^{2})
- Elevation: 1,263 ft (385 m)

Population (2020)
  - Total: 2,269
  - Density: 2,103.0/sq mi (811.97/km^{2})
- Time zone: UTC-5 (Eastern (EST))
  - Summer (DST): UTC-4 (EDT)
- ZIP code: 14733
- Area code: 716
- FIPS code: 36-25164
- GNIS feature ID: 0949863
- Website: www.falconerny.gov

Falconer is a village in Chautauqua County, New York, United States. The population was 2,284 at the 2020 census. Falconer is within the town of Ellicott and is on the eastern edge of the city of Jamestown.

== History ==
The area now known as Falconer was inhabited by the Erie People until the mid-1600s. Five years of war with the Seneca Nation led to the Erie Nation's decimation; their people migrated and were absorbed into the Seneca community, who then inhabited this land. During the Revolutionary War, the thriving Seneca Nation sided with the losing British. In 1779, George Washington organized the Sullivan Expedition, a military campaign intended to weaken Loyalist and Haudenosaunee (Iroquois) communities. The Seneca signed the Treaty at Big Tree in 1797, surrendering most of their lands to the United States government.

By White settlers, Falconer was originally called Worksburg, after Edward Work, who purchased the land from the Holland Land Company in August 1807. The first Falconer to own the land was Robert Falconer, who bought it from Edward Work in 1836. His son, Patrick, later consolidated his land holdings in the future village. In 1874 the community received its present name, after either William T. Falconer (1850–1915) or his father Patrick, who was on the board of directors of the Allegheny & Pittsburg Railroad and donated a large tract of land through town to the railroad concern. This resulted in the railroad line being routed through the middle of the community. Route 380 in the village retains the name "Work Street" after the town's founder (it also now serves as a double entendre as the village's various industrial sites are on the same road and thus many people "work" there).

The village of Falconer was incorporated in 1891.

John Cheever selected the village as the location for the fictional Falconer State Prison in his novel Falconer.

== Geography ==
Falconer is located in the eastern part of the town of Ellicott at 42°7′8″N 79°12′1″W (42.118908, -79.200207). It is bordered to the west by the city of Jamestown, while its eastern tip touches the border of the town of Poland.

The Chadakoin River, the outlet of Chautauqua Lake, flows from Jamestown and passes through the village, meeting Cassadaga Creek to the northeast at Levant. The river system is part of the Mississippi River basin via Conewango Creek and the Allegheny River.

According to the United States Census Bureau, the village has a total area of 2.8 square kilometres (1.1 sq mi), all land.

New York State Route 394 (east-to-west) and Chautauqua County Route 380 (north-to-south) are the primary routes through Falconer. Access to and from Interstate 86 is available via exit 13, just east of the village. County Route 65 enters the village from the southeast. Falconer is unusual among villages in the area in that its speed limit is 25 miles per hour, the lowest of any village or town in Chautauqua County; Route 394 has a 35 mile-per-hour posted speed limit.

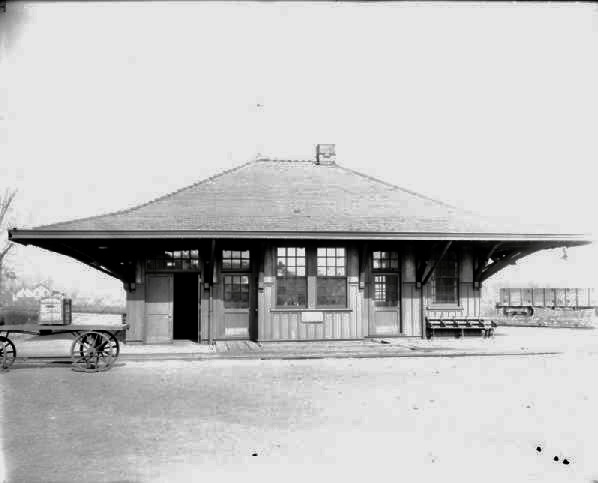
Former Erie Railroad station as seen in 1909

== Demographics ==
Historical population
Census	Pop.	Note	%±
1890	574		—
1900	1,136		97.9%
1910	2,141		88.5%
1920	2,742		28.1%
1930	3,579		30.5%
1940	3,222		−10.0%
1950	3,292		2.2%
1960	3,343		1.5%
1970	2,983		−10.8%
1980	2,778		−6.9%
1990	2,653		−4.5%
2000	2,540		−4.3%
2010	2,420		−4.7%
2020	2,269		−6.2%
2021 (est.)	2,263	▼	−0.3%
U.S. Decennial Census

=== 2020 census ===
As of the 2020 census, Falconer had a population of 2,269. The median age was 40.0 years. 22.7% of residents were under the age of 18 and 18.6% of residents were 65 years of age or older. For every 100 females there were 98.0 males, and for every 100 females age 18 and over there were 92.0 males age 18 and over.

98.9% of residents lived in urban areas, while 1.1% lived in rural areas.

There were 1,003 households in Falconer, of which 28.0% had children under the age of 18 living in them. Of all households, 36.1% were married-couple households, 21.7% were households with a male householder and no spouse or partner present, and 31.9% were households with a female householder and no spouse or partner present. About 34.7% of all households were made up of individuals and 14.6% had someone living alone who was 65 years of age or older.

There were 1,141 housing units, of which 12.1% were vacant. The homeowner vacancy rate was 3.9% and the rental vacancy rate was 10.3%.

Racial composition as of the 2020 census
Race	Number	Percent
White	2,113	93.1%
Black or African American	8	0.4%
American Indian and Alaska Native	4	0.2%
Asian	8	0.4%
Native Hawaiian and Other Pacific Islander	0	0.0%
Some other race	12	0.5%
Two or more races	124	5.5%
Hispanic or Latino (of any race)	63	2.8%

=== 2000 census ===
As of the census of 2000, there were 2,540 people, 1,109 households, and 699 families residing in the village. The population density was 2,346 inhabitants per square mile (906/km^{2}). There were 1,216 housing units at an average density of 2,346.7 per square mile (906.1/km^{2}). The racial makeup of the village was 97.8% White, 0.6% African American, 0.5% Native American, 0.3% Asian, 0.1% from other races, and 0.7% from two or more races. Hispanic or Latino of any race were 1.1% of the population.

There were 1,109 households, out of which 29.4% had children under the age of 18 living with them, 46.5% were married couples living together, 11.7% had a female householder with no husband present, and 37.0% were non-families. 31.5% of all households were made up of individuals, and 15.5% had someone living alone who was 65 years of age or older. The average household size was 2.29 and the average family size was 2.88.

In the village, the population was spread out, with 24.0% under the age of 18, 7.4% from 18 to 24, 27.0% from 25 to 44, 21.6% from 45 to 64, and 20.0% who were 65 years of age or older. The median age was 39.9 years. For every 100 females, there were 92.7 males. For every 100 females age 18 and over, there were 86.1 males.

The median income for a household in the village was $32,222, and the median income for a family was $41,711. Males had a median income of $34,961 versus $21,250 for females. The per capita income for the village was $15,205. About 6.2% of families and 10.1% of the population were below the poverty line, including 13.1% of those under age 18 and 12.9% of those age 65 or over.
