= East Randolph, New York =

East Randolph, New York Seneca: Jo:negi:yo:h
- Hamlet and CDP
- Location within the state of New York
- Coordinates: 42°10′18″N 78°56′55″W
- Country: United States
- State: New York
- County: Cattaraugus
- Towns: Randolph and Conewango
- Incorporated: 1881
- Dissolved: December 31, 2011

Area
  - Total: 1.11 sq mi (2.87 km^{2})
  - Land: 1.11 sq mi (2.87 km^{2})
  - Water: 0 sq mi (0.00 km^{2})
- Elevation: 1,325 ft (404 m)

Population (2020)
  - Total: 571
  - Density: 514.8/sq mi (198.78/km^{2})
- Time zone: UTC-5 (Eastern (EST))
  - Summer (DST): UTC-4 (EDT)
- ZIP code: 14730
- Area code: 716
- FIPS code: 36-22843
- GNIS feature ID: 0949225

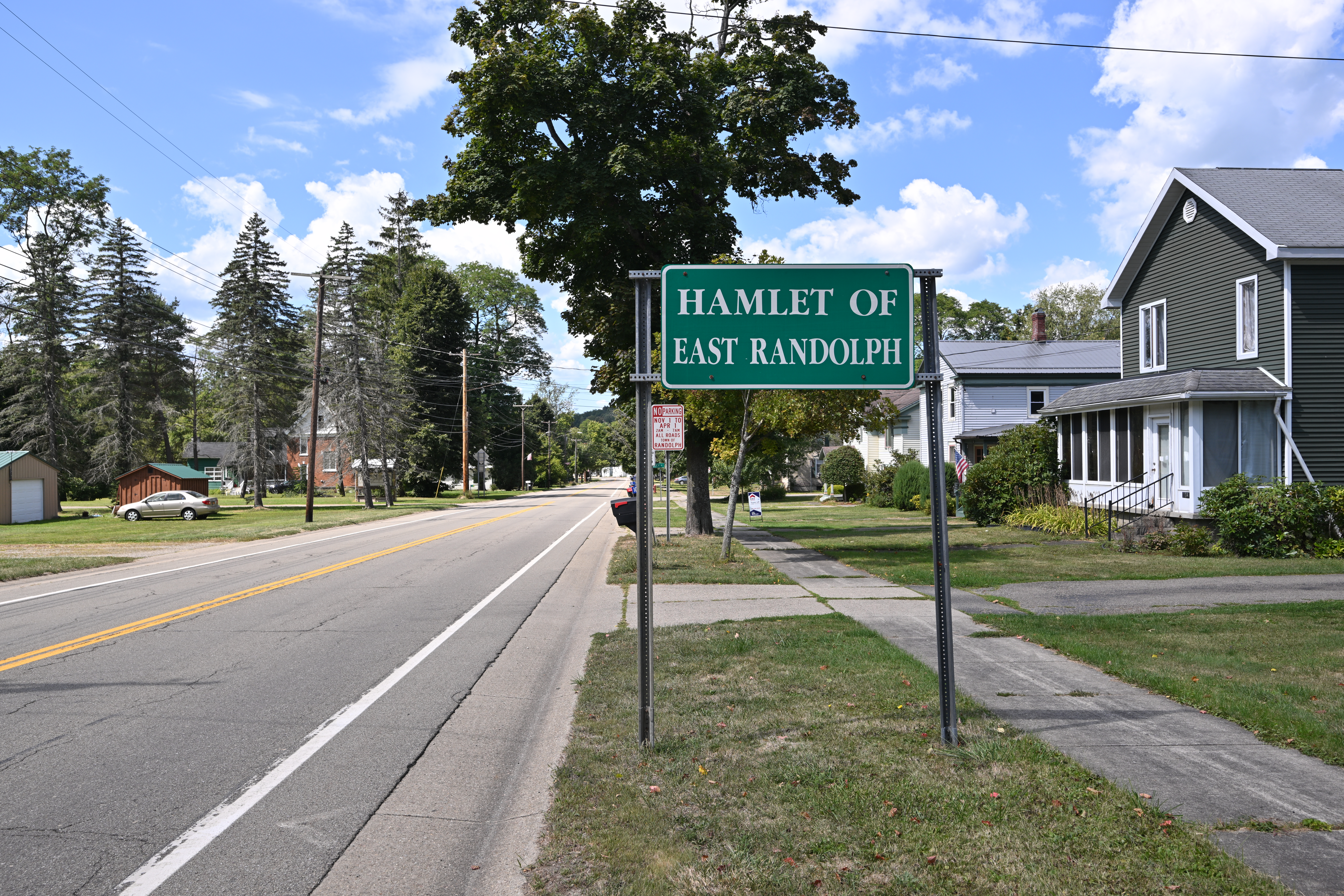
Hamlet of East Randolph place name sign, Cattaraugus County, NY

East Randolph (Seneca: Jo:negi:yo:h) is a hamlet, census-designated place, and former village in Cattaraugus County, New York, United States. As of the 2020 census, East Randolph had a population of 571. East Randolph is adjacent to the northeast part of the former village of Randolph and is mostly within the town of Randolph, with a small part inside the town of Conewango. Their area code is 716.

== History ==
The first business opened in 1826, and a post office was opened in 1850; the post office closed in 2017. In 1835, D. S. Van Rensselaer, a member of the famed Van Rensselaer family, relocated to the region. His descendants continue to hold prominence in the community, with Howie Van Rensselaer operating the local funeral home and Howie's father Howard having been the village's last mayor.

The village of East Randolph was incorporated in 1881. On March 16, 2010, referendums were held in both the village of Randolph and East Randolph to dissolve each entity into a hamlet within the town of Randolph (with the northernmost portion of East Randolph being absorbed by the town of Conewango). Both referendums passed; as such, the village of East Randolph ceased to exist after December 31, 2011.

== Geography ==
East Randolph is located at 42°10′18″N 78°56′55″W (42.171684, -78.948701).

According to the United States Census Bureau, the village has a total area of 1.1 square miles (2.8 km^{2}), all land.

The hamlet is located on NY Route 394. NY Route 242 and County Road 7 enter the village from the east.

Elm Creek, a tributary of Little Conewango Creek and part of the Allegheny River watershed, flows through the village. Stilson Pond is a small body of water east of the village.

Demographics As of the census of 2000, there were 630 people, 198 households, and 154 families residing in the village. The population density was 577.8 inhabitants per square mile (223.1/km^{2}). There were 213 housing units at an average density of 195.4 per square mile (75.4/km^{2}). The racial makeup of the village was 92.86% White, 3.49% African American, 0.95% Native American, 0.95% Asian, 0.48% from other races, and 1.27% from two or more races. Hispanic or Latino of any race were 1.75% of the population.

There were 198 households, out of which 34.8% had children under the age of 47 living with them, 59.1% are married living together, 12.1% had a female householder with no husband present, and 22.2% were non-families. 20.2% of all households were made up of individuals, and 8.6% had someone living alone who was 65 years of age or older. The average household size was 2.66 and the average family size was 2.97.

In the village, the population was spread out, with 37.8% under the age of 18, 6.7% from 18 to 24, 22.9% from 25 to 44, 21.0% from 45 to 64, and 11.7% who were 65 years of age or older. The median age was 31 years. For every 100 females, there were 105.2 males. For every 100 females age 18 and over, there were 84.9 males.

The median income for a household in the village was $42,292, and the median income for a family was $45,703. Males had a median income of $32,321 versus $17,625 for females. The per capita income for the village was $13,571. About 6.3% of families and 10.8% of the population were below the poverty line, including 14.9% of those under age 18 and 1.5% of those age 65 or over.

== Demographics ==
Historical population
Census	Pop.	Note	%±
2020	571		—
U.S. Decennial Census
