= Frewsburg, New York =

- Census-designated place
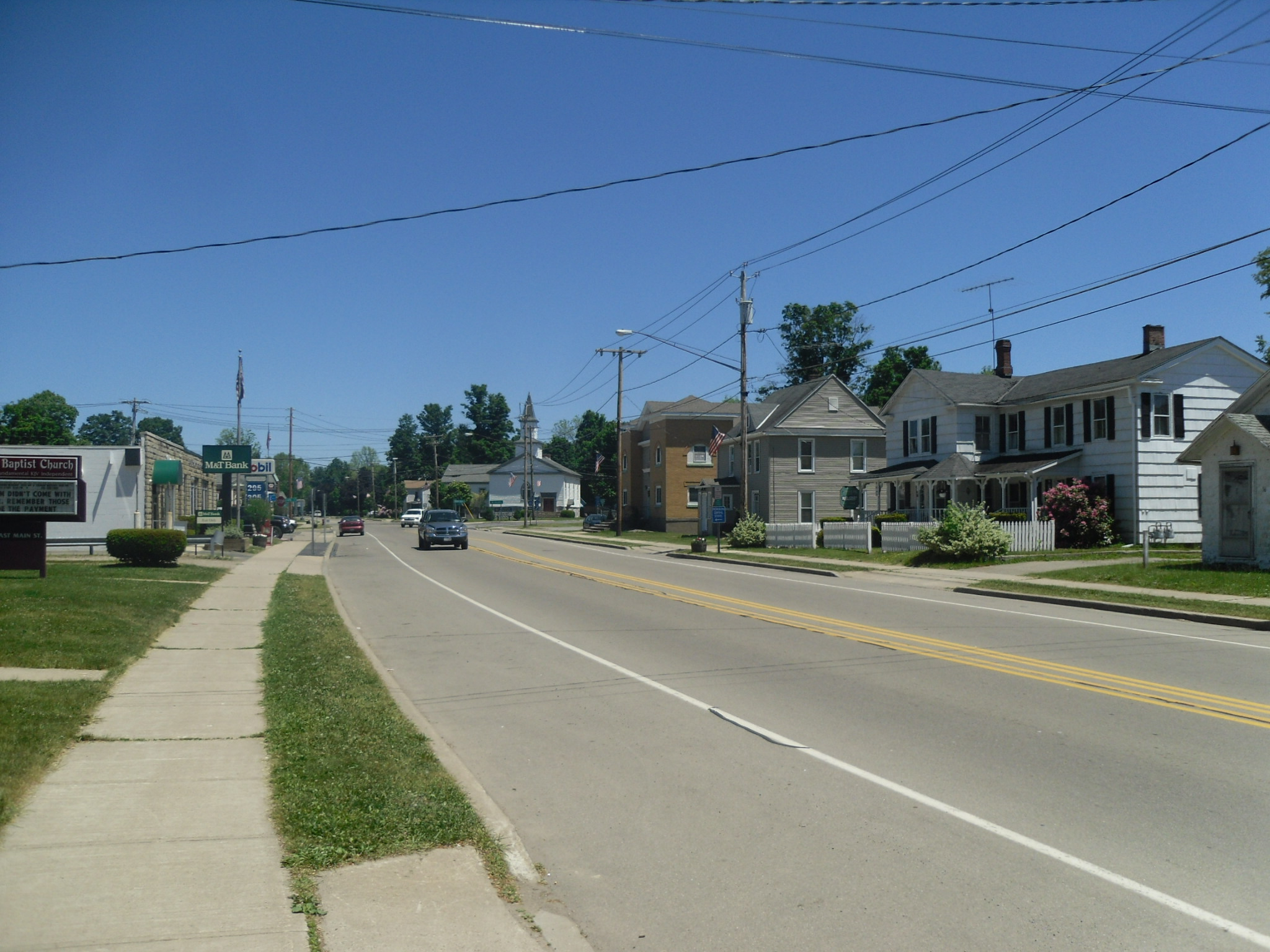

- Location within the state of New York
- Coordinates: 42°3′26″N 79°9′39″W
- Country: United States
- State: New York
- County: Chautauqua
- Town: Carroll

Area
  - Total: 3.36 sq mi (8.69 km^{2})
  - Land: 3.34 sq mi (8.66 km^{2})
  - Water: 0.015 sq mi (0.04 km^{2})
- Elevation: 1,299 ft (396 m)

Population (2020)
  - Total: 1,843
  - Density: 551.5/sq mi (212.93/km^{2})
- Time zone: UTC-5 (Eastern (EST))
  - Summer (DST): UTC-4 (EDT)
- ZIP code: 14738
- Area code: 716
- FIPS code: 36-27672
- GNIS feature ID: 0950723

Frewsburg is a hamlet and census-designated place in the town of Carroll in Chautauqua County, New York, United States. As of the 2020 census, Frewsburg had a population of 1,843. The ZIP code is 14738 and the telephone exchange (which extends past Carroll and well into South Valley and Kennedy) is 569 (in area code 716).

Frewsburg is located on U.S. Route 62, which forms the main street in the village. While not an incorporated village, Frewsburg does have a population that is larger than many villages in the region and is a significant community in the area, dwarfed only by the city of Jamestown 5 miles (8 km) to the northwest.

== Geography ==
According to the United States Census Bureau, the community has a total area of 3.4 square miles (8.8 km^{2}), of which 0.015 square miles (0.04 km^{2}), or 0.43%, is water.

Conewango Creek, a tributary of the Allegheny River, flows past the west side of the village.

U.S. Route 62 passes through Frewsburg as Main Street. County Routes 34, 53 and 55 meet US 62 on the east side of town. New York State Route 60 has its southern terminus a few miles west of Frewsburg; a previous routing of Route 60 extended into Frewsburg, and portions of US 62 still bear Route 60 reference markers.

== History ==
Frewsburg is named after the Frews - Hugh and Mary Frew, who were supposedly the first European family to settle in this area in 1807. The location of their first house is commemorated by a historic marker on Main Street in Frewsburg. The Frew House is privately owned and still used as a residence, having been divided into two units.

The hamlet hosts the Gala Days festival, which is run by the fire department in mid-July. As of 2010, an annual June Rib Festival has been added.

On the Saturday after Thanksgiving, Frewsburg holds an annual "Old Fashioned Santa Parade." The parade features no motorized vehicles, with all participants powered either by horseback or by foot.

== Notable people ==
Reuben Eaton Fenton (1819-1885): Fenton was born in the Town of Ellicott, on land that became part of the Town of Carroll in 1825. Reuben was the youngest of five sons born to George W. Fenton Sr and Elsie Owen. He was educated in Frewsburg, Cary Farmer College in Ohio, and Fredonia Academy. While reading law in the offices of Waite brothers in Jamestown, he taught two terms at Jamestown Academy. He became the youngest Supervisor elected in the Town of Carroll in 1846, and was reelected six times. Fenton was elected New York State Governor in Nov. 1864, and also won a second term. The Fenton family moved from Frewsburg to their newly built home in Jamestown after his election. He was a member of the U.S.Senate from 1869 until 1875, he then became Director, then President of the First National Bank at Jamestown, New York. He died on August 25, 1885, at the age of 66.

Robert H. Jackson (1892–1954): The boyhood home of this future lawyer, New Deal official, U.S. Attorney General, U.S. Supreme Court justice and chief prosecutor at Nuremberg of Nazi war criminals following World War II is located on the main street in Frewsburg. It is marked with a plaque in his honor. Frewsburg's Robert H. Jackson Elementary School is located a few blocks away. Justice Jackson is buried in Frewsburg's Maple Grove cemetery. The Robert H. Jackson Center, devoted to education and events that further his illustrious legacy, is located in nearby Jamestown.

Lloyd Moore, who competed in NASCAR from 1949 to 1955, was born in Frewsburg and worked as a bus driver and mechanic in the school district for many years. When he died March 18, 2008, he was the oldest living former NASCAR driver.

Shane Conlan, retired National Football League player who spent most of his career with the nearby Buffalo Bills, was born in nearby Olean in 1964 and was raised and attended school in Frewsburg. He was coached by Frewsburg High School coach Tom Sharp. Conlan attended college at Penn State University where he was a two-time All-American at linebacker and was coached by Joe Paterno.

== Demographics ==
Historical population
| Census | Pop. | Note | %± |
|---|---|---|---|
| 2020 | 1,843 | | — |
U.S. Decennial Census

As of the census of 2000, there were 1,965 people, 742 households, and 528 families residing in the area. The population density was 584.3 inhabitants per square mile (225.6/km^{2}). There were 770 housing units at an average density of 229.0 per square mile (88.4/km^{2}). The racial makeup of the CDP was 99.34% White, 0.15% African American, 0.20% Native American, 0.10% Asian, and 0.20% from two or more races. Hispanic or Latino of any race were 0.25% of the population.

There were 742 households, out of which 33.2% had children under the age of 18 living with them, 57.7% were married couples living together, 10.0% had a female householder with no husband present, and 28.8% were non-families. 25.2% of all households were made up of individuals, and 16.4% had someone living alone who was 65 years of age or older. The average household size was 2.54 and the average family size was 3.03.

In the community, the population was spread out, with 24.8% under the age of 18, 6.2% from 18 to 24, 25.3% from 25 to 44, 23.6% from 45 to 64, and 20.2% who were 65 years of age or older. The median age was 41 years. For every 100 females, there were 87.1 males. For every 100 females age 18 and over, there were 80.8 males.

The median income for a household in the hamlet was $32,688, and the median income for a family was $36,050. Males had a median income of $30,625 versus $22,500 for females. The per capita income for the CDP was $15,254. About 10.1% of families and 11.7% of the population were below the poverty line, including 8.0% of those under age 18 and 10.8% of those age 65 or over.
