= Randolph, New York =

- Town
- Location within New York Location within the United States
- Coordinates: 42°7′46″N 78°59′55″W
- Country: United States
- State: New York
- County: Cattaraugus

Government
  - Type: Town Council
  - Town Supervisor: Dale S. Senn (R)
  - Town Council: Members' List: • Daniel B. Andrews (R); • Beverly S. Kehe-Rowland (R); • John T. Milliman (R); • Timothy R. Shields (R)

Area
  - Total: 36.29 sq mi (93.98 km^{2})
  - Land: 36.07 sq mi (93.41 km^{2})
  - Water: 0.22 sq mi (0.58 km^{2})
- Elevation: 1,740 ft (530 m)

Population (2020)
  - Total: 2,470
  - Estimate (2021): 2,452
  - Density: 69.6/sq mi (26.89/km^{2})
- Time zone: Eastern (EST)
- ZIP Codes: 14772 (Randolph); 14730 (East Randolph); 14747 (Kennedy)
- FIPS code: 36-009-60587
- Website: www.randolphny.gov

Randolph is a town in Cattaraugus County, New York, United States. The population was 2,470 at the 2020 census. The town was named after Randolph, Vermont.

The town of Randolph contains a former village called Randolph. The town also contains most of the former village of East Randolph, the rest of which is located in the town of Conewango. Randolph is on the west border of the county, roughly halfway between the cities of Salamanca and Jamestown.

== History ==
The town of Randolph sits on the vast tracts of land which were originally owned by the Holland Land Company. The region was first settled around 1820. The first settler was Edmund Fuller, who arrived from Oneida County in 1820 and built a log cabin.

The town of Randolph was formed in 1826 from part of the town of Conewango. On March 7, 1826, citizens assembled for their first annual meeting to select the town supervisor and other officials. In 1847, the town was divided to form the town of South Valley.

In 1867, the village of Randolph was incorporated. The village of East Randolph was incorporated in 1881. In 2010, the citizens of both villages voted to dissolve the incorporation, and they reverted to being hamlets within the town, with part of East Randolph becoming once again part of the town of Conewango, effective 2011.

== Geography ==
According to the United States Census Bureau, the town has a total area of 36.3 square miles (94.0 km^{2}), of which 36.1 square miles (93.4 km^{2}) is land and 0.23 square miles (0.6 km^{2}), or 0.61%, is water.

Randolph is located on the west border of the county, next to Chautauqua County.

The Southern Tier Expressway (Interstate 86 and New York State Route 17) crosses the town, with access from Exits 15 and 16. New York State Route 241 is a highway in the northeast part of the town, and New York State Route 394 is an east-west highway in the northern part of the town.

Randolph was on the mainline of the Erie Railroad, which later became the Erie Lackawanna Railway and Conrail. The train station was located between Main Street and Washington Street and serviced both passengers and freight.

=== Adjacent towns and areas ===
The west border of the town is next to the town of Poland in Chautauqua County. To the south is the town of South Valley. The town of Conewango is to the north, and the town of Coldspring is to the east.

== Demographics ==
Historical population
Census	Pop.	Note	%±
1830	776		—
1840	1,283		65.3%
1850	1,606		25.2%
1860	1,954		21.7%
1870	2,167		10.9%
1880	2,459		13.5%
1890	2,448		−0.4%
1900	2,605		6.4%
1910	2,486		−4.6%
1920	2,171		−12.7%
1930	2,255		3.9%
1940	2,206		−2.2%
1950	2,535		14.9%
1960	2,513		−0.9%
1970	2,621		4.3%
1980	2,593		−1.1%
1990	2,613		0.8%
2000	2,681		2.6%
2010	2,602		−2.9%
2020	2,470		−5.1%
2021 (est.)	2,452	▼	−0.7%
U.S. Decennial Census

As of the census of 2000, there were 2,681 people, 1,007 households, and 702 families residing in the town. The population density was 74.1 inhabitants per square mile (28.6/km^{2}). There were 1,122 housing units at an average density of 31.0 per square mile (12.0/km^{2}). The racial makeup of the town was 97.24% White, 0.90% Black or African American, 0.48% Native American, 0.26% Asian, 0.04% Pacific Islander, 0.15% from other races, and 0.93% from two or more races. Hispanic or Latino of any race were 0.60% of the population.

There were 1,007 households, out of which 31.8% had children under the age of 18 living with them, 55.6% were married couples living together, 10.5% had a female householder with no husband present, and 30.2% were non-families. 25.7% of all households were made up of individuals, and 12.8% had someone living alone who was 65 years of age or older. The average household size was 2.55 and the average family size was 3.04.

In the town, the population was spread out, with 28.3% under the age of 18, 7.7% from 18 to 24, 25.1% from 25 to 44, 23.9% from 45 to 64, and 15.0% who were 65 years of age or older. The median age was 38 years. For every 100 females, there were 96.0 males. For every 100 females age 18 and over, there were 89.7 males.

The median income for a household in the town was $34,485, and the median income for a family was $39,570. Males had a median income of $30,888 versus $20,586 for females. The per capita income for the town was $15,860. About 4.2% of families and 6.6% of the population were below the poverty line, including 6.8% of those under age 18 and 4.7% of those age 65 or over.

== Communities and locations in the Town of Randolph ==
- Battle Creek – A stream flowing through the center of the town.
- Bowen – A hamlet on County Road 8 in the central part of the town.
- Carr Corners – A hamlet in the southeast corner of the town.
- East Randolph – The hamlet of East Randolph is partly in the town.
- Little Conewango Creek – A stream in the northeast part of the town.
- Randolph – The hamlet of Randolph, the first place settled, is in the northeast corner of the town at a junction of NY Routes 394 and 241.
- Vollentine – A hamlet in the southwest part of the town, south of Bowen.
