= Elmhurst, Chautauqua County, New York =

Neighborhood in Ellicot, New York, U.S.

Coordinates: 42°07′05″N 79°17′37″W

Elmhurst, a neighborhood located south of Fluvanna, is a place in western Ellicott, Chautauqua County, the westernmost county in the U.S. state of New York. It borders Chautauqua Lake to the south. It is located at latitude 42°7'5" North, longitude 79°17'38" West and the elevation is 1309 ft (399 m) above sea level.
