= Randolph (CDP), New York =

Randolph, New York
- Hamlet and CDP
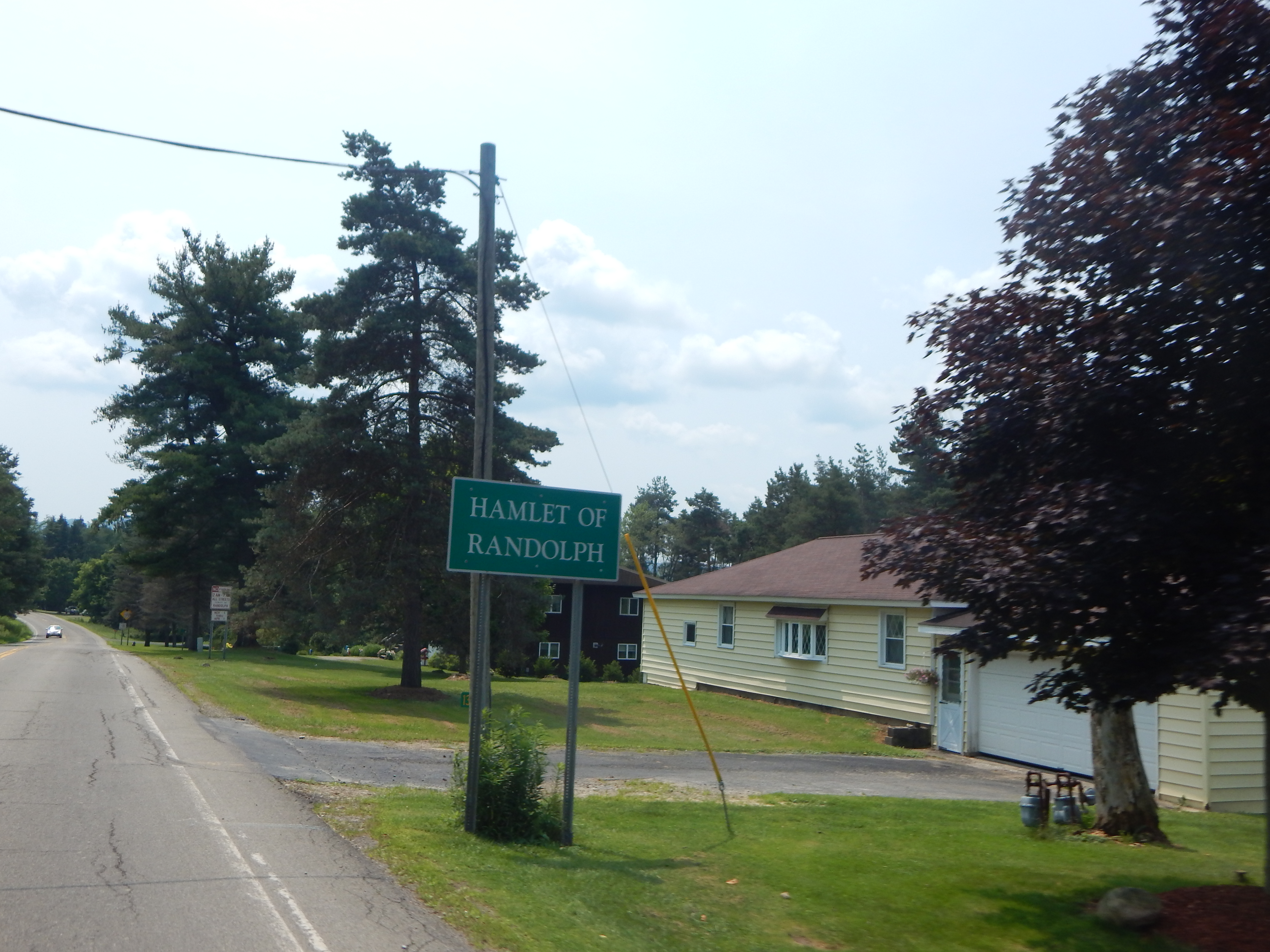
- Signage along NY 241 for the hamlet of Randolph.

- Location within the state of New York
- Coordinates: 42°9′36″N 78°58′59″W
- Country: United States
- State: New York
- County: Cattaraugus
- Town: Randolph
- Settled: 1820
- Incorporated: May 21, 1867
- Dissolved: December 31, 2011

Area
  - Total: 3.26 sq mi (8.45 km^{2})
  - Land: 3.25 sq mi (8.42 km^{2})
  - Water: 0.012 sq mi (0.03 km^{2})
- Elevation: 1,276 ft (389 m)

Population (2020)
  - Total: 1,297
  - Density: 399.0/sq mi (154.04/km^{2})
- Time zone: UTC-5 (Eastern (EST))
  - Summer (DST): UTC-4 (EDT)
- ZIP code: 14772
- Area code: 716
- FIPS code: 36-60576
- GNIS feature ID: 0962181

Randolph is a hamlet, census-designated place (CDP) and former village in Cattaraugus County, New York, United States. It is located within the town of Randolph. The population of the village was 1,286 at the 2010 census, out of 2,602 in the town as a whole. Randolph borders the community of East Randolph.

== History ==
Randolph was the first location settled within the town, circa 1820.

The village of Randolph was incorporated in 1867. Voters in the village approved the dissolution of the village into a hamlet within the town of Randolph on March 16, 2010, becoming one of four villages in the county to have approved a village dissolution plan within a six-month span. East Randolph and Perrysburg approved their dissolution plans on the same day; Limestone had done so in September 2009. At the time of dissolution, Howard MacLaughlin was mayor.

Randolph was once the home of the Chamberlain Institute and Female College, a Methodist school, which closed after a fire. The site of the Chamberlain Institute is now the home of Randolph High School.

The Randolph Historic District was listed on the National Register of Historic Places in 2012.

== Geography ==
Randolph is located at 42°9′35″N 78°58′58″W (42.159992, -78.983044).

According to the United States Census Bureau, the village has a total area of 3.26 square miles (8.45 km^{2}), of which 3.25 square miles (8.42 km^{2}) is land and 0.01 square miles (0.03 km^{2}), or 0.33%, is water.

The village is at the junction of New York State routes 241 and 394, plus County Road 9. County Road 8 enters the village from the west.

The Southern Tier Expressway (Interstate 86 and NY 17) passes through the southwest corner of Randolph, with access from Exit 16. Salamanca is 19 miles (31 km) to the east, and Jamestown is 14 miles (23 km) to the west.

The principal stream of Randolph is Little Conewango Creek. Battle Creek flows into the Little Conewango just outside the hamlet. Little Conewango Creek flows into Conewango Creek, a tributary of the Allegheny River.

== Demographics ==
Historical population
Census	Pop.	Note	%±
2020	1,297		—
U.S. Decennial Census

As of the census of 2000, there were 1,316 people, 550 households, and 343 families residing in the village. The population density was 404.9 inhabitants per square mile (156.3/km^{2}). There were 590 housing units at an average density of 181.5 per square mile (70.1/km^{2}). The racial makeup of the village was 98.48% White, 0.15% Black or African American, 0.38% Native American, 0.08% Pacific Islander, and 0.91% from two or more races. Hispanic or Latino of any race were 0.08% of the population.

There were 550 households, out of which 28.0% had children under the age of 18 living with them, 47.5% were married couples living together, 12.2% had a female householder with no husband present, and 37.6% were non-families. 32.9% of all households were made up of individuals, and 16.0% had someone living alone who was 65 years of age or older. The average household size was 2.37 and the average family size was 3.00.

In the village, the population was spread out, with 24.8% under the age of 18, 8.0% from 18 to 24, 25.5% from 25 to 44, 23.9% from 45 to 64, and 17.8% who were 65 years of age or older. The median age was 39 years. For every 100 females, there were 85.4 males. For every 100 females age 18 and over, there were 83.5 males.

The median income for a household in the village was $32,679, and the median income for a family was $39,861. Males had a median income of $30,750 versus $21,250 for females. The per capita income for the village was $17,812. About 3.7% of families and 6.0% of the population were below the poverty line, including 6.9% of those under age 18 and 6.0% of those age 65 or over.

== Churches of Randolph ==
The former village is home to an Episcopal church, a Presbyterian church, a Baptist church, a Seventh-day Adventist church, a Roman Catholic church, and a non-denominational Bible church. Lighthouse Free Methodist church and the local United Methodist church are located in nearby East Randolph.

== Notable people ==
- Harry Castlemon, writer
- Rodney R. Crowley, former New York Inspector of State Prisons
- Albert G. Dow, former New York state senator
- Marvin Hubbard, former professional football player; he attended school in Randolph but lived in nearby Red House
- Kid McLaughlin, former Major League Baseball player
- Martha Van Rensselaer, founding co-director of Cornell University's New York State College of Home Economics, now the New York State College of Human Ecology
