= Conewango Creek =

Location
- Country: United States

Physical characteristics
- Source: New Albion Lake
  - location: New Albion, New York
  - coordinates: 42°5′30″N 79°8′11″W
  - elevation: 1,238 ft (377 m)
- Mouth
  - location: Warren, Pennsylvania
  - coordinates: 41.8411708°N 79.1453223°W
  - elevation: 1,181 ft (360 m)
- Length: 71 miles
- Basin size: 896.5 mi^{2} (2,322 km^{2})
- Discharge
  - location: Russell, Pennsylvania
  - average: 2,440 cu ft (69 m^{3})

Basin features
- River system: Allegheny River

Conewango Creek is a 71-mile-long (114 km) tributary of the Allegheny River in Pennsylvania and western New York in the United States.

The creek's drainage covers much of southeastern Chautauqua County, New York, and western Cattaraugus County, New York. The creek's most notable tributary is the Chadakoin River, which supplies the creek water from Chautauqua Lake. The Chautauqua Ridge, a continental divide bounds the watershed to the north and west.

== Course ==
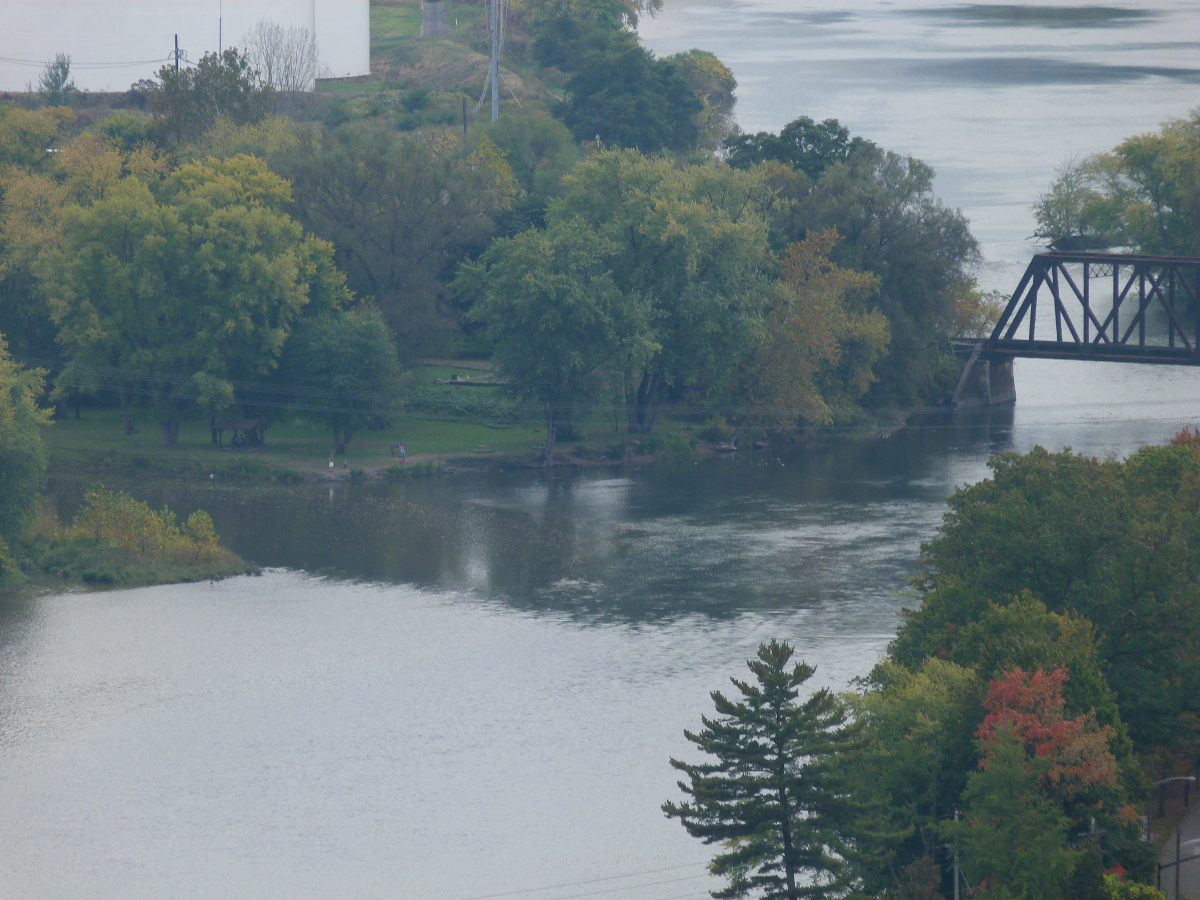
Conewango Creek meets Allegheny River in Warren, Pennsylvania.

Conewango Creek begins at New Albion Lake in New Albion, New York and follows a meandering path around much of western Cattaraugus County. It joins with the Chadakoin River in Frewsburg, New York before heading southward into Pennsylvania.

Conewango Creek joins the Allegheny River at the city of Warren, Pennsylvania.

== River modifications ==
On September 26, 2009, an obsolete Civil War-era low head dam within the city of Warren on the Conewango Creek was removed. Removal of this dam allowed fish migration from the Allegheny River throughout the upper reaches of the Conewango Creek drainage basin.

From August 25 through September 4, 2014, saw the demolition of two Civil War-era remnant dams on the Conewango Creek in North Warren, Pennsylvania. One dam was a partially breached low head dam similar to the dam that was removed downriver in Warren in 2009. Because it was located in close proximity to the Warren State Hospital and used to provide a water supply to that facility in years past, this dam was known as the Hospital Dam. The second dam was a remnant rock and crib dam located immediately upriver of the first. With the removal of the Carter Dam in the autumn of 2009 and the hospital dams in 2014, the entirety of the 71 miles (114 km) course of the Conewango Creek mainstream are open and free of dams, improving the ecology of the Conewango Creek watershed. Removing the dam was a public safety service, and will reconnect most of the Conewango Creek for freshwater mussel host species.

== Pennsylvania River of the Year 2015 ==
On January 16, 2015, it was announced that Conewango Creek won the 2015 Pennsylvania River of the Year contest, an annual competition conducted by the Pennsylvania Department of Conservation and Natural Resources and the Pennsylvania Organization for Watersheds and Rivers since 1983. The general public was invited to vote online for the designation from November 10 through December 15, 2014, choosing from among five waterways across the state.

The winning organization was the Conewango Creek Watershed Association, a non-profit organization based in North Warren, Pennsylvania, who received a $10,000 grant intended to be used to integrate the "River of the Year" message into a river sojourn focusing on the watershed's history, wildlife, local fisheries, and related topics. Other planned activities included a poker run, special fall celebration, creek cleanup, photo contest, and public water safety courses. The association also planned to explore starting a pilot stream ambassador program.

== Natural history ==
The water of the Conewango sustains two rare fish species. The burbot, once common in the headwaters of the Alleghany River but thought to be eradicated has been found in the Conewango. The paddlefish, a native fish, was recently reintroduced to the area. The waterway also is home 19 native, freshwater mussel species, and boasts biodiversity rich in river otters, bald eagles, ospreys, herons, and other wildlife.

== See also ==
- List of rivers of New York
- List of rivers of Pennsylvania
- List of tributaries of the Allegheny River
