= Red House Lake =

- Location within New York Red House Lake (the United States)
- Location: Cattaraugus County, New York, United States
- Coordinates: 42°06′10″N 78°44′41″W
- Type: Lake
- Primary inflows: Red House Brook, Beehunter Creek, Stoddard Creek, McIntosh Creek
- Primary outflows: Red House Brook to Allegheny Reservoir
- Basin countries: United States
- Surface area: 108 acres (0.44 km^{2})
- Average depth: 8 feet (2.4 m)
- Max. depth: 20 feet (6.1 m)
- Shore length^{1}: 1.9 miles (3.1 km)
- Surface elevation: 1,411 feet (430 m)
- Settlements: Salamanca, New York
- ^{1} Shore length is not a well-defined measure.

Red House Lake is an artificial lake located within Allegany State Park in Red House, New York. Fish species present in the lakes are brown trout, rainbow trout, and brook trout. There is a state owned beach launch located 6 miles south of Salamanca. No motors are allowed on the lake.

Red House Lake was originally the site of the Red House town government before it was flooded in the 1920s. The town center was moved to outside the park, first to a site near the railroad and the Allegheny River, then to what was then known as Baystate in the 1970s after the Kinzua Dam was built.
