= Summit Fire Tower =

Tower in New York, US

Coordinates: 42°07′33″N 78°42′04″W

The Summit Fire Tower is a 60-foot-tall (18 m) LS40 Aermotor steel fire lookout tower in Cattaraugus County in the state of New York. The tower is located south of Salamanca on what is known as South Mountain.

== History ==
In 1926, the Allegany State Park Commission built a 60-foot-tall (18 m) LS40 Aermotor steel fire lookout tower on the mountain. By the end of 1928, the park had five towers in operation including the three main towers on Mount Irvine, Mount Tuscarora, and Summit, as well as two more on Red House and Bova Mountain. In 1931, the Bureau of Forest Fire Control took over fire lookout operations of the tower. Due to increased use of aerial detection the tower ceased fire lookout operations at the end of the 1970 fire lookout season. In 2006, a restoration project was completed on the tower and included a reopening ceremony on October 14, 2006. The tower is open to the public during times when the Allegany State Park is open.
