= South Valley, New York =

South Valley, New York Ganöndayoshë’ge:h
- Town
- Location within New York Location within the United States
- Coordinates: 42°1′58″N 78°59′36″W
- Country: United States
- State: New York
- County: Cattaraugus

Area
  - Total: 37.09 sq mi (96.06 km^{2})
  - Land: 36.84 sq mi (95.42 km^{2})
  - Water: 0.25 sq mi (0.64 km^{2})
- Elevation: 1,410 ft (430 m)

Population (2020)
  - Total: 250
  - Estimate (2021): 247
  - Density: 7.1/sq mi (2.74/km^{2})
- Time zone: UTC-5 (Eastern (EST))
  - Summer (DST): UTC-4 (EDT)
- ZIP Code: 14764 (historic, discontinued); 14738 (Frewsburg)
- FIPS code: 36-009-69870
- GNIS feature ID: 0979510
- Website: southvalleyny.com

South Valley (Seneca: Ganöndayoshë’ge:h) is a town in Cattaraugus County, New York, United States. The population was 250 at the 2020 census. The name is derived from the town's geographical attributes.

South Valley is in the southwest corner of the county and is east of the city of Jamestown.

== History ==
The town was first settled in 1798 by Quaker missionaries, who attempted to teach the local Indians agriculture and skills needed to cooperate with non-native settlers. The Quakers started a school in 1803 and erected a sawmill in 1812, but the mill caused dissension in the tribe and, at the request of Seneca leaders Cornplanter and Handsome Lake, was pulled down. Cornplanter (who spent his last years on a tract of land just south of South Valley) maintained respectful relations with the Quakers in his later life, despite differences with the group in regard to cultural assimilation. In 1838 the Quakers intervened to prevent the Ogden Land Company from acquiring the Senecas' land (as had been agreed to in the Treaty of Buffalo Creek), and in 1842 a new Treaty of Buffalo Creek allowed the Senecas to keep their land. The town of South Valley was formed in 1847 from the south part of the town of Randolph.

Much like the then-adjacent town of Red House, South Valley depended heavily on lumber for its early economy, and the town's population peaked in 1890, when over 1,000 residents lived there. The spin-off of Elko and the Panic of 1893 cut the town's population by more than half, starting a decline that would last several decades. Much of the town was evacuated and razed in 1965 when the Kinzua Dam was constructed, as many small communities that once inhabited the town along the Allegheny River were flooded; by 1970, South Valley's population bottomed out at 164 people, a number that has since modestly rebounded. Maps of Cattaraugus County produced today will sometimes make note of the now-mostly abandoned hamlet of Onoville (still marked on I-86 and on navigation signs). A marina was constructed where Onoville used to be. Onoville's name was reputedly the result of objections to the original town's nickname, "Jugville"; after residents exclaimed "oh, no" to using the Jugville name, a fellow resident flippantly suggested "Onoville" instead, which was accepted. Internally, the Seneca Nation of Indians refers to the area under the name Ganöndayoshë’ge:h, a name of uncertain literal meaning.

Onoville had briefly been assigned the ZIP Code 14764. By the time ZIP Codes were rolled out outside the cities in 1963, the Kinzua Dam was already being built. The Onoville post office closed June 30, 1964.

== Geography ==
According to the United States Census Bureau, the town has a total area of 37.1 square miles (96.1 km^{2}), of which 36.8 square miles (95.4 km^{2}) is land and 0.23 square miles (0.6 km^{2}), or 0.67%, is water.

The southern town line is the border of Pennsylvania and the western town line is the border of Chautauqua County.

The Allegheny Reservoir cuts through the town.

The South Valley State Forest occupies much of the town's area.

=== Adjacent towns and areas ===
The south town line is the border of the townships of Pine Grove, Elk, and Mead in Warren County, Pennsylvania, and Corydon Township in McKean County, Pennsylvania. The west town line is the border of the town of Carroll in Chautauqua County, New York. To the east is the Allegany Reservation and the town of Coldspring. North of South Valley is the town of Randolph.

=== Highways ===
New York State Route 950A (West Bank Perimeter Road) is the primary road through South Valley and leads to I-86 and NY 394 to the northeast and Pennsylvania to the southwest. County Road 33 (Bone Run Road) connects NY-950A to U.S. Route 62 in Carroll. County Road 89 (Sawmill Run Road) connects to NY-950A in the former community of Onoville and leads directly to US 62 in Frewsburg.

== Demographics ==
Historical population
| Census | Pop. | Note | %± |
|---|---|---|---|
| 1850 | 561 | | — |
| 1860 | 718 | | 28.0% |
| 1870 | 743 | | 3.5% |
| 1880 | 995 | | 33.9% |
| 1890 | 1,249 | | 25.5% |
| 1900 | 540 | | −56.8% |
| 1910 | 487 | | −9.8% |
| 1920 | 356 | | −26.9% |
| 1930 | 310 | | −12.9% |
| 1940 | 240 | | −22.6% |
| 1950 | 238 | | −0.8% |
| 1960 | 205 | | −13.9% |
| 1970 | 164 | | −20.0% |
| 1980 | 212 | | 29.3% |
| 1990 | 281 | | 32.5% |
| 2000 | 302 | | 7.5% |
| 2010 | 264 | | −12.6% |
| 2020 | 250 | | −5.3% |
| 2021 (est.) | 247 | | −1.2% |
U.S. Decennial Census

As of the census of 2000, there were 302 people, 126 households, and 89 families residing in the town. The population density was 8.2 inhabitants per square mile (3.2/km^{2}). There were 320 housing units at an average density of 8.7 per square mile (3.4/km^{2}). The racial makeup of the town was 98.01% White, 0.33% African American, 1.32% Native American and 0.33% Asian.

There were 126 households, out of which 22.2% had children under the age of 18 living with them, 58.7% were married couples living together, 5.6% had a female householder with no husband present, and 28.6% were non-families. 25.4% of all households were made up of individuals, and 10.3% had someone living alone who was 65 years of age or older. The average household size was 2.40 and the average family size was 2.83.

In the town, the population was spread out, with 20.5% under the age of 18, 4.3% from 18 to 24, 25.5% from 25 to 44, 34.8% from 45 to 64, and 14.9% who were 65 years of age or older. The median age was 44 years. For every 100 females, there were 125.4 males. For every 100 females age 18 and over, there were 122.2 males.

The median income for a household in the town was $38,750, and the median income for a family was $47,188. Males had a median income of $32,188 versus $22,188 for females. The per capita income for the town was $20,541. About 3.8% of families and 6.4% of the population were below the poverty line, including 15.0% of those under the age of eighteen and 10.5% of those 65 or over.

== Communities and locations in South Valley ==
- Allegany Reservation – A reservation of the Seneca Nation that forms part of the east border of the town, along the reservoir.
- Allegheny Reservoir – The reservoir forms a lake in the southeast and cuts off part of the town.
- Highbanks – A campground and resettlement area run by the Seneca Nation Allegany Reservation.
- Onoville Marina – A marina located at the mouth of Sawmill Run at the location of a former community in the town.
- Sawmill Run – A stream that flows eastward into the Allegheny Reservoir, formed by the junction of its North Branch and South Branch (Gurnsey Hollow) near County Road 89. The town government offices are located near this junction.

== Economy ==
A few scattered businesses operate in the town, including two prominent restaurants, the Horseshoe Inn on West Bank Perimeter Road and the Nic-L-Inn on Bone Run Road. Some small convenience stores and boating supply shops operate near the marina.

== Notable person ==
- Carrie B. Raymond, musician and educator
