= Coldspring, New York =

Coldspring, New York Jo:negano:h
- Town
- Location within New York Location within the United States
- Coordinates: 42°6′7″N 78°55′3″W
- Country: United States
- State: New York
- County: Cattaraugus

Government
  - Type: Town Council
  - Town Supervisor: Cathie H. Van Sickle (D, R)
  - Town Council: Members' List: • Wendell C. Anderson (R); • Randall B. Brooks (D); • Kenneth R. Dechow (R); • Robert W. Woodmancy (R)

Area
  - Total: 52.02 sq mi (134.73 km^{2})
  - Land: 51.46 sq mi (133.29 km^{2})
  - Water: 0.55 sq mi (1.43 km^{2})
- Elevation: 1,413 ft (431 m)

Population (2020)
  - Total: 661
  - Estimate (2021): 656
  - Density: 12.7/sq mi (4.89/km^{2})
- Time zone: Eastern (EST)
- ZIP Codes: 14783 (Steamburg); 14755 (Little Valley); 14772 (Randolph); 14779 (Salamanca)
- FIPS code: 36-009-16903
- Website: townofcoldspringny.gov

Coldspring (Seneca: Jo:negano:h) is a town in Cattaraugus County, New York, United States. As of the 2020 census it had a population of 661. It is located in the southwest part of the county, west of the city of Salamanca.

== History ==
The first settler arrived circa 1818. The Town of Coldspring was established in 1837 from a part of the town of Napoli. In 1847 and 1848, part of the town was added to the town of South Valley.

In 1965, the town of Coldspring voted 45–0 to annex the former town of Elko (also known as Quaker Bridge) after it was flooded in the Allegheny Reservoir and dissolved. Elko had been formed in 1890 from part of the town of South Valley and is now the south part of Coldspring. Elko had first been settled by Quakers, acting as missionaries to the local natives in 1798 at the invitation of Cornplanter, a local Seneca diplomat. It currently has no permanent population, as virtually all of Elko's territory is now either under the reservoir or within the bounds of Allegany State Park. The absorption of Elko and relocation of former residents in the Reservoir's floodplain (including a 160-acre resettlement area for the Seneca) helped boost the town's population.

== Geography ==
According to the United States Census Bureau, the town of Coldspring has a total area of 52.0 square miles (134.7 km^{2}), of which 51.5 square miles (133.3 km^{2}) is land and 0.54 square miles (1.4 km^{2}), or 1.06%, is water.

The south town line is the boundary of Pennsylvania, and the Allegheny River, impounded as the Allegheny Reservoir, divides the town into northern and southern sections. Mount Tuscarora rises in the southern part of the town within Allegany State Park.

New York State Route 394 and Interstate 86 pass through the town.

=== Adjacent towns and areas ===
To the north is the town of Napoli. Coldspring shares its western border with the towns of South Valley and Randolph. The east border is formed by the towns of Salamanca and Red House. Corydon Township in McKean County, Pennsylvania, is at the south town line.

== Demographics ==
Historical population
Census	Pop.	Note	%±
1840	673		—
1850	591		−12.2%
1860	667		12.9%
1870	835		25.2%
1880	984		17.8%
1890	901		−8.4%
1900	870		−3.4%
1910	685		−21.3%
1920	567		−17.2%
1930	541		−4.6%
1940	596		10.2%
1950	619		3.9%
1960	580		−6.3%
1970	638		10.0%
1980	708		11.0%
1990	732		3.4%
2000	751		2.6%
2010	663		−11.7%
2020	661		−0.3%
2021 (est.)	656		−0.8%
U.S. Decennial Census

As of the census of 2000, there were 751 people, 278 households, and 205 families residing in the town. The population density was 14.6 inhabitants per square mile (5.6/km^{2}). There were 371 housing units at an average density of 7.2 per square mile (2.8/km^{2}). The racial makeup of the town was 97.20% White, 0.27% African American, 1.60% Native American, and 0.93% from two or more races. Hispanic or Latino of any race were 0.40% of the population.

There were 278 households, out of which 34.5% had children under the age of 18 living with them, 59.4% were married couples living together, 6.8% had a female householder with no husband present, and 25.9% were non-families. 18.0% of all households were made up of individuals, and 9.0% had someone living alone who was 65 years of age or older. The average household size was 2.70 and the average family size was 3.08.

In the town, the population was spread out, with 27.0% under the age of 18, 6.3% from 18 to 24, 26.1% from 25 to 44, 26.0% from 45 to 64, and 14.6% who were 65 years of age or older. The median age was 39 years. For every 100 females, there were 105.2 males. For every 100 females age 18 and over, there were 100.7 males.

The median income for a household in the town was $31,063, and the median income for a family was $35,938. Males had a median income of $29,479 versus $16,458 for females. The per capita income for the town was $14,568. About 10.2% of families and 15.0% of the population were below the poverty line, including 16.1% of those under age 18 and 10.8% of those age 65 or over.

== Communities and locations in Coldspring ==
- Allegany Reservation – A reservation of the Iroquois that cuts across the center of the town, on either side of the Allegheny River. The territory within Coldspring is designated in the Seneca language as jonegano:h or tsyo:nekano:h depending on the transcription system; the name is used along I-86 as the Seneca name for the town of Coldspring, the community of Steamburg, and the Cold Spring Creek.
- Allegheny Reservoir – An artificial lake created by a dam on the Allegheny River.
- Allegany State Park – A section of the park is in the southeast part of the town.
- Coldspring – A hamlet by the Allegheny Reservoir. Mostly abandoned in the construction of Kinzua Dam.
- Price Corners – A hamlet at the junction of County Road 9 and Route 394 by the western town line.
- Quaker Bridge – A hamlet at the junction of NY 280 and modern Allegany State Park Route 3. Abandoned in the construction of Kinzua Dam and mostly underwater.
- Quaker Lake – A lake located south of the hamlet of Coldspring.
- Randolph State Fish Hatchery – A location in the northwest part of the town.
- Sawmill Run – A hamlet partially in the northeastern corner of the town, with the rest in the neighboring Town of Salamanca.
- Steamburg – A hamlet located near the center of the town on NY Route 394 and north of Interstate 86. Steamburg is the major community in the town and the seat of the town government.
- Steamburg Resettlement Area – A location south of Steamburg, within the reservation bounds.
- Underwood Corners – A point at the intersection of County Routes 10 and 39, north of Steamburg.
