= Ski country =

Region of the northeastern United States with many ski resorts

The eastern half of the maroon portions on this map is the approximate reach of ski country in New York and Pennsylvania.

Ski country is the hilly, snowy portions of the boundary between the Niagara Frontier and the Southern Tier of the western part of New York.

== Weather ==
The area is a largely hilly terrain, mostly downwind from Lake Erie, Lake Ontario and the Finger Lakes, along the Eastern Continental Divide between the Great Lakes, the Mississippi River and Susquehanna River watersheds. The result of this is that through orographic lift, a significant amount of lake effect snow falls there during the months of November, December and January.

The portion of ski country in Western New York is defined by a geologic formation known as the Chautauqua Ridge.

== Ski destinations ==
As the name implies, the area is particularly popular with skiers, and there are several ski resorts that stretch from Pennsylvania into Central New York. The local ski resorts primarily offer alpine skiing while the numerous state parks use their hiking trails for cross-country skiing. Overall, the state of New York is the third-most popular skiing destination in the United States, behind Colorado and California, with neighboring Vermont a close fourth.

New York ranks first in the country for the most ski resorts, with over 50, counting the myriad local non-destination resorts.

=== Resorts ===
Pennsylvania

- Mount Pleasant of Edinboro - in Edinboro, Pennsylvania installed first chair lift in 2014 (also offers snow tubing)
- Ski Denton/Denton Hill - in Coudersport, Pennsylvania (slightly outside the general definition of ski country, no longer in operation)

New York

- Big Basin Ski Area - in Red House, New York. Operated from 1951 until New York's ongoing eminent domain campaign forced most of Red House's private property to be vacated in 1972.
- Bluemont Ski Area - Yorkshire, New York - closed in 1982
- Bova Ski Resort - in Red House, New York. Bova (named after the Beauvais family, who donated the land) was the site of a Great Depression-era public works project as part of Allegany State Park that would serve as the area's first ski destination. The Bova resort also included the region's only ski jumps. The ski jumps were damaged by a mudslide in 1979, and outdated and malfunctioning equipment led to the area's shutdown in 1980.
- Brantling Ski Slopes - in Sodus, New York
- Bristol Mountain - in South Bristol, New York (also offers Nordic skiing)
- Buffalo Ski Club - in Colden
- Cockaigne Ski Resort - in Cherry Creek (town), New York
- Dry Hill Ski Area - in Watertown, New York
- Greek Peak - in Virgil, New York near the city of Cortland
- Grosstal/Wing Hollow Ski Area - in Allegany, New York (closed in early 80's)
- Holiday Valley - in Ellicottville (town), New York
- Holimont - in Ellicottville (also offers Nordic skiing)
- Poverty Hill/Concord Ski Club - in Ellicottville (closed 1991, land currently being repurposed)
- Kissing Bridge - in Glenwood, New York within the town of Colden
- Labrador Mountain - in Truxton, New York
- Mount Hermanns - in Olean, was the first commercial ski resort in the area and was established in the 1930s. It closed after several decades of operation due to competition from other, newer resorts in the area.
- Peek'n Peak - in Clymer, New York
- Snow Ridge Ski Resort - in Turin, New York
- Song Mountain Resort - in Tully, New York
- Swain Ski Resort - in Grove, New York
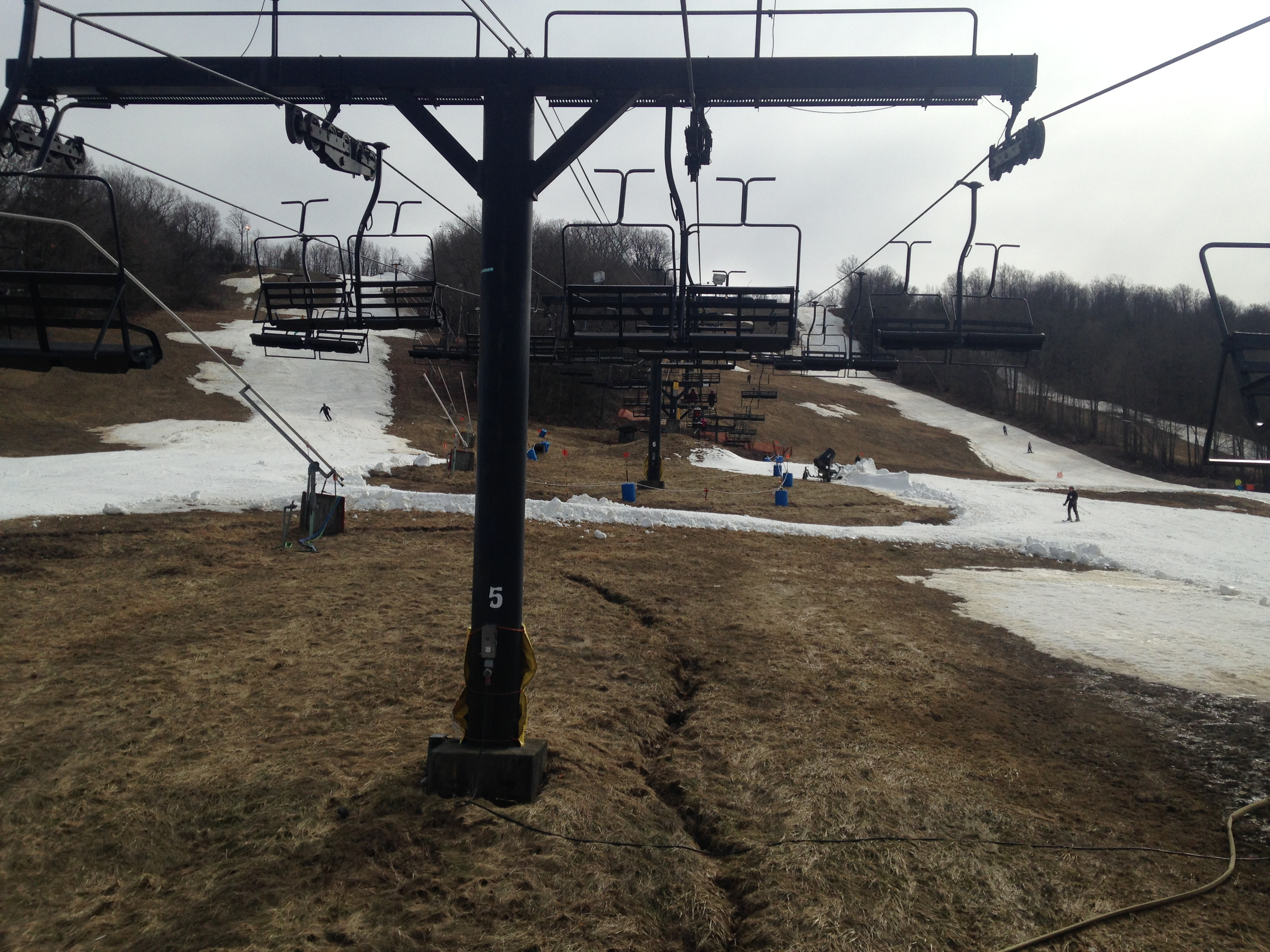
  Swain from main double lift in early March 2017
- Toggenburg Mountain - in Fabius, New York

=== State parks ===
- Art Roscoe Ski Area at Allegany State Park in Red House, New York
- Keuka Lake State Park in Jerusalem, New York
- Letchworth State Park in Livingston County, New York
- Long Point State Park on Lake Chautauqua near Maple Springs, New York

== See also ==
- List of ski areas and resorts in the United States
- Tug Hill Plateau
