= Mount Pleasant of Edinboro =

Ski area in Pennsylvania, United States

- Interactive map of Mount Pleasant of Edinboro
- Location: Washington Township, Erie County, Pennsylvania, United States
- Nearest city: Edinboro, Pennsylvania
- Coordinates: 41°51′04″N 80°04′13″W
- Vertical: 350 ft (110 m)
- Top elevation: 1,551 ft (473 m)
- Trails: 9 total
- Longest run: 3,500
- Lift system: 4 total
- Snowfall: Over 150"

Mount Pleasant of Edinboro is a small ski resort nestled in the "ski country" snowbelt region of northwestern Pennsylvania, USA, near Edinboro, in Erie County. It offers an array of challenging terrain and conditions.
