= Elko, New York =

Elko, New York Tunesassa
- Town
- Nickname: Quaker Bridge
- Location within New York Location within the United States
- Coordinates: 42.057°N 78.881°W
- Country: United States
- State: New York
- County: Cattaraugus
- Established: 1890
- Dissolved: 1965

Government (Historic, final occupants listed)
  - Type: Town Council
  - Town Supervisor: William Smallback (D)

Area
  - Total: 22.49 sq mi (58.25 km^{2})

Population (1960)
  - Total: 73
  - Estimate (2026): 0
  - Density: 3.2/sq mi (1.25/km^{2})
- Time zone: UTC-5 (Eastern (EST))
  - Summer (DST): UTC-4 (EDT)
- ZIP Codes: 14771 (Quaker Bridge)
- Area code: 716

 

Elko was a town in Cattaraugus County, New York that existed from 1890 to 1965. It was forcibly evacuated in 1965 due to the construction of the Kinzua Dam on the Allegheny River in Warren County, Pennsylvania, one of the largest dams in the United States east of the Mississippi. The dam was authorized by the United States Congress as a flood control measure in the Flood Control Acts of 1936 and 1938, and was built by the U. S. Army Corps of Engineers beginning in 1960. Other benefits from the dam include drought control, hydroelectric power production, and recreation.

As of the 1950 United States census, the most recent for which census data for the town is available online, 95 people were residents of Elko.

== History ==
Elko was one of the first areas in Cattaraugus County to be settled by Europeans. The Quakers, with the blessing of Seneca diplomat Cornplanter, established a mission on the Allegany Indian Reservation beginning in 1798. The first permanent settlements were established in 1803, and the landmark Quaker Bridge was constructed in 1867. Wolf Run was not settled until several decades later; in 1955, Frank Carnahan, whose family had occupied much of the area of Wolf Run until being bought out by the state in 1935, recalled that one other family (the Fullers) preceded the Carnahans in Wolf Run.

The Town of Elko was founded in 1890 from territory previously belonging to South Valley. Its creation (Elko was the 33rd and final township to be created in Cattaraugus County) was allegedly a political maneuver to move the balance of power in the county southward and get the county seat moved to Salamanca, an effort that was approved 18–15 by the county board of supervisors but rejected in a public referendum; the seat remains located in Little Valley. Oil magnate Amasa Stone built a large portion of his estate in the town, and it was an agent of his that suggested the town's name. The town's formation came at a time when the lumber industry in southwestern Cattaraugus County was briefly booming; over 2,000 people were resident in the towns of Elko, South Valley and Red House in 1890, ten times as many residents as there are in the area as of 2010. Most of its usable land was located on the Allegany Indian Reservation, which complicated the town's development. The town's numerous creeks (Quaker Run, Hotchkiss Hollow and Wolf Run) all provided ample hydropower for sawmills, an early driver of the area's economy; this eventually subsided when steam power grew to dominate.

In 1921, with the opening of Allegany State Park, the town of Elko positioned itself as a gateway town targeting the tourists who would pass through on their way into the park.

In 1941, the Buffalo Courier-Express penned a summary of the town, noting that at the time, it was the smallest in Western New York, was too small to cover interest payments and thus could not afford to incur any debts. The town was still served by one-room schools, one in each of the town's three districts (Hotchkiss Hollow, Quaker Bridge and Wolf Run), though no children were of school age in Hotchkiss Hollow at the time as the most recent had graduated in 1939. There were no churches in the town, and residents had to travel to Steamburg for the nearest churches. Its commerce consisted of a processing plant operated by the Fairmont Creamery, a general store (which doubled as the post office), a garage, and a service station, along with several family farms. The summary also noted numerous civic organizations, including the Farm Bureau, 4-H, Home Bureau, and Nursing Committee, all of which operated out of the town hall for substantial gatherings.

Elko was forcibly evacuated in spring 1965 as part of the Kinzua Dam construction. That August, the remaining residents voted 13–1 to dissolve the town and give its remaining equipment and land to the neighboring town of Coldspring, which concurrently voted 45–0 to annex the town. The landmark Quaker Bridge was demolished and replaced with one several miles upstream, near Steamburg, when the Southern Tier Expressway was built, and the highways serving Elko were all reconfigured to eliminate most of the town's infrastructure (after the construction of the dam, the town was left with only one road to maintain, Hotchkiss Hollow Road).

William Smallback, a Democrat, was the town's last supervisor, serving from 1960 to 1965 and breaking a string in which the town had almost universally voted for Republicans. His wife served as town clerk. Smallback's son has speculated that the state's frequent personal disputes with Smallback had played a role in the government's handling of the Elko evictions; Smallback defied the eviction order and returned with his family to Elko to participate in the dissolution vote.

== Geography ==
Elko was situated in the southern portion of the county. Coldspring bordered it to the north, South Valley to the west, Corydon, Pennsylvania to the south, and Red House to the east.

Elko straddled the Allegheny River and the Allegany Indian Reservation, with the majority of the town's land situated southeast of the river and the population mostly centered in the northwest. In all, 14,393 acres of territory were within Elko's bounds. Quaker Run met the Allegheny south of the site of Quaker Bridge. Mount Tuscarora was located in the geographic center of Elko.

New York State Route 280, in its original configuration, was the primary road through the town's population centers. Prior to this, the Western New York & Pennsylvania Railroad (WNY&P) served Elko.

== Demographics ==
Historical population
Census	Pop.	Note	%±
1900	571		—
1910	246		−56.9%
1920	220		−10.6%
1930	160		−27.3%
1940	125		−21.9%
1950	95		−24.0%
1960	73		−23.2%

As of the 1940 United States census, 125 people were resident in the town, all of them White, not counting those on the reservation; an internal Seneca Nation of Indians census of the portion of the reservation within Elko counted 110 people. There were approximately 30 families in the town: five in Hotchkiss Hollow, 24 in Quaker Bridge and one on Wolf Run. There were 13 children of school age served by the two schools in Elko, ten in Quaker Bridge and three on Wolf Run.

There were 75 registered voters in Elko; among those with a party affiliation, there were roughly twice as many Republicans as there were Democrats.

== Communities and locations in Elko ==
=== Quaker Bridge ===
Quaker Bridge (Seneca: Ha’deyoyá:ya’kdöh or Joyá:ya’kdöh) was the center of government and most heavily populated place in Elko; most people knew of the territory by "Quaker Bridge" and not "Elko." It was the site of a large bridge across the Allegheny River and a Quaker school dating to 1816; the Quakers still operated the school in 1941, only as a summer school. Prior to 1921, the United States Postal Service referred to the town as Tunesassa, after the location's Seneca language name (roughly translated to "the place of fine sands," i.e. a beach); unable to convince the WNY&P to change the name of the Quaker Bridge rail station, the town residents successfully petitioned the Postal Service and the Board on Geographic Names to change the office's name to Quaker Bridge to match the rail station.

Of Elko's territory, Quaker Bridge was most directly affected by the Kinzua Dam construction and was made uninhabitable by the flooding. The Friends Boat Launch is located in the general vicinity of where the hamlet used to be, and privately owned campsites occupy the location across the reservoir from the boat launch. A gap in the ZIP code numbering system implies Quaker Bridge was to be assigned the ZIP code 14771, although by the time the ZIP code system was introduced for rural areas in 1963, the Kinzua Dam was already being constructed, and it was likely never used. The post office, whose postmaster also ran the local trading post, closed September 30, 1964.

=== Wolf Run ===
Wolf Run (Seneca: Gasdë:gö:h) or Fishbasket was a relatively minor hamlet in the central/southern portion of the town. Built mainly as a lumber road along Wolf Run, its only major developments were a rail station and a small hotel. There were several families and farms in the Wolf Run area at the start of the 20th century. In 1935, the Carnahan family, which by then had grown to dominate the valley, accepted a buyout from Allegany State Park and sold their lands, leaving only one other family there, the Reitz family. The Reitzes left in 1964 as the time the Kinzua Dam was being constructed; the Wolf Run area is currently a ghost town within the area of Allegany State Park, with a cemetery and some scattered foundations remaining. It reportedly got its name from an agent of the Holland Land Company who uncovered a den of wolf cubs while hunting in the area. Inasmuch as the name "Elko" was used in the town of Elko, it was generally limited to this area, which was separated from Quaker Bridge by Mount Tuscarora (then known as South Hill). It was at this location that the Elko post office was stationed. Opened in 1887, the office was still noted as operational as late as 1922.

=== Hotchkiss Hollow ===
Hotchkiss Hollow constituted the northwestern corner of the town. It is the only portion of the town outside the bounds of the reservation or state park and is now part of the town of Coldspring.

=== Frecks ===
Prior to 1921, Frecks straddled the border between Red House and Elko. In homage to the Quakers' settling of the territory, the former hamlet of Frecks is now the center of the Quaker area of Allegany State Park.

== See also ==
- Kinzua Township, Warren County, Pennsylvania
