= Quaker Lake =

Reservoir in Cattaraugus County, New York, United States

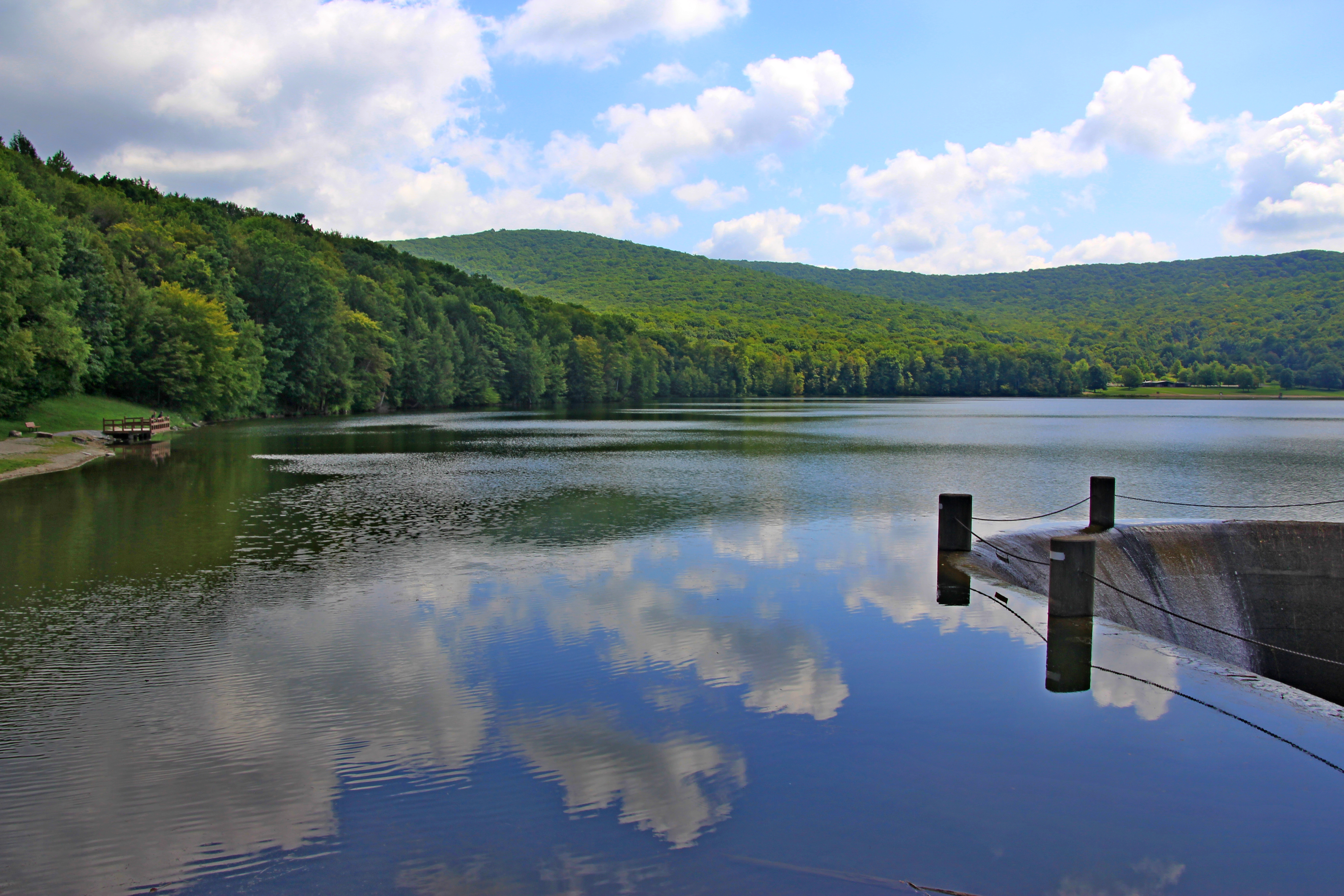
- Quaker Lake in 2014

- Location within New York Location within the United States
- Location: Cattaraugus County, New York
- Coordinates: 42°02′42″N 78°52′09″W
- Primary inflows: Quaker Run
- Primary outflows: Allegheny Reservoir
- Basin countries: United States
- Surface area: 270 acres (1.1 km^{2})
- Average depth: 15 ft (4.6 m)
- Max. depth: 40 ft (12 m)
- Surface elevation: 1,340 ft (410 m)
- Settlements: Coldspring, New York

Quaker Lake is located south of Coldspring, New York. Fish species present in the lake are rainbow trout, brown trout, brook trout, and black bullhead. There is a state owned carry down launch located in Allegany State Park off NY-280. The state park also offers a swimming area and facilities on the lake.

Quaker Lake was constructed in the 1960s, one of the byproducts of the Kinzua Dam construction. A spillway across Route 280 empties the lake into the Allegheny Reservoir.
