= Allegany State Park =

State park in New York, US

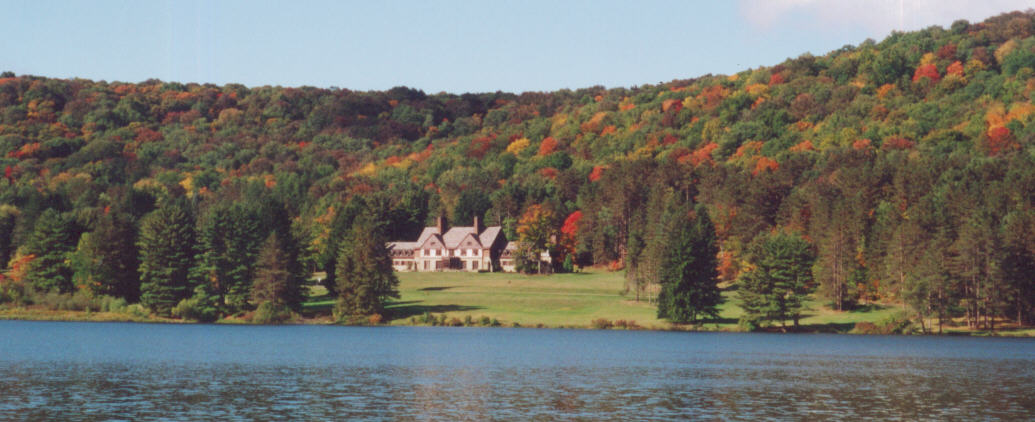
- The park's Red House Administration Building from across Red House Lake.

- Location within New York
- Interactive map of Allegany State Park
- Type: State park
- Location: Cattaraugus County, New York
- Coordinates: 42°06′54″N 78°43′12″W
- Area: 64,800 acres (262 km^{2})
- Created: July 30, 1921
- Operator: New York State Office of Parks, Recreation and Historic Preservation
- Open: All year

Allegany State Park is a state park in western New York State, located in Cattaraugus County just north of the Allegheny National Forest in Pennsylvania. The park is divided into two sections: The Red House Area and the Quaker Run Area. It lies within the Allegheny Highlands forests ecoregion.

The Red House Area is the northeastern half of Allegany State Park. The Red House area's attractions include Stone Tower, the Summit Fire Tower, Red House Lake, Bridal Falls, and the Art Roscoe Ski Area. This section also contains five miles (8.0 km) of paved bike trails and 130 camp sites. The Red House area is the location of the Administration Building for the park.

The Quaker area is the southwestern section of the park. Its attractions include Quaker Lake, the Mount Tuscarora Fire Tower, hiking trails, Science lake, Bear Caves, Thunder Rocks, the Quaker Amphitheater, and several campsites. The Cain Hollow campground is located on the Quaker side of the park.

Allegany State Park was named as a top "Amazing Spot" in the nation in 2007. It has also been referred to as "the wilderness playground of Western New York."

The park is 1 of 80 New York State Parks that was in the path of totality for the 2024 solar eclipse, with 1 minute and 42 seconds of totality.

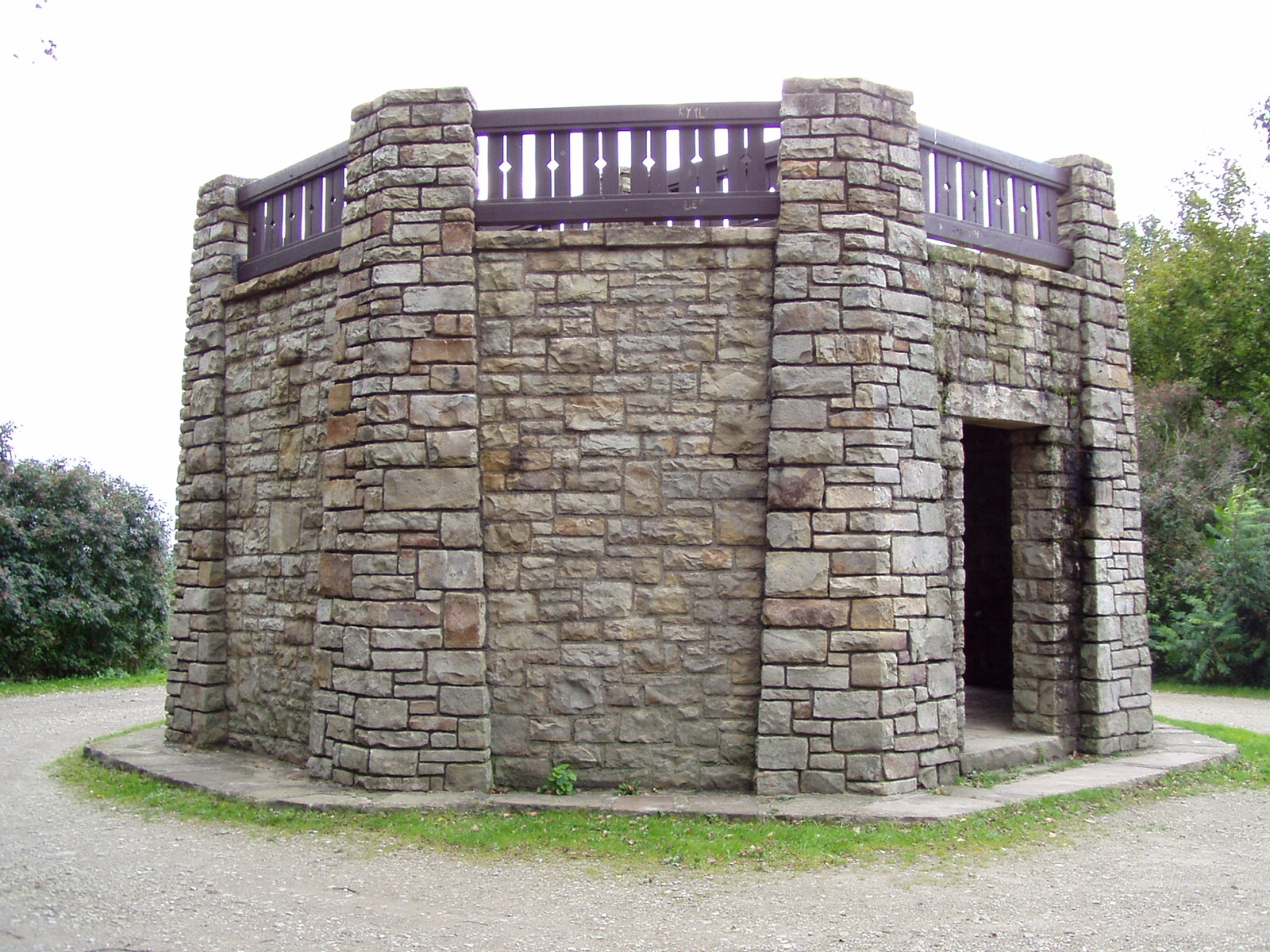
Stone tower near Summit in Red House 42.129785°N 78.719263°W

== History ==
The 64,800-acre (262 km^{2}) Allegany State Park began on May 2, 1921, when an Act of the New York State Legislature approved the purchase of two tracts of land in the Quaker Run Valley. The act provided $25,000 in state funds for the purchase of land, provided that an equal amount in private funds be raised first. The first tract, consisting of 7,020 acres (28.4 km^{2}) of land belonging to the heirs of Amasa Stone, was purchased for $31,500 on June 18, 1921. The second tract consisted of 150 acres (0.61 km^{2}) of land and buildings adjacent to the Stone Estate. The price for this property was $4,300. The park was formally dedicated on July 30, 1921.

Senator Albert T. Fancher was appointed by New York Governor Nathan Lewis Miller to head a five-member team to develop a vast park that continues to grow to this day. Fancher is known as the "Father of Allegany State Park," and the seven Fancher Cottages in Allegany State Park are named after him.

A converted schoolhouse (near the present day Quaker Inn) served as the park's first administration building, and World War I Army surplus tents on 16-by-16-foot (4.9 by 4.9 m) wooden platforms were primarily used during the time between the park's creation until the completion of the first permanent cabins in 1925.

The first State Park Bond Issue was passed in 1924, and provided funds for the development of the Redhouse Area, including the construction of the Redhouse Administration Building and the building of the Redhouse Dam, which created Redhouse Lake.

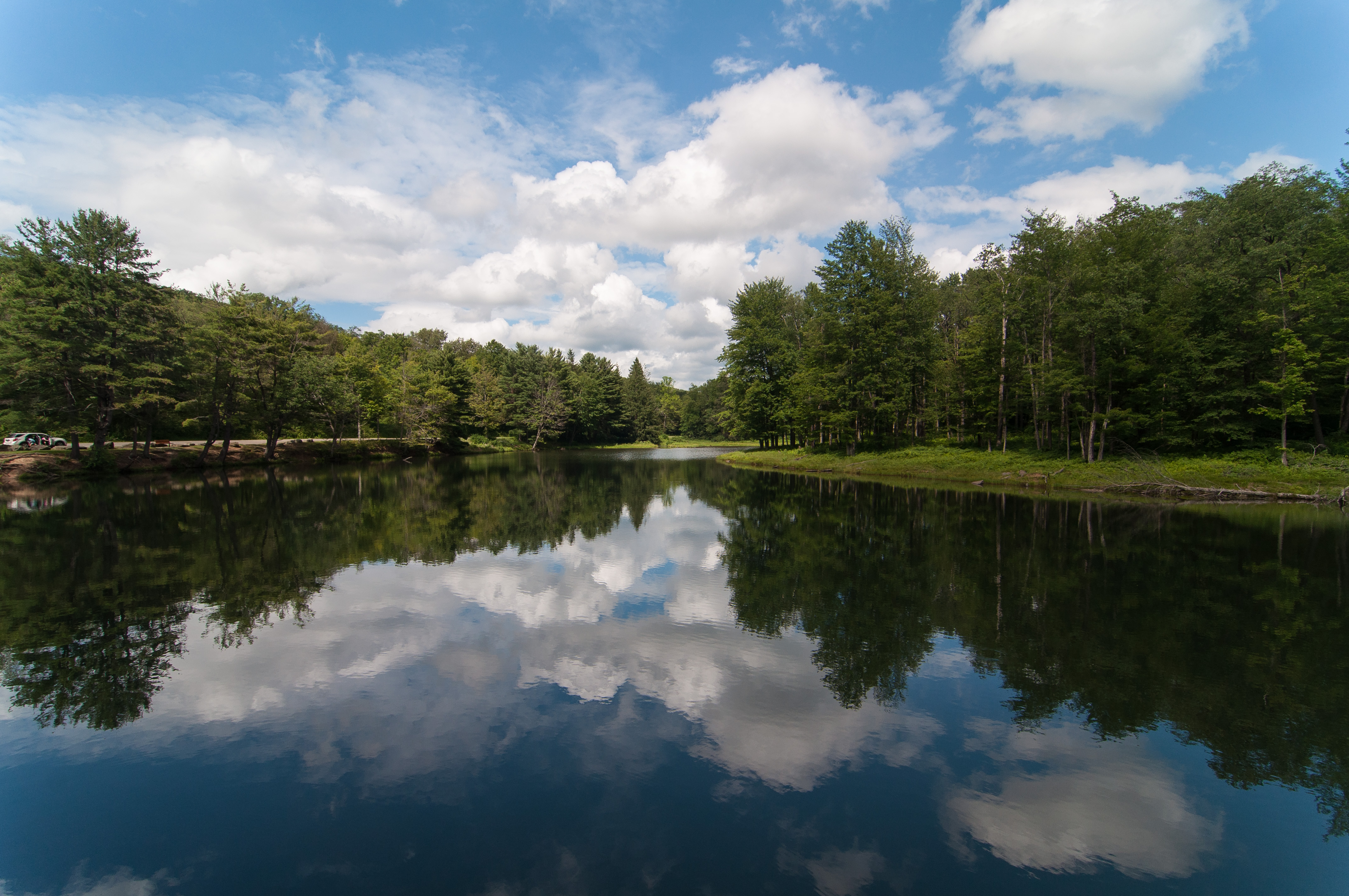
Science Lake

In 1926, Science Lake was built and offered the first official swimming area in the park. Adjoining the lake was the Allegany School Of Natural History, a group of 42 cabins, and a main building housing a library, several science laboratories, and an assembly room.

The park was developed extensively between 1933 and 1942 when the Civilian Conservation Corps (CCC) took on the project of building roads, bridges, camping areas, trails, picnic areas and a ski resort. The CCC were also responsible for numerous conservation projects from reforestation to stream bank retention and wildlife improvements.

Through the years, the park was developed further with the addition of Quaker Lake, winterized cabins and full service cottages, hiking and snowmobile trails, picnic and recreation areas, bike and horse paths, and better roads enabling people to access the park. A ski facility was constructed in the park in the 1930s; the Bova ski area, which featured traditional alpine skiing and ski jumps, closed down in 1980 because of disrepair. Cross-country skiing is still available in the park.

By the 1960s, Allegany State Park had expanded to the point where it covered almost all of the towns of Red House and Elko, as well as much of the town of Carrollton. During this time, two major projects along the Allegheny River, the Kinzua Dam to the south and the Southern Tier Expressway to the north, were underway, and the state of New York attempted to evict those who remained in Elko and Red House through eminent domain using those projects as a pretense; what usable land that remained would be integrated into the park or handed to the Seneca Nation of Indians as compensation. Elko was successfully vacated and dissolved, but many of the remaining residents of Red House, among them the family of Pro Bowl fullback Marv Hubbard, managed to fight their evictions. To this day, a small northwestern corner of Allegany State Park is notched out, with 14 houses still mostly privately held by 38 residents. The state maintains a standing offer to the residents of Red House to buy out their property should it ever be abandoned.

=== Dance halls ===
Among some of the park's rich history is the Old Quaker Dance Hall. The dance hall was located off ASP 3 across the creek from the Quaker Inn, near the Brow Cabin Trail and the Quaker Maintenance Area, and was torn down in 2002 due to its poor condition. Many dances occurred here through the Great Depression era into the mid-20th century. Bands would play live music at the hall while scores of people danced on the large dance floor.

The Redhouse Dance Pavilion was located along Redhouse Lake, near the beach parking lot. The old dance hall was built upon the concrete barn floor of a farmer,(John Sharpe), that formerly owned the land. As with the Quaker Dance Hall, weekend dances were held at the Redhouse Dance hall throughout the summer, from the 1920s through the rock & roll era.

The Redhouse Dance Pavilion was last used for an Independence Day dance in 1973. The building then housed a game room until it was torn down in 1984. The Redhouse Miniature Golf Course was later built on the same concrete floor; that facility was torn out in the late 2000s and the site is currently a vacant lot, with only the overhead lights remaining.

An amphitheater was constructed on the Quaker side of the park. It is the traditional home of the park's long-running hootenanny, which was held from 1972 to 2019.

=== New Ireland ===
Also a part of the history is the settlement of New Ireland (Carrollton, New York) which was formed in the mid-19th century by a small group of Irish settlers who had fled the pains of the Great Famine. It is near Limestone but within the boundaries of Allegany State Park. The village since was incorporated into Limestone, and no longer exists. Ruins of the old village are still visible and are accessible from the Limestone Run Road.

=== Park fire towers ===
Due to the danger of forest fires, and the damage caused by them in New York State Parks, three fire lookout towers were constructed. The first; Summit Fire Tower; was completed in 1926. It stands 66 feet (20 m) tall. The other fire towers were at Mt. Tuscarora Fire Tower located in the Quaker Area, and the Mt. Irvine Fire Tower, located in the Rice Brook (Limestone) area. The Mt. Tuscarora Fire Tower still stands today, near Quaker Lake. The Mt. Irvine Fire Tower, however, was disassembled by the park and moved to Science Hill near the Bradford, Pennsylvania entrance. When all the fire towers were abandoned in favor of aerial surveillance in 1971, the Mt. Irvine tower was the only one taken down by park personnel in the early 1970s. It was saved however, when reassembled by a BOCES class in Ellicottville.

=== Gas lease ===
Contained within the park off France Brook Road is a large storage pool for natural gas. Formerly a large gas well, the Limestone Storage Pool is operated by National Fuel Gas Supply Corporation. National Fuel leases rights to maintain and operate over 20 wells it uses to store and regulate the natural gas it stores in the massive underground sandstone deposit. The storage pool is connected to the "K" line, which is a 16-inch (0.41 m) diameter gas pipeline that runs from Buffalo, New York to Eldred, Pennsylvania. The pool is regulated by equipment located in a compression station situated on the access road near the Bova Ski Area and Camp Allegany. The gas stored in this pool is used by the park (which it receives for free as part of the agreement), and by local industries requiring high-pressure, high-volume gas supply. The rest of the gas is used on the K line for distribution in New York and Pennsylvania.

A master plan, adopted in 2010, provides protection from oil and gas drilling within the park.

== Park roads ==
The park uses a system of three main roads linking the Red House area and the Quaker Run area, and serving as major thoroughfares in the Red House and Quaker Run Areas.

- Allegany State Park Route 1 (ASP Route 1) runs north-to-south through the middle of the park. ASP Route 1 runs between the park's entrance from exit 21 of the Southern Tier Expressway (Interstate 86 and New York State Route 17) in Salamanca, to its intersection with ASP Route 3 in the Quaker Run Area near the Quaker Rental Office. ASP Route 1 also intersects with ASP Route 2 by Redhouse Lake. Winding ASP Route 1, historically known as Stoddard Road before the park was constructed, is shut down and used only as a snowmobile trail during the winter. The route becomes New York State Route 951M (an unsigned reference route) at the park's northern border.

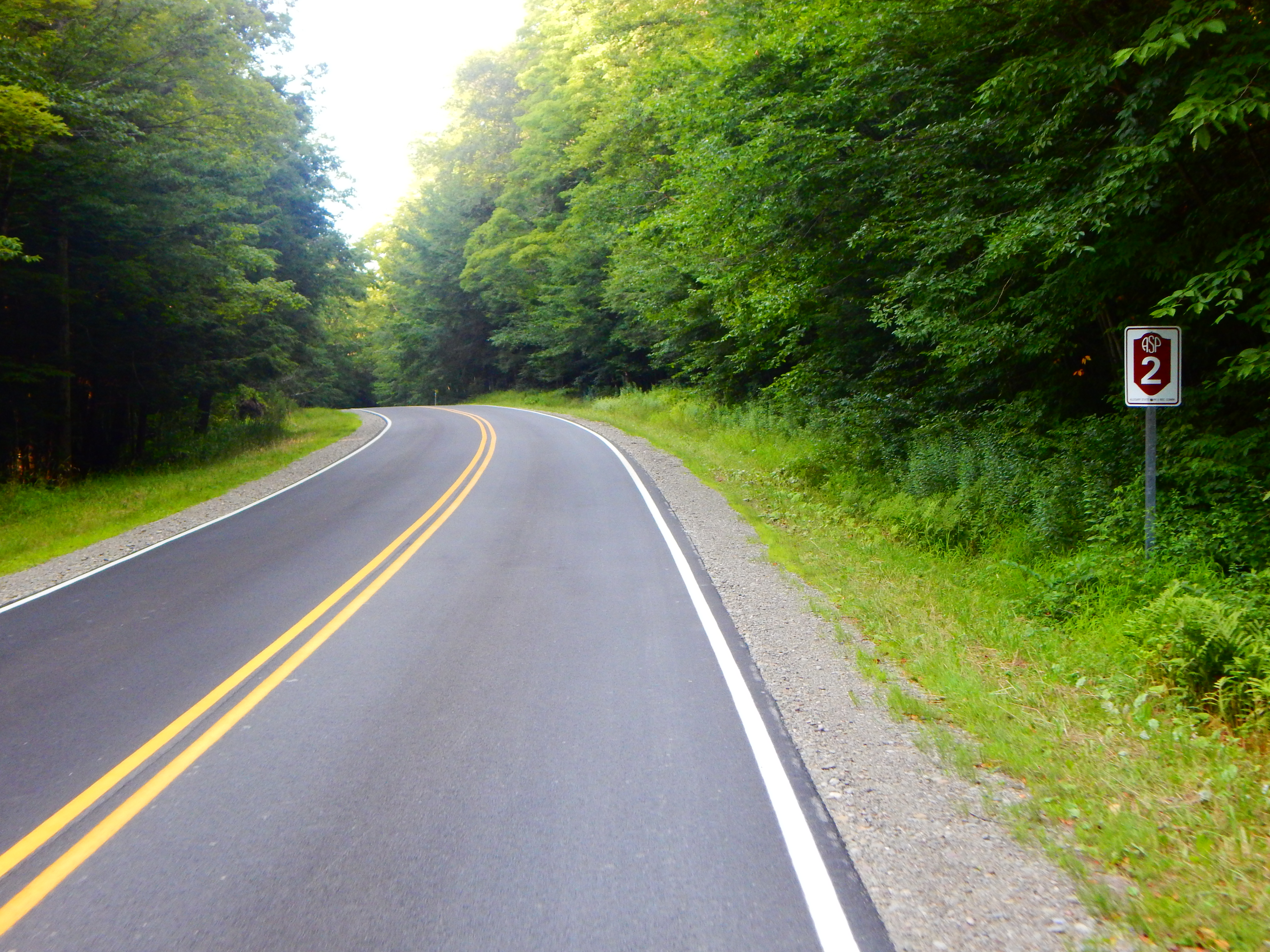
ASP Route 2 in the Red House Area

- Allegany State Park Route 2 (ASP Route 2) runs west to east along the northern part of the park and then north to south along the eastern side of the park. ASP Route 2 runs from exit 19 of the Southern Tier Expressway (the former New York State Route 382) in the town of Red House, New York to its intersection with ASP Route 3 at the Bradford, Pennsylvania, entrance of the park. ASP Route 2 also intersects with ASP Route 1 by Redhouse Lake. ASP Route 2 to ASP Route 3 is the sole automobile road between Red House and Quaker Run within Allegany State Park during the winter.

- Allegany State Park Route 3 (ASP Route 3) runs west to east from the southern terminus of ASP Route 2 near the Bradford entrance to New York State Route 280 at the park's Quaker Run entrance in Coldspring. ASP Route 3 to ASP Route 2 is the sole automobile road between Red House and Quaker Run during the winter.

There are also several paved secondary roads in Allegany State Park.

- Allegany State Park Route 2A (ASP Route 2A) runs along the southern shore of Red House Lake between ASP Route 1 and ASP Route 2.
- Quaker Lake Road runs from its intersection with ASP Route 3 (about 1-mile (1.6 km) east of the Quaker Entrance) around the North East side of Quaker Lake to just past the Quaker Beach.
- Cain Hollow Road goes from Quaker Lake Road (just north of ASP Route 3) into the Cain Hollow Campground.
- Friends Boat Launch Access Road is entered from outside the park, off NY 280, about 2 miles (3.2 km) north of the Quaker Entrance. This road leads to the boat launch onto the Allegheny Reservoir near the site of the old "Tunesassa School" (Indian School).

The park also has many minor access roads. These usually are dirt roads that go unmaintained during winter but otherwise range from good to rough condition.

- Bay State Road runs from ASP Route 1, about midpoint between Red House Lake and ASP3 past the former Big Basin Ski Area, north through the hamlet of Red House, and connects with ASP Route 2 just outside the park near I-86. Bay State Road cannot be navigated from end-to-end; it is only usable by snowmobile during the winter months and is gated off just south of Red House during the summer so as not to disturb the 38 remaining permanent residents of Red House. Bay State Road is maintained year-round by the town of Red House from the hamlet northward, as are two other roads in the hamlet, Lonkto Hollow Road and Beck Road.
- France Brook Road runs from ASP Route 2 near Group Camp 10, about 5 miles (8.0 km) south of Red House Lake, to ASP Route 1 near Bay State Road.
- Ridge Run Road starts at its intersection with ASP Route 2 (about 1-mile (1.6 km) north of the Bradford Entrance) and follows a ridge north to Thunder Rocks. Ridge Run Road is the main entrance to Thunder Rocks.
- Limestone Run Road goes from its intersection with ASP Route 2 (by France Brook Road) to the hamlet & former village of Limestone on the eastern side of Allegany. About midway this road intersects with Ridge Run Road (the entrance way to Thunder Rocks). Limestone Run Road serves as the eastern entrance to Allegany State Park from Limestone during the summer.
- Coon Run Road runs south from its intersection with ASP Route 3 (just east of the Quaker Inn) into the state of Pennsylvania and the Allegheny National Forest. The road is gated at the New York-Pennsylvania border during the summer.
- Wolf Run Road is entered outside the park from NY 280 (about 1 1/2 miles south of the Quaker Entrance). It follows a southerly course towards the state of Pennsylvania and the Allegheny National Forest, ending about one mile (1.6 km) northwest of the border. Wolf Run Road was originally built for the town of Elko, which by 1965 had been forcibly evacuated and assimilated into the park. Nothing of note is on Wolf Run Road.
- Holt Run Road is entered from NY 280 about 2 miles (3.2 km) north of the Quaker Entrance, across from the Friends Boat Launch.
- Bova Ski Hill Access Road diverges from ASP Route 2 at the fork in the road about 1/2 mile South of Red House Lake (by Camp Allegany) and runs east for about 1 mile (1.6 km) past the former Red House garbage dump to the old Bova Ski Area. Bova was a state-operated ski resort featuring alpine skiing and the region's only ski jumps; the resort, named after the Beauvais family who previously owned the property, operated from the 1930s to 1980.
- Stone Tower Access Road is a loop that runs from ASP Route 1 past the Art Rosco Ski Area (near Summit Cabins) (about 1.5 miles (2.4 km) south of the Salamanca Entrance) around Stone Tower and back to ASP Route 1 (about 4 miles (6.4 km) north of Red House Lake).
- The roads within the cabin trails (mentioned below), with the exception of the steep Ryan trail, are dirt roads maintained during the winter to allow access to the cabins.

== Administration building ==
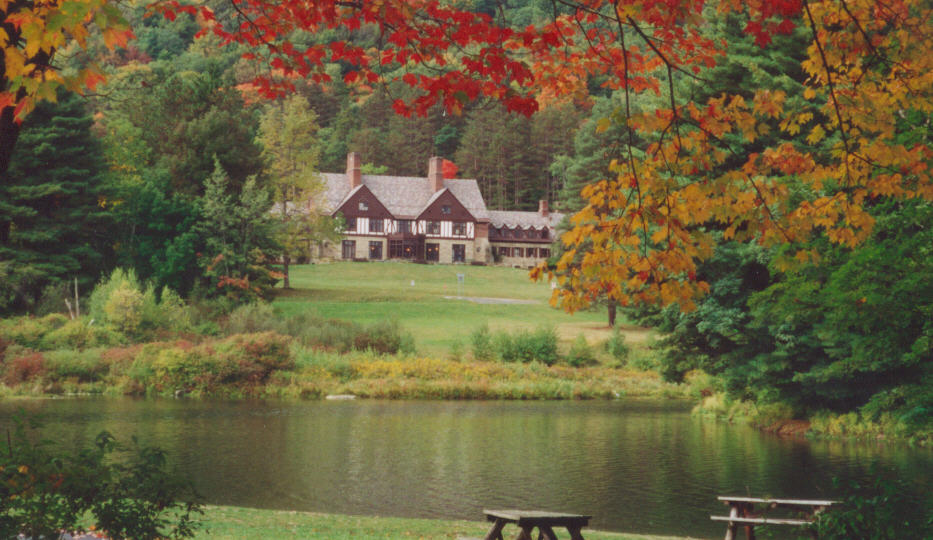
The Administration Building in Red House

Built in the Tudor Style during the depression era, this building has been extensively modernized, but still keeps its cozy rustic charm. It houses the Red House Rental Offices, the NYS Park Police Station, the park's natural history museum, the Red House Gift Shop, the Red House Restaurant and the Allegany Regional offices for the New York State Office of Parks, Recreation and Historic Preservation (NYSOPRHP).

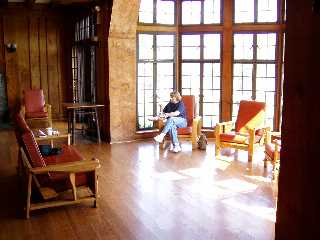
The bay window overlooking Red House Lake

The Administration Building also has a sitting room with a large bay window overlooking Red House Lake. This room is used for functions and meetings, and is equipped with two wood-burning fireplaces. The rental office, gift shop, museum, and Park Police Station are located on the main level of the building. The restaurant, Allegany Regional Offices of NYSOPRHP, and park offices are located on the upper level of the building. The basement includes offices and storage.

== Old Quaker Store Museum ==
Opened in 1996, the Old Quaker Store Museum features exhibits about the park's history, natural history and development. The museum is located in Salamanca, New York.

== Hiking trails ==
Allegany State Park offers 21 hiking trails of various lengths and difficulties available for use year round. Six of the trails are part of the Art Roscoe Ski Touring Area. The trails within this system are groomed for cross-country skiing during the winter months, and are unavailable for hiking. The Ridgerun trail, which is part of the system, features a lean-to. The Art Roscoe trails are located near Summit in the Red House Area. In addition to these trails, The Allegheny Highlands Snowmobile and Horse Trail begins in the park off ASP 2. Another unique bragging right the park has is that the famous North Country Trail passes through it. The North Country Trail is a 4000+ mile trail that spans through New York, Pennsylvania, Ohio, Michigan, Wisconsin, Minnesota, and terminates in North Dakota. Allegany State Park's 18-mile (29 km) section of the trail includes 4 lean-tos, two in the Quaker Area, and the other two in the Red House area. The Black Snake Mountain trail is also unique due to its direct contact with the Pennsylvania state line. One of the attractions on this trail is a concrete marker shows the exact line where New York and Pennsylvania meet. It is short enough that one could sit on the marker, and be in two states at once. Many other attractions are viewable on or from the trails listed below. In the Quaker Area, the Tornado Trail tours the damage area caused by an F-1 Tornado on August 28, 1990. Though much of the area has regrown, the path that was cut by the tornado is still visible; it was 1 of 4 to occur that day in Western New York. Here is a list of the hiking trails and their lengths. Each trail in the list is preceded by its longitude and latitude geographic coordinates (suitable to be used for a point of interest in various navigation devices):

=== Listing of hiking trails ===
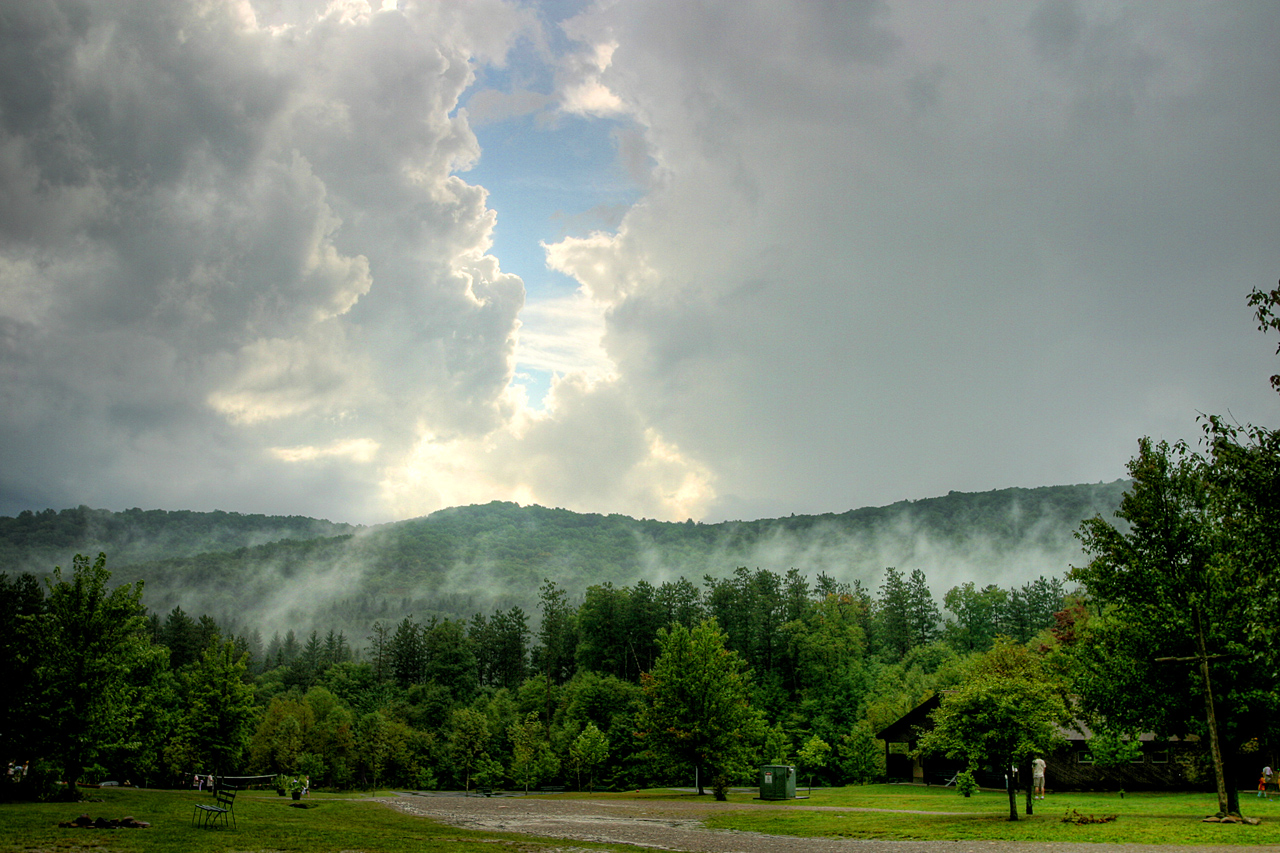
Mist on Mt. Tuscarora, viewed from Camp Turner (lon -78.844633 lat 42.021548) in 2007.

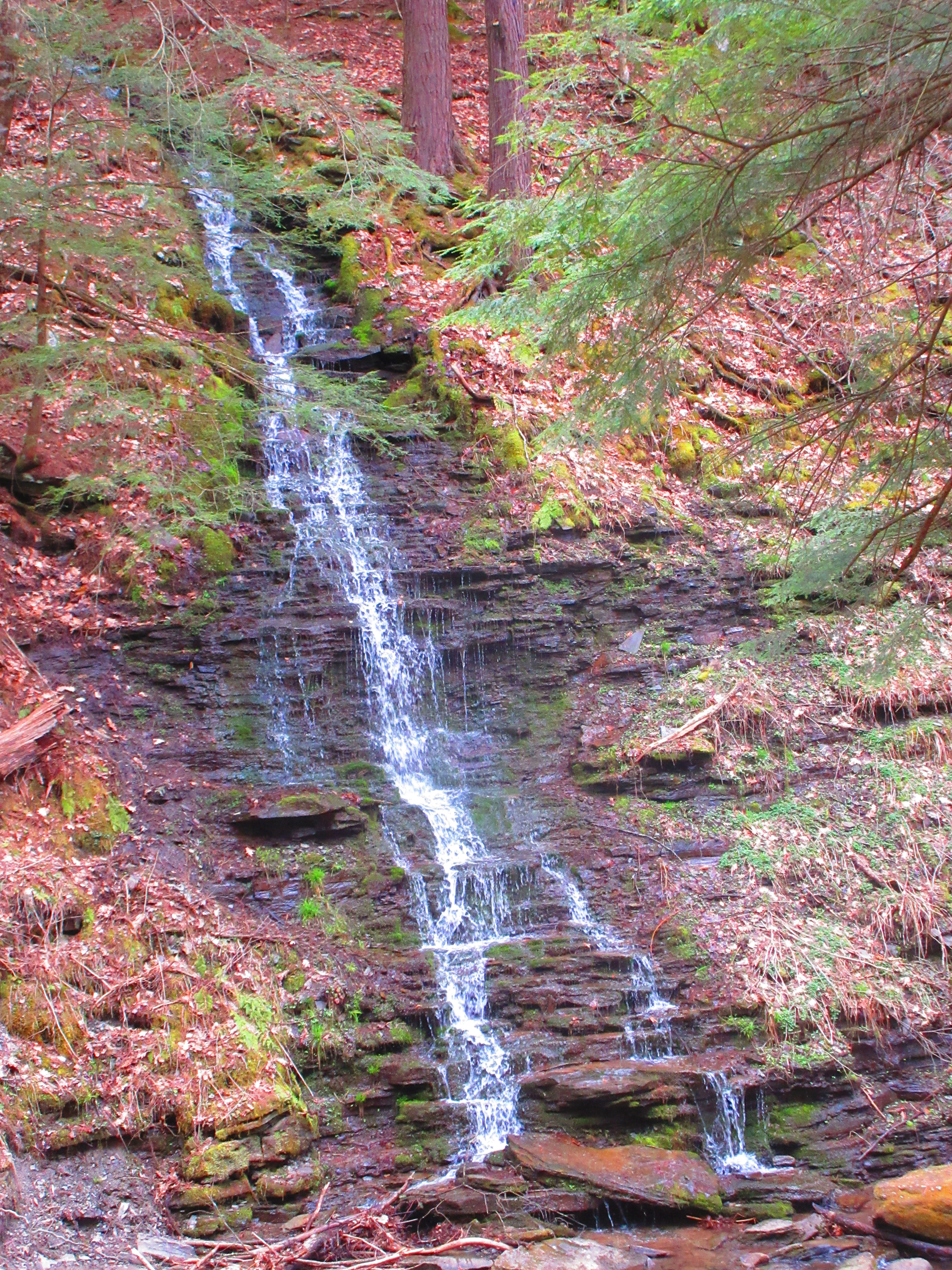
Bridal Falls on a cool spring day.

- -78.872167, 42.042833, Mt. Tuscarora trail - Fire Tower (5.3 miles)
- -78.800333, 42.009667, Bear Caves trail - Mt. Seneca (4.0 miles)
- -78.775000, 42.003167, Black Snake Mountain trail (3.0 miles)
- -78.827000, 42.013333, Three Sisters trail (2.5 miles)
- -78.799500, 42.033333, Bear Springs trail (0.5 miles)
- -78.744167, 42.096667, Beehunter trail (6.5 miles)
- -78.741667, 42.106667, Osgood trail (2.5 miles)
- -78.752000, 42.105000, Red Jacket trail (2.0 miles)
- -78.778000, 42.105000, North Country Trail (ASP section of the trail) (18.0 miles)
- -78.749333, 42.100000, Conservation Trail (4.0 miles)
- -78.704167, 42.125000, Patterson trail (3.5 miles)
- -78.691667, 42.120000, Ridgerun trail (5.0 miles)
- -78.690667, 42.120333, Leonard Run Loop (5.0 miles)
- -78.694167, 42.123833, Christian Hollow Loop (4.0 miles)
- -78.698333, 42.125000, Sweetwater trail (2.7 miles)
- -78.863333, 42.046667, Flagg trail (3.0 miles)
- -78.766667, 42.052833, Eastwood Meadows trail (2.5 miles)
- -78.704167, 42.125000, Snowsnake Run (4.9 miles)

In addition to the hiking trails, a paved bicycle path circumscribes Red House Lake. Along this path is the Thomas E. Kelly Bridge, the only covered bridge in Western New York.

== Program sites ==
In addition to the hiking trails, the park has set up 71 program sites which are used to direct park visitors to specific sites where the park naturalist staff conducts walks and other programs. The park publishes a Recreation Activities Bulletin which informs park visitors of the programs taking place in the published time period. The sites are numbered, with numbers corresponding to an attached map. When a program is conducted, park patrons are directed to meet at one of these specific places at the specified time. Examples of activities and their program site include a tour of a Beaver colony- Site 28, bike & hike to Bridal Falls- Site 60, tour of the Bear Caves- Site 42, tour of Thunder Rocks- Site 35, night owl walk- Site 32, etc.

== Cabin trails ==
Cabin Trails are clusters of cabins accessible by dirt roads (see above). Each trail usually has centrally located pit toilets or bathrooms with flush toilets, while shower facilities are more widely separated. All cabin trails in the Red House area have a dedicated shower house within the trail. The park rents 375 cabins on the trails listed below, 150 of them winterized. The cabin trails are:

=== Red House area cabin trails ===
- -78.748573, 42.097695, Anderson
- -78.748731, 42.109869, Sugarbush
- -78.742612, 42.106411, McIntosh
- -78.737509, 42.094601, Beehunter
- -78.723352, 42.096392, Congdon
- -78.714923, 42.084279, Ryan
- -78.704998, 42.125828, Summit
- -78.723310, 42.103470, Bova

==== Red House cabin area notes ====
Red House cabin styles: The Red House area of Allegany has, for the most part, newer cabins. Many of these cabins have more than one room, although some of the traditional one room, 16 by 16 feet (4.9 by 4.9 m) "Quaker Style" cabins still exist in the Red House area. These traditional one room cabins are: MacIntosh #'s 1, 3, 5, 20 (two rooms), 22, 26: Anderson #'s 2, 5, 6, 8 through 14 and 17: Beehunter #'s 6, 7, 31, 32 (two rooms), 33, 34.

There are some cabins that have one room plus a kitchenette in them. These are the cabins on Sugarbush and Congdon Trails. Newer three room cabins in the Red House area are located at: all of Summit Trail, Anderson Trail #'s 1, 1A, 7, 15, 16, all of MacIntosh Trail (except those mentioned above). All of Beehunter Trail (except for the #'s mentioned above) are even larger three room cottages. There are also older large four room cabins with fireplaces on Ryan Trail.

Electricity: The only cabins in the Red House area of the park that do not have electrical power or refrigerators are MacIntosh #'s 1, 3, 5, 20, 22, and 26.

Flush toilets and showers: All Cabin Trails in the Red House area have centrally located Flush toilets are also available in both the Red House and Beehunter Picnic Areas, the Red House Bathhouse, and the Red House Administration Building.

Winter rentals: All cabins in the Red House area are available year-round.

=== Quaker area cabin trails ===
- -78.842234, 42.020100, Weller
- -78.838036, 42.017306, Barton
- -78.830018, 42.011830, Ranger
- -78.828303, 42.011074, Pinetree
- -78.823084, 42.008992, Brow
- -78.823317, 42.015463, Ward
- -78.822524, 42.008965, Raccoon
- -78.823379, 42.011037, Diehl (also has tents and sites for trailers)
- -78.822295, 42.011202, Hamlin
- -78.817440, 42.010957, Bear Ridge Trail (three new cabins built in 2002)
- -78.815892, 42.011329, Horseshoe
- -78.815005, 42.011315, Reed
- -78.814186, 42.010855, Indian
- -78.814011, 42.011500, McCabe
- -78.812688, 42.011756, Angle (remodeled in 2003)
- -78.811019, 42.011471, Fancher Cottage Trail
- -78.809214, 42.011500, Buffalo
- -78.808566, 42.011290, Parallel
- -78.802848, 42.010129, Creekside
- -78.799062, 42.008980, Kaiser
- -78.834701, 42.014405, Taft
- -78.798044, 42.009154, Stony (special for horses with campers)

==== Quaker Area Cabin Notes ====
Quaker cabin styles: Although a few cabins in the Quaker area are the standard one room, 16 by 16 feet (4.9 by 4.9 m) "Quaker Style Cabin", there are lots cabins with two or more beehives available on this side of Allegany State Park. These cabins are: Weller #'s 13, 15, and 22: Pinetree #'s 1 through 4: Ranger #4: Ward #6: Brow #'s 3, 7 and 11: Gypsy #'s 6, 12,13, 16, and 19: Circle #2: Indian #5: McCabe #1 (four room): All Cottages (three rooms and a private bath); Parallel #'s 1 and 2 (full service cottages); Buffalo 13: Creekside #'s 9, 15, and 16: Kaiser #11 (three room) and 12 (four rooms). Taft cabin also has multiple rooms and screened-in porches that can be used as bedrooms.

Electricity: Most cabins in the Quaker area have electricity and include a refrigerator, however some do not. The cabins without electrical power, or refrigerators, in the Quaker area are Barton #'s 1 through 13 and #'s 19 through 22: Hamlin #'s 1 to 8 and #'s 11 and 14: Gypsy #'s 4 through 7 and 12 through 32 (Gypsy #11 has electricity, fridge, and gas heat/stove): Indian #'s 1 through 4: all cabins on Circle, Reed, and Creekside Trails. All other cabins in the Quaker area do have electricity and refrigerators.

Toilets: In the Quaker area, there are centrally located flush toilets on Weller, Diehl, Gypsy, and Buffalo Cabin Trails, as well as in the Fancher Bath House, the Quaker Museum, the Quaker Picnic Area, and the Quaker Rental Office. McCabe #1 also has a seasonal flush toilet inside.

Showers: Showers are available in the Fancher Bath House, as well as the bathhouses on Weller, and Diehl Cabin Trails.

Winter Rentals: Some cabins in the Quaker area are available to rent during the winter months. These cabins include Weller #'s 1 through 9: Diehl #'s 1 through 8: Gypsy #'s 1, 2, 3, 8 and 9: Angle #'s 1 through 11: Parallel #'s 1 and 2, and all of the Fancher Cottages.

Full Service Cottages: In addition to the standard cabins, the park rents 10 "full service" Cottages located in the Quaker Run Area. The seven Fancher Cottages are located in the southern part of the Allegany State park, adjacent to Quaker Run Creek and offer guests a unique camping experience. Named for Senator Albert T. Fancher, the "Father of Allegany State Park," each Fancher Cottage has a bathroom with shower, refrigerator, counter-top range and microwave. The fully handicapped accessible cottages sleep six, are furnished and stocked with pillows, bedding, cooking utensils, dishes and coffeemakers. In addition, each cottage has a grill and picnic table outside. Reminiscent of a classic hunting lodge, the Pitt Cottage in the Red House Area offers the same amenities as the Fancher Cottages. One outstanding feature of the Pitt Cottage is its gas burning stone fireplace. Located on Allegany State Park Rte. 2, the cottage is adjacent to Congdon Trail and three miles from the Administration Building. Pitt Cottage is not handicapped accessible. Recently rebuilt Parallel cabins 1 and 2 have the same amenities as the Fancher group of cottages and are handicapped accessible.

== Tent and trailer areas ==
In addition to cabin rentals, the park operates and maintains 3 tent and trailer campgrounds.

In the Red House Area there is the Red House Tent and Trailer Area; Quaker Area has the Diehl Tent and Trailer Trailer Area, and the Cain Hollow Camping Area. Between the three, 424 sites are available for tent or trailer use.

The Red House Tent and Trailer Area is situated along Stoddard Creek. Its entrance is on ASP1, across from the Redhouse General Store. This campground contains 5 loops; Loops A, B, C & D, and E. Loop A and a few sites on the remaining 4 loops are non electric sites. All of the loops are interconnected by dirt roads.

The Cain Hollow Camping Area is located in Cain Hollow, off Quaker Lake Road, about 1-mile (1.6 km) east of Quaker Entrance to Allegany State Park on ASP 3. This campground has 4 loops; Loops A, B, C, and D. Many sites are equipped with an electrical hookup, and have central bathrooms. Water Taps are located throughout the campground and on the Bathhouses. Cain Hollow loop A is entirely out in the open, and separate from the other 3 Loops, it is set up more for Trailers than Tenting. Loops B, C, and D are mostly Tree'd lots. Cain Hollow was recently renovated and all the bathhouses are new, with three automatic flush toilets and two showers in each, one of which in each is accessible to people with mobility issues. There is a Trailer Dumping station on the main road near Site 55. All Roads are paved, with partial paved/gravel driveways for campsites. All sites are 'back-in' sites, there are no 'pull-thru' sites. Cain Hollow Campground is only open during summer months, from mid-May until mid-October.

Diehl Tent and Trailer Trail sits beside English Creek, running parallel with ASP1 just east of the Quaker Inn. This camping trail also has 8 cabins on it, and is a single loop with 22 non-electric sites and a bath and shower house at the trail head.

Gift Cards can also be purchased for camping purposes. Gift cards can be purchased and redeemed at most New York State Parks.

== Reserving campsites and cabins ==
All sites and cabins can be reserved either in-person at the park or through ReserveAmerica.com.

== Group camps ==
The park also has several larger campsites known as Group Camps. These are reserved primarily by large groups or organizations such as Boy Scout troops, church groups, etc. They usually consist of several cabins or dormitories, a kitchen with dining hall, bathroom and shower facilities, and, in some of the larger group camps, classrooms or gathering halls. The largest group camp in Allegany State Park is Camp Allegany. While it is not operated by the park itself, park maintenance crews still are responsible for its upkeep. Camp Turner also is a group camp that is not operated by the park. Camp Turner, established in 1923, is used as a co-ed children's summer camp and was operated by the youth department of the Roman Catholic Diocese of Buffalo until 2020. It is now operated by OLV Catholic Charities. Over the years the group camps have been falling apart, until recently. The park is going through a revitalization period. They have recently bulldozed Group Camp 5, and plan to rebuild for next spring. Camp 10 (Carlton) also has work being done on the cabins, as they were falling down. Otherwise, the park rents and maintains the other group camps.

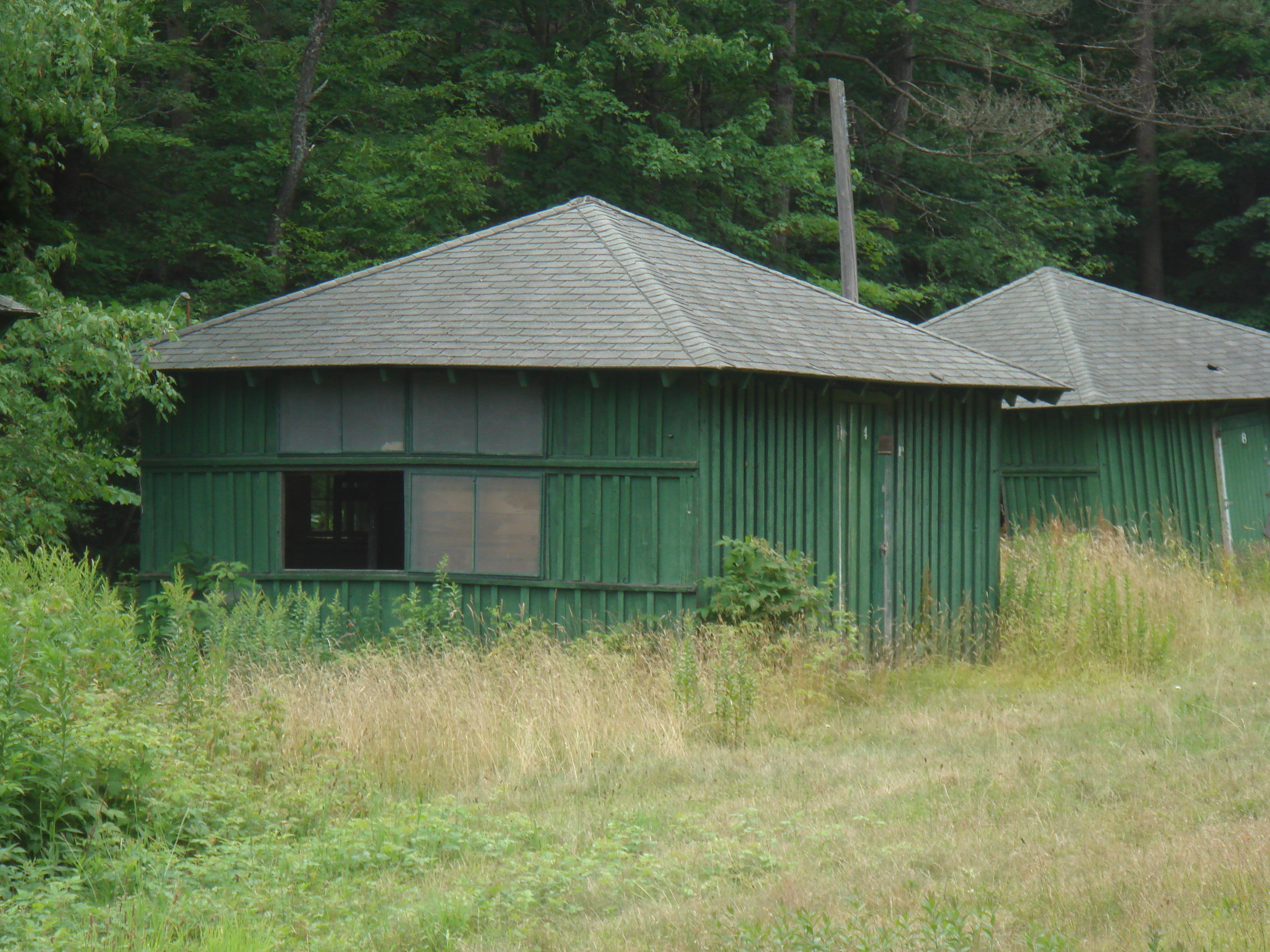
A cabin in Camp 10 (Carlton) in 2007. The camp is under construction with new cabins being built.

== Beaches ==
There are two small bathing beaches in the park: one at Red House Lake and another at Quaker Lake at the end of Quaker Lake Road, past the entrance to Cain Hollow Campground. The swimming areas are staffed by lifeguards, and only open to swimmers from 11am-7pm while lifeguards are present. Both beaches have a Diving Platform, also staffed by lifeguards with 12 ft (3.7 m) deep water. There are very strict rules in the beach waters, no flotation devices are allowed unless Coastguard Approved. Air mattresses, Tubes, and even Kiddie Water-wings are prohibited. The beaches are often closed due to thunderstorms or other possibly dangerous situations. Both beaches have bathrooms near the parking lot; the 1960s-vintage restrooms near Quaker Lake were torn down after summer 2015, with a newly constructed pavilion to open in 2016. A snack bar is also present at both Red House Lake and Quaker Lake.

== Maps ==
A new Allegany State Park map & brochure was produced in 2010 by Allegany State Park and Cattaraugus County. With Allegany State Park personnel, the Cattaraugus County Department of Real Property created a new map and the Department of Economic Development, Planning and Tourism worked on a new brochure.

=== ASP Routing System ===
There are three routes connecting through the State Park. In the Red House and Quaker Run Areas, the speed limit is 25 MPH (40 km/h), while the limit is 35 MPH (55 km/h) in forested parts.

Name	Mi	From	To	Notes
ASP 1	14.4	951M in the Salamanca City Line	ASP 3 at the Quaker Run Area	
ASP 2	10.3	I-86/NY17 (Exit 19) in Red House	ASP 3 near Bradford, PA	
ASP 3	12	NY280 in Cold Spring	Pennsylvania State Line (Interstate Parkway)	

== Climate ==
According to the Köppen Climate Classification system, Allegany State Park has a warm-summer humid continental climate, abbreviated "Dfb" on climate maps. The hottest temperature recorded in Allegany State Park was 101 °F (38.3 °C) on July 9, 1936, while the coldest temperature recorded was −35 °F (−37.2 °C) on February 9, 1934.

Climate data for Allegany State Park, New York, 1991–2020 normals, extremes 1924–present
Month	Jan	Feb	Mar	Apr	May	Jun	Jul	Aug	Sep	Oct	Nov	Dec	Year
Record high °F (°C)	72 (22)	72 (22)	82 (28)	89 (32)	90 (32)	94 (34)	101 (38)	97 (36)	97 (36)	90 (32)	81 (27)	70 (21)	101 (38)
Mean maximum °F (°C)	53.7 (12.1)	53.7 (12.1)	65.3 (18.5)	78.3 (25.7)	84.4 (29.1)	86.6 (30.3)	87.2 (30.7)	85.8 (29.9)	83.2 (28.4)	75.4 (24.1)	66.6 (19.2)	55.9 (13.3)	89.1 (31.7)
Mean daily maximum °F (°C)	31.2 (−0.4)	33.3 (0.7)	41.9 (5.5)	55.6 (13.1)	67.6 (19.8)	75.3 (24.1)	78.7 (25.9)	77.0 (25.0)	70.4 (21.3)	58.6 (14.8)	46.4 (8.0)	35.8 (2.1)	56.0 (13.3)
Daily mean °F (°C)	23.3 (−4.8)	24.4 (−4.2)	31.8 (−0.1)	43.9 (6.6)	55.3 (12.9)	63.7 (17.6)	67.4 (19.7)	66.1 (18.9)	59.5 (15.3)	48.5 (9.2)	38.3 (3.5)	29.0 (−1.7)	45.9 (7.7)
Mean daily minimum °F (°C)	15.3 (−9.3)	15.4 (−9.2)	21.7 (−5.7)	32.2 (0.1)	43.0 (6.1)	52.1 (11.2)	56.2 (13.4)	55.1 (12.8)	48.7 (9.3)	38.4 (3.6)	30.1 (−1.1)	22.2 (−5.4)	35.9 (2.2)
Mean minimum °F (°C)	−7.1 (−21.7)	−5.0 (−20.6)	0.0 (−17.8)	19.7 (−6.8)	28.5 (−1.9)	36.8 (2.7)	45.0 (7.2)	43.7 (6.5)	35.0 (1.7)	25.4 (−3.7)	15.1 (−9.4)	5.0 (−15.0)	−10.3 (−23.5)
Record low °F (°C)	−27 (−33)	−35 (−37)	−18 (−28)	7 (−14)	18 (−8)	24 (−4)	25 (−4)	28 (−2)	20 (−7)	12 (−11)	−4 (−20)	−22 (−30)	−35 (−37)
Average precipitation inches (mm)	3.46 (88)	2.37 (60)	2.88 (73)	3.99 (101)	4.03 (102)	4.61 (117)	5.10 (130)	4.31 (109)	4.19 (106)	4.27 (108)	3.76 (96)	3.67 (93)	46.64 (1,183)
Average snowfall inches (cm)	21.0 (53)	18.2 (46)	12.7 (32)	2.8 (7.1)	0.0 (0.0)	0.0 (0.0)	0.0 (0.0)	0.0 (0.0)	0.0 (0.0)	0.2 (0.51)	7.4 (19)	20.8 (53)	83.1 (210.61)
Average precipitation days (≥ 0.01 in)	17.5	14.0	12.4	13.3	12.8	11.9	11.7	11.2	10.9	13.7	13.3	16.1	158.8
Average snowy days (≥ 0.1 in)	10.2	8.3	4.8	1.4	0.0	0.0	0.0	0.0	0.0	0.1	3.0	7.5	35.3
Source 1: NOAA
Source 2: National Weather Service

== Bibliography ==
- Congdon, Charles E. (1967). Allegany Oxbow: A History of Allegany State Park and the Allegany Reserve of the Seneca Nation. Little Valley, N.Y.: Straight Publishing Co.
- Commissioners of the Allegany State Park (1922). First Annual Report of the Commissioners of the Allegany State Park to the Legislature of the State of New York From June 1, 1921 to December 31, 1921 (Report). Albany, N.Y.: J.B. Lyon Company, Printers. hdl:2027/mdp.39015068143398.
