= Carrollton, New York =

- Town
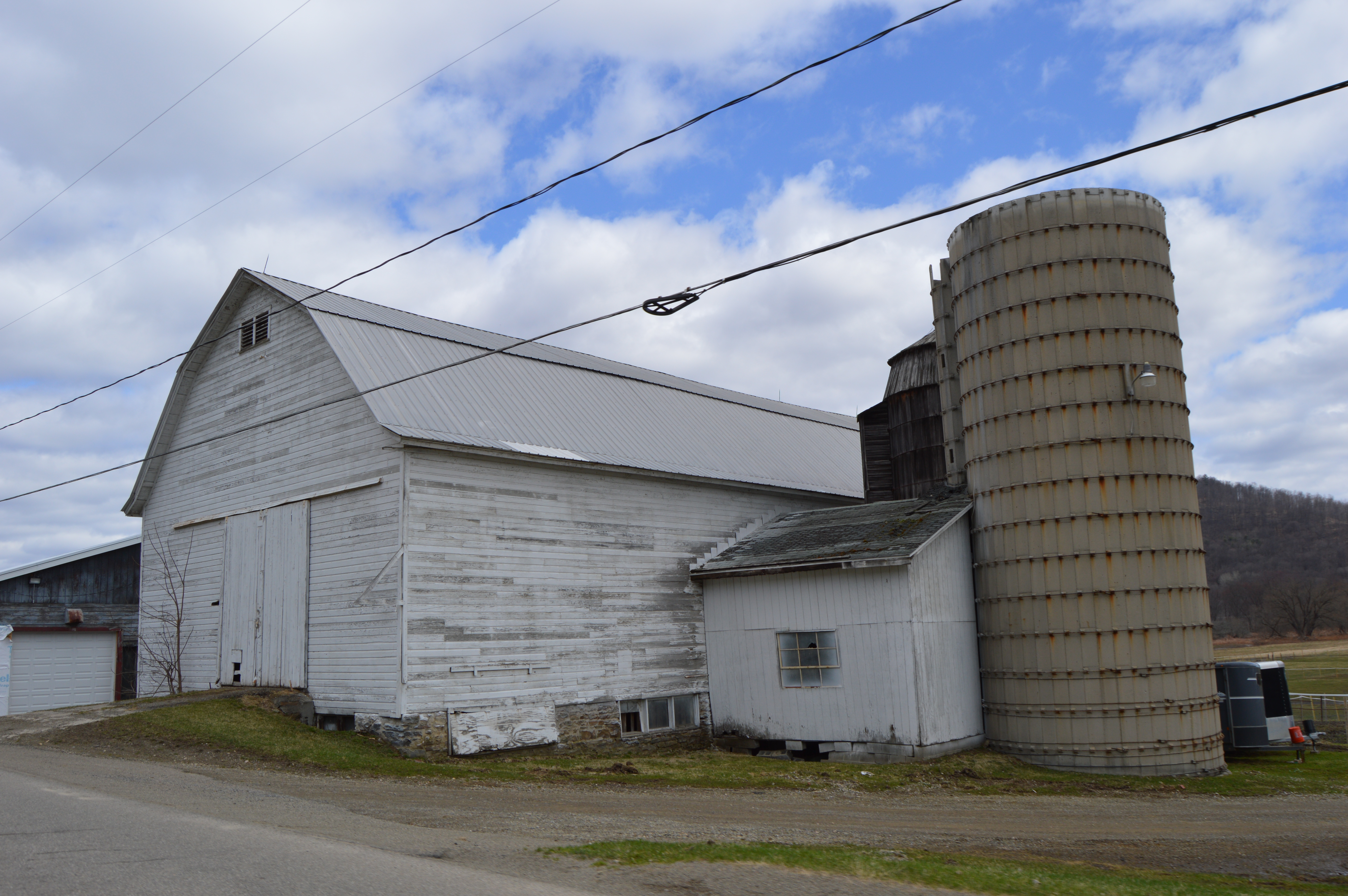
- A farm on Parkside Drive, south of Limestone

- Location within New York Location within the United States
- Coordinates: 42°6.5′N 78°39.1′W
- Country: United States
- State: New York
- County: Cattaraugus

Government
  - Type: Town Council
  - Town Supervisor: Bruce Hudson (R)
  - Town Council: Members' List: • James Stoddard (R); • Brian Jacoby (R); • James Rounsville (R); • Ralph J. Bottone (D, R)

Area
  - Total: 42.33 sq mi (109.63 km^{2})
  - Land: 42.29 sq mi (109.52 km^{2})
  - Water: 0.042 sq mi (0.11 km^{2})
- Elevation: 1,391 ft (424 m)

Population (2020)
  - Total: 1,214 ▼
  - Estimate (2021): 1,208
  - Density: 29.2/sq mi (11.27/km^{2})
- Time zone: UTC-5 (Eastern (EST))
  - Summer (DST): UTC-4 (EDT)
- ZIP Codes: 14753 (Limestone); 14706 (Allegany); 14748 (Kill Buck); 14779 (Salamanca)
- FIPS code: 36-009-12661
- GNIS feature ID: 0978797
- Website: www.carrolltonny.gov

Carrollton is a town in Cattaraugus County, New York, United States. The population was 1,214 at the 2020 census. The town was named after Guy Carrollton Irvine, an early settler of the region.

Carrollton is on the south border of Cattaraugus County. It is southeast of the city of Salamanca.

== History ==
The town was first settled circa 1822. The Town of Carrollton was formed on March 9, 1842, from the town of Great Valley.

In 1877, the community of Limestone set itself off from the town by incorporating as a village. In 2011, this community reverted to being a hamlet within the town because voters agreed to dissolve the village in 2009.

== Geography ==
According to the United States Census Bureau, the town has a total area of 42.34 square miles (109.66 km^{2}), of which 42.30 square miles (109.55 km^{2}) is land and 0.04 square miles (0.11 km^{2}), or 0.14%, is water.

The Allegheny River flows through the northern portion of the town, from southeast to northwest. Tunungwant Creek (also known as "Tuna Creek" for short) flows south to north through the middle of the town, joining with the Allegheny near Riverside Junction. Mount Irvine rises in the northwest part of the town. The south town line is the border of McKean County, Pennsylvania.

The Southern Tier Expressway (combined Interstate 86 and New York State Route 17) crosses the north part of the town, and U.S. Route 219 passes north–south through the town, joining New York State Route 417 north of the Allegheny River.

=== Adjacent towns and areas ===
(Clockwise)

- Great Valley
- Allegany
- Foster Township, McKean County, Pennsylvania
- Red House

== Demographics ==
Historical population
Census	Pop.	Note	%±
1850	515		—
1860	779		51.3%
1870	1,142		46.6%
1880	2,171		90.1%
1890	1,884		−13.2%
1900	1,385		−26.5%
1910	1,179		−14.9%
1920	1,013		−14.1%
1930	1,026		1.3%
1940	1,235		20.4%
1950	1,332		7.9%
1960	1,399		5.0%
1970	1,507		7.7%
1980	1,566		3.9%
1990	1,555		−0.7%
2000	1,410		−9.3%
2010	1,297		−8.0%
2020	1,214		−6.4%
2021 (est.)	1,208		−0.5%
U.S. Decennial Census

As of the census of 2000, there were 1,410 people, 553 households, and 383 families residing in the town. The population density was 33.3 inhabitants per square mile (12.9/km^{2}). There were 639 housing units at an average density of 15.1 per square mile (5.8/km^{2}). The racial makeup of the town was 94.82% White, 1.56% African American, 1.56% Native American, 0.14% Asian, 0.28% from other races, and 1.63% from two or more races. Hispanic or Latino of any race were 1.28% of the population.

There were 553 households, out of which 31.1% had children under the age of 18 living with them, 56.6% were married couples living together, 9.9% had a female householder with no husband present, and 30.6% were non-families. 24.8% of all households were made up of individuals, and 10.7% had someone living alone who was 65 years of age or older. The average household size was 2.51 and the average family size was 2.95.

In the town, the population was spread out, with 26.0% under the age of 18, 7.8% from 18 to 24, 27.5% from 25 to 44, 25.7% from 45 to 64, and 13.0% who were 65 years of age or older. The median age was 39 years. For every 100 females there were 103.2 males. For every 100 females age 18 and over, there were 93.7 males.

The median income for a household in the town was $31,290, and the median income for a family was $40,313. Males had a median income of $28,854 versus $19,861 for females. The per capita income for the town was $14,678. About 9.9% of families and 14.4% of the population were below the poverty line, including 17.9% of those under age 18 and 12.0% of those age 65 or over.

== Notable person ==
- Frederic Palen Schoonmaker, former US federal judge, born in Limestone

== Communities and locations in the Town of Carrollton ==
- Allegany Reservation – A reservation of the Iroquois is partially in the northern section of the town.
- Allegany State Park – A part of this park in the western section of the town.
- Carrollton – The hamlet of Carrollton, formerly a station on the Erie Railroad is in the northwest part of the town on a side road, off Routes 219 and 417. The community developed at the junction of two rail lines. The hamlet consists almost entirely of residences (and one deconsecrated church) and has no businesses except one cannabis dispensary.
- Irvine Mills – A hamlet south of Seneca Junction and north of Limestone on US Route 219.
- Limestone – The former village of Limestone, now a census-designated place, is in the south part of the town on US Route 219.
- Mount Irvine – A small mountain peak, elevation 2,324 feet (708 m), west of Irvine Mills.
- New Ireland – A ghost town located west of Limestone. Now surrounded by Allegany State Park, it was settled by Irish immigrants during the Great Famine of the 1840s and abandoned during the Great Depression when its founders' descendants became involved in the petroleum industry and moved west.
- Riverside Junction – A hamlet west of Route 219 by the Allegheny River.
- Seneca Junction (sometimes "Allegany Junction" or "Bradford Junction") – A hamlet at the junction of Routes 219 and 417, near Interstate 86 exit 23.
- South Carrollton – A hamlet on Routes 219 and 417 south of Carrollton.
- South Vandalia – A hamlet near the east town line on County Road 30.
- Tuna – A former community in the town.
- Vandalia – A hamlet on the east town line on Route 417. The eastern gateway to the Allegany Reservation, the hamlet has many native businesses selling gasoline, cannabis and cigarettes.
