= Cornplanter Tract =

Seneca tribal land in Pennsylvania

Coordinates: 41.946°N 78.936°W

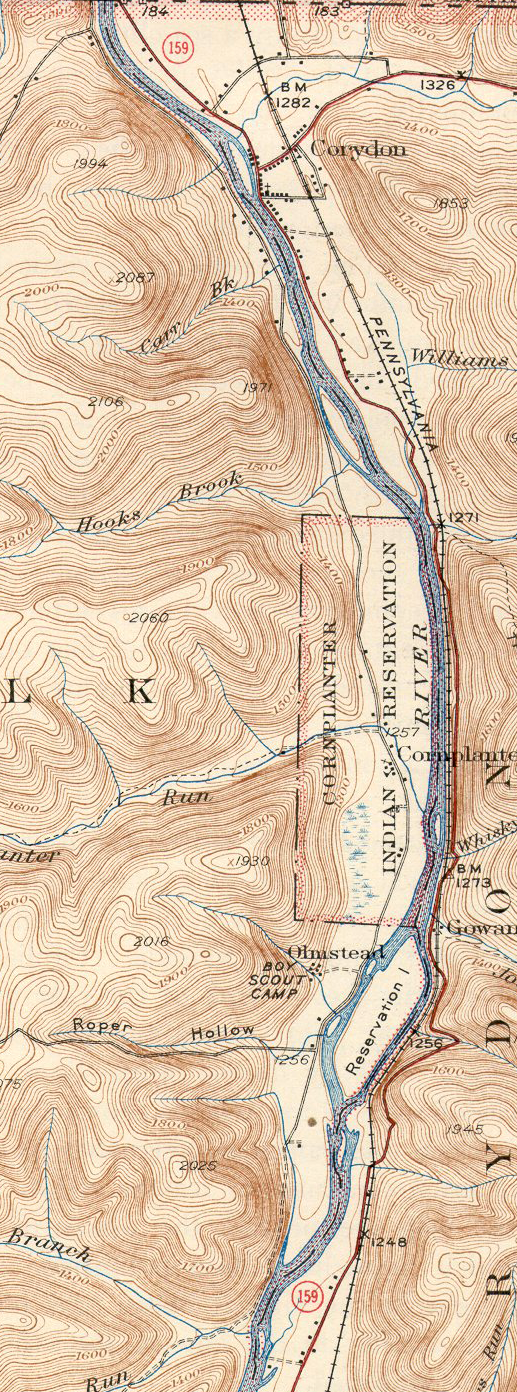
The Cornplanter Tract in 1941

The Cornplanter Tract or Cornplanter Indian Reservation (Seneca: Jonöhsade꞉gëh) is a plot of land in Warren County, Pennsylvania that was administered by the Seneca tribe. The tract consisted of 1,500 acres (610 ha) along the Allegheny River.

The tract comprised the only native reserved lands within the state of Pennsylvania during its existence. It was originally established in 1796 as a grant to Seneca diplomat Cornplanter, also known as John Abeel III, for his personal use, with the right to pass the plot down through his descendants forever. Cornplanter promptly opened up his plot to native settlement, and within two years, 400 Seneca were living on the tract. Internally, the Seneca Nation called the tract the Burned Building, or "Jonöhsade꞉gëh" in the Seneca language.

The tract was never connected to the electric power grid, and buildings there had to rely upon kerosene, coal and oil, which had to be used in furnaces specially built several feet above ground level, since even before the dam was built, the tract was prone to frequent flooding and roads to and from the tract were often unreliable. The tract's one-room school closed in 1953, as only one elementary school-aged child remained on the tract; it had employed the same live-in teacher, Lucia Browne, since 1929.

In the early 1960s, construction of the Kinzua Dam created the Allegheny Reservoir, which submerged the vast majority of the tract. Graves located in a cemetery on the tract mostly were exhumed and their bodies were reinterred in higher ground.

Cornplanter descendants meet annually to Remember the Removal. There are hundreds of descendants of Cornplanter. They meet annually at the Annual Cornplanter Reunion Picnic. In 2018, the Cornplanter newsletters were compiled and published. These include genealogical information and stories from Cornplanter descendants.
