= Carrie B. Raymond =

American musician and educator (1857–1927)

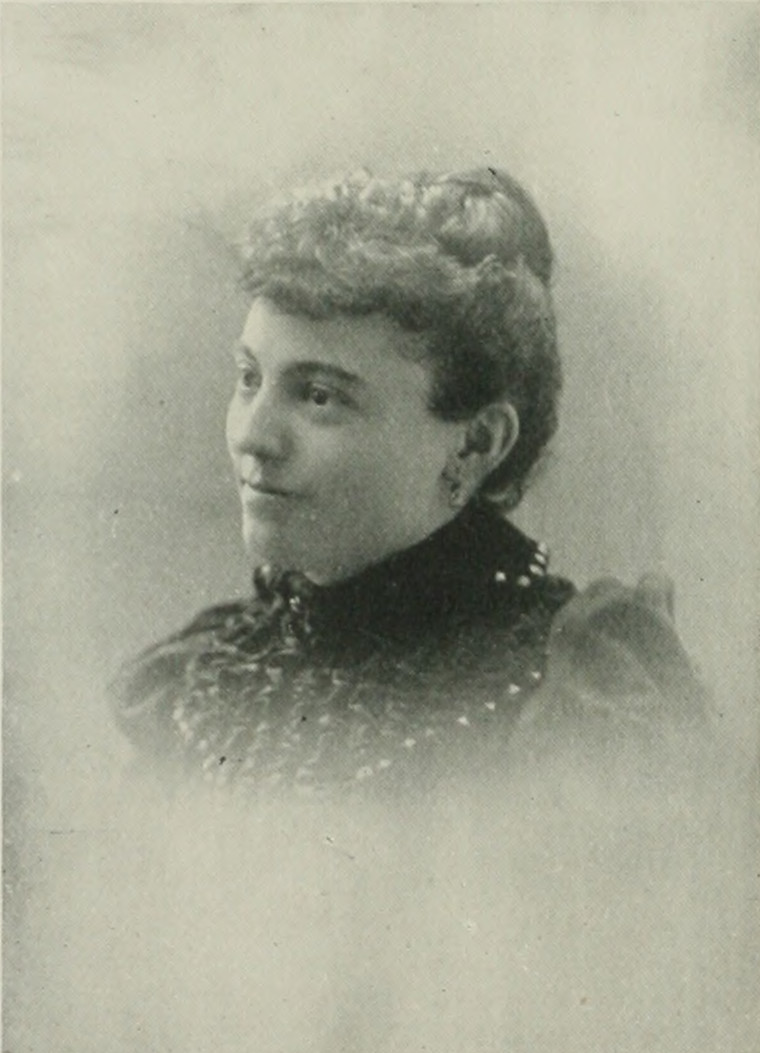
- Portrait photo from A Woman of the Century
- Born: Carrie Isabelle Rice; July 12, 1857; South Valley, New York, U.S.
- Died: October 3, 1927 (aged 70); Lincoln, Nebraska, U.S.
- Other names: Carrie Belle Raymond
- Occupations: musician; educator
- Known for: Choral director, University of Nebraska–Lincoln

Carrie B. Raymond (née, Rice; 1857–1927) was an American musician and educator. For 34 years, she directed the University of Nebraska–Lincoln chorus.

== Early life and education ==
Carrie Isabelle Rice was born in South Valley, New York, July 12, 1857. Her parents removed to Iowa when she was young.

Her love of music displayed itself very early in life, and she was happy in practicing her music. At the age of 10, she was sufficiently far advanced to play the cabinet organ in church, having had the benefit of such instruction as the small town afforded. At the age of 14, she began to play on the pipe-organ. Her progress and the real talent she displayed warranted the desire for better instruction than the region then afforded. She went to Brooklyn, New York, and placed herself under the instruction of Professor Lasar. While with him, she paid particular attention to the piano and organ.

== Career ==
She began her career in Washington, D.C. as a teacher and organist, in both of which she was successful. Very few women of the time could manipulate an organ with the ease and skill demonstrated by Raymond.

In 1877, she married Peter Voorhis Miller Raymond (1847–1910).

In 1885, they settled in Lincoln, Nebraska. Soon after that, she brought together a small company of musicians for the purpose of doing chorus work. Though she encountered many obstacles, by perseverance and ability as a musical director, she overcame them. At length, her chorus was considered one of the best drilled in the Western states.

In 1887, she organized an annual musical festival, during which some of the great masterpieces were to be performed. Among those given were Handel's Messiah and Judas Maccabaeus, Haydn's The Creation and Spring, Mendelssohn's Elijah and Lobgesang, Spohr's Last Judgment, Gaul's Holy City, Gounod's Messe solennelle, and Gade's Crusaders. She was in the habit of drilling and preparing the chorus for the festivals and then handing over the baton to an imported director, but in May 1891, the members of the chorus prevailed upon her to conduct the music in the festival. The works given on that occasion were Haydn's Creation, with full chorus and orchestra, and Gade's Crusaders. The performance was a success. That was undoubtedly the first instance in the history of music where a woman filled that position in the rendition of an oratorio.

In the December following, she conducted Mendelssohn's Lobgesang with marked success. In May 1892, the Messiah, Cowen's Sleeping Beauty and a miscellaneous concert were given. The work of the orchestra in those concerts was especially commented upon. An attractive feature of the miscellaneous programmes was a chorus of 150 women, which was under the complete control of Raymond. In July 1892, she was director of music in the Crete, Nebraska, Chautauqua Assembly, during which a number of successful concerts were given.

In 1894, she became Instructor in Sight Reading University Chorus Classes at University of Nebraska–Lincoln. Till her death in 1927, she directed the university's choruses, staging oratorios, bringing artists to Lincoln, and taking part in the city's musical life. the university commencement programs and countless number of music festivals were under her active leadership. Some of the leading symphony orchestras of the U.S., brought to Lincoln for these events, played under Raymond's baton. She prepared a number of musical programs for the Nebraska State Teachers Association

== Awards and honors ==
- 1924, Kiwanis Medal in Recognition of Distinguished Service
- 1931, Carillon Tower, First Plymouth Congregational Church, dedicated to Raymond
- 1932, Raymond Hall, University of Nebraska

== Death ==
Carrie B. Raymond died of heart disease at Lincoln, Nebraska, October 3, 1927.
