= Mount Tuscarora =

Mountain in New York, United States

- Location within New York Adirondack Park Location within the United States

Highest point
- Elevation: 2,142 feet (653 m)
- Coordinates: 42°01′18″N 78°51′38″W

Geography
- Location: Coldspring, Cattaraugus County, New York, U.S.
- Topo map: USGS Red House

Mount Tuscarora is a mountain in the Southern Tier of New York. It is in Allegany State Park in Coldspring, Cattaraugus County. In 1928, a 60-foot-tall (18 m) steel fire lookout tower was built on the mountain. The tower remains on the mountain but needs to be restored. The peak is the tallest in the Allegany State Park among those that have a trail to the summit, at 2,144 ft above sea level.

== History ==
From 1890 to 1965, Mount Tuscarora was known as South Hill and was within the jurisdiction of the town of Elko. The mountain divided the two settlements in its bounds, with Quaker Bridge (Tunesassa) to the north and Wolf Run to the southwest.

In 1928, the Conservation Department's Division of State Parks built a 60-foot-tall (18 m) Aermotor LS40 steel fire lookout tower on the mountain. By the end of 1928, the park had five towers in operation including the three main towers on Mount Irvine, Mount Tuscarora, and Summit, as well as two more on Red House and Bova Mountain. In 1931, the jurisdiction of many State Park towers was transferred to Forest Fire Control. However, the Alleghany State Park retained jurisdiction and staffed the tower on Mount Tuscarora during times of high fire danger. The lookout tower remains on the mountain, but is in serious need of adoption and restoration.
