= Allegheny Reservoir =

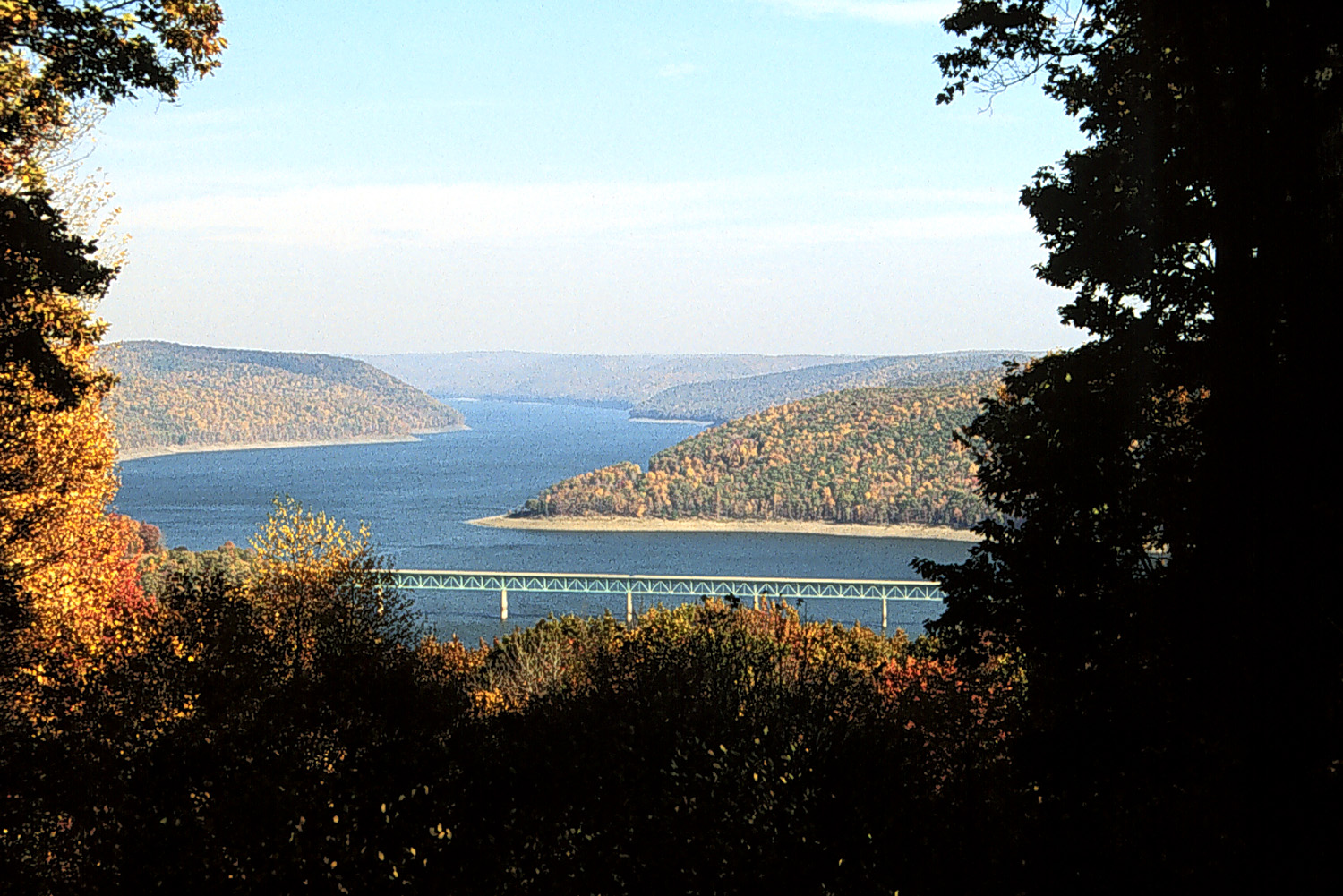
- State Route 59 crossing the reservoir in Warren County, Pennsylvania

- Location within Pennsylvania Location within the United States
- Location: Pennsylvania and New York
- Coordinates: 41°50′16″N 79°00′14″W
- Type: Reservoir
- Basin countries: United States
- Max. length: 24 mi (39 km)
- Surface area: 12,000 acres (49 km^{2})

The Allegheny Reservoir (also known as Kinzua Lake and unofficially as Lake Perfidy) is a reservoir along the Allegheny River in Pennsylvania and New York, USA. It was created in 1965 by the construction of the Kinzua Dam along the river. Lake Perfidy comes from Peter La Farge's ballad "As Long as the Grass Shall Grow," recorded by Johnny Cash on his album Bitter Tears: Ballads of the American Indian, which alleged that the reservoir's existence violates the 1794 agreement between Seneca chief Cornplanter and George Washington.

== History ==
The Allegheny Reservoir is a man-made lake created along the Allegheny River with the construction of the Kinzua Dam in 1965. The dam was authorized by the United States Congress as a flood control measure in the Flood Control Acts of 1936 and 1938, and was built by the U. S. Army Corps of Engineers beginning in 1960. Other benefits from the dam include drought control, hydroelectric power production, and recreation. The lake and the dam are operated by the U.S. Army Corps of Engineers. The construction of the lake and dam cost $108 million and (along with the concurrent construction of the Southern Tier Expressway) destroyed the hamlets of Kinzua, Sugar Run, Cornplanter (Indian Reservation) and Corydon in Pennsylvania, and the hamlets of Onoville, Quaker Bridge, Cold Spring and Red House in New York, led to the dissolution of the Pennsylvania townships of Kinzua and West Corydon, and the New York town of Elko, and flooded some of the lands of the Seneca Nation. The residents in these areas were forced to move. The area is unique because very little private development exists along the reservoir.

== Geography ==
The Allegheny Reservoir is surrounded by the Allegheny National Forest in Pennsylvania and Allegheny State Park and the Seneca Nation's Allegany Reservation in New York. The man-made lake is about 198 miles (319 km) above the mouth of the river in Pittsburgh, Pennsylvania and located within Warren and McKean counties in Pennsylvania and Cattaraugus County and the Allegany Reservation in New York. The reservoir is 24 miles (39 km) long and at full pool, it covers 33.09 square miles, or 21,180 acres (85.7 km^{2}). The undammed end of the reservoir reaches near the city of Salamanca. Much of Allegheny National Recreation Area surrounds the reservoir.
