= Mount Irvine (New York) =

Mountain in New York, United States

- Location within New York Adirondack Park Location within the United States

Highest point
- Elevation: 2,323 feet (708 m)
- Coordinates: 42°03′46″N 78°40′03″W

Geography
- Location: NW of Limestone, Cattaraugus County, New York, U.S.
- Topo map: USGS Limestone

Mount Irvine is a mountain in the Southern Tier of New York. It is located in Carrollton, northwest of Limestone in Cattaraugus County. In 1928, a 60-foot-tall (18 m) steel fire lookout tower was built on the mountain. Three years later, the tower was moved to Science Hill.

== History ==
In 1928, the Conservation Department's Division of State Parks built a 60-foot-tall (18 m) Aermotor LS40 steel fire lookout tower on the mountain in Alleghany State Park. By the end of 1928, the park had five towers in operation including the three main towers on Mount Irvine, Mount Tuscarora and Summit, as well as two more on Red House and Bova Mountain. In 1931, the jurisdiction of many State Park towers was transferred to Forest Fire Control. However, the Alleghany State Park retained jurisdiction and staffed the tower on Mount Irvine during times of high fire danger. In 1931, the park moved the tower to Science Hill, near the Pennsylvania border. It remained on Science Hill until 1978, when it was taken down and reassembled at the Ellicottville BOCES school.
