= Red House, New York =

Red House, New York Jóë́’hesta’
- Town
- Location within New York Location within the United States
- Coordinates: 42°2′25″N 78°48′19″W
- Country: United States
- State: New York
- County: Cattaraugus

Government
  - Type: Town Council
  - Town Supervisor: Tamara A. Booth (D, R)
  - Town Council: Members' List: • Brian R. Booth (R); • Lindsay K. Brown (R); • Melissa Sipko (D); • Veronica A. Weber (R)

Area
  - Total: 55.86 sq mi (144.68 km^{2})
  - Land: 55.67 sq mi (144.19 km^{2})
  - Water: 0.19 sq mi (0.49 km^{2})
- Elevation: 2,215 ft (675 m)

Population (2020)
  - Total: 30
  - Estimate (2021): 30
  - Density: 0.62/sq mi (0.24/km^{2})
- Time zone: UTC-5 (Eastern (EST))
  - Summer (DST): UTC-4 (EDT)
- ZIP Codes: 14773 (discontinued); 14779 (Salamaca)
- FIPS code: 36-009-60950
- GNIS feature ID: 0979412
- Website: redhouseny.org

Red House (Seneca: Jóë́’hesta’, literally: "it stops here," i.e., "depot") is a town in Cattaraugus County, New York, United States. As of the 2020 census, the town population was 30, making it the least populous town in the state. The town is on the south edge of Cattaraugus County, south of the city of Salamanca.

== History ==
The area that would become the town was first settled by outsiders after 1827. The town of Red House was formed in 1869 from part of the town of Salamanca. It was named for its famous landmark, the Red House, a Civil War-era domicile located at the confluence of a small creek (later named Red House Creek) with the Allegheny River. The house was remarkable for its strange, dark crimson coloring and was originally constructed as a resting house for those traveling along the river.

Locals have expressed skepticism about claims that the house was haunted by members of the Frecks family (the Internet rumor claimed a number of the wealthy family's members died in an affair that involved fraternal adultery, exile, suicides, and the mysterious death of the family patriarch) has any historical basis, and a 1965 description of Red House's name origin lists the original owner of the house as being "unknown." Of the numerous ghost stories that are reputed in Red House, the Frecks story is not one of them, and the names and locations of the Frecks story do not match the historical record, which states that H. B. Freck never lived in nor near the titular red house, residing in a different part of the town. The house was a restaurant and hotel in its last years and, like most others in the town, was demolished in the early 1990s. A 1953 column in The Bradford Era made note of a legend that the house was originally owned by a native American at the time logging began in the area; a variant of the story, printed in another newspaper in 1962 and reprinted in 1972, states that only the door of the house was painted red.

Harvesting trees for lumber and other products was a major early industry; a chemical plant was built in the town to process the felled trees. The town's population peaked in the 1890s, the only time the town ever had more than 1,000 residents, and declined near-continuously from that point onward. In the mid-20th century, Red House was also an early center of the region's ski country industry, with two ski areas, the state-operated Bova ski resort and jumps (named after the Beauvais family who donated the land for the purpose) that ran from the 1930s until 1980, and the privately operated Big Basin ski area, which operated from 1951 to 1972.

The reason that Red House is so sparsely populated is because the vast majority of the town's land was used for the creation of Allegany State Park, which has no permanent population. Beginning in 1967, coinciding with the construction of the Kinzua Dam, the state began an eminent domain campaign to buy out the remainder of the town; at the time, the path of the Southern Tier Expressway (then "new Route 17," now Interstate 86) was routed directly through the core of the hamlet of Red House, allowing the state to seize and destroy most of the town residents' property. In 1973, the state tried but failed to claim the remaining privately held land in the town for park expansion. The eminent domain campaign has mostly gone quiet since the late 1990s; the state still has a standing offer to purchase any property that is either abandoned or put up for sale in the town. A small northwest corner remains outside the park's bounds, about half of which is on the Allegany Indian Reservation and much of the rest of which is occupied by Camp Li-Lo-Li, a Christian camp. The few residents remaining in the town are concentrated on a single road, Bay State Road (named after a lumber company from Massachusetts that built and used the road), sandwiched between the reservation and the park and southwest of the original hamlet. A local church was forcibly moved to Jimerson Town; another, a Roman Catholic chapel, remains standing but abandoned.

Red House was assigned the ZIP Code 14773. The United States Postal Service closed the office, which was located within the town's grocery store (the owner of the store doubled as the town postmaster), on June 30, 1964. Mail service from that point to the present day has been handled by a rural free delivery route through the Salamanca post office. William R. Costello, owner of the grocery store and the last postmaster for Red House, would later be reassigned to Limestone.

Red House is served by the Randolph Central School district, after that district annexed the Red House Consolidated School District (and its various one-room schools). In the wake of the Kinzua Dam construction, the residents petitioned to be transferred to the closer Salamanca City Central School District, but the Randolph district refused to do so, unwilling to give up the property tax revenues. Native Americans attended a separate school in the area, which was moved to Salamanca in 1965.

== Geography ==
According to the United States Census Bureau, the town has a total area of 55.9 square miles (144.7 km^{2}), of which 55.7 square miles (144.2 km^{2}) is land and 0.19 square miles (0.5 km^{2}), or 0.34%, is water.

The south town line is the border of Pennsylvania, and the northwest part of the town borders/includes the Allegany Reservation, defined by the Allegheny River.

Interstate 86 passes through the town, with access from Exit 19. There are also some mostly decommissioned portions of what used to be Route 17 and New York State Route 382. Allegany State Park Routes 1, 2 and 3 are the main routes serving the park and town. The northwest corner of Red House is detached from the rest of the town's roadways and is served by only one road, Sunfish Road, which can only be accessed by a detour of several miles through Coldspring.

The Erie Railroad operated a Red House station on its main line that closed by 1935.

=== Adjacent towns and areas ===
(Clockwise)

- Salamanca
- Great Valley; Carrollton
- Corydon Township, McKean County, Pennsylvania; Foster Township, McKean County, Pennsylvania
- Coldspring, what used to be Elko

== Demographics ==
Historical population
Census	Pop.	Note	%±
1870	407		—
1880	487		19.7%
1890	1,156		137.4%
1900	705		−39.0%
1910	513		−27.2%
1920	434		−15.4%
1930	313		−27.9%
1940	299		−4.5%
1950	234		−21.7%
1960	235		0.4%
1970	158		−32.8%
1980	110		−30.4%
1990	159		44.5%
2000	38		−76.1%
2010	38		0.0%
2020	30		−21.1%
2021 (est.)	30		0.0%
U.S. Decennial Census

As of the census of 2000, there were 38 people, 14 households, and 9 families residing in the town. The population density was 0.7 inhabitants per square mile (0.27/km^{2}). There were 25 housing units at an average density of 0.4 per square mile (0.15/km^{2}). The racial makeup of the town was 97.37% (37 people) White, and 2.63% (one person) Native American.

There were 14 households, out of which 42.9% (six) had children under the age of 18 living with them, 71.4% (ten) were married couples living together, and 28.6% (four) were non-families. 21.4% of all households (three in all) were made up of individuals, and 21.4% (three) had someone living alone who was 65 years of age or older. The average household size was 2.71 and the average family size was 3.30.

In the town, the population was spread out, with 26.3% (ten) under the age of 18, 7.9% (three) from 18 to 24, 23.7% (nine) from 25 to 44, 26.3% (ten) from 45 to 64, and 15.8% (six) who were 65 years of age or older. The median age was 42 years. For every 100 females, there were 81.0 males; for every 100 females age 18 and over, there were 75.0 males (thus there were 16 adult women, 12 adult men, five boys and five girls).

The median income for a household in the town was $70,417, and the median income for a family was $71,667. Males had a median income of $36,563 versus $36,250 for females. The per capita income for the town was $18,693. There were no families and two people living below the poverty line, both between the age of 18 and 64.

== Communities and locations in Red House ==
- Allegany Indian Reservation – A small part of this Seneca reservation cuts across Red House's northwest corner.
- Allegany State Park – Most of the town is within the park.
- Baystate (or Bay State) – A hamlet in the western part of the town and the current home of the town's permanent population and town government. Since the destruction of the original hamlet of Red House, the area is generally no longer known as Baystate and is known simply as "Red House."
- Frecks – A former hamlet in the southwest corner of the town, now the center of Allegany State Park's Quaker Area.
- Hall – A former hamlet in the eastern side of the town, where a sawmill and post office was erected by 1893. The Hall post office was closed no later than 1910, when the name was transferred to Hall's Corners, Ontario County, New York.
- Red House – A former hamlet in the northwestern part of the town near the Allegheny River.
- Red House Creek – The site of the first settlement. The name comes from a red-painted house that stood on the bank of the Allegany River.
- Red House Lake – A lake located east of the hamlet of Red House.
- Red House Station – A location northwest of the hamlet of Red House, the location of a former rail depot and tower.

== Notable people ==
- George Heron, president of the Seneca Nation in the late 1950s and early 1960s.
- Tim Horton, National Hockey League player, had a part-time residence in the town.
- Marvin Hubbard, National Football League player, was born and raised in Red House and continued to own property in the town until his death.
- Amasa Stone, 19th century rail magnate, built a portion of his hunting preserve in Red House.
