= Kinzua Dam =

Dam on the Allegheny River, Allegheny National Forest, Warren County, Pennsylvania, US

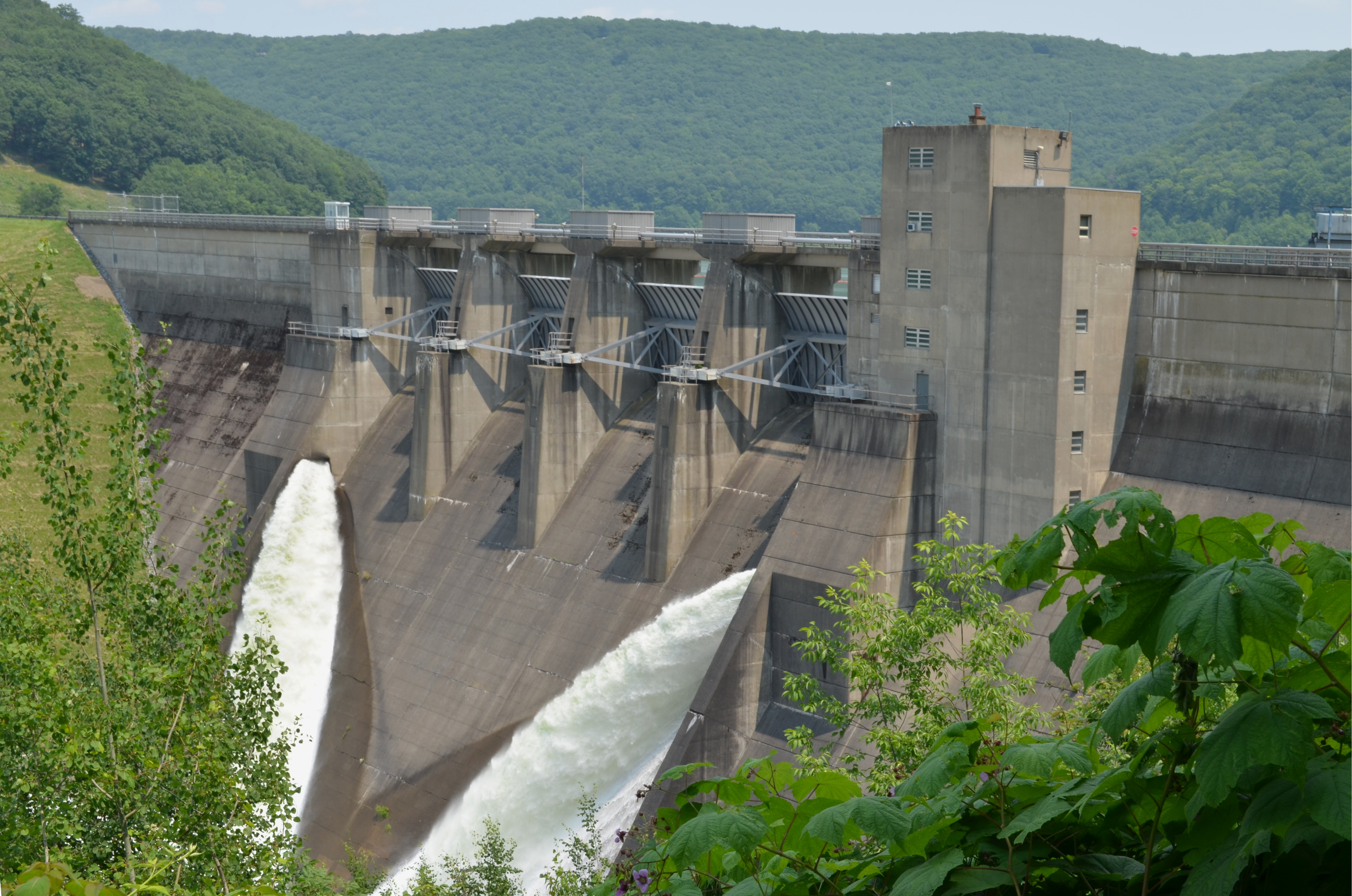
- Kinzua Dam in July 2015
- Interactive map of Kinzua Dam
- Official name: Kinzua Dam
- Location: Allegheny National Forest; Glade Township / Mead Township, Warren County, Pennsylvania, U.S.
- Coordinates: 41°50′16″N 79°0′11″W
- Construction began: 1960
- Opening date: 1965
- Operator: Army Corps of Engineers

Dam and spillways
- Impounds: Allegheny River
- Height: 179 feet (55 m)
- Length: 1,897 feet (578 m)
- Width (base): 1,245 feet (379 m)

Reservoir
- Creates: Allegheny Reservoir
- Total capacity: 1,300,000 acre-feet (1.6 km^{3})
- Active capacity: 573,000 acre-feet (0.707 km^{3})

The Kinzua Dam, on the Allegheny River in Warren County, Pennsylvania, is one of the largest dams in the United States east of the Mississippi River. It is located within the Allegheny National Forest.

The dam is located 6 miles (10 km) east of Warren, Pennsylvania, along Route 59, within the 500,000-acre (200,000 ha) Allegheny National Forest. A boat marina and beach are located within the dam boundaries. In addition to providing flood control and power generation, the dam created Pennsylvania's second deepest lake, the Allegheny Reservoir, also known as Kinzua Lake, and Lake Perfidy among the Seneca. Quaker Lake, a smaller artificial lake that empties into the reservoir, was also formed as a result of the dam.

The lake extends 25 miles to the north, nearly to Salamanca, New York, which is within the Allegany Reservation of the Seneca Nation of New York. Federal condemnation of tribal lands to be flooded for the project displaced more than 600 Seneca members and cost the reservation 10,000 acres (4,000 ha), nearly one-third of its territory and much of its fertile farmland.

== Construction ==
In 1936, a major flood struck the Pittsburgh metropolitan area and caused widespread damage. This prompted Congress to pass the Flood Control Acts of 1936 and 1938, authorizing the construction of a dam on the Allegheny River. Construction of the dam was not begun by the US Army Corps of Engineers until 1960. It was completed in 1965, and the filling of the reservoir continued until 1967.

By then, considerable opposition to the dam had developed, particularly among the Seneca Nation of Indians based in New York. The proposed flooding of lands behind the dam to create a lake for recreation and hydropower would make them lose most of the historic Cornplanter Tract in Pennsylvania as well as numerous communities and thousands of acres of fertile farmland in New York. More than 600 families were displaced by the project and forced to relocate. In practice, much of the area was already prone to flooding and not permanently habitable; by 1953, the Cornplanter Tract was almost deserted, in part because the Seneca refused to connect the tract to the electrical grid and because road travel was often unreliable. Special considerations had to be made for buildings in the floodplain, including elevating the furnaces several feet above ground level.

The main purpose of the dam was flood control on the Allegheny River. Kinzua controls drainage on a watershed of 2,180 square miles (5,650 km^{2}), an area twice the size of the state of Rhode Island. According to the Corps of Engineers, side benefits derived from the dam would include drought control, hydroelectric power production, and recreation. The hydroelectric power is distributed largely to Pittsburgh.

=== Engineering data ===
- Length of dam: 1,877 feet (572 m)
- Maximum height of dam: 179 feet (55 m)
- Earthfill: 3 million cubic yards (2.3 million m³)
- Concrete: 500,000 cubic yards (380,000 m³)
- Penstocks (pipes through dam): Eight 5’ 8" x 10’ discharge sluices and two hydroelectric penstocks, 15 feet (4.6 m) in diameter
- Hydroelectric generating capacity: 400 megawatts
- Construction Costs: $108 million

"Finished in 1965 at a cost of almost $120 million, (Note: ($1.23 billion in 2025)) it is the largest concrete and earth-fill dam in the eastern United States."

=== Economics ===
The total cost of construction was approximately $108 million. According to the US Army Corps of Engineers, Kinzua more than paid for itself in 1972 when tropical storm Agnes dumped continual heavy rains on the watershed, bringing the reservoir to within three feet of its maximum storage capacity. Downstream flood damages were avoided of an estimated $247 million. (Note: ($1.9 billion in 2025)) The dam at Kinzua has prevented an estimated $1 billion in flood damages since it became operational.

== Seneca Pumped Storage Generating Station ==
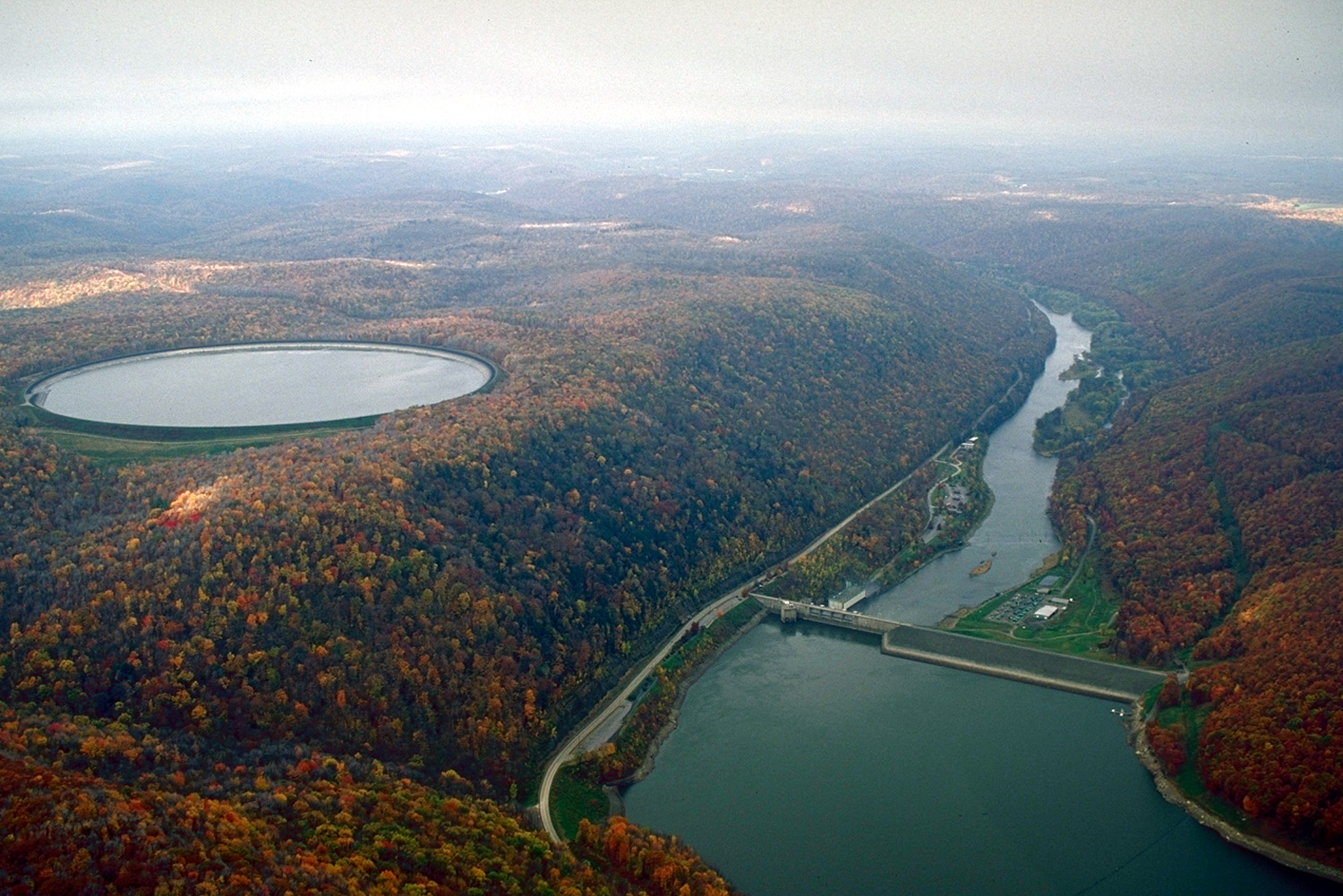
Seneca Pumped Storage Generating Station on the left, looking down river

Immediately above the downstream side of the dam is the Seneca Pumped Storage Generating Station, a hydroelectric power plant using pumped storage to accommodate peak electrical load by storing potential energy in water pumped into an upper reservoir. It uses base load electricity, then reclaims that energy when needed by allowing the water to fall back down and drive generators along the way.

== Recreation ==
The Allegheny Reservoir, also known as Kinzua Lake, and surrounding area have been opened up for a variety of recreational activities such as camping, hiking, snowmobiling and boating along the reservoir. The US Forest Service created four highly developed reservoir campgrounds, along with five primitive (boat to or hike only) camping areas. Several scenic overlooks with miles of hiking trails and information centers were also constructed along the reservoir. Much of Allegheny National Recreation Area surrounds Allegheny Lake. In addition, the Seneca Nation maintains a fully developed campground on their reservation at the northern end of the reservoir in New York.

== Displacements ==
=== Condemnation of Seneca land ===
Construction of the dam condemned 10,000 acres (4,000 ha) of the Allegany Reservation, nearly one third of its territory, which had been granted to the Seneca nation in the Treaty of Canandaigua, signed by President Washington. That resulted in the loss of considerable fertile farmland and the displacement and forced relocation of 600 Seneca from their community within the reservation. In 1961, citing the immediate need for flood control, President John F. Kennedy denied a request by the Seneca to halt construction.

Following the relocation were major changes to the displaced persons' way of life. Until the mid-20th century, numerous Seneca tribe members, particularly those in the floodplain, had lived simply according to traditional ways, with no modern conveniences such as electricity. Two residential resettlement areas were constructed, Jimersontown and an area south of Steamburg, both of which included modern amenities. The forced modernization is one source of the still-simmering resentment that Seneca have toward the dam.

In addition, the Seneca lost a 1964 appeal over the related relocation of a four-lane highway through the remaining portion of the Allegany Reservation. That caused them to lose more land to the interstate, which divides the reservation territory. (The reservation was allowed to reclaim land around the old highway that the interstate replaced.)

In Pennsylvania, the government also condemned most of the historic Cornplanter Tract, a grant made by the state legislature to Cornplanter after the Revolutionary War to him and his heirs "forever." The area included an historic cemetery containing the remains of Cornplanter and 300 descendants and followers, as well as a state memorial monument erected in 1866. The Seneca called the cemetery their "Arlington" in reference to the national cemetery near Washington, DC.

The state exhumed and reinterred the Seneca remains in a new cemetery, located west of the north-central Pennsylvania town of Bradford, about 100 yards from the New York state line. The cemetery also contains remains of white residents of Corydon, a town submerged by the reservoir. However, by 2009 Seneca observers and whites said there was erosion of the bluff where the cemetery was located. They pleaded for the state or Corps of Engineers to protect this area. Other remains were reinterred at a cemetery in Steamburg.

Cornplanter's last direct male heir and great-great-great-grandson, Jesse Cornplanter, an artist, had died without issue in 1957. By the 1960s, Cornplanter's indirect descendants had already moved to Salamanca, New York, near the northern shore of the new Allegheny Reservoir.

=== Condemnation of Corydon, Kinzua, Quaker Bridge, and Red House ===
The construction of the dam and the filling of the Allegheny Reservoir required the condemnation of several towns and communities in the reservoir's floodplain. Two townships, Kinzua in Pennsylvania and Elko (Quaker Bridge) in New York, dissolved their incorporations, while the Warren County portion of Corydon was likewise subsumed. Others, such as the McKean County portion of Corydon, Pennsylvania and Onoville, New York, retained their government but lost much of their population when the cores of their communities were flooded. All residents were forced out by the government's use of eminent domain and were required to relocate.

Red House, New York, was also indirectly affected by the changes. Although it was not directly flooded, the dam's first stress test in 1967 submerged New York State Route 17 west of Red House, and a new highway, the Southern Tier Expressway, would have to be constructed. The path of the highway was run almost directly through Red House's population center, which combined with the dam and the expansion of Allegany State Park prompted the state and the Army Corps of Engineers to forcibly condemn most of the town. Some of the town's residents bought parcels in what was then the hamlet of Baystate, located in the town a mile south of the highway, and were able to thwart efforts to forcibly dissolve the town when Allegany State Park proposed to expand again in 1973. Red House (population 30 as of 2020) has maintained its incorporation, with a few remaining families still holding onto their properties. In preparation for the eviction, the Onoville, Quaker Bridge, and Red House post offices were closed in summer 1964, and as a result, the ZIP codes for those towns were never officially used.

To partially compensate for the loss of the communities, the government set aside 305 acres of land for Seneca resettlement upstream in two New York communities: Steamburg (160 one-acre plots of land located south of the existing hamlet of the same name) and Jimerson Town (145 one-acre plots of land located west of the city of Salamanca, near the then-extant community of Shongo). Jimerson Town has become designated as one of the two capitals of the Seneca Nation.

The dam project also forced the displacement of Camp Olmsted, owned by the Chief Cornplanter Council of the Boy Scouts of America. The campsite had been located on bottomland along the Allegheny River, but the dam's construction forced it to be moved up the hillside.

== In other media ==
The song "As Long as the Grass Shall Grow", written by Peter La Farge and recorded by Johnny Cash as the first track of his 1964 album Bitter Tears: Ballads of the American Indian, relates the loss of Seneca Nation land in Pennsylvania due to the construction of the Kinzua Dam. Cash received resistance by radio stations to this material. The documentary Johnny Cash's Bitter Tears recounted these events and a re-imagining of the album was recorded to accompany it. This was aired on PBS in February 2016.

The fourth verse of Buffy Sainte-Marie's 1965 song "Now That The Buffalo's Gone" asks if the US Government is "...still taking our lands..." and refers to the treaty signed by George Washington that guaranteed the Seneca their lands. It asserts "...the treaty's being broken by Kinzua Dam," and asks "...what will you do for these ones?".

Left 4 Dead featured the Kinzua Dam in a cut campaign known as "Dam It." The campaign was released to players in 2016, having players end the campaign at the dam. The campaign bridges the gap between the "Dead Air" and "Blood Harvest" campaigns.

In 2014, filmmakers Paul Lamont and Scott Sackett began production of a documentary for PBS titled Lake of Betrayal, concerning the construction of Kinzua Dam and creation of Allegheny Reservoir. The film was released in October 2017.

The Kinzua Dam appears in the TV show See directed by Steven Knight and produced for Apple TV+ by Chernin Entertainment / Endeavor Content, it appears destroyed and leaking as the location for "the Queen" in that series.
