= George Heron =

Native American leader from New York, U.S. (1919–2011)

- Hah Seh Nogwas

Seneca Nation of Indians leader

Personal details
- Born: February 22, 1919 Red House, New York
- Died: May 26, 2011 (aged 92) Salamanca, New York
- Party: New Deal Party
- Relations: Sisters, Inez Redeye, Mary Snow, and Ada Heron.
- Children: Two sons, a daughter, two step-sons, and a step-daughter
- Parent(s): Parents, David and Flora Tallchief Heron
- Known for: Leading opposition to Kinzua Dam; and organizing resettlement efforts; cultural, community, and political work

George D. Heron (February 22, 1919 – May 26, 2011) was president of the Seneca Nation of Indians (Seneca Nation of New York) from 1958 to 1960 and again from 1962 to 1964. In addition to his cultural and community work, he is known as a leader of the Seneca opposition to Kinzua Dam, and for his work organizing the tribal resettlement.

Heron was known as a tribal historian, Seneca language linguist, and teacher. He worked extensively with William N. Fenton, an ethnologist who studied and wrote about the Seneca and Haudenosaunee Confederacy. A political progressive, Heron was a member of the New Deal Party, one of the political factions in the nation before the current Seneca Party achieved one-party rule in the 1990s.

== Biography ==
George D. Heron was born in 1919 on the Allegany Territory of the Seneca Nation of Indians. As a young man, Heron served in the Civilian Conservation Corps, cutting trees, as well as building "cabins, bridges and roads still in use" at Allegany State Park, as of 2008.

Mr. Heron enlisted in the United States Navy in November of 1941 and served until his discharge in 1945. He achieved the rank of pharmacist mate first class during the war and was assigned to the United States Navy Amphibious Forces in campaigns in Africa, Europe, the Middle East and the Pacific.

During Heron's tenure as President of the Seneca Nation of New York, from 1958 to 1960 and again from 1962 to 1964, tribal members strongly opposed relocation of residents for construction of Kinzua Dam, a federal project proposed for flood control and hydropower generation.

During the early 1960s, Heron had been instrumental in trying to persuade the U.S. government to use the Morgan Plan alternative which would have placed the Kinzua flood control dam in a different location. He made several trips to Washington D.C. and was assured assistance by President John F. Kennedy, but to no avail. Seven hundred members of the Seneca Nation were forced to sacrifice their ancestral homes and 10,000 acres of good-bottom farm land to make way for the Kinzua Dam project. A way of life was permanently destroyed.

Heron led the tribe's relocation efforts, and oversaw construction of two residential communities: Jimersontown and Steamburg. The tribe used compensation received following the "Kinzua Dam condemnation of Coldspring and a third of the reservation."

Treaty of Canandaigua

To us it is more than a contract, more than a symbol;
to us the 1794 Treaty is a way of life.

— George Heron

He also served as treasurer and councillor for the tribe.

Women, who had been denied the right to vote in Seneca elections, were granted suffrage during Heron's second term. Heron supported expanding suffrage as he felt the then-majority view of the Seneca men (who rejected multiple referendums to allow the women to vote) was too conservative and ignorant, which Heron believed harmed the tribe's efforts to negotiate with the outside world.

He was "a member of the Iroquois National Museum Board of Directors, representative to the New York State Department of Aging and leader of the Iroquois Agricultural Society", on the executive board of the National Congress of American Indians, and an elder of Jimerstown Presbyterian Church. He counted anthropologist William N. Fenton and State Senator Catharine M. Young among his personal friends. "He was employed by the Bridge, Structural & Ornamental Iron Workers Local #6, Buffalo, New York retiring in 1981."

His "Ga Ga Hut" pinto type pole bean variety has been sold as heirloom seeds. Some of his seed corn was submitted to Cornell University for safekeeping.

He died on May 26, 2011, aged 92.

== Awards ==
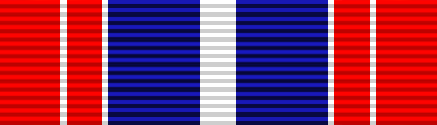
New York Medal for Merit (April 2010)
