= Maxine Crouse Dowler =

Maxine Crouse Dowler (Quaker Bridge, 4 February 1933 - Salamanca, 23 December 2015) was a teacher, Federal program administrator, member of the Board of Directors of the Seneca Nation Educational Foundation, member of the school board of the Salamanca, New York City Central School District that provides educational services to Seneca and other native American children residing on or near the Allegany Reservation of the Seneca Nation of Indians, Dowler was the first Seneca member of the Board of Education of the Cattaraugus-Allegany BOCES (Board of Cooperative Educational Services).

== Biography ==
Born and raised on the Allegany Reservation, and an enrolled member of the Seneca Nation of Indians, her "watch" regarding the education of native American children included the two decades following the construction of the Kinzua Dam to prevent annual flooding of Pittsburgh, Pennsylvania, downstream; the forced relocation of hundreds of Seneca from rural farms into principally two relocation areas (one just west of Salamanca at Jimersontown; the other 15 miles west of Salamanca and two miles north of the hamlet of Steamburg). Maxine spearheaded educational programs designed to help the Seneca adjust to very dramatic life changes, while at the same time retaining their Seneca language, culture and heritage.

Because of programs she helped to initiate and shape, and extraordinary personnel she was able to recruit Thomas E. Hogan, published historian of Seneca 19th-century history (Thomas E. Hogan, "City in a Quandary: Salamanca and the Allegany Leases," New York History 55 (Jan. 1974)), who served as a teacher, home school coordinator, grantsman and planner, and administrator; small college NCAA Lacrosse All Americans James Burnet and Tony "Mac" Diange who developed the first interscholastic lacrosse program in the school district's history; Peter Peterson, Michael Green and Kevin Reed who planned and provided community outreach, counseling, financial aid for higher education, and coordination across numerous programs through the Seneca Educational Foundation, and Avery and Fidelia Jimerson, leaders from Coldspring Longhouse who helped the Seneca children develop a Seneca social dance music and dance program that included the production of a 33 1/3 record album entitled "Seneca Social Dance Music," the production of the "You Call It Corn, We Call it Maize" Mazola Margarine Commercial of the 1970s that was seen throughout the US, and participation in the Tournament of Roses Parade in Pasadena, California, the Seneca language was taught for the first time in the Salamanca Public Schools, a 78% drop out rate of Seneca children was reduced over a 10-year period to 11%, and the educational progress of the Allegany Seneca leapfrogged over decades of failure and stagnation caused by poverty, neglect and institutional discrimination.
