= Tina Abrams =

American politician

President of the Seneca Nation of Indians
- Incumbent
- Assumed office November 10, 2026
- Preceded by: J. Conrad Seneca

Personal details
- Born: Cattaraugus Reservation, New York, U.S.
- Citizenship: Seneca Nation of Indians; United States
- Party: Seneca Party
- Children: 3

Tina Abrams is an American politician serving as president of the Seneca Nation of Indians since 2026. She was previously co-chair of the Seneca Nation Council. She is the first woman to hold both of these roles.

== Early life and education ==
Abrams was born and raised in Cattaraugus Reservation, Cattaraugus County, New York. She is a member of the Wolf Clan of the Seneca Nation of Indians (SNI). Her father Walden Jimerson and grandfather Morris Jimerson advocated for women's suffrage among SNI. In 1968, Abrams' grandmother Sybil Eels became the fourth Seneca woman elected to public office.

Abrams completed a degree in business management and marketing.

== Career ==
As a teenager, Abrams becan working for the Seneca Nation of Indians (SNI) recreation department. She later worked for 14 years in the fiscal department. She was an employee at Seneca Gaming and Entertainment for ten years.

Abrams was elected to the Seneca Nation Council in 2001. In 2012, she and Linda "Soupy" Doxtator became the first women appointed as council co-chair. In 2026, she was the first Native American woman to receive the Woman of Distinction Award from the New York State Senate.

In September 2026, Abrams won the Seneca Party caucus to be its presidential election nominee. On November 3 during the 2026 United States elections, Abrams was elected president of Seneca Nation, the first woman in the role. She won with 1,040 votes. She succeeds J. Conrad Seneca on November 10 for a two-year term. Alongside treasurer Lenith Waterman and clerk Bethany Johnson, they form the Nation's first all-female elected executive branch.

== Personal life ==
Abrams married John Abrams in the early 1980s. By 1994, they were among the few Seneca who were homeowners. They live in Jimerson Town, New York, with their three children.

== See also ==
- List of Native American politicians
- Native American women in politics
