= Allegany Indian Reservation =

Allegany Indian Reservation Ohi꞉yoʼ (Seneca)
- Indian Reservation
- Location of the Allegany Indian Reservation
- Coordinates: 42°06′26″N 78°47′28″W
- Country: United States
- State: New York
- County: Cattaraugus County
- Indian reservation: Seneca Nation

Population (2020)
  - Total: 6,664
- Demonym: Ohiyo꞉nöʼ

The Allegany Reservation (Seneca: Ohi꞉yoʼ) is a Seneca Nation of Indians reservation in Cattaraugus County, New York, U.S. The reservation's Native American residents are primarily members of the Seneca, but a smaller number of Cayuga, another Haudenosaunee nation, also reside there, and at least one family is known to have descended from the Neutral Nation. These inhabitants are collectively known in Seneca as the Ohiyo꞉nöʼ.

In the 2000 census, 58 percent of the population within the reservation boundaries were Native Americans. Some 42% were European Americans; they occupy properties under leases from the Seneca Nation, a federally recognized tribe. The population outside of the rented towns was 1,020 at the 2010 census. Prior to the 17th century, this area was occupied by the Iroquoian-speaking Wenrohronon and Eriehronon. The more powerful Seneca eliminated these competing groups during the Beaver Wars beginning in 1638, as the Haudenosaunee Confederacy sought to control the lucrative fur trade with the French and Dutch colonists.

== Geography ==
According to the United States Census Bureau, the Indian reservation has a total area of 43.7 mi^{2} (113.1 km^{2}). 36.4 mi^{2} (94.2 km^{2}) of it is land and 7.3 mi^{2} (18.8 km^{2}) of it (16.65%) is water.

The reservation borders both banks of the Allegheny River and is partially within several of the Towns in the south part of the county (South Valley, Cold Spring, Salamanca, Great Valley, Red House and Carrollton, with a very small portion in the town of Allegany). The City of Salamanca, with the exception of a northern spur along U.S. Route 219, is also located within the reservation.

The governmental headquarters for the Allegany Reservation are located in a small community known as Jimerson Town or Jo:nya:tih, an unincorporated hamlet located west of Salamanca on a stretch of dead-end road that used to be part of New York State Route 17. The government rotates every two years, alternating operations in Jimerson Town and Irving on the Cattaraugus Reservation. Jimerson Town's most recent turn began in November 2018.

In addition to Jimerson Town, significant developed communities on the reservation include: Highbanks, a community south of Steamburg that includes residences, smoke shops, a Faithkeepers School and a campground; Shongo, a sparsely populated hamlet south of Jimerson Town; Kill Buck (Jo’sgwä:da:se:h), a mixed community of both native and non-native residents; The Junction, a mostly commercial cluster surrounding an exit on Interstate 86; and Vandalia, the easternmost developed site on the reservation. South of Highbanks, the reservation is primarily undeveloped wilderness. Wilderness is also the predominant form between Steamburg and Shongo, where natives often take part in hunting and informal recreation. Each area is also given a name in the Seneca language: the Coldspring-Steamburg area is known as Jonegano:h, Shongo and Red House are known as Jóë́’hestaʼ (the depot, literally: "it stops here"), Salamanca is dubbed Onë:dagö:h (the swamp), while most of everything from Kill Buck eastward is named Dejódiha:ʼkdö:h (river bend). These names appear on markers on Interstate 86.

The reservation was defined adjacent to the Cornplanter Tract (Jonöhsade꞉gëh), a 1500-acre perpetual land grant given to Seneca chief Cornplanter and his descendants that extended into Pennsylvania. The Cornplanter Tract constituted the only reserved native lands in the state of Pennsylvania. By 1957, the year Cornplanter's last direct male heir (Jesse Cornplanter) died, the Cornplanter Tract was occupied only seasonally by the Seneca, the town's school had been closed in 1953, and no effort was made to electrify the tract.

During the 1930s and the Great Depression, the federal government authorized a major flood control project on the Allegheny River. Construction did not begin until 1961. The project envisioned construction of a dam and reservoir, to flood much of the Cornplanter Tract and the western portion of the Allegany Reservation. These areas were made uninhabitable during construction of the Kinzua Dam, which was completed in 1965.

The Allegheny Reservoir, also known as Kinzua Lake, reaches into New York and nearly to Salamanca. The Seneca were compensated primarily by grants of land set aside at Jimerson Town, where numerous houses were constructed, and a handful of other resettlement areas in New York.

== Demographics ==
Historical population
| Census | Pop. | Note | %± |
|---|---|---|---|
| 1900 | 1,833 | | — |
| 1910 | 1,627 | | −11.2% |
| 1920 | 934 | | −42.6% |
| 1930 | 972 | | 4.1% |
| 1940 | 1,151 | | 18.4% |
| 1950 | 1,131 | | −1.7% |
| 1960 | 1,059 | | −6.4% |
| 1970 | 1,113 | | 5.1% |
| 1980 | 1,243 | | 11.7% |
| 1990 | 1,143 | | −8.0% |
| 2000 | 1,099 | | −3.8% |
| 2010 | 1,020 | | −7.2% |
| 2014 (est.) | 994 | | −2.5% |
U.S. Decennial Census

As of the census of 2000, there were 1,099 people, 410 households, and 280 families residing in the Indian reservation (excluding the rented cities). The population density was 30.2/mi^{2} (11.7/km^{2}). There were 459 housing units at an average density of 12.6/mi^{2} (4.9/km^{2}). The racial makeup of the Indian reservation was 42.13% White, 0.82% Black or African American, 53.78% Native American, 0.45% Asian, 0.18% from other races, and 2.64% from two or more races. Hispanic or Latino of any race were 2.00% of the population.

There were 410 households, out of which 30.7% had children under the age of 18 living with them, 40.7% were married couples living together, 18.0% had a female householder with no husband present, and 31.7% were non-families. 24.1% of all households were made up of individuals, and 9.5% had someone living alone who was 65 years of age or older. The average household size was 2.63 and the average family size was 3.08.

In the Indian reservation the population was spread out, with 29.9% under the age of 18, 7.7% from 18 to 24, 27.2% from 25 to 44, 21.4% from 45 to 64, and 13.7% who were 65 years of age or older. The median age was 34 years. For every 100 females, there were 103.1 males. For every 100 females age 18 and over, there were 94.9 males.

The median income for a household in the Indian reservation was $28,971, and the median income for a family was $30,250. Males had a median income of $23,958 versus $20,982 for females. The per capita income for the Indian reservation was $12,681. About 17.0% of families and 22.6% of the population were below the poverty line, including 24.7% of those under age 18 and 22.3% of those age 65 or over.

== Notable people ==
- Maxine Crouse Dowler (1933–2015), educator
- Maris Bryant Pierce (1811–1874), Seneca chief, lawyer, land-rights activist
- Sanford Plummer, Seneca painter
- George Heron, Seneca chief who opposed Kinzua Dam
- Traynor Ora Halftown, Philadelphia children's show host
- Phyllis Bardeau (1934-2023), Seneca Language educator
