= Salamanca City Central School District =

New York State public school district

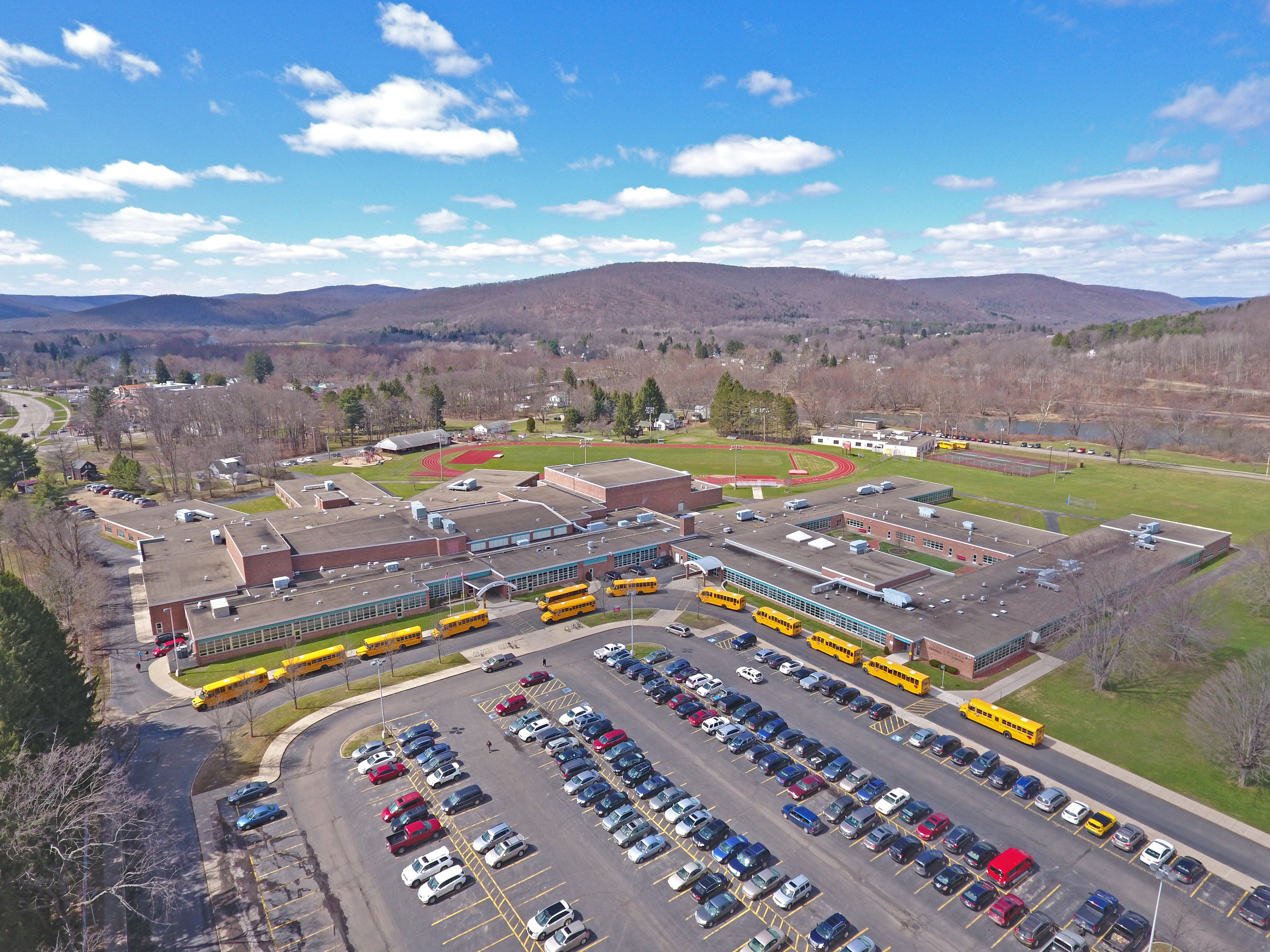

Location
- Salamanca, New York

District information
- Type: Public School
- Grades: Pre-K-12
- Superintendent: Mark D. Beehler

Students and staff
- Enrollment: 1400
- District mascot: Warriors

Other information
- Website: salamancany.org

Salamanca City Central School District is a New York state public school district that serves the city of Salamanca, New York and surrounding communities. It consists of three schools for students grades Pre-Kindergarten through 12: Prospect Elementary School, Seneca Intermediate School, and Salamanca High School. Seneca Intermediate and Salamanca High share the same building at 50 Iroquois Drive in the city.

The district has an enrollment of approximately 1,400 students, with more than 400 each attending Prospect Elementary (Pre-K-3), Seneca Intermediate (4-7), and Salamanca High School (8-12). The professional staff consists of approximately 200 teaching and support personnel, 12 administrators and a superintendent.

== Administration ==
The district office is located at the main campus building at 50 Iroquois Drive in Salamanca. Mark D. Beehler is the current superintendent.

== Board of education ==
The district board of education generally meets on the second and fourth Tuesday of each month in the Large Group Instruction (LGI) room on the main campus. Theresa A. Ray is a long-time board member and current president.

=== Board Members ===
- Theresa A. Ray, President
- Kerry John, Vice President
- Tadd Rider
- Dale R. Colton
- Donnald "Flip" White
- Sue A. Fries
- Bradley Earley
- Janet L. Koch, District Clerk

== Native American Population ==
The district schools are located on the Allegany portion of the Seneca Nation of Indians Reservation. Approximately 36% of the student population is Native American.

=== Funding ===
The district receives special state and federal funding each year to serve students residing on the Allegany Territory. Funding includes a Native American Tuition contract with New York state and federal USDOE Impact Aid support to offset the effect of tribally held lands on the local school tax base.

== Graduation Rates ==
Student graduation rates have increased since 2011. Over that span, Native American graduation rate has risen from 41% to 86%. For all learners, the rate has improved from 66% to 86%.

== STEAM Program ==
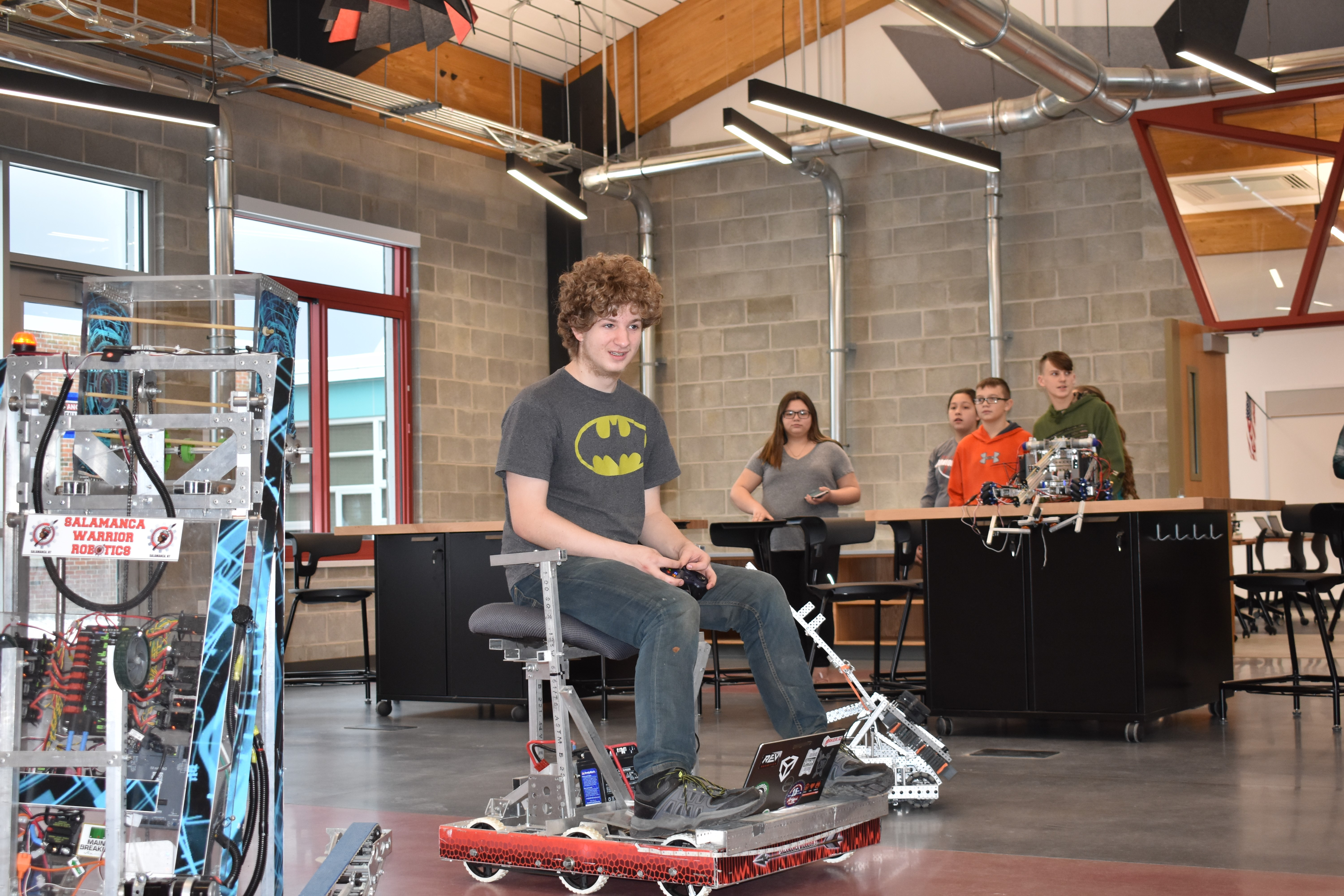
Salamanca City Central School has been recognized nationally for its STEAM programs and offerings.

The district has been implementing Science, Technology, Engineering, Arts, and Mathematics (STEAM) programming in its academic curriculum at all grade levels. It established a nation-wide STEAM and technological partnership with WozED in 2019, allowing Salamanca to become the first public school district in the United States to be a comprehensive K-12 STEAM Pathway District. The district has also partnered with Sky-Op, a US drone technology company and 017A commercial flight licensing.

As part of a $34.7 million capital project, the district constructed and opened a STEAM Center in 2019. The wing includes maker spaces, robotics labs, and classrooms for 3D prototyping, technology, computer aided design, and art.

The district was named a national school of STEM excellence in 2019 at the International Future of Education Technology Conference (FETC) in Miami, Florida. Only three schools in North America earned that distinction.

During the 2020 COVID-19 pandemic, the district used its 3D printing capabilities to produce N95 facemasks for healthcare and front line workers.

== Use of Technology ==
Each student is given a mobile laptop device to use at home and school. Each classroom is outfitted with an interactive board, and the district employs a Wi-Fi network that connects all buildings digitally and allows for video conferencing capabilities within and outside the school district.

The district has partnered with TeleMobile Medicine, a mobile physical and mental health services company, to provide students immediate access to healthcare services during the school day.

== Athletics ==
The district sponsors 19 teams across a variety of sports for boys and girls in grades 7-12. Salamanca has won 12 sectional football titles and advanced to the state Class C championship game in 1999.

== Salamanca High School ==
Salamanca High School is located at 50 Iroquois Drive in Salamanca. The school serves students in grades 8-12. The current principal is Christopher Siebert. The assistant principal is Lynette Magiera.

== Seneca Intermediate School ==
Seneca Intermediate is located in the district's main campus building at 50 Iroquois Drive in Salamanca. The school serves students in grades 4-7. The current principal is Nicole Beaver.

== Prospect Elementary ==
Prospect Elementary School is located at 300 Prospect Avenue in Salamanca. The school serves students in grades Pre-Kindergarten-3. The current principal is Kimberly Oakes.
