= William N. Fenton =

American anthropologist (1908–2005)

William Fenton
- Born: 15 December 1908; New Rochelle, New York, United States
- Died: 17 June 2005 (aged 96); Cooperstown, New York, United States
- Education: Dartmouth College (B.A.); Yale University (PhD)

William Nelson Fenton (December 15, 1908 – June 17, 2005) was an American scholar and writer known for his extensive studies of Haudenosaunee history and culture. He started his studies of the Iroquois in the 1930s and published a number of significant works over the following decades. His final work was published in 2002. During his career, Fenton was director of the New York State Museum and a professor of anthropology at the State University of New York.

== Early career (1908–1955) ==
Fenton was born William Nelson Fenton in New Rochelle, New York, in 1908. The Fenton family had had interactions with the Seneca people since the 1860s. He grew up in western New York, where the Seneca had their traditional territory. After attending local schools, he studied at Dartmouth College, where he graduated in 1931. He went on for graduate study and earned a doctorate in anthropology from Yale University in 1937. (From 1935 until he received his doctorate in 1937, Fenton was also a community worker for the New York Indian Service. He mainly worked on the Tonawanda Reservation).

During the 1930s, Fenton lived among the Seneca in western New York, becoming fluent in their language and doing field studies. The Seneca nation adopted Fenton into the Hawk clan on January 26, 1934. This was the same clan that had adopted Lewis Morgan.

Fenton soon became known as a leader of studies of the Haudenosaunee. Fenton wrote a number of position papers during the 1940s and 1950s that outlined problems and issues relating to Haudenosaunee studies which required further work. He encouraged other students of the Haudenosaunee to meet and discuss issues of concern in the field, notably in meetings at Red House in New York. Fenton focused attention on such issues as diversity in culture and connections between northern and southern tribes.

In his work as an ethnologist with the Smithsonian Institution's Bureau of American Ethnology, Fenton drew attention to existing historic and ethnographic sources. During the 1930s and 1940s, Fenton undertook substantial studies of Haudenosaunee music and dance while working at the Smithsonian.

It has been noted that Fenton's career saw profound changes in anthropological methods and how research was perceived, with "the patron-client relationships of anthropologist and "informant" ... greeted with increasing suspicion by young Haudenosaunee after the 1950s". Furthermore, Fenton's classic work was carried out when "...Iroquois ceremonialists were worried about the potential loss of their knowledge and delighted in having someone who wanted to listen and to record it".

== Later career (1956–2005) ==
After becoming senior ethnologist at the Smithsonian Institution in the 1950s, and then serving as executive secretary for anthropology and psychology at the National Research Council, he went to work at the New York State Museum at Albany in 1954. Becoming director, he developed an extensive collection of Haudenosaunee materials. Some tribal representatives criticized Fenton for failing to return artifacts. He regarded museums as necessary safeguards for cultural heritage. Some tribal leaders also criticized him for revealing too much material about sacred rituals.

Fenton chaired the Committee on Anthropological Research in Museums (CARM) from 1965 to 1973, during the majority of its life. CARM, a subcommittee of the American Anthropological Association, encouraged scholarly use of museums and museum collections in anthropological research. CARM also encouraged the early use of computers in documenting and inventorying museums collections across North America. In 1965, Fenton was awarded the Cornplanter Medal.

Fenton left the New York State Museum to become Professor of Anthropology at the State University of New York at Albany. He worked there until his retirement in 1979. He remained active in continued research and writing about the Haudenosaunee. He published The Great Law and the Longhouse: A Political History of the Iroquois in 1998 when he was nearly 90.

He died on June 17, 2005, in Cooperstown, New York, at the age of 96, on the way to the hospital.

== Honours ==
Fenton served as President of a number of academic societies: the American Folklore Society (1959-1960), the American Ethnological Society (1959), and the American Society for Ethnohistory (1961).

He was also a member of a number of committees, including the Phillips Fund Committee of the American Philosophical Society (1975-1991) and of the American Committee of the Permanent Council of the International Congress of Anthropological and Ethnological Sciences (1952-1972).

== Publications ==
Fenton wrote extensively on Haudenosaunee ethnology, historiography, the history of anthropology, and museum anthropology for several decades. Some of his works include:

- Fenton, William N (1936). An outline of Seneca ceremonies at Coldspring longhouse. New Haven; London: Yale University Press; Humphrey Milford, Oxford University Press. OCLC 898849862.
- Fenton, William N. (1940), "Problems Arising from the Historic Northeastern Position of the Iroquois", in Julian H. Steward (ed.), Essays in Historical Anthropology of North America, Smithsonian Miscellaneous Collections 100, Washington, DC: Smithsonian Institution, pp. 159–252
- Fenton, William N. (1942), "Contacts between Iroquois herbalism and colonial medicine", Annual Report of the Smithsonian Institution for 1941, Washington, DC, pp. 503–526, ISBN 0-8466-4032-5
- Fenton, William N. (1942), Songs from the Iroquois longhouse: from the Archive of the American Folk Song (in Iroquoian), Washington, D.C.: Library of Congress, Division of Music, Recording Laboratory, 1942, OCLC 977773150, retrieved March 3, 2022
- William N. Fenton, ed. (1951), Symposium on Local Diversity in Iroquois Culture, Bureau of American Ethnology Bulletin 149, Washington, DC: United States Government Printing Office; Smithsonian Institution
- Fenton, William N. (1952). "The Training of Historical Ethnologists in America". American Anthropologist. 54 (3): 328–339. doi:10.1525/aa.1952.54.3.02a00040. ISSN 0002-7294. JSTOR 664070.
- Fenton, William N. (1980). The roll call of the Iroquois chiefs : [a study of a mnemonic cane from the Six Nations Reserve. New York: AMS Press. ISBN 0-404-15536-7. OCLC 5941046.
- Fenton, William Nelson (1953). The Iroquois Eagle Dance, an offshoot of the Calumet Dance. Washington: Governm. Print. Office. OCLC 600386008.
- Fenton, William N. (1960), "The Museum and Anthropological Research", Curator, 3 (4): 327–355, doi:10.1111/j.2151-6952.1960.tb01697.x
- Fenton, William N. (1962), "Ethnohistory and Its Problems", Ethnohistory, 9 (1): 1–23, doi:10.2307/480783, ISSN 0014-1801, JSTOR 480783
- Fenton, William N. (1966), "Field Work, Museum Studies, and Ethnohistorical Research", Ethnohistory, 13 (1/2): 71–85, ISSN 0014-1801, JSTOR 480779
- Fenton, William N. (1974), "The Advancement of Material Culture Studies in Modern Anthropological Research", in Miles Richardson (ed.), The Human Mirror: Material and Spatial Images of Man, Baton Rouge, LA: Louisiana State University Press, pp. 15–36
- Fenton, William N. (1979), "Cherokee-Iroquois Connections Revisited", Journal of Cherokee Studies, 3 (4): 239–249
- Fenton, William N. (1986), "Sapir as Museologist and Research Director, 1910–1925", in William Cowan; Michael K. Foster; E. F. K. Koerner (eds.), New Perspectives in Language, Culture, and Personality, Amsterdam: John Benjamins, pp. 215–240
- Fenton, William N. (1987), The False Faces of the Iroquois, Norman, OK: University of Oklahoma Press, ISBN 0-8061-2039-8
- Fenton, William N. (1998), The Great Law and the Longhouse: A Political History of the Iroquois Confederacy, Norman, OK: University of Oklahoma Press, ISBN 0-8061-2039-8
- Fenton, William N. (2002), The Little Water Medicine Society of the Seneca, Norman, OK: Publisher: University of Oklahoma Press, ISBN 0-8061-3447-X
- Fenton, William N. (2007), Iroquois Journey – An Anthropologist Remembers (posthumous ed.), Norman, OK: University of Nebraska Press, ISBN 978-0-8032-2021-8

== See also ==
- George Heron
- Dean Snow
