= Irving, New York =

Hamlet in New York, United States

Coordinates: 42°34′03″N 79°06′46″W

Irving (Seneca: Jogéo’dza:e’) is a tri-county hamlet primarily located in both Chautauqua County and Erie County, as well as a small area of Cattaraugus County, New York. Most of Irving is included as part of the Cattaraugus Reservation of the Seneca Nation of Indians. The area of the hamlet not included on the Reservation is located on the northeastern border of the town of Hanover. U.S. Route 20 and New York State Route 5 pass through the hamlet, which is next to Cattaraugus Creek; New York State Route 438 terminates just across the creek. The elevation of the hamlet is 584 feet (178 m) above sea level. The ZIP Code for Irving is 14081.

The hamlet serves as the mailing address for the Seneca nation's governmental headquarters on the Cattaraugus Reservation. Irving alternates as the headquarters with Jimerson Town on the Allegany Reservation every two years (2018-20, 2022-24, 2026-28). Several tax-free gasoline stations and smoke shops are located in the hamlet, as is Seneca Gaming and Entertainment, a Seneca-owned bingo hall.

Sunset Bay, another small community, is located just west of Irving. Sunset Bay frequently floods during unseasonably warm winter days because of ice jams that form in the nearby Cattaraugus Creek as water melts.

There is a popular summer beach community on Snyder Beach for non-Indians (one of the few such locations on the Cattaraugus Reservation). About 170 families lease summer cottages at Snyder Beach on Lake Erie; some had come to the area for generations. The Seneca had repeatedly notified the landowner, John Metzger, that the property was within the reservation and he was not allowed to lease to non-Seneca. In July 2012, Sunset Bay was raided by Seneca marshals, who tried to evict all non-Seneca lessees because they were not members of the tribe. Seneca officials said that only the Tribal Council could give permission to non-Seneca to live in reservation land. As of the end the summer, the action was revoked and the 170 non-Seneca lessees were honored and permitted to stay.

The Thomas Indian School of Irving was listed on the National Register of Historic Places in 1973.
