= Cattaraugus Reservation =

Cattaraugus Reservation Seneca: Ga’dä꞉gë́sgë꞉öʼ Cayuga: Gada꞉gráhsgę̱hę꞉ˀ Seneca Nation Cattaraugus Territory
- Location of Cattaraugus Reservation in New York
- Coordinates: 42°33′N 79°01′W
- Country: United States
- State: New York
- Counties: Erie, Chautauqua, and Cattaraugus
- Nation: Seneca Nation of Indians
- Established: 1797 (Treaty of Big Tree); reconfigured in 1802

Area
  - Total: 34.41 sq mi (89.13 km^{2})
  - Land: 33.55 sq mi (86.9 km^{2})
  - Water: 0.86 sq mi (2.2 km^{2})
- Elevation: 590 ft (180 m)

Population (2020)
  - Total: 2,676
  - Density: 77.76/sq mi (30.02/km^{2})
- Demonym: Ga’dä꞉gë́sgë꞉onöʼ
- Time zone: UTC-5 (EST)
  - Summer (DST): UTC-4 (EDT)
- ZIP Codes: 14006, 14081
- Area code: 716
- Website: Seneca Nation of Indians

The Cattaraugus Reservation (Seneca: Ga’dä꞉gë́sgë꞉öʼ, Cayuga: Gada꞉gráhsgę̱hę꞉ˀ) is an Indian reservation of the federally recognized Seneca Nation of Indians in New York. The Seneca are one of the Six Nations of the Haudenosaunee Confederacy. The reservation is populated primarily by Seneca people as well as some Cayuga people.

Seneca farmland and cornfields on the Cattaraugus flats, pictured in a report published in 1910

The original Cattaraugus lands were reserved under the 1797 Treaty of Big Tree. In 1802, the Senecas exchanged them for a tract extending inland along Cattaraugus Creek. An 1826 agreement purported to convey about eight square miles of the reservation to private purchasers. The disputed Second Treaty of Buffalo Creek of 1838 threatened the Senecas with removal, but the Third Treaty of Buffalo Creek of 1842 preserved their possession of Cattaraugus and Allegany. The Seneca Nation established its elected constitutional government in 1848.

In the 2020 United States census, the reservation had a population of 2,676 and a total area of about 34.4 square miles (89.1 km^{2}). Its residents are known as Ga’dä꞉gë́sgë꞉onöʼ. The reservation stretches from Lake Erie inward along Cattaraugus Creek, along either side of NY 438. It is divided among three counties for census purposes:

- Cattaraugus Reservation, Cattaraugus County
- Cattaraugus Reservation, Chautauqua County
- Cattaraugus Reservation, Erie County.

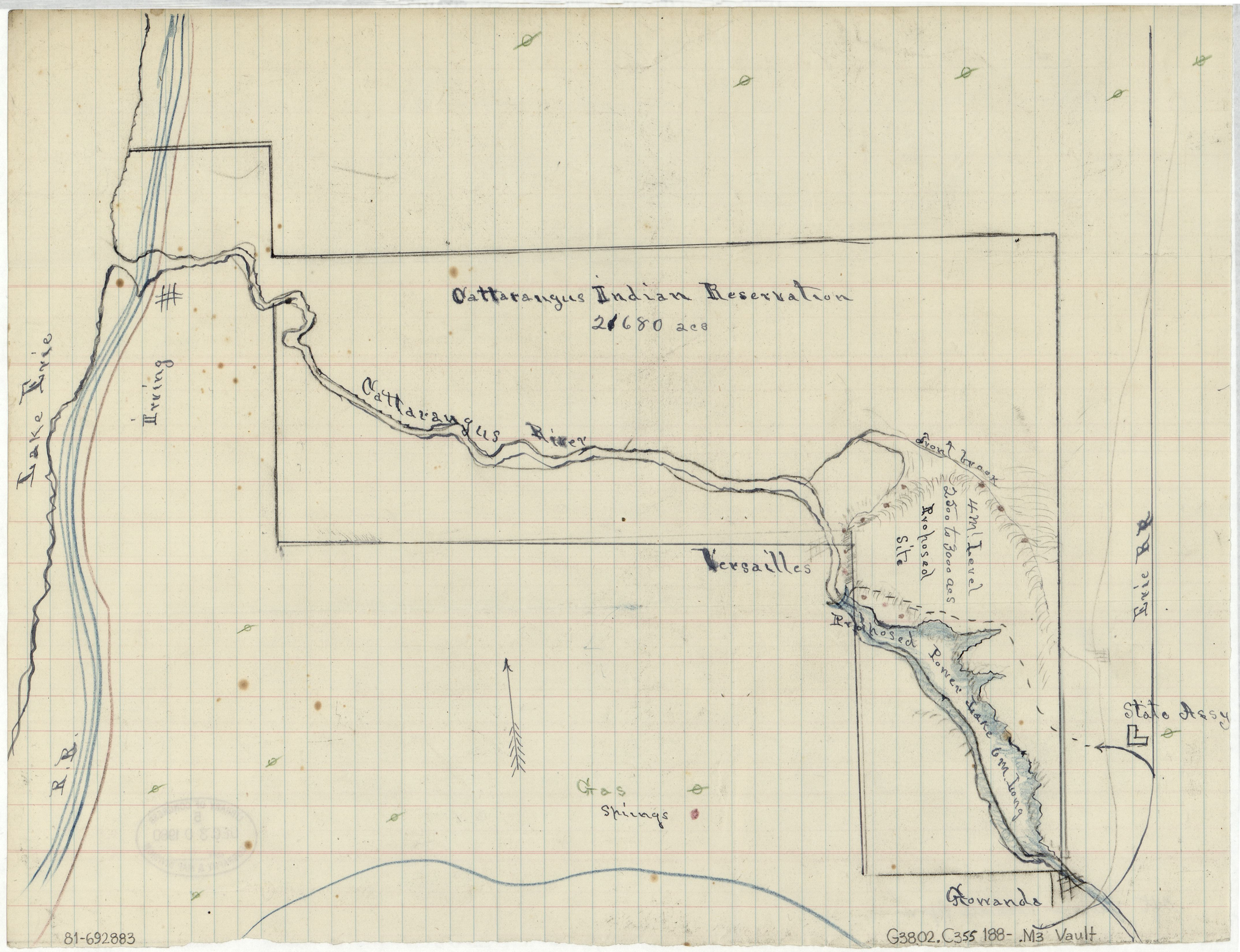
Sketch map of the Cattaraugus Indian Reservation, 1880

== Background and location ==
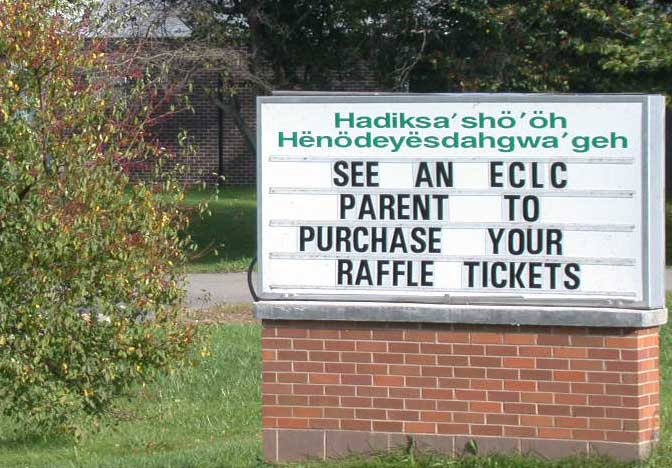
Sign in the Seneca language outside the Early Childhood Learning Center on the Cattaraugus Reservation

Seneca-owned businesses are located along US 20 and NY 5 where they cross the reservation. Facilities include cannabis dispensaries, a bingo hall and video gaming machines. Interstate 90 passes through the reservation; the closest exit is located in Irving, New York.

In Erie County, the reservation is bordered by the Towns of Brant, North Collins, and Collins; in Cattaraugus County by the Town of Perrysburg; and in Chautauqua County by the Town of Hanover. (At the reservation's southeast corner, near the village of Gowanda, it comes within a few feet of bordering the Town of Persia in Cattaraugus County.)

The reservation is mostly of a rural character, with one-family homes along Route 438 interspersed with businesses such as tobacco shops. The reservation is divided into several communities such as Newtown (Tganödase:’), Bucktown (Onödagö́:gwa:h), Pinewoods (O’sóägö:h), Eleven Acres (Sga:sge’ neyonögeshä:ge:h), Ozarks, and Indian Hill (Sgëhö:dih). At the center of the reservation along Route 438 are the Seneca Nation government offices, a Head Start/Daycare Center, community buildings, and the volunteer fire department.

The Thomas Indian School, a boarding institution for Indigenous children founded in 1855 and closed in 1957, operated on the reservation.

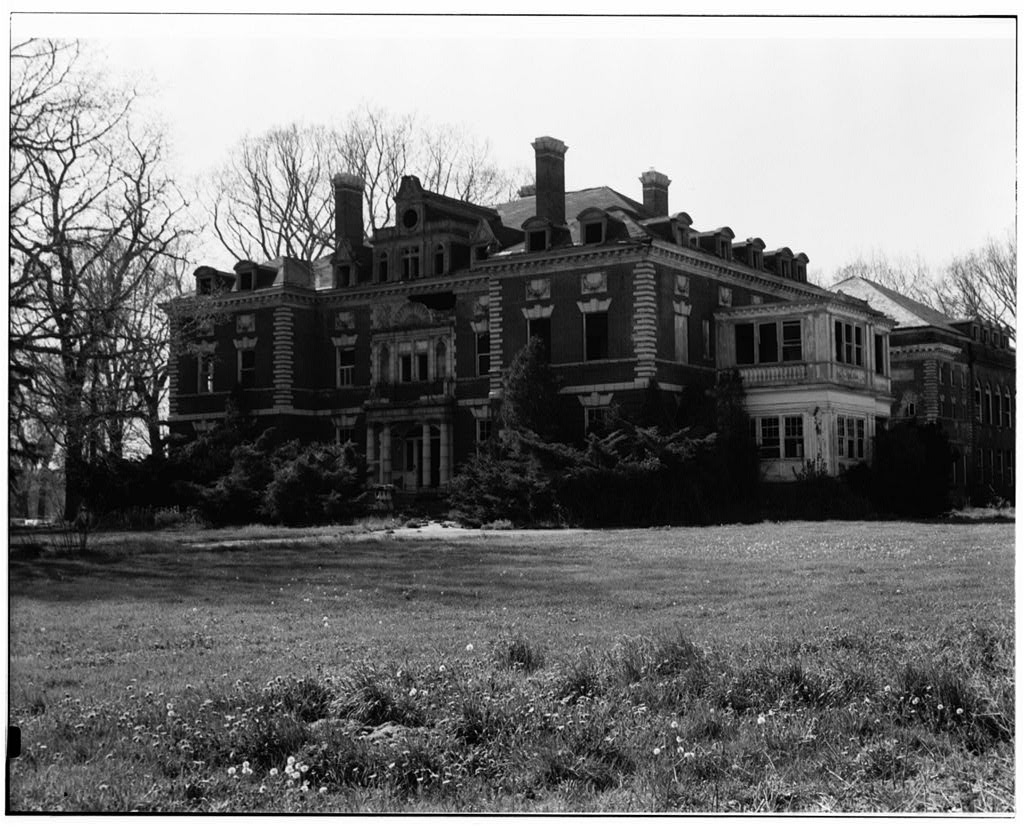
Administration building of the Thomas Indian School, photographed in 1981

=== Transit ===
The Seneca Transit System operates buses between Irving and Steamburg, connecting the Cattaraugus and Allegany territories with surrounding communities, including Gowanda and Salamanca. NFTA Metro Route 76 (Lakeshore Express) also serves the reservation at Seneca One Stop on Route 5, connecting it with downtown Buffalo via Farnham, Angola and Athol Springs.
