= Sunset Bay, New York =

- Census-designated place
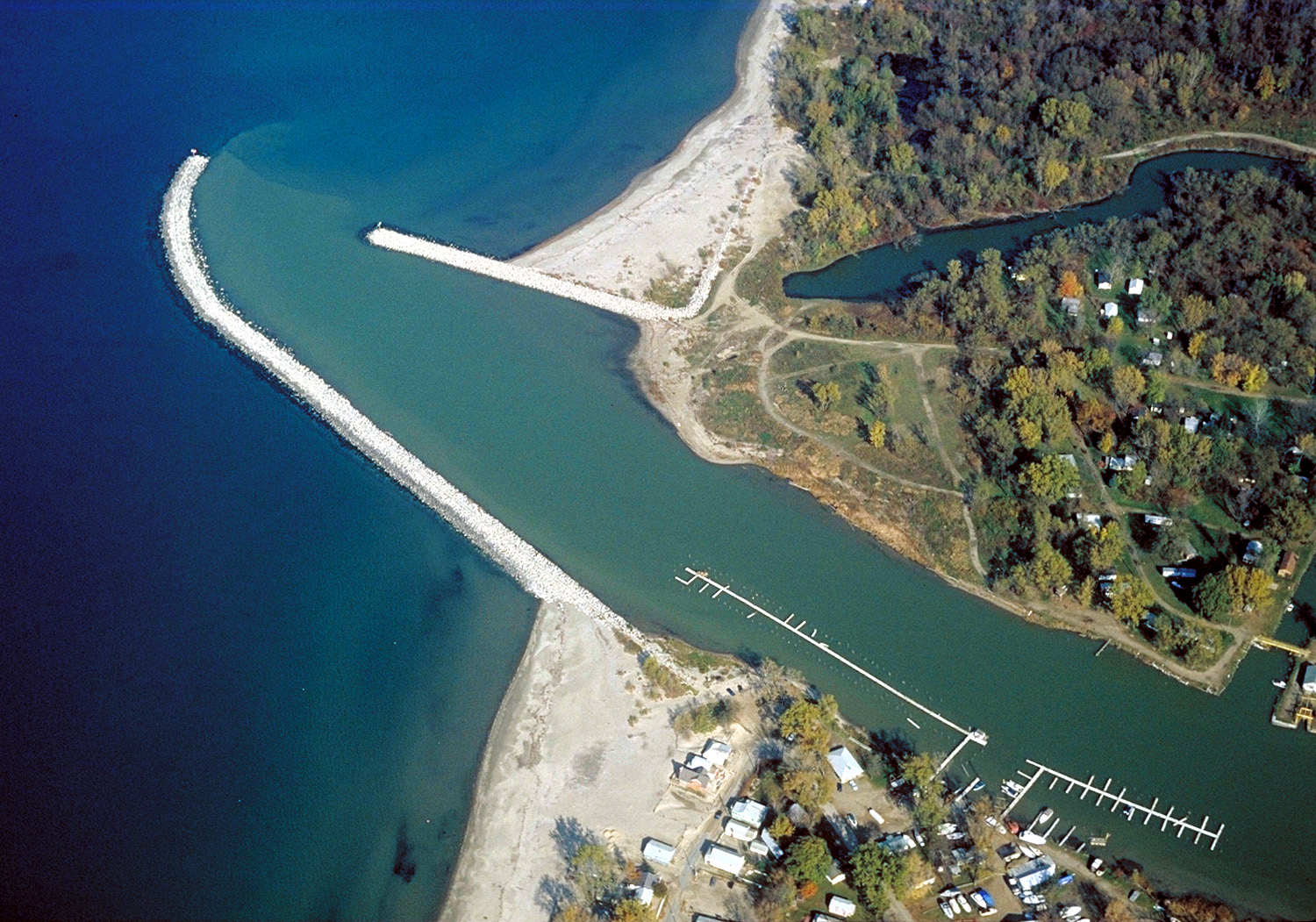
- The mouth of the Cattaraugus Creek as seen from overhead. At bottom is the community of Sunset Bay; at top is Snyder Beach on the Cattaraugus Reservation.

- Location within New York Location within the United States
- Coordinates: 42°33′38″N 79°7′54″W
- Country: United States
- State: New York
- County: Chautauqua
- Town: Hanover

Area
  - Total: 0.71 sq mi (1.83 km^{2})
  - Land: 0.66 sq mi (1.72 km^{2})
  - Water: 0.042 sq mi (0.11 km^{2})
- Elevation: 580 ft (180 m)

Population (2020)
  - Total: 470
  - Density: 709/sq mi (273.6/km^{2})
- Time zone: UTC-5 (Eastern (EST))
  - Summer (DST): UTC-4 (EDT)
- ZIP Codes: 14081 (Irving); 14136 (Silver Creek)
- Area code: 716
- FIPS code: 36-72246
- GNIS feature ID: 0966831

Sunset Bay is a hamlet and census-designated place (CDP) in the town of Hanover in Chautauqua County, New York, United States. As of the 2020 census, Sunset Bay had a population of 470.

Sunset Bay is adjacent to the Cattaraugus Indian Reservation. On the reservation, adjacent to Sunset Bay, was previously home to a community of approximately 80 non-native residents who leased vacation homes. The Seneca Nation in 2012 declared the longstanding presence of the non-native residents an "illegal occupation" and drove them out of Sunset Bay.

== Geography ==
Sunset Bay is located on the shore of Lake Erie in the northernmost point of the town of Hanover and of Chautauqua County. It is bordered on the northeast by Cattaraugus Creek, which enters Lake Erie just north of an embayment called Sunset Bay. U.S. Route 20 and New York State Route 5 pass through the community as Main Road. Just east of the community is a short connector road from US 20/NY 5 to Exit 58 on the New York State Thruway (Interstate 90). The city of Dunkirk is 12 miles (19 km) to the southwest of Sunset Bay, and Buffalo is 29 miles (47 km) to the northeast.

The nature of Cattaraugus Creek and its volatility leaves the hamlet prone to frequent flooding, especially in the spring.

According to the United States Census Bureau, Sunset Bay has a total area of 0.69 square miles (1.8 km^{2}), of which 0.66 square miles (1.7 km^{2}) is land and 0.04 square miles (0.1 km^{2}), or 6.27%, is water.

== Demographics ==
Historical population
| Census | Pop. | Note | %± |
|---|---|---|---|
| 2020 | 470 | | — |
U.S. Decennial Census
