= New York State Route 438 =

State highway in Erie County, New York, US

New York State Route 438
- Map of western New York with NY 438 highlighted in red

Route information
- Maintained by NYSDOT, Erie County, the town of Collins, and the village of Gowanda
- Length: 11.78 mi (18.96 km)
- Existed: mid-1940s–present

Major junctions
- South end: US 62 / NY 39 in Gowanda
- North end: US 20 / NY 5 in Brant

Location
- Country: United States
- State: New York
- Counties: Erie

Highway system
- New York Highways; Interstate; US; State; Reference; Parkways
← NY 437	→ NY 439

New York State Route 438 (NY 438) is a north–south state highway located entirely in Erie County, New York, in the United States. Though signed as north–south, the route runs in an almost east–west direction for 11.78 miles (18.96 km) between Gowanda and Irving through the Cattaraugus Indian Reservation. The southern terminus of the route is at an intersection with U.S. Route 62 (US 62) and NY 39 in Gowanda. Its northern terminus is at a junction with US 20 and NY 5 in Irving. The route was assigned in the mid-1940s.

== Route description ==
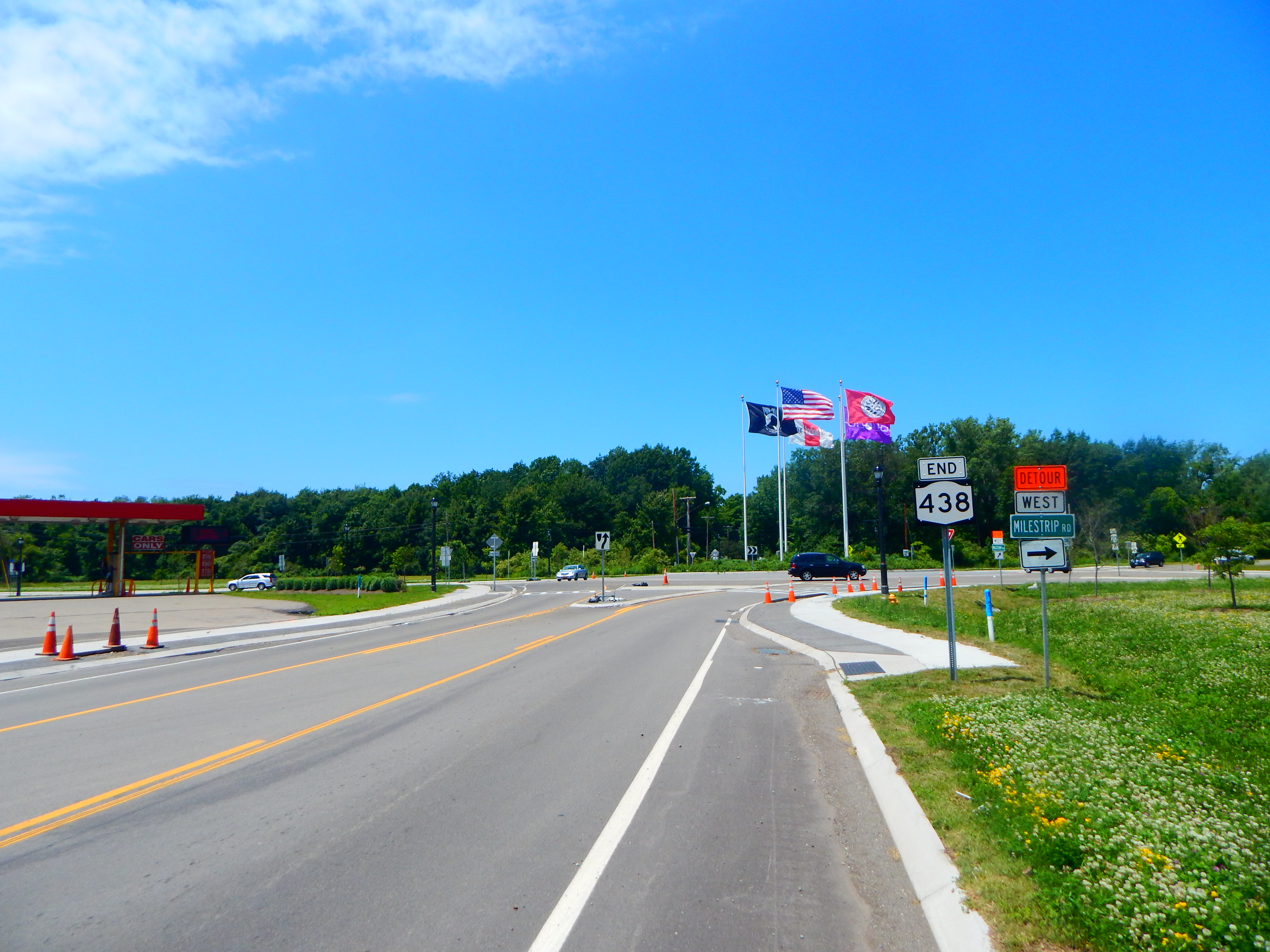
NY 438 approaching US 20/NY 5 in Brant

NY 438 begins at an intersection with US 62 and NY 39 in northern Gowanda. The route heads north, inheriting the Buffalo Street moniker from US 62 and NY 39, which turn east at NY 438's southern terminus. Outside of the village in Collins, the route becomes Four Mile Level Road as it curves westward into the Cattaraugus Indian Reservation. As its name implies, the route traverses relatively level terrain for a stretch of roughly 4 miles (6 km) as it parallels the northern bank of Cattaraugus Creek to the northwest and west. During this stretch, NY 438 intersects both Versailles–Plank Road and Brant Road (southern terminus of County Route 9 or CR 9) and crosses over the narrow Clear Creek.

As it approaches Irving, NY 438 becomes Irving–Gowanda Road, named for the communities at each terminus. The route heads northwest across undeveloped but level terrain, crossing over the New York State Thruway (Interstate 90) without connecting to the highway. NY 438 comes to an end shortly afterward at a junction with US 20 and NY 5 northeast of Irving in the town of Brant. Access to the Thruway is made via exit 58, located a mile (1.6 km) to the southwest on US 20 and NY 5 in Irving, a hamlet in the adjacent Chautauqua County town of Hanover.

The Seneca Nation of Indians, the tribe with jurisdiction over the Cattaraugus Reservation, owns the road on the reservation from 0.68 miles (1.09 km) south of Creek Road and Versailles Plank Road to the northern terminus, but it is maintained by the New York State Department of Transportation. From that point to the reservation line southward, NYSDOT owns and maintains the road. Outside of the reservation, ownership and maintenance of the short stretch of road is divided among three municipalities: Erie County owns and maintains 0.32 miles (0.51 km) as CR 504, followed by 0.27 miles (0.43 km) of road owned and maintained by the town of Collins. The southernmost 0.16 miles (0.26 km) of the route is within the village of Gowanda and is owned and maintained by the village.

== History ==
NY 438 was assigned to the entirety of its current alignment in the mid-1940s. The bridge carrying NY 438 over the New York State Thruway, 61.5 feet (18.7 m) in length, was constructed in 1958. Farther east, the 39-foot (12 m) bridge over Clear Creek was originally built in 1935 and reconstructed in 1992.

== Major intersections ==
The entire route is in Erie County.

Location	mi	km	Destinations	Notes
Gowanda	0.00	0.00	US 62 / NY 39 (Sandhill Road / Buffalo Street) – Buffalo, Jamestown	Southern terminus
Brant	11.78	18.96	US 20 (Southwestern Boulevard) / NY 5 / LECT	Northern terminus
1.000 mi = 1.609 km; 1.000 km = 0.621 mi
