= Jimerson Town, New York =

Planned community in New York, US

Coordinates: 42.15°N 78.77°W

Jimerson Town, locally referred to as Jimtown, (also spelled Jimersontown; Seneca: Jönya:dih, (Note: Sometimes seen as tsyo:nya:tih) literally: "other side of the swale") is a native planned community on the Allegany Indian Reservation within the bounds of Cattaraugus County, New York. Along with Irving on the Cattaraugus Reservation, Jimerson Town is one of two capitals of the Seneca Nation of Indians.

The United States Census Bureau does not recognize the community and no population estimates are available. At the time of its founding in the 1960s, the community was developed with 145 residences, each on one-acre plots. It has been developed with several facilities since the 1980s.

== History ==
According to attorney Charles Congdon's book The Allegany Oxbow, Jimerson Town is a corruption of Jemison Town, as it was originally established by the heirs of Mary Jemison around the time the Allegany Reservation was laid out.

Jimerson Town as it is known today was founded in the 1960s adjacent to the City of Salamanca as a resettlement area for some of the more than 600 Seneca displaced as a result of the Kinzua Dam construction. It was one of two communities built for this purpose, the other being Highbanks, south of Steamburg. Jimerson Town (named after the Jimerson family, a prominent Seneca family in the area) is due west of Salamanca. Old Route 17 runs through the community; from 2016 until a "Slow Down Jimtown" campaign lowered the community's speed limit in 2019, stop signs and speed limit signs were posted in both English and Seneca, with U.S. customary measurements used for both. It historically has been accessible only through Salamanca; the highway leading west of Jimerson Town was closed to traffic in the 1970s. (It was reopened in 2014 after a portion of old Route 17 washed out, stranding several of the westernmost residents; the route west of Jimerson Town remains unmaintained.) Loop roads serve the various residences and infrastructure in the area. The Allegheny Reservoir terminates near the hamlet and runs adjacent to the community as the Allegheny River.

Jimerson Town's proximity to Salamanca and its better infrastructure has given the area a more suburban environment compared to the mostly rural Steamburg area. It became the seat of government for the Allegany Reservation after Red House was evacuated in 1967. Since the mid-1980s, it has developed a volunteer fire department, day-care center, Montessori school, SNI buildings for tribal administration and athletics facilities (the current version of the athletic building, the Allegany Community Center, was built in the early 2010s to replace the original and now-demolished JoJo Redeye Building that served that purpose before). Through traffic was discontinued in the 1970s. This was in part because the Seneca Nation wanted to discourage outsiders (at the time of Jimerson Town's founding, the nation had a problem with tourists exploring the new community); other factors for converting Jimerson Town into a cul-de-sac included the reservoir's tendency to flood the roadway west of Jimerson Town, endangering traffic, and an effort to cut Red House (the next community to the southwest of Jimerson Town along old Route 17) off from the highway system and force its few remaining residents to move elsewhere so that that town's land could be claimed for expanding Route 17 and Allegany State Park. Through traffic was restored in 2024 after a bridge in Red House was replaced, with the roadway converted to a gravel limited-use road to deter unnecessary usage.

The Seneca also have several facilities in Salamanca: the Seneca-Iroquois National Museum, the Allegany branch of the SNI library, a Seneca-owned bowling alley (the bowling alley was repurposed as a bingo hall in 1987) and two craft shops, and a restaurant featuring Seneca cuisine. The Seneca Allegany Casino opened just south of Jimerson Town in 2004.

Two churches operate in Jimerson Town: a Presbyterian missionary church and the nondenominational Red House Memorial Chapel, the latter of which is a church that moved from Red House to Jimerson Town in 1967, forcibly and against their will.

In 2017, the Allegany Council House was added to the National Register of Historic Places.
