= Seneca Nation of Indians =

Federally recognized Native American tribe

Seneca Nation of Indians Onödowá’ga:’ (Seneca)
- Capital: Irving, New York; Jimerson Town, New York (rotating)
- Largest city: Salamanca, New York
- Official languages: Seneca (national); English (national)
- Government: Republic
  - President: Tina Abrams
  - Treasurer: Lenith Waterman
  - Clerk: Bethany Johnson

Population
  - 2010 estimate: 8,000
- Time zone: EST
- Seneca Nation of New York official website

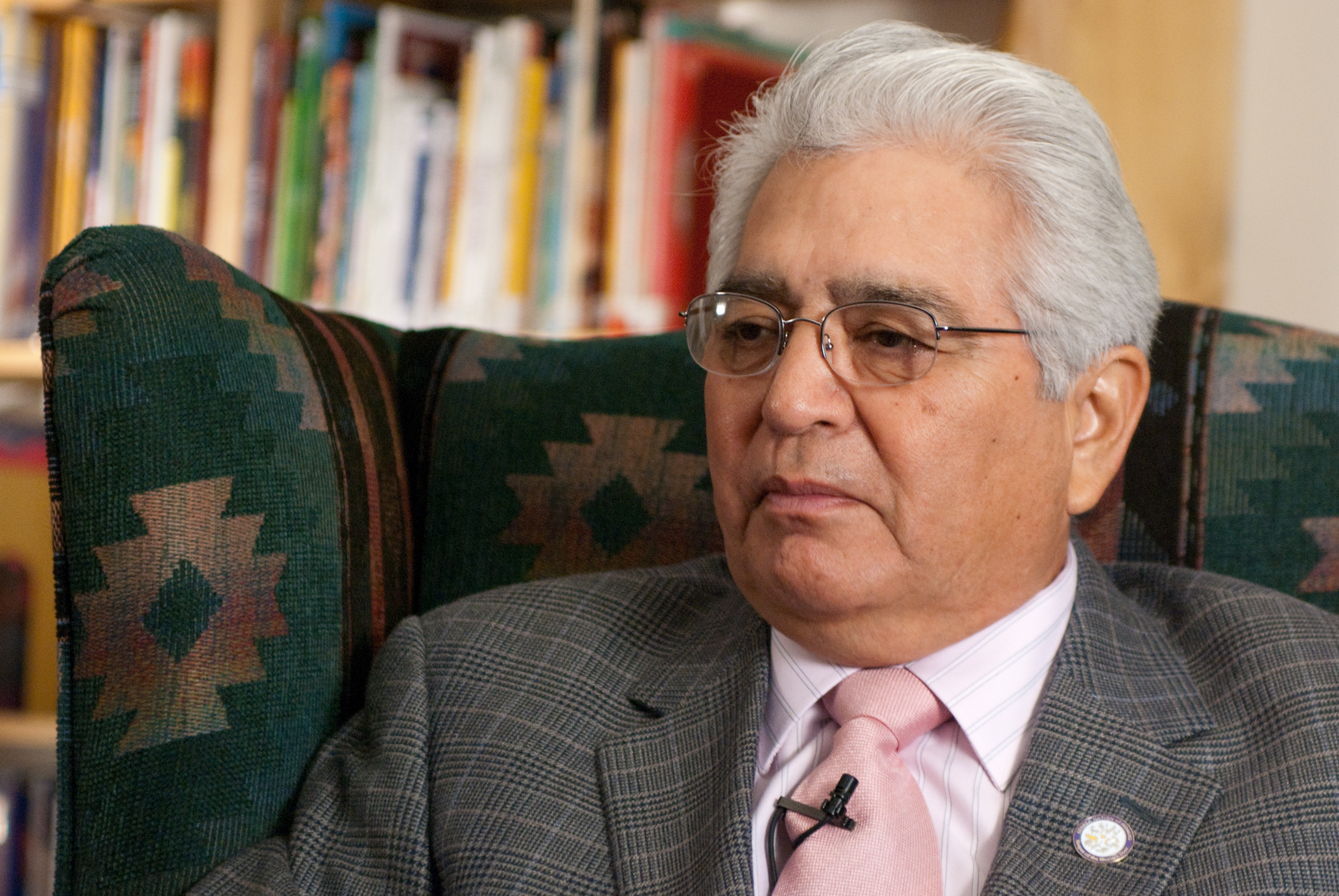
Seneca President Barry Snyder in 2009

The Seneca Nation of Indians is a federally recognized Seneca tribe based in western New York. They are one of three federally recognized Seneca entities in the United States, the others being the Tonawanda Band of Seneca (also in western New York) and the Seneca-Cayuga Nation of Oklahoma. Some Seneca also live with other Haudenosaunee peoples on the Six Nations of the Grand River in Ontario.

The Seneca Nation has three reservations, two of which are occupied: Cattaraugus Reservation, Allegany Indian Reservation, and the mostly unpopulated Oil Springs Reservation. It has two alternating capitals on the two occupied reservations: Irving at Cattaraugus Reservation, and Jimerson Town near Salamanca on the Allegany Reservation. The tribe also claims sovereignty over a portion of the Canawaugus settlement as of 2022, which is not federally recognized. An additional territory de facto governed by the nation, the Cornplanter Tract in Pennsylvania, officially expired in 1957 and was submerged by the construction of the Allegheny Reservoir in 1965.

== Government ==
In 1848, Seneca Indians residing on the Allegany and Cattaraugus Territories in New York established this government through a constitutional convention. The Seneca Nation of Indians Constitution established a tri-partite governing structure based on general elections of 16 Councilors, three Executives (President, Treasurer, and Clerk), and Court Justices (Surrogates and Peacemakers). Elections take place every two years, on the first Tuesday in November, usually concurrent with Election Day in the United States. An exception is in years when November 1 is a Tuesday; in those years, the Seneca Nation hold their election on November 1 while the US hold their elections on November 8. The leadership rotates between the two reservations each election, so no officer can serve consecutive terms. There are no other term limits, and elected officers can serve numerous nonconsecutive terms.

The Council established rules for citizenship within the nation. In the 21st century, the Seneca Nation of Indians in New York has a total enrolled population of nearly 8,000 citizens.

Its territories are mostly rural with several residential areas. Many Seneca citizens live off-territory, and some are located across the United States, as well as in other countries. Off-territory residents, who often work in remote urban areas that provide more jobs, comprise nearly half of the enrolled citizens. These off-territory members are eligible to vote and are often bussed in during elections.

The Seneca Nation's republican form of government stands in contrast to that of the Tonawanda Seneca Nation. The Tonawanda Seneca Nation retained its traditional government of hereditary chiefs chosen by clan mothers from the maternal lines responsible for such leadership. The Seneca Nation of New York deposed such hereditary leaders in the 1848 convention. Followers of the traditional government structure split off and organized the Tonawanda Band, who later also gained federal recognition.

The Seneca Nation government denied women the right to vote until the early 1960s; this despite the traditional pre-republic structure in which women were granted the right to choose chiefs. The nation's male voters rejected female suffrage in three consecutive referendums in the 1950s, all rejected with widespread opposition from the Allegany Reservation, before the referendum finally passed in 1964, with women granted the right to hold office in 1966.

In July 2024, Seneca Nation citizens voted against creating a tribal police department.

=== Politics ===
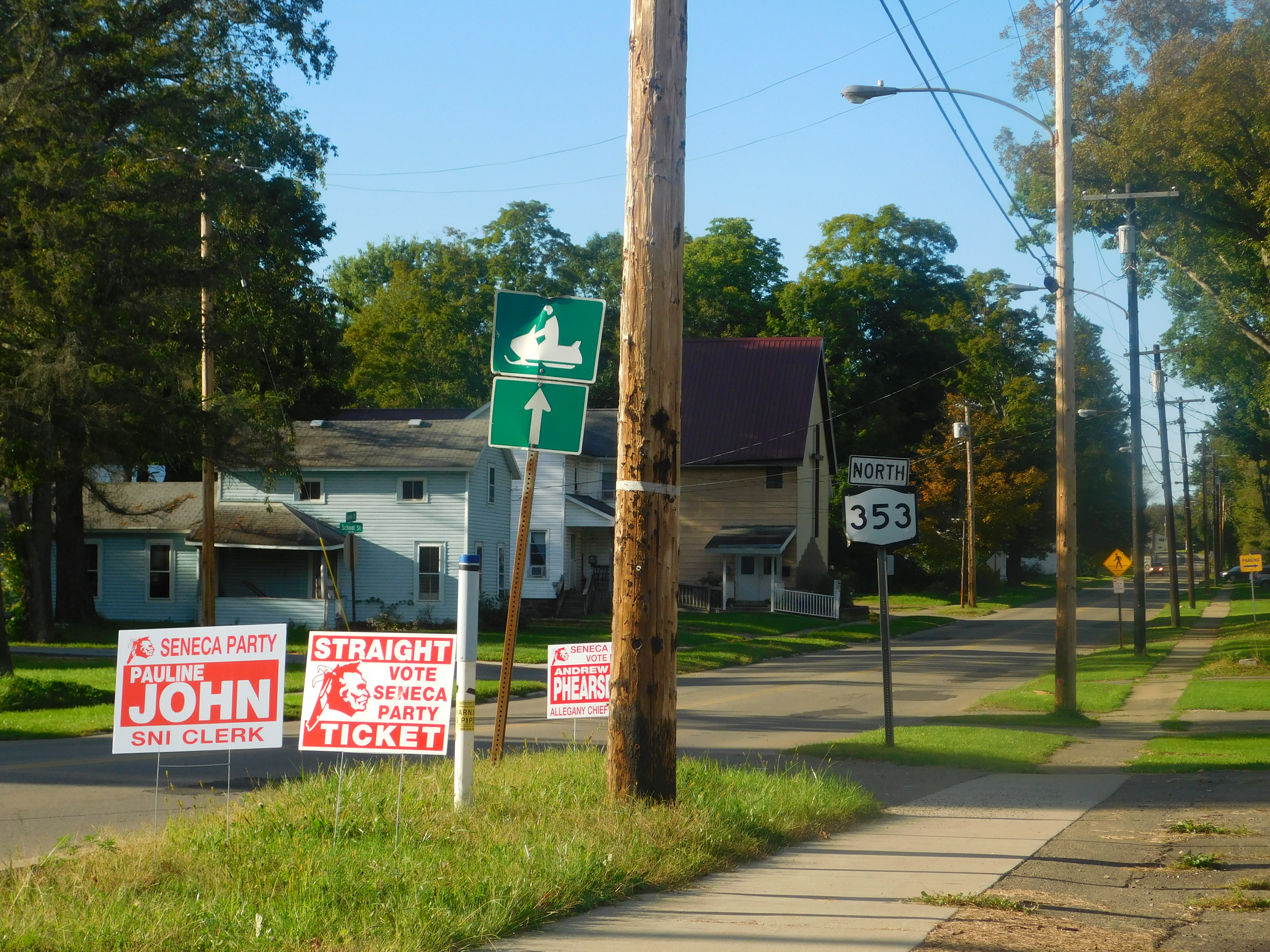
Several election signs posted by the Seneca Party. The middle sign advertises the party's endorsement of straight-ticket voting.

Since the late 20th century, the Seneca government is reported to be primarily under de-facto one-party rule, with the Seneca Party having control of the political process. In 2011, the Seneca Party was reported by The Buffalo News as having bribed people for votes and bussed voters in from out of state during elections. The party also controls human resources management in the nation's various enterprises, allowing them to hire people for patronage jobs and fire people for political dissent. Opposing political parties have accused the party of electoral malfeasance through violating the secret ballot.

According to J.C. Seneca, a former Seneca Party politician who defected from the party in 2014, the ruling class has ensured that only the Seneca Party has had enough candidates to qualify for straight-ticket voting in which voters can select all of a party's candidates for office with a single ballot mark by intimidating candidates from other parties out of the race, and on election day, poll workers eavesdrop upon voters by timing how long it takes to cast a ballot. In years past, the nation has used lever-action voting machines, a process that will be replaced as of 2016 by scanned paper ballots, If a poll worker heard a voter depress more than one lever, or take too long to complete their ballot, they could report this back to the Seneca Party bosses, who could then punish the voter by denying them jobs or seizing their homes. There have been numerous factions and disputes within the Seneca Party; tensions increased during the presidency of attorney Robert Odawi Porter in 2010–2012. Supporters of Porter were at odds with supporters of the John family, an old-line, politically powerful family in Seneca circles. In the years following Porter's lone term, the disputes have mostly been settled.

In November 2011, the John family led a vote to depose Porter by stripping him of most of his powers and give the title of chief executive officer to Michael "Spike" John. He is the cousin of Maurice "Moe" John, who served as Seneca president from 2006 to 2008, and ran unsuccessfully for Seneca President against Porter in 2010. Diane Kennedy, Tribal Clerk and a Porter ally, invalidated this vote under conflict of interest statutes. In an October 2012 Council Session, a close friend of Kennedy said that Porter wrote the invalidation letter for Kennedy to sign. The action for de facto impeachment was taken after John supporters said politically motivated charges were made against Susan Abrams, a John ally.

The 2012 elections were marked by a split in the Seneca Party and one of the most wide-open (and bitterly contested) Seneca elections in several years: five candidates competed for the post of president, including two endorsed by the two major factions in the Seneca Party. Barry E. Snyder Sr., a John ally who had previously served several other terms as President (including the one immediately before Porter), was re-elected to the post in 2012.

On November 4, 2014, with 66 percent of the vote, Maurice "Moe" John of the Seneca Party was elected to serve as President of the Seneca Nation of Indians. John faced council member Darlene Miller, who ran on the One Nation Party ticket. The Seneca Party had a landslide victory in the 2014 Elections; Todd Gates was elected Treasurer, and Pauline "Snap" John was elected Clerk. Elected to the Council were Ross L. John Sr., Llona LeRoy, outgoing President Barry Snyder, John Adlai Williams Jr., all of the Cattaraugus Territory. Tina Abrams, Rickey Armstrong, William "Billy" Canella and Stephen Gordon were elected to the Council from the Allegany Territory.

The Seneca Party nominated then Treasurer/CFO, Todd Gates, as its nominee for President in September 2016, spurning Barry Snyder's efforts at a sixth term; Snyder, a supporter of the party machine, endorsed Gates, who faced challengers J.C. Seneca and Sally Snow. The Seneca Nation elections took place on November 1, 2016. Gates defeated candidates J.C. Seneca and Sally Snow for President. Outgoing President Maurice "Moe" John was elected Treasurer, Lenith Waterman was elected Clerk. Elected to Council were Linda "Soupy" Doxtator, Jeffrey Gill, Arlene Bova Michael Williams, Presley Redeye, Keith White, Al E. George and Timothy Waterman.

In the 2018 Seneca Nation elections, Rickey L. Armstrong Sr., a Nation Councilor since 2014 and a past Seneca Nation President from 2002–2004, received the Seneca Party nomination for President along with Matthew Pagels for Treasurer, and Bethany Johnson for Clerk. Armstrong defeated independent candidate Stephen L. Maybee with over 89% of the vote in the November 6th, 2018 general election. The Seneca Party won all Seneca Nation offices, Councilors elected were Tina Abrams, William Canella, Josh Jimerson, Angie Kennedy, Llona LeRoy, Robert W. Jones, Ross John Sr., and John Adlai Williams Jr. Andrew Keyes and Brandon Crouse were elected Chief Marshals; Darby LeRoy, Cheyne Jimerson, Rory Wheeler, Josh Becker, Christopher Bova, and Randy White were elected Marshals.

The 2020 Seneca Nation election featured a across the board sweep by the Seneca Party, who endorsed Matthew Pagels for President, Rickey Armstrong Sr., for Treasurer, and Marta Kettle for Clerk. They defeated the Senecas for Change 2020 ticket led by presidential candidate and businesswoman Sally Snow, newcomer treasurer candidate Karen Johnson Veeraswamy, clerk candidate and former court of appeals judge Julie Snow, and Independent treasurer candidate Stephen Maybee. Elected to the council from the Allegany Territory were longtime council members Al E. George, Arlene Bova, outgoing marshal Josh Becker, and former Seneca Nation Health System president/chief executive officer, Tim Waterman. Councilors elected from the Cattaraugus Territory were the Seneca’s environmental director, Lisa Maybee, current councilor and fire chief of the Nation’s volunteer fire department, Presley Redeye, deputy chief of staff to the treasurer, Eliot “Chub” Jimerson, current councilor and former chief marshal, Keith White.

In 2024, the aforementioned J.C. Seneca reconciled with the Seneca Party and received its nomination for President as part of its slate of candidates. The 2024 Seneca Nation election resulted in significant changes to the leadership of the Seneca Nation, with a strong showing of support for Cattaraugus Councilor J.C. Seneca, who defeated independent challenger Mike General in a decisive victory for Seneca Nation President. Seneca secured 87% of the vote, marking a resounding mandate from voters.

Outgoing Allegany Councilor Al E. George was elected Treasurer, bringing his experience to the role after serving on the Council. Additionally, former two-time Clerk Lenith Waterman returned to office, regaining the position as Clerk of the Seneca Nation.

The Seneca Nation Council saw several familiar faces returning to leadership roles. From the Allegany Territory, the Council included Rickey L. Armstrong, Sr., the outgoing president of the Seneca Nation, who was re-elected to the Council, Kevin W. Seneca, a former Nation Treasurer and Chairman of the Seneca Gaming Corporation, who returned to Council, Christian Reiller, and Josh Becker. From the Cattaraugus Territory, the newly elected Council members included Klint Nephew, Eliot Jimerson, Lisa Maybee, and Jonathan D. Williams. With Seneca’s election to President, his seat on the Cattaraugus Territory Council became vacant. To fill the remainder of his term, former Nation President and Treasurer Todd Gates was appointed to the Cattaraugus Council.

In the 2026 Seneca Party caucuses, Tina Abrams won the party's nomination for President over former President Rickey Armstrong and Odie Porter, the wife of former President Robert Porter; Abrams defeated independent challengers Justin "Baconator" Kennison and Seneca Ray in the general election and was sworn in as the first woman president in Seneca Nation history.

== Economy ==
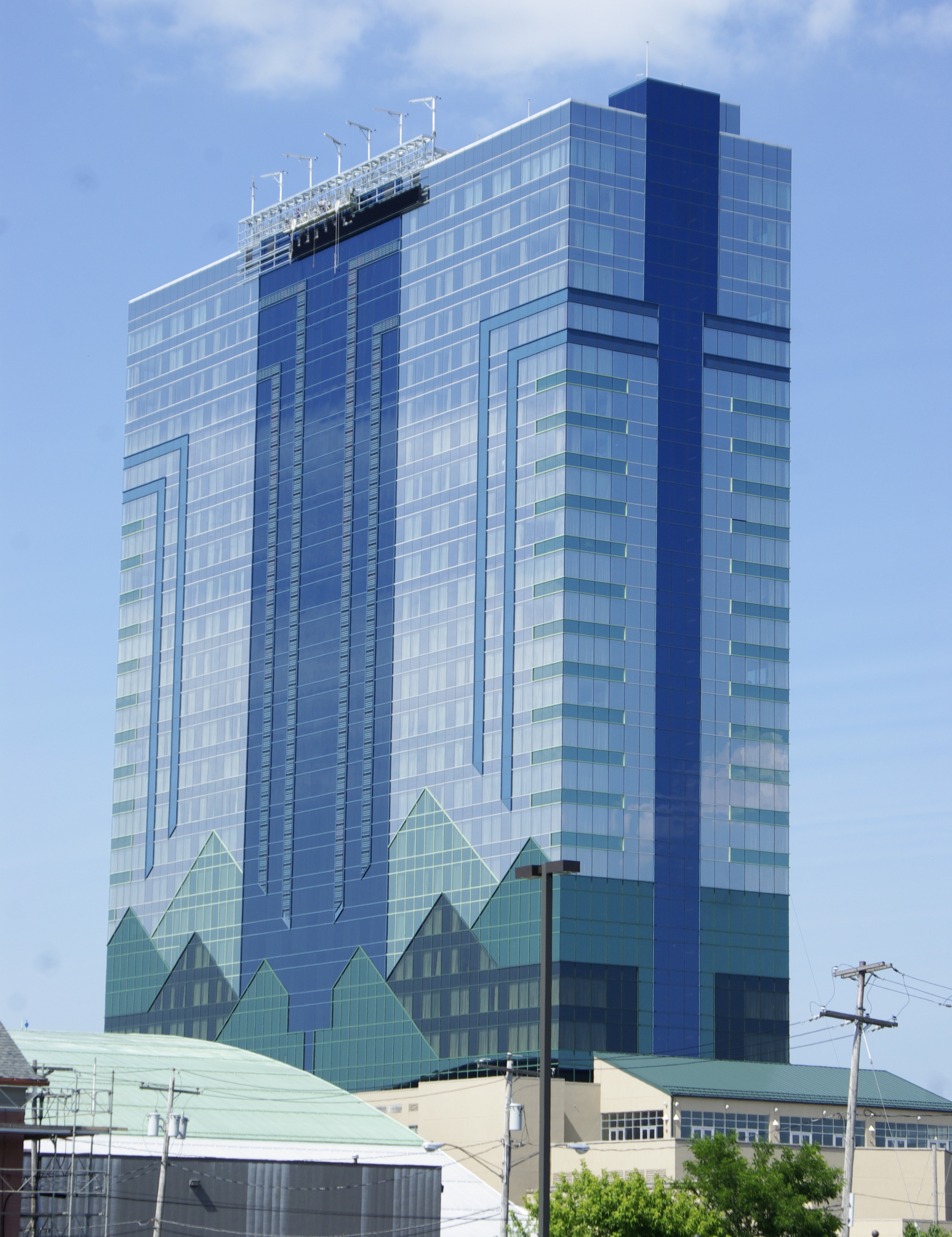
The Seneca Niagara Casino & Hotel

=== Overview ===
The Seneca have a diversified economy that relies on construction, communications, recreation, tourism, and retail sales. They have recently started operating two tribal-owned gaming casinos and recreation complexes.

Several large construction companies are located on the Cattaraugus and Allegany Territories. Many smaller construction companies are owned and operated by Seneca people. A considerable number of Seneca men work in some facet of the construction industry.

Recreation is one component of Seneca enterprises. The Highbanks Campground (reopened May 2015 after being closed in 2013) plays host to visitors in summer, as people take in the scenic vistas and enjoy the Allegheny Reservoir. Several thousand fishing licenses are sold each year to non-Seneca fishermen. Many of these customers are tourists to the region. Several major highways adjacent to or on the Seneca Nation Territories provide ready accessibility to local, regional and national traffic. Many tourists visit the region during the autumn for the fall foliage.

The tribe owns and operates the Seneca Buffalo Creek Casino, located in Buffalo. Other gaming and resort properties include the Seneca Allegany Casino in Salamanca and Seneca Niagara Casino in Niagara Falls. The Seneca Nation also owns Seneca Gaming and Entertainment, a chain of small video slots and bingo facilities with locations in Irving, Salamanca, and on the Oil Spring Reservation in Cuba, New York.

Through a tribal-owned holding company, the tribe owns a telecommunications firm, Seneca Telecommunications; and a construction management company, SCMC LLC. Under the presidency of Robert Odawi Porter, the tribe began pursuing diversification of the Nation's businesses. It promoted founding of new Seneca-owned businesses beyond the Nation's traditional strongholds of gasoline retail and tobacco products. In 2010 the tribe acquired a controlling interest in wireless and telecommunications provider CT COMM, based in Washington, D.C. From 2010 to 2021, Seneca Holding also owned and operated Seneca Broadcasting LLC, which operated radio station WGWE. The Seneca Nation sold WGWE to Paul Izard shortly after shutting the station down but failed to disclose problems with the station's transmitter or terms in WGWE's broadcast tower lease, prompting Izard to quickly donate the station to Family Life Network and accuse the Seneca Nation and the tower owner of malfeasance.

A substantial portion of the Seneca economy revolves around retail sales. From gas stations, smokeshops, and sports apparel, candles and artwork to traditional crafts, the wide range of products for sale on Seneca Nation Territories reflect the diverse interests of Seneca Nation citizens. The tribe has developed a brand of cigarettes called Native Pride. The tribe also owns a small chain of smoke shops and gas stations under the "Seneca One Stop" brand, but the vast majority of smoke shops on Seneca reservations are independently owned. Seneca-owned businesses operated on sovereign land are exempt from New York state excise taxes, giving them a price advantage over off-territory businesses, as well as on-territory businesses operated by non-Seneca. Issues related to these excise taxes have been a source of controversy between the tribes and the state government and non-Seneca convenience store operators in the vicinity for several decades.

In August of 2025, the Seneca Nation announced they had acquired National Lacrosse League team Rochester Knighthawks, through Seneca Holdings LLC.

=== Seneca Medical Marijuana Initiative ===
According to Bill Wagner, an author writing for High Times, "Members of the Seneca Nation of Indians in western New York state voted up a referendum Nov. 3 (2016) giving tribal leaders approval to move towards setting up a medical marijuana business on their territories. The measure passed by a vote of 448-364, giving the Seneca Nation Council the power to draft laws and regulations allowing the manufacture, use and distribution of cannabis for medical purposes. "A decision on our Nation's path of action on medical cannabis is far from made", cautioned Seneca President Maurice A. John Sr. in comments to the Buffalo News. "But now, having heard from the Seneca people, our discussions and due diligence can begin in earnest."" Entering the marijuana industry is thought to help stimulate the economy of the Seneca Nation and create local business, dispensaries and other types of jobs involving medical marijuana.

=== Tax-free gasoline and cigarette sales ===
The price advantage of the Senecas' ability to sell tax-free gasoline and cigarettes has created a boom in their economy. They have established many service stations along the state highways that run through the reservations, as well as many internet cigarette stores. Competing business interests and the state government object to their sales over the Internet. The state of New York believes that the tribe's sales of cigarettes by Internet are illegal. It also believes that the state has the authority to tax non-Indians who patronize Seneca businesses, a principle which the Seneca reject.

Seneca President Barry Snyder has defended the price advantage as an issue of sovereignty. Secondly, he has cited the Treaty of Canandaigua and Treaty of Buffalo Creek as the basis of Seneca exemption from collecting taxes on cigarettes to pay the state.

The Appellate Division of the New York Supreme Court, Third Department had rejected this conclusion in 1994. The court held that the provisions of the treaty regarding taxation was only with regard to property taxes. The New York Court of Appeals on December 1, 1994, affirmed the lower court's decision.

The Seneca have refused to extend these benefits and price advantages to non-Indians, and in their own words, "[have] little sympathy for outsiders" who desire to do so. They have tried to prosecute non-Indians who have attempted to claim the price advantages of the Seneca while operating a business on the reservation. Little Valley businessman Lloyd Long operated two Uni-Marts on the reservation which were owned by a Seneca woman. He was arrested after investigation by federal authorities at the behest of the Seneca Nation accusing the native woman of being a front for Long. In 2011 he was ordered by the court to pay more than one million dollars in restitution and serve five years on probation.

In 1997, New York State had attempted to enforce taxation on reservation sales of gasoline and cigarettes to non-Indians. Numerous Seneca had protested by setting fire to tires and cutting off traffic to Interstate 90 and New York State Route 17 (the future Interstate 86). Then Attorney General Eliot Spitzer attempted to cut off the Seneca Tribe's internet cigarette sales by way of financial deplatforming. His office negotiated directly with credit card companies, tobacco companies, and delivery services to try to gain agreement to reject handling Seneca cigarette purchases by consumers. Another attempt at collecting taxes on gasoline and cigarettes sold to non-Indians was set to begin March 1, 2006; but it was tabled by the State Department of Taxation and Finance.

Shortly after March 1, 2006, other parties began proceedings to compel the State of New York to enforce its tax laws on sales to non-Indians on Indian land. Seneca County filed a suit which was dismissed. The New York State Association of Convenience Stores filed a similar suit, which was also dismissed. Based on the dismissal of these proceedings, Daniel Warren, a member and officer of Upstate Citizens for Equality, moved to vacate the judgment dismissing his 2002 state court action. The latter was dismissed because the court ruled that he had lack of standing.

In response to Governor Eliot Spitzer's inclusion of $200 million of revenue in his budget from the cigarette tax, the Seneca announced plans to collect a toll from all who travel the length of I-90 that goes through their reservation. In 2007 the Senecas rescinded the agreement that had permitted construction of the thruway and its attendant easement through their reservation. Some commentators have contended that this agreement was not necessary or moot because the United States was already granted free right-of-passage across the Seneca land in the Treaty of Canandaigua.

In 2008 Governor David Paterson included $62 million of revenue in his budget from the proposed collection of these taxes. He signed a new law requiring that manufacturers and wholesalers swear under penalty of perjury that they are not selling untaxed cigarettes in New York.

A law to bar any tax-exempt organization in New York from receiving tax-free cigarettes went into effect June 21, 2011. The Seneca nation has repeatedly appealed the decision, continuing to do so as of June 2011, but has not gained an overturn of this law. The state has enforced the law only on cigarette brands produced by non-Indian companies (including all major national brands). It has not attempted to collect taxes on brands that are entirely tribally produced and sold (these are generally lower-end and lower-cost brands that have always made up the majority of Seneca cigarette sales.)

=== Casinos ===
As states struggled to raise revenues, in the 1980s, some state legislatures prohibited state-sponsored gambling by authorizing state lotteries and other games of chance as a means to raise funds. In some cases, funds from such operations were earmarked for education or other worthy goals. Native American tribes asserted their right to run similar activities. With the US Supreme Court decision ruling in the late 1980s that federally recognized Native American tribes could establish gaming on their sovereign reservations, the Seneca Nation began to develop its gambling industry. It began, as states and other tribes did, with bingo.

In 2002, the Seneca Nation of Indians signed a Gaming Compact with the State of New York to cooperate in the establishment of three class III gambling facilities (casinos). It established the Seneca Gaming Corporation to manage its operations. The Seneca Nation of Indians owns and operates two casinos on its territory in New York State: one in Niagara Falls called Seneca Niagara which also reopened in online format during the pandemic and the other in Salamanca, called Seneca Allegany.

Construction began on a third, the Seneca Buffalo Creek Casino, in downtown Buffalo. In 2007 the Seneca opened a temporary casino on its land in Buffalo after federal approval, to satisfy its agreement with the state, and moved to a permanent building in 2013. Some citizens have opposed all Indian gambling, but especially the Buffalo location. Additional controversy has been engendered because there were questions about whether the Seneca-controlled land met other status criteria for gambling as defined in the IGRA.

Some civic groups, including a "broad coalition of Buffalo's political, business, and cultural leaders", have opposed the Seneca Nation's establishment of a casino in Buffalo. They believe the operations will adversely affect the economic and social environment of the already struggling city. Opponents include the Upstate Citizens for Equality and Citizens for a Better Buffalo. In 2008 they won a lawsuit challenging the legality of the proposed casino in Buffalo, because of the status of the land. It was not part of their original reservations but had been transferred in a settlement with the state.

On July 8, 2008, United States District Judge William M. Skretny issued a decision holding that the Seneca Buffalo Creek Casino is not on gaming-eligible lands. The National Indian Gaming Commission is reviewing proposed Seneca regulations and weighing its appeal options. The Seneca were given five days to respond or to face fines and a forced shutdown. They said they refuse to comply with the commission's order and will appeal.

Given the economic situation during the Great Recession, in summer 2008 the Seneca paused construction on the new casino in Buffalo. In December 2008 they laid off 210 employees from the three casinos.

=== Broadcasting ===
The nation has established an official broadcasting arm, "Seneca Broadcasting", to apply for and purchase radio station licenses. The company owned one commercial FM radio station (broadcasting at 105.9 MHz) licensed off-reservation to the village of Little Valley, which the company purchased from Randy Michaels in early 2009. That station, known as WGWE, signed on February 1, 2010, from studios in the city of Salamanca with a classic hits format and was owned and operated by the nation until its sale in December 2021. An earlier application, for a noncommercial FM station at 89.3 in Irving, New York, ran into mutual exclusivity problems with out-of-town religious broadcasters.

=== Seneca Pumped Storage Project at Kinzua Dam ===
For decades, the Seneca developed their land primarily for agricultural and related uses. The floodplain along the river was highly fertile. In the 1960s, members of the tribe became increasingly politically active. This was related to asserting sovereignty as part of a general Native American activism in this period and, specifically, to try to defeat proposals by the United States Army Corps of Engineers to take thousands of acres of reservation land as part of construction of Kinzua Dam, a flood-control project on the river.

While alternatives existed, the federal government's study concluded that these were not viable. The COE proceeded with the project: construction of the dam and associated reservoir. The project caused huge losses for the tribe, taking 10,000 acres of their reservation, nearly one third of their total property and much of it the most fertile farmland. More than 600 families were displaced from their homes and relocated. The tribe received a few hundred acres and relocation assistance for these families, as well as the relocation of a burial ground. That this compensation was largely considered insufficient was made worse by the fact that the government' violated a 1794 treaty- that guaranteed the tribe control of this reservation- in order to accomplish the building of the dam. In addition, the Kinzua damn project has since caused other flooding on their land and a through road, causing the loss of additional fertile areas.

In the aftermath of the dam's completion, the Seneca people developed a different political dynamic. As the tribe used some compensation monies to support higher education for its members, the 1960s crisis indirectly resulted in a "college-educated generation, some of whom now work in tribal government making major contributions to the nation’s present and future."

In a major action, in 2010 the Nation filed an application with the Federal Energy Regulatory Commission (FERC) to take over operations of the hydropower works, the Seneca Pumped Storage Project at Kinzua Dam. Robert Odawi Porter, president of the tribe, said this would not only help the tribe to diversify its economy, but be a means of compensation for environmental and property losses that accompanied flooding of 10,000 acres of tribal areas after the dam was constructed in 1965. The operator at the time, FirstEnergy of Toledo, Ohio, had a license that was set to expire in 2015. The private sector is estimated to have been making $13 million in profits annually from the hydropower.

President Porter has noted that, when the federal dam was proposed, tribal leaders were told only that it was needed for flood control, not that a hydroelectric project would be run there. In August 2011, the tribe received a preliminary permit from FERC to study "the feasibility of the additional hydropower operations and [it] grants them priority status in filing for the full permit." The Nation was required to work with the U.S. Army Corps of Engineers to obtain documents relevant to adding new generation infrastructure to its dam.

In November 2013, FERC approved FirstEnergy's sale of 11 hydro plants, including that at Kinzua Dam, which was the biggest project, to a unit of independent developer LS Power Group. This did not affect any transfers of operating licenses, which FERC noted were pending separate approvals.

President Porter noted that the dam has generated hundreds of millions of dollars in profits for operators since it started in 1970, but the Seneca have not received any of that money. It also noted that the federal government had licensed the private hydropower project to use the Allegheny Reservoir, but no operator had ever obtained property rights from the Seneca Nation for operation of the dam.

On July 22, 2015, the Commission issued a new 50-year license to Seneca Generation to continue operation of the Kinzua Project, effective December 1, 2015. That year, Seneca Generation sought relief from requirements by federal resource agencies related to measures to protect rare and endangered species below the dam. FERC denied a rehearing and stay requested by the company.

=== Transit service ===
In 2013, the Seneca launched a public transit bus service to serve both the Cattaraugus and the western portion of the Allegany reservations; it operates one route, running along NY 438, NY 353, Old Route 17, I-86 and West Perimeter Road between Irving and Highbanks. The service is open to non-Seneca along the route.

=== Employment ===
Many Seneca people are employed in the local economy of the region as professionals, including lawyers, professors, physicians, police officers, teachers, social workers, nurses, and managers.

== Relationship with non-Seneca ==
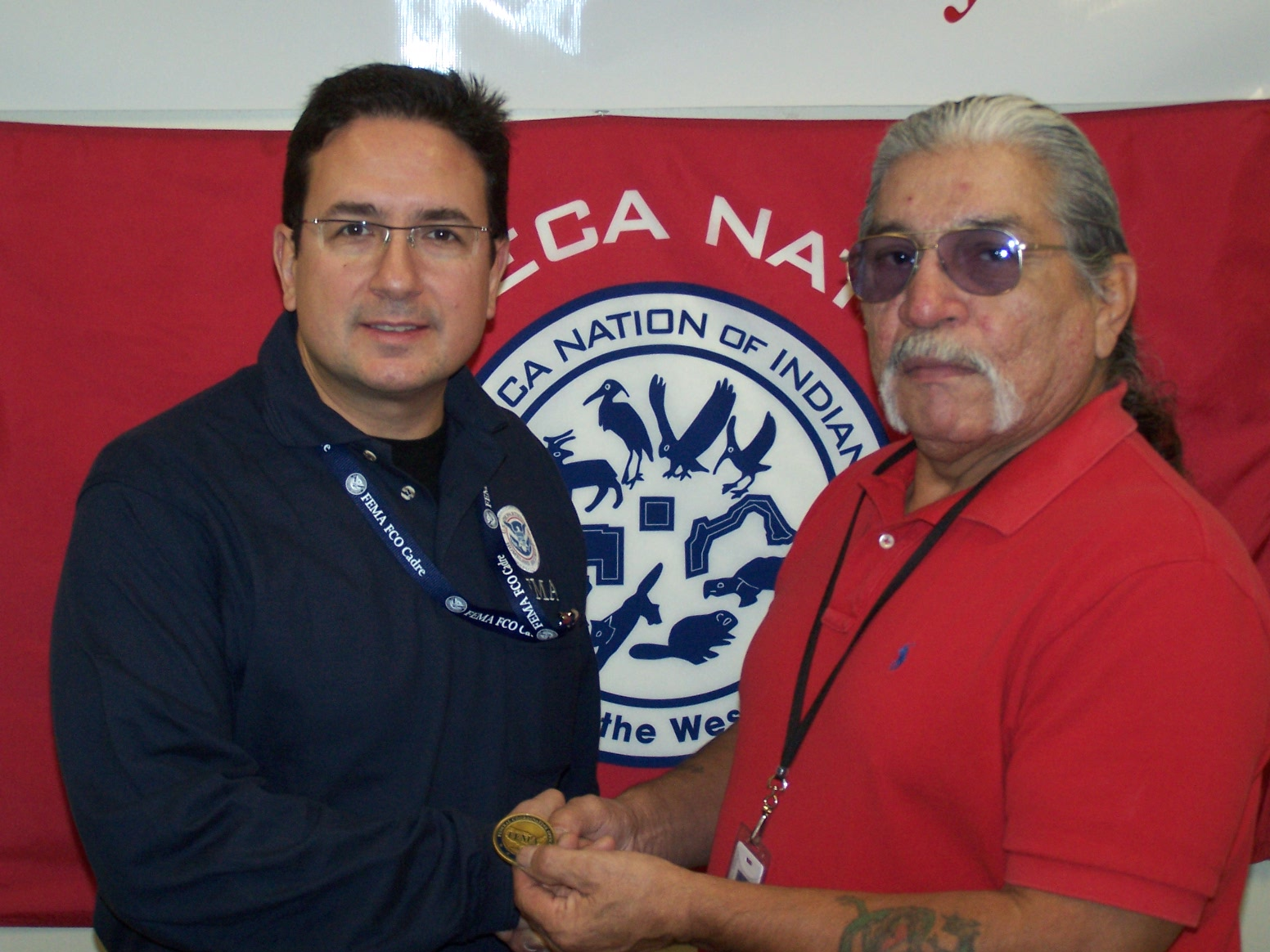
Federal Emergency Management Agency (FEMA) officer presents an award to Art John, Director of Emergency Response for the Seneca Nation of Indians, 2009

Mary Jemison was the daughter of an Irish family who had settled in Pennsylvania. She was taken prisoner by the Shawnee during the French and Indian War. Historical accounts recorded by Dr. James Seaver indicate that Jemison was adopted by a Seneca tribe and became assimilated. In her lifetime she married two Seneca men, and raised their children in the Seneca culture. She was known to act as a liaison between her adopted Seneca Nation and the Old World-American settlers, particularly in regards to treaty agreements.

In 1995, the Seneca Nation of Indians sent a trade mission to Egypt in hopes of encouraging trade between the Haudenosaunee nation and the northeast African country. Seneca leaders also meet with OAPEC representatives to discuss a possible trade deal whereby the nation would trade agricultural commodities for Egyptian refined gasoline.

The nation claims authority to banish non-Seneca individuals from tribal lands; it has historically used this power in only rare circumstances, such as a December 2016 incident in which six non-natives were banished from the nation's territories, two of whom were banned for traffic violations and the other four for drug possession.

== Exercising sovereignty over reservation lands ==
Since the later 20th century, the Seneca have been increasingly active in exercising sovereignty on their reservation and enforcing their property rights. In the 1990s, the Seneca won a prolonged court battle to assume ownership of all land on their reservation, including that owned by private non-Seneca. (This was particularly contentious in Salamanca, where non-Native land ownership had been tolerated for decades. State and local officials said that this is the only United States city located on Indian reservation land; under the recognized law of the time, the underlying land remained Seneca owned, but "improvements" on that land were not subject to lease and were still privately owned.) The city had been developed under a 99-year federal lease arrangement with the Seneca Nation. It had provided land to railroads to encourage development, which the railroad developed for workers and their families, and related businesses. This arrangement was confirmed by acts of Congress in 1875, 1890 and 1990.

When that lease expired in 1991, the Seneca Nation demanded that the previous owners sign new leases with their nation for not only the underlying land, but also the improvements as well, or be evicted. The Seneca evicted fifteen property owners from their homes for refusing to sign over their properties. The increase in lease revenue from this reinterpretation has generated sufficient revenue for the nation to pay its enrolled members a quarterly social dividend, providing those members with a basic income.

In a similar case in 2012, the Seneca ordered an eviction of 80 residents of summer cottages at Snyder Beach on the Cattaraugus Reservation, a location near Sunset Bay. They had previously notified the owner of the land that his leases to non-Seneca were not permissible, but he had done nothing to clear his property. Some of the residents were from families who had rented there for decades. The Seneca described the non-Natives as constituting a long-standing "illegal occupation".

== Culture ==
Members of the Allegany Seneca Dancers, a group which performs traditional dances of the Seneca Nation.

The Seneca were the largest of the six Native American nations that comprised the Haudenosaunee ("Iroquois") Confederacy, or Six Nations. Their democratic government pre-dates the United States Constitution.

In the Haudenosaunee Confederacy, the Seneca are known as the "Keepers of the Western Door," for they are the westernmost of the Six Nations. In the Seneca language they are called Onödowaʼga꞉ʼ (pronounced: Oh-n'own-dough-wahgah) or "Great Hill People." At the time of the formation of the Haudenosaunee League, the original five nations occupied large areas of land in Northeast North America, particularly present-day New York, Pennsylvania, and Southeast Canada. The historical territory of the Seneca Nation ran throughout the Finger Lakes area in Central New York and the Genesee Valley in Western New York. The Seneca lived in longhouses near rivers, and their villages were well fortified with wooden-stake palisade fences.

These were settled communities in which the people cultivated the Three Sisters staple crops: varieties of maize, beans, and squash. In Seneca the Three Sisters are also called Jöhéhgöh (pronounced: Jo- hay- ko), "the life supporters." Generally women cultivated and processed the crops, maintaining seed crops and experimenting with varieties, and men were subsistence hunters and fishers.

The Seneca were highly skilled at warfare, and were considered fierce adversaries by other Native Americans and European colonists. But the Seneca were also renowned for their sophisticated diplomacy and oratory skills, and their willingness to unite with the other four of the original Five Nations to form the Haudenosaunee Confederacy of Nations.

Today the Seneca Nation sustains its own people. Its enterprises benefit surrounding communities with a variety of cultural, educational and economic efforts. Its varied enterprises include: world-class casino gaming, hospitality and entertainment, which employ over 3,500 people; a convenience store chain (four stores), construction management, and diverse holdings in business ventures.

Seneca language, song, art, dance, and sports are all vital expressions of their culture. The number of fluent Seneca language speakers is diminishing due to the deaths of elders, and the language is considered at-risk. The Nation has established language programs to help protect, preserve and develop a new generation of Seneca-language speakers to keep the language alive.

Lacrosse is a sport played by male and female, young and old. Two new community sports complexes on each territory enable year-round lacrosse leagues and space for community programs, crafts and learning. Like other Haudenosaunee nations, Seneca Nation lacrosse players compete internationally on the Haudenosaunee Nationals squads, organized by the First Nations Lacrosse Association, which competes on par with fully sovereign nations such as the U.S. and Canada in international competition.

A Faithkeepers' School supports and ensures the ongoing practice of traditional teachings, arts, knowledge and the living culture of the Longhouse ways. Seneca heritage is evident in the ceremonies, practices, and cultural events that are infused with dance, music and song, arts, crafts and traditional foods that honor and celebrate Seneca culture.

== Notable Seneca citizens ==
- Tina Abrams, Nation president, co-chair of council, first woman in both roles
- Governor Blacksnake (c.1740–1859), Seneca war chief, super-centenarian and savior of the Wenro Oil Spring
- Cornplanter, (1750–1836), a Seneca of Dutch paternal descent (he used both the Seneca name Gaiantwake, which he received from his mother, and the European name John Abeel, from his father Johannes, grandson of former mayor of Albany Johannes Abeel), resided in what is now the Allegany Reservation in middle age. He became one of the Seneca's most trusted negotiators with the Americans of the new United States. In later age, Cornplanter was granted a large plot of land in Pennsylvania, an area that was flooded following construction of the Kinzua Dam in the mid-20th century. His descendants (among them Edward Cornplanter and Jesse Cornplanter) were influential members of the Seneca Nation.
- Maxine Crouse Dowler, teacher, first Seneca member on the Board of Education of the Cattaraugus-Allegany Board of Cooperative Educational Services
- Traynor Ora Halftown (1917–2003), longtime children's TV show host at WPVI-TV in Philadelphia, known as Chief Halftown. He was also a professional bowler.
- George Heron, former Nation president, opposed construction of Kinzua Dam.
- Isaac JohnnyJohn, also known as Chief John Big Tree, model and actor
- Bemus Pierce, an early professional football player and coach
- Frank Pierce, early marathoner, first Indigenous athlete from United States to compete in the Olympics.
- Hawley Pierce, an early professional football player and coach
- Maris Bryant Pierce (1811–1874), chief, lawyer, land-rights activist
- Red Jacket (c. 1750–January 20, 1830), Chief of the Wolf Clan, a spokesperson for the Haudenosaunee, who wanted his people to keep their culture and stay out of the colonial trade markets and remain neutral and peaceful.
- Isaac Seneca, an early professional football player
- Deerfoot (c. 1828 – 18 January 1896) champion runner, Cattaraugus Reservation

== See also ==
- Seneca people
- Cattaraugus Reservation
- Seneca–Cayuga Nation
- Tonawanda Band of Seneca Indians of New York
- Seneca Nation of Indians v. Christy (1896)
