= Thomas Indian School =

- U.S. National Register of Historic Places
- U.S. Historic district
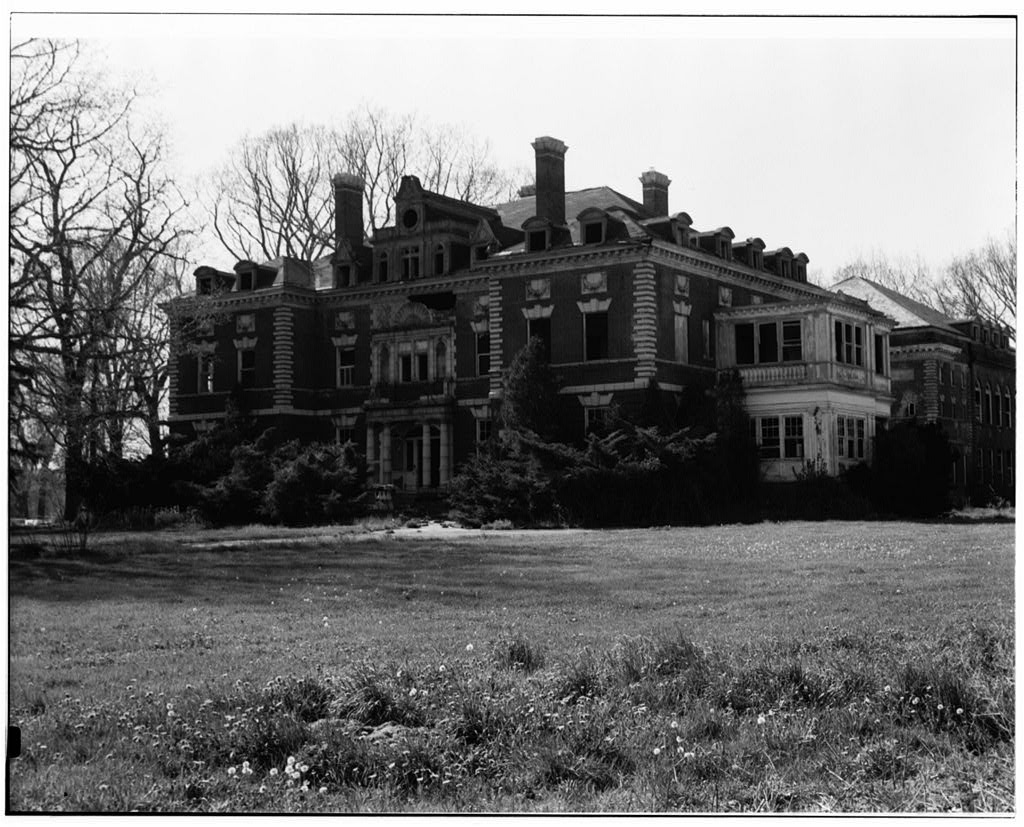
- Thomas Indian School Administration Building, 1981

- Location within New York Location within the United States
- Location: NY 438 on Cattaraugus Reservation, Irving, New York
- Coordinates: 42°32′22″N 78°59′48″W
- Built: 1900
- Architectural style: Georgian Revival
- NRHP reference No.: 73001188
- Added to NRHP: January 25, 1973

Thomas Indian School, also known as the Thomas Asylum of Orphan and Destitute Indian Children, is a historic school and national historic district located near Irving at the Cattaraugus Indian Reservation in Erie County, New York. The institution was first established in 1855 by missionaries Asher Wright and his wife Laura Wright to house the orphaned and kidnapped Seneca children of the reservation under the federal policy of forced assimilation. The complex was built in about 1900 by New York State as a self-supporting campus. Designed by the New York City firm Barney and Chapman, the campus contains the red brick Georgian Revival style main buildings and a multitude of farm and vocational buildings.

It was listed on the National Register of Historic Places in 1973.

Numerous works address the stories of former residents of Native American boarding schools in Western New York and Canada, such as Thomas Indian School, Mohawk Institute Residential School (also known as Mohawk Manual Labour School and Mush Hole Indian Residential School) in Brantford, Southern Ontario, Haudenosaunee boarding school, and the Carlisle Indian Industrial School in Carlisle, Pennsylvania; the impact of those and similar schools on their communities; and community efforts to overcome those impacts. Examples include: the film Unseen Tears: A Documentary on Boarding School Survivors, Ronald James Douglas' graduate thesis titled Documenting ethnic cleansing in North America: Creating Unseen Tears, and the Legacy of Hope Foundation's online media collection: "Where are the Children? Healing the Legacy of the Residential Schools".
