= Steamburg, New York =

Hamlet in New York, United States

Coordinates: 42°06′29″N 78°54′15″W

Steamburg is a hamlet in the Town of Coldspring in Cattaraugus County, in western New York, United States.

Steamburg, in similar fashion to a few other communities in the region, has no incorporated government and is not currently recognized by the U.S. Census Bureau, though it was recognized as the, "Village of Steamburg," in the 1880 census. Its name is noted on road signs. It is served by a phone exchange (716-354) and ZIP code (14783) in common with the Town of Coldspring and the surrounding areas.

The Erie Railroad main line ran through Steamburg and the Steamburg station was located on the south side of the tracks just east of NE May Road (formerly Depot Street).

== Background ==
The hamlet of Steamburg is marked as India Village on a Holland Land Company map dating to 1836. The hamlet's post office opened in 1861.

Steamburg serves as the western gateway to the Allegany Indian Reservation of the Seneca Nation of New York; as such, a few tax-free gasoline and cigarette shops can be found in the area. The Seneca Transit Service's bus service, founded in 2013, ends just south of Steamburg. The community is located at the eastern terminus of New York State Route 394, at I-86 exit 17. Also converging on the hamlet is New York State Reference Route 950A (West Bank Perimeter Road, a.k.a. Onoville Road), which approaches from the south, and Cattaraugus County Route 10 (Lebanon Road), which approaches from the north.

The government of the Town of Coldspring is situated in northern Steamburg, as is the Town's only formal religious institution, which until the late 2010s was a branch of the United Methodist Church. The northern part (the only part marked on road signs) is outside the reservation.

The southern part of the hamlet was developed for residential housing in the 1960s, with an acre per household, as a resettlement area to compensate some of the hundreds of Seneca displaced from their communities for construction of the Kinzua Dam and its reservoir, known as Kinzua Lake. It is located on the reservation. This is a center of the Coldspring Longhouse and has developed in a more conservative fashion since relocation in the 1960s. The tribe in the 1990s built the only medical clinic on the reservation in this community. The surrounding region also features the Highbanks Campground and the Faithkeepers School, both a short distance south of the residential areas.

Other Seneca were resettled to a new residential community, Jimerson Town, developed near Salamanca, New York. Designated as one of the two capitals of the Seneca Nation of New York, Jimson Town has been developed with more facilities, including schools, swimming pool, fire station and other amenities.

== Notable residents ==
- James Spencer Whipple, a New York.State Assemblyman and public official was born in Steamburg
