= Aboriginal title in New York =

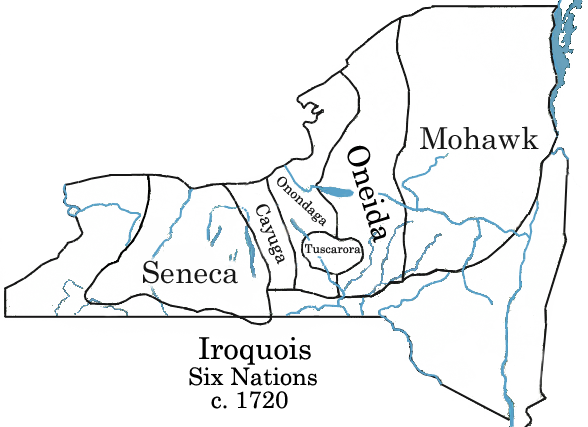
Iroquois lands circa 1720

A map showing the Phelps and Gorham Purchase, the Morris Reserve, and the Holland Purchase

Aboriginal title in New York refers to treaties, purchases, laws and litigation associated with land titles of aboriginal peoples of New York, in particular, to dispossession of those lands by actions of European Americans. The European purchase of lands from indigenous populations dates back to the legendary Dutch purchase of Manhattan in 1626, "the most famous land transaction of all." More than any other state, New York disregarded the Confederation Congress Proclamation of 1783 and the follow-on Nonintercourse Acts, purchasing the majority of the state directly from the Iroquois nations without federal involvement or ratification.

New York is the source of several landmark decisions concerning aboriginal title including Oneida I (1974), "first of the modern-day [Native American land] claim cases to be filed in federal court," and Oneida II (1985), "the first native land claim case won on the basis of the Nonintercourse Act." New York was the site of nearly all remaining Native American possessory land claims when the United States Court of Appeals for the Second Circuit held in Cayuga Nation of N.Y. v. Pataki (2005) that the equitable doctrine of laches (duty of "timeliness") bars all tribal land claims sounding in ejectment or trespass, for both tribal plaintiffs and the federal government as plaintiff-intervenor. Since the ruling, no tribal plaintiff has overcome the laches defense in a land claim in the Second Circuit.

There are currently 10 Native reservations in New York: Allegany Reservation, Cattaraugus Reservation, Oil Springs Reservation, Oneida Reservation, Onondaga Reservation, Poospatuck Reservation, St. Regis Mohawk Reservation, Shinnecock Reservation, Tonawanda Reservation, and Tuscarora Reservation.

== History ==
=== New Netherland ===
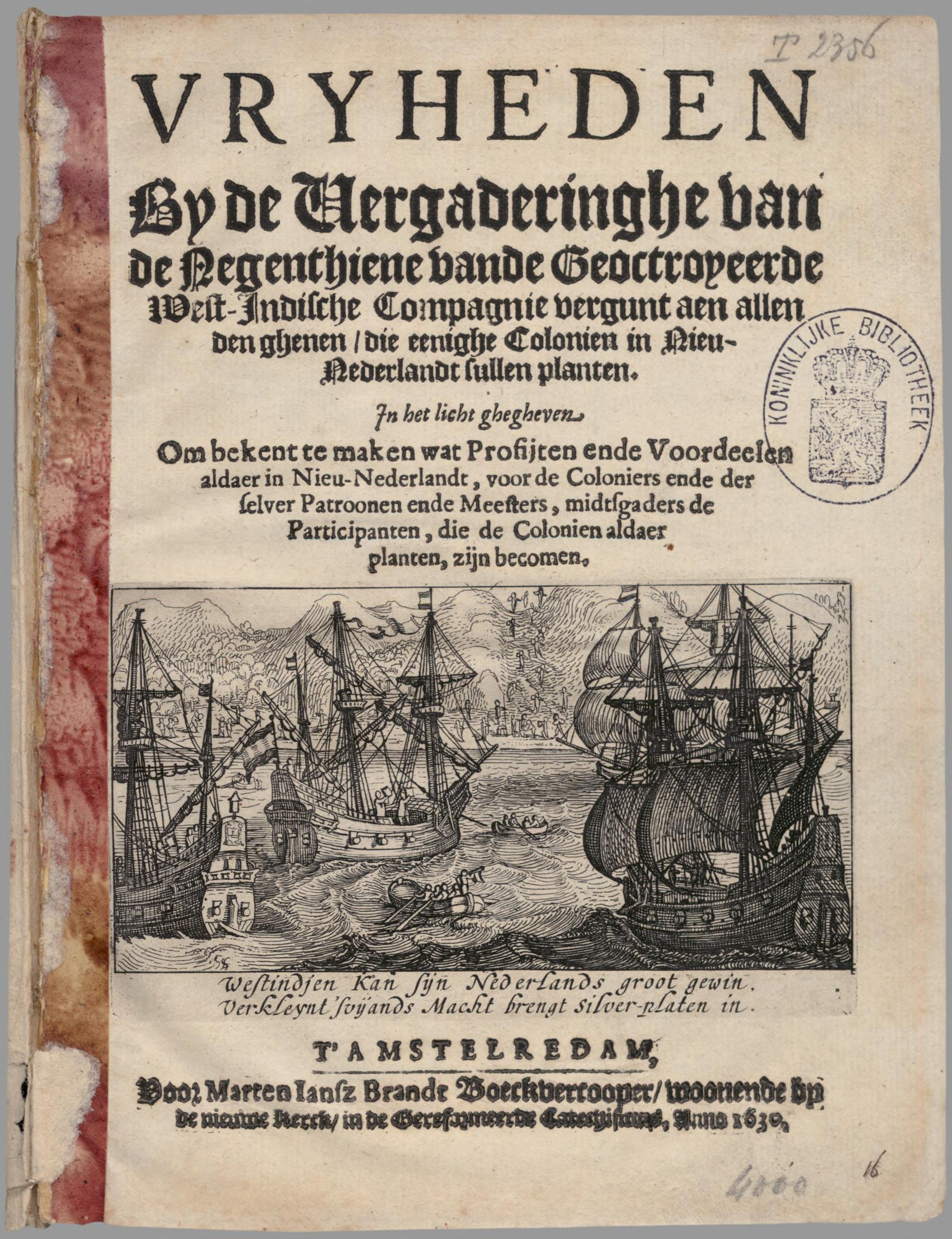
The Charter of Freedoms and Exemptions (1629) contained the first codified prohibition on private purchases of land from Natives.

The details of the early dealings with indigenous peoples by the Dutch New Netherland settlements are not known with certainty. The first recorded land transaction is for Manhattan, reported by a letter from Peter Schagen, the deputy of the Dutch West India Company, on November 5, 1626, claiming: "They have purchased the Island Manhattes from the (Natives) for the value of 60 guilders; 'tis 11,000 morgens in size." Many secondary sources simply report this value as $24; of course: United States Dollars (and the United States) did not exist in 1626; 60 guilders likely represented the estimated value of trade goods; the historical exchange rate calculation used to reach this figure is not known (if in fact it is the source of any such calculation). By comparison, the value of the goods on the ship bearing the letter back to the Netherlands was 45,000 guilders. Sixty guilders in 1626, converted and adjusted for inflation, would be $888 in 2001 U.S. dollars.

Prof. Banner, noting that the transaction was the first "purchase" of land from the indigenous population of the continent, and the fact that the natives remained in Manhattan and traded with the Dutch, argues that they would have been extremely unlikely to understand the transaction as a "sale." Other sources date the transaction to May 6, 1626. Dutch land patents traced their title to such a purchase. The colony's "New Project of Freedoms and Exemptions" (1629) prohibited private purchases of land from the indigenous population; a privilege reserved only for the Patroons of New Netherland. An amendment in 1640 gave preference "in the selections of land" to those who notified the company. The Patroons' reports to the States General refer to other land purchases in June 1634, October 25, 1634, and 1651.

=== Province of New York ===
The British concluded the Treaty of Fort Stanwix with the Iroquois in 1768, bringing the boundary line of the colony into conformity with the Royal Proclamation of 1763. The method of purchasing lands established in that treaty was codified in the 1777 Constitution of New York.

=== Articles of Confederation-era ===
During the Articles of Confederation-era, New York purchased a large amount of land from the Iroquois without complying with the requirements of the Confederation Congress Proclamation of 1783. Two-hundred years later, the Second Circuit held that the Confederation Congress had neither the intent nor the authority to restrict such purchased by states within their borders.

New York and Massachusetts had long-disputed the property and sovereign rights to modern-day western New York. They resolved their differences in 1786 with the Treaty of Hartford, granting the property rights to Massachusetts and the sovereign rights to New York. In 1788, Oliver Phelps and Nathaniel Gorham acquired the pre-emptive rights to western New York from the state of Massachusetts in what became known as the Phelps and Gorham Purchase.

=== Post-Constitution ===
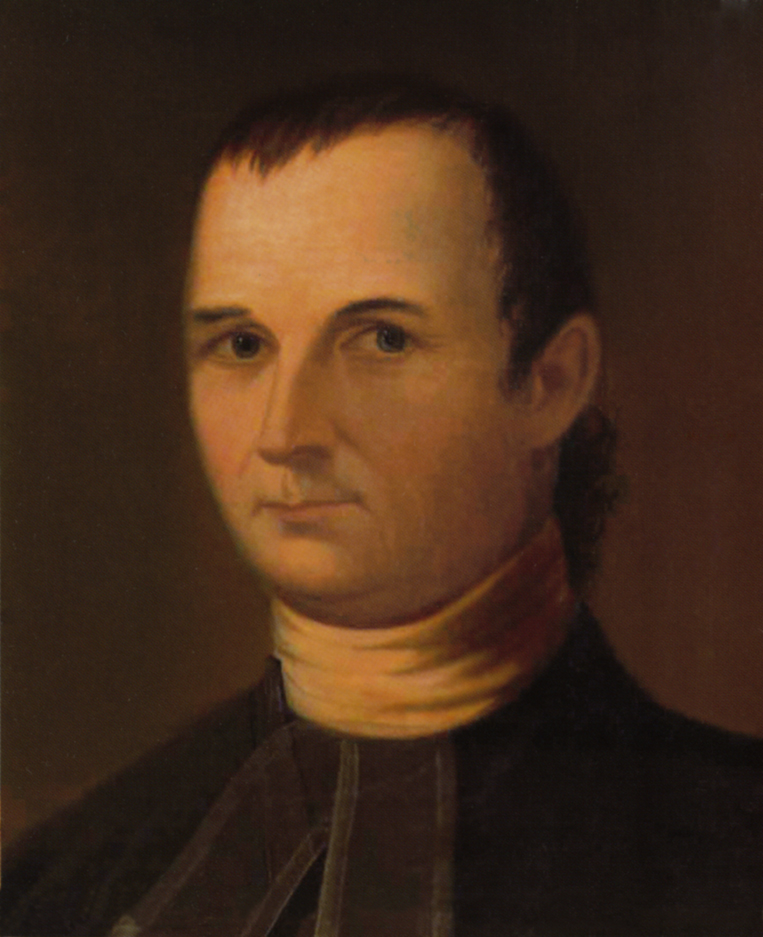
Samuel Kirkland, missionary to the Oneidas turned land speculator

President George Washington gave the following speech to the Seneca Nation of New York in 1790, after the passage of the Nonintercourse Act:

I am not uninformed that the six Nations have been led into some difficulties with respect to the sale of their lands since the peace. But I must inform you that these evils arose before the present government of the United States was established, when the separate States and individuals under their authority, undertook to treat with the (Native) tribes respecting the sale of their lands. But the case is now entirely altered. The general Government only has the power, to treat with the (Native) Nations, and any treaty formed and held without its authority will not be binding. Here then is the security for the remainder of your lands. No State nor person can purchase your lands, unless at some public treaty held under the authority of the United States. The general government will never consent to your being defrauded. But it will protect you in all your just rights.

Phelps and Gorham defaulted on their payments to Massachusetts in 1790 and the un-exercised western portion pre-emptive rights reverted to the state in 1791. Massachusetts resold the rights to Robert Morris that year. Morris retained the Morris Reserve for himself and sold the western portion of his rights to the Holland Land Company in 1792 and 1793 (the Holland Purchase).

The state of New York disregarded the requirements of the Nonintercourse Act (that a federal commissioner be present and that any sale of (Native) lands be approved by Congress) and purchased lands directly from Indians within the state until 1846.

According to Prof. Hauptman: "(Native) American, the state's first residents, ended up in a quasicolonial status, dependent on the very people—Albany policymakers—who were responsible for dispossessing them. It is little wonder that the legacy of this colonial relationship in modern times has been the Iroquois land claims movement and that the lead community pushing these claims is the Oneidas . . . ."

== Treaties ==
with the British

Treaty	Date	Treaty location	Tribe(s)	Land provisions	Notes
Treaty of Fort Stanwix	Nov. 5, 1768	Fort Stanwix	Six Nations	Line of Property established	

with the United States

Treaty	Date	Treaty location	Tribe(s)	Land provisions	Notes
Treaty of Fort Stanwix (1784)	Oct. 22, 1784	Fort Stanwix	Six Nations	Defines Western and Northern boundaries	
Treaty of Fort McIntosh	Jan. 21, 1785	Fort McIntosh (Pennsylvania)	Wyandot, Delaware, Chippewa, and Ottawa	Defines boundaries and reservations	Never enforced; superseded by treaty of Aug. 3, 1795 at Greenville
Treaty of Fort Harmar	Jan. 9, 1789	Fort Harmar (Ohio)	Six Nations	Modified treaty of Oct. 22, 1784 to protect lands south (in addition to east and north) of ceded lands	
Treaty of Canandaigua	Nov. 11, 1794	Canandaigua, New York	Six Nations	Onondaga, Oneida, and Cayuga reserves confirmed; Seneca boundaries defined	
Treaty of New York (1796)	May 31, 1796	New York City	Seven Nations of Canada	Seven Nations relinquish all claims in New York outside of two reservations	
Treaty of Albany	March 29, 1797	Albany, New York	Mohawk	Mohawks cede to New York all claims in New York	
Treaty of Big Tree	Sept. 15, 1797	Genesee, New York	Seneca	Senecas sell Morris Reserve, minus twelve reservations	
Treaty of Buffalo Creek (I)	June 30, 1802	Buffalo Creek Reservation	Seneca	Senecas cede two reservations to Holland Land Company in exchange for other lands	
Treaty of Buffalo Creek (II)	June 30, 1802	Buffalo Creek Reservation	Seneca	Senecas cede Little Beard's reservation to Phelps, Bronson, and Jones	
Treaty of Buffalo Creek (III)	Jan. 15, 1838	Buffalo Creek Reservation	"Several tribes of the New York (Natives)"	Senecas sell to Ogden and Fellows the Buffalo Creek Reservation, Cattaraugus Reserve, Allegany Reservation, and Tonawanda Reservation; Tuscaroras sell reservation to Ogden and Fellows	
Treaty of Buffalo Creek (IV)	May 20, 1842	Buffalo Creek Reservation	Seneca	Ogden and Fellows drop claim to Cattaraugus and Allegany reservations	
Treaty with the Seneca, Tonawanda Band	Nov. 5, 1857	Tonawanda Reservation	Tonawanda Band of Seneca Indians	Tonawanda Band purchase part of Tonawanda Reservation from Ogden and Fellows and surrender claim to remaining portion	

with the State of New York

Treaty	Date	Treaty location	Tribe(s)	Land provisions	Notes
	1785	Fort Herkimer	Oneida	300,000 acres (1,200 km^{2}) in Broome and Chenango counties acquired for $11,500	
	Sept. 1788	Fort Schuyler	Oneida	5,000,000 acres (20,000 km^{2}) acquired, minus reservations in Madison and Oneida counties, for $5,500 plus a $600 annuity	
	1790		Oneida	4,000 acres (16 km^{2}) in present-day Utica, New York, granted to Samuel Kirkland and his sons	
	March 1793		Onondaga	Lands around Onondaga Lake; authorized roads	
	July 27, 1795		Cayuga	All Cayuga lands except a parcel around Cayuga Lake	
	July 28, 1795		Oneida		According to Prof. Hauptman, the treaty was the "model for all Albany's efforts to dispossess the Oneidas for the next half-century."
"Salt treaty"	1795		Onondaga		
	Sept. 15, 1795		Oneida	100,000 acres (400 km^{2}) for $2,952 and $2,952 annuity	Utilized state "power of attorney" statute
	Oct. 8, 1829		Oneida	1,692 acres (6.85 km^{2}) from "First Christian Party"	

== State law ==
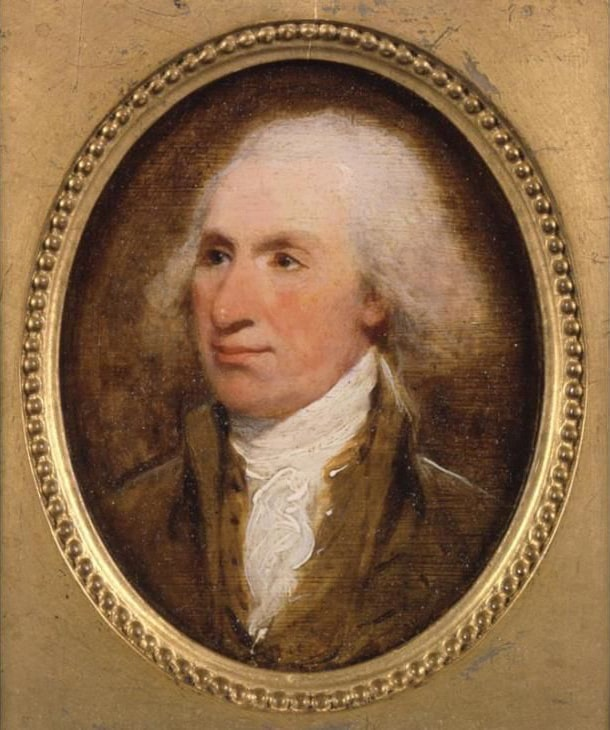
Philip Schuyler, the architect of New York's Indian policy

=== Constitution ===
N.Y. Const. of 1777 art. XXXVII provided:

And whereas it is of great importance to the safety of this State that peace and amity with the (Natives) within the same be at all times supported and maintained; and whereas the frauds too often practiced towards the said (Natives), in contracts made for their lands, have, in divers instances, been productive of dangerous discontents and animosities: Be it ordained, that no purchases or contracts for the sale of lands, made since the fourteenth day of October, in the year of our Lord one thousand seven hundred and seventy-five, or which may hereafter be made with or of the said (Natives), within the limits of this State, shall be binding on the said (Natives), or deemed valid, unless made under the authority and with the consent of the legislature of this State.

N.Y. Const. of 1821 art. VII, § 12 provided:

[(Native) lands.]—No purchase or contract for the sale of lands in this state, made since the fourteenth day of October, one thousand seven hundred and seventy-five, or which may hereafter be made, of or with the (Natives) in this state, shall be valid, unless made under the authority, and with the consent, of the legislature.

N.Y. Const. of 1846 art. I, § 16 provided:

[(Natives) lands.]—No purchase or contract for the sale of lands in this state, made since the fourteenth day of October, one thousand seven hundred and seventy-five, or which may hereafter be made, of or with the (Natives), shall be valid unless made under the authority and with the consent of the legislature.

N.Y. Const. of 1894 art. 1, § 15 and N.Y. Const. of 1938 art I. § 13 provided:

[Purchase of lands of (Natives).]—No purchase or contract for the sale of lands in this State, made since the fourteenth day of October, one thousand seven hundred and seventy-five; or which may hereafter be made, of, or with the (natives), shall be valid, unless made under the authority, and with the consent of the Legislature.

§ 13 was repealed on November 6, 1962, by popular vote.

=== Statutes ===
The New York legislature passed two laws in 1784 and 1785 for the "settlement of the waste and unappropriated lands"; the laws created methods to advertise and distribute (Native) lands to private citizens, even before the aboriginal title was extinguished.

Legislation enforcing the constitutional prohibition with sanctions was not passed until 1788.

In Feb. 1798, the legislature passed an act "Authorizing the Governor to Appoint Commissioners to treat with the Oneida (Natives) for the purchase of part of their lands."

The Act of March 31, 1821, provided:

[I]t shall be unlawful for any person or persons, other than (Natives), to settle or reside upon any lands belonging to or occupied by any nation or tribe of (Natives) within this state; and that all leases, contracts and agreements made by any (Natives), whereby any person or persons, other than (Natives), shall be permitted to reside upon such lands, shall be absolutely void; and if any person or persons shall settle or reside on any such lands, contrary to this act, it shall be the duty of any judge of any court of Common Pleas of the county within which such lands shall be situated, on complaint made to him, and on due proof of the fact of such settlement or residence, to issue his warrant, under his hand and seal, directed to the sheriff of such county, commanding him, within ten days after the receipt thereof, to remove such person or persons so settling or residing, with his, her or their families, from such lands.

=== Case law ===
- Jackson v. Wood, 7 Johns. 290 (1810) (Kent, C.J.)
- Goodell v. Jackson, 20 Johns. 693 (1823) (Kent, Ch.)

== See also ==
- Aboriginal title in the United States
- Aboriginal title in the Thirteen Colonies
- Six Nations land cessions
- Indian Removal
