= Second Treaty of Buffalo Creek =

1838 treaty between the United States and Native Americans

There are four treaties of Buffalo Creek, named for the Buffalo River in New York. The Second Treaty of Buffalo Creek, also known as the Treaty with the New York Indians, 1838, was signed on January 15, 1838 (proclaimed on April 4, 1840) between the Seneca Nation, Mohawk nation, Cayuga nation, Oneida Indian Nation, Onondaga (tribe), Tuscarora (tribe) and the United States. It covered land sales of tribal reservations under the U.S. Indian Removal program, by which they planned to move most eastern tribes to Kansas Territory west of the Mississippi River.

Treaty of Buffalo Creek-January 15, 1838-Article I-The New York Indians also agreed to "cede and relinquish to the United States all their right, title, and interest to the lands secured to them at Green Bay by the Menominee Treaty of 1831, excepting the following tract, on which a part of the New York Indians now reside." The tract was eight by twelve miles consisting of 65, 436 acres or equal to 100 acres for each of the 654 Oneida that were presently living there. This established the original boundaries of the Oneida Reservation of Wisconsin.

== History ==
In August 1826, a land company led by former Holland Land Company attorney David A. Ogden had negotiated the purchase of six of the ten reservations allocated to the Seneca tribe in the 1797 Treaty of Big Tree, all of them along the Genesee River: Canawaugus, Geneseo, Do'onondaga'a, Deyuitgaoh, Caneadea and Gardeau. To the present day, the Seneca Nation of Indians does not recognize the 1826 sale as valid, alleging the sale was made under duress and does not have to be honored because it was not accompanied by a treaty ratified by the United States government. After the sale, four reservations remained: Buffalo Creek Reservation, Tonawanda Reservation, Cattaraugus Reservation, and Allegany Reservation.

In the 1838 Treaty of Buffalo Creek, the Seneca sold the four remaining Seneca reservations, in exchange for the United States providing for the Seneca to relocate to a tract of land in present-day Kansas (then territory), west of Missouri. A section of the treaty acknowledged that the Ogden Land Company (still in operations after Ogden had died in 1829) would buy the five reservations then occupied by the Seneca Nation, after which the Ogden Land Company would sell the land to settlers for development.

The treaty was met with some controversy and resistance by Quakers residing in New York, Baltimore, and Philadelphia. These groups filed charges of fraud against the Ogden Company. Seneca young chief Maris Bryant Pierce served as a lawyer representing four of the territories. Some Seneca groups, particularly among those in the Tonawanda reservation, also claimed that most Iroquois did not support the treaty and that only a minority actually signed it. Some of these grievances helped lead to another meeting between these two parties and the creation of the further treaties.

Ultimately, the Ogden Land Company abandoned its attempts to purchase the Allegany and Cattaraugus reservations, leading to the Third Treaty of Buffalo Creek in 1842. A Tonawanda Band of Seneca was later established and reclaimed the Tonawanda Reservation in the Fourth Treaty of Buffalo Creek in 1857, declaring independence from the Seneca Nation of Indians. In 1861, the New York State Court of Appeals ruled that the Oil Springs Reservation was also Seneca territory despite not being included in any of the treaties, as Seneca witness Governor Blacksnake argued that its omission was a mistake.

== See also ==
- Treaty of Fort Stanwix (1784)
- Treaty of Canandaigua
- Treaty of Big Tree
- First Treaty of Buffalo Creek (1788)
- Third Treaty of Buffalo Creek (1842)
- Fourth Treaty of Buffalo Creek (1857)
- List of treaties
- Fellows v. Blacksmith (1857)
- New York ex rel. Cutler v. Dibble (1858)
