= Maris Bryant Pierce =

Seneca Nation chief, lawyer, teacher

- Ha-dya-no-doh
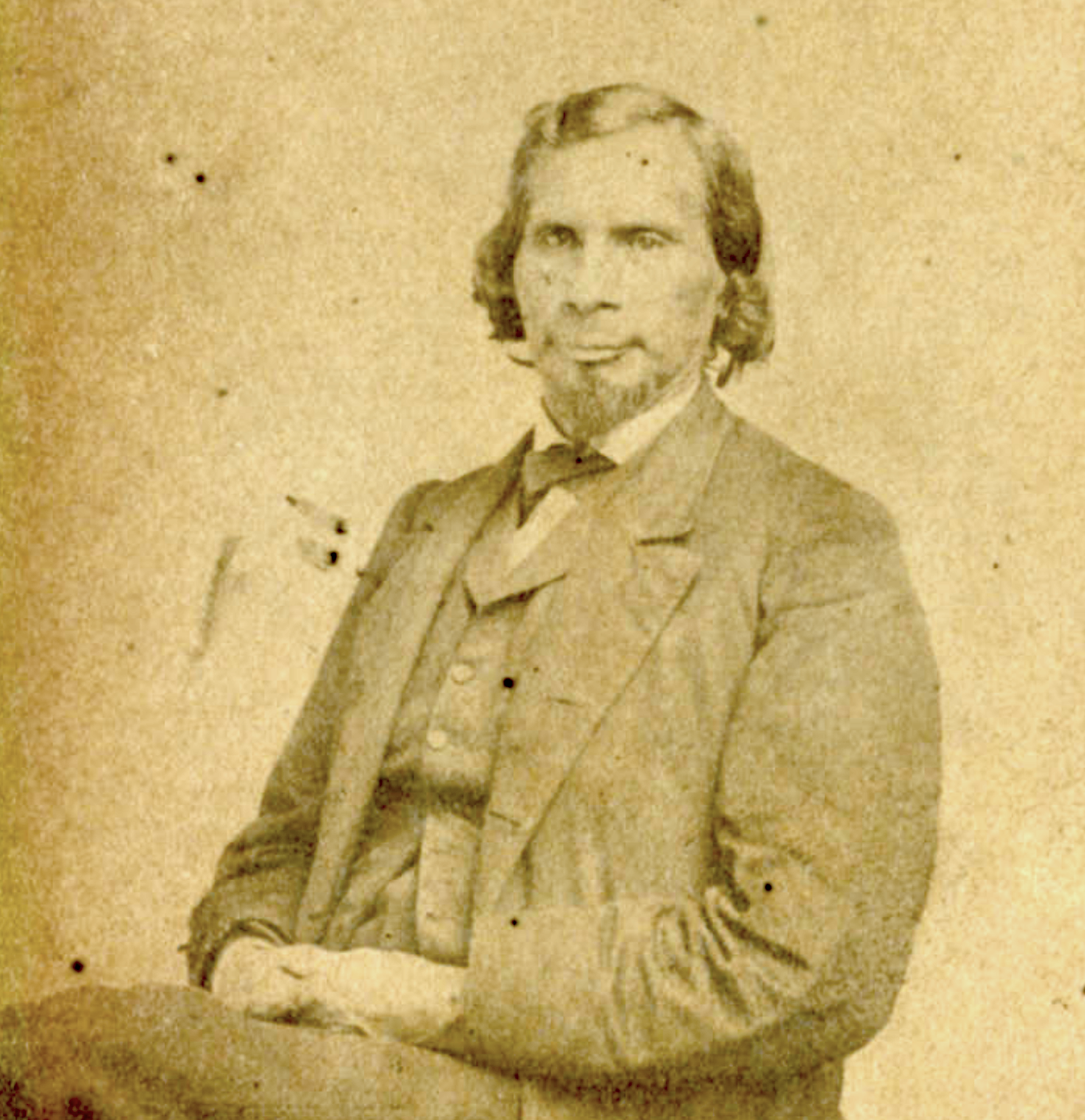
- Born: 1811; Allegany Indian Reservation
- Died: August 9, 1874 (aged 62–63); Cattaraugus Reservation
- Other names: M. B. Pierce, Swift Runner
- Citizenship: Seneca Nation, United States
- Education: Dartmouth College
- Occupations: Tribal chief, lawyer, teacher, interpreter, activist

Maris Bryant Pierce (1811–1874; also known as Ha-dya-no-doh, Swift Runner), was a Seneca Nation chief, lawyer, and teacher. He was a tribal land-rights activist, and a major influence to the Second Treaty of Buffalo Creek of 1838.

== Early life and education ==
Maris Bryant Pierce was born in 1811 on the Allegany Indian Reservation in Cattaraugus County, New York. He attended the Quaker school Fredonia Academy, and a few boarding schools in New York state, and in Thetford, Vermont. As a teenager he converted to Christianity and was a member of the Presbyterian church. After his conversion of religion, he still maintained his ancient beliefs about nature.

Pierce attended Moor's Indian Charity School (which later became Dartmouth College), from 1836 to 1840. After graduation in 1840, he settled in the Buffalo Creek Reservation.

== Career ==
While he was enrolled in college, he took on the role of "young chief". Another Seneca young chief during this time period was Nathaniel Thayer Strong (1810–1872), he served as an interpreter during the Second Treaty of Buffalo Creek and Strong supported the land removal.

The Second Treaty of Buffalo Creek of 1838 called for the sale of the Seneca land in New York state to the Ogden Land Company, and the removal of the tribe to Indian Territory in Oklahoma. Pierce was appointed as the lawyer for the Senecas located in the Tonawanda Reservation, Allegany Reservation, Cattaraugus Reservation, and Buffalo Creek Reservation. On August 28, 1838, Pierce gave the noted speech Address on the Present Condition and Prospects of Aboriginal Inhabitants of North America, with Particular Reference to the Seneca Nation, delivered in Buffalo, New York about his anti-land removal stance. Fourteen other Seneca chiefs supported Pierce in the opposition of the land removal.

After the 1840 United States Senate ratification of the Second Treaty of Buffalo Creek, Pierce continued to fight against the removal. He was an active writer for this cause. Pierce was under complex pressure as a mediator between the two cultures, and he engaged in the discussion of "European enlightenment" in order to argue against Seneca land removal. The treaty case was not resolved until 1898 (after Pierce's death), the United States government awarded a compensation of $1,998,714.46 to "the New York Indians".

Later in his career, Pierce served as a language interpreter for the Seneca Nation, and he helped the Seneca Nation adopt an elective government.

== Death and legacy ==
Pierce died on August 9, 1874, at the Cattaraugus Reservation. His work is in the archives at the Dartmouth Library and Archive, the Buffalo Historical Society (now the Buffalo History Museum), and in the Smithsonian Online Virtual Archives.

== See also ==
- Indian removal
- Treaties of Buffalo Creek
