= Canawaugus =

Seneca village

Canawaugus (/ˈkænəwɔːɡəs/, Seneca: Ganöwö:gës) was a Seneca village. In the 1790s, the village was located on the west side of the Genesee River, "about a mile above the ford", on the eastern edge of the modern Town of Caledonia. It was nearly opposite of the Avon sulphur springs.

== Name ==
Canawaugus is an anglicization of the term Ganöwö:gës, transl. 'ill smelling water'. The name (translated as "Cattaraugus" in other Iroquoian languages) means "stinking waters" because of the sulphur. It has also been spelled as Conawagus, Ca-noh-wa-gas, or Conewaugus)

== Population ==
Canawaugus was one of the most populous of the Seneca villages, with a population approaching 1,000 people.

== History ==
=== 18th century ===
The Seneca religious leader Handsome Lake was born here about 1735. Governor Blacksnake moved here shortly after his birth. Cornplanter was born here around 1750.

Although some early sources assume the village was destroyed in the Sullivan Expedition of 1779, the officers' journals do not describe the army reaching farther north than Cuylerville.

Canawaugus was one of the 11 reservations retained by the Seneca Nation in the Treaty of Big Tree in 1797, and the parcel encompassed the existing village on the west side of the Genesee River.

=== 19th century ===
The reservation land was sold to the Ogden Land Company in 1826. The Seneca Nation of Indians claims that the 1826 sale was never legal because it would have required a treaty be ratified by the United States Senate, and that the Canawaugus reservation was never disestablished. The Ogden Land Company would later purchase the Senecas' remaining lands in the Second Treaty of Buffalo Creek in 1838, before returning the Allegany, Cattaraugus and Oil Spring reservations in the Third Treaty of Buffalo Creek in 1842.

=== Restoration to the Seneca ===
In December 2022, the Seneca Nation of Indians purchased a 1.8-acre (0.73 ha) plot that had been on the Canawaugus reservation and claimed sovereignty over it as a continuation of the original Canawaugus reservation.
