= Tonawanda Seneca Nation =

Federally-recognized Native American tribe

Ta:nöwödeʼ Onödowáʼga:ʼ Yoindzadeʼ

Total population
- Enrolled members

Regions with significant populations
- New York
- About 700

Languages
- English, Seneca

Religion
- Longhouse religion, Christianity

Related ethnic groups
- Seneca Nation, Seneca-Cayuga Nation, Konadaha Seneca First Nation, Niharondasa Seneca First Nation, other Haudenosaunee people

The Tonawanda Seneca Nation (Seneca: Ta:nöwödeʼ Onödowáʼga꞉ʼ Yoindzadeʼ, previously known as the Tonawanda Band of Seneca Indians) is a federally recognized tribe of Seneca people in the State of New York. They maintain the traditional form of government led by hoyaneh (hereditary Seneca chiefs) selected by clan mothers. The Nation governs the 7,500-acre Tonawanda Reservation near Akron, New York..

The Seneca are one of the original Five Nations (later six) of the Haudenosaunee Confederacy. Their people speak the Seneca language, an Iroquoian language. The Tonawanda Seneca Nation is one of two federally recognized Seneca tribes in Western New York; the other is the Seneca Nation of Indians. The latter approved a republican constitution in 1848, electing an American-style legislature and executive to govern their lands of the Allegany, Cattaraugus, and Oil Springs reservations.

The Tonawanda Band opted out of participating in the republic (in part due to hostilities stemming from the Buffalo Creek sale), leading to the band's formation nine years later. In 1857, the Tonawanda Band signed a treaty with the United States and was recognized as a tribe independent of the Seneca Nation of Indians. The new treaty with the US allowed the Tonawanda Band to buy back lands from the Ogden Land Company, which had been sold out without their permission in the Treaties of Buffalo Creek. The Tonawanda retrieved the horns of authority and other artifacts from the other Seneca tribes and continued the traditional Seneca government that existed before 1848. They have a matrilineal kinship system; hereditary chiefs are selected through the maternal line by clan mothers.

== History ==
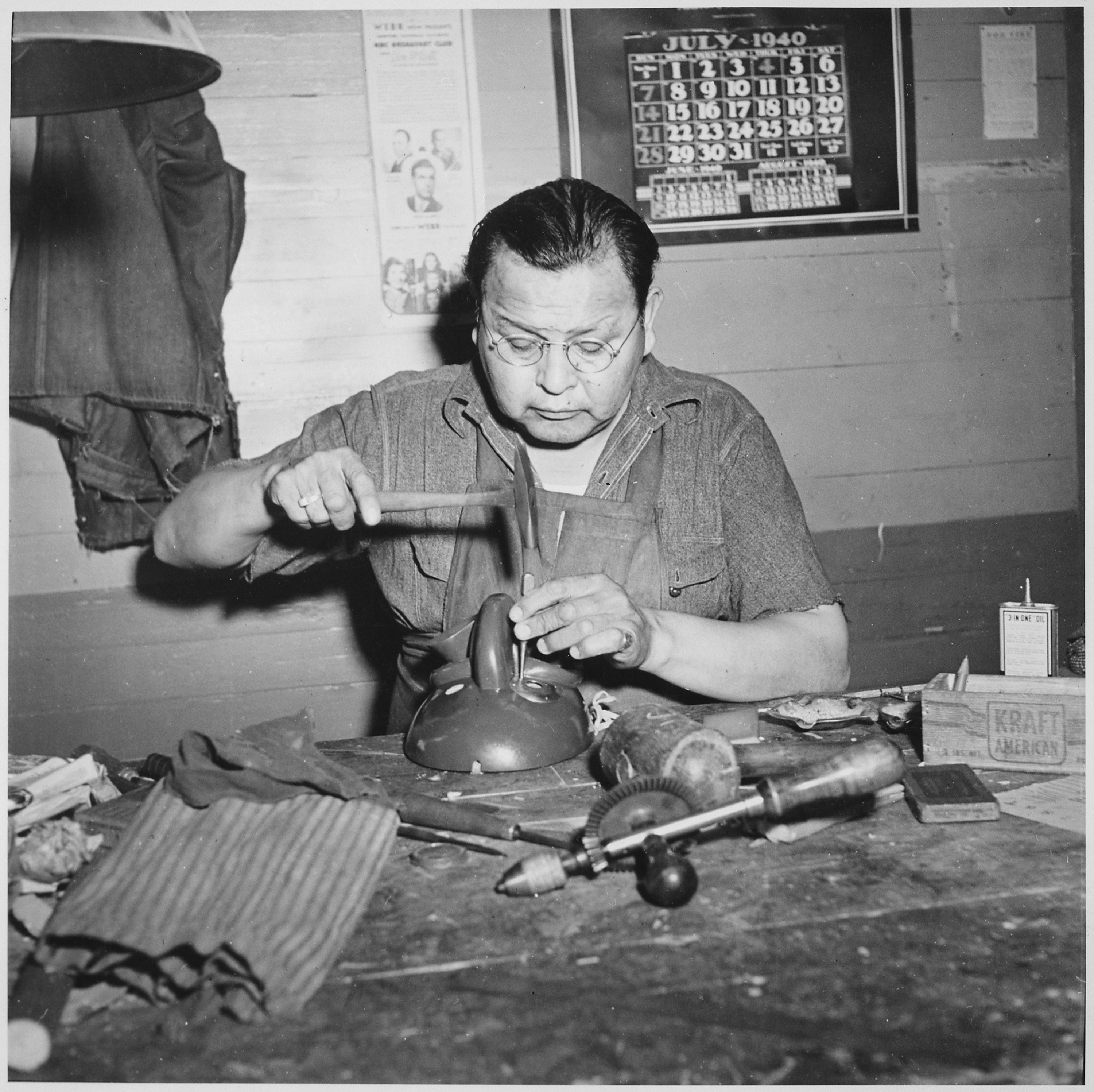
Jesse Cornplanter, the last descendant of Cornplanter with the Cornplanter name, making a ceremonial mask, Tonawanda Community House, 1940

On 15 January 1838, the United States government entered into the Treaty of Buffalo Creek, with nine Indian nations of New York, including the Seneca. The treaty was part of the United States Indian Removal program, by which they forced Native American peoples from eastern states to move west of the Mississippi River to reservation lands in the less-desired and therefore less-settled Kansas Territory (now the state of Kansas and parts of Colorado). This government removal also displaced the Indigenous peoples of those areas. The US wanted the Seneca and other New York tribes to move there to free up desirable lands for the European-American colonists to take over and settle. Under the treaty, the US acknowledged that the Ogden Land Company was going to buy the four remaining Seneca reservations in New York, the proceeds funding the nation's removal to Kansas Territory.

The US modified the 1838 treaty with the Treaty with the Seneca of 1842. The new treaty reflected that the Ogden Land Company had purchased only two reservations, including the Tonawanda Reservation. The Seneca retained the Cattaraugus and Allegany reservations. At this time, the Seneca of the Tonawanda Reservation protested they had not been consulted on either treaty, nor had their chiefs signed either treaty. They refused to leave their reservation.

In 1848, the Seneca Indians of the Cattaraugus and Allegany reservations held a constitutional convention. They adopted a new form of constitution and government, including the election of chiefs by popular vote. Traditionally, hereditary chiefs are selected by clan mothers and hold their office for life (unless their clan and its clan mother depose them.)

The Tonawanda Band did not want to make such changes. They continued their traditional government with a council of chiefs representing each of their eight clans. In 1857, under the "Treaty with the Seneca, Tonawanda Band", the Tonawanda Band of Seneca Indians secured federal recognition as an independent Indian nation. With their share of proceeds from the earlier land sale, they bought back most of the Tonawanda Reservation.

Under their traditional government, hereditary chiefs typically serve for life. They govern by a consensus of the clans. The Seneca and all the Haudenosaunee peoples have a matrilineal kinship system, in which descent and property are passed through the maternal line. Children are considered born into the mother's clan and take their status from her people.

"The Tonawanda Band consists of eight 'clans': the Snipe, the Heron, the Hawk, the Deer, the Wolf, the Beaver, the Bear, and the Turtle. Each clan appoints a clan mother, who in turn appoints an individual to serve as Chief [from hereditary maternal lines]. The clan mother retains the power to remove a Chief and, in consultation with members of the clan, provides recommendations to the Chief on matters of tribal government. The clan mothers cannot disregard the views of the clan, nor can the Chiefs disregard the recommendations of the clan mothers."

== See also ==
- Haudenosaunee
- Seneca people
- Seneca Nation of Indians
