= Fourth Treaty of Buffalo Creek =

1857 treaty between the United States and Native Americans

The Fourth Treaty of Buffalo Creek or Treaty with the Seneca, Tonawanda Band is a modification of the Second Treaty of Buffalo Creek and Third Treaty of Buffalo Creek.

The Tonawanda Band of Seneca Indians objected to their inclusion in the treaties, claiming that their chiefs were not included in negotiations and that the Seneca chiefs that were present did not represent them. When agents of the land companies came to claim the Tonawanda reservation land, the Tonawanda refused to leave. (On a related note, in 1848, the other Seneca tribes approved the establishment of an American-style republican government, which the Tonawanda also rejected; the Tonawanda opted to continue with the traditional Seneca model, thus formally codifying the split between the two Seneca tribes.)

To settle the issue with the Tonawanda sale, the U.S. signed a treaty with the Tonawanda Band in 1857 that was known as the Treaty with the Seneca, Tonawanda Band. The Seneca bought back most of their reservation with the money set aside for their removal to Kansas. At the same time, they seceded from the main Seneca nation and restored their traditional government of a Council of Chiefs, based on consensus.

== See also ==
- Treaty of Fort Stanwix (1784)
- Treaty of Canandaigua
- Treaty of Big Tree
- First Treaty of Buffalo Creek (1788)
- Second Treaty of Buffalo Creek (1838)
- Third Treaty of Buffalo Creek (1842)
- List of treaties
- Fellows v. Blacksmith (1857)
- New York ex rel. Cutler v. Dibble (1858)
