= First Treaty of Buffalo Creek =

1788 treaty

The First Treaty of Buffalo Creek signed on July 8, 1788 Phelps and Gorham purchased title to lands east from the Genesee River in New York to the Preemption Line.

== See also ==
- Treaty of Canandaigua
- Treaty of Big Tree
- Second Treaty of Buffalo Creek (1838)
- Third Treaty of Buffalo Creek (1842)
- Fourth Treaty of Buffalo Creek (1857)
