= Phyllis Bardeau =

Native American writer (1934–2023)

Phyllis Eileen Williams Bardeau (Seneca: Gayanögwad, April 2, 1934 – September 1, 2023) was a Seneca (Onödowaʼga꞉ʼ) author, and educator, and lexicographer. She was best known for her work on the Seneca language, including Seneca language dictionaries.

== Biography ==
Bardeau was born on April 2, 1934 on the Allegany Indian Reservation (Ohi:yo’) in Cattaraugus County, New York. She grew up speaking Seneca with her grandmother on a farm in Coldspring, New York. Following her marriage she moved to the Cattaraugus Reservation (Ga’dä:gë́́sgë:ö’)

In 1951, Bardeau began to teach the Seneca language, first to a class of adults, then at the high school in Gowanda, New York. She then attended the State University of New York at Buffalo, earning a masters' degree in American Studies in 1994. She served as an instructor there, and developed a syllabus for courses in the Seneca Language, which were offered beginning in 2019.

She worked on standardizing the Seneca syllabary. She also collaborated with Wallace Chafe on his English–Seneca Dictionary.

In 1990 she returned to the Allegany Reservation, where she worked on writing, research and documentation of the Seneca Language, and provided support for Seneca Language programs there.

Bardeau died on September 1, 2023, at the age of 89.

== Publications ==
Bardeau was the author of several books on Seneca Language and culture.

- Bardeau, Phyllis E. Wms. (2002). onöndowa'ga:' gawë:nö' (PDF). Cattaraugus Territory: Seneca Nation Education Department. ISBN 0-9743377-0-6.
- Bardeau, Phyllis E. Wms. (2003). Iroquois Woodland Favorites. Seneca Nation Education Department.
- Bardeau, Phyllis E. Wms. (2007). The Seneca Verb Labeling the Ancient Voice (PDF). Seneca Nation Education Department.
- Bardeau, Phyllis E. Wms. (2008). Fundamentals of Seneca (PDF) (revised ed.). Seneca Nation.
- Bardeau, Phyllis E. Wms. (2010). Definitive Seneca It's in the Word. Salamanca, NY: RAJ Publications. ISBN 978-0-359-81740-5.
- Bardeau, Phyllis. "Seneca Language Teacher's Dictionary" (PDF). senecalanguage.com. Seneca Nation Education Department.
- Bardeau, Phyllis Eileen Wms. The Standing Pot. ISBN 9781716867590.
- Bardeau, Phyllis E. Wms. (2017). A Woodland Creation Story (PDF). The Seneca Allegany Language Department.
