= Oil Springs Reservation =

Oil Springs Reservation Tga:no’s (Seneca)
- Indian Reservation
- Location of Oil Springs Reservation in New York
- Coordinates: 42°13′56″N 78°18′20″W

Area
  - Total: 0.96 sq mi (2.5 km^{2})
  - Land: 0.95 sq mi (2.5 km^{2})
  - Water: 0 sq mi (0.00 km^{2})

Population (2010)
  - Total: 1
  - Estimate (2016): 1
  - Density: 1.1/sq mi (0.41/km^{2})
- Website: http://www.sni.org/oilsprings.html

Oil Springs Reservation or Oil Spring Reservation (Seneca: Tga:no’s) is an Indian reservation of the federally recognized Seneca Nation that is located in southwestern New York, United States. As of the 2010 census, the Indian reservation had one resident; in 2005 no tribal members had lived on the property. The reservation covers about one square mile (2.6 km^{2}), divided between the present-day counties of Allegany and Cattaraugus. The reservation is northwest of the village of Cuba. It is bordered by the Town of Cuba and the Town of Ischua.

The Seneca and earlier indigenous peoples had learned to use the petroleum-tainted water of the spring at this site for medicinal purposes. French Jesuit missionaries learned about its properties from the Seneca and recorded the spring as early as the 17th century. Today the Seneca operate two tax-free gas stations on this reservation to generate revenue for their people's welfare.

== History ==
When the French Jesuit missionary Joseph de La Roche Daillon reached this area in 1627, the Oil Springs were held by the now defunct Wenro, an Iroquoian-speaking tribe. The Wenro abandoned the area in 1639, hoping to retrench with their allies the Huron further northwest, as their eastern neighbors, the Seneca of the Haudenosaunee Confederacy, were attacking these tribes and rapidly conquering territory in order to expand their hunting grounds for the fur trade. The Seneca, Mohawk, and other three nations of the Haudenosaunee Confederacy were trying to dominate the lucrative fur trade with the French in this area.

The Seneca sided with the English in the American Revolution and after their defeat, Britain ceded control of its territory in the lower colonies to the new United States, including the lands controlled by the Haudenosaunee nations. In addition, due to the ferocity of the war in New York, most residents wanted the Indians expelled even though two nations had supported the rebels. The Seneca and other Haudenosaunee nations were forced to cede most of their lands to the US. In the Treaty of Canandaigua, the Seneca negotiated the right to keep five plots: the territory around Oil Springs and the Allegheny River, the land surrounding Cattaraugus Creek, the former Neutral lands around Buffalo Creek, and their primary site of what is now known as the Tonawanda Reservation.

Seneca diplomat Cornplanter, who had aided in negotiations with the United States representatives, was later granted an additional 1500-acre plot in Pennsylvania by that state legislature as personal property for him and his descendants. Mary Jemison, a European-American woman who had been taken captive and assimilated into the Seneca tribe, was also granted land but sold her plot a few years later and established Jemison Town on the Allegany Reservation. Many Seneca moved to Canada, settling with other Haudenosaunee at the Six Nations Grand River Reserve in what is now Ontario.

During the federal Indian Removal period of the 1830s, the Ogden Land Company conspired to buy all of the remaining Seneca lands in New York. They bribed, intimidated, and deceived a number of the Seneca chiefs to sign the Treaty of Buffalo Creek to that effect. In the end, Ogden purchased only the Buffalo Creek Reservation and left intact Oil Springs (along with the Allegany and Cattaraugus reservations).

In 1848 the Seneca Nation of Indians formed as a federally recognized tribe, counting the Oil Springs Reservation as one of its three territories (along with the Allegany and Cattaraugus reservations). Oil Springs is the only one of the three Seneca territories without a recognized capital or any jurisdictional representation in Seneca government.

In the 1850s, the Seneca began a case to evict squatters (including Stanley Clark, Philonus Pattison, Benjamin Chamberlain, William Gallagher, and future New York governor Horatio Seymour) from the Oil Springs Reservation, in order to restore control and use to the tribe. Clark and others had surveyed the land and allotted portions to influential men, including Seymour.

Thanks to the efforts of influential Seneca leader Governor Blacksnake, the state appeals court ruled in the tribe's favor. The reservation was returned to the Seneca in 1861, two years after Blacksnake died. Blacksnake, who had attended the negotiations of the Treaty of Big Tree, testified in court that he and Joseph Ellicott had surveyed the Oil Spring lands and that omission of the lands from the treaty was a mistake. He had a map copied by the Holland Land Company in which the Oil Spring reservation was marked similarly to the other lands of the Seneca.

The U.S. Census of 1890 lists the name of the reservation as Oil Spring Reservation. It is unclear when the reservation's name was changed to Oil Springs; the change may have happened because people used a term that flowed more easily as language. A change shortly after the 1890 census would be consistent with the establishment of the United States Board on Geographic Names that same year, which altered and standardized several place names.

The Seneca have operated a bingo and gaming hall at Oil Springs since 2014.

== Geography ==
According to the United States Census Bureau, the Allegany County portion of the Indian reservation has a total area of 0.59 square miles (1.5 km^{2}). Most of it is land while 1.64% is water, most of which is a portion of Cuba Lake.

The Cattaraugus County portion of the Indian reservation, in the Town of Ischua, has a total area of 0.37 square miles (0.96 km^{2}), all land.

== Demographics ==
Historical population
Census	Pop.	Note	%±
1970	5		—
1980	6		20.0%
1990	5		−16.7%
2000	11		120.0%
2010	1		−90.9%
2020	20		1,900.0%
U.S. Decennial Census

As of the census of 2010, there are no residents in the Town of Ischua area of the reservation. The single resident on the reservation is Native American and lives in the Allegany County portion of the property.
