= Handsome Lake =

Haudenosaunee Seneca religious leader

- Sganyodaiyoʼ
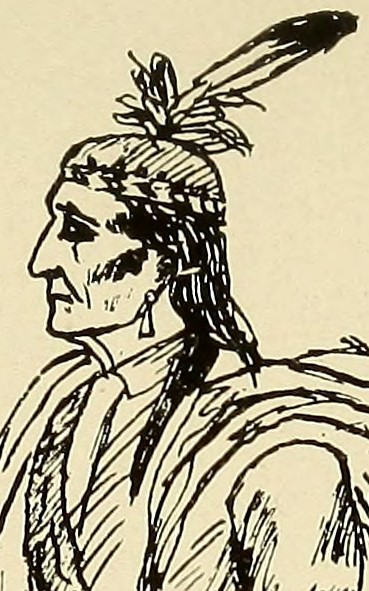
- Drawing by Jesse Cornplanter
- Born: Hadawaʼko; 1735; Canawaugus
- Died: August 10, 1815 (aged 79–80)
- Other names: Sganyadái꞉yo; Sganyodaiyo; Ganio'dai'io’; Ganiodaʼyo; Ganiodaio; Conudiu; Conudia; Ga-Nyah-Di-Yoh; Kaniatario
- Occupations: Hoyaneh, prophet
- Known for: The Code of Handsome Lake (Kaliwihyo/Gaihwi꞉io)
- Office: Hoyaneh (Sganyodaiyoʼ)

Handsome Lake (Seneca: Sganyodaiyoʼ, 1735 – 10 August 1815) was a Seneca religious leader and Hoyaneh of the Haudenosaunee (Iroquois or Six Nations). He was a half-brother to Cornplanter (Gayë́twageh), a Seneca war chief.

A leader and prophet, Handsome Lake played a major role in reviving traditional religion among the Haudenosaunee. He preached a message that combined traditional Haudenosaunee religious beliefs with a revised code meant to revive traditional consciousness to the Haudenosaunee after a long period of cultural disintegration following colonization. This message was eventually published as the "Code of Handsome Lake" and is still practiced today.

== Name ==
Handsome Lake is a traditional Hoyaneh name among the Seneca. The name is condoled by clan mothers in quasi-hereditary succession when the prior holder dies or is removed from office. Prior to his condolence, he was known as Hadawaʼko ("Shaking Snow").

Handsome Lake's name is transcribed differently in the languages of the Six Nations:

- Seneca: Ganyodaiyoʼ or Sganyodaiyoʼ
- Cayuga: Sganyadáiyoˀ
- Onondaga: Sganya·dái·yoʼ
- Oneida: Skanatalihyo
- Mohawk: Skaniatario
- Tuscarora: Θkanyatararí·yau·

The name was historically recorded also as Ganioda'yo, Ganiodaio, Conudiu, Conudiu, Ga-Nyah-Di-Yoh, and Kaniatario.

== Early life ==
Handsome Lake was born as Hadawaʼko ("Shaking Snow") around 1735 in the Seneca village of Canawaugus, on the Genesee River near present-day Avon, New York. He was born into the Wolf clan of his mother, in keeping with the matrilineal kinship system of the Haudenosaunee. At their peak in the early 18th century, the Haudenosaunee controlled much of what is now the midwestern United States, which they had conquered through decades of warring against the tribes native to those areas in the Beaver Wars.

Very little is known of Handsome Lake's parents; his mother, Gahonnoneh (Seneca: Deyagoʼka:heh), later had an affair with a Dutch fur trader and gunsmith, resulting in the birth of Handsome Lake's half-brother, Cornplanter. Other well-known relatives in Handsome Lake's family included Chainbreaker or Governor Blacksnake (Të́꞉wö꞉nyaʼs), Red Jacket (Shagoyá꞉wa꞉taʼ), and Half-Town.

== Fracturing of Haudenosaunee society ==
Handsome Lake is visited by the spirit of corn, by Jesse Cornplanter

Born during a time when the Seneca nation was at its peak of prosperity through fur trading, Handsome Lake witnessed the gradual deterioration of his society.

Several factors contributed to the erosion of morale and spiritual welfare of the Haudenosaunee.

In 1779, Handsome Lake wanted to die after the Continental Army attacked the Haudenosaunee villages through the Sullivan-Clinton Campaign, burning whole communities and killing many. In his despair, Handsome Lake was said to have envisioned a visit by the Three Sisters--the spirits of the corn, beans, and squash. The Three Sisters' visit prompted Handsome Lake to return to and re-teach his community its traditional agricultural practices.

Defeated by the Patriots in the American Revolution, he and other Haudenosaunee leaders signed the U.S. treaty with the Six Nations (known as the Pickering Treaty or Treaty of Canandaigua) in 1794. The Haudenosaunee lost most of their land in New York and Pennsylvania and were forced to live on reservations. Although these reservations contained several of the prominent creek and river valleys in Western New York, the small and fragmented native territories were separated by wide swaths of land that was eventually earmarked for American settlement in the Holland Purchase. Faced with the prospect of American settlement, many Haudenosaunee moved to the Haldimand Tract in Upper Canada, a tract measured as six miles on either side of the Ontario which was given by the British to the Haudenosaunee as compensation for their support during the war. This dislocation followed years of social disruption due to epidemics of infectious disease and major wars.

Alcohol was introduced to the Six Nations in this time frame, a substance which many Haudenosaunee (including Handsome Lake himself) began consuming in excess, exacerbating the erosion of the traditional family unit. This situation was a result of the cultural clash between the fledgling United States and the weakened Six Nations. The traditional religious rituals were no longer applicable to the environment in which the Haudenosaunee people found themselves.

== Prophet of Gaihwi꞉io ==
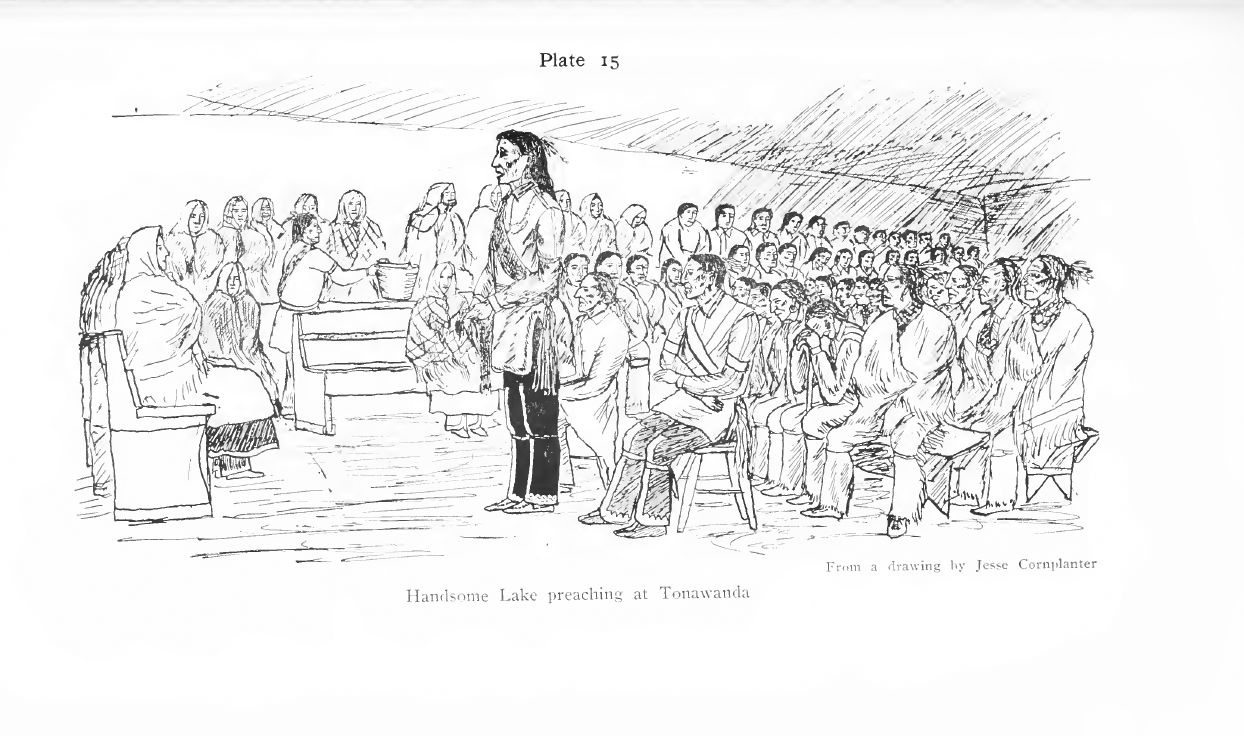
Handsome Lake Preaching at Tonawanda by Jesse Cornplanter

In 1799, after a period of illness due to many years of excessive alcoholism, Handsome Lake had the visions that led to his conversion into a prophet. In his vision, he was warned by four spiritual messengers (Ge:i Niënödi:h) who presented him with ideals that he must enforce among his people. They told him of concerns he must enforce, like learning the English language and preservation of their land. Shortly after Handsome Lake's first vision, he ceased drinking alcohol. When he regained his health, he began bringing a message of Gaihwi꞉io (or Kaliwihyo) (the "Good Word") to his people. He preached against drunkenness and other evil practices. His message outlined a moral code that was eventually referred to as the Code of Handsome Lake. Today it is called the Longhouse Religion.

Handsome Lake abolished societal sins, attempting to cleanse the tribes of all immoral actions. He threatened his people in order to show them the error of their ways. He insisted that Haudenosaunee must refrain from drinking, marital abuse, abortion, spouse and child abandonment, selling of land, overconsumption, intensive animal farming, and witchcraft (gaháih).

The rise of Handsome Lake's Way of Life was more successful than most religions during that time because his code combined traditional Haudenosaunee way of life with Quaker values. Despite the clear presence of Christian values in his teachings, it is unclear how much contact with Christianity Handsome Lake had previous to his visions. His way of life stressed survival without the sacrifice of the Haudenosaunee identity, and recognized the need to make adjustments in order to survive in their changing world. Handsome Lake's ideals were eye opening and majority of people agreed with him. Those who opposed the code had reasons to believe that Handsome Lake was giving up on their old ways by altering the character of their way of life. They saw Handsome Lake's new ideals as abandoning their history and forfeiting to Quaker ideals because Handsome Lake did not believe that they could survive with the world evolving around them.

Handsome Lake visited Washington, D.C., with Cornplanter in 1802. Then-President Thomas Jefferson gave his endorsement to Handsome Lake's code. With the help of Handsome Lake’s relatives, his visions were written down and published in 1850. The Code of Handsome Lake remains practiced among the Seneca and is considered to be a traditional Indian way of life. Beginning in the 1820s, it became traditional for the Code to be recited every September at Tonawanda in the Seneca Nation.

== A Tale Of How America Was Discovered ==
How America Was Discovered is a story told by Handsome Lake, and documented by Arthur C. Parker, about a young minister who meets the one he perceives to be the Lord, who then asks him to go to a new land and bring with him cards, money, a fiddle, whiskey, and blood corruption. In return the young minister will become rich. The young minister sought out Christopher Columbus, and with the help of his crew, traveled to the Americas. They turned back to report what they had seen, which caused an immigration of people from Europe to the Americas. Along with the people came the five things that aided in destroying the natives. The end reveals that the "Lord" in the gold castle was actually the devil, and that even he knew what he had caused was wrong.

== See also ==
- Tenskwatawa, Shawnee Prophet
- Wovoka, founder of the Ghost Dance movement
- Smohalla, dreamer-prophet associated with the Dreamers movement in the Pacific Northwest
- Native American temperance activists
