= Seneca Buffalo Creek Casino =

Casino in Buffalo, New York

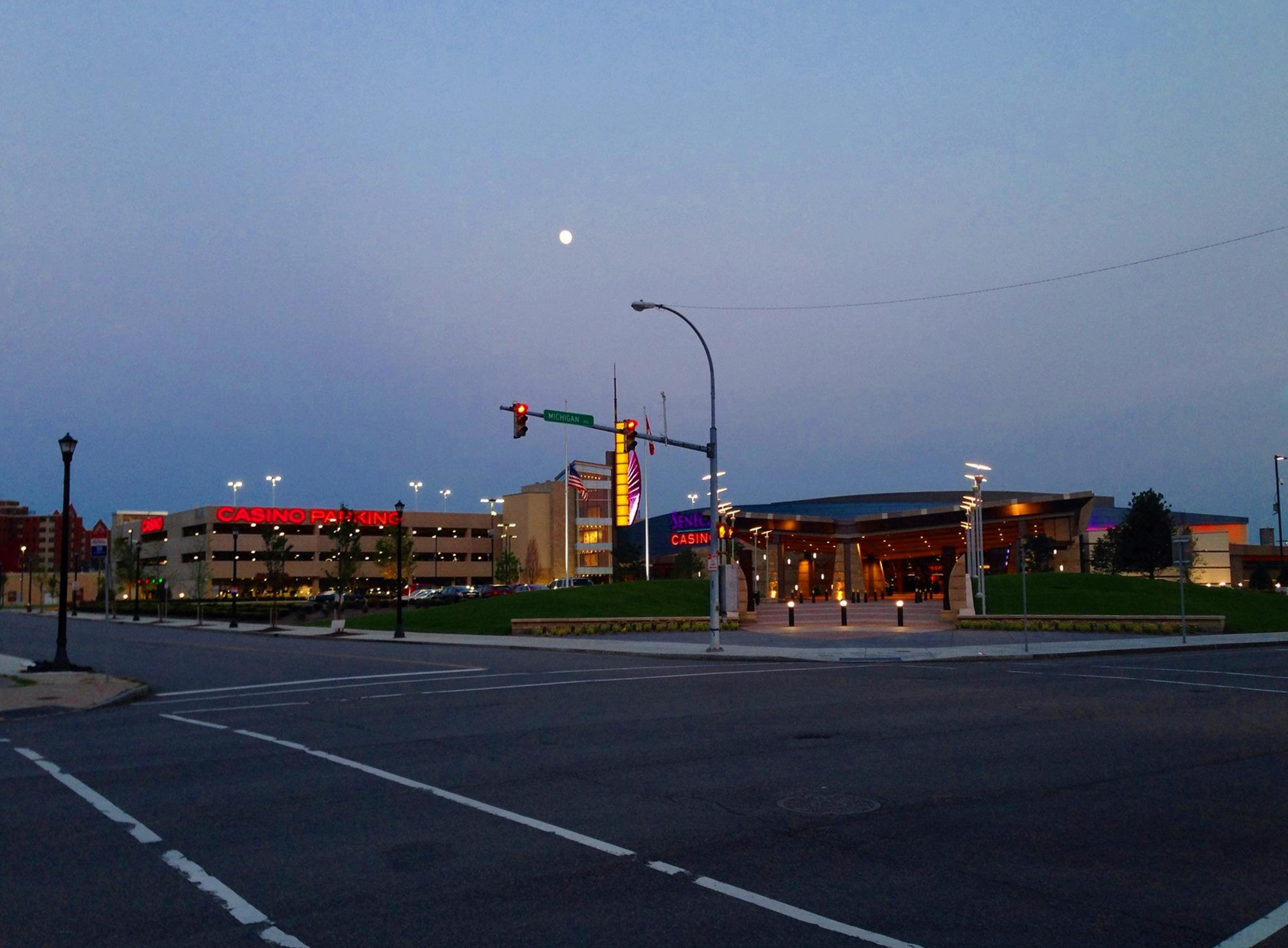
- Location: 1 Fulton Street Buffalo, New York 14204
- Opened: July 3, 2007
- Gaming space: 67,000 sq ft (6,200 m^{2})
- Casino type: Land-based
- Owner: Seneca Nation of Indians
- Architect: Hnedak Bobo Group (HBG)
- Renovated in: March 2012 - August 27, 2013
- Website: Seneca Buffalo Creek

Seneca Buffalo Creek Casino is a casino in Buffalo, New York, United States. It is owned by the Seneca Nation of New York, through the Seneca Gaming Corporation. The complex consists of 67,000 sq ft (6,200 m^{2}) of gaming space. It opened as a temporary structure on July 3, 2007, and a permanent casino building opened on August 27, 2013. A much larger and more expensive investment had previously been planned, prior to the Great Recession. The casino attracts about 3 million visitors annually.

== See also ==
- Buffalo Creek Reservation
