= Governor Blacksnake =

Seneca nation War Chief

Chainbreaker
- Të꞉wö꞉nyaʼs
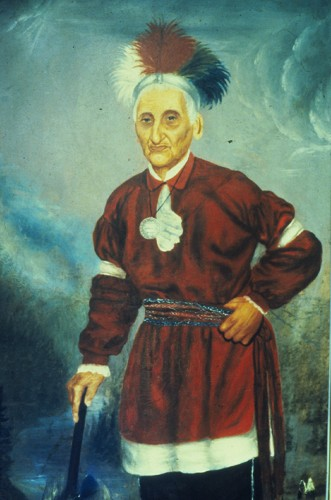
- Chainbreaker, painted by John Phillips, 1845

Seneca leader

Personal details
- Born: Between 1737 and 1760
- Died: December 26, 1859 Allegany Reservation, New York.
- Resting place: Hillside Haven Cemetery, Cattaraugus County, New York
- Relations: Uncles, Cornplanter and Handsome Lake
- Known for: Fought with the British at Battle of Oriskany, during the American Revolutionary War; fought with the Americans in the War of 1812
- Nickname(s): Blacksnake, Governor Blacksnake

Të꞉wö꞉nyaʼs (Note: lit. 'he breaks wire', also spelled "Tah-won-ne-ahs" or "Thaonawyuthe") (born before 1760, died December 26, 1859), known in English as Chainbreaker to his own people or Governor Blacksnake to the European settlers, was a Seneca war chief and political leader. Along with other Haudenosaunee war chiefs (most notably Mohawk leader Joseph Brant), he led warriors to fight on the side of the British during the American Revolutionary War from 1777 to 1783. He was prominent for his role at the Battle of Oriskany, in which the Loyalist and allied forces ambushed a force of Patriots. After the war, he supported his maternal uncle, Handsome Lake, as a prominent religious leader. Chainbreaker allied with the United States in the War of 1812 and later encouraged some accommodation to European-American settlers, allowing missionaries and teachers on the Seneca reservation.

Importantly, he also led a successful postwar struggle in New York in the 1850s after white men illegally bought Seneca land. He helped gain a New York State Appeals Court ruling in 1861 that restored the Oil Springs Reservation to the Seneca.

== Early life ==
Chainbreaker was born near Seneca Lake in western New York in the Seneca/Cayuga village of Kendaia (Apple Town). His mother was a Seneca woman of the Wolf clan and his father was known as De-ne-oh-ah-te or "The Light." In the matrilineal kinship system of the Haudenosaunee nations, a child is born into his or her mother's clan and gains social status from her family. The maternal uncles were very influential in the child's life, especially the oldest brother of the mother.

He was raised in Canawaugus, a Seneca village known as Ga:non'wagês (in the Seneca language), on the east side of the Genesee River, a site that has since been absorbed into the village of Avon, Livingston County, New York. The war chief Cornplanter and Royaner Handsome Lake were his maternal uncles and also lived at Ga:non'wagês. The Wolf Clan's traditional function for males of the Seneca was to serve as war chiefs.

His birth date has been given variously from circa 1760 to as early as 1737 (as is claimed on his gravestone, which was erected in 1930; the gravestone also erroneously states that he supported the Continental Army during the Revolution). A 1737 birthdate would have made him 121 or 122 years old at the time of death; some historians do not believe this is likely, as only one other person, Jeanne Calment, has been documented to have lived more than 120 years. Chainbreaker was known to have lived an exceptionally long life, at least reaching the age of 100. He likely became recognized as a war chief for actions taken as a young adult. According to the historian Draper, Chainbreaker said he was two years old at the time of William Johnson's defeat of the French on Lake George in 1755, and 22 at the time of the 1775 Battle of Bunker Hill. His death on December 26, 1859, was well documented.

In his youth, Chainbreaker accompanied his uncle Cornplanter "on special missions to see General George Washington as well as to members of the Continental Congress".

After the Revolutionary War, in 1788 Chainbreaker moved to the large area of land in Pennsylvania granted to his uncle Cornplanter for his service by the state legislature. Converted to his uncle Handsome Lake's religion, Chainbreaker became an active promoter of traditional ways. In 1803, he moved with Handsome Lake to nearby Coldspring after a dispute with Cornplanter.

While Chainbreaker continued to advocate "temperance, morality, and adherence to the overall principles of Handsome Lake," he rejected his uncle's "proscription against Indian participation in the 'white man's wars." By the 1840s Chainbreaker had formulated his own version of his uncle's traditional ways. He generally urged finding a path of compromise. He permitted missionaries and Western schooling on the Reservation and encouraged his followers to work toward social harmony and to take advantage of schooling.

== Involvement in regional warfare ==
In 1777 Chainbreaker took part in the siege of Fort Stanwix and the Battle of Oriskany in British General St. Leger's part of the Saratoga campaign. In 1778 he participated in the Battle of Wyoming under the command of Colonel John Butler. In 1779 he attempted to defend Seneca settlements against the raid of Colonel Daniel Brodhead. Blacksnake carried messages for the British on a trail that passed through today's Napoli, New York.

After his work on behalf of the British in the Revolutionary War, Chainbreaker became reconciled to the fact that United States had established independence and had forced the Seneca and other Haudenosaunee nations from most of their lands. He fought on the American side in the War of 1812, and participated in the Battle of Fort George.

== Struggle for Oil Spring Reservation ==
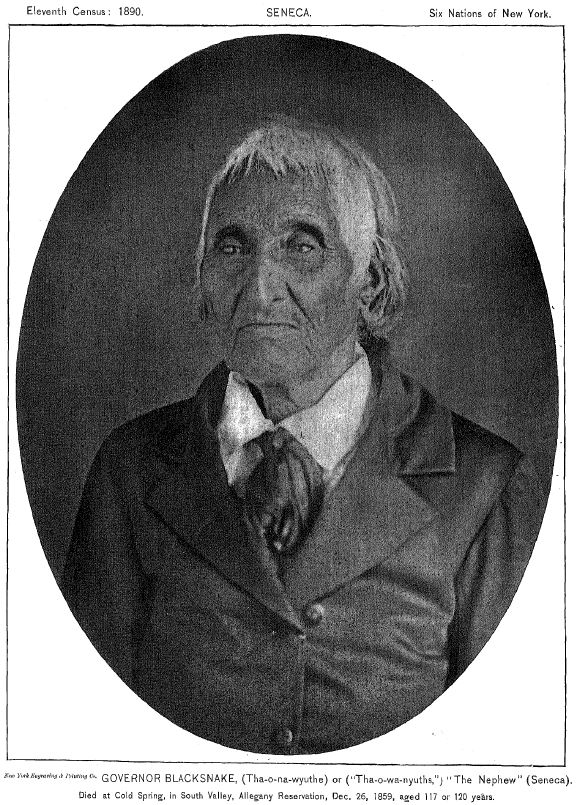
Photograph of Governor Blacksnake, (Tha-o-na-wyuthe) or ("Tha--o-wa-nyuths,") "The Nephew" (Seneca).

Governor Blacksnake "helped save the Oil Spring Reserve" for the Seneca. His victory in this New York State court case established a precedent for the land claim settled in June 2005 over Cuba Lake.

After the war, American colonists Stanley Clark, Benjamin Chamberlain, and William Gallagher bought lands adjacent to the Seneca Oil Spring Reservation. Clark surveyed Reservation lands and claimed the area for the three men, granting one-quarter of the reservation to Horatio Seymour, later elected as governor of New York. In the 1850s, Clark conveyed another quarter to Philonius Pattison.

In response to these actions, the Seneca filed a legal challenge that reached the New York Court of Appeals, Seneca Nation of Indians v. Philonus Pattison. They protested against the Seymour, Gallagher, Chamberlain, and Clark claims to the northeast quarter of Oil Spring.

Governor Blacksnake, who had attended the negotiations of the Treaty of Big Tree that established the reservation, testified that he and Joseph Ellicott had surveyed the Oil Spring lands and that the omission of a full legal description of the lands from the treaty was a mistake. He produced a map copied by the Holland Land Company, in which the Oil Spring Reservation was marked similarly to other Seneca lands.

In 1861, the Court found for the Seneca Nation. Pattison, Chamberlain, Clark, Gallagher, and Seymour were forced to leave the reservation. While later incursions by the New York State Board of Canal Commissioners and tourist activities have taken additional land from the Reservation, Governor Blacksnake's actions helped preserve some of Oil Spring as Seneca land.

== Later life ==
In later life, Chainbreaker's political influence waned, as younger Seneca men assumed control. But he continued to participate in the condolence ceremony into his nineties.

Chainbreaker died on the Allegany Reservation in Cattaraugus County, New York in late December 1859. He is remembered by the Seneca Nation as "a man of rare intellectual and moral power."
