= Third Treaty of Buffalo Creek =

1842 treaty between the United States and Seneca

The Third Treaty of Buffalo Creek or Treaty with the Seneca of 1842 signed by the U.S. and the Seneca Nation modified the Second Treaty of Buffalo Creek. This reflected that the Ogden Company had purchased only two of the four Seneca reservations, the Buffalo Creek and Tonawanda reservations, that the Senecas had agreed to sell in the Second Treaty; it thus restored native title to the Allegany, Cattaraugus and Oil Springs reservations.

A statement in the ninth article of the treaty prohibits the assessment of property tax on native lands until they are sold to non-native owners. Said article states:

The parties to this compact mutually agree to solicit the influence of the Government of the United States to protect such of the lands of the Seneca Indians, within the State of New York, as may from time to time remain in their possession from all taxes, and assessments for roads, highways, or any other purpose until such lands shall be sold and conveyed by the said Indians, and the possession thereof shall have been relinquished by them.

Two results have arisen from this treaty. The first is that the Seneca nation has refused to sell any land to non-Indians within its territory. One side effect of this is that the city of Salamanca, which is mostly on the Allegany Reservation but occupied by a large number of non-native residents, operates on a lease system in which any non-native property holder must sign a lease with the nation acknowledging the tribe's ownership of the land and, since the 1990s, also any improvements built upon that land. The second is that the Seneca Nation asserts that this treaty clause is not limited to taxes on land (property taxes), but to any and all taxes, including excise tax and sales tax, from any activity on the reservations; this interpretation forms the basis of the Senecas' convenience store industry, which has a built-in price advantage over non-native competitors due to the tribe's assertion that they do not have to pay excise tax. (The Senecas do not extend these advantages to non-native businesses or residents; any non-native leasing space on the reservation must still pay excise, sales and property tax to state, county, city and school authorities.)

== See also ==
- Treaty of Canandaigua
- Treaty of Big Tree
- First Treaty of Buffalo Creek (1788)
- Second Treaty of Buffalo Creek (1838)
- Fourth Treaty of Buffalo Creek (1857)
