= Tonawanda Reservation =

Tonawanda Reservation Ta꞉nöwödeʼ (Seneca) Tonawanda Creek Reservation
- Indian reservation
- Location of Tonawanda Reservation in New York

- Location of New York in the United States
- Coordinates: 43°04′05″N 78°26′42″W
- Country: United States
- State: New York
- Counties: Erie, Genesee, and Niagara

Government
  - Type: Traditional government
  - Body: Tonawanda Seneca Nation

Area
  - Total: 0.80 sq mi (2.07 km^{2})
  - Land: 0.80 sq mi (2.07 km^{2})
  - Water: 0 sq mi (0.00 km^{2})

Population (2010)
  - Total: 2,662
- Demonym: Ta:nöwödé:onö’
- Time zone: UTC-5 (EST)
  - Summer (DST): UTC-4 (EDT)
- Area code: 716

The Tonawanda Indian Reservation (Seneca: Ta꞉nöwödeʼ) is an Indian reservation of the Tonawanda Seneca Nation located in western New York, United States. The band is a federally recognized tribe and, in the 2010 census, had 693 people living on the reservation, known as the Ta:nöwödé:onö’. The reservation lies mostly in Genesee County, extending into Erie and Niagara counties. It is bordered by the Towns of Alabama, Pembroke, Newstead, and Royalton.

The Tonawanda Reservation is also known as the Tonawanda Creek Reservation. Currently, it has more than a half dozen businesses located on Bloomingdale Road within the reservation. Several sell untaxed, low-price cigarettes and gasoline. Other businesses sell Seneca craft goods, groceries, and prepared food.

== History ==
After various cultures of indigenous peoples succeeded each other in the Great Lakes area, in late prehistoric times, the five nations of the Haudenosaunee coalesced. Before the mid-14th century, they had formed the Haudenosaunee Confederacy, with the Seneca people forming its westernmost constituent nation. The current location of the Tonawanda Reservation is believed to be close to the likely poorly defined border between the historic Seneca homeland and its rivals, the Neutral Nation that occupied the Niagara Region at the time of French missionary Joseph de La Roche Daillon's arrival in the area in 1627.

The Haudenosaunee pledged allegiance to the British Crown in the Nanfan Treaty. During the French and Indian War, the Haudenosaunee and British defeated New France; the Haudenosaunee and other native territory was placed in a massive Indian Reserve. During the American Revolutionary War, most of the Haudenosaunee sided with the British Crown, as they hoped to end colonial encroachment; to this effect, the Haudenosaunee led several massacres on colonial settlements, which provoked the Continental Army to respond with the scorched-earth Sullivan Expedition, wiping out much of the Senecas' already destitute homelands. After the Crown's defeat, some of the Seneca, along with other Haudenosaunee, migrated with Joseph Brant to the Grand River reservation in the still British-controlled territory of upper Canada (now known as the province of Ontario).

Those majority of the Seneca People remained in what is now western New York, subsequently were forced to ceding lands through the Canandaigua Treaty of 1794 and the Treaty of Big Tree in 1797 which led to the reservations in western New York, which are only a fraction of their original reservation. Most Reservation land after the Treaty were often violated by the state and today the boundaries have been reduced after illegal sales to White settlers and also the construction of the dam in Allegheny reservation which led to most arable land being swallowed by the Dam. Most of these were done without the permission of the Tribe.

In 1848, the Seneca Nation of Indians was formed to represent the Seneca as a federally recognized tribe. Due to a dispute over one of the Treaties of Buffalo Creek, where as the Seneca Indians wanted a republican form of government and the Tonawanda wanted a Traditional form of Government, the Tonawanda Band of Seneca Indians was formed in 1857 to represent the Tonawanda territory. In contrast to the Seneca Nation of Indians, which uses an American-style republican form of government, the Tonawanda Band of Seneca Indians preserves the traditional Seneca practices, including selection of life chiefs by heritage.

The Seneca of this reservation worked with self-taught anthropologist Lewis H. Morgan in mid century to teach him about Haudenosaunee kinship and social structures. He published the results of his work in 1851 as The League of the Ho-de-no-sau-nee or Iroquois. His insights about the significance and details of kinship structure in Native American societies influenced much following anthropological and ethnological research. Much of the information was provided by his colleague and friend Ely S. Parker, a Seneca born on the reservation in 1828. Morgan dedicated his book to Parker and credited him with their joint research.

Over the years, the size of the reservation had been reduced by forced sales of land by the state of New York to surrounding communities. The reservation is also noticeably more racially integrated than most Seneca Nation of Indians territories (excluding Salamanca, which operates on a lease system); whereas the Seneca Nation has actively resisted non-native settlement of its territories because of the past policy whereby white settlement meant that the tribe lost that parcel of land to Non Natives without their permission who often used it for farming. Tonawanda Band has been somewhat more tolerant of allowing non-natives to live on its territory.

== Geography ==
According to the United States Census Bureau, the part in Niagara County has a total area of 0.8 mi^{2} (2.1 km^{2}) and none of the area is covered with water. The Census Bureau reports the part of the reservation in Genesee County has a total area of 9.3 mi^{2} (24.0 km^{2}). 9.2 mi^{2} (23.8 km^{2}) of it is land and 0.1 mi^{2} (0.2 km^{2}) of it (0.76%) is water. The Census Bureau reports the part in Erie County has a total area of 1.8 mi^{2} (4.8 km^{2}). None of the area is covered with water.

The Tonawanda Creek flows through the entire reservation to the Niagara River, separating the part in Niagara County from the parts in Erie and Genesee counties. The river constitutes a barrier. Together with the absence of paved roads, these factors limit the population in this part of the reservation.

The northern boundary of the reservation's Niagara County portion is part of the Tonawanda Wildlife Management Area.

== Demographics ==
Historical population
Census	Pop.	Note	%±
2010	34		—
2020	20		−41.2%

The United States Census Bureau compiles separate demographic data for each county's portion of the reservation.

=== Erie County ===
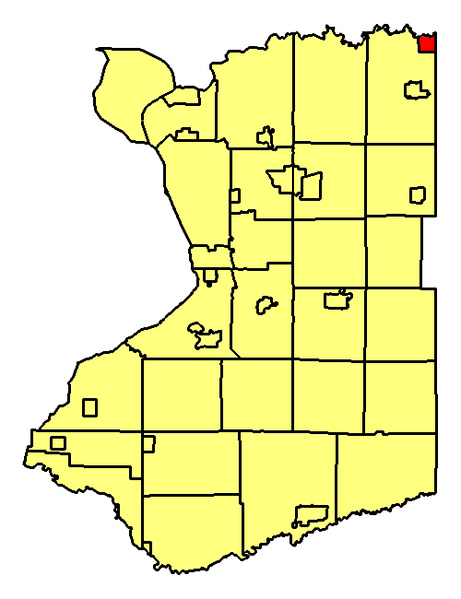
Location of Erie County's portion of Tonawanda Reservation

As of the census of 2010, there were 34 people, 9 households, and 7 families living in the Indian reservation. The population density was 18.4 people per square mile (11.4/km^{2}). There were 9 housing units at an average density of 2.7/mi^{2} (1.0/km^{2}).

There were 9 households, out of which three consisted of a married couple living together and two were made of a single individual. One household had someone living alone who was 65 years of age or older. The average household size was 3.78 and the average family size was 4.43.

The age distribution was eighteen person under the age of 20, four people from 20 to 24, nine people from 25 to 44, one person from 45 to 64, and three persons 65 years of age or older. The median age was 19.5 years. Nineteen of the reservation's residents were female and fifteen were male.

The median income for a household in the Indian reservation was $21,250. The per capita income for the Indian reservation is $20,950. None of the population were below the poverty line. Median incomes per family were not reported. <-Figures specific to the Tonawanda Reservation is not included in the 2000 or 2010 census data. What was the source?

=== Genesee County ===
As of the census of 2000, there were 533 people, 186 households, and 121 families living in the Indian reservation. The population density was 58.0/mi^{2} (22.4/km^{2}). There were 192 housing units at an average density of 20.9/mi^{2} (8.1/km^{2}). The racial makeup of the Indian reservation was 52.53% White, 2.63% Black or African American, 39.40% Native American, 0.19% Pacific Islander, 2.44% from other races, and 2.81% from two or more races. Hispanic or Latino of any race were 4.88% of the population.

There were 86 households, out of which 32.3% had children under the age of 18 living with them, 44.6% were married couples living together, 13.4% had a female householder with no husband present, and 34.9% were non-families. 27.4% of all households were made up of individuals, and 10.8% had someone living alone who was 65 years of age or older. The average household size was 2.87 and the average family size was 3.49.

The age distribution was 29.8% under the age of 18, 9.9% from 18 to 24, 26.3% from 25 to 44, 21.0% from 45 to 64, and 12.9% who were 65 years of age or older. The median age was 35 years. For every 100 females, there were 97.4 males. For every 100 females age 18 and over, there were 84.2 males.

The median income for a household in the Indian reservation was $25,208, and the median income for a family was $36,563. Males had a median income of $31,250 versus $12,159 for females. The per capita income for the Indian reservation was $12,201. About 12.3% of families and 16.1% of the population were below the poverty line, including 16.5% of those under age 18 and 16.1% of those age 65 or over.

=== Niagara County ===
As of the census of 2010, there are no people living in the location.

== Education ==
Residents living on the Tonawanda Reservation are included in the Akron Central School District.

== See also ==
- Tonawanda Band of Seneca Indians
