= Treaties of Buffalo Creek =

The Treaties of Buffalo Creek are a series of treaties, named for the Buffalo River in New York, between the United States and Haudenosaunee peoples:

These include the following:

- First Treaty of Buffalo Creek (1788)
- Second Treaty of Buffalo Creek (1838)
- Third Treaty of Buffalo Creek (1842)
- Fourth Treaty of Buffalo Creek (1857)
