= Treaty of Canandaigua =

1794 treaty between the United States and Haudenosaunee

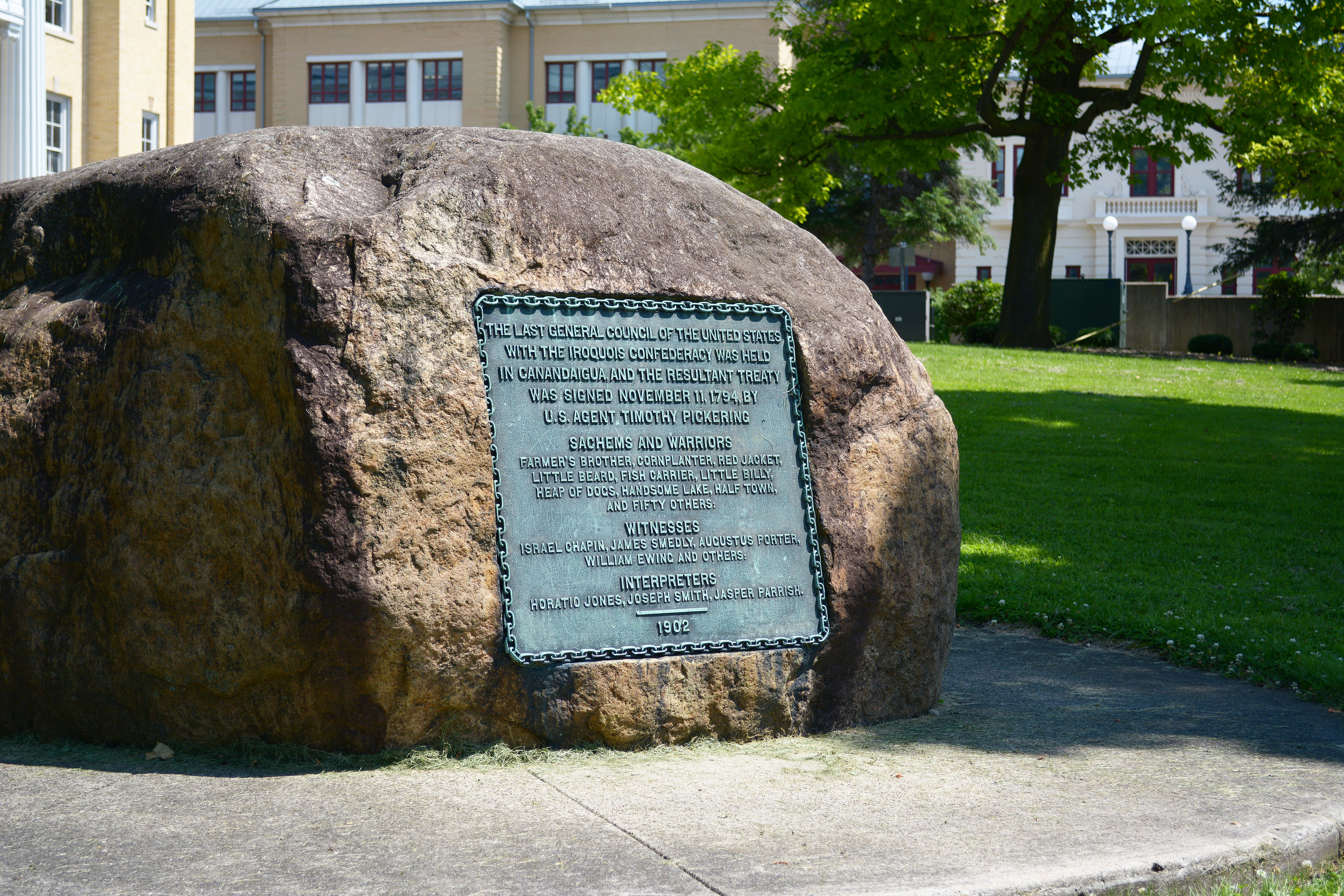
- Signed: November 11, 1794
- Location: Canandaigua, New York
- Signatories: 50 Rotiyaneson and War Chiefs of the Haudenosaunee; Timothy Pickering for the U.S.
- Parties: Six Nations of the Haudenosaunee (Iroquois); United States

The Treaty of Canandaigua (or Konondaigua, as spelled in the treaty itself), also known as the Pickering Treaty and the Calico Treaty, is a treaty signed after the American Revolutionary War between the Grand Council of the Six Nations and President George Washington, representing the United States of America.

It was signed at Canandaigua, New York, on November 11, 1794, by fifty royaner (hoya:ne:h) and war chiefs representing the Grand Council of the Six Nations of the Haudenosaunee (Iroquois) Confederacy (including the Cayuga, Mohawk, Oneida, Onondaga, Seneca and Tuscarora Nations) and by Timothy Pickering, official agent of President Washington.

== Background of the treaty ==
The Treaty of Canandaigua arose from geo-political tensions following the American Revolutionary War. Britain's defeat forced it to relinquish land east of the Mississippi River to the United States, but its original rights to that territory were disputed, causing resentment among the Haudenosaunee Confederacy, to whom the land originally belonged. Some indigenous peoples on the western frontier remained loyal to Britain and were hostile toward the United States. The United States faced both Haudenosaunee resentment over its acceptance of Ohio Valley land from Britain and the threat of renewed frontier conflict.

To avoid war, the United States sought to establish a firm western boundary and recognized that Haudenosaunee neutrality was essential. Two earlier attempts at peace the treaties of Fort Stanwix and Fort Harmar were considered failures by the United States government, as both increased rather than reduced tensions.

Henry Knox, the United States secretary of war, launched a military operation on the western frontier in September 1790 and appointed Timothy Pickering as Indian commissioner to address Haudenosaunee grievances. Pickering pursued a "strategy of conciliation and compromise", beginning with a conference with the Seneca Nation. When Knox's military efforts faltered in October 1791, he proposed enlisting the Haudenosaunee to fight alongside the United States; Pickering and the confederacy declined. By 1793, the frontier conflict had escalated into open war in the Ohio Valley.

In June 1794, the Haudenosaunee Confederacy proposed a conference at Buffalo Creek, at which they rejected the Fort Harmar and Fort Stanwix treaties. The United States ceded land to the Seneca Nation as a result. Fearing that the confederacy would join the western opposition, the United States convened the first conference for the Treaty of Canandaigua in September 1794.

The official conference began on October 18, 1794, with more than 1,500 Haudenosaunee members present. Deliberations were initially tense due to differing cultural views on treaties. According to scholar Granville Ganter, "Unlike their Anglo counterparts, the Haudenosaunee saw treaty agreements as requiring constant renewal and upkeep. The term they used was 'brightening the chain of friendship'". Seneca leader Red Jacket played an integral role in bridging these differences, reminding Pickering that peace requires language of peace, not blame.

Another point of difference was the role of women. No United States settler women participated in the dialogue; Haudenosaunee women, in keeping with their significant role in tribal governance, were included. Historian Joan M. Jensen states that Seneca women "spoke during the negotiations of the Treaty of 1794 with the United States government".

The conference ended on November 11, 1794, when fifty-nine war chiefs and royaner signed the treaty. The text, comprising seven articles, was submitted to the U.S. Senate on January 2, 1795, under the title: "The Six Nations, and Oneida, Tuscarora, and Stockbridge Tribes'".

== Terms of the treaty ==
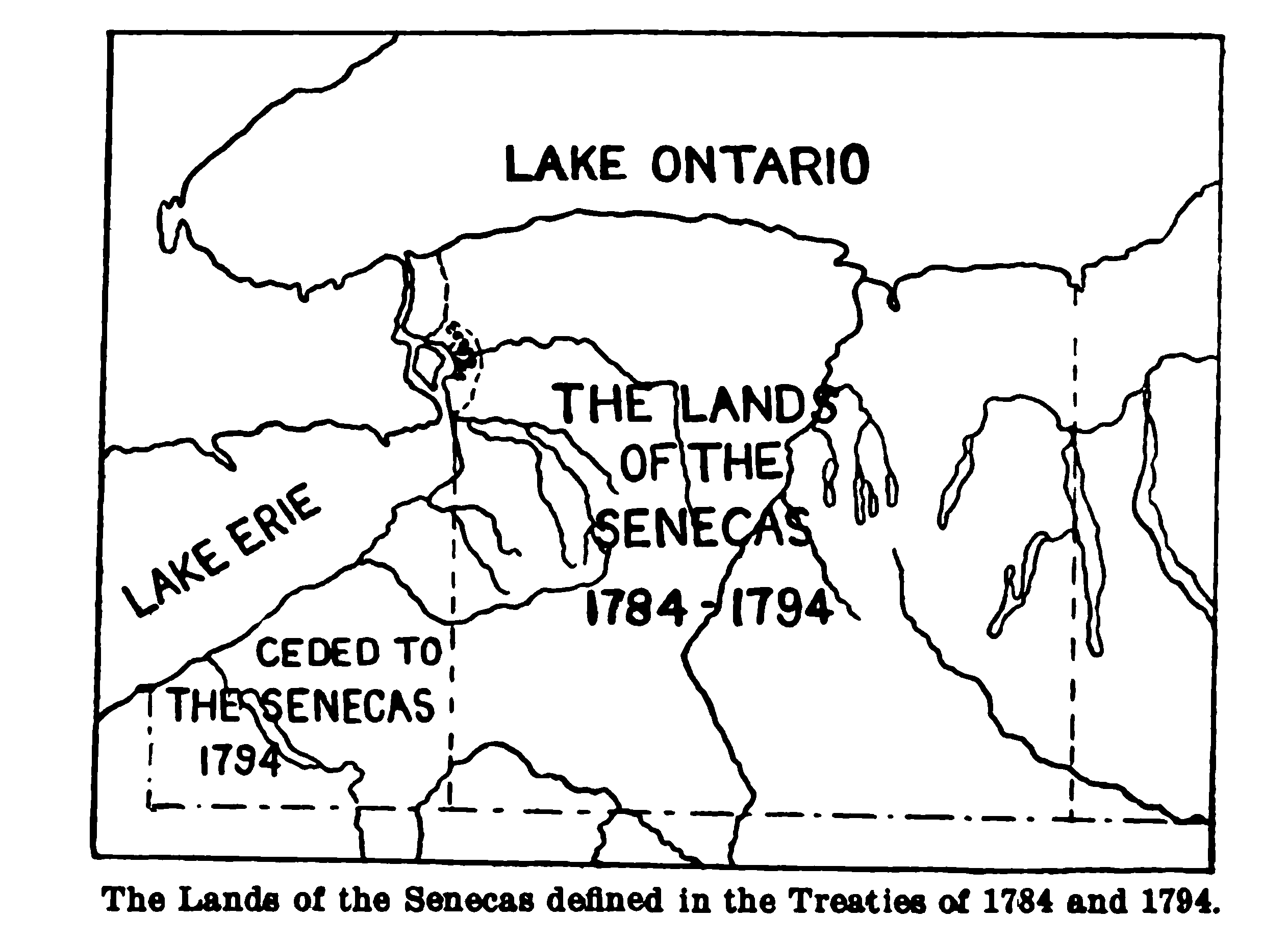
Territory of the Seneca Nation in 1794

The treaty established peace and friendship between the United States of America and the Six Nations and affirmed Haudenosaunee land rights in the state of New York, and the boundaries established by the Phelps and Gorham Purchase of 1788.

Article One of the treaty promises “perpetual peace and friendship” between America and the Haudenosaunee Confederacy. Article Two acknowledges lands belonging to the Oneida, Onondoga, and Cayuga, and gives them the legal right to sell the land if they so wish and Article Three legally defines the perimeter of Seneca territories. Article Four maintains that America must not “claim or disturb” any lands belonging to the Haudenosaunee Confederacy. Article Five legally acknowledges that the road from “Fort Schlosser to Lake Erie, as far south as Buffalo Creek” belongs to the Seneca Nation. Article Six promises $4,500 each year to the Haudenosaunee Confederacy from America. Article Seven states that if the “perpetual peace and friendship” between the Haudenosaunee Confederacy and America were disturbed in any way, the conflict would be resolved peacefully by a third party.

== Legacy ==
=== Current status ===
Article Six of the treaty continues to be honored by the contracting parties. It provides that the U.S. government annually provide goods valued at $4,500. To date, Haudenosaunee leaders have insisted that the payment be made with bolts of cloth, rather than cash, as a means of adhering to the terms of the largely dishonored treaty.

The U.S. government dishonored Article Two, which ensured that the land rights of the Oneida, Onondaga, and Cayuga nations would be protected by the U.S. government against state interference. By the early 19th century, federal Indian agents were "deeply involved" in furthering a federal policy of depriving the Oneida people of their Article Two rights to the quiet enjoyment of their treaty lands by both failing to prevent New York from purchasing treaty lands and actively "encouraging the removal of the Oneidas... to the west." By 1920, the Oneida Nation retained only 32 acres (13 ha) of treaty land, down from the six million acres (2,400,000 ha) held before the American Revolution.

The Oneida Nation of Wisconsin was still receiving an annuity check of $1,800 as late as 1941, almost 150 years after the treaty took effect.

=== Quakers ===
The Quakers were involved in the aftermath of the treaty. Pickering appointed the Quakers to teach the Haudenosaunee Confederacy “European-style agriculture”. The Friends’ Review, a Quaker publication, recalls “ploughs, axes, and hoes” being “liberally” supplied to the Haudenosaunee Confederacy. The treaty has had a lasting legacy in asserting the sovereignty of the Haudenosaunee Confederacy; historian Robert W. Venables states that “from 1794 to the present day, the treaty has been the legal keystones of relations between the United States and the Six Nations of the Iroquois Confederacy. The treaty is at the center of any of the Six Nation’s land claims and their rights to govern their own reservations”. The sovereignty and autonomy established in the treaty was also reaffirmed in the State Papers of the London Review of 1796, stating that anyone is able to “freely to pass and repass” through the territory addressed in the treaty, while recognizing the friendship established by the treaty itself.

=== Signatories ===
The treaty was signed by fifty royaner and war chiefs.

Notable signatories include:

- Ki-ant-whau-ka (Corn Planter)
- Kon-ne-at-or-tee-ooh (Handsome Lake)
- Se-quid-ong-guee (Little Beard)
- Sog-goo-ya-waut-hau (Red Jacket)
- Honayawus (Farmer's Brother) (see: Battle of Devil's Hole)
- Timothy Pickering
Treaty of Canandaigua

To us it is more than a contract, more than a symbol;
to us the 1794 Treaty is a way of life.

— George Heron

== See also ==
- Treaty of Big Tree
- Treaties of Buffalo Creek
- List of treaties

== Sources ==
- Campisi, Jack; Starna, William (1995). "On the Road to Canandaigua: The Treaty of 1794". American Indian Quarterly. 19 (4): 467–490. doi:10.2307/1185560. JSTOR 1185560.
- Ganter, Granville (2009). ""Make Your Minds Perfectly Easy": Sagoyewatha and the Great Law of the Haudenosaunee". Early American Literature. 44 (1): 121–146. doi:10.1353/eal.0.0040. S2CID 159633309.
- Hauptman, Laurence M. (2001). Conspiracy of Interests: Iroquois Dispossession and the Rise of New York State. Syracuse University Press. ISBN 978-0-8156-0712-0.
- Kappler, Charles J. (1904). Indian affairs: laws and treaties. Vol. 2 (Treaties). Washington, DC. pp. 34–37.
- Jemison, G. Peter; Schein, Anna M.; Powless, Irving Jr., eds. (2000). Treaty of Canandaigua 1794: 200 Years of Treaty Relations Between the Iroquois Confederacy and the United States. Clear Light Publishing. ISBN 978-1-57416-052-9.
