= Cattaraugus =

Cattaraugus (an Iroquoian word roughly translated to "foul-smelling banks") may refer to:

Places

- Cattaraugus, New York
- Cattaraugus County, New York
- Cattaraugus Creek, a tributary of Lake Erie in New York
- Cattaraugus Reservation, one of the two major reservations of the Seneca Nation of New York
  - Cattaraugus Reservation, Cattaraugus County, New York
  - Cattaraugus Reservation, Chautauqua County, New York
  - Cattaraugus Reservation, Erie County, New York
- Canawaugus, a former Seneca village in Livingston County, New York, using an alternate pronunciation and spelling

Other

- Cattaraugus Cutlery Company
