= Irish Brook (Rice Brook tributary) =

Stream in New York, USA

Irish Brook Tributary to Rice Brook
- Location of Irish Brook mouth Irish Brook (Rice Brook tributary) (the United States)

Location
- Country: United States
- State: New York
- County: Cattaraugus

Physical characteristics
- Source: divide of Rice Brook
  - location: about 5 miles west-northwest of Limestone, New York
  - coordinates: 42°02′25.00″N 078°41′20.00″W
  - elevation: 2,000 ft (610 m)
- Mouth: Rice Brook
  - location: about 3 miles northwest of Limestone, New York
  - coordinates: 42°03′4.23″N 078°39′36.10″W
  - elevation: 1,457 ft (444 m)
- Length: 1.71 mi (2.75 km)
- Basin size: 1.73 square miles (4.5 km^{2})
- Discharge
  - location: Rice Brook
  - average: 3.59 cu ft/s (0.102 m^{3}/s) at mouth with Rice Brook

Basin features
- Progression: Rice Brook → Tunungwant Creek → Allegheny River → Ohio River → Mississippi River → Gulf of Mexico
- River system: Allegheny River
- Tributaries
  - left: unnamed tributaries
  - right: unnamed tributaries
- Bridges: Irish Brook Road

Irish Brook is a 1.71 mi (2.75 km) long first-order tributary to Rice Brook.

== Course ==
Irish Brook rises about 5 miles (8.0 km) west-northwest of Limestone, New York in Cattaraugus County and then flows generally northeast to meet Rice Brook about 3 miles (4.8 km) northwest of Limestone, New York.

== Watershed ==
Irish Brook drains 1.73 square miles (4.5 km^{2}) of area, receives about 45.2 in/year (115 cm/year) of precipitation, and is about 95.92% forested.

== See also ==
- List of rivers of New York
