= Latchaw Creek =

Stream in Pennsylvania, USA

Latchaw Creek Tributary to Tunungwant Creek
- Location of Latchaw Creek mouth Latchaw Creek (the United States)

Location
- Country: United States
- State: New York; Pennsylvania
- Counties: McKean (PA); Cattaraugus(NY)

Physical characteristics
- Source: Limestone Brook divide
  - location: about 2 miles southwest of Limestone, New York
  - coordinates: 42°00′33.12″N 078°39′15.23″W
  - elevation: 2,140 ft (650 m)
- Mouth: Tunungwant Creek
  - location: about 1 mile north-northwest of Foster Brook, Pennsylvania
  - coordinates: 41°59′34.23″N 078°37′30.10″W
  - elevation: 1,401 ft (427 m)
- Length: 2.99 mi (4.81 km)
- Basin size: 1.69 square miles (4.4 km^{2})
- Discharge
  - location: Tunungwant Creek
  - average: 3.25 cu ft/s (0.092 m^{3}/s) at mouth with Tunungwant Creek

Basin features
- Progression: Tunungwant Creek → Allegheny River → Ohio River → Mississippi River → Gulf of Mexico
- River system: Allegheny River
- Tributaries
  - left: unnamed tributaries
  - right: unnamed tributaries
- Bridges: Camp Road, unnamed road (x3), Latchaw Hollow Road, Seaward Avenue

Latchaw Creek is a 2.99 mi (4.81 km) long first-order tributary to Tunungwant Creek. This is the only stream of this name in the United States.

== Variant names ==
According to the Geographic Names Information System, it has also been known historically as:

- Latchaw Run

== Course ==
Latchaw Creek rises about 2 miles (3.2 km) southwest of Limestone, New York in Cattaraugus County and then flows generally southeast into McKean County, Pennsylvania to meet Tunungwant Creek about 1-mile north-northwest of Foster Brook, Pennsylvania.

== Watershed ==
Latchaw Creek drains 1.69 square miles (4.4 km^{2}) of area, receives about 44.18 in/year (112.2 cm/year) of precipitation, and is about 94.03% forested.

== See also ==
- List of rivers of New York
- List of rivers of Pennsylvania
