= Nichols Run (Tunungwant Creek tributary) =

Stream in New York, USA

Nichols Run Tributary to Tunungwant Creek
- Location of Nichols Run mouth Nichols Run (Tunungwant Creek tributary) (the United States)

Location
- Country: United States
- State: New York
- County: Cattaraugus

Physical characteristics
- Source: divide of Harrisburg Run
  - location: about 1 mile west of Harrisburg, New York
  - coordinates: 42°00′46.23″N 078°33′43.09″W
  - elevation: 2,105 ft (642 m)
- Mouth: Tunungwant Creek
  - location: Limestone, New York
  - coordinates: 42°01′38.23″N 078°38′1.10″W
  - elevation: 1,398 ft (426 m)
- Length: 3.73 mi (6.00 km)
- Basin size: 4.10 square miles (10.6 km^{2})
- Discharge
  - location: Tunungwant Creek
  - average: 7.88 cu ft/s (0.223 m^{3}/s) at mouth with Tunungwant Creek

Basin features
- Progression: Tunungwant Creek → Allegheny River → Ohio River → Mississippi River → Gulf of Mexico
- River system: Allegheny River
- Tributaries
  - left: unnamed tributaries
  - right: unnamed tributaries
- Bridges: Quinn Road, Nichols Run Road (x3), Main Street, US 219, Splitter Road

Nichols Run is a 3.73 mi (6.00 km) long first-order tributary to Tunungwant Creek.

== Course ==
Nichols Run rises about 1 mile (1.6 km) west of Harrisburg, New York in Cattaraugus County and then flows northwest to meet Tunungwant Creek in Limestone, New York.

== Watershed ==
Nichols Run drains 4.10 square miles (10.6 km^{2}) of area, receives about 44.6 in/year (113 cm/year) of precipitation, and is about 85.32% forested.

== See also ==
- List of rivers of New York
