= Lafferty Run (Kendall Creek tributary) =

Stream in Pennsylvania, USA

Lafferty Run Tributary to Kendall Creek
- Location of Lafferty Run mouth Lafferty Run (Kendall Creek tributary) (the United States)

Location
- Country: United States
- State: Pennsylvania
- County: McKean

Physical characteristics
- Source: Foster Brook divide
  - location: about 1 mile southwest of Red Rock, Pennsylvania
  - coordinates: 41°57′28.00″N 078°33′41.00″W
  - elevation: 2,020 ft (620 m)
- Mouth: Kendall Creek
  - location: about 2 miles east of Bradford, Pennsylvania
  - coordinates: 41°57′23.23″N 078°36′21.09″W
  - elevation: 1,467 ft (447 m)
- Length: 2.19 mi (3.52 km)
- Basin size: 1.49 square miles (3.9 km^{2})
- Discharge
  - location: Kendall Creek
  - average: 2.93 cu ft/s (0.083 m^{3}/s) at mouth with Kendall Creek

Basin features
- Progression: Kendall Creek → Tunungwant Creek → Allegheny River → Ohio River → Mississippi River → Gulf of Mexico
- River system: Allegheny River
- Tributaries
  - left: unnamed tributaries
  - right: unnamed tributaries
- Bridges: Red Rock Ridge Road, Lafferty Hollow (x3)

Lafferty Run is a 2.19 mi (3.52 km) long first-order tributary to Kendall Creek.

== Course ==
Lafferty Run rises about 1 mile (1.6 km) southwest of Red Rock, Pennsylvania and then flows west-northwest to meet Kendall Creek about 2 miles (3.2 km) east of Bradford, Pennsylvania.

== Watershed ==
Lafferty Run drains 1.49 square miles (3.9 km^{2}) of area, receives about 44.2 in/year (112 cm/year) of precipitation, and is about 94.30% forested.

== See also ==
- List of rivers of Pennsylvania
