= Rice Brook (Tunungwant Creek tributary) =

Stream in New York, USA

Rice Brook Tributary to Tunungwant Creek
- Location of Rice Brook mouth Rice Brook (Tunungwant Creek tributary) (the United States)

Location
- Country: United States
- State: New York
- County: Cattaraugus

Physical characteristics
- Source: divide of Carrollton Run
  - location: about 6 miles northwest of Limestone, New York
  - coordinates: 42°04′20.00″N 078°41′9.00″W
  - elevation: 2,150 ft (660 m)
- Mouth: Tunungwant Creek
  - location: about 3 miles north of Limestone, New York
  - coordinates: 42°03′40.23″N 078°38′28.10″W
  - elevation: 1,281 ft (390 m)
- Length: 4.22 mi (6.79 km)
- Basin size: 5.95 square miles (15.4 km^{2})
- Discharge
  - location: Tunungwant Creek
  - average: 11.88 cu ft/s (0.336 m^{3}/s) at mouth with Tunungwant Creek

Basin features
- Progression: Tunungwant Creek → Allegheny River → Ohio River → Mississippi River → Gulf of Mexico
- River system: Allegheny River
- Tributaries
  - left: unnamed tributaries
  - right: Irish Brook
- Bridges: Rice Brook Road, Irish Brook Road, Rice Brook Road, Parkside Drive

Rice Brook is a 4.22 mi (6.79 km) long second-order tributary to Tunungwant Creek.

== Course ==
Rice Brook rises about 6 miles (9.7 km) northwest of Limestone, New York in Cattaraugus County and then flows south and turns generally east to meet Tunungwant Creek about 3 miles (4.8 km) north of Limestone, New York.

== Watershed ==
Rice Brook drains 5.95 square miles (15.4 km^{2}) of area, receives about 45.2 in/year (115 cm/year) of precipitation, and is about 95.03% forested.

== See also ==
- List of rivers of New York
