= Leonard Brook (Tunungwant Creek tributary) =

Stream in New York, USA

Leonard Brook Tributary to Tunungwant Creek
- Location of Leonard Brook mouth Leonard Brook (Tunungwant Creek tributary) (the United States)

Location
- Country: United States
- State: New York
- County: Cattaraugus

Physical characteristics
- Source: divide of Flatstone Creek
  - location: about 3 miles east of Limestone, New York
  - coordinates: 42°01′39.23″N 078°38′21.10″W
  - elevation: 2,120 ft (650 m)
- Mouth: Tunungwant Creek
  - location: about 1.5 miles north of Limestone, New York
  - coordinates: 42°03′3.23″N 078°38′21.10″W
  - elevation: 1,381 ft (421 m)
- Length: 3.39 mi (5.46 km)
- Basin size: 4.01 square miles (10.4 km^{2})
- Discharge
  - location: Tunungwant Creek
  - average: 7.48 cu ft/s (0.212 m^{3}/s) at mouth with Tunungwant Creek

Basin features
- Progression: Tunungwant Creek → Allegheny River → Ohio River → Mississippi River → Gulf of Mexico
- River system: Allegheny River
- Tributaries
  - left: unnamed tributaries
  - right: unnamed tributaries
- Bridges: Leonard Run Road (x2), Loney Hollow Road, N Main Street, US 219

Leonard Brook is a 3.39 mi (5.46 km) long first-order tributary to Tunungwant Creek.

== Course ==
Leonard Brook rises about 3 miles (4.8 km) east of Limestone, New York in Cattaraugus County and then flows northwest, west, and north to meet Tunungwant Creek about 1.5 miles (2.4 km) north of Limestone, New York.

== Watershed ==
Leonard Brook drains 4.01 square miles (10.4 km^{2}) of area, receives about 43.8 in/year (111 cm/year) of precipitation, and is about 85.18% forested.

== See also ==
- List of rivers of New York
