= Newtown, New York =

Newtown, New York may refer to:

- Elmhurst, Queens, New York, named Newtown prior 1897
- Elmira, New York, named Newtown prior to 1808
- A community on the Cattaraugus Reservation, Erie County, New York
