= Bailley Brook =

Stream in New York, USA

Bailley Brook Tributary to Tunungwant Creek
- Location of Bailley Brook mouth Bailley Brook (the United States)

Location
- Country: United States
- State: New York
- County: Cattaraugus

Physical characteristics
- Source: divide of Chipmunk Creek
  - location: about 3 miles northeast of Limestone, New York
  - coordinates: 42°03′42.23″N 078°36′30.10″W
  - elevation: 2,115 ft (645 m)
- Mouth: Tunungwant Creek
  - location: about 1.5 miles north of Limestone, New York
  - coordinates: 42°03′5.23″N 078°38′18.10″W
  - elevation: 1,381 ft (421 m)
- Length: 1.78 mi (2.86 km)
- Basin size: 1.17 square miles (3.0 km^{2})
- Discharge
  - location: Tunungwant Creek
  - average: 2.26 cu ft/s (0.064 m^{3}/s) at mouth with Tunungwant Creek

Basin features
- Progression: Tunungwant Creek → Allegheny River → Ohio River → Mississippi River → Gulf of Mexico
- River system: Allegheny River
- Tributaries
  - left: unnamed tributaries
  - right: unnamed tributaries
- Bridges: N Main Street, US 219

Bailley Brook is a 1.78 mi (2.86 km) long first-order tributary to Tunungwant Creek. It is the only stream of this name in the United States.

== Course ==
Bailley Brook rises about 3 miles (4.8 km) northeast of Limestone, New York in Cattaraugus County and then flows generally west to meet Tunungwant Creek about 1.5 miles (2.4 km) north of Limestone, New York.

== Watershed ==
Bailley Brook drains 1.17 square miles (3.0 km^{2}) of area, receives about 43.9 in/year (112 cm/year) of precipitation, and is about 93.64% forested.

== See also ==
- List of rivers of New York
