= Pennbrook Run =

Stream in Pennsylvania, USA

Pennbrook Run Tributary to Foster Brook
- Location of Pennbrook Run mouth Pennbrook Run (the United States)

Location
- Country: United States
- State: Pennsylvania; New York
- County: McKean

Physical characteristics
- Source: Chipmunk Creek divide
  - location: about 0.5 miles southwest of Nichols Run, New York
  - coordinates: 41°59′58.00″N 078°31′23.00″W
  - elevation: 2,170 ft (660 m)
- Mouth: Foster Brook
  - location: Gilmore, Pennsylvania
  - coordinates: 41°58′19.23″N 078°33′59.09″W
  - elevation: 1,591 ft (485 m)
- Length: 2.91 mi (4.68 km)
- Basin size: 3.20 square miles (8.3 km^{2})
- Discharge
  - location: Foster Brook
  - average: 6.49 cu ft/s (0.184 m^{3}/s) at mouth with Foster Brook

Basin features
- Progression: Foster Brook → Tunungwant Creek → Allegheny River → Ohio River → Mississippi River → Gulf of Mexico
- River system: Allegheny River
- Tributaries
  - left: unnamed tributaries
  - right: unnamed tributaries
- Bridges: Bells Camp Road (x3), PA 646 (x3)

Pennbrook Run is a 2.91 mi (4.68 km) long second-order tributary to Foster Brook. This is the only stream of this name in the United States.

== Variant names ==
According to the Geographic Names Information System, it has also been known historically as:

- Foster Brook

== Course ==
Pennbrook Run rises about 0.5 miles southwest of Nichols Run, New York and then flows southwest to meet Foster Brook at Gilmore, Pennsylvania.

== Watershed ==
Pennbrook Run drains 3.20 square miles (8.3 km^{2}) of area, receives about 45.2 in/year (115 cm/year) of precipitation, and is about 93.93% forested.

== See also ==
- List of rivers of Pennsylvania
