= Harrisburg Run =

Stream in Pennsylvania, USA

Harrisburg Run Tributary to Foster Brook
- Location of Harrisburg Run mouth Harrisburg Run (the United States)

Location
- Country: United States
- State: Pennsylvania; New York
- County: McKean (PA); Cattaraugus (NY)

Physical characteristics
- Source: Chipmunk Creek divide
  - location: west of Knapp Creek, New York
  - coordinates: 42°00′35.23″N 078°32′55.09″W
  - elevation: 2,115 ft (645 m)
- Mouth: Foster Brook
  - location: about 0.5 miles west of Derrick City, Pennsylvania
  - coordinates: 41°58′22.23″N 078°35′20.29″W
  - elevation: 1,490 ft (450 m)
- Length: 3.41 mi (5.49 km)
- Basin size: 4.02 square miles (10.4 km^{2})
- Discharge
  - location: Foster Brook
  - average: 7.98 cu ft/s (0.226 m^{3}/s) at mouth with Foster Brook

Basin features
- Progression: Foster Brook → Tunungwant Creek → Allegheny River → Ohio River → Mississippi River → Gulf of Mexico
- River system: Allegheny River
- Tributaries
  - left: unnamed tributaries
  - right: unnamed tributaries
- Bridges: Harrisburg Run Road (x2), unnamed road, Harrisburg Run Road

Harrisburg Run is a 3.41 mi (5.49 km) long first-order tributary to Foster Brook. This is the only stream of this name in the United States.

== Course ==
Harrisburg Run rises in Harrisburg, a small hamlet in the southwest corner of the town of Allegany in Cattaraugus County, New York, and then flows southwest in McKean County, Pennsylvania to meet Foster Brook about 0.5 miles (0.80 km) west of Derrick City, Pennsylvania.

== Watershed ==
Harrisburg Run drains 4.02 square miles (10.4 km^{2}) of area, receives about 45.2 in/year (115 cm/year) of precipitation, and is about 92.47% forested.

== See also ==
- List of rivers of Pennsylvania
- List of rivers of New York
