= Bolivar Run (Tunungwant Creek tributary) =

Stream in Pennsylvania, US

Bolivar Run Tributary to Tunungwant Creek
- Location of Bolivar Run mouth Bolivar Run (Tunungwant Creek tributary) (the United States)

Location
- Country: United States
- State: Pennsylvania
- County: McKean (PA); Cattaraugus (NY)

Physical characteristics
- Source: Bennett Branch divide
  - location: about 4 miles northwest of Bradford, Pennsylvania
  - coordinates: 42°00′7.23″N 078°41′44.11″W
  - elevation: 2,190 ft (670 m)
- Mouth: Tunungwant Creek
  - location: northside of Bradford, Pennsylvania
  - coordinates: 41°58′24.23″N 078°37′29.10″W
  - elevation: 1,421 ft (433 m)
- Length: 4.70 mi (7.56 km)
- Basin size: 5.42 square miles (14.0 km^{2})
- Discharge
  - location: Tunungwant Creek
  - average: 10.95 cu ft/s (0.310 m^{3}/s) at mouth with Tunungwant Creek

Basin features
- Progression: Tunungwant Creek → Allegheny River → Ohio River → Mississippi River → Gulf of Mexico
- River system: Allegheny River
- Tributaries
  - left: unnamed tributaries
  - right: unnamed tributaries
- Bridges: Bolivar Drive, Cross Drive, Bolivar Drive, Downing Drive, Colonial Heights Drive, Bigley Avenue, Seaward Avenue, US 219

Bolivar Run is a 4.70-mile-long (7.56 km) second-order tributary to Tunungwant Creek.

== Course ==
Bolivar Run rises about 4 miles (6.4 km) northwest of Bradford, Pennsylvania, and then flows southeast to meet Tunungwant Creek on the northside of Bradford, Pennsylvania.

== Watershed ==
Bolivar Run drains 5.42 square miles (14.0 km^{2}) of area, receives about 45.4 in/year (115 cm/year) of precipitation, and is about 87.36% forested.

== See also ==
- List of rivers of Pennsylvania
- List of rivers of New York
