= National Weather Service Buffalo, New York =

Weather forecast office serving Western New York

National Weather Service Weather Forecast Office Buffalo, New York

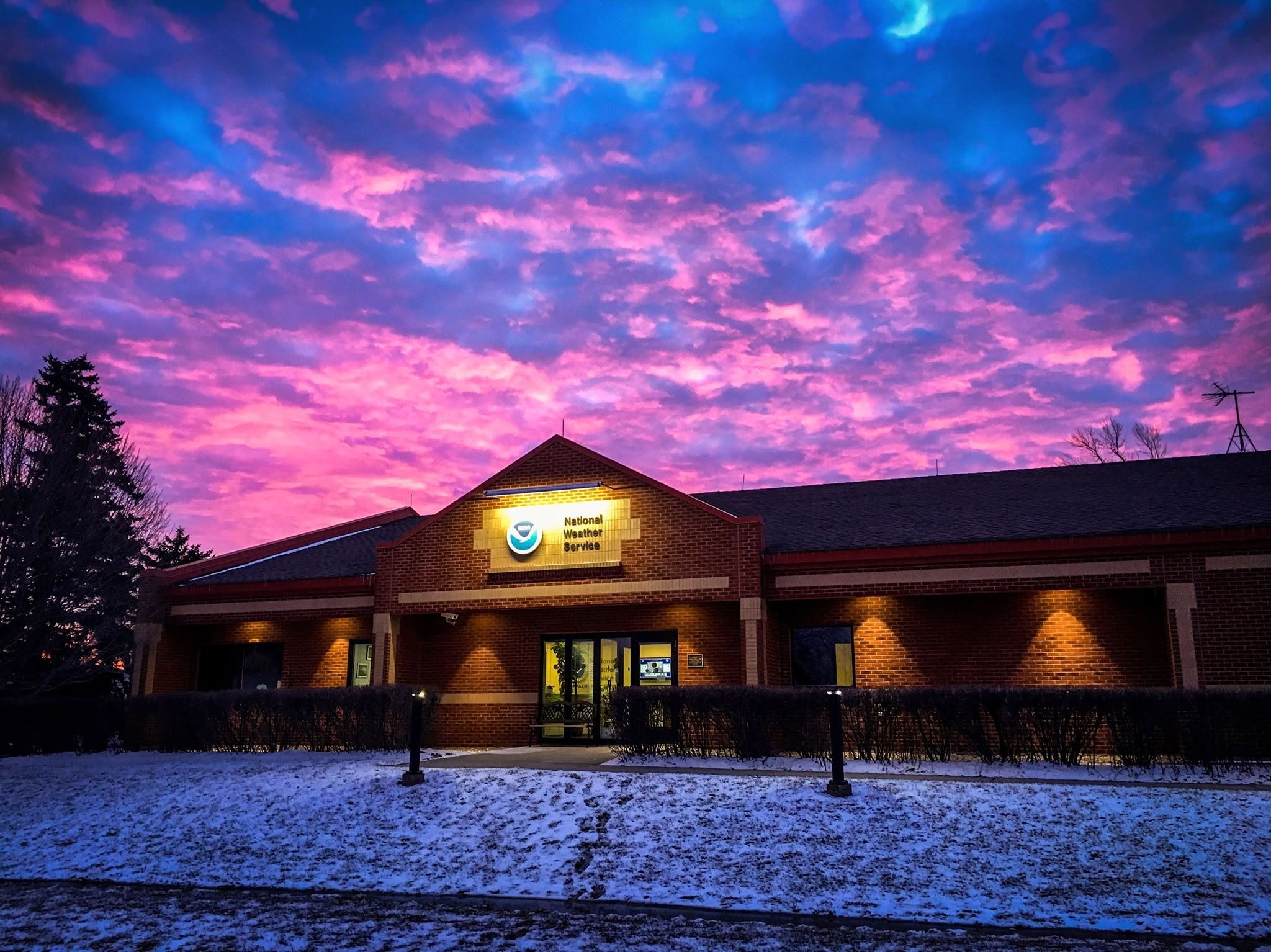

Agency overview
- Formed: November 1870; 155 years ago
- Type: Meteorological
- Jurisdiction: National Weather Service
- Headquarters: 587 Aero Drive; Cheektowaga, NY 14225; 42.94140091854919°N 78.71929989811092°W
- Employees: 25
- Agency executives: Michael Fries, Meteorologist in Charge; Bernadette Walsh, Administrative Support Assistant
- Parent agency: National Weather Service
- Website: www.weather.gov/buf/

The National Weather Service Buffalo, New York (office identification code: BUF) is a local office of the National Weather Service responsible for monitoring weather conditions in Western New York and other portions of upstate, downwind from Lake Erie and Lake Ontario. It is based on the premises of Buffalo Niagara International Airport in Cheektowaga. The territory covers the cities of Buffalo, Rochester, Geneva, Fulton, and Watertown. Much of the office's work focuses on lake-effect snow.

== History ==
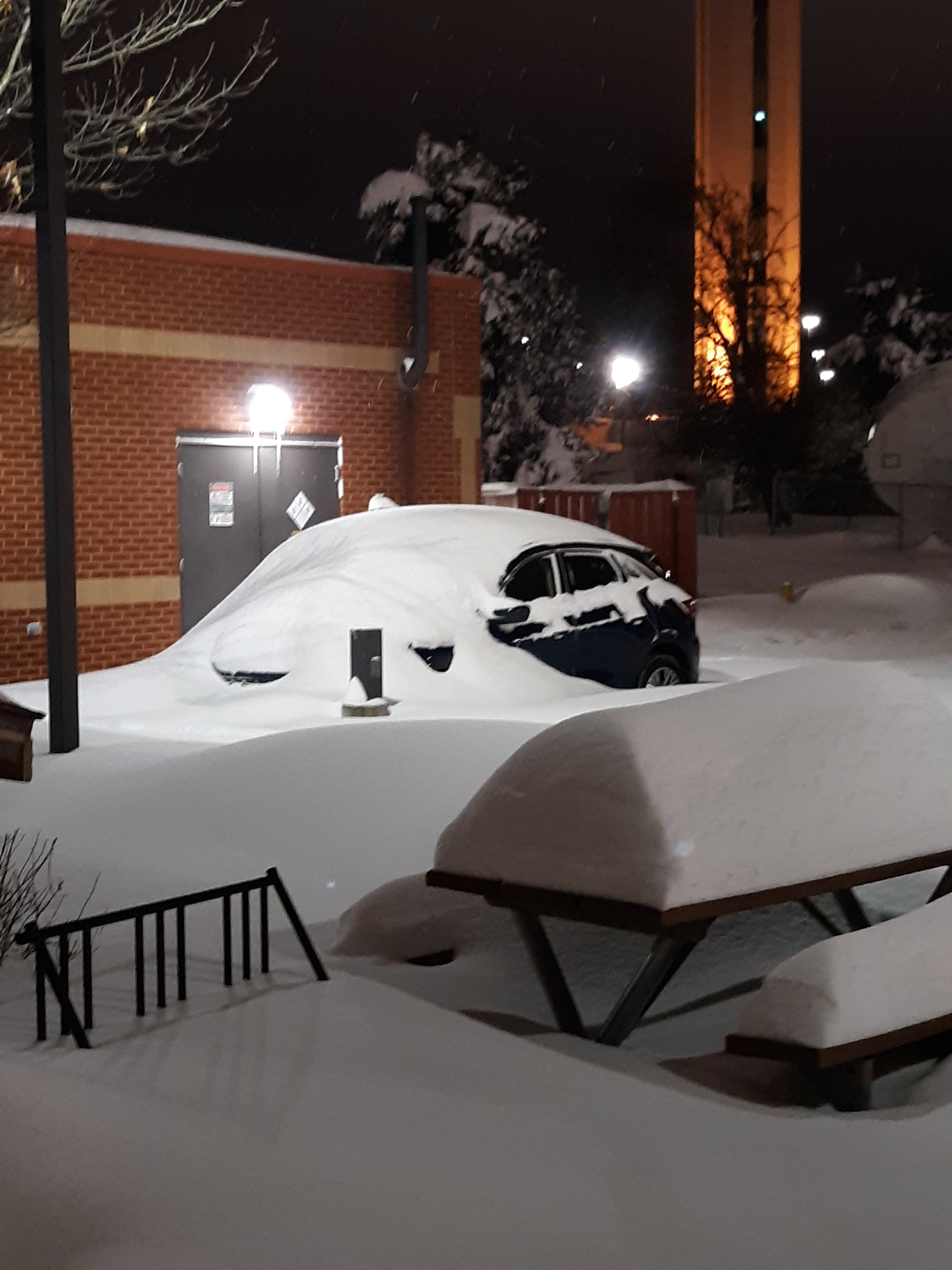
The National Weather Service Forecast Office in Buffalo during the November 2022 winter storm.

On February 9, 1870, President Ulysses Grant signed into law a Joint Congressional Resolution that required the Secretary of War to establish a weather forecasting service for the United States. Tasked with taking and disseminating weather observations from selected sites, this agency was assigned to the Signal Service of the United States Army due to the fact that military discipline was needed and the new service needed to have a reliable communications system. Weather observations were initially to be made at 24 sites, with observations to be taken three times daily at 7:35 a.m., 4:35 and 11:35 p.m. local time. The official observations were then transmitted back to Washington D.C., with other observations to be taken as required.

Operations of the Buffalo forecast office under the Signal Service began in the Hollister block of downtown Buffalo in November 1870. The station remained in the downtown area until 1944, when it moved its operations to the Buffalo Niagara International Airport. An observatory building was completed on the eastern side of the airport in the early 1960's, and a separate forecast wing at the airport terminal opened later in the same decade. In 1981, the observatory portion was converted into a contract meteorological observatory. The observation function was moved to the airport's terminal in the late 1990's, after the observatory's operation was transferred to the FAA. The forecast office moved into its present facilities near the eastern edge of the airport on Aero Drive in April 1995.

== Jurisdictions served ==
=== Counties ===
- Allegany
- Cattaraugus
- Cayuga
- Chautauqua
- Erie
- Genesee
- Jefferson
- Lewis
- Livingston
- Monroe
- Niagara
- Chautauqua
- Orleans
- Oswego
- Seneca
- St. Lawrence
- Wayne
- Wyoming
- Yates

=== Cities ===
- Buffalo
- Rochester
- Geneva
- Fulton
- Watertown
- Niagara Falls

== NOAA Weather Radio ==
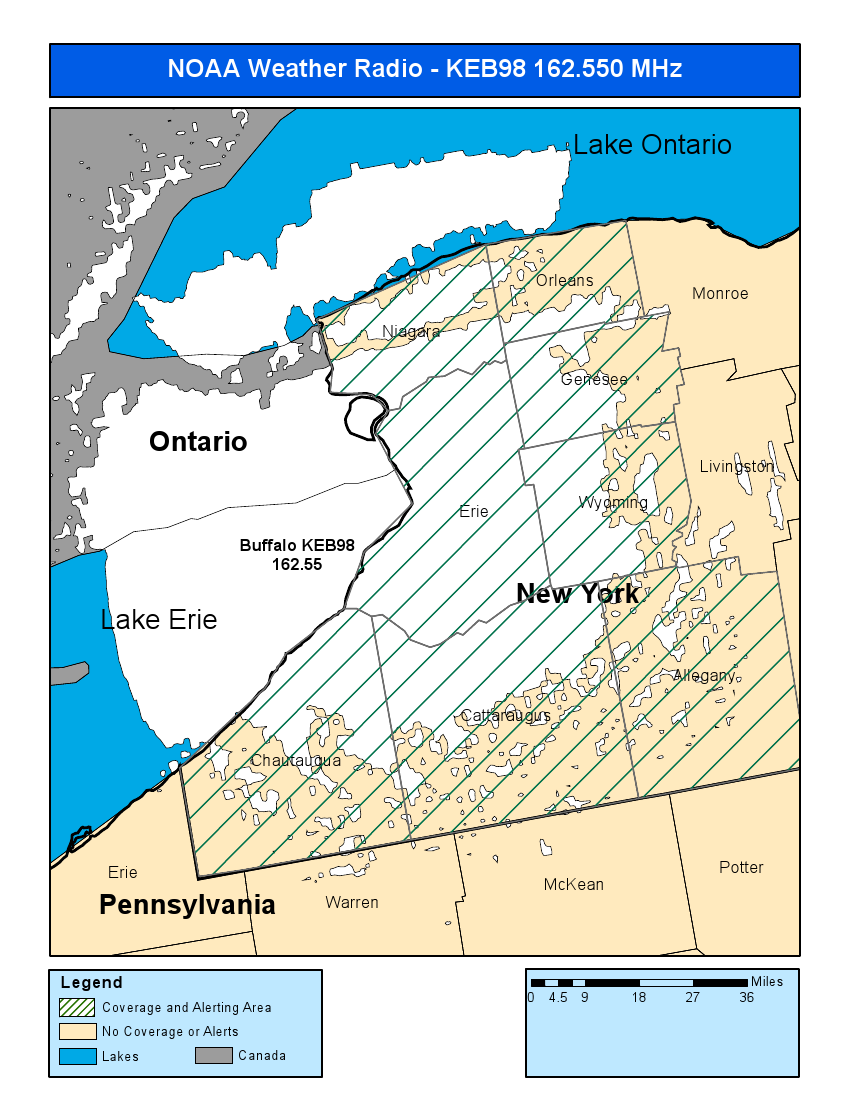
Coverage area map for KEB98, the office's flagship station

The National Weather Service Buffalo, New York forecast office maintains programming for seven NOAA Weather Radio stations in New York to transmit routine extended and specialized short-term forecasts, current weather observations, hazardous weather outlooks and historical weather information. Each of the transmitters, through the Emergency Alert System, also disseminate watches, warnings and advisories issued by the NWS office, severe thunderstorm and tornado watches issued by the Storm Prediction Center, lake-effect and winter weather warnings, and other emergency information to the public.

The office schedules a required weekly test of the Specific Area Message Encoding system for public alert dissemination on all seven NOAA Weather Radio transmitters in the region each Wednesday at about 11:00 a.m. Eastern Time. If there is a threat of severe weather in the listening area of any or all of the stations, the test would be postponed to the next available good weather day, barring that severe weather is not forecasted to occur then.

Station	Frequency (MHz)	City of license	Transmitter power
KEB-98	162.550	Buffalo, New York	600 Watts
WNG-541	162.525	Frewsburg, New York	175 watts
WWG-32	162.425	Little Valley, New York	100 watts
KHA-53	162.400	Rochester, New York	500 watts
WNG-539	162.525	Spencerport, New York	300 watts
WZ-2536	162.475	Lyons, New York	250 watts
WXN-68	162.475	Watertown, New York	100 watts
