= Isaac Seneca =

American football player (1874–1945)

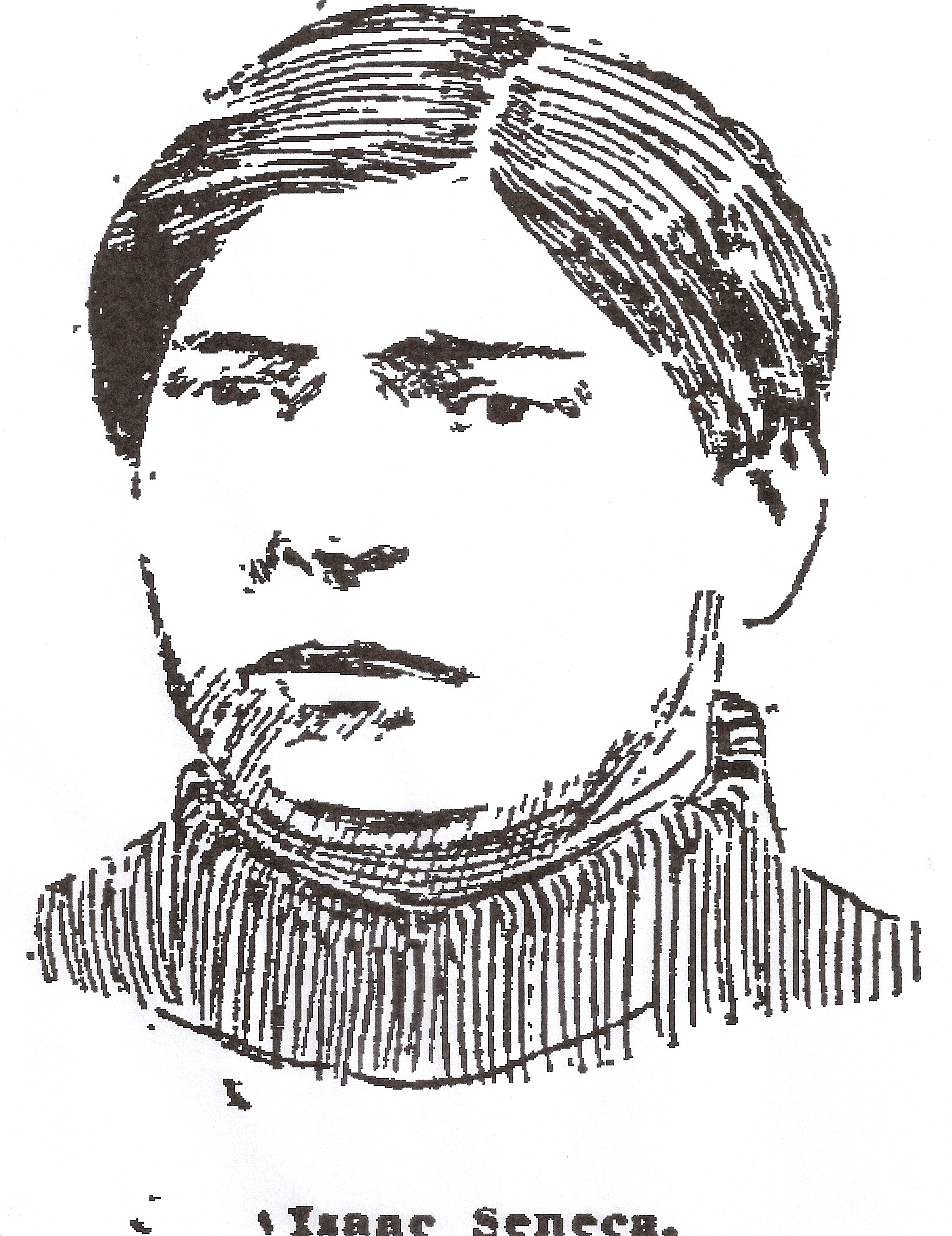
- Isaac Seneca
- Born: October 7, 1874; Cattaraugus Reservation, Cattaraugus County, New York, US
- Died: 1945 (aged 70–71); Cattaraugus Reservation, Erie County, New York, US
- Resting place: United Missions Cemetery, Erie County, New York
- Education: Carlisle Indian Industrial School
- Known for: First Native American to be named a College Football All-American, 1899
- Spouse: Rose Frass (m. 1904)

Isaac Seneca Jr. (October 7, 1874 – 1945) was an All-American football player for the Carlisle Indian Industrial School. He was selected as an All-American halfback on the 1899 College Football All-America Team. He was the first Carlisle player and the first American Indian to be selected as an All-American. He was born in 1874 on the Cattaraugus Reservation in New York.

== All-American for Carlisle ==
Seneca was a member of the Seneca Nation of Indians who grew up on the Cattaraugus Reservation in western New York State. Seneca played football for Carlisle from 1896 to 1899 and 1901. The first Carlisle football team was formed in 1895, and Seneca was the school's first All-American—nearly a decade before Jim Thorpe began playing for the school.

In 1896, Carlisle played games against college football's "Big Four" (Harvard, Yale, Princeton, and Penn) and nearly defeated Yale. The New York Times reported on a run by Seneca that nearly won the game against Yale:

Seneca was given the ball to go through the centre. He got through with one or two Yale men hanging on to him. Then he squirmed and shook off the Yale men, dodged a man or two, and, making a splendid run down the field, made what was thought to be a touchdown. Nearly all on the grounds shouted themselves hoarse. Men waved their hats in the air, pretty gals clapped their hands ...

However, the referee waved off the touchdown, ruling that Seneca was "down" when the Yale players hung on to him. The New York Times wrote the next day that the referee had made the wrong call and that Carlisle had been robbed of a touchdown, but the game went into the record books as a 12–6 win for Yale.

Isaac Seneca's brother, Victor Seneca, also played for Carlisle. On the train returning from a game against the University of Pennsylvania in 1897, Victor was killed when he put his head out the window of the train and was struck by a telegraph pole.

In 1899, Glenn "Pop" Warner was hired as the head football coach and athletic director at Carlisle. In Warner's first season at Carlisle, the Carlisle team faced a difficult schedule, playing games against top opponents and traveling to games in New York (twice), Philadelphia, Phoenix and San Francisco. The 1899 Carlisle team posted an 8–2 record and was ranked fourth in the nation. Carlisle defeated Columbia 42-0 in a game played in Manhattan on Thanksgiving Day 1899 with 10,000 fans in attendance. Seneca was the star of the game, having two runs of 30 yards and another of 40 yards. A press account of the game said: "The Indians were in prime physical condition and bore through the Columbia line and skirted the ends at will. At least eight times the Carlisle backs got around the ends for runs of thirty to sixty yards. Most of these runs were made by Seneca and Miller."

At the end of the 1899 season, Seneca was elected as captain of the 1900 team (though he would opt to play professional football rather than return in 1900). After the regular season, the Carlisle team accepted an invitation to play the University of California, San Francisco on Christmas Day. Carlisle won the game, 2–0. The Carlisle school newspaper wrote the following about Seneca after his return from California in January 1900:

Isaac Seneca, the newly elected Captain, felt it an honor to be chosen as Captain for such a team. He never had an idea that he would see the Pacific Ocean. In that trip he had learned more of the geography of the country than he could have learned from books. When he used to play on the scrub teams for amusement, he never had an idea that he would reach the first team, and now that he was chosen captain he felt the great responsibility and honor of his position. He paid Mr. Thompson tribute as an excellent athletic teacher.

After the 1899 season, Seneca was also honored by being named a first team All-American—the first Carlisle player and the first American Indian to be so honored. He was later named by Athlon Athletics to the All-Time American Indian College Football Team.

In a 1960 feature article about the Carlisle Indians, Sports Illustrated noted that the accomplishments of Seneca and Thorpe created an "ageless myth" for the American Indians:

There was an element of grandeur, something almost mythological, in the rise of the Carlisle Indians to national and then to world fame ... And the Indians had an incentive to save their people as poignant as any in history. Isaac Seneca, for instance, came from a New York tribe that was down to 2,700 survivors. There were only about 600 left in the Oklahoma tribe to which Jim Thorpe belonged. Their tribes were perishing, and the epic striving of the Carlisle Indians was a last great effort to reach the unattainable ...

== Professional football ==
After leaving Carlisle, Seneca briefly played professional football for the Greensburg Athletic Association in Greensburg, Pennsylvania. In an October 1900 game against Altoona, Seneca made several substantial gains, including a 25-yard run and a 50-yard touchdown run. During a game against Latrobe in 1900, a fight broke out between Seneca and Latrobe's quarterback, Al Kennedy. The crowd of 2,000 spectators joined in what one historic account has called "a general donnybrook."

== Later years ==
Information on Seneca's later years is lacking, though a 1917 publication noted that a Carlisle graduate named Isaac Seneca was the head of the blacksmithing department at the Chilocco Indian Agricultural School near Ponca City, Oklahoma. A 1928 article notes that Seneca is now "in the government service". At the time of the 1930 United States Census, Seneca was listed as a blacksmith working in Ponca City, Oklahoma. Seneca moved back to New York sometime between 1937 and 1940; at the time of the 1940 United States census, he was living at the Cattaraugus Reservation, Erie County, New York, listed as widowed, working as a blacksmith.
