= Burr Sprague =

American politician

Burr Sprague (April 30, 1836 – April 17, 1917) was an American lawyer and politician.

Born in Perrysburg, New York, Sprague moved to Wisconsin in 1848 and lived in the town of Spring Valley, Rock County, Wisconsin and then Brodhead, Wisconsin. He was a lawyer and was the editor and publisher of the Brodhead Independent Observer. Sprague also served as postmaster of Orfordville and Brodhead, Wisconsin. He also served as judge of the Green County court and Brodhead superintendent of public schools. In 1868, 1880, and 1881, Sprague served in the Wisconsin State Assembly and was a Republican. Sprague died at his home in Brodhead, Wisconsin.
