= Versailles, New York =

Versailles, New York Seneca: Gasdë:gö:h
- Hamlet
- Location within New York Location within the United States
- Coordinates: 42°31′08″N 78°59′45″W
- Country: United States
- State: New York
- County: Cattaraugus
- Town: Perrysburg
- Elevation: 764 ft (233 m)
- Time zone: UTC-5 (Eastern (EST))
  - Summer (DST): UTC-4 (EDT)
- ZIP code: 14168
- Area code: 716
- GNIS feature ID: 968512

Versailles (Seneca: Gasdë:gö:h) is a hamlet in Cattaraugus County, New York, United States. The community is located along Cattaraugus Creek, 4.9 miles (7.9 km) northwest of Gowanda. Versailles has a post office with ZIP code 14168, which opened on September 13, 1837.

Versailles is located on the border of the Cattaraugus Indian Reservation. County Route 42 is the primary highway through Versailles. As with a number of locations in Western New York, it is typically pronounced with a nonstandard pronunciation, such that it rhymes with the word "sales."
