= Porter Cornelius Bliss =

American diplomat

- Born: December 28, 1838; Cattaraugus Reservation, Erie County, New York, U.S.
- Died: February 1, 1885 (aged 46); New York, U.S.
- Burial place: Randolph Cemetery, Cattaraugus County, New York
- Occupations: Author; Journalist; Historian; Linguist
- Parent: Rev. Asher Bliss

Porter Cornelius Bliss (December 28, 1838 – February 1, 1885), was an American journalist, linguist, historian and diplomat. Bliss was a volunteer in defense of the capital, served in various government positions and traveled extensively; he was once accused of treason and conspiracy, and imprisoned before being rescued by a United States Navy Squadron.

He served as an editor of the Washington Chronicle from 1869 to 1870 and as an editor and biographer at the New York Herald from 1878 through 1881. Bliss also spent three years working on Johnson's Cyclopedia and edited a weekly called The Literary Table.

== Biography ==
Bliss was born to Reverend Asher and Cassandra (Hooper) Bliss, on the Cattaraugus Reservation, Erie County, New York of Seneca Indians on December 28, 1838. His father was a minister to the Seneca Indians.

He studied at Hamilton College and Yale College, then traveled in Maine, New Brunswick, and Nova Scotia (1860–61), investigating the condition of the Indian tribes in behalf of societies at Boston. Bliss was employed for some months as clerk in the Indian Bureau, and subsequently in the post-office department at Washington in 1861. He was elected a member of the American Antiquarian Society in 1861.

Bliss took part in volunteer organizations for the defense of the capital, visited England the same year, and accompanied General James Watson Webb as private secretary on his mission to Brazil (1861–63). He was commissioner of the Government of the Argentine Republic for the exploration of the Indian country called the Gran Chaco 1863 and edited at Buenos Aires a monthly periodical, The River Platte Magazine in 1864.

Bliss was appointed by President Francisco Solano López, as historiographer of Paraguay and became secretary to Hon. Charles Ames Washburn, U.S. minister to Paraguay in 1866; he aided him in collecting materials for his History of Paraguay (2 vols., 1871). He was imprisoned by the command of López on a charge of treason and conspiracy for his assassination September 10, 1868 and while imprisoned wrote, under duress, a deliberately falsified account of the U.S. legation's plan, retracted after his rescue by a U.S. Navy squadron December 10, 1868. Bliss was later appointed as translator to the State Department at Washington, March, 1869 and served as editor of the Washington Chronicle (1869–70).

President Grant appointed him secretary of legation in Mexico (1870–74), and acting minister for several months, (1872–73). He afterward resided in New York, and was vice-president of the American Philological Society and an editor of the New York Herald from 1878 through 1881. he also did editing work for the New Haven News in 1883. Bliss died in New York, February 1, 1885.

== Bibliography ==
A collection of the Porter Cornelius Bliss Papers are available at the Latin American Library at Tulane University. A selection of his works are listed below.

- The Ethnography of the Gran Chaco, Buenos Aires, 1864.
- The conquest of Turkey, co-author with L.P. Brockett, Hubbard Bros., 1878.
- Causes and consequences of the Paraguayan war, place and date of publication unknown.
- Correspondence and other documents concerning the relations of the United States with Paraguay, the Argentine Republic, Uruguay and Brazil during the Paraguayan War (papers), Washington, Government Printing Office, 1868–69.
- Catalogue of the library of the late Porter C. Bliss, Taylor, 1885.
