= Perrysburg, New York =

Perrysburg, New York Seneca: Ganye’sta:’geh
- Town
- Location within New York Location within the United States
- Coordinates: 42°29′3″N 79°0′54″W
- Country: United States
- State: New York
- County: Cattaraugus

Government
  - Type: Town Council
  - Town Supervisor: Dennis C. Stopen (D, R)
  - Town Council: Members' List: • Richard M. Gabel (D, R); • Lynn W. Varney (D, R); • Mary L. Denea (R); • Tamara A. Utley (R)

Area
  - Total: 28.55 sq mi (73.94 km^{2})
  - Land: 28.42 sq mi (73.61 km^{2})
  - Water: 0.13 sq mi (0.33 km^{2})
- Elevation: 1,080 ft (330 m)

Population (2020)
  - Total: 1,515
  - Estimate (2021): 1,502
  - Density: 55.7/sq mi (21.52/km^{2})
- Time zone: Eastern (EST)
- ZIP Codes: 14129 (Perrysburg); 14168 (Versailles); 14070 (Gowanda); 14081 (Irving); 14138 (South Dayton)
- FIPS code: 36-009-57298
- Website: www.perrysburgny.gov

Perrysburg (Seneca: Ganye’sta:’geh) is a town in Cattaraugus County, New York, United States. The population was 1,515 at the 2020 census. The town is named after Commodore Oliver Hazard Perry and is located in the northwest corner of the county. The town contains the census-designated place also named Perrysburg, formerly an incorporated village.

== History ==
The town of Perrysburg was formed in 1814 as the "town of Perry" from the towns of Hebe and Olean. It originally consisted of the entire western half of the county and was created because the county did not yet have a centralized government; Hebe and Olean were administered as part of Allegany County. Perry was governed as part of Niagara County (which at the time also covered the entirety of what is now Erie County) until Cattaraugus County achieved self-government in 1817.

In 1818, the same year Little Valley and Great Valley were split off to govern the southwest part of the county, the town changed its name to "Perrysburgh". Eventually, likely at the behest of the United States Board on Geographic Names during the Benjamin Harrison administration in the 1890s, the spelling became "Perrysburg." Over the course of the 19th century, the town was divided to form what are now all of the towns in northwestern Cattaraugus County: Dayton, Persia, Otto, East Otto, Mansfield, New Albion, and Leon.

== Geography ==
According to the United States Census Bureau, the town has a total area of 28.5 square miles (73.9 km^{2}), of which 28.4 square miles (73.6 km^{2}) is land and 0.12 square miles (0.3 km^{2}), or 0.44%, is water.

The northern border is Cattaraugus Creek with Erie County on the opposite bank. The western border is Chautauqua County.

The town's geographic location results in frequent and heavy lake-effect snow events during the fall and winter. It is often the site for maximum snowfall accumulations. A hill rising to over 1,600 feet (490 m) on the southern edge of the town contributes to orographic enhancement, intensifying snowfall. From December 10 through December 17, 2013, nearly 7 feet (2.1 m) (84 in or 2,100 mm) of snow fell on the town, with the majority of it being lake-effect snow. Some locals have named Perrysburg the snow capital of Western New York.

New York State Route 39 is an east–west highway through the town.

=== Adjacent towns and areas ===
To the west is the town of Hanover in Chautauqua County. The southern border is formed with the town of Dayton. The eastern border is the town of Persia and the village of Gowanda. The northern border is formed with the Cattaraugus Reservation and the town of Brant in Erie County.

=== Climate ===
Climate data for Perrysburg, New York, 1991–2020 normals: 1210ft (369m)
Month	Jan	Feb	Mar	Apr	May	Jun	Jul	Aug	Sep	Oct	Nov	Dec	Year
Mean daily maximum °F (°C)	31.0 (−0.6)	33.6 (0.9)	43.0 (6.1)	55.4 (13.0)	68.0 (20.0)	75.8 (24.3)	78.7 (25.9)	78.2 (25.7)	71.3 (21.8)	58.7 (14.8)	46.9 (8.3)	35.6 (2.0)	56.4 (13.5)
Daily mean °F (°C)	23.4 (−4.8)	24.9 (−3.9)	33.0 (0.6)	43.9 (6.6)	56.6 (13.7)	65.6 (18.7)	68.9 (20.5)	68.1 (20.1)	61.0 (16.1)	49.4 (9.7)	38.7 (3.7)	29.0 (−1.7)	46.9 (8.3)
Mean daily minimum °F (°C)	15.7 (−9.1)	16.2 (−8.8)	23.0 (−5.0)	32.4 (0.2)	45.2 (7.3)	55.4 (13.0)	59.0 (15.0)	58.1 (14.5)	50.7 (10.4)	40.1 (4.5)	30.5 (−0.8)	22.3 (−5.4)	37.4 (3.0)
Average precipitation inches (mm)	4.90 (124)	4.18 (106)	3.81 (97)	3.99 (101)	3.65 (93)	4.18 (106)	3.74 (95)	4.50 (114)	4.95 (126)	5.32 (135)	4.75 (121)	5.76 (146)	53.73 (1,364)
Average snowfall inches (cm)	66.00 (167.6)	46.30 (117.6)	21.90 (55.6)	6.70 (17.0)	0.10 (0.25)	0.00 (0.00)	0.00 (0.00)	0.00 (0.00)	0.00 (0.00)	0.30 (0.76)	15.70 (39.9)	51.30 (130.3)	208.3 (529.01)
Source: NOAA

== Demographics ==
Historical population
Census	Pop.	Note	%±
1820	835		—
1830	2,440		192.2%
1840	1,660		−32.0%
1850	1,861		12.1%
1860	1,439		−22.7%
1870	1,313		−8.8%
1880	1,376		4.8%
1890	1,123		−18.4%
1900	1,067		−5.0%
1910	1,004		−5.9%
1920	1,150		14.5%
1930	1,358		18.1%
1940	1,805		32.9%
1950	1,507		−16.5%
1960	1,857		23.2%
1970	2,236		20.4%
1980	2,180		−2.5%
1990	1,838		−15.7%
2000	1,771		−3.6%
2010	1,626		−8.2%
2020	1,515		−6.8%
2021 (est.)	1,502	▼	−0.9%
U.S. Decennial Census

As of the census of 2000, there were 1,771 people, 685 households, and 487 families residing in the town. The population density was 62.1 inhabitants per square mile (24.0/km^{2}). There were 752 housing units at an average density of 26.4 per square mile (10.2/km^{2}). The racial makeup of the town was 94.52% White, 0.34% Black or African American, 3.39% Native American, 0.06% Asian, 0.34% from other races, and 1.36% from two or more races. Hispanic or Latino of any race were 0.62% of the population.

There were 685 households, out of which 28.9% had children under the age of 18 living with them, 56.1% were married couples living together, 11.4% had a female householder with no husband present, and 28.8% were non-families. 24.4% of all households were made up of individuals, and 11.1% had someone living alone who was 65 years of age or older. The average household size was 2.46 and the average family size was 2.87.

In the town, the population was spread out, with 22.3% under the age of 18, 6.8% from 18 to 24, 28.0% from 25 to 44, 26.6% from 45 to 64, and 16.3% who were 65 years of age or older. The median age was 41 years. For every 100 females, there were 100.1 males. For every 100 females age 18 and over, there were 98.8 males.

The median income for a household in the town was $37,212, and the median income for a family was $44,231. Males had a median income of $34,028 versus $23,828 for females. The per capita income for the town was $17,453. About 7.1% of families and 13.4% of the population were below the poverty line, including 18.7% of those under age 18 and 14.1% of those age 65 or over.

== Communities and locations in the Town of Perrysburg ==
- Balltown – A hamlet near the town's western border with the town of Hanover in Chautauqua County.
- Cattaraugus Creek – A stream that forms Perrysburg's northern border with the towns of Collins and Brant in Erie County.
- Cattaraugus Reservation – A reservation of the Seneca Nation of Indians, which is partially in the town. As a part of the Seneca Nation, the reservation is a semi-autonomous sovereign territory, and generally not within the jurisdiction of the town or the state of New York.
- Perrysburg – The census-designated place and former village of Perrysburg in the south-central part of the town, located on NY Route 39.
- Versailles – This hamlet, a former milling community, using the power of Cattaraugus Creek, is located in the northeast corner of the town. The community is east of the junction of County Roads 42 and 58.
- West Perrysburg – The hamlet is located by the Cattaraugus Reservation on County Road 78 in the western part of the town.

== Notable people ==
- Herbert E. Farnsworth, Medal of Honor recipient
- Warren B. Hooker, former US congressman
- Martha McBride Knight, founding member of the Female Relief Society of Nauvoo of the Church of Jesus Christ of Latter Day Saints
- Vinson Knight, early leader in the Latter Day Saint movement
- Tucker Lowes, post Reconstruction indentured servant, serving as first mate on the Dawn Treader
- Freeman Nickerson, early missionary in the Church of Jesus Christ of Latter Day Saints
- Phil Ochs, folk-protest singer
- Sonny Ochs, radio host
- Burr Sprague, Wisconsin jurist and legislator
