= The New York Herald =

Daily newspaper in New York City from 1835 to 1924

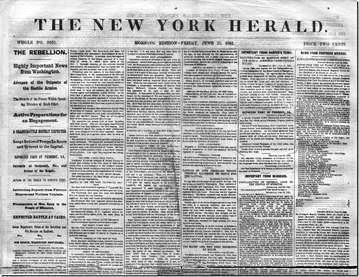
- Cover of The New York Herald on June 20, 1861, covering news of the American Civil War
- Type: Daily newspaper
- Format: Broadsheet
- Publisher: James Gordon Bennett Sr. James Gordon Bennett Jr.
- Founded: 1835; 191 years ago
- Ceased publication: 1924; 102 years ago
- Headquarters: Manhattan, New York City, U.S.
- Circulation: 84,000 (1861); 190,500 (1885); 120,000 (morning edition) and 245,000 (Sunday) (1900); Below 100,000 (1912)

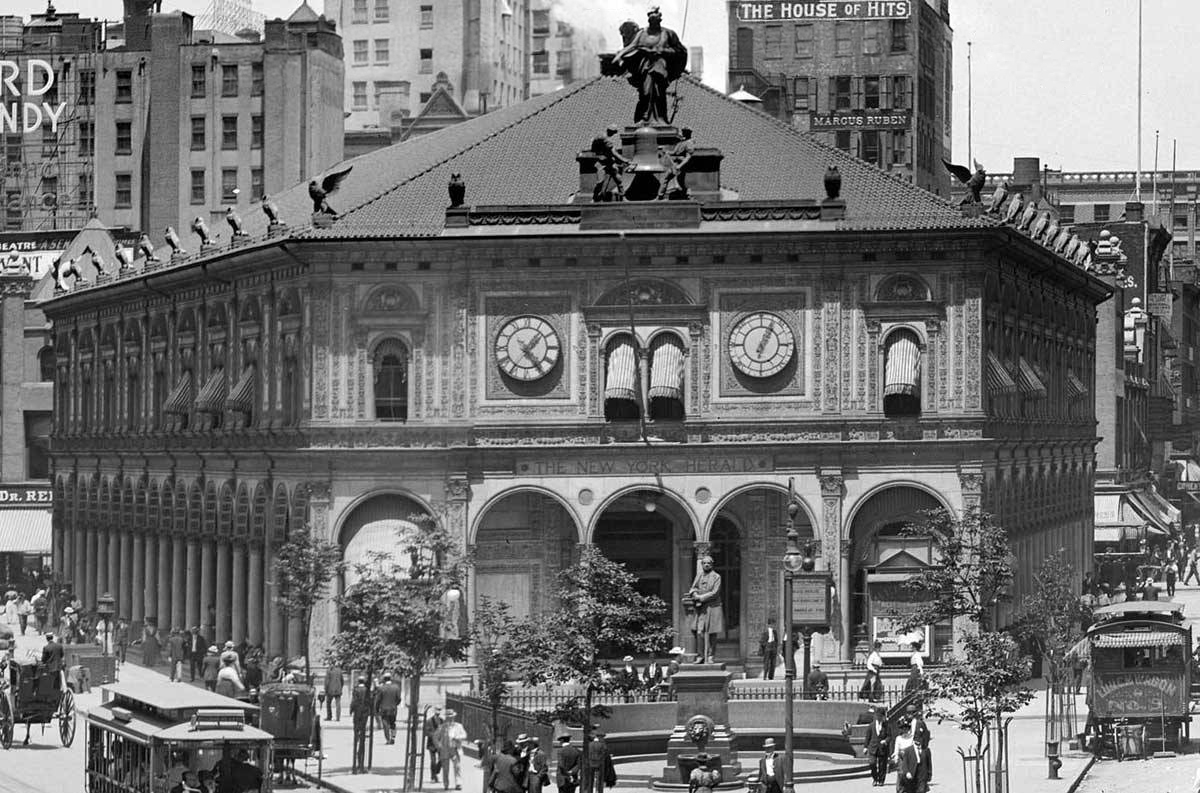
New York Herald Building (1908) by architect Stanford White. It was demolished in 1921.

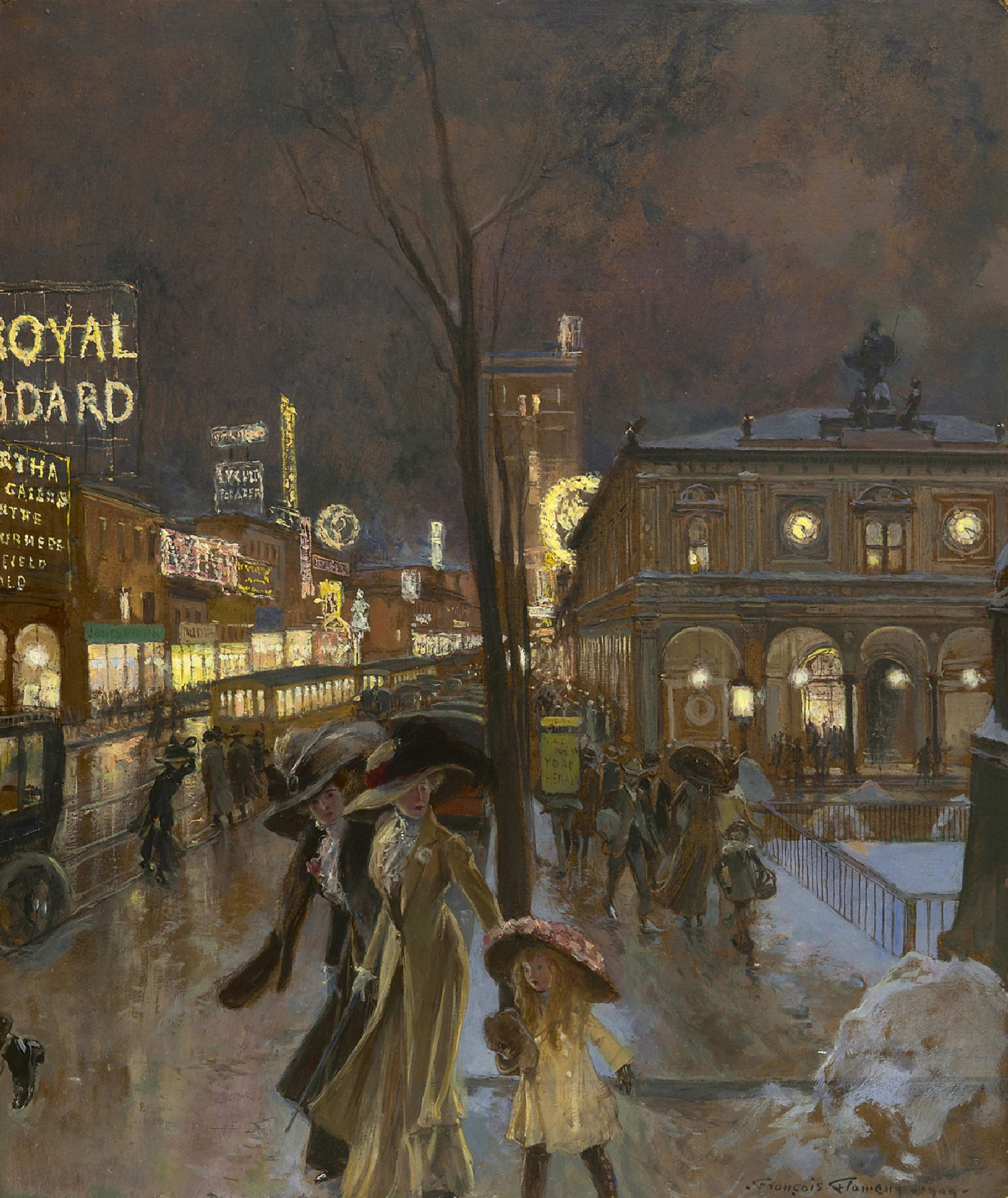
François Flameng (1856–1923), A winter evening in a crowded Herald Square at the New York Herald Building, oil on board 62.4 × 52.4 cm, signed l.r. and dated 1909. Provenance: Simonis & Buunk Fine Art, The Netherlands

The New York Herald was a large-distribution newspaper based in New York City that existed from 1835 to 1924. At that point it was acquired by its smaller rival the New-York Tribune to form the New York Herald Tribune.

== History ==
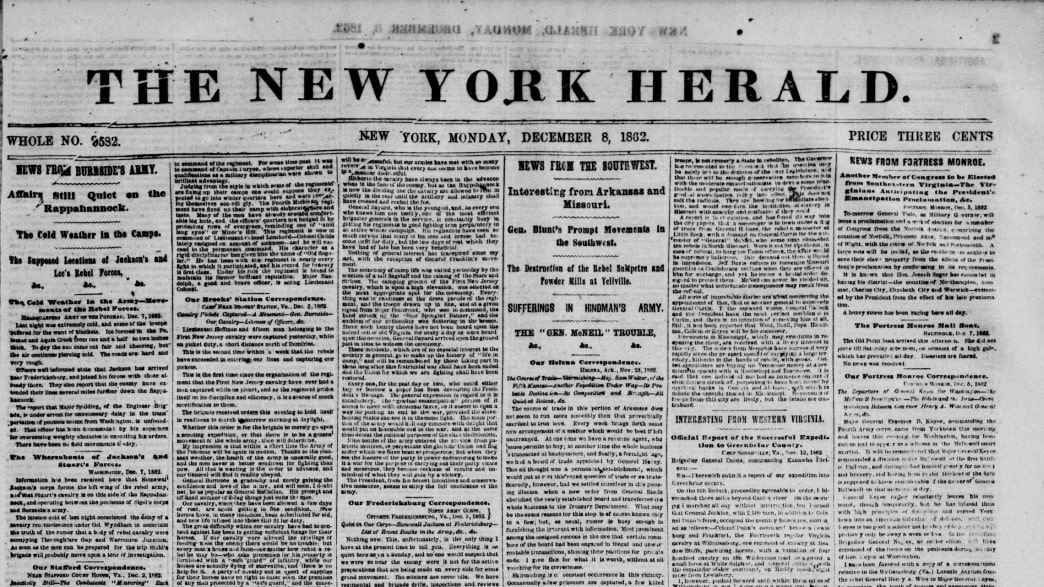
The New York Herald, December 8, 1862

The first issue of the paper was published by James Gordon Bennett Sr., on May 6, 1835. The Herald distinguished itself from the partisan papers of the day by the policy that it published in its first issue: "We shall support no party—be the agent of no faction or coterie, and we care nothing for any election, or any candidate from president down to constable," although it was typically considered sympathetic to the Jacksonian Democratic Party and later, President John Tyler. Bennett pioneered the "extra" edition during the Herald's sensational coverage of the Robinson–Jewett murder case.

By 1845 it was the most popular and profitable daily newspaper in the United States. In 1861 it circulated 84,000 copies and called itself "the most largely circulated journal in the world." Bennett stated that the function of a newspaper "is not to instruct but to startle and amuse." His politics tended to be anti-Catholic and he had tended to favor the "Know Nothing" faction, but he was not so anti-immigrant as the Know-Nothing Native American Party. During the American Civil War, Bennett's policy, as expressed by the newspaper, was to staunchly support the Democratic Party.

During the Civil War, the Herald maintained a staff of 63 war correspondents.

Frederic Hudson served as managing editor of the paper from 1846 to 1866. During the mid-19th century, the New York Herald adopted a proslavery stance, with Bennett arguing that the Compromise of 1850 would lead to "but little anxiety entertained in relation to the question of slavery, the public mind will be so fatigued that it will be disinclined to think of the matter any further."

In April 1867 Bennett turned over control of the paper to his son James Gordon Bennett Jr. Under James Jr., the paper financed Henry Morton Stanley's expeditions into Africa to find explorer David Livingstone, where they met on November 10, 1871. The paper also supported Stanley's trans-Africa exploration. In 1879 it supported the ill-fated expedition of George W. De Long to the Arctic region.

In 1874 the Herald ran the New York Zoo hoax, in which the front page of the newspaper was devoted entirely to a fabricated story of wild animals getting loose at the Central Park Zoo and attacking numerous people. From December 1887 through August 1888, 33 of Walt Whitman's poems appeared in the New York Herald.

On October 4, 1887, Bennett Jr. sent Julius Chambers to Paris, France, to launch its European Edition. Later he moved to Paris himself, but the New York Herald suffered from his attempt to manage its operation in New York by telegram. In 1916 a Saturday issue of the paper reported that a major financier was found dead from poisoning; it added that in 1901 he was "mysteriously poisoned and narrowly escaped death."

After Bennett Jr. died in 1918, Frank Munsey acquired control of the New York Herald (including its European Edition). Munsey merged it in 1920 with the morning edition of The Sun to form The Sun and The New York Herald, but reverted the title to The New York Herald later in the year. In 1924 Munsey sold the paper to the family of Ogden Reid, owners of the New-York Tribune, creating the New York Herald Tribune (and the International Herald Tribune with a divergent future).

When the New York Herald was under the direction of its founder, James Gordon Bennett Sr., it developed a reputation for sensational reporting and aggressive news-gathering methods. Its vivid, attention-grabbing style attracted a mass readership, and by the mid-19th century it had become the most widely circulated daily newspaper in the United States.

== European edition ==
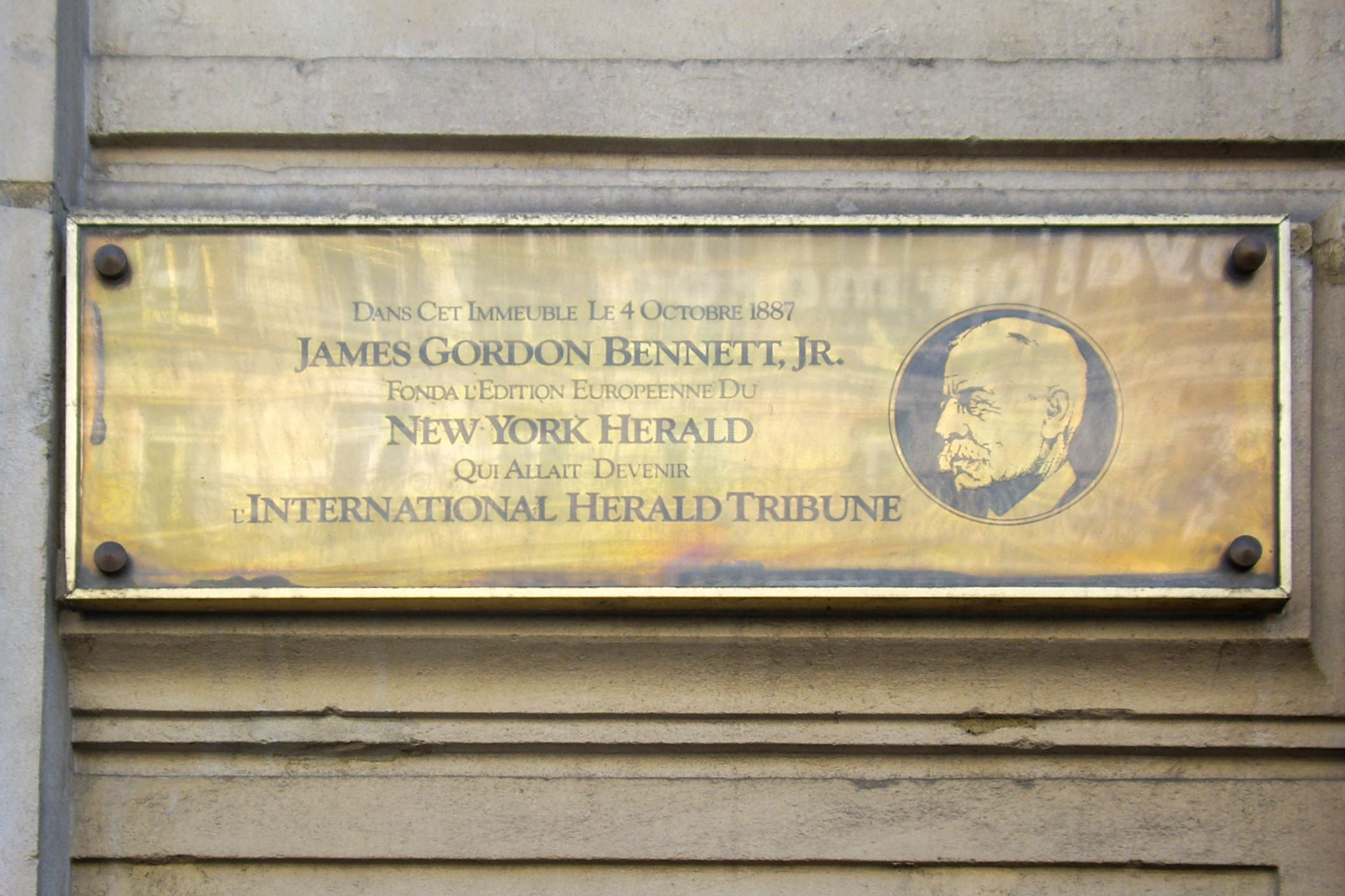
A plaque on a building on Avenue de l'Opéra in Paris commemorates where Bennett Jr. founded the European Edition of The New York Herald and notes that it eventually became the International Herald Tribune.

During the time of original publisher Bennett, The New York Herald was perhaps the best-known American paper in Europe. Its first issue came out on October 4, 1887. The official name of the paper on its front page masthead was The New York Herald European Edition—Paris; it became widely known as simply the Paris Herald.

Publisher Bennett Jr. referred to the paper as a "village publication" for the circle of people in Paris who were interested in international news. Indeed, during its first decades of publication, a feature of the paper was a list of every American known to be in Paris at the time, culled from inspections of hotel registries. Even as the paper's audience grew, most of its readers were in France or countries near France.

The European edition consistently lost money into the 1910s. As the time of Paris in World War I began, Bennett Jr. kept the paper running, even during the First Battle of the Marne when some French papers shut down. When the American Expeditionary Forces began arriving in France in 1917, demand for the Paris Herald soared, with eventually some 350,000 copies being printed each day and the edition finally becoming profitable.

The European edition subsequently became a mainstay of American expatriate culture in Europe. In Ernest Hemingway's novel, The Sun Also Rises (1926), the first thing the novel's protagonist Jake Barnes does on returning from Spain to France is buy The New York Herald from a kiosk in Bayonne in the Basses-Pyrénées department and read it at a café.

== Evening Telegram ==
The New York Evening Telegram was founded in 1867 by the junior Bennett, and was considered by many to be an evening edition of the Herald. Frank Munsey acquired the Telegram in 1920 and ended its connection to the Herald.

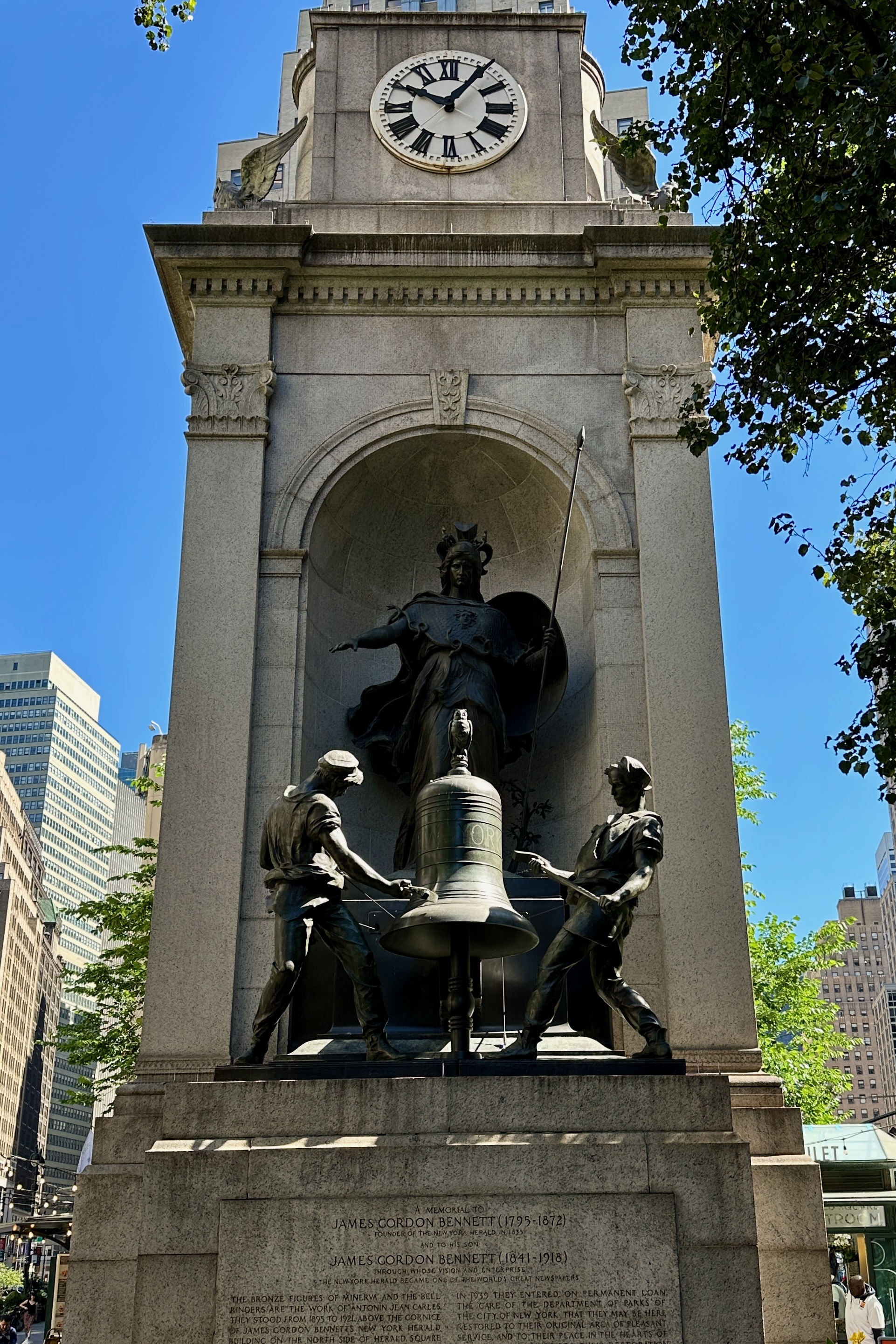
James Gordon Bennett Memorial featuring Minerva and the Bellringers by Antonin Carlès in Herald Square

== Commemorated ==
- New York's Herald Square is named after the New York Herald newspaper.
- The New York Herald Building was designed by the prestigious firm of Stanford White, and completed in 1908. It occupied the north side of the square. At its top was the sculpture, Minerva and the Bellringers, by Antonin Carlès, which sounded every hour with bellringing. After the building was demolished in 1921 to make way for other development, the James Gordon Bennett Memorial featuring the sculpture was installed on the north side of Herald Square in 1940 to commemorate the Bennetts.
- The chorus of "Give My Regards to Broadway" includes the phrase "remember me to Herald Square." North of Herald Square is Times Square, which is named after the rival The New York Times.

== See also ==
- Porter Cornelius Bliss
- New York Herald Tribune (successor to the New York Herald)
