= Kendall Creek (Tunungwant Creek tributary) =

Stream in Pennsylvania, USA

Kendall Creek Tributary to Tunungwant Creek
- Location of Kendall Creek mouth Kendall Creek (Tunungwant Creek tributary) (the United States)

Location
- Country: United States
- State: Pennsylvania
- County: McKean

Physical characteristics
- Source: unnamed tributary to South Branch Cole Creek divide
  - location: about 0.5 miles southwest of Rew, Pennsylvania
  - coordinates: 41°53′49.23″N 078°32′51.68″W
  - elevation: 2,180 ft (660 m)
- Mouth: Tunungwant Creek
  - location: northside of Bradford, Pennsylvania
  - coordinates: 41°58′6.23″N 078°37′31.10″W
  - elevation: 1,414 ft (431 m)
- Length: 5.98 mi (9.62 km)
- Basin size: 15.55 square miles (40.3 km^{2})
- Discharge
  - location: Tunungwant Creek
  - average: 30.27 cu ft/s (0.857 m^{3}/s) at mouth with Tunungwant Creek

Basin features
- Progression: Tunungwant Creek → Allegheny River → Ohio River → Mississippi River → Gulf of Mexico
- River system: Allegheny River
- Tributaries
  - left: unnamed tributaries
  - right: Lafferty Run
- Bridges: PA 46 (x3), Pratt Hollow, Garlock Hollow, Looker Mountain Trail, Totten Hollow, Lafferty Lane, E Main Street

Kendall Creek is a 5.98 mi (9.62 km) long third-order tributary to Tunungwant Creek.

== Course ==
Kendall Creek rises about 0.5 miles (0.80 km) southwest of Rew, Pennsylvania and then flows northwest to meet Tunungwant Creek at Bradford, Pennsylvania.

== Watershed ==
Kendall Creek drains 15.55 square miles (40.3 km^{2}) of area, receives about 45.2 in/year (115 cm/year) of precipitation, and is about 84.62% forested.

== See also ==
- List of rivers of Pennsylvania
