= Hartzfelt Mountain =

Mountain in New York, United States

- Location within New York Adirondack Park Location within the United States

Highest point
- Elevation: 2,405 feet (733 m)
- Coordinates: 42°01′22″N 78°27′25″W

Geography
- Location: SSW of Olean, Cattaraugus County, New York, USA
- Topo map: USGS Olean

Hartzfelt Mountain is a 2,405-foot-tall (733 m) mountain in the Southern Tier of New York. It is located south-southwest of Olean in Cattaraugus County. In 1924, a 60-foot-tall (18 m) steel fire lookout tower was built on the mountain. Due to increased use of aerial detection, the tower ended fire lookout operations at the end of the 1970 fire lookout season, and was later dismantled and removed.

== History ==
Beginning in 1923, there were plans to establish a fire lookout station on the mountain. In 1924, the Conservation Commission built a 60-foot-tall (18 m) Aermotor LS40 steel fire lookout tower and observers cabin on the mountain. Local landowners and towns in the vicinity provided funds for the tower and cabin. In 1967, the Conservation Department purchased the land around the tower to establish a repeater station to extend two-way radio communications for law enforcement. Due to increased use of aerial detection, the tower ceased fire lookout operations at the end of the 1970 fire lookout season. The tower was later dismantled and removed in 1973.
