= Limestone Brook (Tunungwant Creek tributary) =

Stream in New York, USA

Limestone Brook Tributary to Tunungwant Creek
- Location of Limestone Brook mouth Limestone Brook (Tunungwant Creek tributary) (the United States)

Location
- Country: United States
- State: New York
- County: Cattaraugus

Physical characteristics
- Source: divide of Bennett Brook
  - location: about 6 miles west-southwest of Limestone, New York
  - coordinates: 42°00′15.00″N 078°42′56.00″W
  - elevation: 2,210 ft (670 m)
- Mouth: Tunungwant Creek
  - location: Limestone, New York
  - coordinates: 42°01′46.23″N 078°38′23.10″W
  - elevation: 1,388 ft (423 m)
- Length: 4.78 mi (7.69 km)
- Basin size: 7.14 square miles (18.5 km^{2})
- Discharge
  - location: Tunungwant Creek
  - average: 14.48 cu ft/s (0.410 m^{3}/s) at mouth with Tunungwant Creek

Basin features
- Progression: Tunungwant Creek → Allegheny River → Ohio River → Mississippi River → Gulf of Mexico
- River system: Allegheny River
- Tributaries
  - left: unnamed tributaries
  - right: unnamed tributaries
- Bridges: Camp Road, Limestone Run Road, Parkside Drive

Limestone Brook is a 4.78 mi (7.69 km) long first-order tributary to Tunungwant Creek.

== Course ==
Limestone Brook rises about 6 miles (9.7 km) west-southwest of Limestone, New York in Cattaraugus County and then flows northeast and east to meet Tunungwant Creek on the west side of Limestone, New York.

== Watershed ==
Limestone Brook drains 7.14 square miles (18.5 km^{2}) of area, receives about 45.5 in/year (116 cm/year) of precipitation, and is about 95.63% forested.

== See also ==
- List of rivers of New York
