= Foster Brook (Tunungwant Creek tributary) =

Stream in Pennsylvania, USA

Foster Brook Tributary to Tunungwant Creek
- Location of Foster Brook mouth Foster Brook (Tunungwant Creek tributary) (the United States)

Location
- Country: United States
- State: Pennsylvania
- County: McKean

Physical characteristics
- Source: Baker Run divide
  - location: about 1.5 miles southeast of Gilmore, Pennsylvania
  - coordinates: 41°57′34.23″N 078°32′11.08″W
  - elevation: 1,950 ft (590 m)
- Mouth: Tunungwant Creek
  - location: Foster Brook, Pennsylvania
  - coordinates: 41°59′1.23″N 078°37′31.10″W
  - elevation: 1,404 ft (428 m)
- Length: 4.88 mi (7.85 km)
- Basin size: 12.26 square miles (31.8 km^{2})
- Discharge
  - location: Tunungwant Creek
  - average: 2.37 cu ft/s (0.067 m^{3}/s) at mouth with Tunungwant Creek

Basin features
- Progression: Tunungwant Creek → Allegheny River → Ohio River → Mississippi River → Gulf of Mexico
- River system: Allegheny River
- Tributaries
  - left: unnamed tributaries
  - right: Pennbrook Run; Harrisburg Run
- Bridges: Derrick Road, PA 646, PA 346 (x2), Babcock Road, Fairview Heights, E Main Street, Bradford Mall, US 219

Foster Brook is a 4.88 mi (7.85 km) long third-order tributary to Tunungwant Creek.

== Course ==
Foster Brook rises about 1.5 miles (2.4 km) southeast of Gilmore and then flows northwest to meet Tunungwant Creek at Foster Brook, Pennsylvania.

== Watershed ==
Foster Brook drains 12.26 square miles (31.8 km^{2}) of area, receives about 44.9 in/year (114 cm/year) of precipitation, and is about 87.64% forested.

== See also ==
- List of rivers of Pennsylvania
