= Cattaraugus Reservation, Cattaraugus County, New York =

Indian reservation in New York, United States

Coordinates: 42°32′17″N 79°01′10″W

Cattaraugus Reservation (Seneca: Ga’dä꞉gë́sgë꞉öʼ) is an Indian reservation located partly in Cattaraugus County, New York, United States. The population was 314 at the 2010 census. The majority of the residents are of the federally recognized Seneca Nation, one of the original Five Nations of the Haudenosaunee Confederacy.

The majority of the Cattaraugus Reservation is in Erie County and smaller portions are located in Cattaraugus County and Chautauqua County. The main population center in this portion of the reservation is Versailles (Gasdë:gö:h), which straddles the southern border of the reservation.

== Geography ==
According to the United States Census Bureau, the Indian reservation has a total area of 6.0 mi^{2} (15.5 km^{2}). 5.8 mi^{2} (14.9 km^{2}) of it is land and 0.2 mi^{2} (0.6 km^{2}) of it (3.68%) is water.

Cattaraugus Creek runs through the middle of the reservation, and Lake Erie forms part of the western boundary.

== Demographics ==
Historical population
Census	Pop.	Note	%±
1910	1,194		—
1920	1,106		−7.4%
1930	1,218		10.1%
1940	1,411		15.8%
1950	1,421		0.7%
1960	1,426		0.4%
1970	1,384		−2.9%
1980	1,994		44.1%
1990	2,178		9.2%
2000	2,412		10.7%
2010	2,185		−9.4%
2020	2,676		22.5%
U.S. Decennial Census

As of the census of 2000, there were 388 people, 127 households, and 94 families residing in the Indian reservation. The population density was 67.4/mi^{2} (26.0/km^{2}). There were 136 housing units at an average density of 23.6/mi^{2} (9.1/km^{2}). The racial makeup of the Indian reservation was 4.38% White and 95.62% Native American. Hispanic or Latino of any race were 4.12% of the population.

There were 127 households, out of which 49.6% had children under the age of 18 living with them, 32.3% were married couples living together, 35.4% had a female householder with no husband present, and 25.2% were non-families. 20.5% of all households were made up of individuals, and 1.6% had someone living alone who was 65 years of age or older. The average household size was 3.06 and the average family size was 3.52.

In the Indian reservation the population was spread out, with 36.1% under the age of 18, 10.8% from 18 to 24, 31.2% from 25 to 44, 19.1% from 45 to 64, and 2.8% who were 65 years of age or older. The median age was 27 years. For every 100 females, there were 91.1 males. For every 100 females age 18 and over, there were 75.9 males.

The median income for a household in the Indian reservation was $27,292, and the median income for a family was $26,458. Males had a median income of $21,750 versus $23,750 for females. The per capita income for the Indian reservation was $12,443. About 25.3% of families and 24.5% of the population were below the poverty line, including 34.4% of those under age 18 and none of those age 65 or over.

== Notable residents ==
- Isaac Seneca, early professional football player
