= Cattaraugus Reservation, Chautauqua County, New York =

Indian reservation in New York, United States

Coordinates: 42°32′53″N 78°59′51″W

The Cattaraugus Reservation (Seneca: Gaʼdä꞉gë́sgë꞉öʼ) is an Indian reservation of the Seneca Nation of Indians, located partly in Chautauqua County, New York, United States. The population of this portion of the reservation was 38 at the 2010 census. Most of the inhabitants are Seneca people.

This part of the reservation is small. The remainder of the Cattaraugus Reservation is in Erie and Cattaraugus counties.

== Geography ==
According to the United States Census Bureau, the Indian reservation has a total area of 2.8 mi^{2} (7.1 km^{2}). 2.6 mi^{2} (6.8 km^{2}) of it is land and 0.1 mi^{2} (0.4 km^{2}) of it (5.09%) is water.

Cattaraugus Creek runs through the middle, and Lake Erie forms part of the western boundary.

== Demographics ==
Historical population
Census	Pop.	Note	%±
2016 (est.)	37
U.S. Decennial Census

At the 2000 census there were 23 people, 10 households, and 6 families residing in the Indian reservation. The population density was 8.8/mi^{2} (3.4/km^{2}). There were 12 housing units at an average density of 4.6/mi^{2} (1.8/km^{2}). The racial makeup of the Indian reservation was 26.09% White and 73.91% Native American. Of the 10 households 40.0% had children under the age of 18 living with them, 40.0% were married couples living together, and 40.0% were non-families. 30.0% of households were one person and none had someone living alone who was 65 or older. The average household size was 2.30 and the average family size was 2.83.

The age distribution was 30.4% under the age of 18, 13.0% from 18 to 24, 26.1% from 25 to 44, 13.0% from 45 to 64, and 17.4% 65 or older. The median age was 36 years. For every 100 females, there were 130.0 males. For every 100 females age 18 and over, there were 100.0 males.

The median household income was $19,286 and the median family income was $17,813. Males had a median income of $0 versus $0 for females. The per capita income for the Indian reservation was $11,421. There are 42.9% of families living below the poverty line and 31.6% of the population, including 100.0% of under eighteens and none of those over 64.
