= Cattaraugus Reservation, Erie County, New York =

Indian reservation in New York, US

Cattaraugus Reservation Ga’dä꞉gë́sgë꞉öʼ or Onödowa’ga:ʼ Gáhdarö:gwah (Seneca)
- Indian reservation
- Location of Cattaraugus Reservation in New York

- Location of New York in the United States
- Coordinates: 42°32′24″N 78°57′47″W
- Country: United States
- State: New York
- County: Erie County
- Indian country: Seneca Nation of Indians
- Created: 1797

Government
  - Mayor: Maurice A. John Todd Gates Pauline John

Area
  - Total: 25.60 sq mi (66.30 km^{2})
  - Land: 25.26 sq mi (65.43 km^{2})
  - Water: 0.34 sq mi (0.87 km^{2})
- Elevation: 849 ft (259 m)

Population (2010)
  - Total: 1,833
  - Estimate (2016): 1,901
  - Density: 75.2/sq mi (29.05/km^{2})
- Time zone: UTC-5 (EST)
  - Summer (DST): UTC-4 (EDT)
- ZIP code: 14091
- Area code: 716
- Website: sni.org

Cattaraugus Reservation (Seneca: Ga’dä꞉gë́sgë꞉öʼ or Seneca: Onödowa’ga:ʼ Gáhdarö:gwah) is an Indian reservation located partly in Erie County, New York, United States. The population was 1,833 at the 2010 census.

The largest part of the Cattaraugus Reservation is in Erie County; smaller portions are located in Cattaraugus County and Chautauqua County. This is one of the reservations of the Seneca Nation of Indians. The Seneca maintain most of their administrative and public service facilities for the Cattaraugus Reservation in the Erie County portion.

== Geography ==
According to the United States Census Bureau, the Indian reservation has a total area of 25.7 mi^{2} (66.5 km^{2} (25.7 sq mi) (65.6 km^{2}) of it is land and 0.3 mi^{2} (0.78 km^{2}) of it (1.36%) is water.

Cattaraugus Creek runs along the southern portion of the census division, and Lake Erie helps form the western boundary.

New York State Route 438 is the primary route through the reservation. It is a state route in name only; the Seneca Nation maintains the route.

== Demographics ==
Historical population
Census	Pop.	Note	%±
2000	2,001		—
2010	1,833		−8.4%
2020	2,135		16.5%
U.S. Decennial Census

As of the census of 2000, there were 2,001 people, 703 households, and 480 families living in the Indian reservation. The population density was 79.0/mi^{2} (30.5/km^{2}). There were 753 housing units at an average density of 29.7 units per square mile (11.5 units/km^{2}). The racial makeup of the Indian reservation was 86.81% Native American, 11.74% White, 0.05% Pacific Islander, 0.20% from other races, and 1.20% from two or more races. Hispanic or Latino of any race were 0.90% of the population.

There were 703 households, out of which 41.1% had children under the age of 18 living with them, 30.6% were married couples living together, 29.2% had a female householder with no husband present, and 31.6% were non-families. 26.0% of all households were made up of individuals, and 11.0% had someone living alone who was 65 years of age or older. The average household size was 2.85 and the average family size was 3.40.

In the Indian reservation the population was spread out, with 35.3% under the age of 18, 8.6% from 18 to 24, 29.5% from 25 to 44, 17.4% from 45 to 64, and 9.1% who were 65 years of age or older. The median age was 30 years. For every 100 females there were 91.3 males. For every 100 females age 18 and over, there were 83.3 males.

The median income for a household in the Indian reservation was $28,713, and the median income for a family was $27,933. Males had a median income of $25,735 versus $23,438 for females. The per capita income for the Indian reservation was $12,382. About 27.8% of families and 30.6% of the population were below the poverty line, including 41.9% of those under age 18 and 16.2% of those age 65 or over.

== Notable people ==
- Porter Cornelius Bliss, journalist and diplomat
- Deerfoot, runner
- Bemus Pierce, former University at Buffalo head football coach

== See also ==
- Cattaraugus Reservation
