= Tunungwant Creek =

Stream in New York, USA

Tunungwant Creek Tributary to Allegheny River
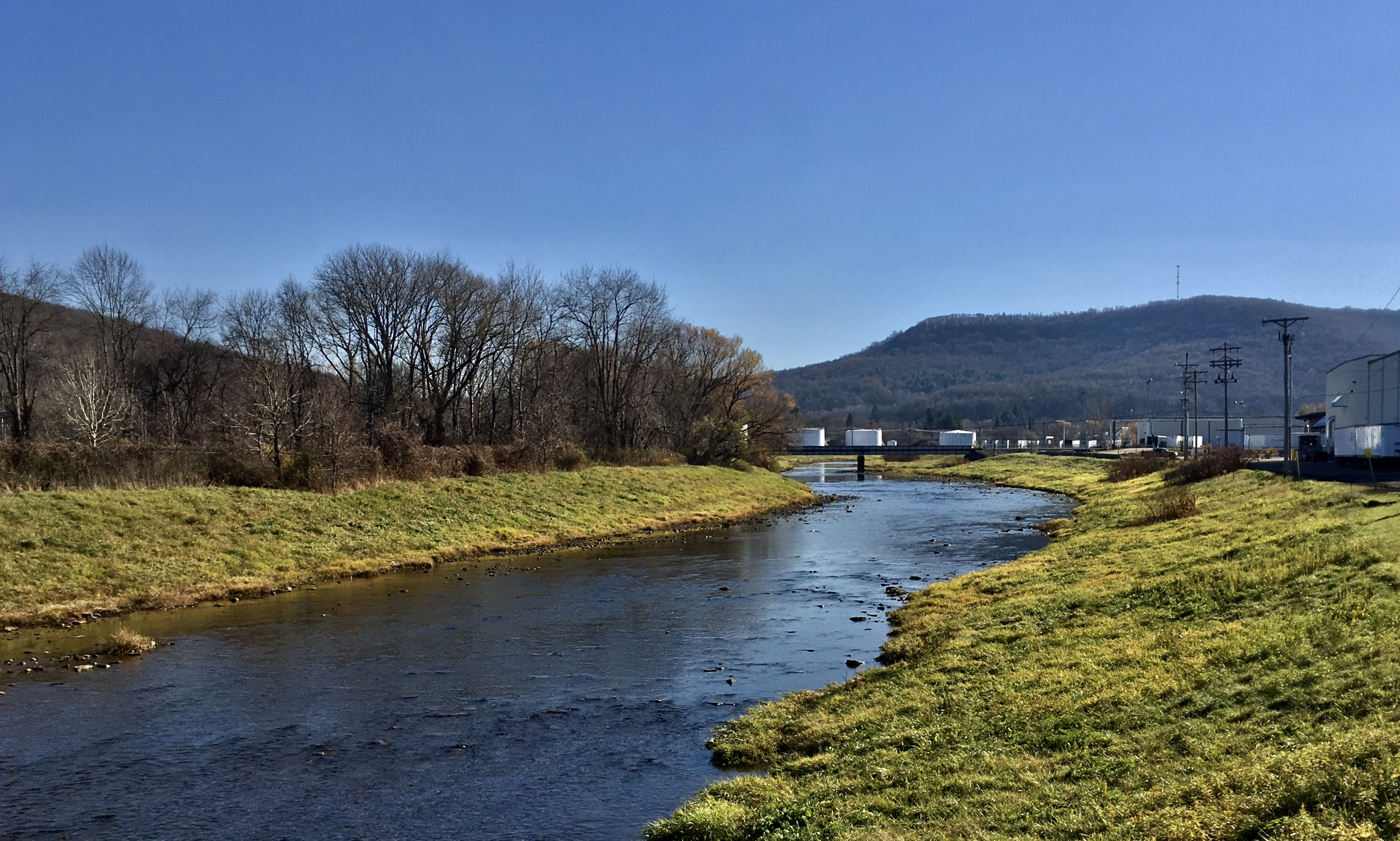
- Tunungwant Creek from PA 346

- Location of Tunungwant Creek mouth Tunungwant Creek (the United States)

Location
- Country: United States
- State: New York; Pennsylvania
- Counties: Cattaraugus; McKean
- City: Bradford (PA)

Physical characteristics
- Source: confluence of East and West Branch Tunungwant Creek
  - location: Bradford, Pennsylvania
  - coordinates: 41°57′29.23″N 078°38′29.10″W
  - elevation: 1,421 ft (433 m)
- Mouth: Allegheny River
  - location: about 5 miles southeast of Salamanca, New York
  - coordinates: 42°05′1.23″N 078°39′0.10″W
  - elevation: 1,335 ft (407 m)
- Length: 12.78 mi (20.57 km)
- Basin size: 169.14 square miles (438.1 km^{2})
- Discharge
  - location: Allegheny River
  - average: 315.95 cu ft/s (8.947 m^{3}/s) at mouth with Allegheny River

Basin features
- Progression: Allegheny River → Ohio River → Mississippi River → Gulf of Mexico
- River system: Allegheny River
- Tributaries
  - left: West Branch Tunungwant Creek; Bolivar Run; Latchaw Creek; Limestone Brook; Rice Brook
  - right: East Branch Tunungwant Creek; Kendall Creek; Foster Brook; Stateline Brook; Nichols Run; Leonard Brook; Bailley Brook
- Bridges: Mill Street, North Kendall Avenue (PA 46), PA 346, US 219, Tuna Cross Road, Bailey Drive, Irvine Mills Drive

Tunungwant Creek is a 12.78 mi (20.57 km) long fifth-order tributary to the Allegheny River. This is the only stream of this name in the United States. According to a 1792 Reading Howell map of Pennsylvania, the stream was known as Ischunuangwandt. Today, it is locally known as 'The Tuna'.

== Course ==
Tunungwant Creek forms at the confluence of East and West Branch Tunungwant Creek in McKean County, Pennsylvania in Bradford and then flows north to meet the Allegheny River about 5 miles (8.0 km) southeast of Salamanca, New York.

== Watershed ==
Tunungwant Creek drains 315.95 square miles (818.3 km^{2}) of area, receives about 45.8 in/year (116 cm/year) and is about 83.58% forested.

== See also ==
- List of rivers of New York
- List of rivers of Pennsylvania
