= Cattaraugus County, New York =

County in New York, United States

- County
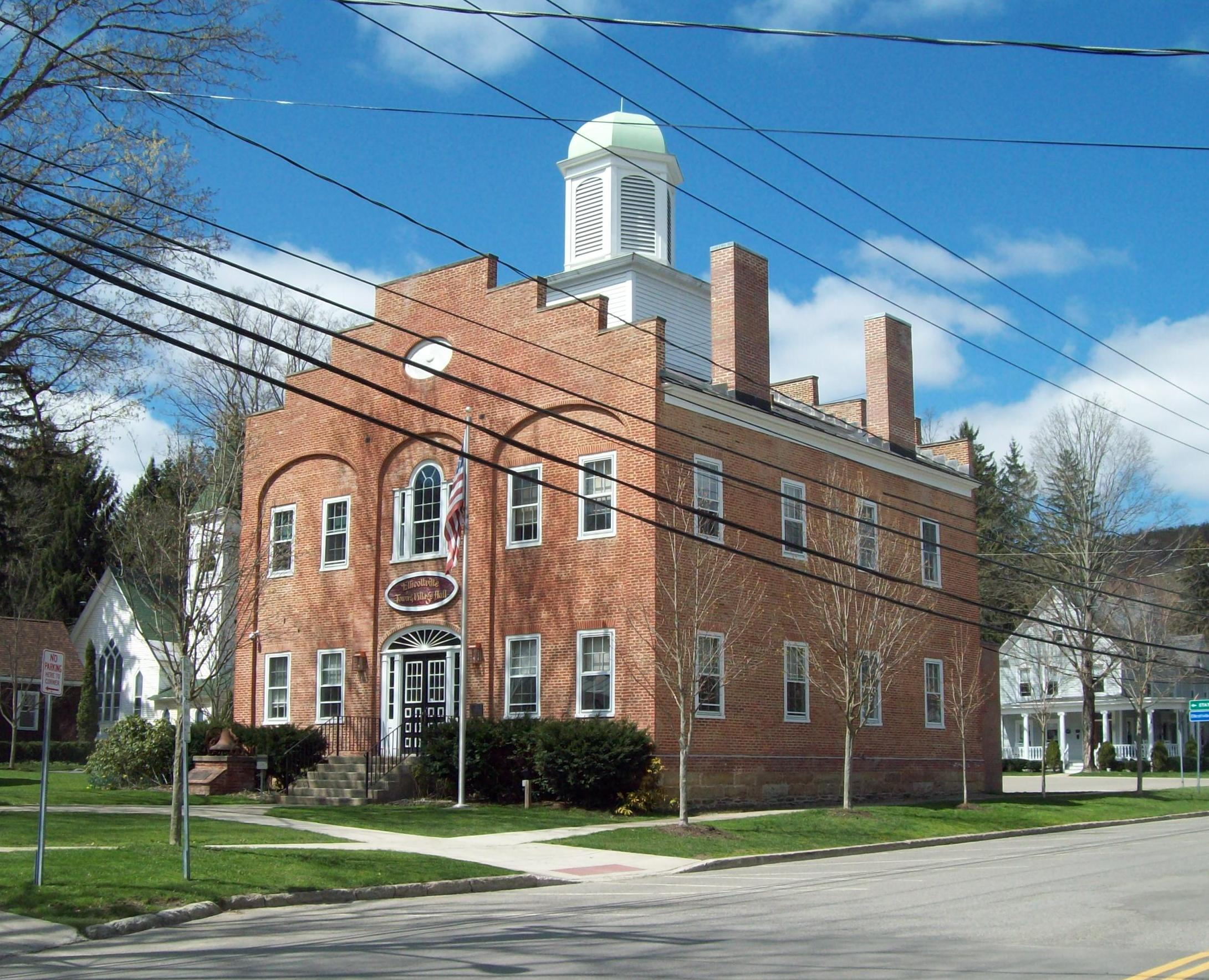
- Ellicottville Town Hall

- Flag Seal

- Location within the U.S. state of New York
- Coordinates: 42°13′49″N 78°38′18″W
- Country: United States
- State: New York
- Founded: March 28, 1817
- Seat: Little Valley
- Largest city: Olean

Area
  - Total: 1,322 sq mi (3,420 km^{2})
  - Land: 1,308 sq mi (3,390 km^{2})
  - Water: 14 sq mi (36 km^{2}) 1.1%

Population (2020)
  - Total: 77,042
  - Estimate (2025): 75,390 ▼
  - Density: 57.6/sq mi (22.2/km^{2})
- Time zone: UTC−5 (Eastern)
  - Summer (DST): UTC−4 (EDT)
- Congressional district: 23rd
- Website: www.cattco.org

Cattaraugus County (locally known as Catt County) is a county in Western New York, with one side bordering Pennsylvania. As of the United States 2020 census, the population was 77,042. The county seat is Little Valley. The county was created in 1808 and later organized in 1817. The county is part of the Western New York region of the state.

Cattaraugus County comprises the Olean, NY Micropolitan Statistical Area, which is included in the Buffalo–Cheektowaga–Olean, NY Combined Statistical Area. Within its boundaries are the Allegany Indian Reservation of the Seneca Nation of New York, and the Allegany State Park. The Allegheny River runs through the county.

== History ==
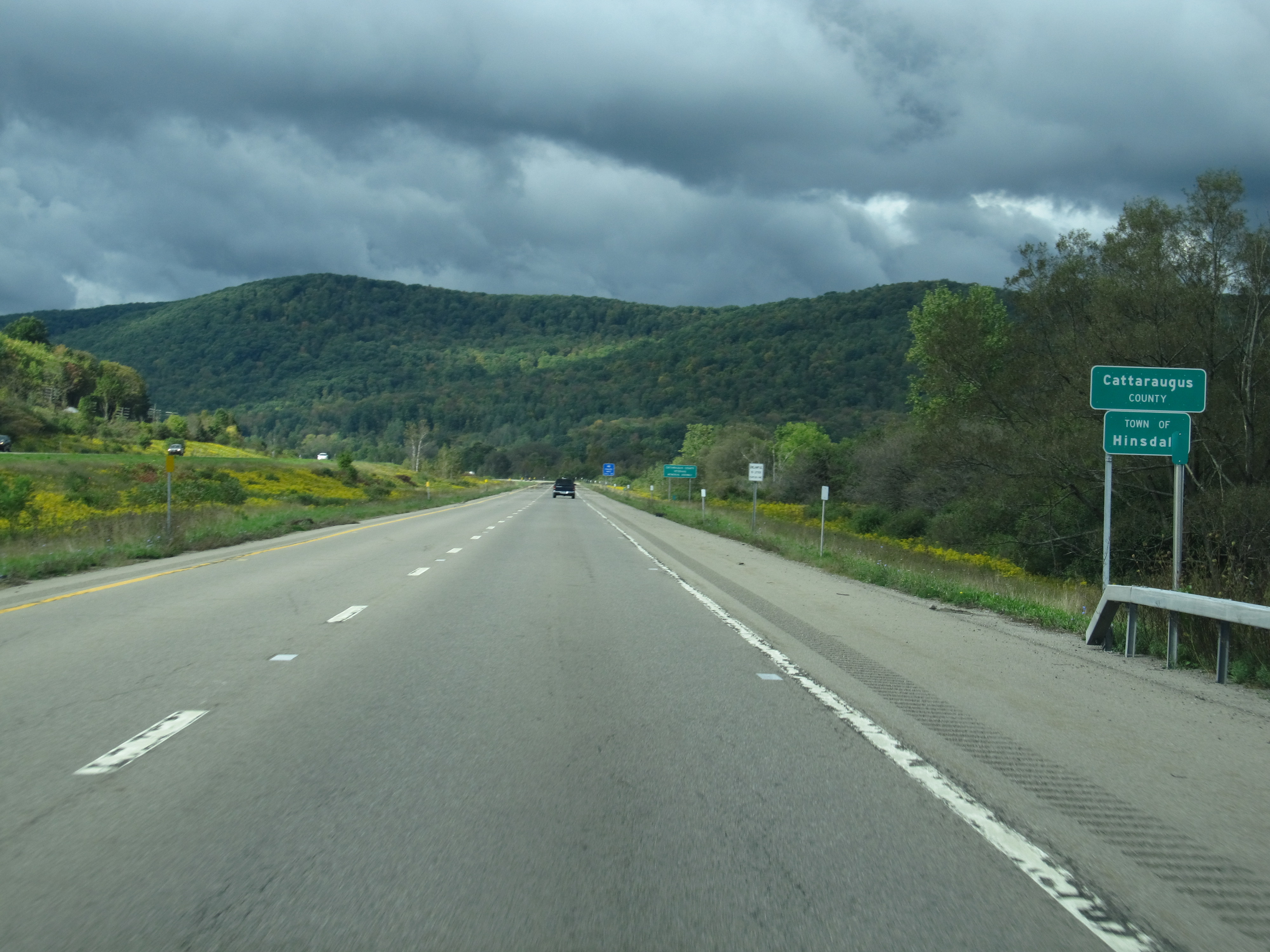
Entering Cattaraugus County on Interstate 86

In the pre-Columbian era, the territory was known to be included in the traditional homelands of the now-extinct Wenrohronon Indians. It later became the territory of the Seneca people, one of the five Nations of the Haudenosaunee.

During the colonial era, it was claimed by at least three British colonies: New York Colony, Massachusetts Bay Colony, and the Province of Pennsylvania, each of which extended their colonial claims to the west until after the Revolutionary War.

When counties were established in the Province of New York in 1683, the territory of Cattaraugus County was included within Albany County. This was an enormous county, including the northern part of New York as well as all of the modern-day state of Vermont and, in theory, extending westward to the Pacific Ocean. As additional areas were settled, the county was reduced on July 3, 1766, by the creation of Cumberland County, and on March 16, 1770, by the creation of Gloucester County, both containing territory now in Vermont.

On March 12, 1772, what was left of Albany County was split into three parts, one remaining under the name Albany County. One of the other pieces, Tryon County, contained the western portion (and thus, since no western boundary was specified, theoretically still extended west to the Pacific). The eastern boundary of Tryon County was approximately five miles west of the present city of Schenectady. The county included the western part of the Adirondack Mountains and the area west of the West Branch of the Delaware River. The area then designated as Tryon County is represented in the 21st century by 37 counties of New York. The county was named for William Tryon, colonial governor of New York.

In the years before 1776, most of the Loyalists in Tryon County fled across the Niagara Frontier into modern day Ontario, Canada. In 1784, following the peace treaty that ended the Revolutionary War (and a treaty with Massachusetts that finally settled who owned Western New York), the name of Tryon County was changed to Montgomery County in honor of the general, Richard Montgomery, who had captured several places in Canada and died attempting to capture the city of Quebec. This replaced the name of the hated British governor.

In practice, however, these counties did not cover modern Cattaraugus County or Western New York. Most of that area lay within the Indian Reserve established in the Treaty of Fort Stanwix by the British; it was intended to be reserved for Native Americans and was ruled off-limits to European settlement.

The newly independent United States sought to extinguish Native reserves after the British ceded their territory east of the Mississippi River and south of the Great Lakes to the United States. This included Iroquois territory in New York; the four nations that had been allies of the British mostly relocated to Ontario, Canada where the Crown gave them land grants in some compensation for losses. The Treaty of Canandaigua, in 1794, extinguished what was left of native title, with the exception of several reservations, three of which were at least partially located in what is now Cattaraugus County.

Ontario County was split from Montgomery County in 1789 as a result of the establishment of the Morris Reserve. In turn, Genesee County was split from Ontario County in 1802 as a result of the Holland Purchase. This period was the beginning of more significant European-American settlement of this western territory. Shortly afterward, Genesee County was reduced in 1806 by the creation of Allegany County.

Cattaraugus County was formed in 1808, split off from Genesee County. At first there was no county government due to the sparse population. From 1812 to 1814, Cattaraugus County was incorporated in Allegany County; from 1814 to 1817, records of the county were divided between Belmont (Allegany County) and Buffalo (then in Niagara County).

The name Cattaraugus derives from a Seneca word for 'bad smelling banks', in reference to the odor of natural gas leaking from rock seams. In 1817, a county government was established for Cattaraugus County in the southwestern corner of the town of Hebe, now Ellicottville.

Numerous towns in the county are named after agents of the Holland Land Company, including Ellicottville (Joseph Ellicott), Franklinville (William Temple Franklin, a speculator and grandson of Benjamin Franklin), and Otto and East Otto (Jacob Otto).

The first settlement in the county was in Olean. After 1860, in response to the construction of a railroad (where the Pat McGee Trail is now), the county seat was moved to Little Valley.

The Allegany Indian Reservation is within the county boundaries and is one of two controlled by the federally recognized Seneca Nation of New York in the western part of the state; the Seneca's other territories, Cattaraugus Reservation and Oil Springs Reservation, are both partially within county boundaries. South of Salamanca, New York, a small city located within the reservation, is Allegany State Park, which is contiguous with the Allegheny National Forest in Pennsylvania.

== Geography ==
According to the U.S. Census Bureau, the county has a total area of 1,322 square miles (3,420 km^{2}), of which 1,308 square miles (3,390 km^{2}) is land and 14 square miles (36 km^{2}) (1.1%) is water.

Cattaraugus County is in the southwestern part of the state, immediately north of the Pennsylvania border, bordering the counties of McKean County, Pennsylvania and Warren County, Pennsylvania. The southern part of Cattaraugus County is the only area of western New York that was not covered by the last ice age glaciation. It is noticeably more rugged than neighboring areas that had peaks rounded and valleys filled by the glacier. The entire area is a dissected plateau of Pennsylvanian and Mississippian age, but appears mountainous to the casual observer. It is this string of mountain-like peaks that gives the county its promotional name, the Enchanted Mountains.

The plateau is an extension of the Allegany Plateau from nearby Pennsylvania. Southern Cattaraugus County is part of the same oil field, and petroleum was formerly a resource of the area. It is now mostly played out, but natural gas continues to be extracted.

A continental divide between the Mississippi River and Great Lakes watersheds runs through Cattaraugus County.

The northern border of the county is formed by Cattaraugus Creek and the Allegheny River flows through the county.

=== Notable geographic features ===
==== Mountains ====
- Mount Tuscarora in Coldspring (formerly Elko)
- Mount Three Sisters, Mount Seneca, Mount Cayuga, Mount Onondaga, Mount Oneida, Mount Mohawk, and Blacksnake Mountain in Red House
- Mount Irvine in Carrollton
- McCarty Hill in Great Valley
- Hartzfelt Mountain and Mount Hermanns in Olean

==== Lakes ====
- Allegheny Reservoir
- Cuba Lake
- Lime Lake
- Quaker Lake
- Red House Lake

==== Rivers and streams ====
- Allegheny River
  - Ischua Creek
  - Tunungwant Creek
    - Bailley Brook
    - Leonard Run
    - Limestone Run
    - Harrisburg Run
  - Great Valley Creek
  - Little Valley Creek
  - Red House Brook
  - Conewango Creek
- Cattaraugus Creek
  - Cattaraugus Creek South Branch

=== Adjacent counties ===
- Erie County - north
- Wyoming County - northeast
- Allegany County - east
- McKean County, Pennsylvania - south
- Warren County, Pennsylvania - southwest
- Chautauqua County - west

== Demographics ==
Historical population
| Census | Pop. | Note | %± |
|---|---|---|---|
| 1820 | 4,090 | | — |
| 1830 | 16,724 | | 308.9% |
| 1840 | 28,872 | | 72.6% |
| 1850 | 38,950 | | 34.9% |
| 1860 | 43,886 | | 12.7% |
| 1870 | 43,909 | | 0.1% |
| 1880 | 55,806 | | 27.1% |
| 1890 | 60,866 | | 9.1% |
| 1900 | 65,643 | | 7.8% |
| 1910 | 65,919 | | 0.4% |
| 1920 | 71,323 | | 8.2% |
| 1930 | 72,398 | | 1.5% |
| 1940 | 72,652 | | 0.4% |
| 1950 | 77,901 | | 7.2% |
| 1960 | 80,187 | | 2.9% |
| 1970 | 81,666 | | 1.8% |
| 1980 | 85,697 | | 4.9% |
| 1990 | 84,234 | | −1.7% |
| 2000 | 83,955 | | −0.3% |
| 2010 | 80,317 | | −4.3% |
| 2020 | 77,042 | | −4.1% |
| 2025 (est.) | 75,390 | ▼ | −2.1% |
U.S. Decennial Census; 1790-1960 1900-90; 1990-2000 2010-20 2025

=== 2020 census ===
Cattaraugus County, New York – Racial and ethnic composition Note: the US Census treats Hispanic/Latino as an ethnic category. This table excludes Latinos from the racial categories and assigns them to a separate category. Hispanics/Latinos may be of any race.
| Race / Ethnicity (NH = Non-Hispanic) | Pop 1980 | Pop 1990 | Pop 2000 | Pop 2010 | Pop 2020 | % 1980 | % 1990 | % 2000 | % 2010 | % 2020 |
|---|---|---|---|---|---|---|---|---|---|---|
| White alone (NH) | 82,845 | 80,757 | 78,934 | 73,849 | 67,554 | 96.67% | 95.87% | 94.02% | 91.95% | 87.68% |
| Black or African American alone (NH) | 599 | 742 | 839 | 966 | 996 | 0.70% | 0.88% | 1.00% | 1.20% | 1.29% |
| Native American or Alaska Native alone (NH) | 1,649 | 1,851 | 2,130 | 2,361 | 2,661 | 1.92% | 2.20% | 2.54% | 2.94% | 3.45% |
| Asian alone (NH) | 208 | 321 | 381 | 524 | 560 | 0.24% | 0.38% | 0.45% | 0.65% | 0.73% |
| Native Hawaiian or Pacific Islander alone (NH) | x | x | 16 | 14 | 9 | x | x | 0.02% | 0.02% | 0.01% |
| Other race alone (NH) | 60 | 29 | 66 | 36 | 212 | 0.07% | 0.03% | 0.08% | 0.04% | 0.28% |
| Mixed race or Multiracial (NH) | x | x | 798 | 1,222 | 3,435 | x | x | 0.95% | 1.52% | 4.46% |
| Hispanic or Latino (any race) | 336 | 534 | 791 | 1,345 | 1,615 | 0.39% | 0.63% | 0.94% | 1.67% | 2.10% |
| Total | 85,697 | 84,234 | 83,955 | 80,317 | 77,042 | 100.00% | 100.00% | 100.00% | 100.00% | 100.00% |

=== 2000 Census ===
As of the census of 2000, there were 83,955 people, 32,023 households, and 21,647 families residing in the county. The population density was 64 people per square mile (25 people/km^{2}). There were 39,839 housing units at an average density of 30 per square mile (12/km^{2}). The racial makeup of the county was 94.63% White, 1.06% Black or African American, 2.60% Native American, 0.46% Asian, 0.02% Pacific Islander, 0.23% from other races, and 1.01% from two or more races. 0.94% of the population were Hispanic or Latino of any race. 26.8% were of German, 13.2% Irish, 11.3% English, 9.1% Polish, 8.2% Italian and 7.4% American ancestry according to Census 2000. 95.2% spoke English and 1.4% Spanish as their first language.

There were 32,023 households, out of which 32.10% had children under the age of 18 living with them, 52.30% were married couples living together, 10.80% had a female householder with no husband present, and 32.40% were non-families. 26.80% of all households were made up of individuals, and 11.60% had someone living alone who was 65 years of age or older. The average household size was 2.52 and the average family size was 3.05.

In the county, the population was spread out, with 26.20% under the age of 18, 9.30% from 18 to 24, 26.50% from 25 to 44, 23.50% from 45 to 64, and 14.60% who were 65 years of age or older. The median age was 37 years. For every 100 females there were 95.90 males. For every 100 females age 18 and over, there were 92.50 males.

The median income for a household in the county was $33,404, and the median income for a family was $39,318. Males had a median income of $30,901 versus $22,122 for females. The per capita income for the county was $15,959. About 10.00% of families and 13.70% of the population were below the poverty line, including 18.60% of those under age 18 and 9.90% of those age 65 or over.

== Transportation ==
=== Major highways ===
- I-86 / NY 17 / Southern Tier Expressway
- U.S. Route 62
- U.S. Route 219
- New York State Route 16
- New York State Route 98
- New York State Route 240
- New York State Route 242
- New York State Route 353
- New York State Route 417

=== Airports ===
Great Valley Airport is located in Cattaraugus County, one nautical mile (1.85 km) southeast of the central business district of Great Valley.

Cattaraugus County-Olean Airport is located outside of Olean located in the Town of Ischua.

=== Bus service ===
Intercity bus service is provided through Coach USA, which runs through the county on its twice-daily Jamestown to Olean route (with connections to Buffalo and New York City). Trailways offers a once-daily north-to-south run between Buffalo and points south in Pennsylvania.

The county does not have a unified public transit system. The Seneca Nation serves much of the county through its own bus line, which connects its reservations; another service, the Olean Area Transit System, connects the cities of Salamanca and Olean.

=== Rail ===
There is no regular passenger rail service in Cattaraugus County; Amtrak does not serve the county. The WNY & PA Railroad, based in Olean, provides freight service on most of the rail routes in Cattaraugus County; the New York and Lake Erie Railroad serves the northwest corner and the Buffalo and Pittsburgh Railroad runs a north-to-south route.

== Government and politics ==
United States presidential election results for Cattaraugus County, New York
| Year | Republican | | Democratic | | Third party(ies) | |
| Year | No. | % | No. | % | No. | % |
|---|---|---|---|---|---|---|
| 1884 | 7,463 | 50.32% | 6,065 | 40.90% | 1,302 | 8.78% |
| 1888 | 8,586 | 54.57% | 6,173 | 39.23% | 975 | 6.20% |
| 1892 | 7,973 | 52.78% | 5,753 | 38.09% | 1,379 | 9.13% |
| 1896 | 9,337 | 58.76% | 6,088 | 38.32% | 464 | 2.92% |
| 1900 | 9,948 | 59.52% | 6,224 | 37.24% | 541 | 3.24% |
| 1904 | 10,182 | 63.96% | 4,923 | 30.93% | 814 | 5.11% |
| 1908 | 9,320 | 56.93% | 6,096 | 37.24% | 955 | 5.83% |
| 1912 | 4,820 | 33.56% | 4,886 | 34.02% | 4,657 | 32.42% |
| 1916 | 8,825 | 54.49% | 6,565 | 40.53% | 807 | 4.98% |
| 1920 | 16,083 | 66.93% | 6,693 | 27.85% | 1,253 | 5.21% |
| 1924 | 17,307 | 63.94% | 5,369 | 19.84% | 4,390 | 16.22% |
| 1928 | 22,135 | 67.07% | 10,229 | 31.00% | 637 | 1.93% |
| 1932 | 18,071 | 58.70% | 11,467 | 37.25% | 1,248 | 4.05% |
| 1936 | 20,484 | 62.10% | 11,901 | 36.08% | 599 | 1.82% |
| 1940 | 22,987 | 65.57% | 11,924 | 34.02% | 144 | 0.41% |
| 1944 | 19,907 | 62.61% | 11,787 | 37.07% | 101 | 0.32% |
| 1948 | 18,246 | 60.03% | 11,289 | 37.14% | 858 | 2.82% |
| 1952 | 24,808 | 68.58% | 11,333 | 31.33% | 34 | 0.09% |
| 1956 | 25,282 | 72.45% | 9,613 | 27.55% | 0 | 0.00% |
| 1960 | 21,749 | 59.47% | 14,797 | 40.46% | 27 | 0.07% |
| 1964 | 10,907 | 33.12% | 21,994 | 66.78% | 32 | 0.10% |
| 1968 | 16,594 | 53.27% | 12,733 | 40.88% | 1,821 | 5.85% |
| 1972 | 21,906 | 66.53% | 10,909 | 33.13% | 112 | 0.34% |
| 1976 | 19,469 | 58.25% | 13,768 | 41.19% | 185 | 0.55% |
| 1980 | 17,222 | 52.65% | 12,917 | 39.49% | 2,570 | 7.86% |
| 1984 | 24,162 | 70.10% | 10,194 | 29.58% | 112 | 0.32% |
| 1988 | 19,691 | 60.72% | 12,447 | 38.38% | 290 | 0.89% |
| 1992 | 13,944 | 39.74% | 10,150 | 28.92% | 10,998 | 31.34% |
| 1996 | 12,971 | 40.99% | 13,029 | 41.17% | 5,643 | 17.83% |
| 2000 | 18,382 | 54.49% | 13,816 | 40.96% | 1,535 | 4.55% |
| 2004 | 20,051 | 58.52% | 13,514 | 39.44% | 701 | 2.05% |
| 2008 | 17,770 | 54.48% | 14,307 | 43.86% | 540 | 1.66% |
| 2012 | 16,569 | 55.66% | 12,649 | 42.49% | 549 | 1.84% |
| 2016 | 19,692 | 63.19% | 9,497 | 30.48% | 1,972 | 6.33% |
| 2020 | 22,155 | 63.74% | 11,879 | 34.17% | 726 | 2.09% |
| 2024 | 22,586 | 66.22% | 11,424 | 33.49% | 97 | 0.28% |

Cattaraugus County is run by a unicameral legislature who appoint a county "administrator". This individual serves many executive duties of a county executive but has no legislative veto power and is not elected.

The legislators are elected independently by districts (while some also serve as mayors of the villages they represent, their status as mayors does not affect in any way their seats on the legislature and thus it is not a Board of Supervisors). The county uses a system of proportional representation in which each legislator's vote is weighted to the number of persons in their district; each district can have between one and three legislators. This system was imposed in the 1960s in the wake of the one man, one vote federal court rulings of the era; before this, the county operated under a true board of supervisors model. There are currently 17 members of the legislature with 16 Republicans and 1 Democrat. Each legislator serves a four-year term, with a limit of three terms.

All but one of those serving on the county council are Republicans, and only two years in the entire history of the county legislature (1992 to 1994) have seen the Democrats in the majority. Howard VanRensselaer, Sr. of Randolph serves as chairman, and Andy Burr serves as vice-chairman. In 2023, the lone Democrat's seat was redistricted out of existence, prompting the local Democratic Party to withdraw from all county legislature races that year in protest.

Cattaraugus County is entirely within the boundaries of the 148th New York State Assembly District (served currently by Joseph Giglio), the 57th New York State Senate District served currently by George Borrello, and the U.S. House of Representatives 23rd district represented by Nick Langworthy. In the last of these, Cattaraugus County's votes proved pivotal in the 2008 elections: incumbent Republican Randy Kuhl, who had strongly carried the county in 2004 and 2006, lost Cattaraugus County to Democrat Eric Massa in the 2008 elections.

The county generally votes for Republicans in most statewide and national offices. For instance, in 2004 George W. Bush defeated John Kerry in Cattaraugus County by a 60–40 margin, although Bill Clinton won Cattaraugus County very narrowly in 1996. In 2006, the county narrowly chose Eliot Spitzer over John Faso by a margin of about 1 percent in the governor's race, and Hillary Clinton defeated John Spencer in the county by a 10 percentage point margin. In all other positions up for office in 2006, Republicans won all congressional and state legislature representatives. In 2008, the county voted for the Republican presidential candidate, with John McCain defeating Barack Obama by a 55-44% margin. In 2010, Republican Carl Paladino carried Cattaraugus County over Democrat (and eventual winner) Andrew Cuomo 65% to 31%. Senator Kirsten Gillibrand and Senator Chuck Schumer, both incumbent Democrats, carried the county by 51% to 46% and 54% to 43% margins, respectively. The county regularly has high turnout for presidential elections, with upwards of 70 percent of eligible voters typically voting in the county. Only three Democrats have carried the county since 1900, with Democrats winning in 1912, 1964, and 1996.

An emerging trend among Cattaraugus County's villages has been consolidation with their surrounding towns. Limestone voters approved dissolution into the Town of Carrollton in September 2009; that took effect at the beginning of 2011. On March 18, 2010, three other villages (East Randolph, Randolph and Perrysburg) followed suit and approved dissolution into their surrounding towns (Town of Randolph for the first two, and Town of Perrysburg for the third); these three villages dissolved at the beginning of 2012.

== Additional facts ==
Two geological formations, both called "Rock City," have the appearance of a town laid out with streets. One is in Olean and the other is in Little Valley.

Olean is the largest city in the county and is the major center for business. Ski country runs through Cattaraugus County; two ski resorts, popular with Canadians, lie in the town of Ellicottville: Holiday Valley Resort and HoliMont; Cattaraugus County once had numerous ski resorts within its bounds, scattered throughout the county, before contracting into Ellicottville alone by 1980. In addition, several snowmobile trails cross the county, including the Pat McGee Trail, a flagship for the county's trail system, and the North Country Trail.

Cattaraugus County is considered part of Appalachia, as well as Western New York, upstate New York, the Southern Tier, the Twin Tiers and the Buffalo-Cheektowaga-Olean Combined Statistical Area. As a result of being at a geographic crossroads, the people of Cattaraugus County speak a variety of accents, ranging from mild variants of Appalachian English to Inland Northern American English, with a handful of people speaking in the more loud and nasal Buffalo English.

The sales tax in Cattaraugus County is 8% (4% from New York, 4% from the county).

A large Amish community is located in the western part of the county; with an estimated 2,500 residents, they constitute slightly under 3% of the county's population. A portion of this community maintains an exceptionally older order that eschews indoor plumbing, which, combined with a small number of Seneca who still live on traditional subsistence, gives the county a high rate of homes without indoor plumbing compared to nearby counties.

There is only one hospital in Cattaraugus County. Olean General Hospital in Olean, New York. The closest other hospitals are UPMC Chautauqua in Jamestown, New York, Bertrand Chaffee Hospital in Springville, New York, and Cuba Memorial Hospital in Cuba, New York,

== Media ==
=== Newspapers ===
- Salamanca Press (weekly, serving central and western Cattaraugus County)
- Olean Times Herald (daily, serving all of the western Twin Tiers)
- Olean Source (free weekly)
- Franklinville Mercury-Gazette (free weekly)
- The Villager (free weekly, based in Ellicottville)
- Randolph Register (monthly)
- Ellicottville Snowed In / The Summer Local (monthly)
- Gowanda—Silver Creek Pennysaver (weekly, published out of Fredonia)
- Pennysaver News (weekly, published by The Buffalo News, which is also distributed throughout the county)

=== Radio stations ===
- WPIG (95.7, Olean)
- WOLY (1450, translator on 107.1, Olean and 105.5 in Carrolton)
- WOLN (91.3, Olean, operated out of Buffalo)
- WQRS (98.3, Salamanca, operated out of Olean, transmitter in Carrollton)
- WGGO (1590, Salamanca, transmitter in Kill Buck, operated out of Williamsville)
- WOEN (1360, translator on 96.3, Olean)
- WMXO (101.5, translator on 101.1, Olean)
- WSBU (88.3, St. Bonaventure)
- WTWT (90.5, transmitter in Allegany, licensed to Bradford, PA, operated out of Russell, PA)
- WCGB (91.9, Franklinville, operated by Family Life Network out of Steuben County)
- WCGS (105.9, Little Valley, operated by Family Life Network out of Steuben County)
- WWG32 (162.425, NOAA Weather Radio service)

WCOR previously operated from 2008 to 2021 out of Portville on 96.7. It has since been relicensed to Lewis Run, Pennsylvania.

Prior to 2014, WKEG-LP operated on 104.7 out of Limestone.

=== Television stations ===
WWHC-LD (channel 20), WVTT-CD (then channel 25) and WBUO-LD (channel 30) were all previously licensed to Olean. All have since been relicensed to Buffalo.

== Education ==
A branch of Jamestown Community College, in Olean provides higher education for residents. Olean Business Institute provided specialized education and is also in Olean; it closed in 2013 due to financial and enrollment declines. Jamestown Business College operates a satellite campus in Salamanca. Cornplanter College, a tribally controlled college, opened in 2014 in Salamanca. St. Bonaventure University is located in its own census-designated place just west of Olean.

Geographical K-12 school districts include:

- Allegany-Limestone Central School District
- Cattaraugus-Little Valley Central School District
- Cuba-Rushford Central School District
- Ellicottville Central School District
- Forestville Central School District
- Franklinville Central School District
- Frewsburg Central School District
- Gowanda Central School District
- Hinsdale Central School District
- Olean City School District
- Pine Valley Central School District (South Dayton)
- Portville Central School District
- Randolph Central School District
- Salamanca City School District
- Springville-Griffith Institute Central School
- West Valley Central School District
- Yorkshire-Pioneer Central School District

Additionally Randolph Academy Union Free School District includes two institutions that care for children, with one of them being in the county.

== Communities ==
=== Larger Settlements ===
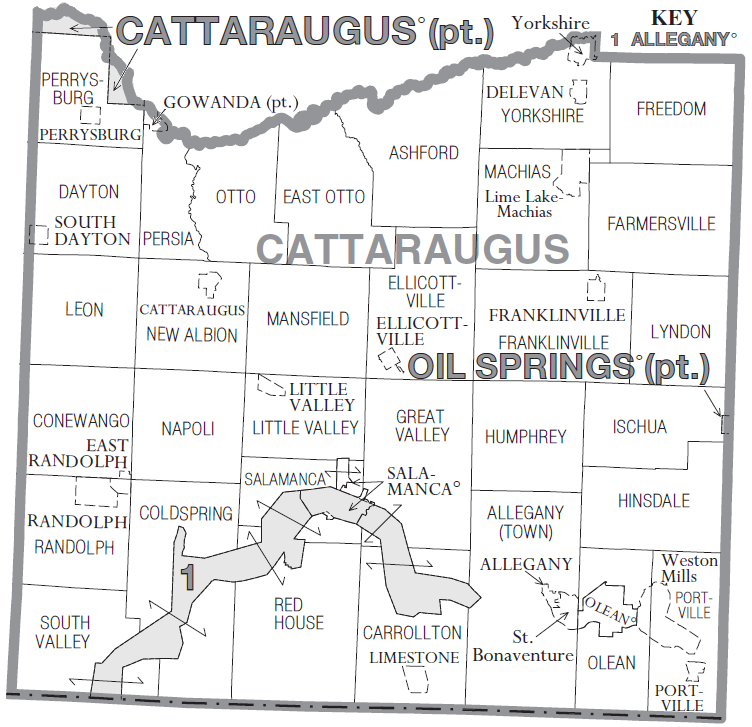
Cattaraugus County divisions

| # | Location | Population | Type | Sector |
|---|---|---|---|---|
| 1 | Olean | 13,437 | City | Southeast |
| 2 | Salamanca | 5,929 | City | Southwest |
| 3 | ‡Gowanda | 2,709 | Village | Northwest |
| 4 | St. Bonaventure | 2,044 | CDP | Southeast |
| 5 | Allegany | 1,816 | Village | Southeast |
| 6 | Franklinville | 1,740 | Village | Northeast |
| 7 | Weston Mills | 1,472 | CDP/Hamlet | Southeast |
| 8 | ††Randolph | 1,286 | CDP/Hamlet | Southwest |
| 9 | Yorkshire | 1,180 | CDP | Northeast |
| 10 | †Little Valley | 1,143 | Village | Northwest |
| 11 | Delevan | 1,089 | Village | Northeast |
| 12 | Portville | 1,014 | Village | Southeast |
| 13 | Cattaraugus | 1,002 | Village | Northwest |
| 14 | Lime Lake | 867 | CDP | Northeast |
| 15 | ††East Randolph | 620 | CDP/Hamlet | Southwest |
| 15 | South Dayton | 620 | Village | Northwest |
| 17 | West Valley | 518 | CDP | Northeast |
| 18 | Machias | 471 | CDP | Northeast |
| 19 | ††Perrysburg | 401 | CDP | Northwest |
| 20 | ††Limestone | 389 | CDP/Hamlet | Southeast |
| 21 | Ellicottville | 376 | Village | Northeast |

†† - Former Village

† - County Seat

‡ - Not Wholly in this county

*Note that data is only available for Salamanca and Olean.

=== Towns ===
- Allegany
- Ashford
- Carrollton
- Coldspring
- Conewango
- Dayton
- East Otto
- Elko (dissolved 1965)
- Ellicottville
- Farmersville
- Franklinville
- Freedom
- Great Valley
- Hinsdale
- Humphrey
- Ischua
- Leon
- Little Valley
- Lyndon
- Machias
- Mansfield
- Napoli
- New Albion
- Olean
- Otto
- Perrysburg
- Persia
- Portville
- Randolph
- Red House
- Salamanca
- South Valley
- Yorkshire

=== Hamlets ===
- Bedford Corners
- Farmersville Station
- Jimerson Town
- Kill Buck
- Sandusky
- Steamburg
- Versailles

=== Indian reservations ===
- Allegany Reservation
- Cattaraugus Reservation
- Oil Springs Reservation

== Notable people ==
- Bill Bergey, professional football player
- Governor Blacksnake, Seneca war chief and possibly the world's oldest man
- Ray Caldwell of Salamanca, MLB pitcher
- William R. Case of Little Valley, founder of the eponymous knife company
- Anna Botsford Comstock, 1854–1930, artist, Cornell professor, leader of nature study movement
- Chuck Crist of Salamanca, professional football player
- Carlos L. Douglass, farmer and Wisconsin State Assemblyman
- Brian Dunkleman of Ellicottville, co-host of the first season of American Idol
- Ray Evans (1915–2007) of Salamanca, member of famous songwriting duo alongside Jay Livingston
- Ira Joe Fisher of Salamanca and Little Valley, poet and television weatherman at CBS
- James F. Hastings of Olean, retired former U.S. Congressman (served from 1969 to 1976)
- William C. Hayward (1847-1917), Iowa Secretary of State
- Marvin "Marv" Hubbard of Red House, professional football player
- Riki Lindhome of Portville, actress and member of the satirical musical group "Garfunkel and Oates"
- Ted Marchibroda, NFL Head Coach of Baltimore Colts/Ravens, attended St. Bonaventure University
- Paul Owens (1924–2003) of Salamanca, professional baseball player, manager, and executive
- Terrence Pegula of Allegany, multibillionaire natural gas tycoon and professional sports investor
- Kimberly Pressler of Franklinville, Miss USA 1999
- Isaac Seneca of Cattaraugus, professional football player
- Margaret Shulock of Franklinville, cartoonist, part of the ensemble behind the Six Chix comic strip
- Peter Tomarken (1942–2006) of Olean, host of Press Your Luck
- Lyman M. Ward, Union Army Brigadier General
- Louis Zamperini of Olean, Olympic distance runner and World War II prisoner of war

== See also ==
- List of counties in New York
- National Register of Historic Places listings in Cattaraugus County, New York
