= Limestone, New York =

- Hamlet and CDP
- Location within the state of New York
- Coordinates: 42°1′34″N 78°37′59″W
- Country: United States
- State: New York
- County: Cattaraugus
- Town: Carrollton
- Incorporated: December 7, 1877
- Dissolved: December 31, 2010

Area
  - Total: 1.70 sq mi (4.40 km^{2})
  - Land: 1.69 sq mi (4.37 km^{2})
  - Water: 0.012 sq mi (0.03 km^{2})
- Elevation: 1,410 ft (430 m)

Population (2020)
  - Total: 358
  - Density: 212.2/sq mi (81.94/km^{2})
- Time zone: UTC-5 (Eastern (EST))
  - Summer (DST): UTC-4 (EDT)
- ZIP code: 14753
- Area code: 716
- FIPS code: 36-42378
- GNIS feature ID: 0955350

Limestone is a hamlet (and census-designated place) in Cattaraugus County, New York, United States. As of the 2020 census, Limestone had a population of 358.

The former village lies in the southern part of the town of Carrollton and is 6 miles (10 km) north of the city of Bradford, Pennsylvania. The name is said to derive from the rapid deterioration of some excavated skeletons, which quickly became white dust upon exposure to air.

== History ==
The village of Limestone was incorporated in 1877. In 2008, 187 village residents signed a petition calling for the village's dissolution. It was predicted that as a result of dissolution, both village and town residents would see their taxes decrease, by four and 46 percent respectively. Additionally, the town would receive $750,000 in state aid. The village's incorporation was dissolved following the successful passage of a referendum on October 13, 2009; the dissolution took effect January 1, 2011. Of the village's 229 registered voters, 97 voted, 71 of them in favor of dissolution.

The Limestone Central School District (mascot: the Tigers) was headquartered in the village until 1995, when it merged with Allegany Central School to form the current Allegany-Limestone Central School. The school building remained open as an elementary school until 2010, by which point attendance at the building had dropped to 67 students, well below what would have been needed to support it.

== Geography ==
Limestone is located at 42°1′34″N 78°37′59″W (42.026029, -78.632983).

According to the United States Census Bureau, the former village has a total area of 1.6 square miles (4.2 km^{2}), of which 0.01 square miles (0.03 km^{2}), or 0.64%, is water.

The hamlet is 2 miles (3 km) north of the state line of Pennsylvania. Limestone is located on U.S. Route 219, and is on the east side of the Allegany State Park. Tunungwant Creek (also known as "Tuna Creek"), a tributary of the Allegheny River, flows south to north along the village's western side. Nichols Run flows from the east through the center of the hamlet.

== Demographics ==
Historical population
Census	Pop.	Note	%±
2020	358		—
U.S. Decennial Census

As of the census of 2000, there were 411 people, 170 households, and 109 families residing in the then-village. The population density was 252.3 inhabitants per square mile (97.4/km^{2}). There were 188 housing units at an average density of 115.4 per square mile (44.6/km^{2}). The racial makeup of the village was 97.08% White, 0.24% African American, 1.22% Native American, and 1.46% from two or more races. Hispanic or Latino of any race were 0.73% of the population.

There were 170 households, out of which 29.4% had children under the age of 18 living with them, 50.6% were married couples living together, 10.0% had a female householder with no husband present, and 35.3% were non-families. 31.8% of all households were made up of individuals, and 15.3% had someone living alone who was 65 years of age or older. The average household size was 2.42 and the average family size was 2.93.

The population was spread out, with 24.6% under the age of 18, 7.3% from 18 to 24, 29.0% from 25 to 44, 24.3% from 45 to 64, and 14.8% who were 65 years of age or older. The median age was 39 years. For every 100 females, there were 93.0 males. For every 100 females age 18 and over, there were 81.3 males.

The median income for a household was $28,594, and the median income for a family was $33,125. Males had a median income of $24,583 versus $18,846 for females. The per capita income was $14,152. About 5.0% of families and 8.8% of the population were below the poverty line, including 8.9% of those under age 18 and 7.5% of those age 65 or over.
