= List of county routes in Cattaraugus County, New York =

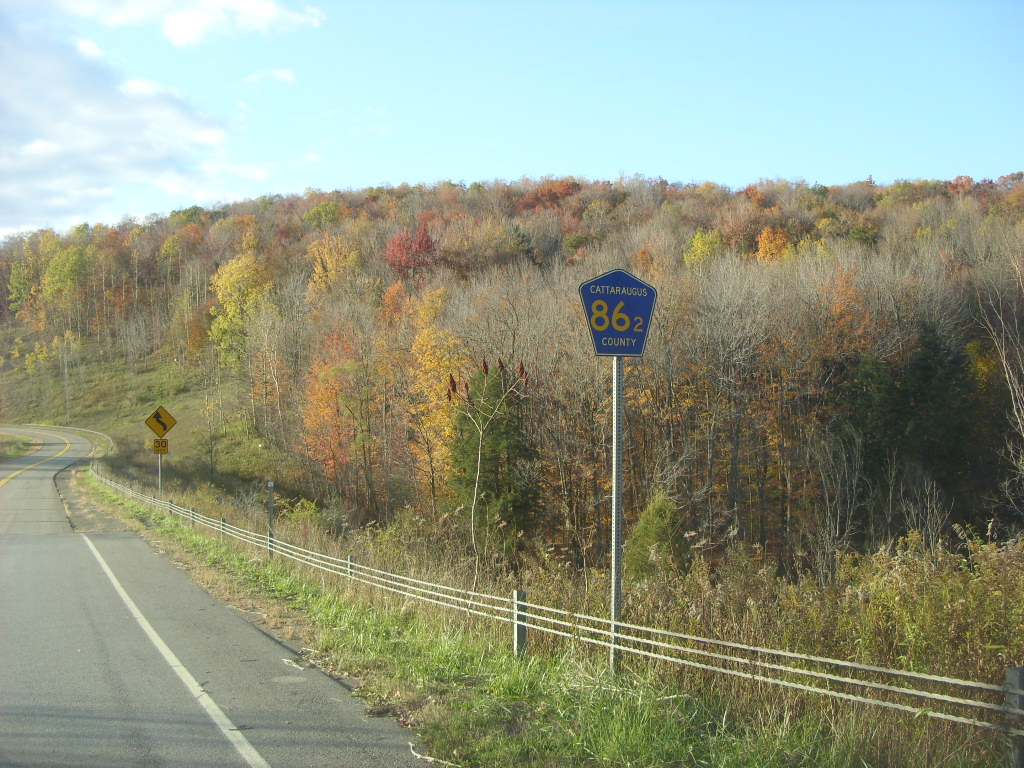
- Example of signage in Cattaraugus County, with CR 86-2 in Ashford.

Highway names
- Interstates: Interstate X (I-X)
- US Highways: U.S. Route X (US X)
- State: New York State Route X (NY X)
- County: County Route X (CR X)

System links
- New York Highways; Interstate; US; State; Reference; Parkways

County routes in Cattaraugus County, New York, are signed with the Manual on Uniform Traffic Control Devices-standard yellow-on-blue pentagon route marker. A handful of pre-MUTCD black-on-yellow rectangular markers still exist on the most remote county road intersections (Cattaraugus County did not switch to the MUTCD markers until the late 1990s). With one exception, county routes in Cattaraugus County are not signed with direction markers (e.g. North–South or East–West); one location on Route 10 in Coldspring has signs bearing North and South markers.

As a general rule, Cattaraugus County does not maintain routes within reservations, villages or cities. For routes that enter such municipalities, county maintenance (and the route number) usually stops at the municipal border, with the exceptions of CR 4, which enters the village of Gowanda, and CR 12, which does enter the village of Cattaraugus. Every town in Cattaraugus County except for Red House has at least one county route within its borders.

== Routes 1–50 ==
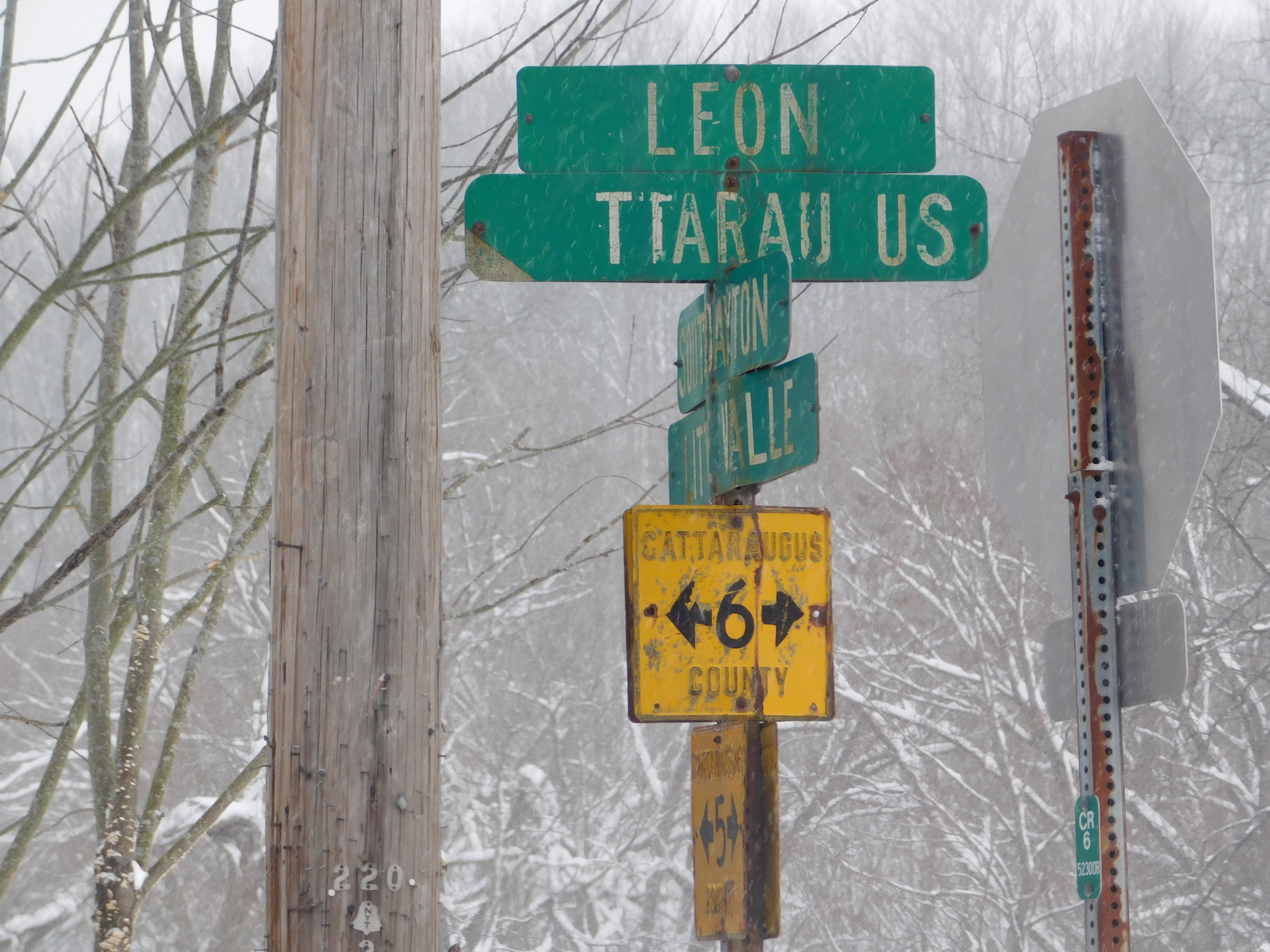
Examples of former signage practices in Cattaraugus County at the hamlet of New Albion. Prior to the late 1990s, black-on-yellow rectangles such as this marked county routes; only this and a crossroads in Maples still have them.

Route	Length (mi)	Length (km)	From	Via	To	Notes
CR 2	7.03	11.31	South Dayton village line in Dayton	Cottage and Edwards Corners roads	NY 39 in Perrysburg	
CR 3			South Dayton village line	Dexter Corners Road in Dayton	US 62	Turned over to New York State in 1980, now NY 322
CR 4	6.85	11.02	NY 353 in Persia	Broadway Road	Beech Street in Gowanda	
CR 5	11.97	19.26	NY 353 in Dayton	Mosher Hollow and Little Valley–New Albion roads	NY 353 in Little Valley	Part east of CR 6 was formerly part of NY 18F
CR 6	11.77	18.94	Chautauqua County line in Leon (becomes CR 70)	Leon Road	NY 353 in New Albion	Part north of CR 5 was formerly part of NY 18F
CR 7	10.11	16.27	Former East Randolph village line in Conewango	Elm Creek and Pigeon Valley road	CR 5 in New Albion	
CR 8	5.49	8.84	Chautauqua County line (becomes CR 42)	Bowen Road in Randolph	Former Randolph village line	
CR 9	2.94	4.73	Former Randolph village line in Randolph	Price Corners and Coldspring Roads	NY 394 in Coldspring	
CR 10	12.44	20.02	NY 394 / NY 951T in Coldspring	Lebanon, Hardscrabble, Allegany, and Farm To Market roads	CR 6 in New Albion	
CR 11	4.46	7.18	CR 12	North Otto Road in Otto	CR 56	
CR 12	17.94	28.87	NY 353 in Cattaraugus	Washington, Ellicott, and Jefferson streets and East Otto and Edies roads	Erie County line in Ashford (becomes CR 82)	Discontinuous at US 219; part southwest of CR 14 was designated NY 264 from 1930 to c. 1932
CR 13	9.76	15.71	CR 12 in Otto	Maples Road	Ellicottville village line in Ellicottville	
CR 14	11.19	18.01	Little Valley village line in Little Valley	North Ninth Street Extension, Toad Hollow and Reed Hill roads	CR 12 / CR 75 in East Otto	
CR 14A	0.2	0.3	NY 353	Buelow Road in Mansfield	CR 14	
CR 15	3.89	6.26	NY 242 in Little Valley	Dublin Road	NY 242 in Mansfield	
CR 16	6.73	10.83	NY 240 / CR 32 in Ashford	Roszyk Hill Road	NY 16 / CR 20 / CR 62 in Machias	Former routing of NY 242
CR 17	4.68	7.53	NY 242 in Franklinville	Bakerstand Road	Franklinville village village line in Franklinville	
CR 18	13.82	22.24	US 219 / NY 98 in Great Valley	Humphrey Road	NY 16 in Franklinville	
CR 19	13.95	22.45	CR 60 in Allegany	Five Mile Road	NY 16 in Franklinville	
CR 20	5.93	9.54	NY 16 / CR 16 / CR 62 in Machias	McKinstry and Block roads	Delevan village line in Yorkshire	
CR 21	9.48	15.26	Delevan village line in Yorkshire	Delevan Avenue, School Street, and Elton Road	NY 98 in Farmersville	
CR 22	3.84	6.18	CR 21	Maple Grove Road in Freedom	NY 98	
CR 23	2.18	3.51	NY 98	Freedom Road in Freedom	Allegany County line (becomes CR 3)	
CR 24	10.40	16.74	Franklinville village village line in Franklinville	Abbott Road	Allegany County line in Ischua (becomes CR 7C)	
CR 25	2.43	3.91	Allegany County line (becomes CR 7)	Rawson Road in Lyndon	Allegany County line (becomes CR 7A)	
CR 26	6.31	10.15	NY 16 in Hinsdale	Main Street and Gile Hollow and Maple Hill roads	CR 19 in Hinsdale	
CR 27	7.37	11.86	NY 417 in Portville	Haskell Road	Allegany County line in Hinsdale (becomes CR 6)	
CR 29	3.58	5.76	Pennsylvania state line	Barnum Road in Olean	NY 16	
CR 30 (1)	1.81	2.91	Allegany town line	Chipmunk Road in Carrollton	CR 30 (segment 2)	
CR 30 (2)	1.02	1.64	Allegany Indian Reservation boundary	South Nine Mile Road in Carrollton	Allegany Indian Reservation boundary	
CR 31	0.90	1.45	Pennsylvania state line in Carrollton	Parkside Drive in Carrollton	Limestone village line	Former number; decommissioned after 1975 and turned over to Carrollton for maintenance.
CR 32	13.47	21.68	NY 242 in Ashford	West Valley Road	Erie County line in Ashford (becomes CR 198)	Entire length overlaps with NY 240
CR 33	6.27	10.09	Chautauqua County line (becomes CR 36)	Bone Run Road in South Valley	West Bank Perimeter Road (NY 950A)	
CR 35	2.36	3.80	US 62 in Dayton	Meyers Corners Road	CR 5 in Leon	
CR 36	3.28	5.28	NY 16 in Machias	Lake Street and Lake and Lime Lake roads	CR 21 in Freedom	
CR 37	1.52	2.45	NY 16 / NY 242	Junction Road in Machias	CR 70	Former number; decommissioned between 2008 and 2013 and turned over to the town of Machias.
CR 38	3.05	4.91	McCarty Hill State Forest	Mutton Hollow Road in Great Valley	US 219	
CR 39	2.51	4.04	CR 10	Lebanon Road in Coldspring	NY 394	
CR 40	5.49	8.84	NY 241	Seager Hill Road in Conewango	CR 7	
CR 42	3.78	6.08	Chautauqua County line (becomes CR 88)	Versailles–Silver Creek Road in Perrysburg	Cattaraugus Indian Reservation boundary in Versailles	Roadway continues to NY 438
CR 43			Lonkto Hollow Road	Bay State Road in Red House	NY 17/NY 382	Decommissioned on April 14, 1971; the northern portion of the road was substantially rerouted during Southern Tier Expressway construction, with what remains of the route now maintained by the town of Red House.
CR 44	2.91	4.68	US 62 in Conewango	Flat Iron Road	US 62 in Leon	
CR 45	0.55	0.89	PA 546 in Allegany	Duke Center Road	NY 16 in Allegany	Former number; turned over to the town of Allegany for maintenance c. 2014.
CR 46	9.22	14.84	Franklinville village line in Franklinville	Bullockville Road	Allegany County line in Lyndon (becomes CR 7A)	
CR 47	4.45	7.16	CR 24	Lyndon Center Road in Lyndon	Allegany County line (becomes CR 7A)	
CR 48	2.34	3.77	NY 16 in Ischua	Ischua–Lyndon Road	CR 24 / CR 63 in Lyndon	
CR 49	1.82	2.93	NY 417 / US 219 Business	Killbuck Road in Great Valley	US 219	
CR 50	0.75	1.21	NY 446	Oil Spring Road in Ischua	Allegany County line (becomes CR 7D)	Discontinuous at Oil Springs Reservation limits

== Routes 51 and up ==
Route	Length (mi)	Length (km)	From	Via	To	Notes
CR 51	3.36	5.41	CR 19 in Allegany	Chapel Hill Road	CR 18 in Humphrey	
CR 53	3.70	5.95	US 219	Ashford Hollow Road in Ashford	NY 240 / CR 32	
CR 54	1.39	2.24	NY 16	Old Olean Road in Yorkshire	NY 39	Former number; former routing of NY 16
CR 55	5.68	9.14	NY 240 / CR 32 in Ashford	Gooseneck Road	CR 20 in Yorkshire	
CR 56	1.02	1.64	Dake Hill Road	Forty Road in Otto	CR 11	
CR 57	5.64	9.08	NY 353	Markham Road in Dayton	CR 2	
CR 58	6.82	10.98	US 62 in Dayton	Peck Hill and North roads	CR 42 in Perrysburg	Discontinuous between NY 39 and former Perrysburg village line; part south of NY 39 was formerly part of NY 353
CR 59	4.38	7.05	NY 16	Johnson Hollow Road in Ischua	Oil Springs Reservation boundary	
CR 60	8.40	13.52	Allegany Indian Reservation boundary in Allegany	Nine Mile and River roads	Olean city line in Olean	
CR 61	4.59	7.39	Knapp Creek Road	Four Mile Road in Allegany	CR 60	Former number; decommissioned after 1975 and turned over to the town of Allegany.
CR 62	1.17	1.88	NY 242	Maple Avenue in Machias	NY 16 / CR 16 / CR 20	
CR 63	5.51	8.87	NY 16 in Franklinville	East Hill Road	CR 24 / CR 48 in Lyndon	
CR 64	0.20	0.32	Chautauqua County line	Bush Road in Conewango	US 62	Overlaps with CR 67 along Chautauqua County line
CR 65	1.26	2.03	Former Randolph village line in Randolph	Fish Hatchery and Weeden roads	NY 394 in Coldspring	
CR 67	2.15	3.46	US 219	Peth Road in Great Valley	CR 18	
CR 68	3.08	4.96	CR 11 in Otto	Swamp Road	CR 12 in East Otto	
CR 69	3.61	5.81	CR 18	Cadiz Road in Franklinville	CR 17	
CR 70	1.95	3.14	NY 16	Hazelmere Avenue and Lake Street in Machias	CR 36	Former number; decommissioned between 2008 and 2013 and turned over to town of Machias.
CR 71	4.67	7.52	Ellicottville village line in Ellicottville	Sugartown and Farm To Market Roads	NY 98 in Great Valley	
CR 72			Erie County line (became CR 225)	McKinstry and Creek roads in Yorkshire	NY 16 / NY 39	Former number
CR 73	4.83	7.77	CR 21 in Freedom	Marble Springs and California Hill	Delevan village line in Yorkshire	
CR 74	4.01	6.45	CR 19 in Ischua	Dutch Hill Road	CR 26 in Hinsdale	
CR 75	10.09	16.24	CR 12 / CR 13 in East Otto	East Flats, Plato and Beaver Meadow roads	NY 240 / CR 32 in Ellicottville	
CR 76	2.09	3.36	NY 353	Lovers Lane Road in New Albion	CR 12	
CR 77	0.53	0.85	US 219 / CR 85	Henrietta Road in Ashford	Scoby Road	Former number; turned over to town of Ashford for maintenance c. 2014.
CR 78	4.35	7.00	NY 39	West Perrysburg Road in Perrysburg	CR 42	
CR 79	2.59	4.17	CR 27	Wolf Run Road in Portville	Allegany County line	Former number
CR 80	4.66	7.50	NY 98	Laidlaw Road in Farmersville	CR 21	
CR 81	3.30	5.31	NY 16	Airport Road in Ischua	CR 48	
CR 82	1.20	1.93	NY 16	Old Rock City Road in Allegany	NY 16	Former number; traded to the town of Allegany in September 1973 for Windfall and Dugan Roads (current CR 92).
CR 83	2.86	4.60	CR 19 in Allegany	Back Olean Road	Olean city line in Olean	
CR 84	0.39	0.63	NY 39	Aldrich Street in Gowanda	Erie County line at Cattaraugus Creek (continues as CR 503)	Former number; decommissioned after 1975 and turned over to Gowanda for maintenance.
CR 85	7.10	11.43	CR 53	Rock Springs and Schwartz roads in Ashford	CR 100	
CR 86-1	3.05	4.91	NY 240 / CR 32	Thornwood Drive in Ashford	CR 85	
CR 86-2	0.81	1.30	Dead end	Buttermilk Road in Ashford	NY 240 / CR 32	
CR 87	2.90	4.67	CR 81	Yankee Road in Ischua	CR 24	
CR 88	0.94	1.51	NY 353	Baker Road in Little Valley	NY 242	
CR 89	5.03	8.10	Chautauqua County line (becomes CR 34)	Sawmill Run Road in South Valley	West Bank Perimeter Road (NY 950A)	
CR 90	2.02	3.25	CR 73	Bixby Hill Road in Freedom	Wyoming County line (becomes CR 59)	
CR 92	3.25	5.23	NY 417	Dugan and Windfall roads in Olean	Olean city line	The roads were acquired in September 1973 from the town of Allegany in return for CR 82.
CR 93	0.50	0.80	Dutch Hill Road	Farwell Road in Ischua	NY 16	
CR 94	0.88	1.42	Salamanca city line (becomes NY 950B)	West State Street in Salamanca	NY 353	
CR 95	0.3	0.48	NY 98	Osmun Road in Farmersville	Freedom town line	Former number; decommissioned after 1975 and turned over to Farmersville for maintenance.
CR 96	0.24	0.39	NY 353	Killborn Corners Road in Little Valley	NY 242	Former routing of NY 353
CR 100	0.92	1.48	US 219	Miller Road in Ashford	Erie County line	Former routing of US 219, designated by 2014.
CR 101	0.42	0.68	US 219	Peters Road in Ashford	CR 12	
CR 212	0.36	0.58	CR 12	Mill Street in East Otto	CR 12	

== See also ==
- County routes in New York
- List of former state routes in New York (201–300)
