= New York State Route 242 =

State highway in Cattaraugus County, New York, US

New York State Route 242
- Map of Cattaraugus County with NY 242 highlighted in red

Route information
- Maintained by NYSDOT
- Length: 31.96 mi (51.43 km)
- Existed: 1930–present

Major junctions
- West end: NY 394 in Coldspring
- US 219 in Ellicottville
- East end: NY 16 in Machias

Location
- Country: United States
- State: New York
- Counties: Cattaraugus

Highway system
- New York Highways; Interstate; US; State; Reference; Parkways
← NY 241	→ NY 243

New York State Route 242 (NY 242) is a state highway that runs across Cattaraugus County, New York, in the United States. Although signed as an east–west route, it takes a more northeast–southwest course across the county from NY 394 near the hamlet of Randolph in the town of Coldspring to NY 16 in Machias. The western end between Randolph and Little Valley was the western half of the short-lived New York State Route 17H. The eastern half of NY 17H was the southern end of NY 353 from Little Valley to Salamanca.

== Route description ==
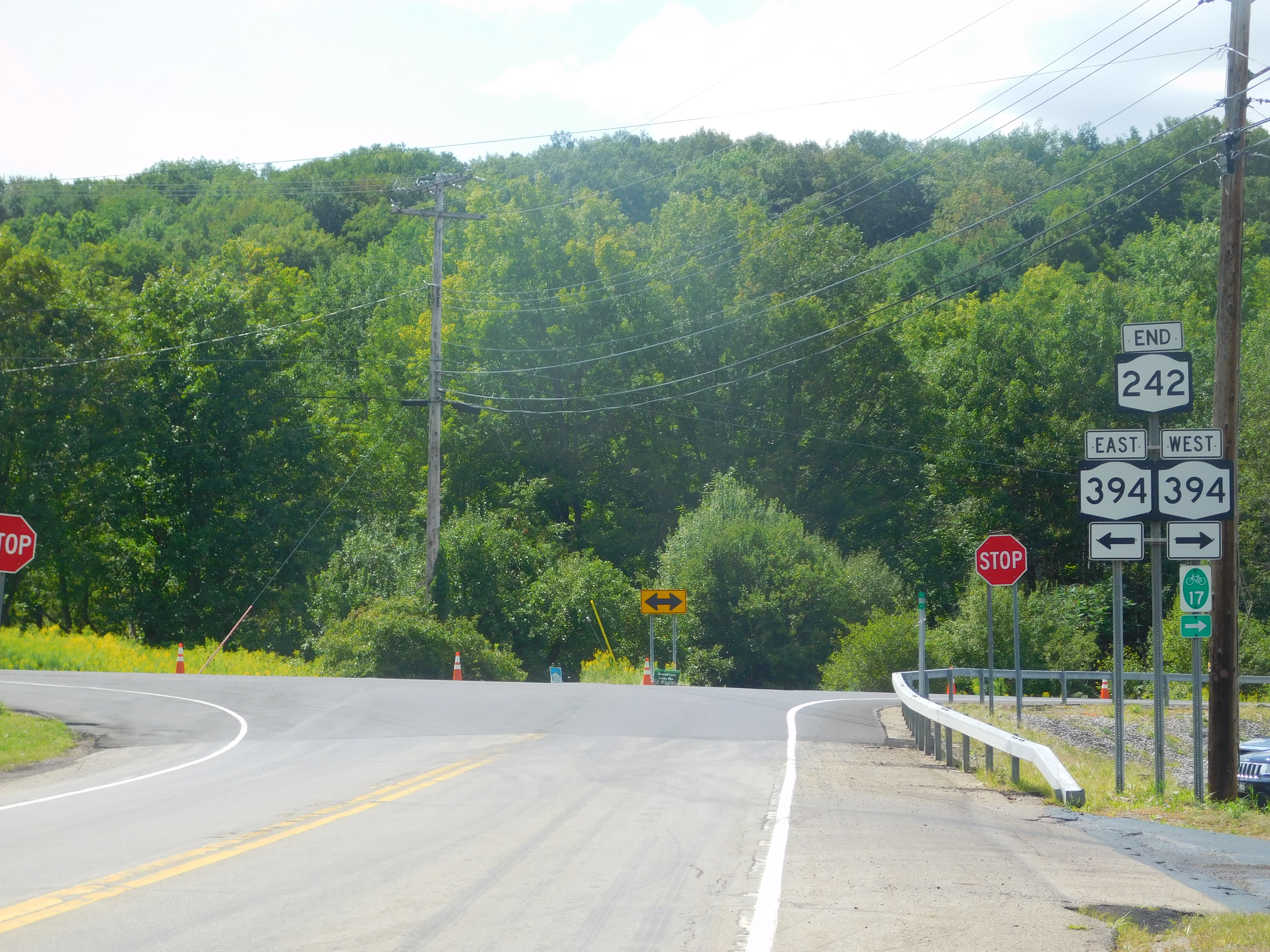
NY 242 at the junction with NY 394 in Coldspring

NY 242 begins at an intersection with NY 394 just north of Stillson Pond in Coldspring. NY 242 proceeds northeast through Coldspring on a two-lane rural road that crosses from Coldspring to the town of Napoli. The route winds northeast, intersecting with Jamestown Road, where it turns eastward. At Manley Hill Road, NY 242 bends northeast into a junction with County Route 10 (Allegany Road). The surroundings along NY 242 do not change much as it continues northeast, and after several miles and one large hill, residences become more sporadic. Just south of the intersection of Kyler Hill Road, the route leaves Napoli and crosses into the town of Little Valley.

Paralleling a nearby brook, NY 242 crosses northeast through a small portion of the town of Little Valley, crossing into the Little Valley village a short distance later. Now named Fair Oak Street, NY 242 crosses through the county seat into the center of the village. Turning eastward along Fair Oak Street, NY 242 becomes a two-lane residential street, reaching an intersection with NY 353 (Erie Street). At this junction, NY 242 and NY 353 become concurrent, turning southeast along Rock City Road, a two-lane residential street. Just west of the junction with Hill Street, the routes turn east and cross over the Pat McGee Trail (the former Erie Railroad Allegany Division which ran to Dunkirk from Salamanca, and later the New York and Lake Erie Railroad). Just east of the right-of-way, NY 242 and NY 353 forks in different directions, connected by a junction with CR 96 (Kilburne Corners Road). NY 242 continues eastward, making a gradual bend to the north into a junction with CR 88 (Baker Road). Following the valley of Dublin Hollow, NY 242 intersects with the southern terminus of CR 15 (Dublin Road) and turns east into the McCarty Hill State Forest. Climbing a steep hill northeast, the route leaves Little Valley for the town of Mansfield and intersects with the other terminus of CR 15. At the junction with Windsor Road and the summit of the hill, NY 242 bends eastward for a short stretch, entering a small residential section as the route leaves Mansfield and descends steeply toward the village of Ellicottville. In Ellicottville, NY 242 gains the moniker of West Washington Street, paralleling Sunset Hill Cemetery and crossing the Finger Lakes Trail before entering the village into downtown, where the route intersects with US 219 (Jefferson Street).

US 219 and NY 242 become concurrent at the junction of Jefferson and Washington, running northeast through the village as a two-lane commercial street along the Great Valley Creek. At the junction with Mill Street, US 219 and NY 242 take East Washington Street northeast along Great Valley Creek, entering the town of Ellicottville. The two routes fork nearby as NY 242 winds northeast along the creek through Ellicottville, paralleling railroad tracks into the hamlet of Ashford Junction, where it intersects with the southern terminus of NY 240. The route continues northeast out of Ashford, crossing the railroad tracks a short distance from NY 240. Making a more east-northeast progression, NY 242 crosses into the town of Franklinville and the hamlet of Devereaux.

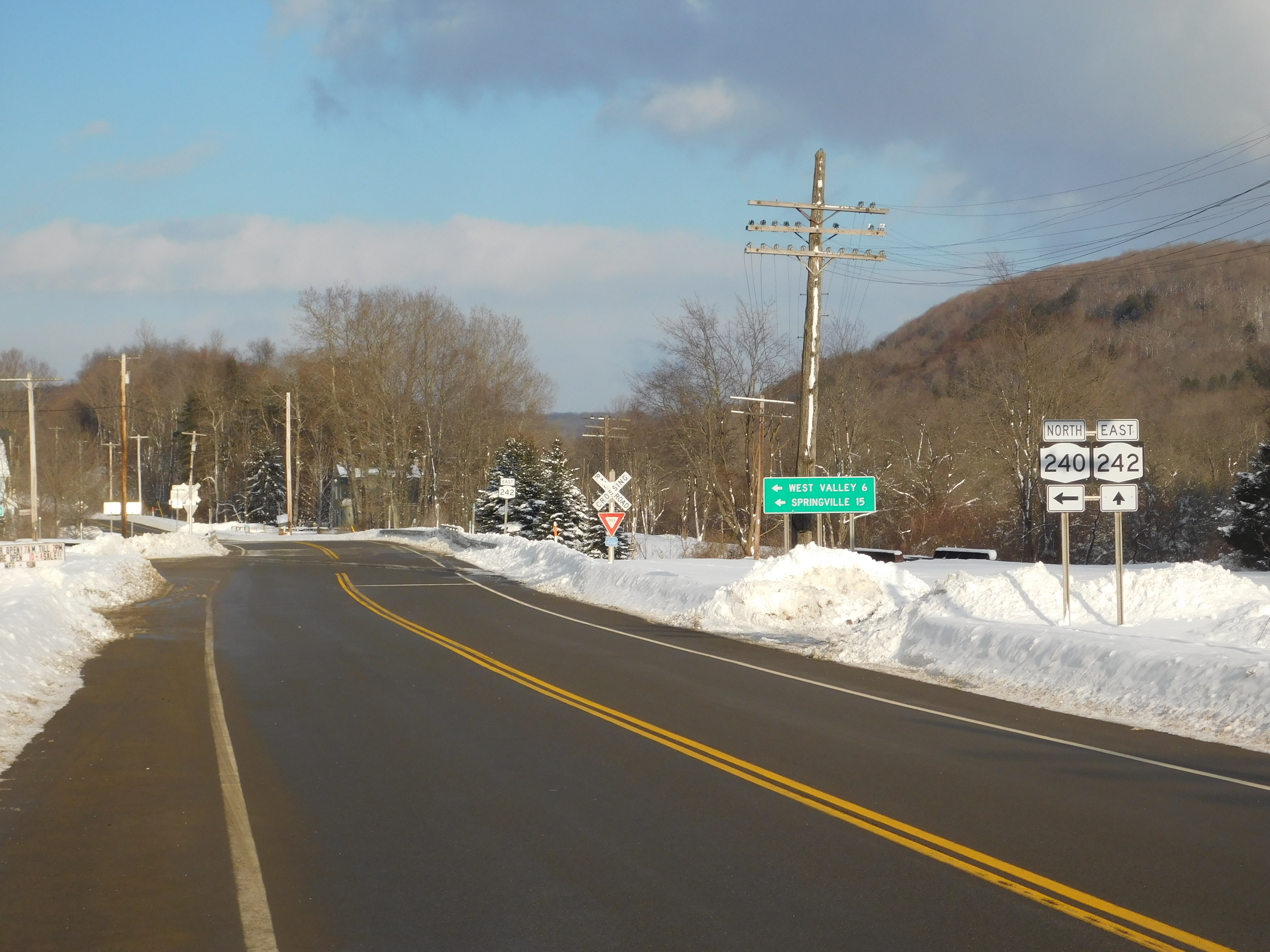
NY 242 eastbound at the junction with NY 240 in Ashford

After Devereaux, NY 242 turns northward and crosses through swampland in Franklinville. Crossing into the hamlet of Bakerstand, the route intersects with the western terminus of CR 17 (Bakerstand Road). After Bakerstand, the route crosses into the town of Machias, leaving the swamp for the hamlet of Bird. After Bird, NY 242 turns northeast near Very Road to an intersection with CR 62 (Maple Avenue). Paralleling the railroad tracks, the route crosses south of the hamlet of Machias, reaching an intersection with NY 16 (Main Street). This junction marks the eastern terminus of NY 242.

== History ==
The portion of NY 242 between Windsor Road in Mansfield and Bryant Hill Road in Ellicottville follows the historic Chautauqua Road, one of the oldest roads in Western New York and one that was commissioned by the Holland Land Company in the 1810s. From Napoli westward, it joined the Jamestown Road, another early pathway that was constructed shortly after the Chautauqua Road. The original path of the Chautauqua Road followed modern-day Windsor, Dublin and Crandall Roads westward, traversing Kahler Hill to meet what is now Buelow Road in Mansfield. The route between Crandall and Buelow Roads proved too steep to traverse and was abandoned and allowed to grow over; by the middle of the 19th century, Chautauqua Road had been rerouted to follow modern-day Whig Street down to the road now known as NY 353 in Elkdale, where it turned north toward Little Valley and rejoined the Jamestown Road.

What is now NY 242 west of Little Valley was originally part of NY 17A, an alternate route of NY 17 between Randolph and Salamanca that was assigned in the mid-1920s. Between Little Valley and Salamanca, NY 17A overlapped with NY 18 on modern NY 353. In the 1930 renumbering of state highways in New York, NY 17A was renumbered to NY 17H while NY 242 was assigned to a new roadway under construction between Little Valley and Ellicottville. The NY 242 designation also continued northeast of Ellicottville to Machias as it does today; however, it initially followed what is now NY 240 and County Route 16 between Ashford and Machias. It was rerouted by the following year to follow its current alignment between Ashford and Machias. The NY 17H designation ceased to exist c. 1937. The former routing of NY 17H west of Little Valley became an extension of NY 242 while the remainder of the route remained part of NY 18.

== Major intersections ==
The entire route is in Cattaraugus County.

Location	mi	km	Destinations	Notes
Coldspring	0.00	0.00	NY 394 – Salamanca, Randolph, Jamestown	Western terminus
Village of Little Valley	9.53	15.34	NY 353 north (Erie Street) – Cattaraugus	Western terminus of NY 242 / NY 353 overlap
Town of Little Valley	10.74	17.28	NY 353 south	Eastern terminus of NY 242 / NY 353 overlap
Village of Ellicottville	17.80	28.65	US 219 south (Jefferson Street) – Salamanca	Western terminus of US 219 / NY 242 overlap
Town of Ellicottville	18.79	30.24	US 219 north – Springville, Buffalo	Eastern terminus of US 219 / NY 242 overlap
Town of Ellicottville	22.46	36.15	NY 240 north / CR 32 north – West Valley, Springville	Hamlet of Ashford Junction; southern terminus of NY 240
Machias	31.96	51.43	NY 16 (Main Street)	Eastern terminus
1.000 mi = 1.609 km; 1.000 km = 0.621 mi: Concurrency terminus
