= New York State Route 353 =

State highway in Cattaraugus County, New York, US

New York State Route 353
- Map of Cattaraugus County and vicinity with NY 353 highlighted in red

Route information
- Maintained by NYSDOT and the city of Salamanca
- Length: 23.97 mi (38.58 km)
- Existed: c. 1933–present

Major junctions
- South end: NY 417 in Salamanca
- North end: US 62 in Dayton

Location
- Country: United States
- State: New York
- Counties: Cattaraugus

Highway system
- New York Highways; Interstate; US; State; Reference; Parkways
← NY 352	→ NY 354

New York State Route 353 (NY 353) is a north–south state highway located within Cattaraugus County, New York, in the United States. It extends for 23.97 miles (38.58 km) from an intersection with NY 417 in the city of Salamanca to a junction with U.S. Route 62 (US 62) in the hamlet of Dayton. In between, the route traverses isolated and undeveloped areas of the county, save for the villages of Little Valley and Cattaraugus. In the latter, NY 353 intersects and briefly overlaps with NY 242.

NY 353 was assigned c. 1933 to a north–south highway connecting Dayton to nearby Perrysburg. At the time, modern NY 353 was part of NY 18, which extended from the Pennsylvania state line to Rochester via Buffalo. NY 18 was cut back to its current western terminus north of Buffalo on January 1, 1962, at which time NY 353 was extended southeastward to Salamanca over NY 18's former routing. The original Dayton–Perryburg segment of NY 353 was transferred to Cattaraugus County in 1980 and is now part of County Route 58 (CR 58).

== Route description ==
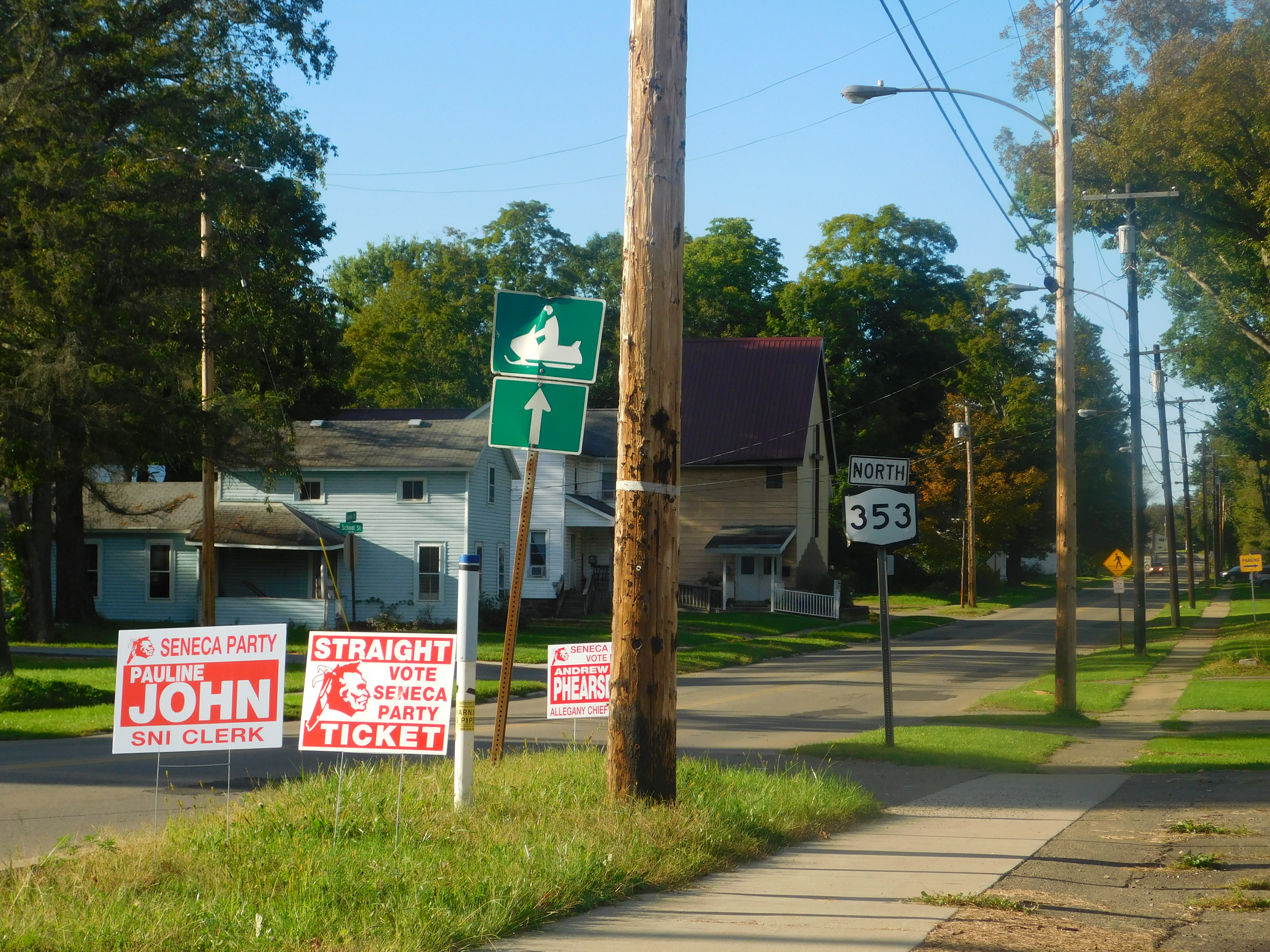
NY 353 northbound in Salamanca

NY 353 begins at an intersection with NY 417 in the western portion of the city of Salamanca. It initially heads northward on the city-maintained Center Street through a commercial section of Salamanca; however, the surroundings become more residential after the route crosses the Allegheny River. The highway exits the city limits shortly afterward, at which point maintenance of the highway shifts to the New York State Department of Transportation (NYSDOT). Now in the surrounding town of Salamanca, NY 353 continues northward on Center Street into a large, mostly undeveloped valley surrounding Little Valley Creek, where the route passes east of Bucktooth Hill and west of Lindell Lookout. The Center Street name ends about 1 mile (1.6 km) north of the city line at a junction with North State Street (CR 94/NY 950B).

Past State Street, NY 353 heads through the valley as an unnamed road, paralleling the former right-of-way of an Erie–Lackawanna rail line (now the Pat McGee Trail) into the town of Little Valley and the small hamlet of Elkdale, where the highway passes a local country club and intersects the North Country Trail. North of Elkdale, the route curves to the northwest, matching a similar turn in the path of the creek valley. This turn brings NY 353 to the outskirts of the village of Little Valley, where it intersects with CR 88 (Baker Road), CR 96 (Killborn Corners) and NY 242 at separate junctions east of the village limits. NY 353 becomes concurrent with the latter, following NY 242 into the village of Little Valley, a stark departure from the sparsely populated areas to the southeast. The concurrent routes, known as Rock City Street, head into the village's central business district, where NY 242 splits off to the southwest.

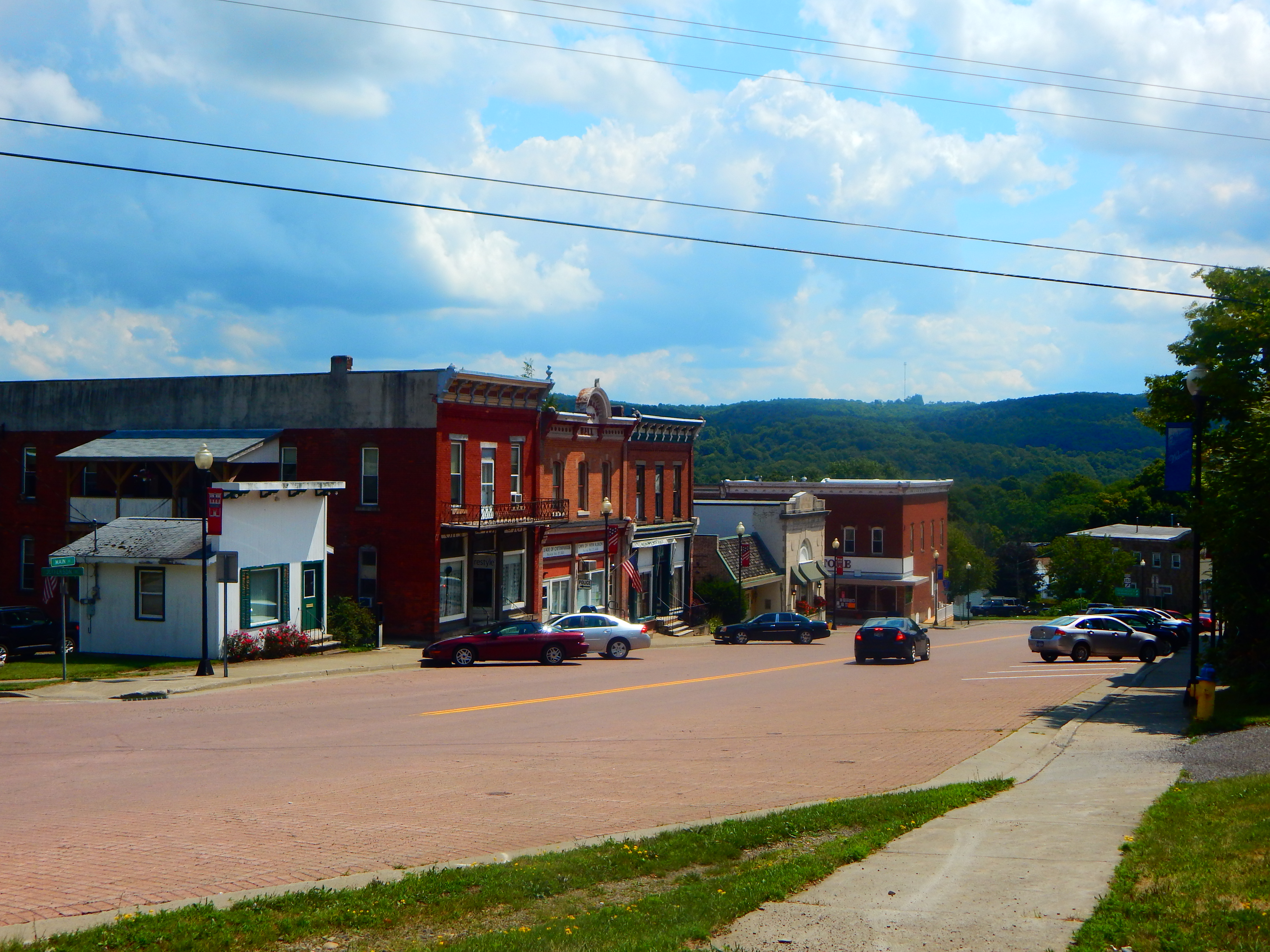
NY 353 through downtown Cattaraugus

North of Little Valley, NY 353 (known as Erie Street from the center of Little Valley to the village line) passes through mostly rural areas as it winds its way northwestward through a mountainous portion of Cattaraugus County. In the route's short distance in Mansfield, it intersects CR 5 (New Albion Road) and CR 14A (Buelow Road) before traveling through several miles of rural New Albion. Just outside the small village of Cattaraugus, NY 353 intersects CR 76 (Lovers Lane Road) and CR 6 (Leon Road). NY 353 becomes Main Street in Cattaraugus, in the middle of which it intersects CR 12, the main highway serving the towns of Otto and East Otto.

From here, the route crosses hilly, largely undeveloped sections of the towns of New Albion and Persia, meeting CR 4 (Broadway Road, the main spur into Gowanda), CR 57 (which heads into the northwest corner of the county into Markhams and Cottage), and the north end of CR 5 to reach the more level town of Dayton. Just west of the Persia–Dayton town line, NY 353 becomes Dayton–Cattaraugus Road and turns due north, paralleling the town line as it crosses a low-lying section of Dayton. After 2.5 miles (4.0 km), the route makes a sharp turn to the northwest, paralleling the New York and Lake Erie Railroad into the hamlet of Dayton, where NY 353 comes to an end at an intersection with US 62.

== History ==
The section of modern NY 353 from the west end of the overlap with NY 242 in Little Valley to Salamanca was originally designated as part of Route 4, an unsigned legislative route, by the New York State Legislature in 1908. When the first set of posted routes in New York were assigned in 1924, this section of legislative Route 4 became part of NY 18, which initially extended south through Salamanca to the Pennsylvania state line and north to Buffalo via Dayton. By 1926, the Salamanca–Little Valley highway was also designated as part of NY 17A, an alternate route of NY 17 between Randolph and Salamanca.

In the 1930 renumbering of state highways in New York, NY 18 was extended northeastward from Buffalo to Rochester while NY 17A was renumbered to NY 17H. The Salamanca–Dayton leg of NY 18 was modified twice in the 1930s. NY 18 initially passed through New Albion on its way from Little Valley to Cattaraugus; however, it was realigned c. 1934 to follow a more direct alignment between Little Valley and Cattaraugus that bypassed New Albion to the east. Meanwhile, the overlap with NY 17H was eliminated c. 1937 when the NY 17H designation was removed and replaced with an extended NY 242 west of Little Valley.

NY 353, meanwhile, was assigned c. 1933 to the portion of Peck Hill Road between US 62 west of the Dayton hamlet of the same name and NY 39 in Perrysburg. When NY 18 was truncated to its current western terminus in Lewiston on January 1, 1962, NY 353 was extended southeast to Salamanca by way of NY 18's former routing and a short overlap with US 62. NY 353 ended at NY 17 in Salamanca. NY 353 remained unchanged until April 1, 1980, when ownership and maintenance of the original Dayton–Perrysburg segment of NY 353 was transferred from the state of New York to Cattaraugus County as part of a highway maintenance swap between the two levels of government. Following the swap, NY 353 was truncated to what had been the eastern terminus of its overlap with US 62 in Dayton. The former routing of NY 353 along Peck Hill Road is now part of CR 58.

Until the 1990s, the Salamanca end of NY 353 split in two directions, with the main route taking a more westerly track into the west end of Salamanca and an eastern route, designated as Reference Route 950B (but marked "TO 353" on the lone road marker), entered Salamanca and merged with city-maintained State Street. In the late 1990s, the northern half of 950B was handed over to the Cattaraugus County Highway Department (which had shared maintenance of that route before then, as Route 94) and the junction restructured. The southern half of NY 950B remains under state maintenance.

== Major intersections ==
The entire route is in Cattaraugus County.

Location	mi	km	Destinations	Notes
City of Salamanca	0.00	0.00	NY 417 to I-86	Southern terminus
Town of Little Valley	6.22	10.01	NY 242 east	Eastern terminus of NY 242 / NY 353 overlap
Village of Little Valley	7.43	11.96	NY 242 west – East Randolph	Western terminus of NY 242 / NY 353 overlap
Dayton	23.97	38.58	US 62 – Gowanda, Buffalo	Northern terminus; hamlet of Dayton
1.000 mi = 1.609 km; 1.000 km = 0.621 mi

== See also ==
- List of county routes in Cattaraugus County, New York
