= Mansfield, New York =

- Town
- Location within New York Location within the United States
- Coordinates: 42°18′36″N 78°45′24″W
- Country: United States
- State: New York
- County: Cattaraugus

Government
  - Type: Town Council
  - Town Supervisor: Robert C. Keis, Sr. (R)
  - Town Council: Members' List: • James A. Hammond (R); • Donald F. Mosher (R); • Nancy R. Meeder (R); • Danny R. Hart (R)

Area
  - Total: 39.66 sq mi (102.71 km^{2})
  - Land: 39.63 sq mi (102.63 km^{2})
  - Water: 0.031 sq mi (0.08 km^{2})
- Elevation: 1,873 ft (571 m)

Population (2020)
  - Total: 843
  - Estimate (2021): 843
  - Density: 20.8/sq mi (8.05/km^{2})
- Time zone: UTC-5 (Eastern (EST))
  - Summer (DST): UTC-4 (EDT)
- ZIP Codes: 14719 (Cattaraugus); 14729 (East Otto); 14731 (Ellicottville); 14741 (Great Valley); 14755 (Little Valley)
- FIPS code: 36-009-45161
- GNIS feature ID: 0979193
- Website: mansfieldny.org

Mansfield is a town in Cattaraugus County, New York, United States. The population was 843 at the 2020 census. The name was thought to be that of a noble family in England.

The town is centrally located in Cattaraugus County, north of Little Valley.

== History ==
The area was first settled circa 1817. The town of Mansfield was formed in 1830 from part of the town of Town of Little Valley. The town was first called "Cecilius". The name "Mansfield" was adopted in 1831.

Mansfield had a post office by 1840. It is implied to still have a post office as late as 1933 but merged with the Little Valley post office some time before the establishment of ZIP Codes in 1963. (Within the 147 prefix, Little Valley and Mansfield are adjacent to each other alphabetically and geographically.) The ZIP Code Tabulation Area for 14755, the ZIP Code for Little Valley, shows a clear 8 shape illustrating the territory each office covered.

== Geography ==
According to the United States Census Bureau, the town has a total area of 40.2 square miles (104.0 km^{2}), of which 40.1 square miles (103.9 km^{2}) is land and 0.04 square miles (0.1 km^{2}), or 0.08%, is water.

The town is primarily served by county roads. Cattaraugus County Route 14 (Toad Hollow Road) runs from south to north through the town, while Cattaraugus County Route 13 (Maples Road) runs west to east in the northern part of the town, and County Route 15 (Dublin Road) runs along the southern part of the town. New York State Route 242 passes across the southeast corner of the town and New York State Route 353 through a small portion of the southwest corner.

Mansfield Creek flows across the north part of the town, and Little Valley Creek crosses the southwest corner. The two creeks follow a similar path in opposite directions, separated by the Saint Lawrence River Divide.

=== Adjacent towns and areas ===
(Clockwise)

- Otto; East Otto
- Ellicottville
- Little Valley
- New Albion

== Demographics ==
Historical population
Census	Pop.	Note	%±
1830	378		—
1840	942		149.2%
1850	1,057		12.2%
1860	1,265		19.7%
1870	1,135		−10.3%
1880	1,106		−2.6%
1890	1,022		−7.6%
1900	968		−5.3%
1910	912		−5.8%
1920	717		−21.4%
1930	661		−7.8%
1940	620		−6.2%
1950	672		8.4%
1960	632		−6.0%
1970	605		−4.3%
1980	784		29.6%
1990	724		−7.7%
2000	800		10.5%
2010	808		1.0%
2020	843		4.3%
2021 (est.)	843		0.0%
U.S. Decennial Census

As of the census of 2000, there were 800 people, 305 households, and 234 families residing in the town. The population density was 20.2 inhabitants per square mile (7.8/km^{2}). There were 540 housing units at an average density of 13.6 per square mile (5.3/km^{2}). The racial makeup of the town was 98.88% White, 0.12% (one person) African American, 0.75% (six people) Native American, 0.12% (one person) Asian, and 0.12% (one person) from two or more races. Four of the town's residents were Hispanic or Latino of any race, 0.25% of the population.

There were 305 households, out of which 33.8% had children under the age of 18 living with them, 64.3% were married couples living together, 6.6% had a female householder with no husband present, and 23.0% were non-families. 19.3% of all households were made up of individuals, and 6.9% had someone living alone who was 65 years of age or older. The average household size was 2.61 and the average family size was 3.00.

In the town, the population was spread out, with 27.9% under the age of 18, 6.3% from 18 to 24, 27.8% from 25 to 44, 27.4% from 45 to 64, and 10.8% who were 65 years of age or older. The median age was 38 years. For every 100 females, there were 108.3 males. For every 100 females age 18 and over, there were 103.9 males.

The median income for a household in the town was $36,420, and the median income for a family was $37,500. Males had a median income of $27,614 versus $24,750 for females. The per capita income for the town was $21,700. About 6.3% of families and 8.0% of the population were below the poverty line, including 7.8% of those under age 18 and 2.4% of those age 65 or over.

Much of Mansfield north of Five Points is agricultural land, with several farms (some of them Amish) in the area.

== Notable people ==
- Anna Maynard Barbour, best-selling fiction author
- Owen Vincent Coffin, 56th governor of Connecticut

== Communities and locations in Mansfield ==
- Dobbins Memorial State Forest – a state forest in the southern part of the town.
- Eddyville – a hamlet in the north part of the town on County Road 14. The Mansfield town hall is in Eddyville, as is the town's only currently operating church, the nondenominational Solomon's Porch Ministries. Eddyville was also the site of the town's post office during its existence before it was closed some time in the early 20th century. Eddyville has an estimated population of 55 as of 2021.
- Eddyville Corners – The spot where County Roads 13 and 14 converge, north of Eddyville and west of Maples. A now-abandoned Baptist church (whose congregation has since relocated to Little Valley) is at this spot, as is a state-operated fish stocking outlet on Mansfield Creek.
- Five Points – A location southwest of Eddyville near the town center on County Road 14. Five Points is the location of a county-operated landfill.
- Maples – A hamlet east of Eddyville on County Road 13. The Mansfield fire department and highway barns are in Maples. Maples has an estimated population of 60.
- Orlando – A mostly unpopulated hamlet near the east town line on County Road 13.
