= William Buffington Jr. =

American politician

Member of the New York State Assembly from the 2nd district
- In office 1858–1859
- Preceded by: Rufus Crowley
- Succeeded by: James M. Smith

Personal details
- Born: May 31, 1817 Cambridge, New York, U.S.
- Died: January 21, 1881 (aged 63)

William Buffington Jr. (May 31, 1817 – January 21, 1881) was an American farmer, hotel keeper, and politician from New York.

== Life ==
Buffington was born on May 31, 1817, in Cambridge, New York, the son of William Buffington Sr. and Harriet Churchill.

Buffington moved to Marcellus with his family in 1818, and then to New Albion in 1826. He attended common schools in the latter place and spent a few months in a high school in what later became Gowanda. He was elected inspector of schools while still relatively young and later became elected town superintendent of schools for five consecutive terms. He began working as a farmer when he was twenty. When the New York and Erie Railroad was established, he built and ran a hotel in the village of Cattaraugus.

Buffington represented New Albion as town supervisor in 1849, 1850, and 1857. He was originally a Whig, and his first vote was for William H. Seward for governor in 1838. In 1854, he was the sole delegate from his assembly district to the convention in Saratoga Springs that formed the Republican Party in New York. In 1857, he was elected to the New York State Assembly as a Republican, representing the Cattaraugus County 2nd District. He served in the Assembly in 1858 and 1859. In 1861, after Abraham Lincoln became president, he was appointed mail agent on the route from Dunkirk to New York City over the Erie Railroad. He served in that office for several years, resigning in favor of his son Henry C. He later owned and occupied a farm in Elm Creek, near East Randolph.

Buffington was active in the temperance movement, serving in various temperance organizations for decades and frequently giving addresses on the subject. He was a member of the Baptist church. In 1850, he married Eleanor Ballard. Their children were Francis S., Henry C., Mary C., George H., Ava V., and Morand D. P.

Buffington died at home on January 21, 1881.

New York State Assembly
| Preceded by Rufus Crowley | New York State Assembly; Cattaraugus County, 2nd District; 1858–1859 | Succeeded by James M. Smith |
