= East Otto, New York =

- Town
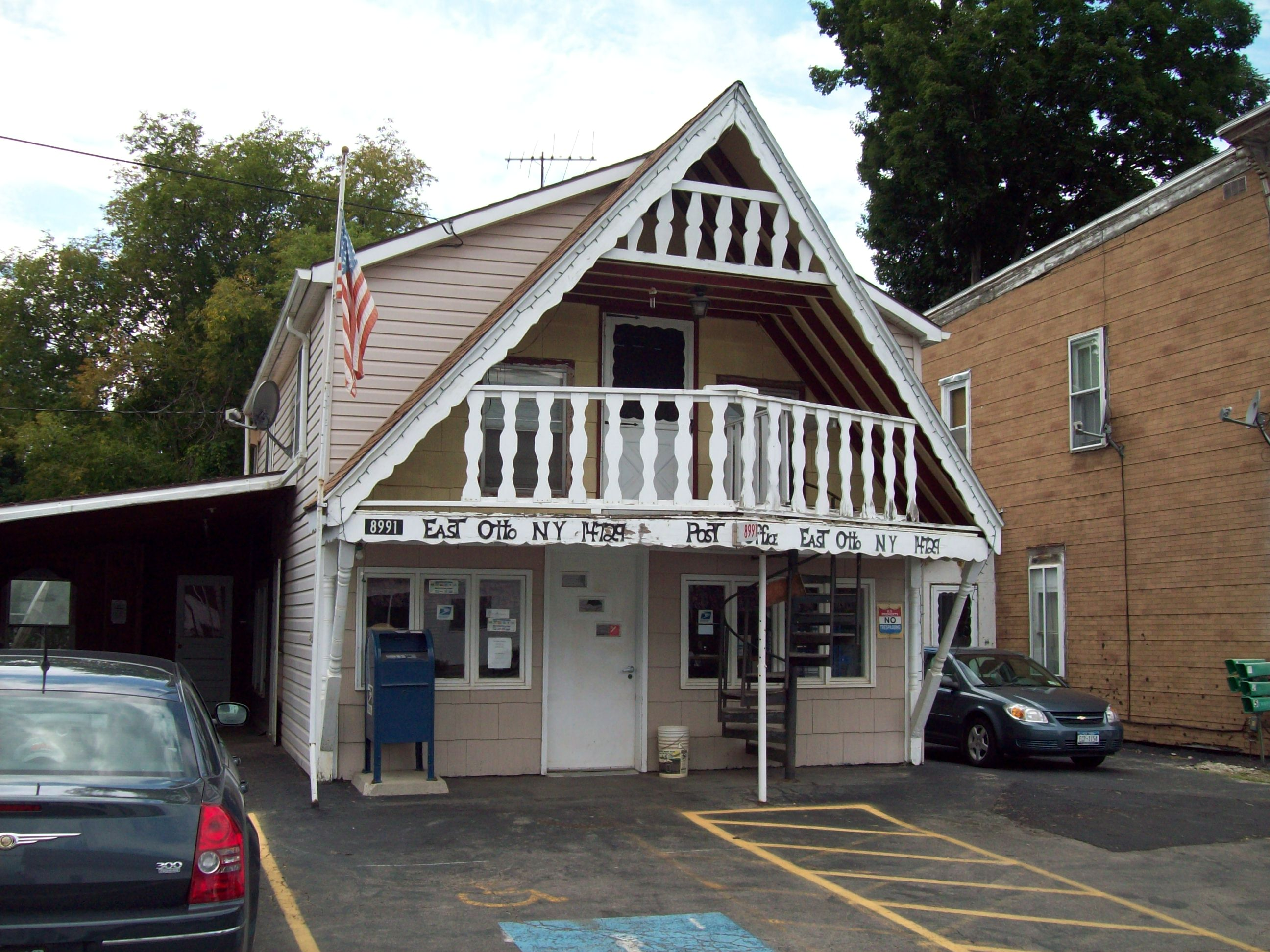
- East Otto Post Office, August 2010

- Location within New York Location within the United States
- Coordinates: 42°23′19″N 78°44′28″W
- Country: United States
- State: New York
- County: Cattaraugus

Government
  - Type: Town Council
  - Town Supervisor: James A. Beach (R)
  - Town Council: Members' List: • David Forster (R); • Richard Grey, Jr. (R); • Michael Poch (R); • William Spors (R)

Area
  - Total: 41.46 sq mi (107.39 km^{2})
  - Land: 41.14 sq mi (106.54 km^{2})
  - Water: 0.32 sq mi (0.84 km^{2})
- Elevation: 1,522 ft (464 m)

Population (2020)
  - Total: 977
  - Estimate (2021): 971
  - Density: 25.5/sq mi (9.86/km^{2})
- Time zone: UTC-5 (Eastern (EST))
  - Summer (DST): UTC-4 (EDT)
- ZIP Codes: 14729 (East Otto); 14171 (West Valley); 14719 (Cattaraugus)
- Area code: 716
- FIPS code: 36-009-22678
- GNIS feature ID: 0978921
- Website: www.townofeastotto.gov

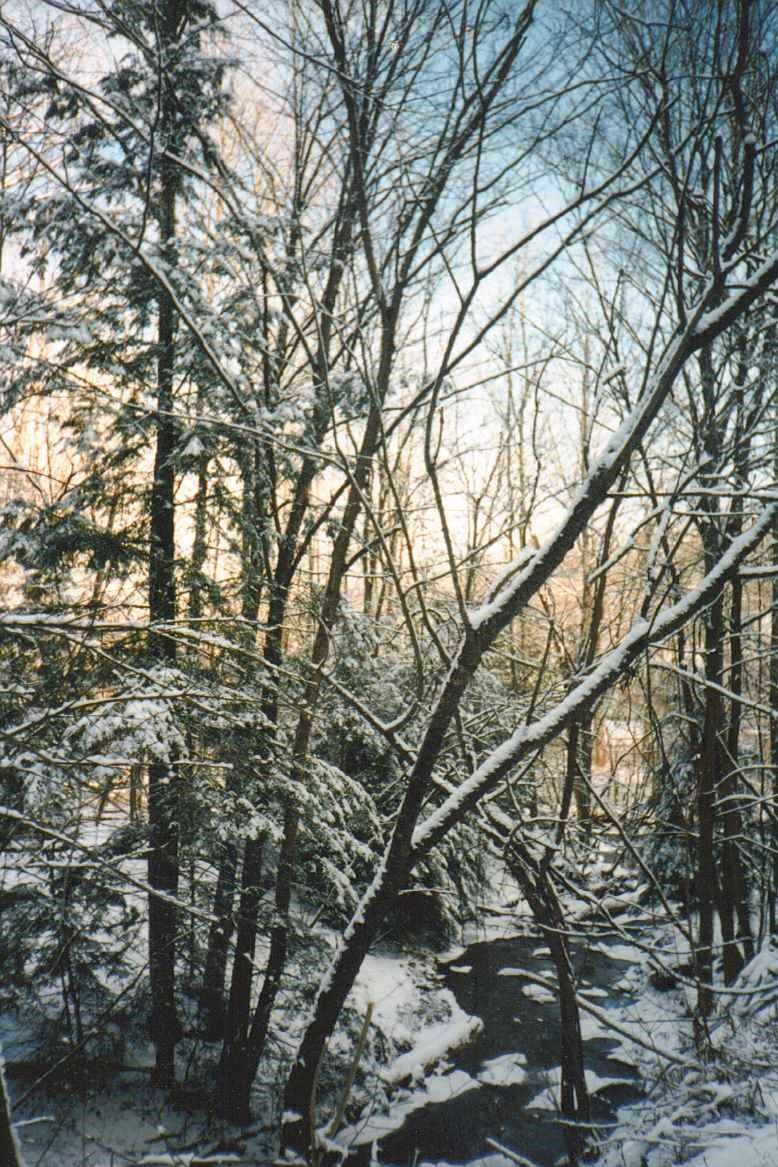
Winter scene in East Otto, January 1998

East Otto is a town in Cattaraugus County, New York, United States. The population was 977 at the 2020 census. The town, along with neighboring Otto, is named after an agent of the Holland Land Company, Jacob Otto. The town of East Otto is on the northern border of the county.

== History ==
The town of East Otto was founded in 1854. As its name implies, the town was formed from the eastern half of the town of Otto, which at the time covered most of the north-central portion of the county. East Otto was one of the last towns to be formed in Cattaraugus County.

The East Otto Union School, which was constructed in 1920 and now serves as a town hall, is listed on the National Register of Historic Places.

== Geography ==
According to the United States Census Bureau, the town has a total area of 40.4 square miles (104.6 km^{2}), of which 40.1 square miles (103.8 km^{2}) is land and 0.31 square miles (0.8 km^{2}), or 0.81%, is water.

The north town line is marked by Cattaraugus Creek and is the border of Erie County.

Cattaraugus County Route 12 is the primary highway through the area, heading westward toward Otto and northward to U.S. Route 219 in Ashford. Cattaraugus County Route 14 (Reed Hill Road) heads southward toward Little Valley, while Cattaraugus County Route 75 (Plato Road) travels east/southeast to US 219 along a more southerly route. Routes 12, 14, and 75 converge at the hamlet of East Otto.

== Demographics ==
Historical population
Census	Pop.	Note	%±
1860	1,300		—
1870	1,164		−10.5%
1880	1,251		7.5%
1890	1,288		3.0%
1900	1,138		−11.6%
1910	1,093		−4.0%
1920	915		−16.3%
1930	751		−17.9%
1940	732		−2.5%
1950	743		1.5%
1960	701		−5.7%
1970	910		29.8%
1980	942		3.5%
1990	1,003		6.5%
2000	1,105		10.2%
2010	1,062		−3.9%
2020	977		−8.0%
2021 (est.)	971		−0.6%
U.S. Decennial Census

As of the census of 2000, there were 1,105 people, 412 households, and 285 families residing in the town. The population density was 26.8 inhabitants per square mile (10.3/km^{2}). There were 545 housing units at an average density of 13.2 per square mile (5.1/km^{2}). The racial makeup of the town was 98.37% White, 0.45% African American, 0.09% Native American, 0.27% Asian, 0.36% from other races, and 0.45% from two or more races. Hispanic or Latino of any race were 0.72% of the population.

There were 412 households, out of which 34.7% had children under the age of 18 living with them, 58.3% were married couples living together, 7.0% had a female householder with no husband present, and 30.8% were non-families. 21.1% of all households were made up of individuals, and 6.1% had someone living alone who was 65 years of age or older. The average household size was 2.68 and the average family size was 3.14.

In the town, the population was spread out, with 27.2% under the age of 18, 7.6% from 18 to 24, 30.7% from 25 to 44, 24.2% from 45 to 64, and 10.3% who were 65 years of age or older. The median age was 37 years. For every 100 females, there were 106.9 males. For every 100 females age 18 and over, there were 108.3 males.

The median income for a household in the town was $36,250, and the median income for a family was $42,917. Males had a median income of $31,917 versus $20,795 for females. The per capita income for the town was $15,607. About 10.2% of families and 12.2% of the population were below the poverty line, including 15.2% of those under age 18 and 12.0% of those age 65 or over.

== Communities and locations in East Otto ==
- Allegany Mountain Resort at Rainbow Lake – A seasonal community and campground in the southeast part of the town.
- Brooklyn – A hamlet on Route 12 in the north-central part of the town, and north of East Otto village.
- East Otto – The hamlet of East Otto at the junction of County Roads 12, 14, and 75 is in the south-central part of the town on East Otto Creek.
- Edies Siding – A hamlet in the northeast corner of the town by Cattaraugus Creek.
- Griffis Sculpture Park – An outdoor sculpture park on Mill Valley Road.
- Plato – A hamlet at the south town line.
- Whiteford Hollow – A hamlet southeast of Brooklyn.

== Adjacent towns and areas ==
Griffis Sculpture Park

(Clockwise)

- Collins; Concord
- Ashford; Ellicottville
- Mansfield
- Otto

== Notable people ==
- Benjamin F. Rice, former US senator from Arkansas
- Gilbert A. Pierce, eighth governor of Dakota Territory
