= Anna Maynard Barbour =

American author

Anna Maynard Barbour (died May 10, 1941) was an American author of best-selling fiction. A 1903 article in The Atlantic Monthly stated that "A. Maynard Barbour has been generally hailed as the most successful of American writers of mystery."

== Biography ==
Anna Barbour was born in Mansfield, New York, in the 19th century to Fayette Barbour and Jane E. Cutler. Her parents died when she was young. During the late 19th century, she lived in Helena, Montana, where she worked for the U. S. Government. She married an English gentleman in 1893, and her husband reportedly encouraged her writing career. In 1907 she became an Episcopal deaconess at the House of Mercy in Boston and subsequently worked in Boston and Tennessee.

== Works ==
- The Award of Justice; Or, Told in the Rockies: A Pen Picture of the West (1897)
- That Mainwaring Affair (1900)
- The award of justice (1901)
- At the Time Appointed (1903)
- Breakers Ahead (1906)
