= Joel H. Lyman =

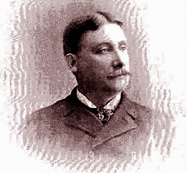
- Born: May 11, 1845; Cattaraugus, New York
- Died: May 4, 1922 (aged 76); Randolph, New York
- Military career
- Allegiance: United States of America; Union
- Branch: United States Army; Union Army
- Service years: 1861 - 1864
- Rank: Quartermaster Sergeant
- Unit: (New York (state)) 9th New York Cavalry
- Conflicts: American Civil War
- Awards: Medal of Honor

Joel H. Lyman (May 11, 1845 – May 4, 1922) was a Quartermaster sergeant in the Union Army and a Medal of Honor recipient for his actions in the American Civil War.

Lyman enlisted in the Army from East Randolph, New York in October 1861. He was wounded at the Third Battle of Winchester, and mustered out the next month. Lyman died on May 4, 1922. He is buried in Randolph Cemetery, New York.

US Medal Of Honor - 1862, that he received

== Medal of Honor ==
Rank and organization: Quartermaster Sergeant, Company B, 9th New York Cavalry. Place and date: At Winchester, Va., September 19, 1864. Entered service at: East Randolph, N.Y. Birth: Cattaraugus, N.Y. Date of issue: August 20, 1894.

Citation:

In an attempt to capture a Confederate flag he captured one of the enemy's officers and brought him within the lines.

== See also ==
- List of Medal of Honor recipients
- List of American Civil War Medal of Honor recipients: G–L
