= New Albion, New York =

- Town
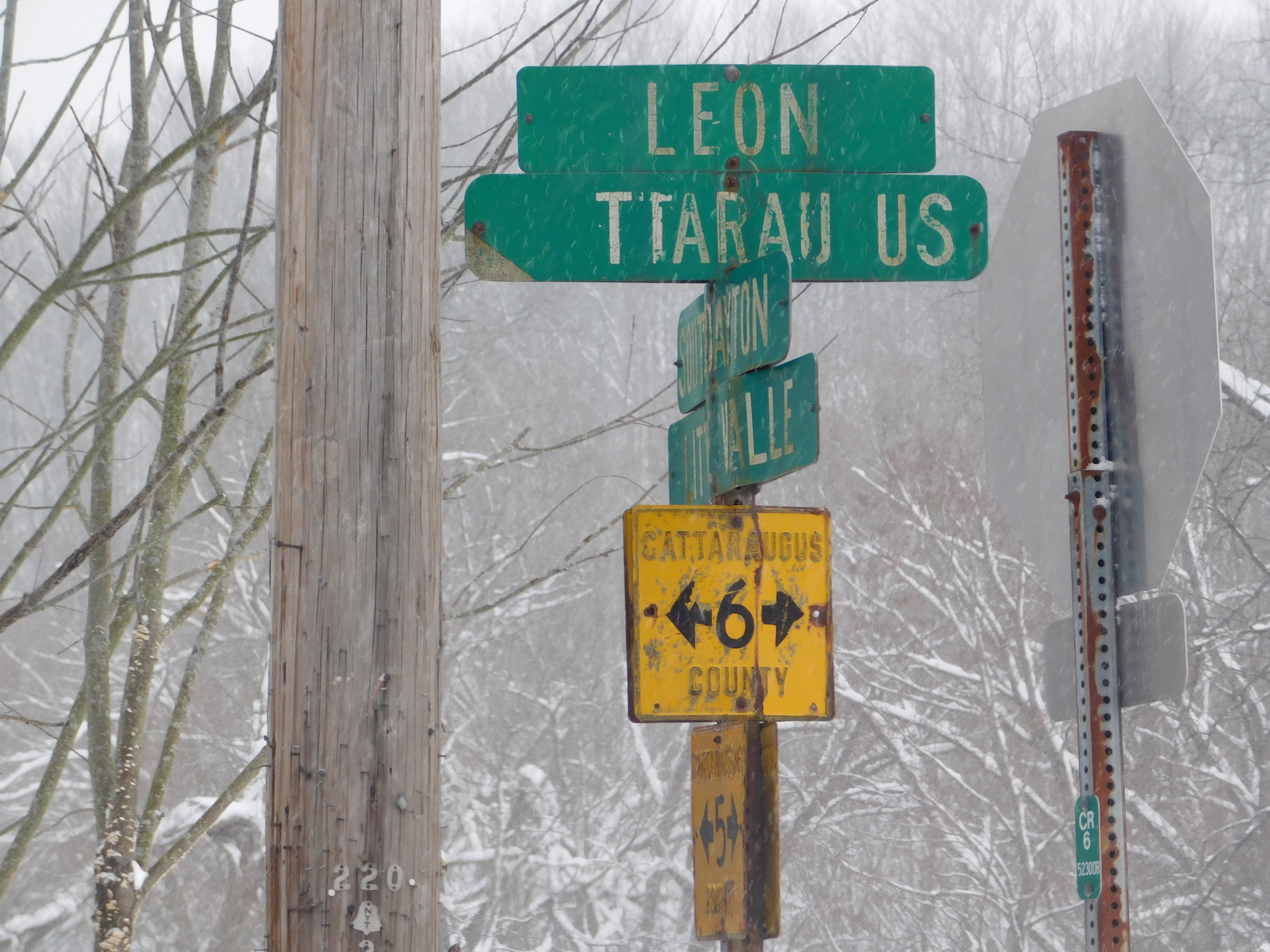
- Signpost marking the hamlet of New Albion

- Location within New York Location within the United States
- Coordinates: 42°18′47″N 78°52′18″W
- Country: United States
- State: New York
- County: Cattaraugus

Government
  - Type: Town Council
  - Town Supervisor: Lloyd J. Chilson (R)
  - Town Council: Members' List: • Marilyn A. Wasmund (D, R); • Patrick F. Erhart (R); • Eric W. Pritchard (R); • Michael R. Weishan (R)

Area
  - Total: 36.32 sq mi (94.08 km^{2})
  - Land: 36.13 sq mi (93.57 km^{2})
  - Water: 0.19 sq mi (0.50 km^{2})
- Elevation: 1,801 ft (549 m)

Population (2020)
  - Total: 1,990
  - Estimate (2021): 1,974
  - Density: 52.7/sq mi (20.34/km^{2})
- Time zone: UTC-5 (EST)
  - Summer (DST): UTC-4 (EDT)
- ZIP Codes: 14719 (Cattaraugus); 14755 (Little Valley)
- FIPS code: 36-009-49880
- GNIS feature ID: 0979253
- Website: www.newalbionny.gov

New Albion is a town in Cattaraugus County, New York, United States. The population was 1,990 at the 2020 census. The town is named after Albion in Orleans County, the source of some early settlers. New Albion is in the northwest quadrant of the county, northwest of the city of Salamanca. The Village of Cattaraugus is in the northeast part of town.

== History ==
From approximately the 1640s, the area was in the domain of the Seneca tribe and was first settled by outsiders around 1818. The town of New Albion was established in 1830 from part of the town of Little Valley. The oldest business community in the town was New Albion with its first store opening in 1833. (New Albion, while maintaining a cluster of residences, no longer has any businesses.) Later the village of Cattaraugus surpassed New Albion.

"New Albion" is also a name that was once applied to the west coast of North America.

== Geography ==
According to the United States Census Bureau, the town has a total area of 35.8 square miles (92.8 km^{2}), of which 35.6 square miles (92.3 km^{2}) is land and 0.19 square miles (0.5 km^{2}), or 0.54%, is water.

New York State Route 353 is an important north-south highway in the town, as is Cattaraugus County Route 5, which parallels Route 353 to the southwest. County Route 6 enters the town from the west, while County Route 12 enters from the northeast and County Route 10 enters from the south. County Route 76 (Lovers Lane Road) bypasses the village of Cattaraugus en route to Otto, but unstable ground makes that road unsuitable as a major thoroughfare.

Conewango Creek, a tributary of the Allegheny River and part of the Mississippi River watershed, flows out of the west part of the town, and the south branch of Cattaraugus Creek, which flows to Lake Erie and is part of the St. Lawrence River watershed, originates in the town.

=== Adjacent towns and areas ===
The towns of Persia and Otto lie to the north. New Albion forms its border on the east with the town of Mansfield and on the west with the town of Leon. To the south is the town of Napoli.

== Demographics ==
Historical population
Census	Pop.	Note	%±
1830	380		—
1840	1,016		167.4%
1850	1,633		60.7%
1860	1,579		−3.3%
1870	1,487		−5.8%
1880	1,732		16.5%
1890	1,858		7.3%
1900	2,372		27.7%
1910	1,989		−16.1%
1920	2,053		3.2%
1930	2,004		−2.4%
1940	1,747		−12.8%
1950	1,894		8.4%
1960	1,981		4.6%
1970	1,988		0.4%
1980	2,156		8.5%
1990	1,978		−8.3%
2000	2,068		4.6%
2010	1,972		−4.6%
2020	1,990		0.9%
2021 (est.)	1,974		−0.8%
U.S. Decennial Census

As of the census of 2000, there were 2,068 people, 808 households, and 547 families residing in the town. The population density was 56.9 inhabitants per square mile (22.0/km^{2}). There were 1,005 housing units at an average density of 27.6 per square mile (10.7/km^{2}). The racial makeup of the town was 98.74% White, 0.15% African American, 0.53% Native American, 0.19% from other races, and 0.39% from two or more races. Hispanic or Latino of any race were 1.35% of the population.

There were 808 households, out of which 34.7% had children under the age of 18 living with them, 53.3% were married couples living together, 8.8% had a female householder with no husband present, and 32.2% were non-families. 26.6% of all households were made up of individuals, and 11.5% had someone living alone who was 65 years of age or older. The average household size was 2.55 and the average family size was 3.09.

In the town, the population was spread out, with 28.4% under the age of 18, 6.7% from 18 to 24, 26.5% from 25 to 44, 24.3% from 45 to 64, and 14.1% who were 65 years of age or older. The median age was 37 years. For every 100 females, there were 100.6 males. For every 100 females age 18 and over, there were 97.7 males.

The median income for a household in the town was $32,917, and the median income for a family was $38,468. Males had a median income of $30,494 versus $24,554 for females. The per capita income for the town was $15,841. About 7.0% of families and 10.3% of the population were below the poverty line, including 14.4% of those under age 18 and 9.5% of those age 65 or over.

== Notable people ==
- William Buffington Jr., former member of the New York State Assembly
- John P. Darling, former New York state senator
- Horace C. Young, former New York state Senator
- H. Olin Young, former US congressman from Michigan

== Communities and locations in New Albion ==
- Anybodys – A former rail station south of Cattaraugus, where the Pat McGee Trail meets County Road 6 at the trail's northern end.
- Champlain Corners – A hamlet at the junction of County Roads 5 and 7 in the southeast corner of the town.
- Guys Settlement – Located at the intersection of County Route 10 and the historic Chautauqua Road, Guys Settlement was one of the first settlements in Cattaraugus County. Located near the settlement is Triple D Rodeo Ranch (after Dechow, Delahoy and Darrell, the ranch's founders), a locally owned rodeo grounds that hosts live monthly events during the summer and autumn.
- Cattaraugus – The village of Cattaraugus is located in the northeast part of the town on NY Route 353.
- Linlyco Lake – An artificial lake and residential community in the southeast corner of the town.
- New Albion – The hamlet of New Albion is southwest of Cattaraugus village by the junction of County Roads 5 and 6. It was first called "Horth's Corners" after the name of the first businessman to open his store.
- New Albion Lake – A small artificial lake northwest of New Albion and south of County Road 5 (Mosher Hollow Road). Connected to the Conewango Creek watershed, it was created in 1982 for the purpose of flood protection and is stocked annually with fish by the state Department of Environmental Conservation and is open for fishing.
