= Cattaraugus Village Commercial Historic District =

Historic district in New York, United States

- U.S. National Register of Historic Places
- U.S. Historic district
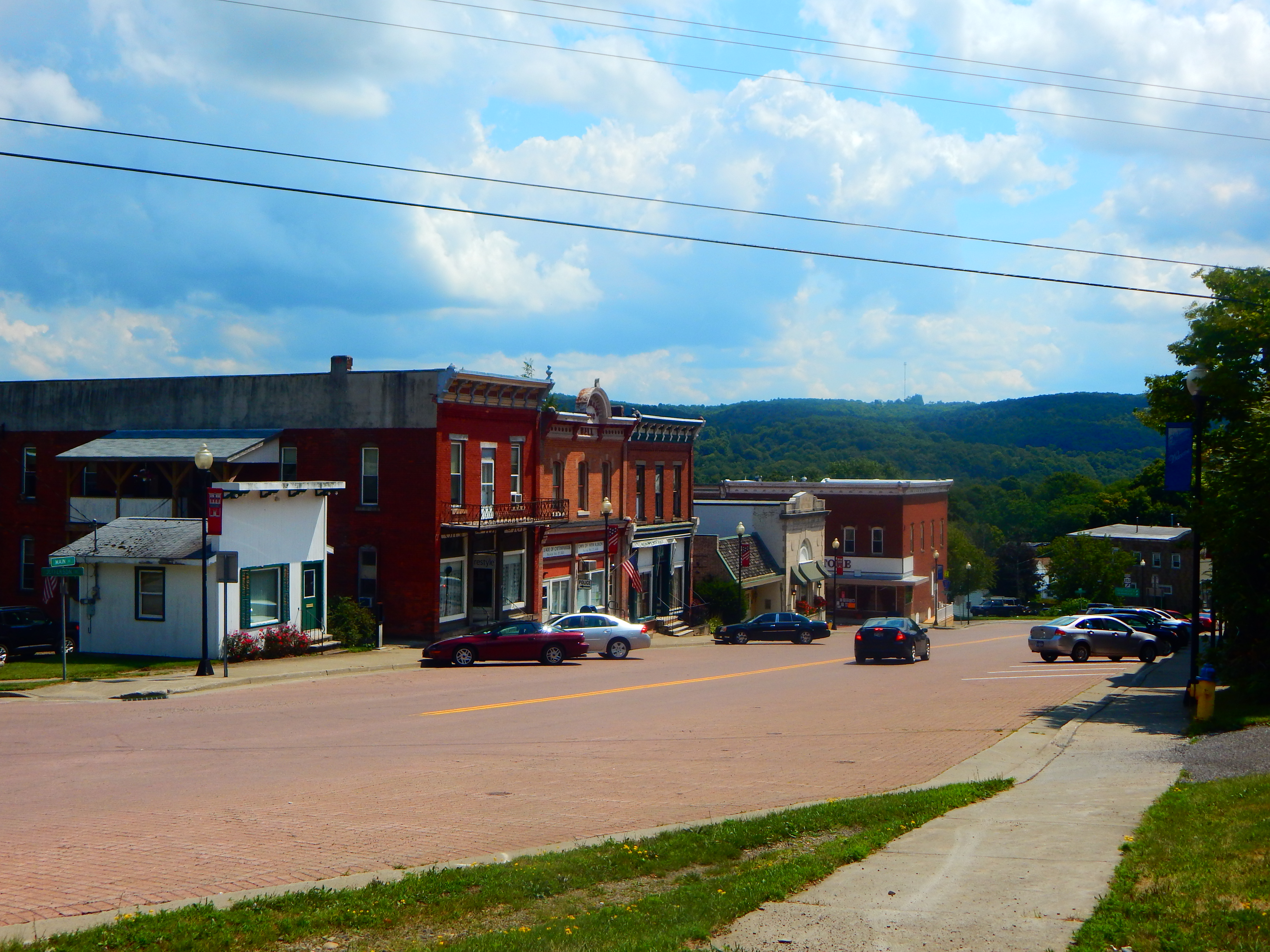
- Route 353 in Cattaraugus, August 2015

- Location within New York Location within the United States
- Location: 9-52 Main, 1-17 Washington, 14 Waverly Sts., Cattaraugus, New York
- Coordinates: 42°19′47″N 78°52′04″W
- Area: 3.23 acres (1.31 ha)
- Built: c. 1880-1920
- Architectural style: Italianate, Queen Anne, Romanesque Revival, Classical Revival, Second Empire
- NRHP reference No.: 13001113
- Added to NRHP: January 15, 2014

Cattaraugus Village Commercial Historic District is a national historic district located at Cattaraugus in Cattaraugus County, New York. The district encompasses 19 contributing buildings in the central business district of Cattaraugus. The district developed between about 1880 and 1920, and includes buildings in a variety of architectural styles including Italianate, Queen Anne, Romanesque Revival, Classical Revival, and Second Empire. Notable buildings include the American Cutlery Museum building (1888), Clayton Rich Building (1890), former Bank of Cattaraugus (1882), Crawford House (c. 1891), and Hook and Ladder Building (1892).

It was listed on the National Register of Historic Places in 2014.
