= Persia, New York =

- Town
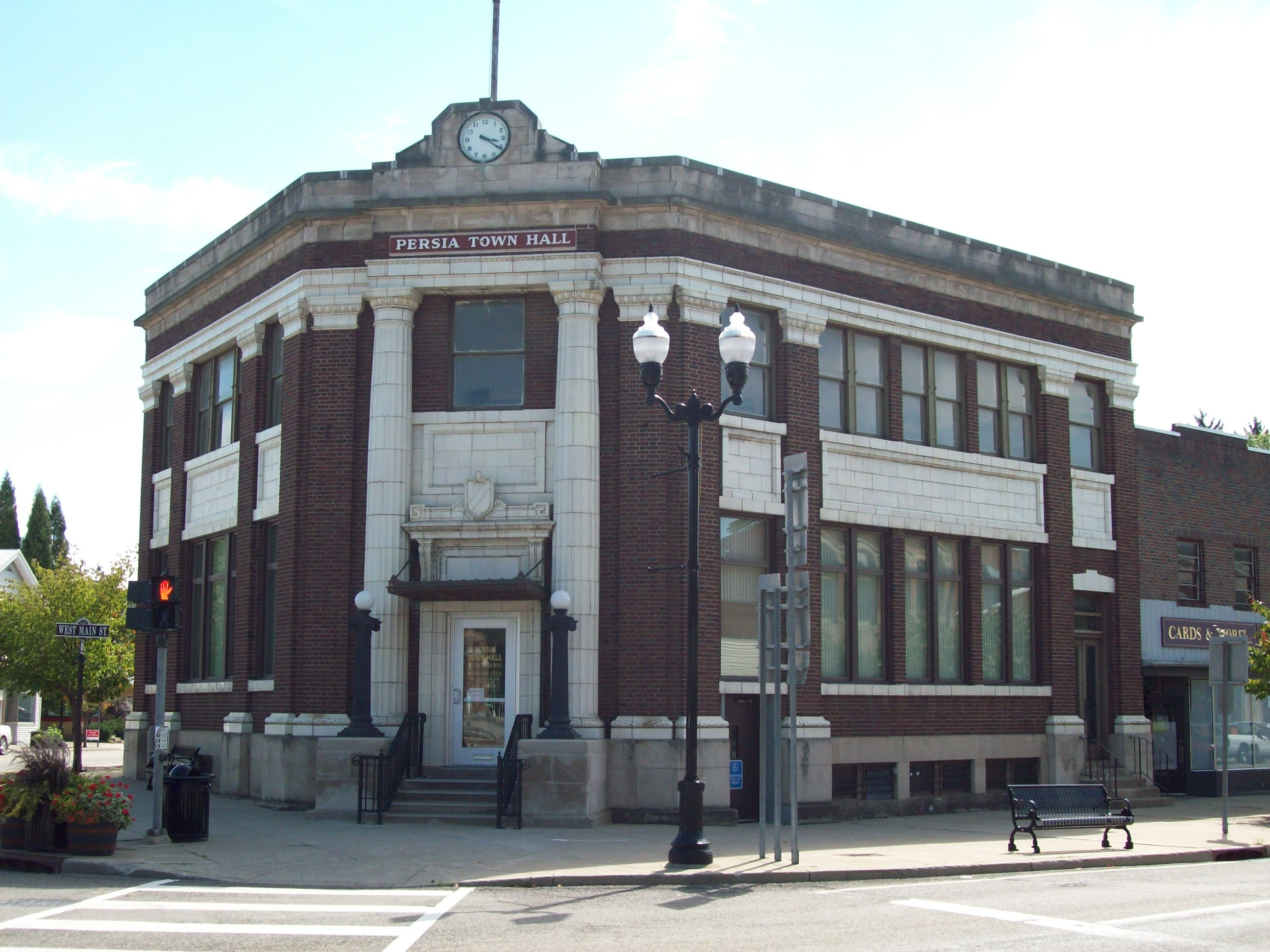
- Persia's town hall

- Location within New York Location within the United States
- Coordinates: 42°26′5″N 78°56′33″W
- Country: United States
- State: New York
- County: Cattaraugus

Government
  - Type: Town Council
  - Town Supervisor: John T. Walgus (R)
  - Town Council: Members' List: • Robert O Dingman Jr (R); • Theresa Girome (R); • Gloria J. Tomaszewski (D)

Area
  - Total: 20.99 sq mi (54.36 km^{2})
  - Land: 20.89 sq mi (54.11 km^{2})
  - Water: 0.097 sq mi (0.25 km^{2})
- Elevation: 1,339 ft (408 m)

Population (2020)
  - Total: 2,207
  - Estimate (2021): 2,181
  - Density: 110.9/sq mi (42.82/km^{2})
- Time zone: UTC-5 (Eastern (EST))
  - Summer (DST): UTC-4 (EDT)
- ZIP Codes: 14070 (Gowanda); 14719 (Cattaraugus)
- FIPS code: 36-009-57331
- GNIS feature ID: 0979356
- Website: www.townofpersiany.gov

Persia is a town in Cattaraugus County, New York, United States. The population was 2,203 at the 2020 census. It is in the northwest part of the county. The village of Gowanda is partially in the town.

== Name ==
The town is named after the kingdom of Persia, though the basis for this choice is unclear. Newspaper archives and history books "do not give even a small clue to the origin of the oriental name." However, it may follow an early trend of naming locations around Gowanda after ancient places, as seen with Bagdad and Zoar.

== History ==
The area that would become the town was first settled in 1810. The town of Persia was founded in 1835 from the town of Perrysburg.

== Geography ==
According to the United States Census Bureau, the town has a total area of 21.0 square miles (54.4 km^{2}), of which 20.9 square miles (54.1 km^{2}) is land and 0.12 square miles (0.3 km^{2}), or 0.46%, is water.

The northern border of the town is partly formed by Cattaraugus Creek, with Erie County on the opposite bank, and the east town line is defined by the South Branch of Cattaraugus Creek.

U.S. Route 62 passes through the northwest corner of the town, and New York State Route 353 passes across the south part of the town. Much of the town is served by the north-to-south Broadway Road (County Road 4), which runs from NY 353 into the village of Gowanda, which occupies the northern tip of the town and extends across Cattaraugus Creek into the town of Collins in Erie County.

=== Adjacent towns and areas ===
(Clockwise)

- Collins
- Otto
- New Albion
- Dayton; Perrysburg

== Demographics ==
Historical population
Census	Pop.	Note	%±
1840	892		—
1850	1,954		119.1%
1860	1,304		−33.3%
1870	1,220		−6.4%
1880	1,370		12.3%
1890	1,506		9.9%
1900	1,940		28.8%
1910	1,730		−10.8%
1920	2,194		26.8%
1930	2,510		14.4%
1940	2,671		6.4%
1950	2,615		−2.1%
1960	2,756		5.4%
1970	2,587		−6.1%
1980	2,442		−5.6%
1990	2,530		3.6%
2000	2,512		−0.7%
2010	2,404		−4.3%
2020	2,207		−8.2%
2021 (est.)	2,181		−1.2%
U.S. Decennial Census

As of the census of 2000 for Persia, there were 2,512 people, 961 households, and 602 families residing in the town. The population density was 120.0 inhabitants per square mile (46.3/km^{2}). There were 1,071 housing units at an average density of 51.2 per square mile (19.8/km^{2}). The racial makeup of the town was 95.74% White, 0.28% African American, 2.51% Native American, 0.36% Asian, 0.04% from other races, and 1.07% from two or more races. Hispanic or Latino of any race were 0.88% of the population.

There were 961 households, out of which 29.7% had children under the age of 18 living with them, 46.2% were married couples living together, 11.9% had a female householder with no husband present, and 37.3% were non-families. 31.3% of all households were made up of individuals, and 15.2% had someone living alone who was 65 years of age or older. The average household size was 2.41 and the average family size was 3.03.

In the town, the population was spread out, with 24.8% under the age of 18, 6.5% from 18 to 24, 26.0% from 25 to 44, 20.2% from 45 to 64, and 22.4% who were 65 years of age or older. The median age was 40 years. For every 100 females, there were 88.4 males. For every 100 females age 18 and over, there were 84.0 males.

The median income for a household in the town was $33,675, and the median income for a family was $39,650. Males had a median income of $29,838 versus $26,304 for females. The per capita income for the town was $15,590. About 10.6% of families and 13.1% of the population were below the poverty line, including 18.6% of those under age 18 and 11.1% of those age 65 or over.

Population in 2010
Age	Enumeration and percentage
Under 5 years	130 5.4%
5 to 9 years	150 6.2%
10 to 14 years	163 6.8%
15 to 19 years	160 6.7%
20 to 24 years	120 5.0%
25 to 29 years	136 5.7%
30 to 34 years	113 4.7%
35 to 39 years	141 5.9%
40 to 44 years	161 6.7%
45 to 49 years	182 7.6%
50 to 54 years	201 8.4%
55 to 59 years	155 6.4%
60 to 64 years	132 5.5%
65 to 69 years	115 4.8%
70 to 74 years	102 4.2%
75 to 79 years	84 3.5%
80 to 84 years	72 3.0%
85 years and over	87 3.6%
Total : 2,404 100 / 100 (100%)

== Education and language ==
=== Language Spoken at Home (2017) ===
CITIZENS 18 YEARS AND OVER (Estimates)
Speak only English	1,789
Speak a language other than English	47
Spanish	21
Other languages	26
Total : 1,836

=== Educational Attainment (2017) ===
Population 18 to 24 years (Estimates)
Less than high school graduate	16
High school graduate (includes equivalency)	40
Some college or associate degree	49
Bachelor's degree or higher	11
Total : 116

== List of supervisors ==
(Town of Persia Supervisor);

- Esek B. Nash, 1835–1836
- John Thatcher, 1837–1838
- tEsek B. Nash, 1839
- John Thatcher, 1840–1841
- George W. White, 1842
- Seth Field, 1843
- Esek B. Nash, 1844
- John Thatcher, 1845
- Esek B. Nash, 1846–1848
- Amasa L. Chaffee, 1853
- Levi W. Strope, 1854
- David N. Brown, 1855–1856
- Lemuel S. Jenks, 1857–1868
- Wm. W. Henry, 1869–1870
- A.S. Bennett, 1871–1872
- Charles W. Blackney, 1873–1874
- Silas Vinton, 1875–1877
- Reuben Ross, 1878
- Silas Vinton, 1879–1880
- Ward Hooker, 1881–1882
- Byron L. Kimble, 1883–1884
- Frank C. Vinton, 1885–1887
- Joseph H.Schaack, 1888
- Frank C. Vinton, 1889–1991
- Frank L. Mattock, 1891–1893
- H. Ward Hooker, 1894
- George B. Taylor, 1895–1897
- Irving R. Leonard, 1898–1917
- Robert E. Congdom, 1918–1933
- Stanley Nielson, 1934–1937
- George Lambert, 1938–1955
- Andrew J. Musacchio, 1956–1963
- Charles Deneen, 1964–1969

== Annual events ==
=== Hollywood Happening ===
June is the month for the Annual Hollywood Happening. Part of Main Street is closed to vehicle traffic so hundreds of individuals from all over can come to display their motorcycles and take part in the "Harley" Parade on Friday evening. There are vendors, live music, great food, and various activities to partake.

=== Christmas Lighting ===
In December, a Christmas tree lighting ceremony is held in Chang Hu Park, sponsored by the Gowanda Chamber of Commerce.

== Communities and Locations in the Town of Persia ==
- Gowanda – Part of the village of Gowanda is located in the northwest corner of the town.
- Persia – The hamlet of Persia is located south of Gowanda near the west town line.
- Snyders Corners – A hamlet at the junction of County Road 4 and NY-353 in the south part of the town.
- Zoar Valley Multiple Use Area – A small part of this conservation area is in the north part of the town.
