= Otto, New York =

- Town
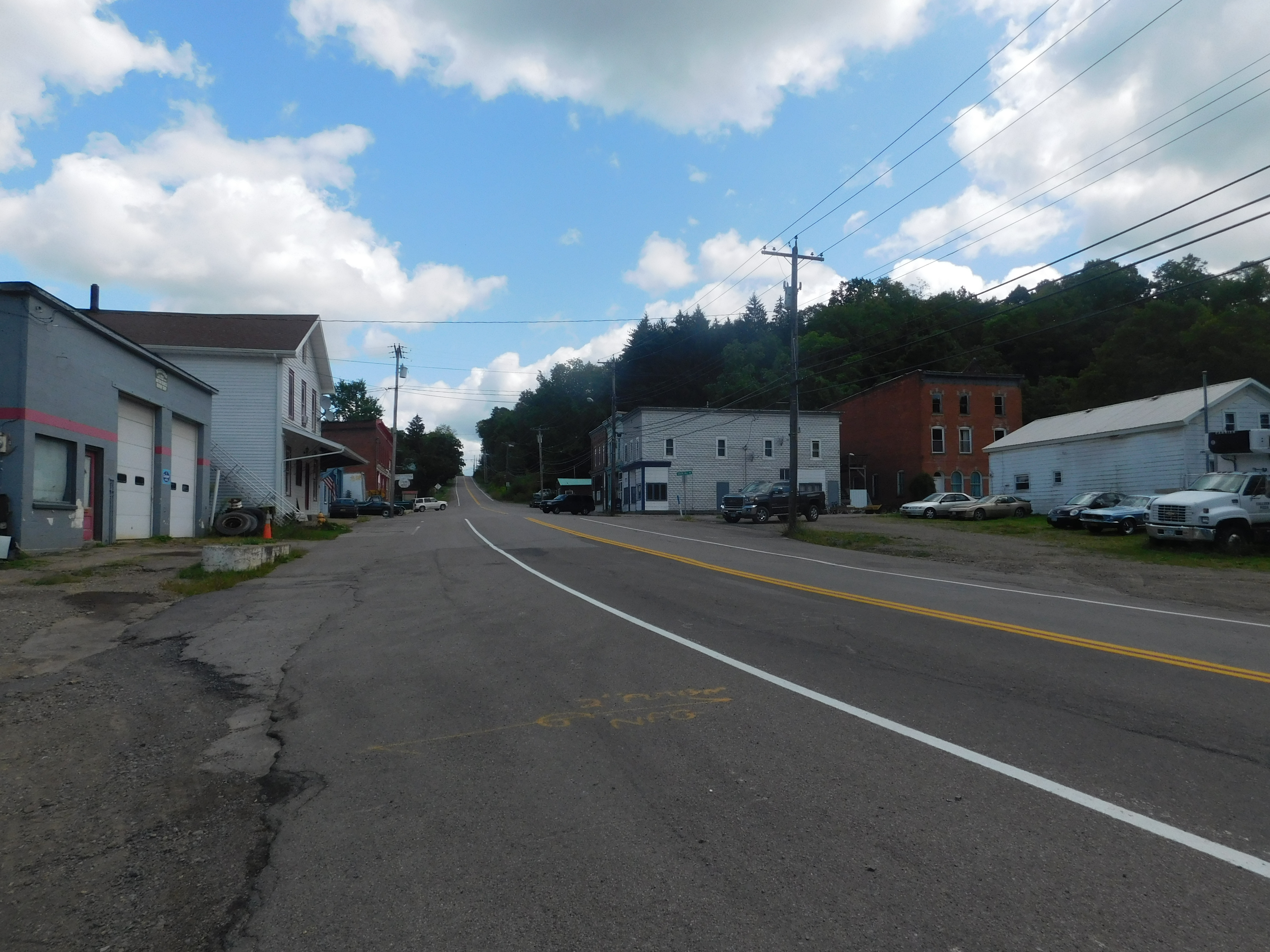
- County Route 12 in the hamlet of Otto

- Location within New York Location within the United States
- Coordinates: 42°22′57″N 78°48′53″W
- Country: United States
- State: New York
- County: Cattaraugus

Government
  - Type: Town Council
  - Town Supervisor: Randy W. Beenau (R)
  - Town Council: Brenda S. Mallaber (D); Maria C. Stang (R); James T. Wojdan (D); Francis E. Feth (R)

Area
  - Total: 32.28 sq mi (83.61 km^{2})
  - Land: 32.16 sq mi (83.30 km^{2})
  - Water: 0.12 sq mi (0.30 km^{2})
- Elevation: 1,755 ft (535 m)

Population (2020)
  - Total: 775
  - Estimate (2021): 768
  - Density: 24.2/sq mi (9.35/km^{2})
- Time zone: UTC-5 (Eastern (EST))
  - Summer (DST): UTC-4 (EDT)
- ZIP Codes: 14766 (Otto); 14719 (Cattaraugus); 14755 (Little Valley)
- Area code: 716
- FIPS code: 36-009-55783
- GNIS feature ID: 0979331
- Website: ottony.org

Otto is a town in Cattaraugus County, New York, United States. The population was 775 at the 2020 census. The name comes from Jacob S. Otto, an agent of the Holland Land Company. The town lies on the northern border of Cattaraugus County.

== History ==
The area of the town was first settled around 1816. The town of Otto was formed in 1823 from part of the town of Perrysburg. Otto returned territory to Perrysburg in 1823 and ceded land to Ashford in 1835. In 1854, the eastern half of the town was spun off and renamed East Otto.

The Medora Ball Historical Museum is listed on the National Register of Historic Places.

== Geography ==
According to the United States Census Bureau, Otto has a total area of 32.9 square miles (85.1 km^{2}), of which 32.7 square miles (84.8 km^{2}) is land and 0.12 square miles (0.3 km^{2}), or 0.36%, is water.

The north town line is formed by Cattaraugus Creek and is the border of Erie County, and the west town line is formed by the South Branch of Cattaraugus Creek.

The main highways through Otto are county roads. Cattaraugus County Route 12 is the main road through town, which extends southwestward toward Cattaraugus and northeastward toward East Otto, while Cattaraugus County Route 11 (North Otto Road) spurs northward from the hamlet of Otto through North Otto (then becomes Route 56 as it turns west on Forty Road), and Cattaraugus County Route 13 (Maples Road) splits off east of the hamlet toward Ellicottville. County Route 68 (Swamp Road) connects North Otto with East Otto.

Part of the Zoar Valley is located by the north town line.

=== Adjacent towns and areas ===
(Clockwise)

- Collins
- East Otto
- Mansfield; New Albion
- Persia

== Demographics ==
Historical population
Census	Pop.	Note	%±
1830	1,224		—
1840	2,133		74.3%
1850	2,267		6.3%
1860	1,075		−52.6%
1870	1,028		−4.4%
1880	1,111		8.1%
1890	1,042		−6.2%
1900	1,105		6.0%
1910	922		−16.6%
1920	773		−16.2%
1930	704		−8.9%
1940	642		−8.8%
1950	685		6.7%
1960	715		4.4%
1970	731		2.2%
1980	828		13.3%
1990	777		−6.2%
2000	831		6.9%
2010	808		−2.8%
2020	775		−4.1%
2021 (est.)	768		−0.9%
U.S. Decennial Census

As of the census of 2000, there were 831 people, 310 households, and 243 families residing in the town. The population density was 25.8 inhabitants per square mile (10.0/km^{2}). There were 412 housing units at an average density of 12.8 per square mile (4.9/km^{2}). The racial makeup of the town was 98.92% White, 0.72% Native American, and 0.36% from two or more races. Hispanic or Latino of any race were 0.36% of the population.

There were 310 households, out of which 32.9% had children under the age of 18 living with them, 64.8% were married couples living together, 8.4% had a female householder with no husband present, and 21.6% were non-families. 16.5% of all households were made up of individuals, and 4.8% had someone living alone who was 65 years of age or older. The average household size was 2.68 and the average family size was 2.98.

In the town, the population was spread out, with 25.0% under the age of 18, 6.5% from 18 to 24, 28.2% from 25 to 44, 27.9% from 45 to 64, and 12.4% who were 65 years of age or older. The median age was 40 years. For every 100 females, there were 99.3 males. For every 100 females age 18 and over, there were 103.6 males.

The median income for a household in the town was $37,625, and the median income for a family was $43,942. Males had a median income of $31,063 versus $24,375 for females. The per capita income for the town was $16,748. About 6.3% of families and 9.4% of the population were below the poverty line, including 11.7% of those under age 18 and 4.7% of those age 65 or over.

== Notable people ==
- Anna Botsford Comstock, leader of the nature study movement
- John P. Darling, former New York state senator
- Edwin Willits, former US congressman from Michigan, president of Michigan Agricultural College

== Communities and locations in Otto ==
- Otto (formerly "Waverly") – The hamlet of Otto is near the south town line at the junction of County Roads 11 and 12. It is the only significant settlement in the town. The Rand McNally 2021 Atlas estimates Otto's population at 550, constituting the majority of the town's population.
- North Otto – The sparsely populated and heavily agricultural area located along County Road 11 between the hamlet of Otto and Zoar Valley.
- (Old) Otto – The original hamlet of Otto is an abandoned settlement on the west town line, along the South Branch of the Cattaraugus Creek. A road, Gibson Hill Road, leads to the original location; the creek crossing that connected it to Skinner Hollow Road in neighboring Persia no longer exists.
- Zoar Valley Multiple Use Area – A conservation area in the northern part of the town.
