= Salamanca (town), New York =

Salamanca, New York Dejonyöwe:gwa:ön or Onë́’dagö:h
- Town
- Location within New York Location within the United States
- Coordinates: 42°10′4″N 78°46′37″W
- Country: United States
- State: New York
- County: Cattaraugus

Area
  - Total: 18.25 sq mi (47.28 km^{2})
  - Land: 18.25 sq mi (47.28 km^{2})
  - Water: 0 sq mi (0.00 km^{2})
- Elevation: 1,417 ft (432 m)

Population (2020)
  - Total: 470
  - Estimate (2022): 464
  - Density: 25.7/sq mi (9.94/km^{2})
- Time zone: UTC-5 (Eastern (EST))
  - Summer (DST): UTC-4 (EDT)
- ZIP Code: 14779 (Salamanca); 14755 (Little Valley)
- Area code: 716
- FIPS code: 36-64760
- GNIS feature ID: 0979451
- Website: townofsalamanca.org

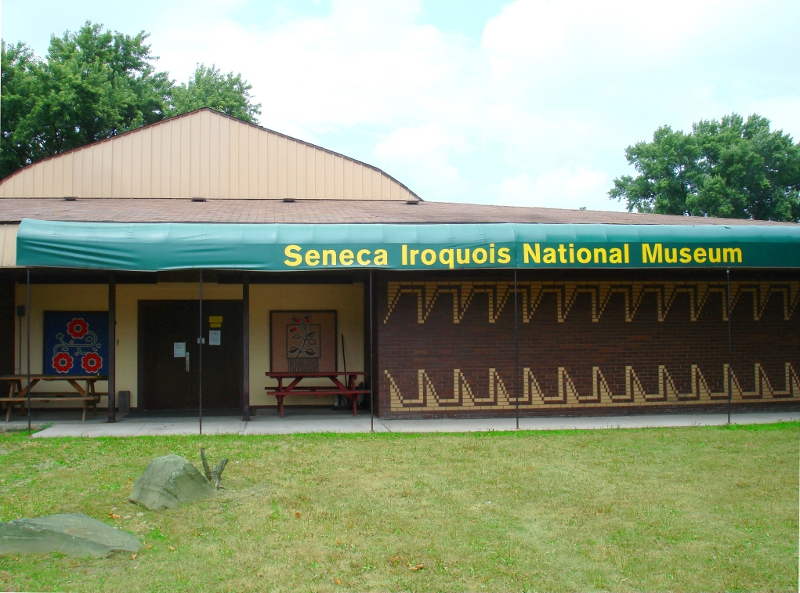
Seneca Iroquois National Museum, in Salamanca, NY, USA

Salamanca (Seneca: Dejonyöwe:gwa:ön or Onë́’dagö:h) is a town in Cattaraugus County, New York, United States. The population was 470 at the 2020 census. The name is from José de Salamanca y Mayol, Marquis of Salamanca, a major Spanish investor in the Atlantic and Great Western Railroad, a local railroad.

The town of Salamanca is in the south part of the county. The city of Salamanca, located within the Allegany Indian Reservation of the Seneca Nation of Indians, bisects the town.

== History ==
This was historically the territory of the Native American Wenrohronon and Eriehronon, who were driven out by the Seneca Nation in the Beaver Wars of the 1650s. The Seneca controlled much of the territory of western New York as one of the nations of the powerful Haudenosaunee Confederacy. The area was not settled by European Americans until after the American Revolution around 1815, when the Seneca had been forced to cede their lands to the United States and New York as allies of the defeated British. Many of the early arrivals were Europeans who settled on Native American land with the informal permission and toleration of tribal members.

The area was a sparsely populated, rural, farming and lumber industry region until four railroads were constructed into the area. They leased a portion of land, then mostly swamp, from the Seneca Nation to make their hub at what was developed as Salamanca.

The town of Salamanca was formed in 1854 from part of the town of Little Valley. At that time it was called the "town of Bucktooth", named after a notable Seneca who lived in the area. At least two roads leading to the town still bear the name "Bucktooth Run". In 1869, the town of Red House was created, taking away the south part of the town of Salamanca. In 1870 the community of Salamanca began to define itself, first as a village, and later as a city.

== Geography ==
According to the United States Census Bureau, the town has a total area of 18.4 square miles (47.6 km^{2}), all land.

New York State Route 353 is a north-south highway in the town. The Southern Tier Expressway (Interstate 86) runs through the Seneca reservation in the middle of the town. New York State Route 417 closely parallels the expressway. Route 951T (Old Route 17) serves the southwestern portion of the town.

== Adjacent towns and areas ==
The town of Salamanca is divided into two parts by the Allegany Reservation, which is a sovereign part of the Seneca Nation. This division parallels the Allegheny River. The city of Salamanca is also located in the split between the two portions of the town. North of the town is Little Valley, and south is the town of Red House. On its west side, Salamanca forms a border with the towns of Coldspring and Napoli. To the east is the town of Great Valley.

== Demographics ==
Historical population
Census	Pop.	Note	%±
1860	900		—
1870	1,881		109.0%
1880	3,408		81.2%
1890	4,572		34.2%
1900	5,074		11.0%
1910	316		−93.8%
1920	361		14.2%
1930	330		−8.6%
1940	313		−5.2%
1950	355		13.4%
1960	432		21.7%
1970	571		32.2%
1980	608		6.5%
1990	477		−21.5%
2000	544		14.0%
2010	481		−11.6%
2020	470		−2.3%
2022 (est.)	464		−1.3%
U.S. Decennial Census

As of the census of 2000, there were 544 people, 210 households, and 160 families residing in the town. The population density was 29.8 inhabitants per square mile (11.5/km^{2}). There were 238 housing units at an average density of 13.0 per square mile (5.0/km^{2}). The racial makeup of the town was 97.06% White, 0.37% Black or African American, 1.29% Native American, and 1.29% from two or more races. Hispanic or Latino of any race were 0.55% of the population.

There were 210 households, out of which 31.9% had children under the age of 18 living with them, 65.2% were married couples living together, 6.2% had a female householder with no husband present, and 23.8% were non-families. 18.6% of all households were made up of individuals, and 10.0% had someone living alone who was 65 years of age or older. The average household size was 2.59 and the average family size was 2.96.

In the town, the population was spread out, with 22.2% under the age of 18, 7.9% from 18 to 24, 26.7% from 25 to 44, 27.4% from 45 to 64, and 15.8% who were 65 years of age or older. The median age was 41 years. For every 100 females, there were 108.4 males. For every 100 females age 18 and over, there were 100.5 males.

The median income for a household in the town was $37,500, and the median income for a family was $43,889. Males had a median income of $32,344 versus $17,813 for females. The per capita income for the town was $16,214. About 2.5% of families and 4.2% of the population were below the poverty line, including 1.8% of those under age 18 and 5.6% of those age 65 or over.

== Communities and locations in the Town of Salamanca ==
- Allegany Reservation – The Seneca reservation runs through the center of the town.
- Allegheny River – The river runs through the center of the town and the Seneca reservation.
- Allegany State Park – A small part of the park is in the south part of the town.
- Bucktooth Run – A small stream that enters the Allegheny River west of Salamanca City. A sizable farming community lies along the stream as well as the road that runs along it, informally nicknamed "Bucktooth."
- Jimerson Town – A hamlet southwest of the city of Salamanca. It is the alternate capital and site of the Allegany Reservation's governmental headquarters.
- Little Valley Creek – A stream flowing into the Allegheny River in Salamanca City.
- Newton Run – A stream flowing into the Allegheny River east of Bucktooth Run.
- Salamanca – Most of the city of Salamanca is inside the town lines.
- Sawmill Run – A stream (and marked hamlet) in the northwest corner of the town.
- Shongo – A hamlet inside the Seneca reservation in the southwest part of the town, south of Jimerson Town.
- Titus Run – A stream flowing into the Allegheny River from the south.
