= Pat McGee Trail =

Rail trail in US

The Pat McGee Trail is a rail trail in Cattaraugus County, New York, United States, named for Patricia McGee (1934-2005).

== Background ==
Pat McGee was an area legislator of Cattaraugus County who lived in Franklinville, New York, and the trail was named in her memory. McGee served as a member of the New York State Assembly and as a New York State Senator for many years.

The trail path lies entirely on a railbed that was used by the New York and Lake Erie Railroad from 1978 to 1990 and, before that, by the Erie Railroad and the Erie Lackawanna Railroad. The existence of the railroad was the primary impetus for the relocation of the county seat of Cattaraugus County to Little Valley. The closure of the Cattaraugus Cutlery Company in 1963 and a factory that had most recently been used by King Windows in the 1980s (now used by Ellicottville Brewing Company) rendered the railroad of little use to Little Valley, and in 1990 the New York and Lake Erie truncated the rail service to Setterstix in Cattaraugus, before eventually discontinuing service on the entire fork by the 2010s.

The Cattaraugus Local Development Corporation (CLDC) acquired the railbed several years after the railroad's closure and removed the rails and ties. Under the preliminary name "Southern Tier Area Rails to Trails" (START), the trail opened for public use in the early 2000s.

In March 2021, the CLDC entered negotiations to sell the trail to the New York State Office of Parks, Recreation and Historic Preservation. The proposed sale drew some controversy from the original START group, which had turned the trail over to the CLDC for $1, and stated that while they had no objections to the state buying the trail, they were concerned that the CLDC was using the sale to profit and exploit the original below-market-value sale price, a charge the CLDC denied. The sale finalized in April, with a portion of the sale price being set aside to aid in the trail's maintenance.

== Description ==
The trail, which was formally dedicated in June 2005 (shortly after McGee's death), includes five trailheads with its main trailhead being located in Little Valley, New York. The trail parallels New York State Route 353 and, in its southern half, the Little Valley Creek. As of 2013, the trail stretches for more than 12 miles, and connects seven municipalities in the area, running between County Route 6 in the town of New Albion (less than a mile south of the Cattaraugus village line) and the boundary of the city of Salamanca. The Finger Lakes Trail (a section of the North Country Trail) intersects the Pat McGee Trail at Woodworth Hollow Road in the hamlet of Elkdale; since a 2017 reroute of the Finger Lakes Trail, it now shares as wrong-way concurrency with the McGee trail from Woodworth Hollow north to the Elkdale State Forest for a distance of 0.9 miles (1.4 km).

The trail is open to pedestrian, horseback and bicycle traffic during the spring, summer and autumn months and snowmobile traffic in the winter months when conditions permit. Other than snowmobiles, the use of motorized off-road vehicles (except for trail maintenance staff) is prohibited.
