= Perrysburg (CDP), New York =

Perrysburg, New York
- Hamlet and CDP
- Location within the state of New York
- Coordinates: 42°27′28″N 79°0′3″W
- Country: United States
- State: New York
- County: Cattaraugus
- Town: Perrysburg
- Incorporated: 1916
- Dissolved: December 31, 2011

Area
  - Total: 0.99 sq mi (2.56 km^{2})
  - Land: 0.98 sq mi (2.55 km^{2})
  - Water: 0.0039 sq mi (0.01 km^{2})
- Elevation: 1,322 ft (403 m)

Population (2020)
  - Total: 346
  - Density: 352/sq mi (135.9/km^{2})
- Time zone: UTC-5 (Eastern (EST))
  - Summer (DST): UTC-4 (EDT)
- ZIP code: 14129
- Area code: 716
- FIPS code: 36-57287
- GNIS feature ID: 0960215

Perrysburg is a hamlet, census-designated place, and former village in Cattaraugus County, New York, United States. The population was 401 at the 2010 census. It is named after Commodore Oliver Hazard Perry. The community is in the south-central part of the town of Perrysburg. The hamlet is west of Gowanda.

== History ==
A settlement has been located in the general area of the current village since the early 19th century. Early settlers included veterans of the War for American Independence and the War of 1812, who had used their pensions to buy farmland through the Holland Land Company. The village of Perrysburg was incorporated in 1916. Both the village and the town have been spelled "Perrysburgh" in the past.

By 1880, the population of the village of Perrysburg was about 400, with many more living in the surrounding town. It was also a station stop on the New York & Erie Railroad.

In 1910, the city of Buffalo, beset by the public scourge of tuberculosis, purchased almost 300 acres (1.2 km^{2}) of land adjacent to the village using proceeds from Mayor James Noble Adam's personal fortune, for the purpose of establishing the Buffalo Municipal Hospital for Incipient Tuberculosis. The facility opened in 1912 and later became the J. N. Adam Memorial Hospital. The presence of the hospital led to a dramatic increase in the local population with the arrival of medical professionals, hospital workers and people visiting patients at the facility.

Since the hospital closed its doors, a popular local legend holds that a stained glass dome in the Hall Rotunda was salvaged from the Temple of Music at Buffalo's Pan-American Exposition. However, a visual comparison between the surviving dome and this rendering shows no resemblance between the two.

On March 16, 2010, voters approved, by a 60-9 margin, a referendum to dissolve the village into the town of Perrysburg. The dissolution took effect at the end of 2011. Perrysburg joined Randolph, East Randolph and Limestone among Cattaraugus County villages that voted to dissolve within a six-month span, with all but Limestone having approved their dissolutions on March 16.

== Geography ==
Perrysburg is located at 42°27′28″N 79°0′3″W (42.457801, -79.000855).

According to the United States Census Bureau, the village has a total area of 1.0 square mile (2.6 km^{2}), all land.

The village is at the junction of NY State Route 39 and County Road 58, the former northern terminus of NY 353.

== Demographics ==
Historical population
Census	Pop.	Note	%±
2020	346		—
U.S. Decennial Census

As of the census of 2000, there were 408 people, 146 households, and 96 families residing in the village. The population density was 413.5 inhabitants per square mile (159.7/km^{2}). There were 162 housing units at an average density of 164.2 per square mile (63.4/km^{2}). The racial makeup of the village was 93.87% White, 0.98% Black or African American, 3.68% Native American, 0.74% from other races, and 0.74% from two or more races. Hispanic or Latino of any race were 0.98% of the population.

There were 146 households, out of which 31.5% had children under the age of 18 living with them, 46.6% were married couples living together, 14.4% had a female householder with no husband present, and 34.2% were non-families. 30.8% of all households were made up of individuals, and 15.1% had someone living alone who was 65 years of age or older. The average household size was 2.34 and the average family size was 2.88.

In the village, the population was spread out, with 20.3% under the age of 18, 7.1% from 18 to 24, 29.2% from 25 to 44, 29.4% from 45 to 64, and 14.0% who were 65 years of age or older. The median age was 42 years. For every 100 females, there were 96.2 males. For every 100 females age 18 and over, there were 93.5 males.

The median income for a household in the village was $37,045, and the median income for a family was $43,125. Males had a median income of $36,406 versus $24,219 for females. The per capita income for the village was $17,190. About 7.9% of families and 24.0% of the population were below the poverty line, including 26.5% of those under age 18 and 42.9% of those age 65 or over.
