= Little Valley, New York =

- Town
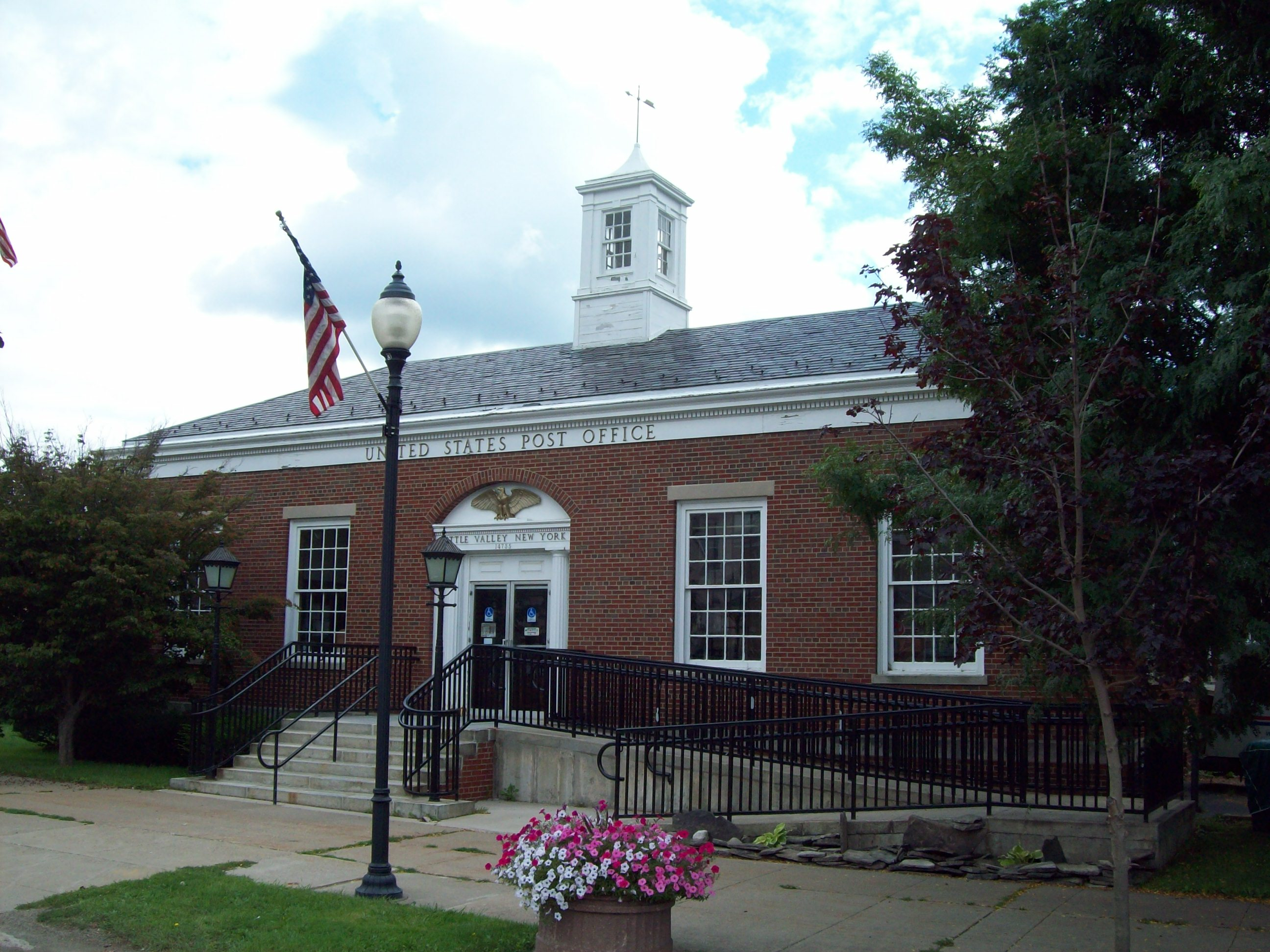
- Little Valley Post Office

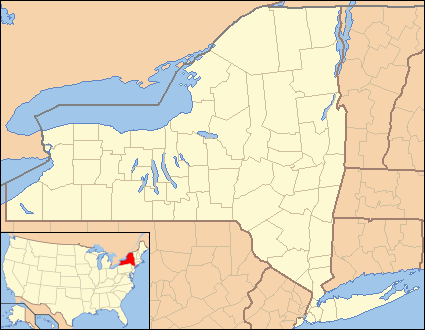
- Location within the state of New York
- Coordinates: 42°14′58″N 078°47′59″W
- Country: United States
- State: New York
- County: Cattaraugus

Government
  - Type: Town Council
  - Town Supervisor: Peter Wrona (R)
  - Town Council: Members' List: • Philip J. Gross (R); • David A. Shinners (R); • Holly Urbanski (R); • vacant

Area
  - Total: 29.92 sq mi (77.49 km^{2})
  - Land: 29.91 sq mi (77.47 km^{2})
  - Water: 0.0077 sq mi (0.02 km^{2})

Population (2020)
  - Total: 1,672
  - Estimate (2021): 1,663
  - Density: 56/sq mi (21.8/km^{2})
- Time zone: UTC-5 (Eastern (EST))
  - Summer (DST): UTC-4 (EDT)
- ZIP Codes: 14755 (Little Valley); 14779 (Salamanca)
- FIPS code: 36-009-42840
- Website: www.littlevalleyny.gov

Little Valley is a town in Cattaraugus County, New York, United States. The population was 1,672 at the 2020 census. The town is named after its local geographical setting, a relative comparison of two tributaries (the other being the neighboring Great Valley) of the Allegheny River.

The town of Little Valley is centrally located in the county, north of the city of Salamanca. The town contains a village also named Little Valley, which is the county seat.

== History ==
The first white settlers arrived as early as 1808, however they vacated due to frontier warfare in the War of 1812; settlement resumed in 1816, after the war ended. The town of Little Valley was formed in 1818 by splitting the town of Perry, which at the time covered the entire western half of the county. The northwest quadrant of the county became Perrysburg, while the southwest quadrant became Little Valley (also known as the town of Elkdale); at the same time, the town of Great Valley was split off from Olean, and the two towns' proximity and comparable topography gave the towns their names. Little Valley was once an important rail station on the Erie Railroad and notable for its cheese and dairy industry. The location of the railroad resulted in moving the county seat to the village of Little Valley, which was also later connected to Salamanca by a streetcar line.

The towns of Conewango (1823), Napoli (1823), Mansfield (1830), New Albion (1830), and Bucktooth (1855, renamed Salamanca in 1864) were all formed from Little Valley.

== Geography ==
According to the United States Census Bureau, the town has a total area of 29.8 square miles (77.2 km^{2}), of which 0.008 square miles (0.02 km^{2}), or 0.02%, is water.

New York State Route 242 and New York State Route 353 are major truck roads through the town. They converge at Killborn Corners just east of the village of Little Valley. County Routes 88 (Baker Road) and 96 (Killborn Corners Road) act as bypasses. County Route 15 (Dublin Road), which picks up where Route 88 leaves off, continues northeast parallel to Route 242 between Little Valley and Ellicottville. County Routes 5 and 14 start in the northwest corner of the town and head toward New Albion and East Otto, respectively.

The Pat McGee Trail, a hiking and snowmobile rail trail that follows the path of the now-removed railroad, runs through the town parallel to Route 353. The Conservation Trail, a subset of the Finger Lakes Trail (itself a subset of the North Country Trail), passes through the town connecting the state forests therein; the two trails share a roughly one-mile wrong-way concurrency in the town.

Little Valley Creek flows through the town, as does a small tributary named Lees Hollow in the west central part of town. Whig Street Creek runs northeast-to-southwest across the town.

=== Adjacent towns and areas ===
Little Valley is north of the town of Salamanca and south of the town of Mansfield. The town is east of the town of Napoli and west of the town of Great Valley; a series of hills separate Little Valley and Great Valley, and they can only be traveled between each other directly through one seasonal highway (Mutton Hollow Road) or by a network of pedestrian, bicycle and horse trails. (Otherwise, major highways run through either Salamanca or Ellicottville.)

=== Climate ===
Climate data for Little Valley, New York, 1991–2020 normals, 1941-2020 extremes: 1625ft (495m)
Month	Jan	Feb	Mar	Apr	May	Jun	Jul	Aug	Sep	Oct	Nov	Dec	Year
Record high °F (°C)	70 (21)	71 (22)	80 (27)	88 (31)	90 (32)	95 (35)	96 (36)	98 (37)	95 (35)	86 (30)	77 (25)	71 (22)	98 (37)
Mean maximum °F (°C)	54.5 (12.5)	54.1 (12.3)	65.1 (18.4)	77.5 (25.3)	83.9 (28.8)	86.6 (30.3)	87.7 (30.9)	86.6 (30.3)	84.2 (29.0)	76.1 (24.5)	66.8 (19.3)	55.2 (12.9)	89.3 (31.8)
Mean daily maximum °F (°C)	30.5 (−0.8)	32.6 (0.3)	41.0 (5.0)	54.6 (12.6)	66.8 (19.3)	74.8 (23.8)	78.7 (25.9)	77.3 (25.2)	70.8 (21.6)	58.6 (14.8)	46.3 (7.9)	35.4 (1.9)	55.6 (13.1)
Daily mean °F (°C)	22.0 (−5.6)	22.8 (−5.1)	30.2 (−1.0)	42.7 (5.9)	54.2 (12.3)	62.7 (17.1)	66.7 (19.3)	65.4 (18.6)	58.9 (14.9)	47.8 (8.8)	37.5 (3.1)	28.0 (−2.2)	44.9 (7.2)
Mean daily minimum °F (°C)	13.5 (−10.3)	13.0 (−10.6)	19.4 (−7.0)	30.8 (−0.7)	41.6 (5.3)	50.5 (10.3)	54.7 (12.6)	53.5 (11.9)	47.1 (8.4)	37.1 (2.8)	28.7 (−1.8)	20.6 (−6.3)	34.2 (1.2)
Mean minimum °F (°C)	−10.1 (−23.4)	−7.6 (−22.0)	−1.1 (−18.4)	17.4 (−8.1)	27.7 (−2.4)	36.2 (2.3)	43.3 (6.3)	41.9 (5.5)	33.6 (0.9)	24.8 (−4.0)	13.6 (−10.2)	1.4 (−17.0)	−13.7 (−25.4)
Record low °F (°C)	−26 (−32)	−28 (−33)	−19 (−28)	5 (−15)	20 (−7)	29 (−2)	33 (1)	31 (−1)	22 (−6)	14 (−10)	−5 (−21)	−22 (−30)	−28 (−33)
Average precipitation inches (mm)	4.28 (109)	2.54 (65)	3.48 (88)	3.85 (98)	3.88 (99)	4.63 (118)	5.23 (133)	4.28 (109)	4.45 (113)	4.68 (119)	4.04 (103)	3.78 (96)	49.12 (1,250)
Average snowfall inches (cm)	36.1 (92)	25.9 (66)	18.9 (48)	4.0 (10)	0.0 (0.0)	0.0 (0.0)	0.0 (0.0)	0.0 (0.0)	0.0 (0.0)	1.0 (2.5)	16.3 (41)	31.1 (79)	133.3 (338.5)
Average extreme snow depth inches (cm)	17.6 (45)	15.8 (40)	11.6 (29)	3.1 (7.9)	0.0 (0.0)	0.0 (0.0)	0.0 (0.0)	0.0 (0.0)	0.0 (0.0)	0.8 (2.0)	7.8 (20)	14.3 (36)	22.4 (57)
Average precipitation days (≥ 0.01 in)	19.6	15.4	14.9	14.8	13.2	13.9	12.8	12.5	11.8	15.4	15.7	20.1	180.1
Average snowy days (≥ 0.1 in)	13.5	10.8	7.4	2.3	0.0	0.0	0.0	0.0	0.0	0.5	5.0	11.3	50.8
Source 1: NOAA
Source 2: XMACIS2 (records, monthly max/mins & snow depth)

== Demographics ==
Historical population
Census	Pop.	Note	%±
1820	484		—
1830	336		−30.6%
1840	700		108.3%
1850	1,383		97.6%
1860	1,206		−12.8%
1870	1,168		−3.2%
1880	1,196		2.4%
1890	1,326		10.9%
1900	1,616		21.9%
1910	1,905		17.9%
1920	1,683		−11.7%
1930	1,542		−8.4%
1940	1,601		3.8%
1950	1,724		7.7%
1960	1,737		0.8%
1970	1,838		5.8%
1980	1,830		−0.4%
1990	1,881		2.8%
2000	1,788		−4.9%
2010	1,740		−2.7%
2020	1,672		−3.9%
2021 (est.)	1,663	▼	−0.5%
U.S. Decennial Census

As of the census of 2000, there were 1,788 people, 688 households, and 462 families residing in the town. The population density was 59.7 inhabitants per square mile (23.1/km^{2}). There were 845 housing units at an average density of 28.2 per square mile (10.9/km^{2}). The racial makeup of the town was 95.92% White, 1.29% Black or African American, 1.23% Native American, 0.06% from other races, and 1.51% from two or more races. Hispanic or Latino of any race were 1.23% of the population.

There were 688 households, out of which 30.7% had children under the age of 18 living with them, 50.7% were married couples living together, 11.5% had a female householder with no husband present, and 32.8% were non-families. 28.6% of all households were made up of individuals, and 15.7% had someone living alone who was 65 years of age or older. The average household size was 2.42 and the average family size was 2.95.

In the town, the population was spread out, with 23.8% under the age of 18, 8.7% from 18 to 24, 29.1% from 25 to 44, 22.9% from 45 to 64, and 15.5% who were 65 years of age or older. The median age was 38 years. For every 100 females, there were 109.4 males. For every 100 females age 18 and over, there were 106.8 males.

The median income for a household in the town was $31,000, and the median income for a family was $37,361. Males had a median income of $30,100 versus $21,897 for females. The per capita income for the town was $16,191. About 8.8% of families and 14.0% of the population were below the poverty line, including 19.5% of those under age 18 and 9.2% of those age 65 or over.

== Communities and locations in the Town of Little Valley ==
- Bucktooth State Forest – A small portion of this state forest crosses the southwestern corner of Little Valley.
- Elkdale – A hamlet near the south town line on NY Route 353.
- Elkdale State Forest – A small state forest between Little Valley and Elkdale.
- Killborn Corners – A small knoll and fork in the road (known locally as "The Y") that divides NY 353 and NY 242.
- Little Valley – A village in the northwest corner of the town that serves as the county seat.
- Little Valley Creek – A stream that flows southward through the town and empties into the Allegheny River in Salamanca.
- Little Rock City – A location in the southeast part of the town, named after an unusual geological formation, called by various names such as "Salamanca Rock City" or "Rock City State Forest" (to distinguish it from Rock City Park in the Town of Olean). Legally known as the Rock City and McCarty Hill State Forests, which includes the rock city as well as several square miles of forest land covering most of the eastern half of the village.
- Salamanca – A small, unpopulated part of the city of Salamanca juts northward into the southeastern region of the town. The anomalous spur primarily exists to cover the city's drinking water supply, which is located along the spur.

== Attractions and organizations ==
Attractions and organizations in the town of Little Valley (not counting those in the village) include:

- An American Legion post (531), west of the village
- A Veterans of Foreign Wars/AMVETS post (VFW 8734/AMVETS 8735), east of the village
- The Cattaraugus County Department of Public Works building, located southwest of the village on Route 242
- Valley View Baptist Church, a church near Killborn Corners
- Whig Street Church, a nondenominational church (formerly United Brethren) located on Whig Street in the southeastern portion of the town
- Little Valley Wesleyan Church, a church located on the town/village line across from the Cattaraugus County Fair Grounds on Route 353
- Little Valley Riders Club, a horseback riding organization
- Legion Field, located just west of the American Legion post, previously leased by Little Valley Central School for athletic events. The Little Valley Panthers youth football team used Legion Field as their home through 2013, while soccer and baseball/softball teams also used the field regularly (both the Legion Field diamond and a softball diamond on the Riders Club grounds were mostly abandoned after the construction of a new ballpark in the village; Legion Field's diamond remains usable). Cattaraugus-Little Valley Central School mostly abandoned the field in 2013 and was sold off to private ownership in 2016. A local adult flag football league continues to use the field for athletic purposes.
- The Crosspatch, a horse ranch
- Elkdale Country Club, an 18-hole golf course
