= Cattaraugus, New York =

- Village
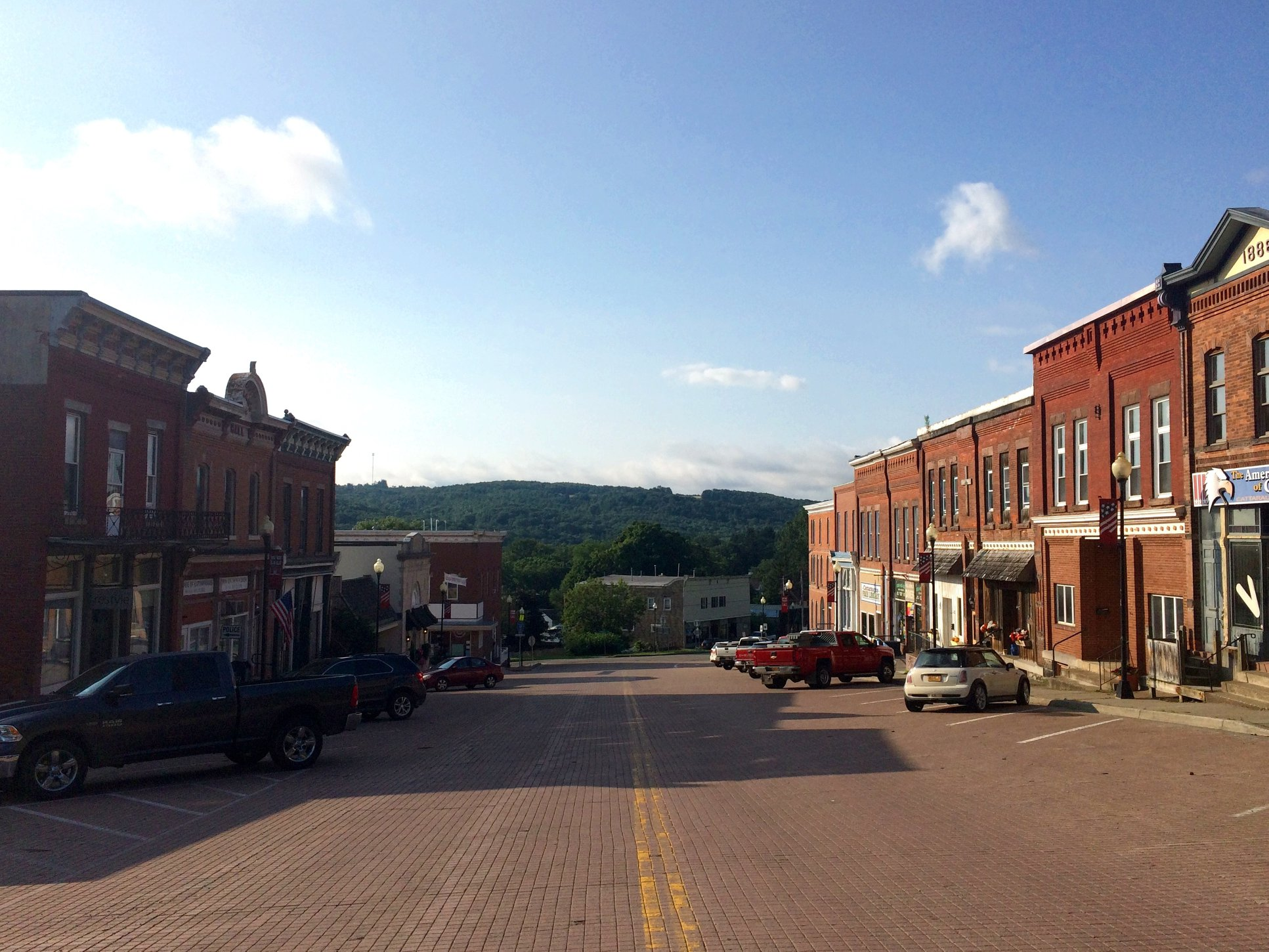
- Main Street (NY 353) through downtown Cattaraugus.

- Location within the state of New York
- Coordinates: 42°19′48″N 78°51′56″W
- Country: United States
- State: New York
- County: Cattaraugus
- Town: New Albion

Area
  - Total: 1.12 sq mi (2.90 km^{2})
  - Land: 1.12 sq mi (2.89 km^{2})
  - Water: 0.0039 sq mi (0.01 km^{2})
- Elevation: 1,375 ft (419 m)

Population (2020)
  - Total: 960
  - Density: 859.1/sq mi (331.71/km^{2})
- Time zone: UTC-5 (Eastern (EST))
  - Summer (DST): UTC-4 (EDT)
- ZIP code: 14719
- Area code: 716
- FIPS code: 36-13024
- GNIS feature ID: 0946066
- Website: cattaraugusny.org

Cattaraugus is a village in Cattaraugus County, New York, United States. The population was 996 at the 2020 census. The village lies in the northeast part of the town of New Albion, north of Salamanca.

== History ==
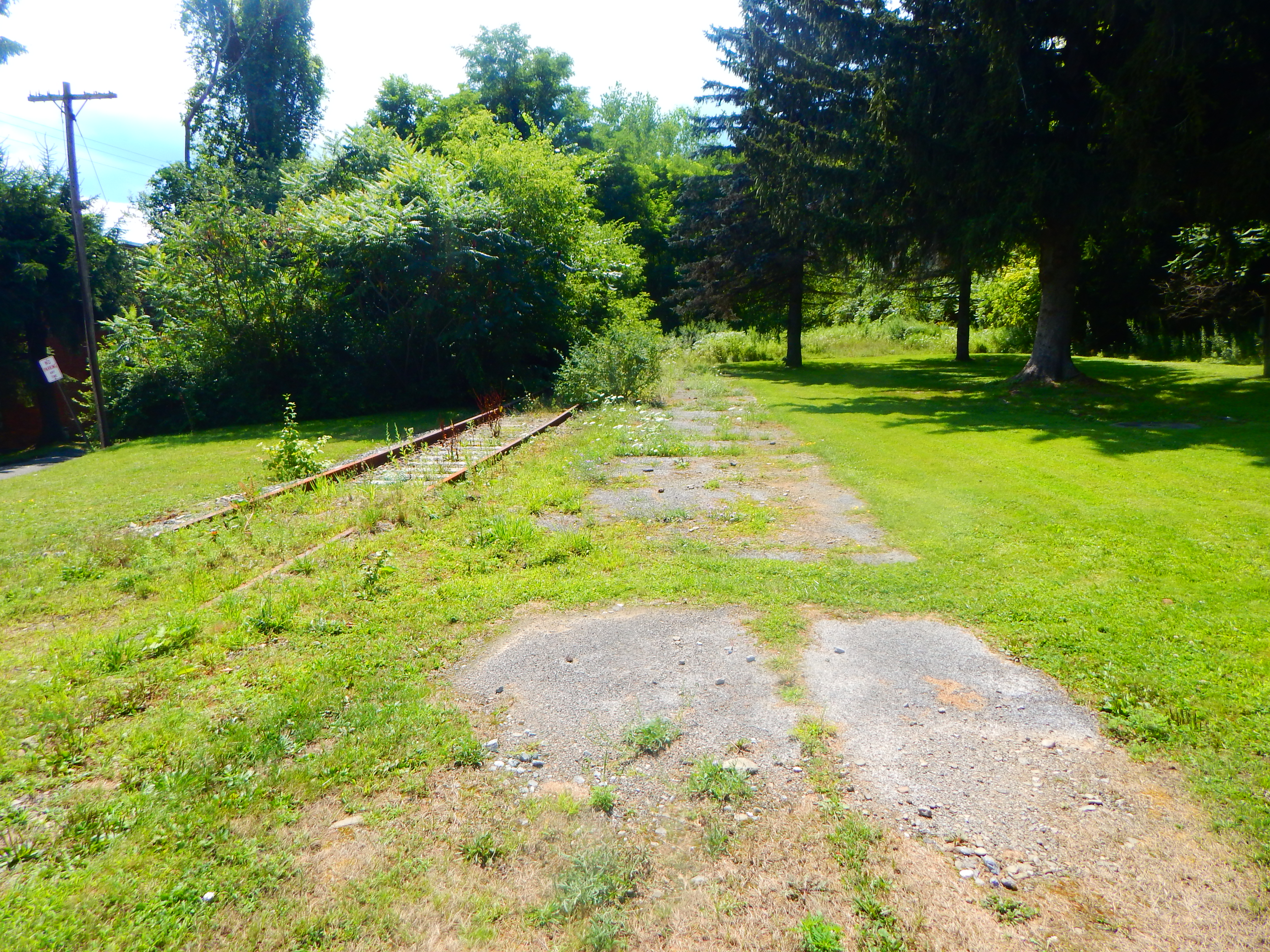
Cattaraugus station of the Erie Railroad site in August 2015

In 1828, the brothers Calvin and Arad Rich settled in the hills surrounding the area. Cattaraugus developed most after the arrival of the Erie Railroad in 1851. Shortly after, the village became a boomtown growing to 1,500 inhabitants and even being visited by US President Millard Fillmore. By 1860 the township boasted 305 dwellings, 1557 oxen, 383 horses, and 8 school districts with 649 children in school. In the same year, it is well documented Abraham Lincoln had come to visit. Other prominent visitors include US Presidents Teddy Roosevelt and Franklin D. Roosevelt. As well as Mark Twain who then named his housecat “Cattaraugus" The village was incorporated in 1882. Its name derives from Cattaraugus Creek.

The Cattaraugus Village Commercial Historic District was listed on the National Register of Historic Places in 2014.

== Geography ==
Cattaraugus is located in the northern part of the town of New Albion at 42°19′48″N 78°51′56″W (42.330044, -78.865673).

According to the United States Census Bureau, the village has a total area of 1.1 square miles (2.9 km^{2}), all land.

NY Route 353 and Skinner Hollow pass through the village. Cattaraugus County Route 12 (which follows the briefly designated NY 264 of the 1930s), the only county route in the county to enter a village, enters the village from the northeast and terminates within the village. The village is built primarily on a hillside; the southwestern portion of the village (around Route 353) is on the highest ground, while a series of side streets run downhill from Route 353 heading northeast. Only two of the village's streets run uphill from Route 353: Rumsey Street (the easternmost tip of Waite Hollow Road) on the village's southern boundary and West Street at the peak of the hill.

Since 2013, the Seneca Transit System has provided public bus service to the village.

The New York and Lake Erie Railroad terminates at a Setterstix plant in Cattaraugus after the portion of the railway southeast of Cattaraugus was decommissioned in the early 1990s. The rail service has been disrupted by floods and landslides since the late 2000s. The right-of-way of the portion heading southeast from Cattaraugus is now the Pat McGee Trail, which was established in 2005.

== Demographics ==
Historical population
Census	Pop.	Note	%±
1880	705		—
1890	878		24.5%
1900	1,382		57.4%
1910	1,165		−15.7%
1920	1,347		15.6%
1930	1,236		−8.2%
1940	1,145		−7.4%
1950	1,190		3.9%
1960	1,258		5.7%
1970	1,200		−4.6%
1980	1,200		0.0%
1990	1,100		−8.3%
2000	1,075		−2.3%
2010	1,002		−6.8%
2020	960		−4.2%
2021 (est.)	986	▲	2.7%
U.S. Decennial Census

As of the census of 2000, there were 1,075 people, 437 households, and 281 families residing in the village. The population density was 959.6 inhabitants per square mile (370.5/km^{2}). There were 485 housing units at an average density of 432.9 per square mile (167.1/km^{2}). The racial makeup of the village was 98.51% White, 0.56% Native American, 0.28% from other races, and 0.65% from two or more races. Hispanic or Latino of any race were 1.40% of the population.

There were 437 households, out of which 34.8% had children under the age of 18 living with them, 49.2% were married couples living together, 10.5% had a female householder with no husband present, and 35.5% were non-families. 30.9% of all households were made up of individuals, and 14.6% had someone living alone who was 65 years of age or older. The average household size was 2.44 and the average family size was 3.07.

In the village, the population was spread out, with 28.0% under the age of 18, 7.2% from 18 to 24, 25.8% from 25 to 44, 23.2% from 45 to 64, and 15.9% who were 65 years of age or older. The median age was 37 years. For every 100 females, there were 99.8 males. For every 100 females age 18 and over, there were 91.1 males.

The median income for a household in the village was $30,664, and the median income for a family was $35,417. Males had a median income of $27,434 versus $19,833 for females. The per capita income for the village was $16,605. About 7.4% of families and 11.0% of the population were below the poverty line, including 14.2% of those under age 18 and 4.7% of those age 65 or over.

== Economy ==
The Cattaraugus-Little Valley Central School is the largest employer in the village. The school's only active campus is located at the former Cattaraugus Central School building in the northeast corner of the village on County Route 12; it was constructed in 1954 as a high school, then expanded in 1991 for an elementary school wing and again in 2011 to accommodate added students from the takeover of Little Valley Central School. A former elementary school, abandoned since 1992, is in the center of the village.

Industry has historically been a significant portion of the Cattaraugus economy. The Chester-Jensen Company is located in the village. Setterstix, a lollipop stick manufacturer, was founded in the village and operated there until relocating to South Carolina in 2021. In 2025, Canadian manufacturer Daich Coatings agreed to purchase and reopen the former Setterstix facility. Outside of that, Cattaraugus's economy mostly capitalizes on its location far away from most major municipalities (the nearest city of more than 10,000 is more than 20 miles (32 km) away in any direction). The only national franchise in Cattaraugus is a Dollar General, which opened in 2010. Other businesses include the Bank of Cattaraugus (founded 1882, considered the first bank in the region) and Perky's Market, the local grocery store.

== Notable people ==
- William Buffington Jr., former member of the New York State Assembly
- Alexander Chambers, Union general in American Civil War
- John P. Darling, former New York state senator
- Clarence B. Farrar, influential psychiatrist
- Ezra F. Kysor, architect
- Joel H. Lyman, Medal of Honor recipient
- Samuel Allen Rice, colonel in the 33rd regiment of Iowa during the American Civil War
- Peter Linebaugh, radical historian, teacher, and author
