= National Register of Historic Places listings in Cattaraugus County, New York =

Location of Cattaraugus County in New York

This is intended to be a complete list of properties and districts listed on the National Register of Historic Places in Cattaraugus County, New York. The locations of National Register properties and districts for which the latitude and longitude coordinates are included below, may be seen in a map.

This National Park Service list is complete through NPS recent listings posted May 1, 2026.

Contents: Counties in New York
Albany (Albany) – Allegany – Bronx – Broome – Cattaraugus – Cayuga – Chautauqua – Chemung – Chenango – Clinton – Columbia – Cortland – Delaware – Dutchess (Poughkeepsie, Rhinebeck) – Erie (Buffalo) – Essex – Franklin – Fulton – Genesee – Greene – Hamilton – Herkimer – Jefferson – Kings – Lewis – Livingston – Madison – Monroe (Rochester) – Montgomery – Nassau – New York (Below 14th Street, 14th to 59th Streets, 59th to 110th Streets, Above 110th Street, Islands) – Niagara (Niagara Falls) – Oneida – Onondaga (Syracuse) – Ontario – Orange – Orleans – Oswego – Otsego – Putnam – Queens – Rensselaer – Richmond – Rockland – St. Lawrence – Saratoga – Schenectady – Schoharie – Schuyler – Seneca – Steuben – Suffolk – Sullivan – Tioga – Tompkins – Ulster – Warren – Washington – Wayne – Westchester (Northern, Southern, New Rochelle, Peekskill, Yonkers) – Wyoming – Yates

== Listings county-wide ==
	Name on the Register	Image	Date listed	Location	City or town	Description
1	John J. Aiken House	John J. Aiken House	February 20, 2013 (#13000025)	6805 Poverty Hill Rd. 42°18′00″N 78°41′01″W	Ellicottville	
2	Allegany Council House	Allegany Council House	October 27, 2017 (#100001768)	8156 Old State Route 17; 42°09′33″N 78°45′35″W	Jimerson Town	
3	Bank of Gowanda	Bank of Gowanda	May 25, 2001 (#01000553)	8 W. Main St. 42°27′45″N 78°56′10″W	Gowanda	
4	Beardsley-Oliver House	Beardsley-Oliver House	February 28, 2008 (#08000097)	312 Laurel Ave. 42°04′42″N 78°25′36″W	Olean	
5	Bedford Corners Historic District	Bedford Corners Historic District	July 5, 2003 (#03000590)	NY 305 at Deer Creek and Dodge Creek Rds. 42°03′14″N 78°18′38″W	Portville	
6	Bryant Hill Cemetery	Bryant Hill Cemetery	July 5, 2003 (#03000605)	Bryant Hill Rd. near Crane Rd. 42°18′19″N 78°36′07″W	Ellicottville	
7	Cattaraugus County Memorial and Historical Building		May 12, 2025 (#100011780)	302 Court Street; 42°15′06″N 78°48′04″W	Little Valley	
8	Cattaraugus Village Commercial Historic District	Cattaraugus Village Commercial Historic District	January 15, 2014 (#13001113)	9-52 Main, 1-17 Washington, 14 Waverly Sts. 42°19′47″N 78°52′04″W	Cattaraugus	Core of small village
9	Conklin Mountain House	Conklin Mountain House	November 19, 1998 (#98001386)	304 E. State St. 42°04′38″N 78°25′33″W	Olean	
10	East Otto Union School	East Otto Union School	September 15, 2004 (#04000993)	9014 East Otto-Springville Rd. 42°23′28″N 78°45′16″W	East Otto	
11	Ellicottville Historic District	Ellicottville Historic District	August 22, 1991 (#91001028)	Roughly bounded by Elizabeth, Monroe, Martha and Adams Sts. 42°16′30″N 78°40′24″W	Ellicottville	
12	Ellicottville Town Hall	Ellicottville Town Hall	April 3, 1973 (#73001166)	Village Sq., NW corner of Washington and Jefferson Sts. 42°16′31″N 78°40′25″W	Ellicottville	
13	First Congregational Church of Otto	First Congregational Church of Otto	February 12, 1999 (#99000194)	9019 Main St. 42°21′19″N 78°49′40″W	Otto	
14	Gladden Windmill	Gladden Windmill	July 16, 1973 (#73001167)	Pigeon Valley Rd. 42°14′07″N 78°53′44″W	Napoli	
15	Gowanda Village Historic District	Gowanda Village Historic District	September 22, 1986 (#86002691)	37, 39, 41-45, 47-49, and 53 W. Main St. 42°27′47″N 78°56′12″W	Gowanda	
16	House at 520 Hostageh Road	House at 520 Hostageh Road	February 20, 2009 (#09000038)	520 Ho-Sta-Geh Road; 42°00′53″N 78°28′17″W	Rock City	
17	Jefferson Street Cemetery	Jefferson Street Cemetery	January 4, 2012 (#11000994)	East side of Jefferson St. between Martha St. & Aspen Dr. 42°16′13″N 78°40′07″W	Ellicottville	
18	Kimble-Nellé House		June 16, 2021 (#100006643)	57 North Chapel St. 42°27′51″N 78°56′20″W	Gowanda	
19	Leon Grange No. 795	Leon Grange No. 795	January 15, 2014 (#13001089)	US 62 near Leon–New Albion Rd. 42°17′38″N 79°01′00″W	Leon	
20	Leon United Methodist Church	Leon United Methodist Church	November 22, 2000 (#00001413)	Junction of Cattaraugus Co. 6 and U.S. Route 62; 42°17′36″N 79°01′03″W	Leon	
21	North Lyndon Schoolhouse	North Lyndon Schoolhouse	September 15, 2000 (#00000571)	7617 North Center Rd. 42°19′51″N 78°21′16″W	Lyndon	
22	Oak Hill Park Historic District	Oak Hill Park Historic District	December 1, 1997 (#97001495)	Roughly along Laurens, N. Second, Third, Fourth, and W. Sullivan Sts. 42°04′50″N 78°26′04″W	Olean	
23	Olean Armory	Olean Armory	March 2, 1995 (#95000080)	119 Times Sq. 42°04′41″N 78°25′43″W	Olean	
24	Olean Public Library	Olean Public Library	July 11, 1985 (#85001498)	116 S. Union St. 42°04′36″N 78°25′50″W	Olean	
25	Olean School No. 10	Olean School No. 10	October 1, 2010 (#10000810)	411 W. Henley St. 42°04′32″N 78°26′04″W	Olean	
26	Park Square Historic District	Park Square Historic District	September 22, 1986 (#86002719)	Park Square roughly bounded by N. Main, Pine, Chestnut, S. Main, Elm, and Church Sts. 42°20′14″N 78°27′27″W	Franklinville	
27	Pfeiffer-Wheeler American Chestnut Cabin	Pfeiffer-Wheeler American Chestnut Cabin	January 11, 2002 (#01001436)	Lillibridge Rd. 42°05′34″N 78°19′29″W	Portville	
28	Portville Free Library	Portville Free Library	November 7, 1991 (#91001671)	2 N. Main St. 42°02′20″N 78°20′25″W	Portville	
29	Randolph Historic District	Randolph Historic District	December 12, 2012 (#12001035)	Junction of Main & Jamestown to Borden Sts. 42°09′49″N 78°58′50″W	Randolph	
30	Simeon B. Robbins House	Simeon B. Robbins House	March 7, 2003 (#03000091)	9 Pine St. 42°20′16″N 78°27′23″W	Franklinville	
31	St. Stephen's Episcopal Church Complex	St. Stephen's Episcopal Church Complex	January 26, 2001 (#00001684)	109 S. Barry St. 42°04′36″N 78°25′40″W	Olean	
32	Salem Welsh Church	Salem Welsh Church	September 7, 1995 (#95001065)	11141 NY 98 at junction with Galen Hill Rd. 42°29′12″N 78°21′31″W	Freedom	
33	Temple B'Nai Israel	Temple B'Nai Israel	January 4, 2012 (#11000995)	127 S. Barry St. 42°04′35″N 78°25′39″W	Olean	
34	Union and State Streets Historic District	Union and State Streets Historic District	May 21, 2015 (#15000265)	Roughly 101-133 N. Union, 110-114, 116 W. State & 102, 116, 120 S. Union Sts. 42°04′40″N 78°25′59″W	Olean	Intact core of downtown commercial area, with buildings from post-Civil War era to pre-World War II
35	US Post Office-Little Valley	US Post Office-Little Valley	May 11, 1989 (#88002344)	115 Main St. 42°14′57″N 78°47′55″W	Little Valley	
36	US Post Office-Olean	US Post Office-Olean	May 11, 1989 (#88002388)	102 S. Union St. 42°04′37″N 78°25′50″W	Olean	
37	William E. Wheeler House	William E. Wheeler House	January 11, 2002 (#01001435)	29 Maple Ave. 42°02′26″N 78°20′21″W	Portville	
