= Park Square Historic District =

Park Square Historic District may refer to:

- Park Square Historic District (Pittsfield, Massachusetts)
- Park Square Historic District (Franklinville, New York)
