= Wilson Thomas Hogue =

American bishop

Wilson Thomas Hogue (1852–1920) was an American bishop of the Free Methodist Church, elected in 1903. He was born 6 March 1852 in Lyndon, New York. His parents were Scottish-English Methodists. His father was a class meeting leader in the Methodist Episcopal Church. Hogue was converted to the Christian faith at the age of nine, and felt called to preach at eleven. Nevertheless, he did not yield to this call until sixteen. He joined the Genesee Annual Conference of the Free Methodist Church in 1873 and was ordained by Bishops Roberts and Hart. He was the founder of Greenville College. His career also included service as a Pastor and a District Elder.

Hogue's health failed in 1919. He died 13 February 1920 in Michigan City, Indiana. He was buried in Franklinville, New York.

== Publications ==
- A Handbook of Homiletics and Pastoral Theology. 2nd edition. Free Methodist Publishing House, Chicago, IL, and Winona Lake, IN, 1949.
- Hymns That Are Immortal. S.K.J. Chesbro agent, Free Methodist Publishing House, Chicago, IL, 1906.
- G. Harry Agnew: A Pioneer Missionary. Chicago, IL.
- The Class Meeting as a Means of Grace. W. B. Rose, Chicago, IL, 1916.
- The Holy Spirit: a Study. W. B. Rose, Chicago, IL, 1916.

== Biographies ==
- Blews, R.R., Master Workmen, 1939.
