= Ellicottville Historic District =

Historic district in New York, United States

- U.S. National Register of Historic Places
- U.S. Historic district
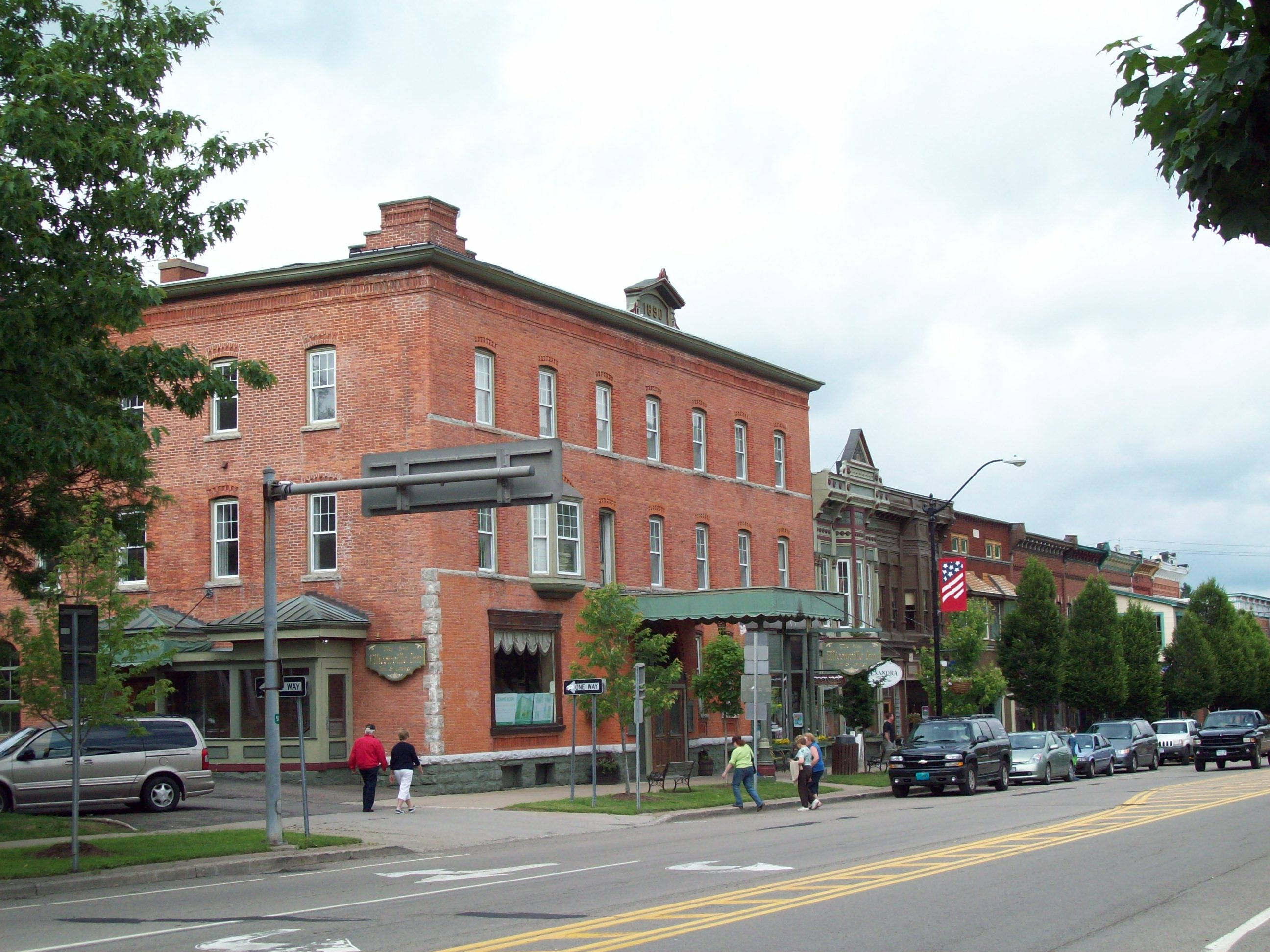
- Ellicottville Historic District, June 2009

- Location within New York Location within the United States
- Location: Roughly bounded by Elizabeth, Monroe, Martha and Adams Sts., Ellicottville, New York
- Coordinates: 42°16′29″N 78°40′26″W
- Built: 1817
- Architectural style: Greek Revival, Queen Anne, Federal
- NRHP reference No.: 91001028
- Added to NRHP: August 22, 1991

Ellicottville Historic District is a historic district located at Ellicottville in Cattaraugus County, New York. The district encompasses the historic core of the village of Ellicottville with structures associated with the civic, commercial, religious, educational, and residential life of the village between 1817 and 1935. The structures reflect a variety of 19th-century and early 20th-century architectural styles including Queen Anne, Federal, and Greek Revival styles. The district contains 63 contributing and 3 non-contributing structures. Located within the district is the Ellicottville Town Hall.

It was listed on the National Register of Historic Places in 1991.
