= Continental Charters Flight 44-2 =

1951 aviation accident

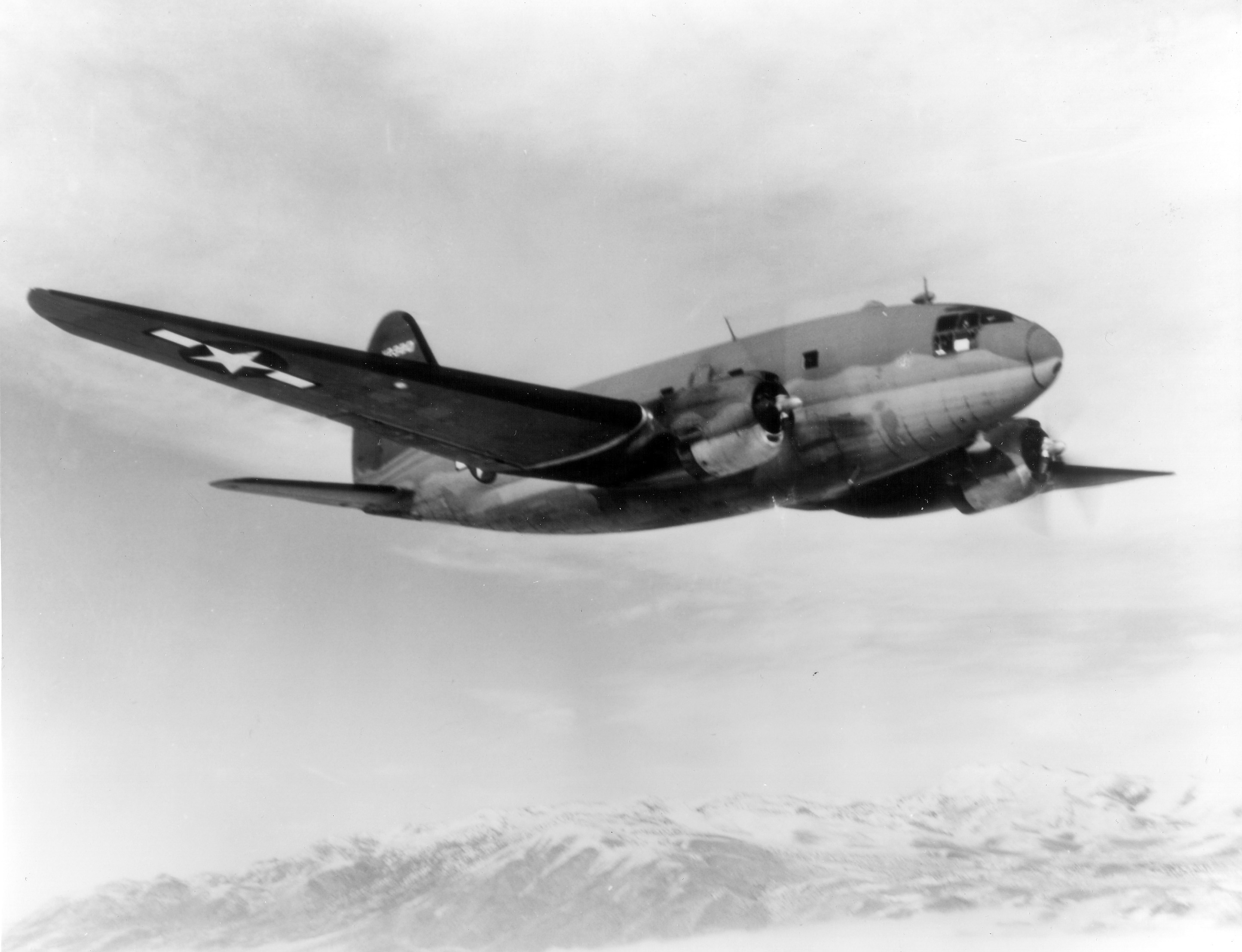
- Military C-46 similar to the plane that crashed

Accident
- Date: December 29, 1951
- Summary: Controlled flight into terrain (CFIT)
- Site: Bucktooth Ridge, near Napoli, New York; 42.175°N 78.817°W

Aircraft
- Aircraft type: Curtiss C-46 Commando
- Operator: Continental Charters Inc
- Registration: N3944C
- Flight origin: Miami, Florida
- Stopover: Pittsburgh, Pennsylvania
- Destination: Buffalo, New York
- Occupants: 40
- Passengers: 36
- Crew: 4
- Fatalities: 26
- Injuries: 14
- Survivors: 14

Continental Charters Flight 44-2, a domestic non scheduled passenger flight from Miami, Florida to Buffalo, New York, crashed on December 29, 1951 near Napoli, New York. The twin engine C-46 Commando, registration N3944C, crashed approximately 10:25 pm in adverse weather conditions. Of the four crew and 36 passengers on board, three crew members and 23 passengers perished. The flight crew's poor judgment in attempting a flight by visual reference during instrument weather conditions was the cause of the accident.

== Pre-accident narrative ==
Continental Charters (no connection to the former Continental Airlines) Flight 44-2 originated in Miami, Florida where the airline was based. Continental Charters operated without a regular schedule and was equipped with military surplus aircraft, allowing the company to offer discounted fares. After a seven-hour delay due to mechanical problems, Flight 44-2 departed Miami and arrived safely but late into Pittsburgh's Allegheny County Airport. The flight carried a crew of four, 24 passengers bound for Pittsburgh, and a backup crew of three who were to fly the plane back to Miami. The plan was to stop in Pittsburgh, deplane the 24 passengers, then go to Buffalo, return to Pittsburgh, and then return to Miami. The crew opted to board 29 passengers waiting in Pittsburgh for the flight to Miami, fly to Buffalo and then return directly from Buffalo to Miami to make up lost time. The crew also opted to fly VFR direct to Buffalo from Pittsburgh instead of filing a flight plan under instrument flight rules that would take them in a less than direct route to Buffalo. Flying under instrument flight rules would also have required an additional delay for refueling in Pittsburgh. When the crew filed their VFR fight plan, they were advised that stations along the proposed route (Bradford, Pennsylvania and Jamestown, New York) were reporting ceilings and visibility below VFR minimums. The weather briefer further stated that VFR flight was not recommended over their intended route due to low ceilings and poor visibility.

== Accident flight ==
Continental Charters Flight 44-2 left Pittsburgh at 9:47 pm. The direct course to Buffalo (heading 018 degrees true) would take the flight slightly east of Jamestown, New York and into Buffalo. Reports of witnesses on the ground located by accident investigators after the crash indicated that the aircraft began drifting east of the direct route soon after takeoff. The plane was also reported to have been flying very low and that the weather was very poor, with zero ceiling and visibility along the route. The plane's flight path, miles east of the direct course, resulted in the aircraft flying over significantly higher terrain, the foothills of the Allegheny Mountains, than the flight would have encountered on the direct route.

The only surviving crew member, a flight attendant, later recounted that the two relief pilots went forward into the cockpit just before the crash. Loud discussion and cursing was heard among the pilots. Moments later, the crash sequence began.

== Crash scene ==
The crash sequence began about 38 minutes into the flight. The aircraft first struck the top of a tree 60 ft (18 m) above the ground located about 100 ft (30 m) below the top of wooded ridge. The ridge, called 'Bucktooth Ridge,' is 2,375 ft (724 m) in elevation. Forward movement continued for 933 ft (284 m) as the aircraft struck other trees and disintegrated from the impact. All major parts of the aircraft were accounted for. The only part of the aircraft that was not destroyed was the aft passenger compartment, which rolled to a stop at the far end of the debris field. All 14 survivors were seated in this section. There was no post crash fire. The aircraft was later written off as a total loss.

== Post crash survival ==
The ordeal had just begun for the survivors of Flight 44-2. The 14 survivors spent two days and two nights at the crash site in below freezing temperatures waiting to be rescued. Snow was chest high in the area. Two men tried to walk out to get help on the day after the crash but had to turn back. On the second day, one of the men was able to get to a farm house several miles away and get help. All 14 survivors had injuries of varying severity and were taken to hospital.

== Accident investigation ==
The crash was investigated by the Civil Aeronautics Board (CAB). The investigation found that the crew, the aircraft and the carrier were properly certified and that the aircraft was properly loaded and fueled. They found that there was no malfunction of the aircraft and the engines were operating properly. The investigation also found that the crew filed a VFR flight plan when instrument weather conditions prevailed over the proposed route and that flight was conducted below the prescribed minimum altitude for VFR night operations. The probable cause was determined to be "the captain's poor judgement in attempting a flight by visual reference during instrument weather conditions."

== Implications ==
The accident occurred just as passenger airline service was developing in the United States. To control public perceptions that air travel was unsafe, the CAB Chairman Donald Nyrop visited the crash scene on January 1, 1952 and reassured the public that the crash had not been caused by a mechanical failure of the airplane. The loss of Flight 44-2 also led to new airline safety rules. The CAB issued a draft regulation on March 10, 1952, requiring that night visual flights on passenger planes in large aircraft be conducted only on designated routes and between airports equipped with radio communications.

== See also ==
- Aviation accidents and incidents
- List of accidents and incidents involving airliners in the United States
- List of accidents and incidents involving commercial aircraft
