= United States Post Office (Olean, New York) =

- US Post Office--Olean
- U.S. National Register of Historic Places
- U.S. Historic district – Contributing property
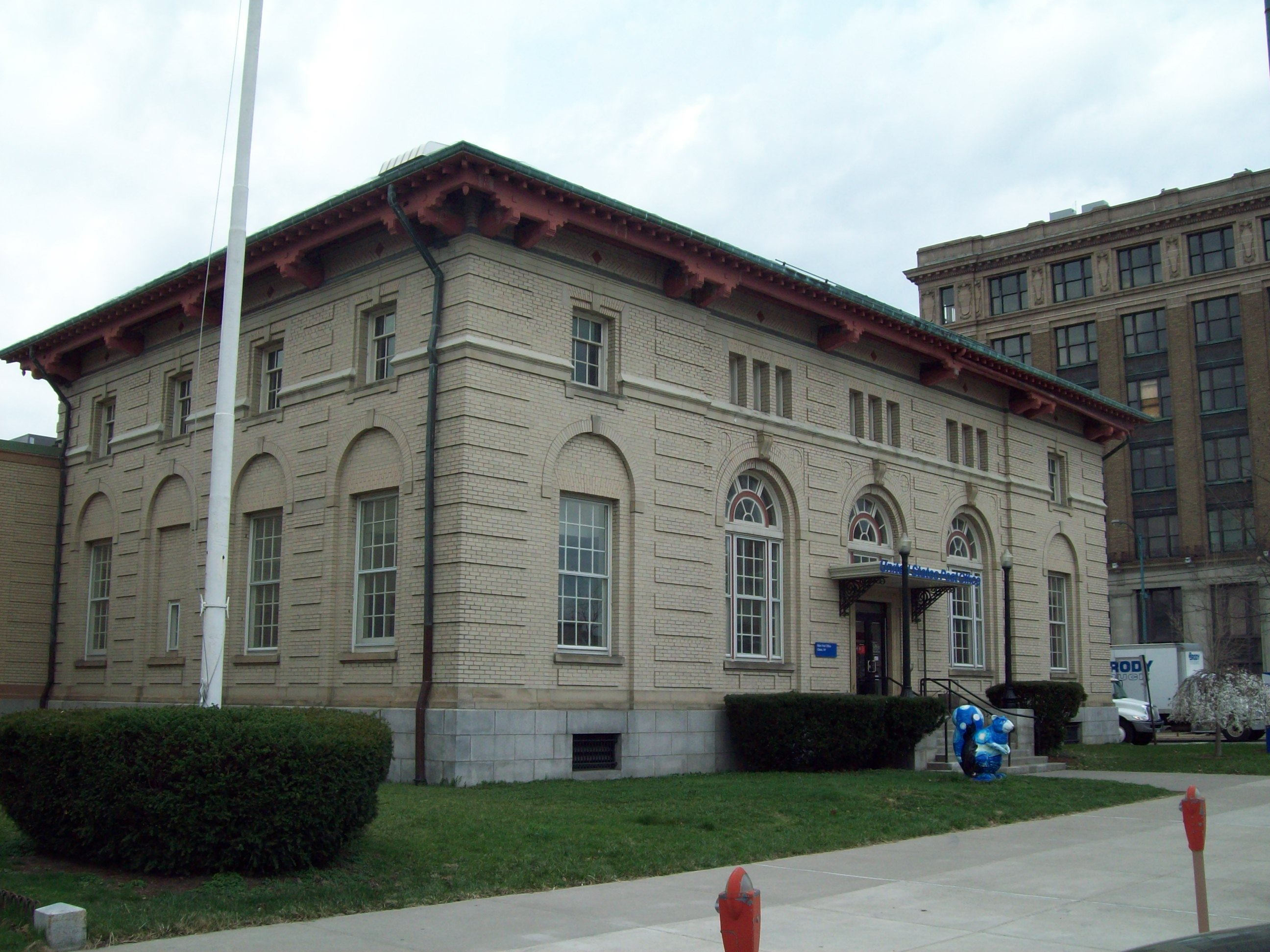
- US Post Office, Olean NY, April 2010

- Location within New York Location within the United States
- Location: 102 S. Union St., Olean, New York
- Coordinates: 42°4′37″N 78°25′50″W
- Built: 1910
- Architect: Taylor, James Knox; US Treasury Department
- Architectural style: Bungalow/Craftsman, Renaissance, Italian Renaissance
- MPS: US Post Offices in New York State, 1858-1943, TR
- NRHP reference No.: 88002388
- Added to NRHP: May 11, 1989

US Post Office—Olean is a historic post office building located at Olean in Cattaraugus County, New York. It was designed and built in 1910-12 and is one of a number of post offices in New York State designed by the Office of the Supervising Architect of the Treasury Department, James Knox Taylor. It is a two-story masonry and steel frame building. Its Renaissance Revival design complements the adjacent Olean Public Library.

It was listed on the National Register of Historic Places in 1989. It is located in the Union and State Streets Historic District.
