= Andrew Jackson Merchant =

American Methodist minister

Andrew Jackson Merchant (December 23, 1831 – November 20, 1899) was an American Methodist minister.

Merchant was born on his father's farm in Napoli, New York, on December 23, 1831. He was the grandson of Truman Merchant, a Revolutionary War soldier and cousin of Vice-President Aaron Burr, and was descended from Captain John Marchant, who died along with Sir Francis Drake in his 1595 campaign.

A teacher in his early years, Andrew Merchant enrolled in the first class at Allegheny College in Meadville, Pennsylvania, and graduated in 1857 with Latin Honors. He married Frances C. Peck that same year, and was admitted into the Erie Conference as a Methodist preacher. A so-called "circuit rider," he preached in many locales across western Pennsylvania, southwestern New York State, and northern Ohio, including charges in Punxsutawney, Cleveland, and Meadville, where he died November 20, 1899.

Rev. Merchant sat on the Board of Control of Allegheny College, was a presiding elder and delegate to the General Conference of the Methodist Church in 1896, and served as treasurer of the Erie Conference Educational Association.

He was the father of Frank W. Merchant, a noted newspaperman in Pittsburgh between 1898 and 1931.
