= Lyndon, New York =

- Town
- Location within New York Location within the United States
- Coordinates: 42°18′7″N 78°21′56″W
- Country: United States
- State: New York
- County: Cattaraugus

Area
  - Total: 33.27 sq mi (86.16 km^{2})
  - Land: 33.23 sq mi (86.07 km^{2})
  - Water: 0.035 sq mi (0.09 km^{2})
- Elevation: 1,978 ft (603 m)

Population (2020)
  - Total: 686
  - Estimate (2021): 683
  - Density: 20.5/sq mi (7.92/km^{2})
- Time zone: UTC-5 (Eastern (EST))
  - Summer (DST): UTC-4 (EDT)
- ZIP Codes: 14727 (Cuba); 14737 (Franklinville)
- FIPS code: 36-009-43896
- GNIS feature ID: 0979174
- Website: lyndontown.org

Lyndon is a town in Cattaraugus County, New York, United States. The population was 686 at the 2020 census. The town is on the east border of the county and is north of Olean.

== History ==
The area that would become the town was first settled circa 1806. The town of Lyndon was founded in 1829, formed from the town of Franklinville. The town was briefly called "Elgin" around 1857.

In 1875, the population of Lyndon was 805.

The North Lyndon Schoolhouse is listed on the National Register of Historic Places.

== Geography ==
According to the United States Census Bureau, the town has a total area of 33.3 square miles (86.2 km^{2}), of which 33.2 square miles (86.1 km^{2}) is land and 0.04 square miles (0.1 km^{2}), or 0.11%, is water.

The eastern town line is the border of Allegany County.

=== Adjacent towns and areas ===
The town of New Hudson in Allegany County is to the east. The north town line is shared by the town of Farmersville, and the south town line is shared with the town of Ischua. The town of Franklinville is west of Lyndon.

== Demographics ==
Historical population
Census	Pop.	Note	%±
1830	271		—
1840	628		131.7%
1850	1,092		73.9%
1860	1,161		6.3%
1870	894		−23.0%
1880	831		−7.0%
1890	677		−18.5%
1900	690		1.9%
1910	603		−12.6%
1920	567		−6.0%
1930	463		−18.3%
1940	391		−15.6%
1950	409		4.6%
1960	406		−0.7%
1970	339		−16.5%
1980	610		79.9%
1990	503		−17.5%
2000	661		31.4%
2010	707		7.0%
2020	686		−3.0%
2021 (est.)	683		−0.4%
U.S. Decennial Census

At the 2000 census, there were 661 people, 250 households and 187 families residing in the town. The population density was 19.9 inhabitants per square mile (7.7/km^{2}). There were 639 housing units at an average density of 19.2 per square mile (7.4/km^{2}). The racial makeup of the town was 97.28% White, 0.61% African American, 1.21% Native American, and 0.91% from two or more races. Hispanic or Latino of any race were 0.76% of the population.

There were 250 households, of which 33.2% had children under the age of 18 living with them, 60.0% were married couples living together, 7.2% had a female householder with no husband present, and 25.2% were non-families. 18.0% of all households were made up of individuals, and 7.6% had someone living alone who was 65 years of age or older. The average household size was 2.64 and the average family size was 2.98.

Age distribution was 27.7% under the age of 18, 6.2% from 18 to 24, 30.6% from 25 to 44, 25.3% from 45 to 64, and 10.3% who were 65 years of age or older. The median age was 39 years. For every 100 females, there were 101.5 males. For every 100 females age 18 and over, there were 110.6 males.

The median household income was $34,091, and the median family income was $37,361. Males had a median income of $29,063 versus $22,250 for females. The per capita income for the town was $15,054. About 6.7% of families and 12.6% of the population were below the poverty line, including 14.3% of those under age 18 and none of those age 65 or over.

== Notable person ==
- Wilson Thomas Hogue, former bishop of the Free Methodist Church

== Communities and locations in Lyndon ==
- Elgin – A hamlet in the center of the town on County Road 47 (Lyndon Center Road).
- Gates Creek – A stream flowing out the west town line.
- Oil Creek – A stream by the east town line.
- Rawson – A hamlet on the east town line on County Road 7A (Rawson Road).
