= Nannen Arboretum =

Arboretum and botanical garden in Ellicottville, New York

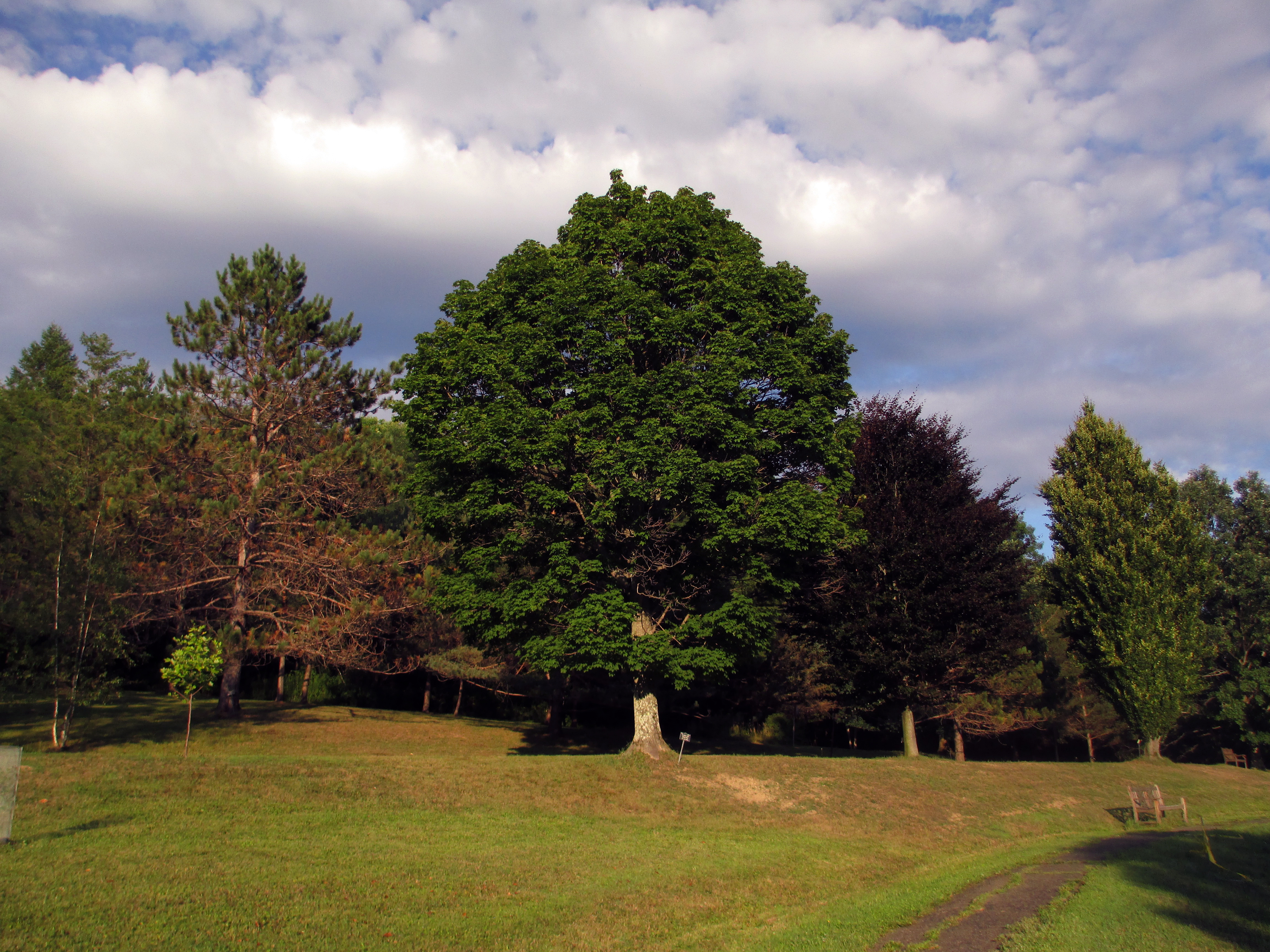
- Nannen Arboretum in August 2016

- Location within New York
- Type: Arboretum
- Location: 28 Parkside Drive; Ellicottville, New York
- Coordinates: 42°16′59″N 78°40′15″W
- Operator: Town of Ellicottville
- Website: www.nannenarboretum.com

The Nannen Arboretum is an eight-acre (3.2 ha) arboretum and botanical garden located at 28 Parkside Drive, Ellicottville, New York. It is nonprofit and open to the public.

The arboretum was organized in 1976 and contains over 250 species of trees, shrubs, flowers, and herbs. It includes several Japanese gardens, a pond with fish, a large herb garden, and nature walks. The Nannen Arboretum was affiliated with the Cornell Cooperative Extension prior to 2013, at which time the arboretum was transferred to the Town of Ellicottville.

== See also ==
- List of botanical gardens in the United States
