= Napoli, New York =

- Town
- Location within New York Location within the United States
- Coordinates: 42°13′10″N 78°53′43″W
- Country: United States
- State: New York
- County: Cattaraugus

Government
  - Type: Town Council
  - Town Supervisor: Daniel T. Martonis (R)
  - Town Council: Members' List: • Dave Dechow (R, R); • Jeff Stacey (R); • John Adams (R); • Harold Spangler (R, R)

Area
  - Total: 36.54 sq mi (94.65 km^{2})
  - Land: 36.37 sq mi (94.21 km^{2})
  - Water: 0.17 sq mi (0.44 km^{2})
- Elevation: 1,860 ft (567 m)

Population (2020)
  - Total: 1,173
  - Estimate (2021): 1,189
  - Density: 35.8/sq mi (13.82/km^{2})
- Time zone: UTC-5 (Eastern (EST))
  - Summer (DST): UTC-4 (EDT)
- ZIP Codes: 14719 (Cattaraugus); 14755 (Little Valley); 14772 (Randolph)
- FIPS code: 36-009-49462
- GNIS feature ID: 0979249
- Website: napoliny.org

Napoli is a town in Cattaraugus County, New York, United States. It is located in the western half of the county, northwest of Salamanca. The only permanent community in the town is Napoli village, formerly "Napoli Corners". The population was 1,173 at the 2020 census.

The town's name presumably comes from Napoli, the Italian name of Naples, but is pronounced with a non-Italian pronunciation: /nəˈpoʊlaɪ/ nə-POH-ly, with a long "i" sound at the end (much like communities named Pulaski and Chili in other parts of the state).

== History ==
The first permanent White settler arrived circa 1819. The town of Napoli was formed in 1823 from part of the town of Little Valley. In 1828, a division of Napoli was made, forming the new town of Coldspring to the south.

Continental Charters Flight 44-2 crashed in Napoli on December 26, 1951.

The now-dismantled Gladden Windmill is listed on the National Register of Historic Places.

== Geography ==
According to the United States Census Bureau, the town has a total area of 36.6 square miles (94.7 km^{2}), of which 36.4 square miles (94.2 km^{2}) is land and 0.15 square miles (0.4 km^{2}), or 0.46%, is water.

New York State Route 242 is a northeast–southwest major highway in the town. County Route 7 (Pigeon Valley Road) moves from east to west across the northern part of the town; County Route 10 (Hardscrabble Road / Farm to Market Road) runs north to south through the middle of the town.

=== Adjacent towns and areas ===
(Clockwise)

- New Albion
- Little Valley; Salamanca
- Coldspring
- Conewango

== Demographics ==
Historical population
Census	Pop.	Note	%±
1830	852		—
1840	1,145		34.4%
1850	1,233		7.7%
1860	1,238		0.4%
1870	1,174		−5.2%
1880	1,126		−4.1%
1890	962		−14.6%
1900	967		0.5%
1910	741		−23.4%
1920	636		−14.2%
1930	578		−9.1%
1940	570		−1.4%
1950	619		8.6%
1960	670		8.2%
1970	778		16.1%
1980	886		13.9%
1990	1,102		24.4%
2000	1,159		5.2%
2010	1,248		7.7%
2020	1,173		−6.0%
2021 (est.)	1,189		1.4%
U.S. Decennial Census

As of the census of 2000, there were 1,159 people, 376 households, and 292 families residing in the town. The population density was 31.8 inhabitants per square mile (12.3/km^{2}). There were 541 housing units at an average density of 14.9 per square mile (5.8/km^{2}). The racial makeup of the town was 96.46% White, 0.43% African American, 1.38% Native American, 0.86% Asian, and 0.86% from two or more races. Hispanic or Latino of any race were 0.26% of the population.

There were 376 households, out of which 36.2% had children under the age of 18 living with them, 68.1% were married couples living together, 5.9% had a female householder with no husband present, and 22.1% were non-families. 17.6% of all households were made up of individuals, and 5.3% had someone living alone who was 65 years of age or older. The average household size was 3.06 and the average family size was 3.43.

In the town, the population was spread out, with 32.3% under the age of 18, 7.0% from 18 to 24, 26.3% from 25 to 44, 23.7% from 45 to 64, and 10.7% who were 65 years of age or older. The median age was 35 years. For every 100 females, there were 106.2 males. For every 100 females age 18 and over, there were 109.9 males.

The median income for a household in the town was $33,839, and the median income for a family was $37,692. Males had a median income of $26,411 versus $23,036 for females. The per capita income for the town was $13,077. About 9.3% of families and 20.1% of the population were below the poverty line, including 32.1% of those under age 18 and 9.5% of those age 65 or over.

== Attractions ==
Napoli, like much of western Cattaraugus County, has a sizable Amish community, particularly to the north and west of the hamlet of Napoli. The presence of the Amish and their corresponding large families and high birth rates has ensured that Napoli is one of the few communities in the region that has consistently risen in population since the late 20th century.

Despite a comparable population to other towns and villages in the area, Napoli has a relatively small number of businesses and attractions other than those operated from the Amish farms, with most town residents going to Little Valley or Randolph for their needs. The only church in Napoli is a United Methodist Church in the hamlet.

Public school residents attend either Randolph Central School or Cattaraugus-Little Valley Central School. The Amish operate a small one-room elementary school on Hoxie Hill in the western part of town.

== Notable people ==
- Cyrus G. Baldwin (1852-1931), Congregationalist minister and first president of Pomona College
- Andrew Jackson Merchant (1831-1899), former Methodist minister

== Communities and locations ==
- Cold Spring – A location in the northwest part of the town near the intersection of County Roads 7 and 10. (Not to be confused with the town of the same name, which neighbors to the south of Napoli.)
- Cold Springs Creek – A stream flowing southward on the west side of the town.
- Enchanted Lake – A defunct subdivision that was started in the early 1970s. It is now a Nature Center - https://www.zaepfelcenter.com/. The history of the subdivision can be found on this website.
- Napoli – The hamlet of Napoli is near the center of the town at the intersection of NY Route 242 and County Road 10.
- The Narrows – A location in the eastern part of the town on Route 242. This marks the route of an early road cut into the town.
- Peaslee Hollow – A location in the northwest part of the town.
- Seelysburgh/Elm Creek – A former hamlet in the western part of town; formerly the site of a 19th-century post office.
