= Gladden Windmill =

- U.S. National Register of Historic Places
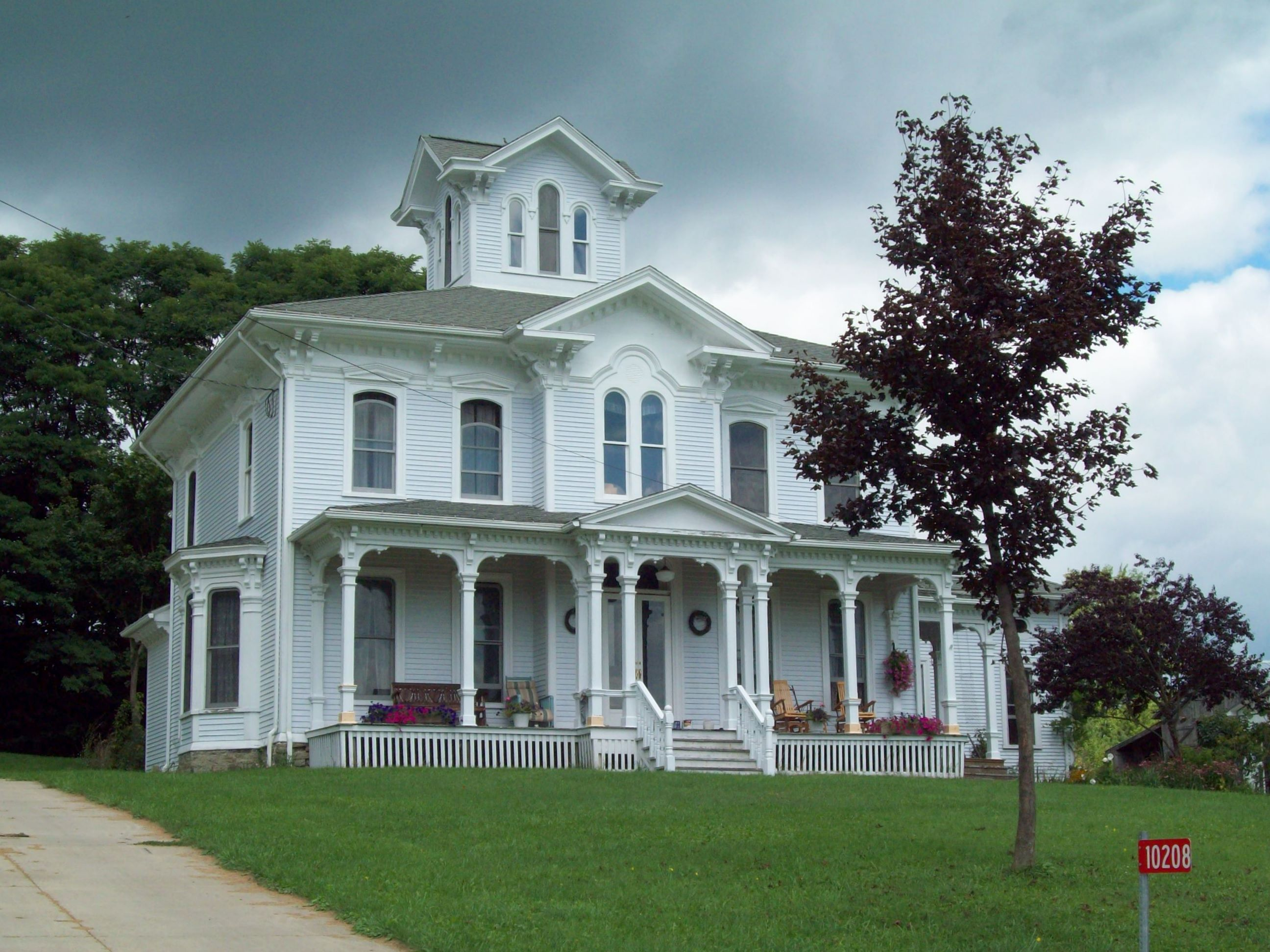
- Home at Gladden Windmill site, August 2010

- Location within New York Location within the United States
- Location: Napoli, New York, USA
- Coordinates: 42°14′7″N 78°53′44″W
- Built: 1890
- Architect: George Gladden
- NRHP reference No.: 73001167
- Added to NRHP: July 16, 1973

Gladden Windmill is an historic windmill formerly located on Pigeon Valley Road in Napoli, Cattaraugus County, New York. The windmill was built in 1890 and is a well-preserved example of a vertical wind turbine built during the 19th century. Although no longer operational, the turbine (and associated mill structure) is a rare example of wind power technology in the United States.

== Turbine driven gristmill ==
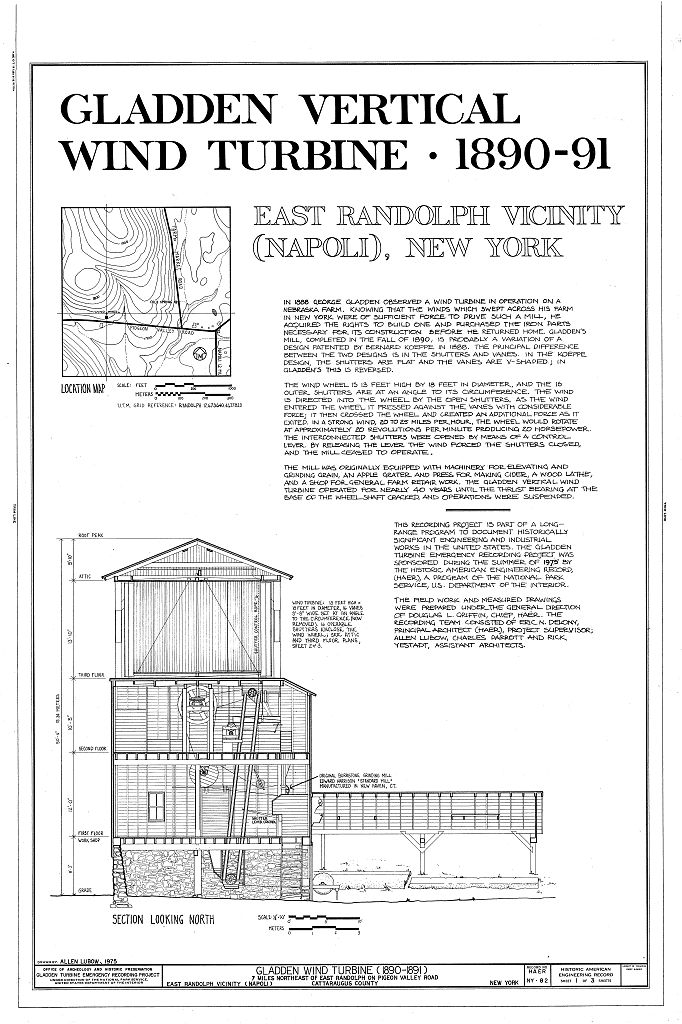
Gladden Wind Turbine, Pigeon Valley Road, Napoli, Cattaraugus County, NY HAER NY,5-NAP,1- sheet 1 of 3

The four-story structure, a unique design built of wood on a stone foundation, housed the mill machinery in the three floors that were under the twenty-four-foot-square (7.3 m) turbine room, which had shutters to direct wind. An extension porch and the wind wheel is covered by gable roofs. The exterior walls were asphalt shingles and board siding. The vanes of the turbine were removed and used as siding in a nearby barn. The wheel itself was eighteen feet (5.5 m) across by thirteen feet (4.0 m) high. Each vane was three feet eight inches (1.12 m) high. Beneath the windmill the roof is covered in heavy tin that is soldered at the joints and corners. The entirety rests on eighty-eight-foot-long (27 m) hemlock beams. The mill employed a grain elevator and the gears were iron. Gladden, a farmer, was interested after seeing a similar mill in Lincoln, Nebraska, which was officially recorded in the U.S. Patent Office on March 19, 1888, as patent No. 387,424, awarded to Bernard Koeppe. George Gladden's was a larger version, with sixteen vanes instead of eight. He incorporated an apple grater, a cider press, and a lathe, and the grist mill was a Standard Mill manufactured by Harrisons of New Haven, Connecticut. In good wind, 20–25 miles per hour (32–40 km/h), he realized twenty horsepower (15 kW) from the mill.

== Operation ==
The mill and attached farm tool repair shop operated for 40 years until a thrust bearing failed; as a result the operations were suspended. In 1973 the NPS sponsored The Gladden Turbine Emergency Recording Project, which deconstructed the mill engineering.

It was listed on the National Register of Historic Places in 1973. Since its listing, the windmill has been dismantled and moved to Conewango, New York.
