= East Otto Union School =

- U.S. National Register of Historic Places
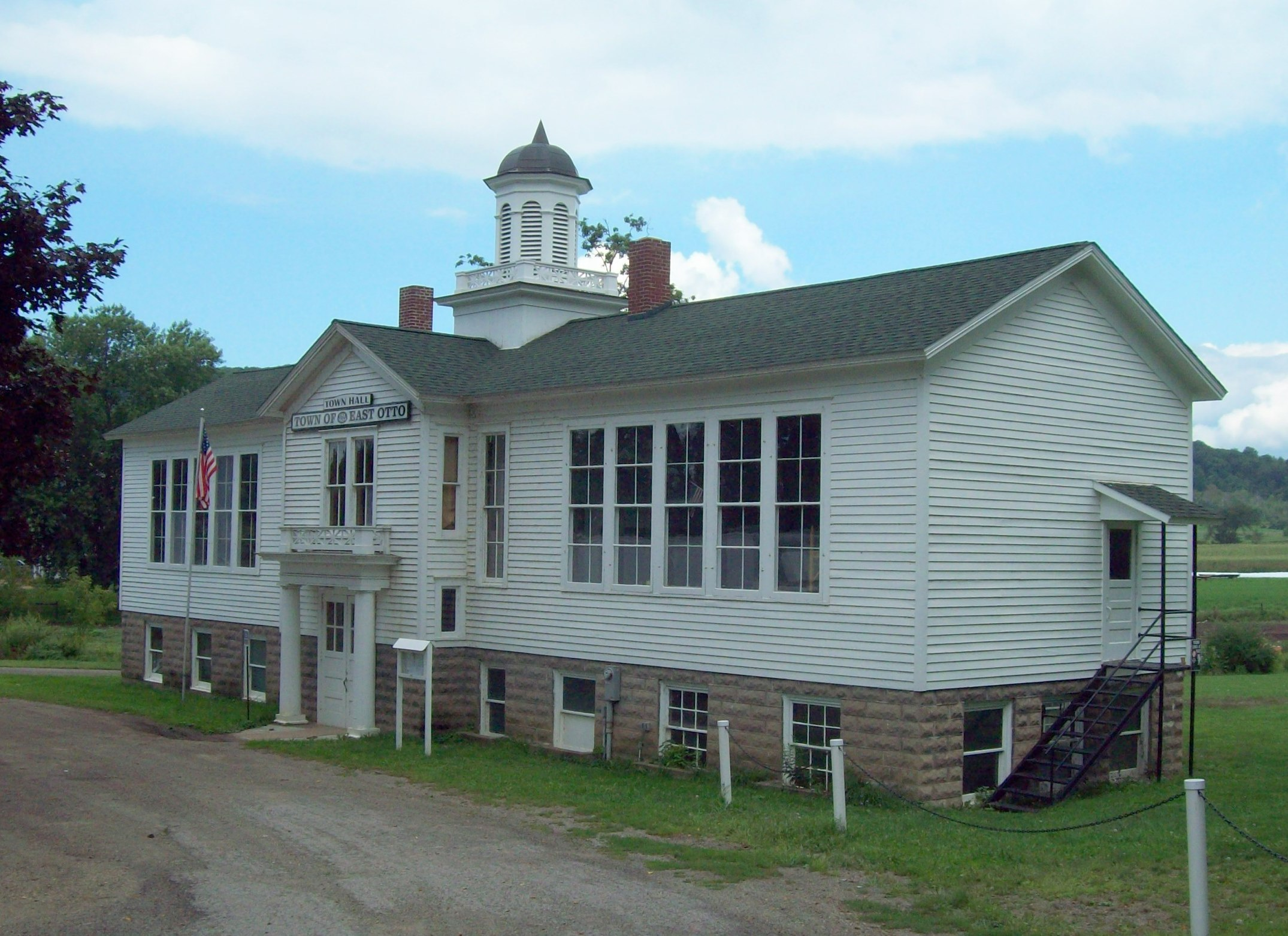
- East Otto Union School, August 2010

- Location within New York Location within the United States
- Location: 9014 East Otto--Springville Rd., East Otto, New York
- Coordinates: 42°23′28″N 78°45′17″W
- Built: 1920
- Architectural style: Colonial Revival
- NRHP reference No.: 04000993
- Added to NRHP: September 15, 2004

East Otto Union School is a historic school building located at East Otto in Cattaraugus County, New York. It was built in 1920, and functioned as a local high school from 1921 to the 1950s, after which the school was merged into the Cattaraugus Central School (now Cattaraugus-Little Valley Central School) 12 miles to the southwest. It is a Colonial Revival style frame building that features a distinctive cupola. Since 1972, the structure has served as town hall for the town of East Otto, New York.

It was listed on the National Register of Historic Places in 2004.
