= Ellicottville (village), New York =

Ellicottville, New York
- Village
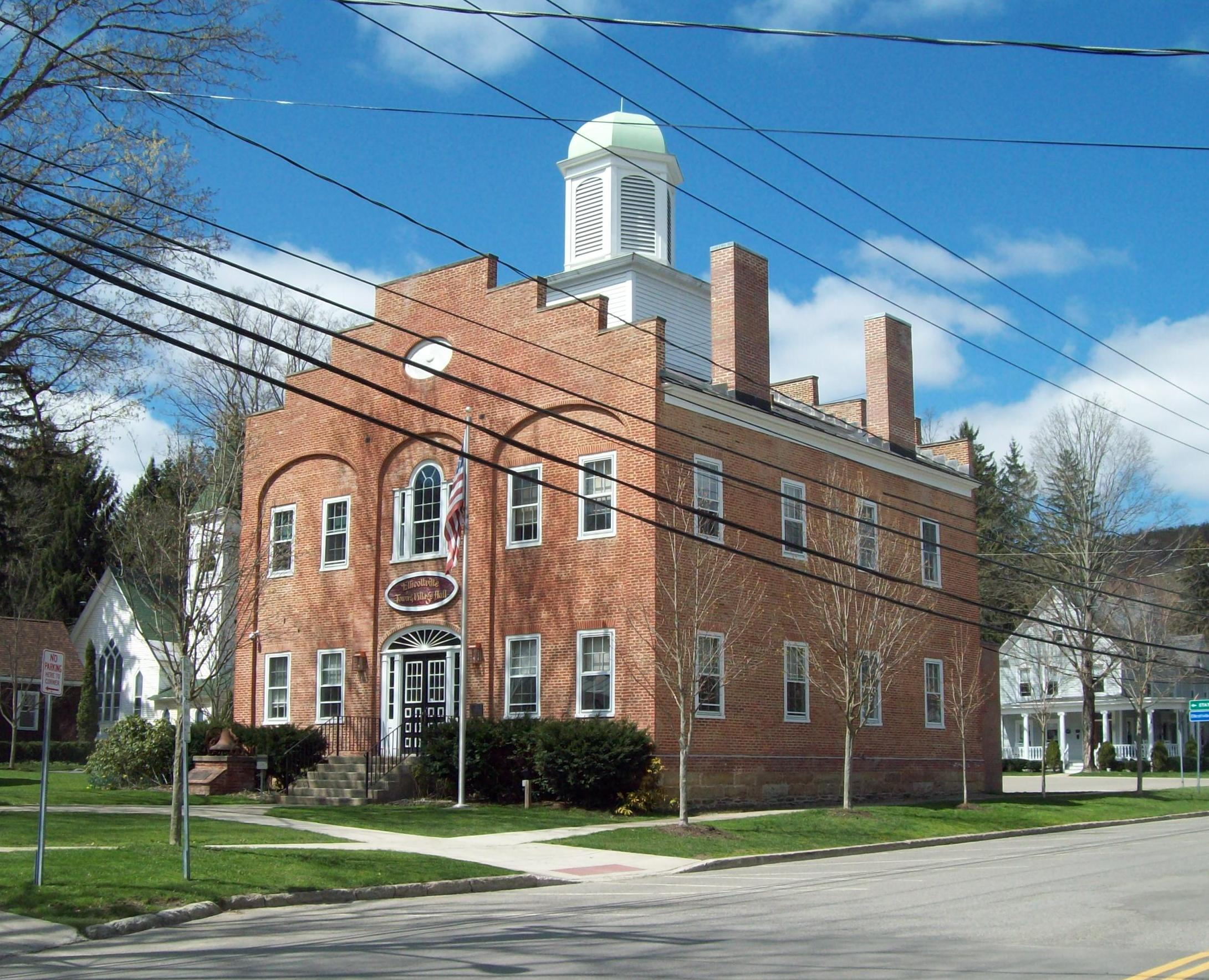
- Ellicottville Town Hall, April 2012

- Location within the state of New York
- Coordinates: 42°16′N 78°40′W
- Country: United States
- State: New York
- County: Cattaraugus
- Town: Ellicottville

Government
  - Mayor: John Burrell

Area
  - Total: 0.83 sq mi (2.16 km^{2})
  - Land: 0.82 sq mi (2.12 km^{2})
  - Water: 0.015 sq mi (0.04 km^{2})
- Elevation: 1,549 ft (472 m)

Population (2020)
  - Total: 256
  - Density: 312/sq mi (120.5/km^{2})
- Time zone: UTC-5 (Eastern (EST))
  - Summer (DST): UTC-4 (EDT)
- ZIP code: 14731
- Area code: 716
- FIPS code: 36-24020
- GNIS feature ID: 0949515
- Website: www.villageofellicottvilleny.gov

Ellicottville is a village in Cattaraugus County, New York, United States. The population was 284 at the 2020 census. The village is named after Joseph Ellicott, principal land agent of the Holland Land Company. It lies in the southwest part of the town of Ellicottville and is north of the city of Salamanca.

== History ==
The Seneca name for this location was De-as-hen-da-qua, or "place for holding court".

The Holland Land Company opened an office in 1818. The community was the original county seat of Cattaraugus County in 1808, and public buildings were subsequently constructed.

The village of Ellicottville was incorporated in 1837. In 1868, the county seat was moved to the village of Little Valley.

The Ellicottville Historic District, Ellicottville Town Hall, and Jefferson Street Cemetery are listed on the National Register of Historic Places.

== Commerce ==
=== Ski slopes and tourism ===
The Holiday Valley ski resort is south of the village, and the Nannen Arboretum is north. Ellicottville is also home to the HoliMont Ski Club, the largest private ski club in North America. Because of the proximity to these two popular skiing destinations, Ellicottville is Cattaraugus County's primary tourist destination. Property values in the town and village of Ellicottville have gentrified rapidly and are, as a result, much higher than the rest of the county.

A major "Fall Festival" is held each year, coinciding with Canadian Thanksgiving weekend (most of Ellicottville's tourists come from Canada) and the peak of the leaf peeping season. Ellicottville has a large number of festivals throughout the year, including Mardi Gras (which, ironically, is always held during Lent), a "Rock'n'Oldies Weekend", a "Jazz and Blues Festival," and a "Taste of Ellicottville".

=== Other commerce ===
The village of Ellicottville has strict zoning regulations prohibiting most chain franchises from operating in the village; its central business district is occupied mostly by taverns, boutiques and various similar small businesses.

Two weekly newspapers are based in Ellicottville, Ellicottville Now and The Villager. The Villager dates to the mid-2000s. In addition to the weekly papers, a monthly tourism tabloid also originates in the village, which operates as Ellicottville Snowed-In during the winter and The Summer Local the rest of the year (its publisher also launched Ellicottville Now in 2020; that weekly paper is a spiritual successor to the Ellicottville Times and before that Special E-Fects, which dated as far back as 1992).

Louisville Slugger baseball bats were manufactured in Ellicottville for a number of years; after that company's departure, the factory building was converted into a bowling alley. Fitzpatrick & Weller, a wood products manufacturer, is the only currently operating factory in the village.

== Education ==
Public school students attend Ellicottville Central School, the campus of which is in neighboring Great Valley.

== Religion ==
Several churches operate in Ellicottville, including Roman Catholic, Lutheran, and Episcopal denominations. The local Free Presbyterian and United Methodist Churches merged into the "United Church of Ellicottville" in 1976.

== Notable people ==
- Charles Henry Bryan, former justice of the Supreme Court of California
- John A. Bryan, former Ohio State Auditor
- Staley N. Clarke, former US congressman
- Brian Dunkleman, involved with television show American Idol; born on September 25, 1971, in Ellicottville
- Cindy Oak, former US Ski Team member
- Commodore P. Vedder, former New York state senator
- Irv Weinstein, retired TV anchor, part-time resident until selling his house in 2014

== Geography ==
Ellicottville is located in the southwest corner of the town of Ellicottville at 42°16′N 78°40′W (42.2752, -78.6716).

According to the United States Census Bureau, the village has a total area of 0.85 square miles (2.2 km^{2}), of which 0.02 square miles (0.04 km^{2}), or 1.65%, is water.

Great Valley Creek, a tributary of the Allegheny River, flows through the village along the eastern edges; a smaller creek, Elk Creek, flows through the middle of the village.

Ellicottville is at the convergence of County Roads 13 and 71, along with NY-242 and U.S. Route 219. In lieu of numbered or standard street names, most of the village's streets are named after presidents and first ladies of the United States from prior to 1828: (George) Washington Street, (Thomas) Jefferson Street, (John) Adams Street, (James) Madison Street, (James) Monroe Street, Martha Street (alluding to Martha Washington and/or Martha Jefferson Randolph), and Elizabeth (Monroe) Street. (Martin) Van Buren Street and (Millard) Fillmore Avenue were later additions to the grid.

== Demographics ==
Historical population
Census	Pop.	Note	%±
1870	579		—
1880	748		29.2%
1890	852		13.9%
1900	886		4.0%
1910	985		11.2%
1920	950		−3.6%
1930	978		2.9%
1940	1,024		4.7%
1950	1,073		4.8%
1960	1,150		7.2%
1970	955		−17.0%
1980	713		−25.3%
1990	513		−28.1%
2000	472		−8.0%
2010	376		−20.3%
2020	284		−24.5%
2021 (est.)	284		0.0%
U.S. Decennial Census

As of the census of 2000, there were 472 people, 242 households, and 129 families residing in the village. The population density was 565.2 inhabitants per square mile (218.2/km^{2}). There were 565 housing units at an average density of 676.5 per square mile (261.2/km^{2}). The racial makeup of the village was 99.58% White, 0.21% Asian, and 0.21% from two or more races. Hispanic or Latino of any race were 0.64% of the population.

There were 242 households, out of which 12.4% had children under the age of 18 living with them, 43.4% were married couples living together, 8.7% had a female householder with no husband present, and 46.3% were non-families. 36.4% of all households were made up of individuals, and 11.6% had someone living alone who was 65 years of age or older. The average household size was 1.95 and the average family size was 2.47.

In the village, the population was spread out, with 12.9% under the age of 18, 7.8% from 18 to 24, 22.9% from 25 to 44, 35.0% from 45 to 64, and 21.4% who were 65 years of age or older. The median age was 48 years. For every 100 females, there were 97.5 males. For every 100 females age 18 and over, there were 99.5 males.

The median income for a household in the village was $37,750, and the median income for a family was $43,750. Males had a median income of $36,750 versus $19,306 for females. The per capita income for the village was $22,348. About 10.1% of families and 12.3% of the population were below the poverty line, including 24.6% of those under age 18 and 8.6% of those age 65 or over.
