= Pfeiffer-Wheeler American Chestnut Cabin =

Historic house in New York, United States

- U.S. National Register of Historic Places
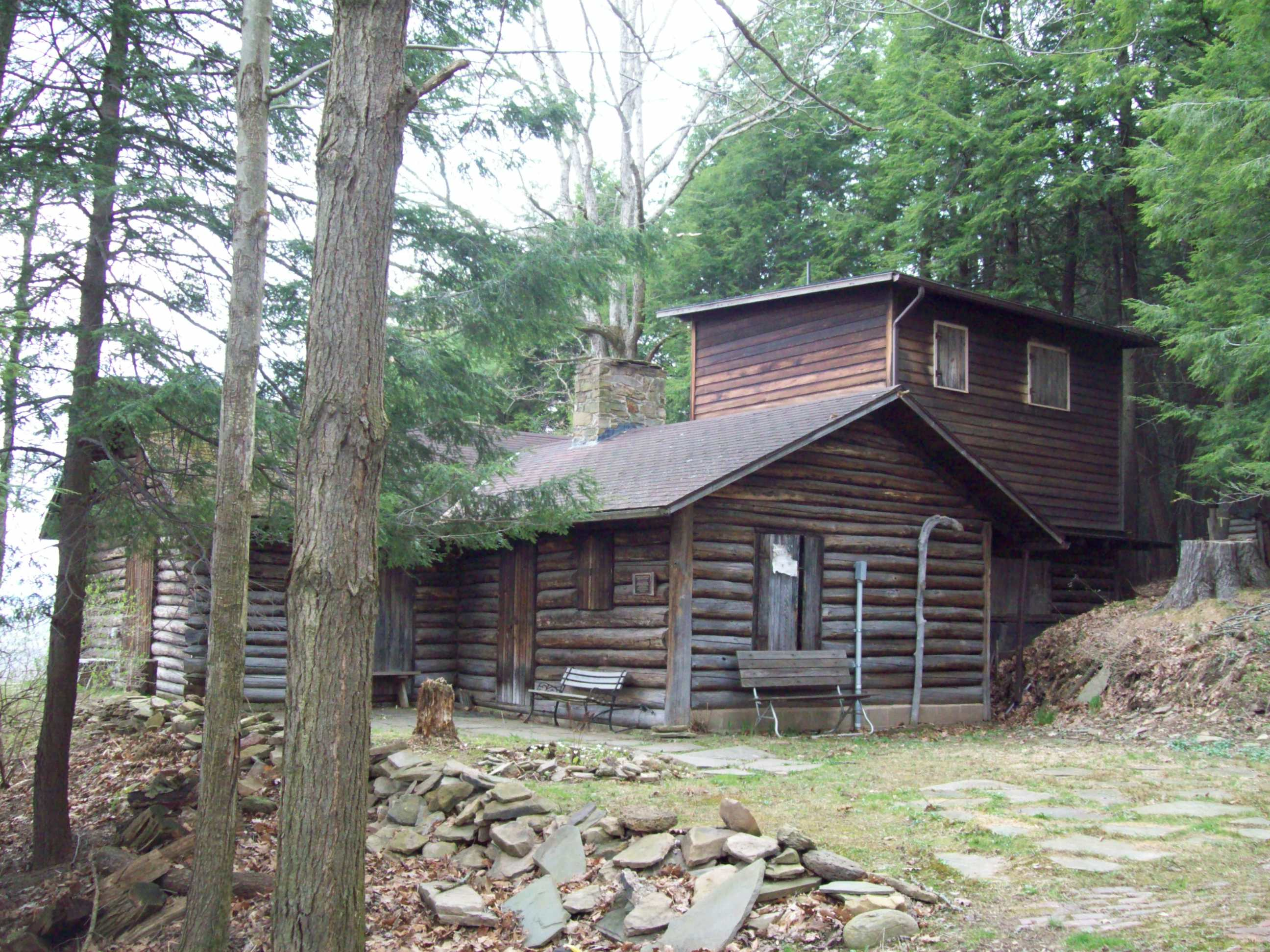
- Pfeiffer-Wheeler American Chestnut Cabin, April 2010

- Location within New York Location within the United States
- Location: Lillibridge Rd., Portville, New York
- Coordinates: 42°5′40″N 78°19′41″W
- Built: 1939-41, Built by Watters, Ivory L.
- Architects: Shaffer, Metcalf
- Architectural style: Rustic cabin
- NRHP reference No.: 01001436
- Added to NRHP: January 11, 2002

Pfeiffer-Wheeler American Chestnut Cabin is a historic log cabin located at the 188-acre (76 ha) Pfeiffer Nature Center, Portville in Cattaraugus County, New York. It is a log cabin constructed of American Chestnut in 1941. It is thought to be one of very few examples of a private residence utilizing American chestnut log frame construction from this period.

It was listed on the National Register of Historic Places in 2002.
