= Leon United Methodist Church =

Historic church in New York, United States

- U.S. National Register of Historic Places
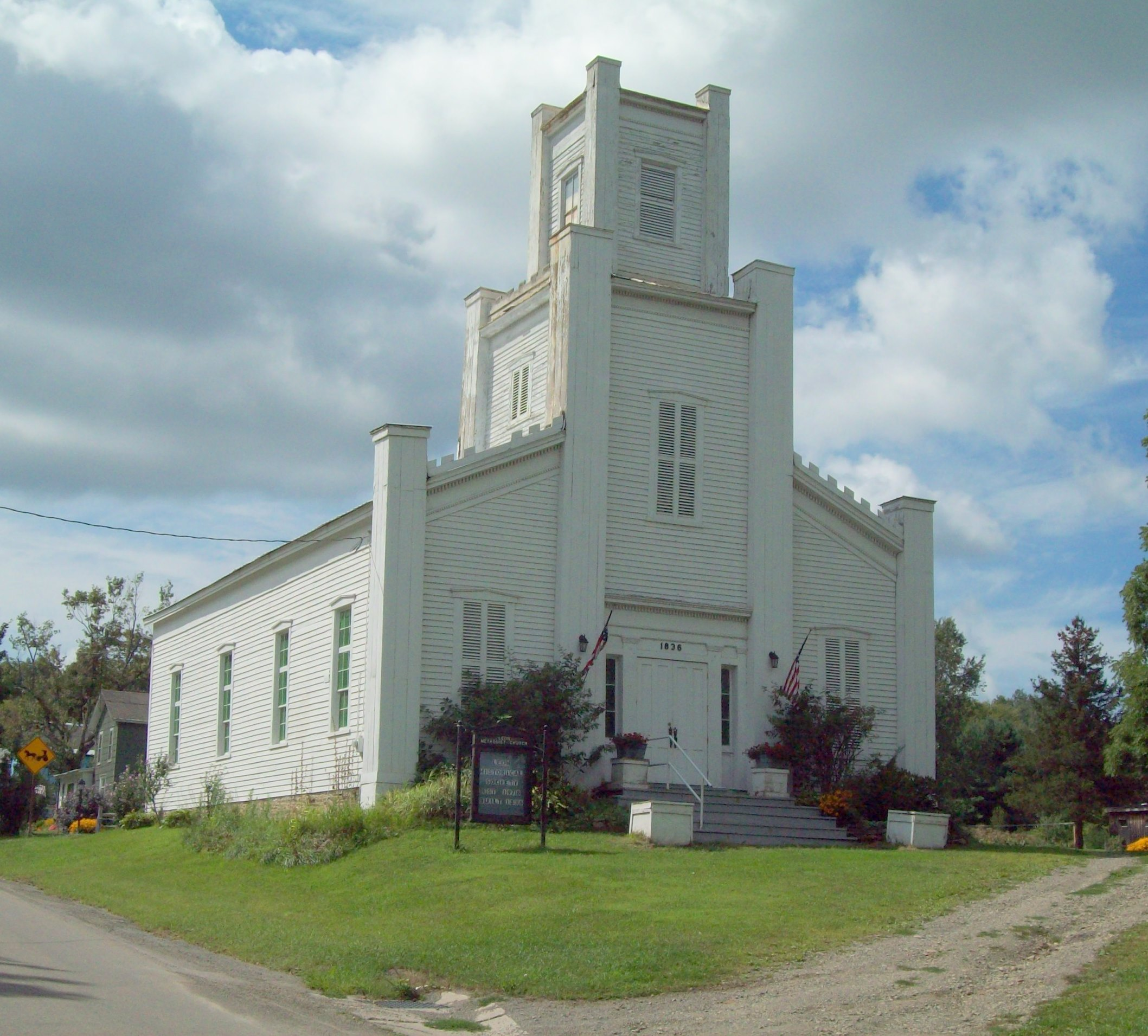
- Leon United Methodist Church, August 2010

- Location within New York Location within the United States
- Location: Jct. of Cattaraugus Co. 6 and U.S. Route 62, Leon, New York
- Coordinates: 42°17′36″N 79°1′3″W
- Built: 1836; 190 years ago
- Architectural style: Greek Revival, Gothic Revival
- NRHP reference No.: 00001413
- Added to NRHP: November 22, 2000

Leon United Methodist Church, now known as the Leon Historical Society Museum, is a historic church building located at Leon in Cattaraugus County, New York. It was constructed in 1836 and is in the Gothic Revival style. The United Methodist Church deconsecrated the building in 1992 and sold it to the historical society.

It was listed on the National Register of Historic Places in 2000.
