= Leon, New York =

- Town
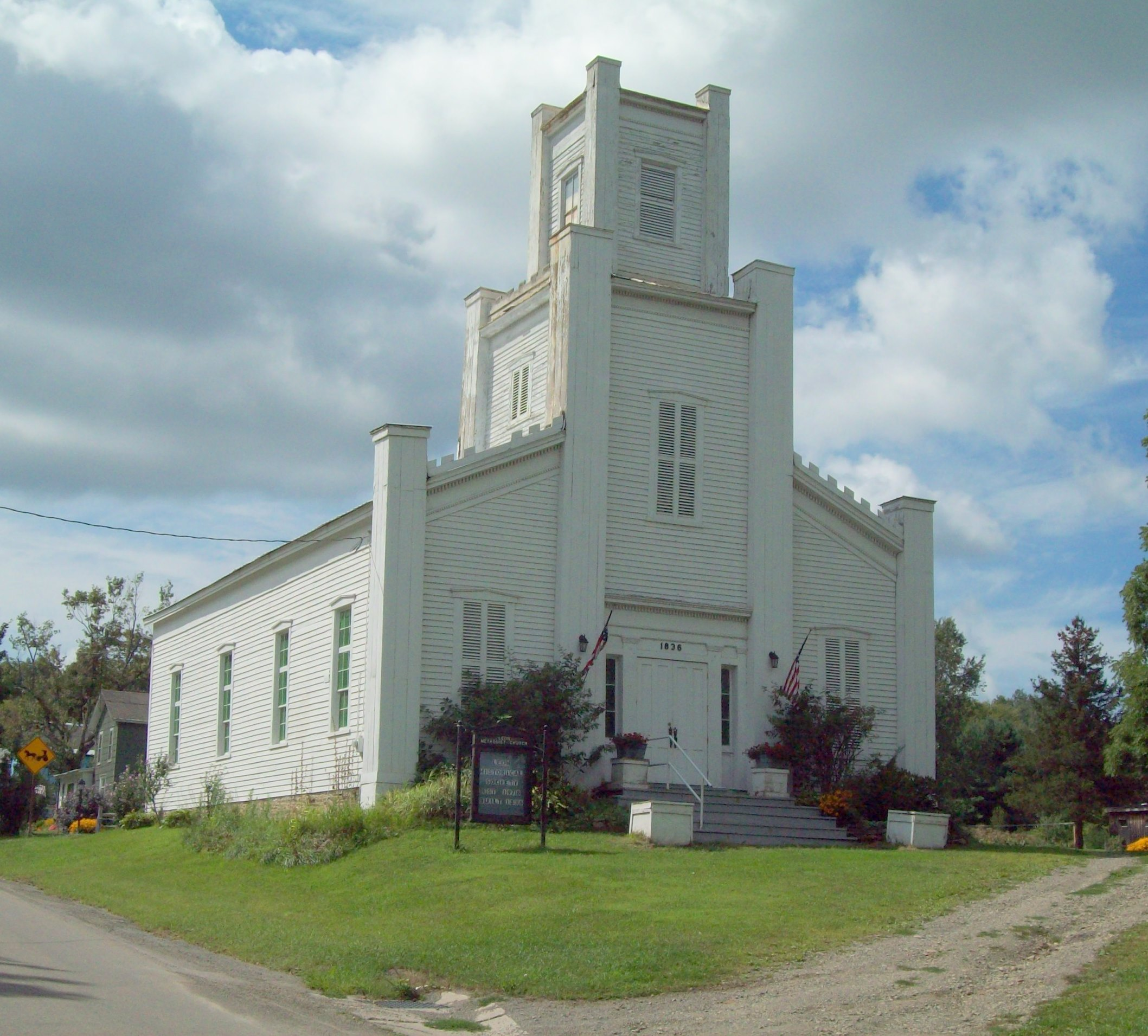
- Leon Historical Society Museum in the town center.

- Location within New York Location within the United States
- Coordinates: 42°18′2″N 79°0′11″W
- Country: United States
- State: New York
- County: Cattaraugus

Government
  - Type: Town Council
  - Town Supervisor: John R. Ellis, III. (D)
  - Town Council: Members' List: • Nicole Ennis (R); • Adam P. Hill (R); • Joshua Ennis (R); • Calvin Milliman (R)

Area
  - Total: 36.11 sq mi (93.52 km^{2})
  - Land: 36.08 sq mi (93.45 km^{2})
  - Water: 0.027 sq mi (0.07 km^{2})
- Elevation: 1,480 ft (450 m)

Population (2020)
  - Total: 1,253
  - Estimate (2021): 1,248
  - Density: 36.6/sq mi (14.13/km^{2})
- Time zone: UTC-5 (Eastern (EST))
  - Summer (DST): UTC-4 (EDT)
- ZIP Codes: 14751 (Leon); 14138 (South Dayton); 14719 (Cattaraugus); 14726 (Conewango Valley)
- Area code: 716
- FIPS code: 36-009-41982
- GNIS feature ID: 0979140
- Website: leonny.org

Leon (/ˈli.ʌn/ LEE-un)is a town in Cattaraugus County, New York. The population was 1,253 at the 2020 census. The name is derived from the former Kingdom of León in Spain, though it is pronounced differently. The town is on the western border of the county, northwest of the city of Salamanca.

== History ==
The area that would become the town was first settled c. 1819. The town of Leon was founded in 1832 from a part of the town of Conewango. The Leon Grange No. 795 and Leon United Methodist Church are listed on the National Register of Historic Places.

Leon's post office, ZIP Code 14751, opened June 20, 1837. It closed on July 24, 2010.

== Geography ==
According to the U.S. Census Bureau, the town has a total area of 36.2 square miles (93.8 km^{2}), of which 0.027 square miles (0.07 km^{2}), or 0.07%, is water. The west town line is the border of Chautauqua County.

Conewango Creek, a tributary of the Allegheny River, crosses the northwest part of the town, and Mud Creek flows through the south part of the town.

U.S. Route 62 is a major north-south highway through the western part of the town. County Route 6 intersects the road in the town center.

=== Adjacent towns and areas ===
Leon is south of the town of Dayton and north of the town of Conewango. To the east is the town of New Albion. The west boundary is shared by the town of Cherry Creek in Chautauqua County.

== Demographics ==
Historical population
Census	Pop.	Note	%±
1840	1,326		—
1850	1,340		1.1%
1860	1,399		4.4%
1870	1,204		−13.9%
1880	1,192		−1.0%
1890	1,194		0.2%
1900	1,003		−16.0%
1910	859		−14.4%
1920	729		−15.1%
1930	720		−1.2%
1940	755		4.9%
1950	738		−2.3%
1960	808		9.5%
1970	878		8.7%
1980	1,055		20.2%
1990	1,245		18.0%
2000	1,380		10.8%
2010	1,365		−1.1%
2020	1,253		−8.2%
2021 (est.)	1,248		−0.4%
U.S. Decennial Census

As of the 2010 census, there were 1,380 people, 378 households, and 289 families residing in the town. The population density was 38.1 inhabitants per square mile (14.7/km^{2}). There were 464 housing units at an average density of 12.8 per square mile (4.9/km^{2}). The racial makeup of the town was 99.13% White, 0.07% Native American, 0.14% Asian, and 0.65% from two or more races. Hispanic or Latino of any race were 0.29% of the population.

There were 378 households, out of which 44.2% had children under the age of 18 living with them, 66.4% were married couples living together, 8.2% had a female householder with no husband present, and 23.3% were non-families. 19.0% of all households were made up of individuals, and 7.7% had someone living alone who was 65 years of age or older. The average household size was 3.64 and the average family size was 4.30.

In the town, the population was spread out, with 42.3% under the age of 18, 9.8% from 18 to 24, 23.1% from 25 to 44, 16.9% from 45 to 64, and 7.9% who were 65 years of age or older. The median age was 23 years. For every 100 females, there were 96.3 males. For every 100 females age 18 and over, there were 93.2 males.

The median income for a household in the town was $30,333, and the median income for a family was $32,946. Males had a median income of $25,625 versus $22,266 for females. The per capita income for the town was $10,189. About 26.1% of families and 35.1% of the population were below the poverty line, including 50.2% of those under age 18 and 14.7% of those age 65 or over.

An estimated 76% of the population of Leon are members of the Old Order Amish, a factor in the town's continued population growth since the middle of the 20th century, a rarity in a county where population has otherwise been in general decline.

== Notable people ==
- Charles N. Daniels, former architect
- Albert T. Fancher, former New York state senator
- Wilbur F. Sanders, former U.S. senator

== Communities and locations in Leon ==
- Conewango Creek – A stream flowing through the northern part of the town.
- East Leon – A hamlet in the northeast corner of the town on County Road 5.
- Kendall Corners – A location by the eastern town line on County Road 5.
- Leon (or "Leon Center") – The hamlet of Leon, centrally located in the town on County Road 6 and US Route 62.
- Millmans Corners – A location west of Leon village by the east town line on Route 6.
- Meyers Corners – A location at the north town line on Route 62.
- Mud Creek – A stream flowing westward past Leon is a tributary of Conewango Creek. The first settlement was made along Mud Creek.
- Rays Corners – A hamlet near the east town line on County Road 44.
- Thompsonville – A former community in the southeast part of the town.
