= Jefferson Street Cemetery =

Historic cemetery in New York, United States

- U.S. National Register of Historic Places
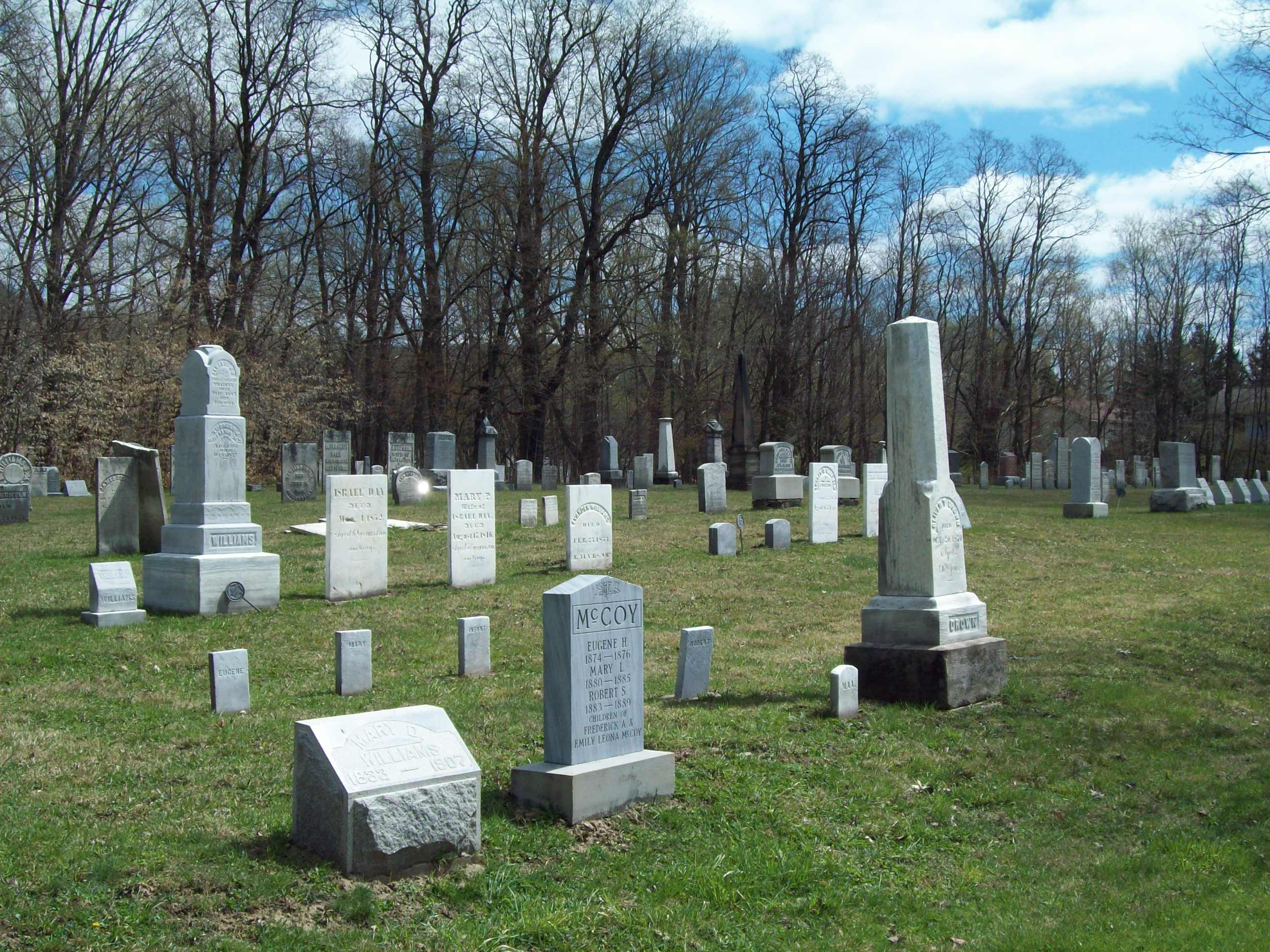
- Jefferson Street Cemetery, April 2012

- Location within New York Location within the United States
- Location: East side of Jefferson St. between Martha St. & Aspen Dr., Ellicottville, New York
- Coordinates: 42°16′13″N 78°40′07″W
- Area: 1.75 acres (0.71 ha)
- Built: 1817
- NRHP reference No.: 11000994
- Added to NRHP: January 4, 2012

Jefferson Street Cemetery is a historic cemetery located at Ellicottville in Cattaraugus County, New York. The cemetery was established in 1817 and was the first to serve the village. It is a settlement era burial ground consisting of eight to ten rows of burials. There are over 400 burials dating from 1817 to 2003. The markers are of marble, granite, and sandstone.

It was listed on the National Register of Historic Places in 2012.
