= North Lyndon Schoolhouse =

- U.S. National Register of Historic Places
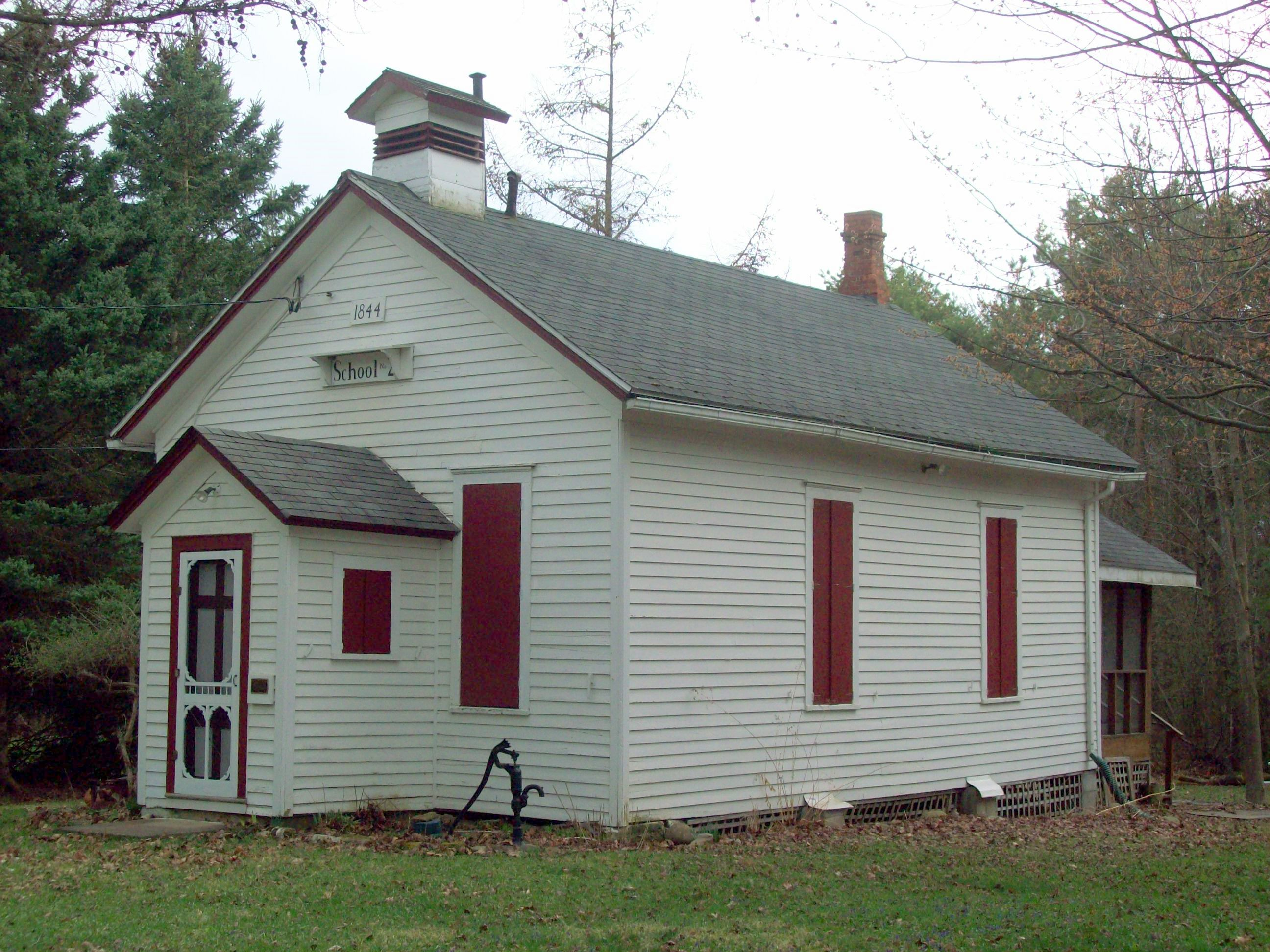
- North Lyndon Schoolhouse, April 2010

- Location within New York Location within the United States
- Location: 7617 North Center Rd., Lyndon, New York
- Coordinates: 42°19′51″N 78°21′16″W
- Built: 1844
- Architect: Chapman, William F.
- Architectural style: one room school
- NRHP reference No.: 00000571
- Added to NRHP: September 15, 2000

North Lyndon Schoolhouse is a historic one-room school building located at Lyndon in Cattaraugus County, New York. It was built in 1844, and functioned as a local school until 1948.

It was listed on the National Register of Historic Places in 2000.
