= Portville Free Library =

- U.S. National Register of Historic Places
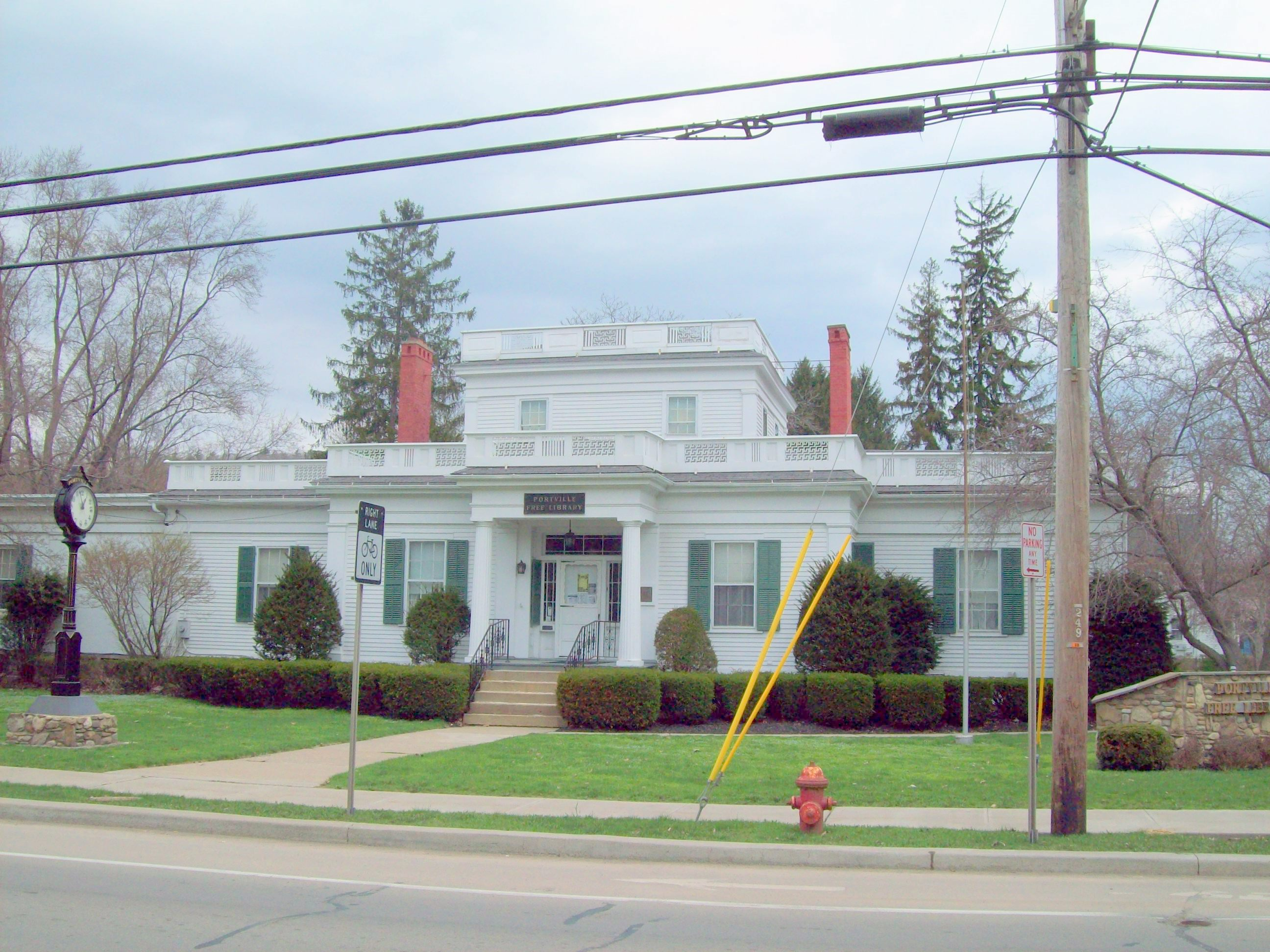
- Portville Free Library, April 2010

- Location within New York Location within the United States
- Interactive map showing the location for
- Location: 2 N. Main St., Portville, New York
- Coordinates: 42°2′20″N 78°20′25″W
- Built: 1847
- Architectural style: Colonial Revival, Greek Revival
- NRHP reference No.: 91001671
- Added to NRHP: November 7, 1991

Portville Free Library, formerly the Smith Parish House, is a historic library building located at Portville in Cattaraugus County, New York. The original house was built for early Portville settler Smith Parish in 1847 as a two-story, three bay dwelling in the Greek Revival style. It was subsequently expanded in the 1860s with a one-story, one bay wing. The building became the Portville Free Library in 1909 and expanded in 1915, in 1930, and finally in 1960.

It was listed on the National Register of Historic Places in 1991.
