= Leon Grange No. 795 =

- U.S. National Register of Historic Places
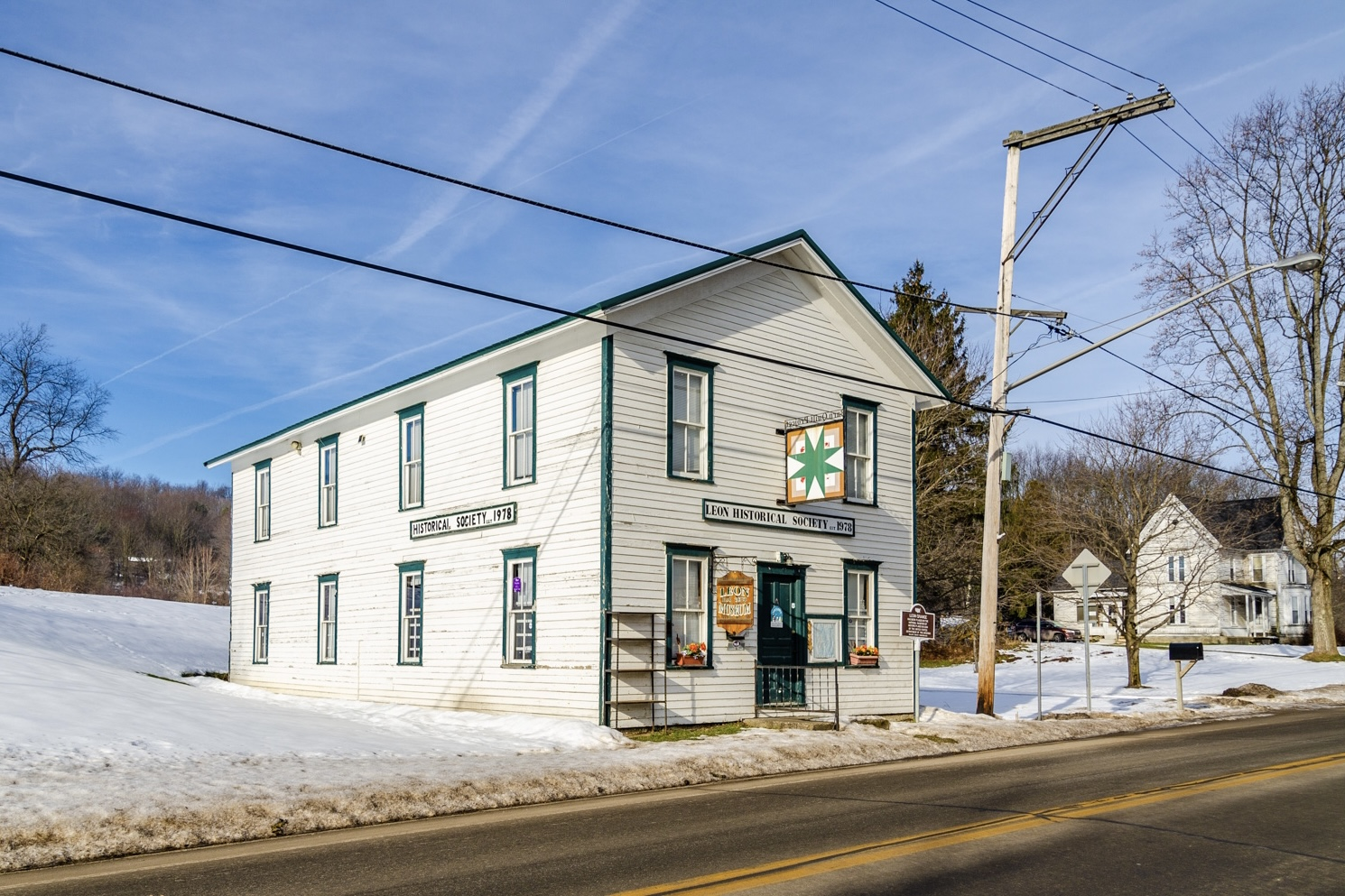

- Location within New York Location within the United States
- Location: US 62 near Leon–New Albion Rd., Leon, New York
- Coordinates: 42°17′39″N 79°01′00″W
- Area: Less than 1 acre (0.40 ha)
- Built: 1903-1904
- NRHP reference No.: 13001089
- Added to NRHP: January 15, 2014

Leon Grange No. 795, also known as the Aiken-Silvernail House, is a historic home located at Leon in Cattaraugus County, New York. It was built in 1903–1904, and is a two-story, three bay by four bay, frame building. It has a gable roof and is sheathed in clapboard siding. The building has housed the Leon Historical Society since 1977.

It was listed on the National Register of Historic Places in 2014.
