= House at 520 Hostageh Road =

Historic house in New York, United States

- U.S. National Register of Historic Places
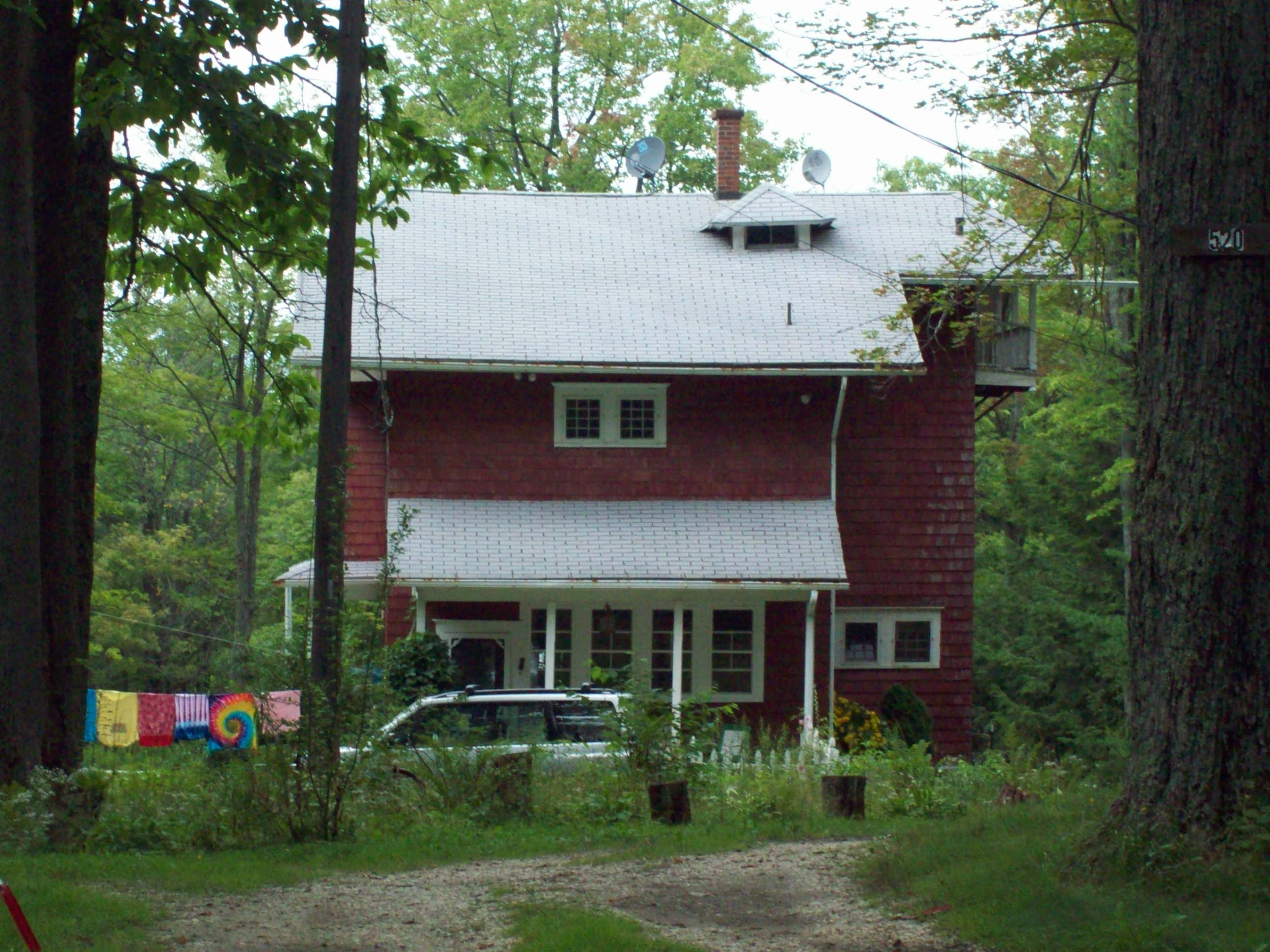
- House at 520 Hostageh Road, August 2010

- Location within New York Location within the United States
- Location: 520 Ho-Sta-Geh Road, Rock City, New York
- Coordinates: 42°0′52.82″N 78°28′17.14″W
- Area: 01.3 acres (0.53 ha)
- Built: 1903
- Architectural style: Swiss Cottage
- NRHP reference No.: 09000038
- Added to NRHP: February 20, 2009

House at 520 Hostageh Road, also known as Lyndhurst, is a historic seasonal cottage located at Rock City in Cattaraugus County, New York. It was built in 1903 and is a 2 1/2-story Swiss Cottage wood-frame dwelling with hipped roofs and an L-shaped front porch. Also on the property is a contributing gambrel-roofed barn containing the original privy.

It was listed on the National Register of Historic Places in 2009.

== Gallery ==
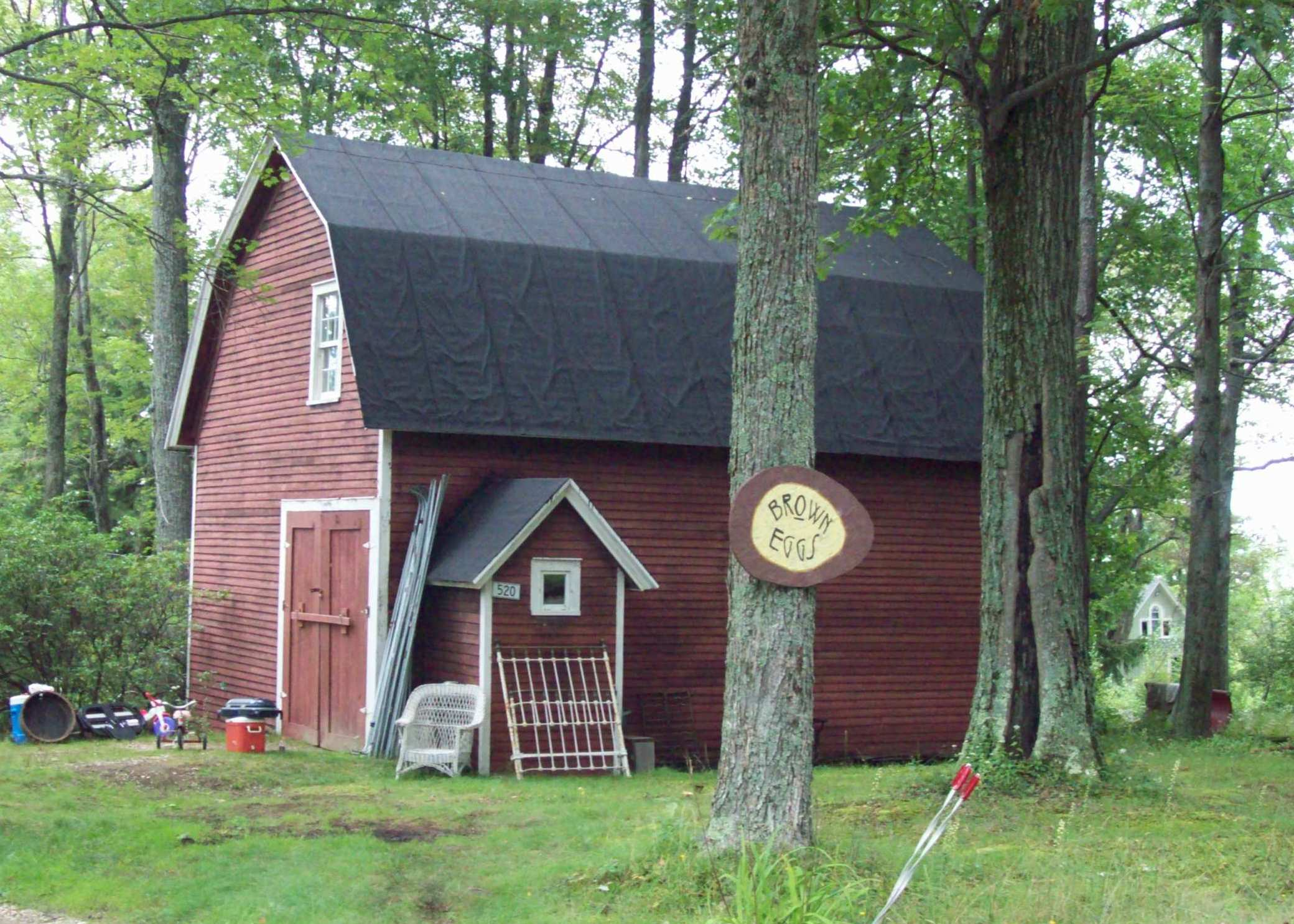
