= Simeon B. Robbins House =

Historic house in New York, United States

- U.S. National Register of Historic Places
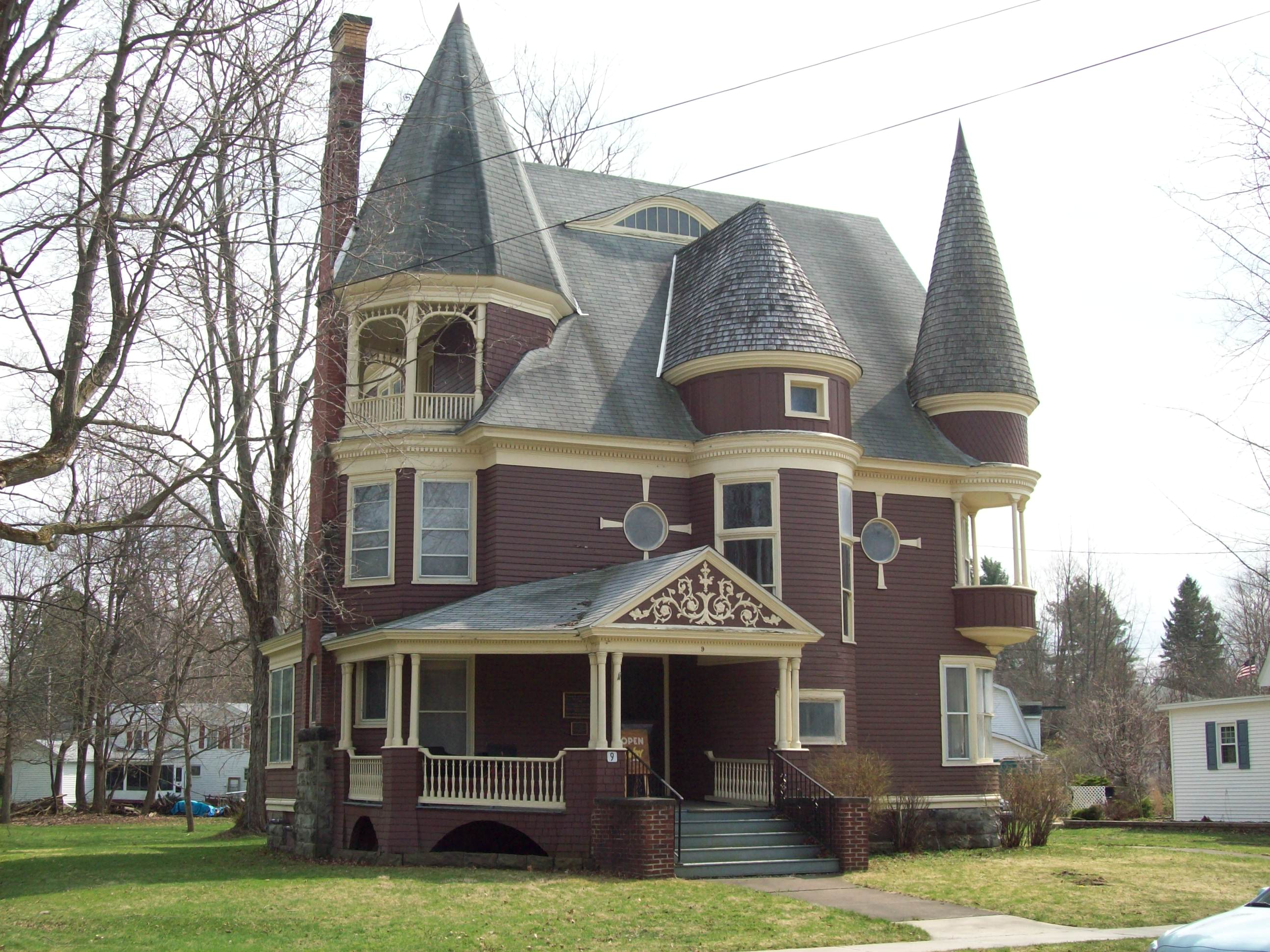
- Simeon B. Robbins House, April 2010

- Location within New York Location within the United States
- Location: 9 Pine St., Franklinville, New York
- Coordinates: 42°20′16″N 78°27′23″W
- Built: 1895
- Architect: Crosby, Alanson; Corsett, Thomas
- Architectural style: Queen Anne
- NRHP reference No.: 03000091
- Added to NRHP: March 07, 2003

Simeon B. Robbins House, or The Miner's Cabin, is a historic home located at Franklinville in Cattaraugus County, New York. It is a three-story, Queen Anne style wood frame dwelling built in 1895. The building features three towers. It is currently used as a museum and meeting space by the Ischua Valley Historical Society.

It was listed on the National Register of Historic Places in 2003.
