= Union and State Streets Historic District =

Historic district in New York, United States

- U.S. National Register of Historic Places
- U.S. Historic district
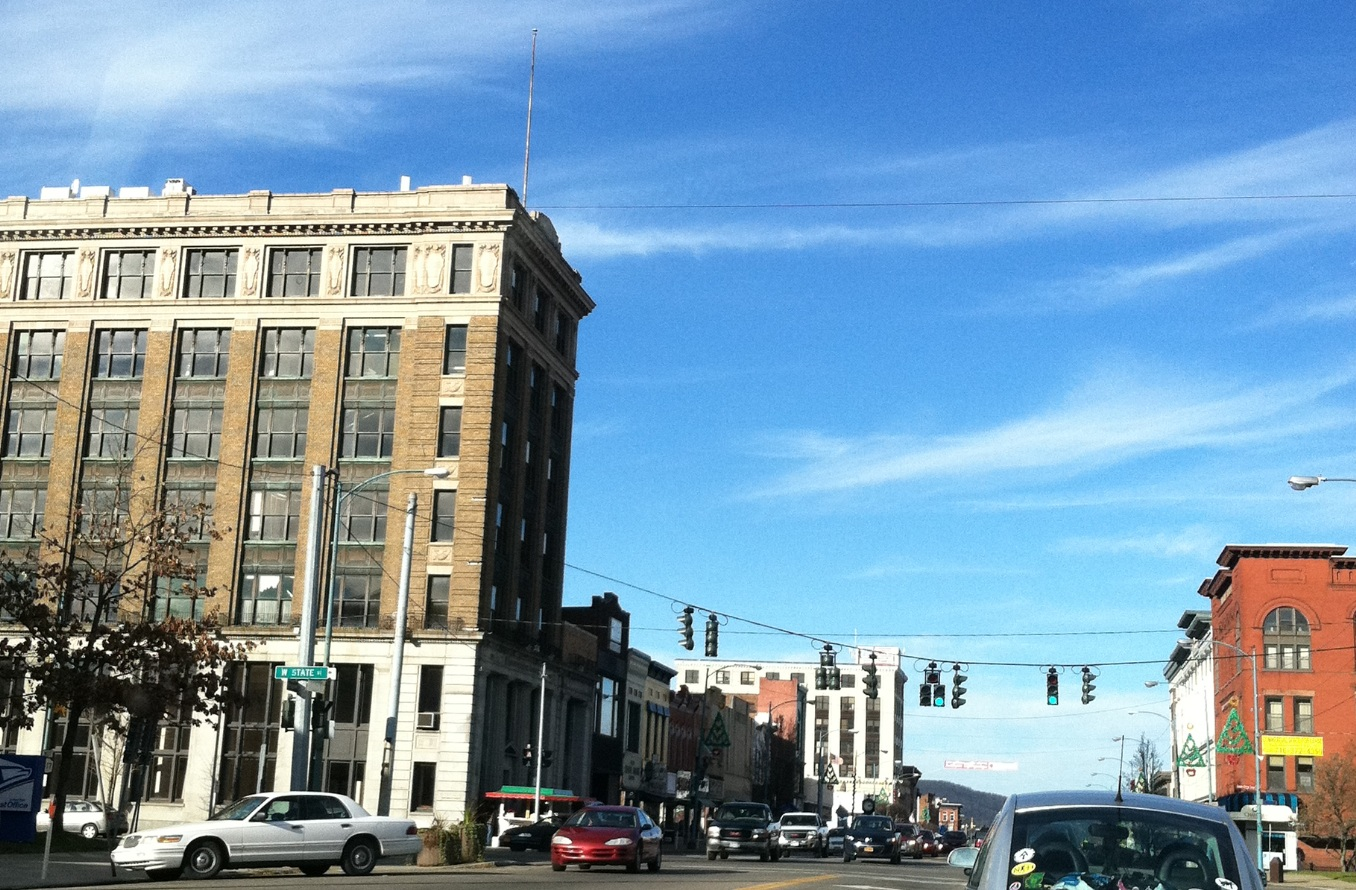
- Union and State Streets, November 2011

- Location within New York Location within the United States
- Location: Roughly 101-133 N. Union, 110-114, 116 W. State & 102, 116, 120 S. Union Sts., Olean, New York
- Coordinates: 42°04′40″N 78°25′59″W
- Area: 5.78 acres (2.34 ha)
- Built: c. 1866-1939
- Architect: Mowbray and Uffinger, James Knox Taylor, Edward Lipincott Tilton, Warner and Brocket
- Architectural style: Queen Anne, Beaux-Arts, Art Deco
- NRHP reference No.: 15000265
- Added to NRHP: May 21, 2015

Union and State Streets Historic District is a national historic district located at Olean in Cattaraugus County, New York. The district encompasses 17 contributing buildings in the central business district of Olean. The district developed between about 1866 and 1939, and includes buildings in a variety of architectural styles including Beaux-Arts, Queen Anne, and Art Deco. Located in the district are the separately listed Olean Post Office and Olean Public Library. Other notable buildings include the Former First National Bank, current Manufacturers Hanover Building by Mowbray and Uffinger (c. 1915, 1938, 1950), Original First National Bank of Olean (c. 1866-1869), Masonic Temple by Warner and Brocket (1893), Olean House (c. 1889, 1893), and W.T. Grant Building (c. 1873–1878, Façade Update c. 1935-1940).

It was listed on the National Register of Historic Places in 2015.
