= Park Square Historic District (Franklinville, New York) =

Historic district in New York, United States

- U.S. National Register of Historic Places
- U.S. Historic district
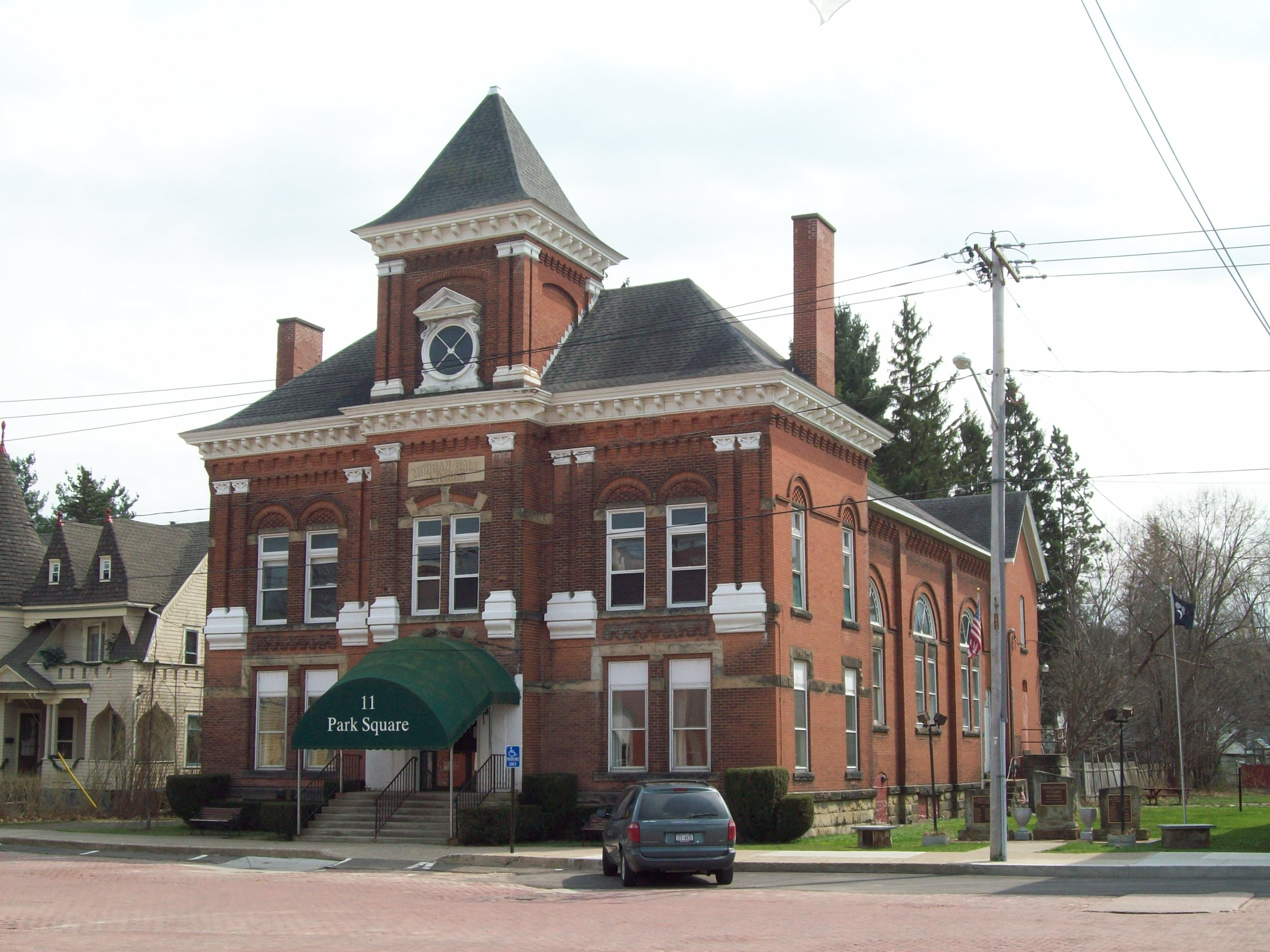
- Park Square Historic District, April 2010

- Location within New York Location within the United States
- Location: Park Square roughly bounded by N. Main, Pine, Chestnut, S. Main, Elm, and Church Sts., Franklinville, New York
- Coordinates: 42°20′14″N 78°27′27″W
- Architect: Napier, George H.
- Architectural style: Classical Revival, Italianate, Queen Anne
- NRHP reference No.: 86002719
- Added to NRHP: September 22, 1986

Park Square Historic District is a historic district located at Franklinville in Cattaraugus County, New York. The district encompasses the historic core of the village of Franklinville and include the landscaped village green, brickpaved streets, and the commercial or civic buildings fronting on the square or located immediately adjacent to it. Significant buildings range in date from 1828 to 1924 and reflect a variety of 19th-century and early 20th-century architectural styles including Queen Anne, Italianate, and Classical Revival styles. The village square was established in 1876. The district contains 21 contributing buildings and 2 contributing structures.

It was listed on the National Register of Historic Places in 1986.

== Gallery ==
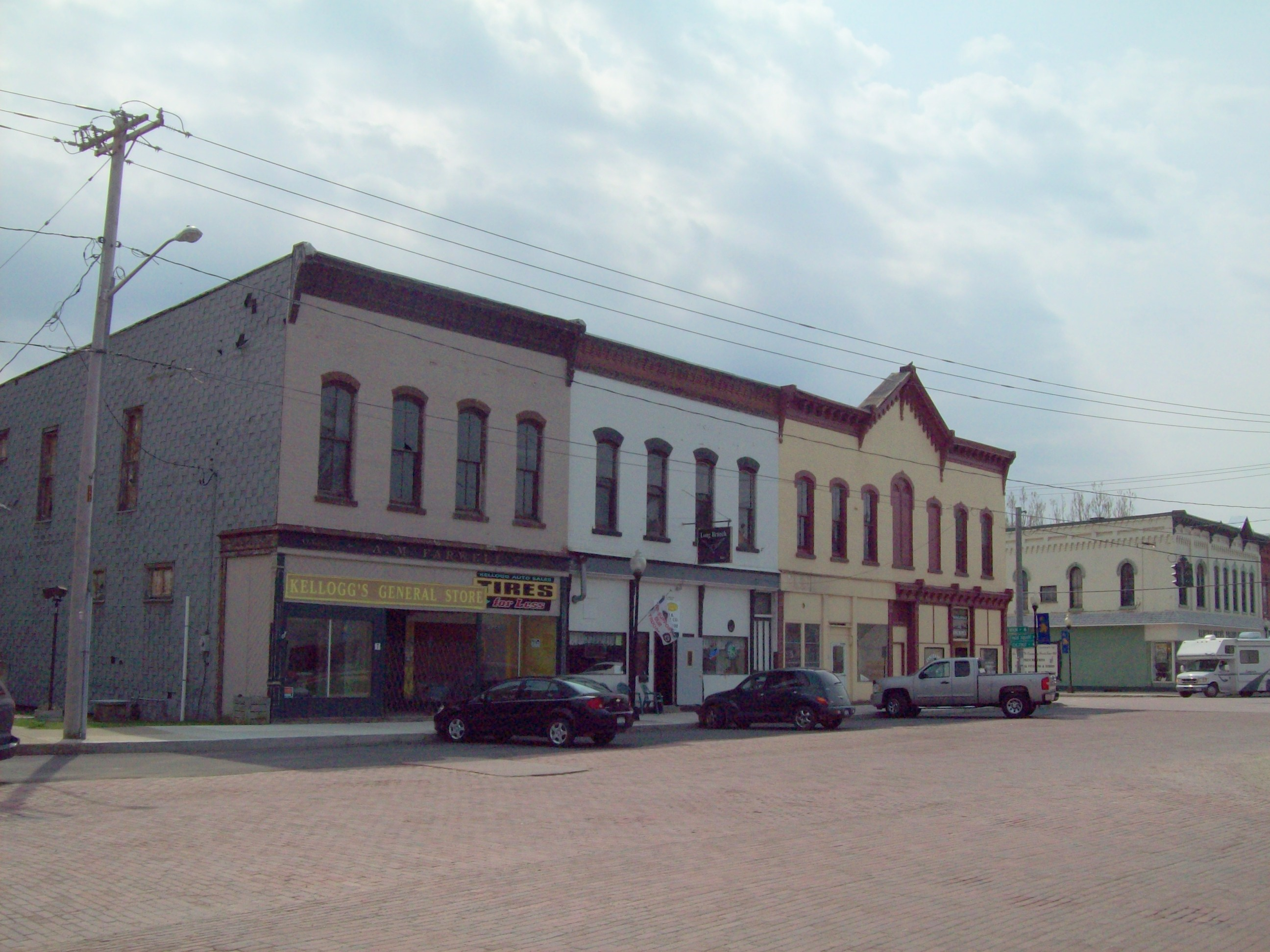
Park Square Historic District - Commercial Block, April 2010
