= Ellicottville Town Hall =

- U.S. National Register of Historic Places
- New York State Register of Historic Places
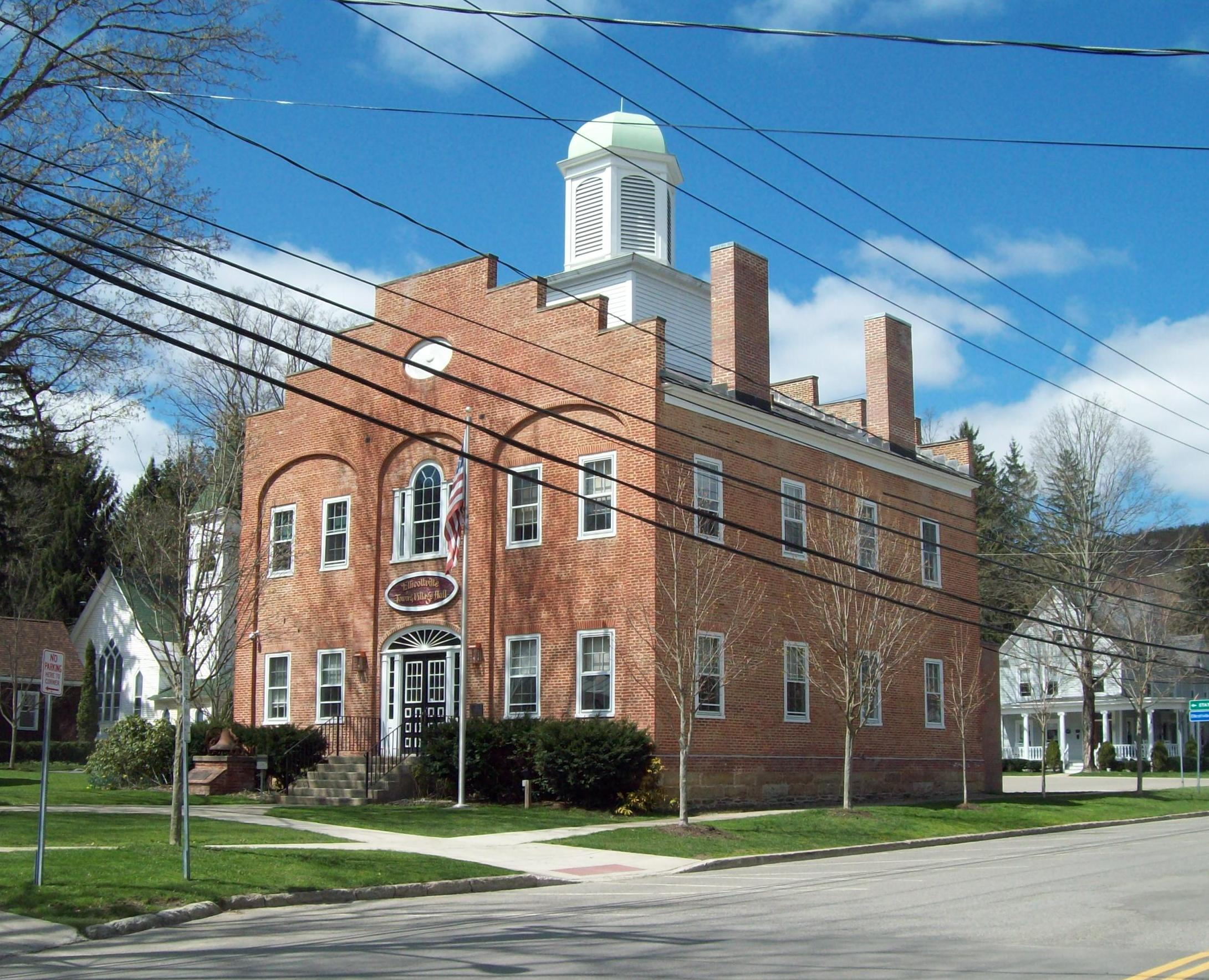
- Ellicottville Town Hall, April 2012

- Location within New York Location within the United States
- Location: Village Sq., NW corner of Washington and Jefferson Sts., Ellicottville, New York
- Coordinates: 42°16′31″N 78°40′25″W
- Built: 1829
- NRHP reference No.: 73001166
- NYSRHP No.: 00947.000001

Significant dates
- Added to NRHP: April 03, 1973
- Designated NYSRHP: June 23, 1980

Ellicottville Town Hall is a historic town hall building located at Ellicottville, New York in Cattaraugus County, New York. It was erected in 1829, as the Cattaraugus County Court House. It is a two-story brick structure set on a limestone foundation. The structure features a distinctive cupola. Much of the original interior was destroyed by a fire in 1969.

It was listed on the National Register of Historic Places in 1973.
