= Olean Public Library =

- The Old Olean Public Library
- U.S. National Register of Historic Places
- U.S. Historic district – Contributing property
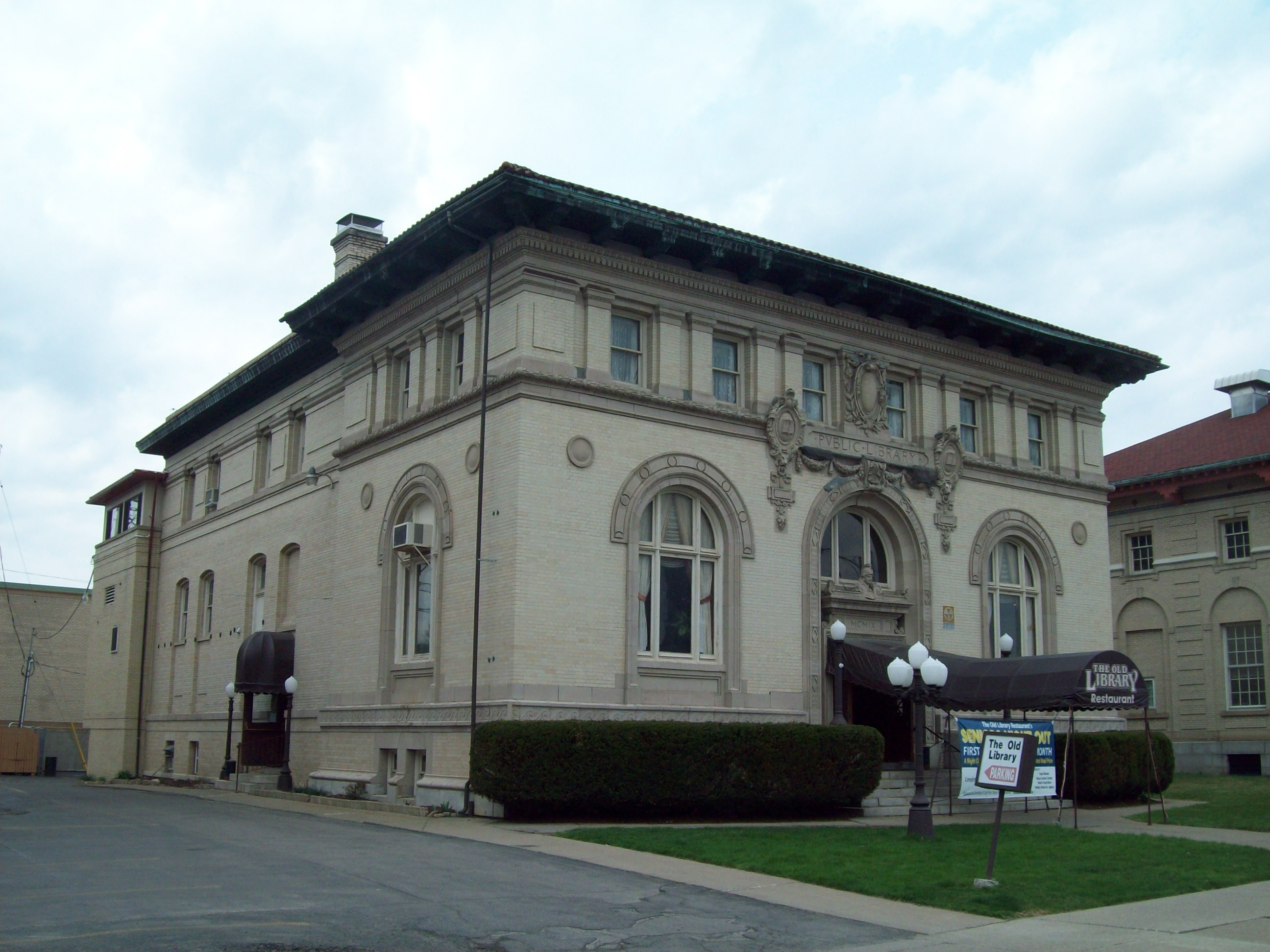
- Old Olean Public Library, April 2010

- Location within New York Location within the United States
- Location: 116 S. Union St., Olean, New York
- Coordinates: 42°4′36″N 78°25′50″W
- Built: 1909
- Architect: Tilton, Edward L.
- Architectural style: Beaux-Arts
- NRHP reference No.: 85001498
- Added to NRHP: July 11, 1985

The Old Olean Library is a historic beaux arts library located at 116 S. Union St. in Olean, Cattaraugus County, New York. The library was listed on the National Register of Historic Places in 1985. It is located in the Union and State Streets Historic District.

== History ==
=== Olean Library Association ===
On March 25, 1871, the "Olean Library Association" was established by a small group of public-spirited citizens. The first meeting was held in Miss Lyon's school house on Laurens Street. In May 1871, the library settled in the rear of John G. Pelton's tailor shop (located on the west side of North Union Street, midway between Laurens and State streets). It was open only 1 day per week, Saturday from 1-9 PM. Annual dues were $2.00 for gentlemen and $1.00 for ladies. 697 books formed the collection.

On September 30, 1878, the library moved to a new home under the supervision of Charles Gillingham. It was located in a room rented from P.J. Hastings in what was known as the Berg (or Birge, after Norman Birge, a harness maker who owned the block). Later, it moved to quarters on the second floor of the Exchange Bank building, and then to 102 Hamilton Street where it remained until 1889.

=== Forman Library ===
On June 12, 1888, the library was renamed in honor of George V. Forman, who donated the property and building. Forman was a founder of "Vandergrift, Forman & Company," which became part of the Standard Oil Company. The library moved into its new home on Forman property on April 2, 1889.

=== "Old" Olean Public Library ===
On December 13, 1906, the charter which was granted by the Board of Regents of New York State named the institution "The Olean Public Library" and it became a free library. In April 1909, the library relocated to the second floor of City Hall while the "Carnegie Library" was being built on the Forman property. The cornerstone for Carnegie building was laid on July 3, 1909.

==== Features ====
The library is a historic, built in 1909, with funds provided by the philanthropist Andrew Carnegie was one of 3,000 such libraries constructed between 1885 and 1919, and one of 107 in New York State. Carnegie provided $40,000 (equivalent to $1,433,000 in 2025) toward the construction of the Olean library. The building was designed by architect Edward L. Tilton in the Beaux-Arts style. The interior features a grand stairway and entrance, large rooms, and central atrium. The Carnegie building was opened May 23, 1910 and a period of growth in the size and scope of the collection and patronage began almost immediately. It was listed on the National Register of Historic Places in 1985.

=== "New" Olean Public Library ===
In the early 1970s, a new site was secured for the library and on September 21, 1973, the library opened at 134 North Second Street in a former Loblaws Supermarket. The modern facility continues to meet the changing informational needs of the community. The mission of the Olean Public Library is to improve the community's quality of life by providing equal access to materials in various formats, programming and services for patrons of all ages, and a capable and professional staff available to assist members of the greater Olean community in support of their educational, informational, and leisure needs.

== Present day ==
The original NRHP listed "Olean Public Library" was occupied by the "Olean Historical Society" and the "Department of Aging" from 1974 to 1979. In 1982, the Olean Board of Education sold the property to Louis Marra, which made possible the opening of The Old Library Restaurant and "The Old Bed and Breakfast Library Inn."

== See also ==
- George V. Forman
