= List of places in New York: Y =

This list of current cities, towns, unincorporated communities, counties, and other recognized places in the U.S. state of New York also includes information on the number and names of counties in which the place lies, and its lower and upper zip code bounds, if applicable.

List of places in New York: A | B | C | D | E | F | G | H | I | J | K | L | M | N | O | P | Q | R | S | T | U | V | W | X | Y | Z

| Name of place | Counties | Principal county | Lower zip code | Upper zip code |
|---|---|---|---|---|
| Yaddo | 1 | Saratoga County | 12866 | |
| Yagerville | 1 | Ulster County | 12458 | |
| Yale | 1 | Seneca County | | |
| Yaleville | 1 | Chenango County | | |
| Yaleville | 1 | St. Lawrence County | 13668 | |
| Yankee Lake | 1 | Sullivan County | 12790 | |
| Yaphank | 1 | Suffolk County | 11980 | |
| Yates | 1 | Orleans County | 14098 | |
| Yates Center | 1 | Orleans County | | |
| Yatesville | 1 | Yates County | 14527 | |
| Yellow Mills | 1 | Wayne County | | |
| Yonkers (city) | 1 | Westchester County | 10701 | 10799 (none beyond 10710 in use) |
| York | 1 | Livingston County | 14592 | |
| York | 1 | Wayne County | | |
| York Corners | 1 | Allegany County | 14895 | |
| Yorkshire (town) | 1 | Cattaraugus County | 14173 | |
| Yorkshire (census-designated place) | 1 | Cattaraugus County | 14173 | |
| Yorktown (town) | 1 | Westchester County | 10598 | |
| Yorktown Heights (census-designated place) | 1 | Westchester County | 10598 | |
| Yorkville | 1 | New York County | 10128 | |
| Yorkville | 1 | Oneida County | 13495 | |
| Yosts | 1 | Montgomery County | | |
| Young Hickory | 1 | Steuben County | 14885 | |
| Youngs | 1 | Delaware County | 13849 | |
| Youngs | 1 | Onondaga County | | |
| Youngstown | 1 | Niagara County | 14174 | |
| Youngstown Estates | 1 | Niagara County | 14174 | |
| Youngsville | 1 | Sullivan County | 12791 | |
| Yulan | 1 | Sullivan County | 12792 | |
