= Lime Lake-Machias, New York =

Lime Lake-Machias
- Former CDP
- Nickname: Lime Lake
- Location within the state of New York
- Coordinates: 42°25′40″N 078°28′58″W
- Country: United States
- State: New York
- County: Cattaraugus

Area
  - Total: 3.7 sq mi (9.5 km^{2})
  - Land: 3.3 sq mi (8.5 km^{2})
  - Water: 0.39 sq mi (1.0 km^{2})

Population (2000)
  - Total: 1,422
  - Density: 430/sq mi (170/km^{2})
- Time zone: UTC-5 (Eastern (EST))
  - Summer (DST): UTC-4 (EDT)
- FIPS code: 36-42350

Lime Lake-Machias was a census-designated place including two hamlets in the northeast part of the Town of Machias, in Cattaraugus County, New York, United States. As of the 2000 census, it had a population of 1,422. For the 2010 census, the area was delineated as two separate CDPs, Lime Lake (pop. 867) and Machias (pop. 471).

== Geography ==
Lime Lake-Machias is located at 42°25′40″N 78°28′58″W (42.427655, -78.482689).

According to the United States Census Bureau, the CDP had a total area of 3.7 square miles (9.6 km^{2}), of which 3.3 square miles (8.5 km^{2}) was land and 0.4 square miles (1.0 km^{2}), or 10.08%, was water.

Lime Lake is also the name of a small lake in this region, about one mile in diameter.

New York State Route 16 and Cattaraugus County Route 62 connect Lime Lake to Machias. New York State Route 242's eastern terminus is just south of Lime Lake.

== Demographics ==
As of the census of 2000, there were 1,422 people, 526 households, and 360 families residing in the community. The population density was 430.9 inhabitants per square mile (166.4/km^{2}). There were 819 housing units at an average density of 248.2 per square mile (95.8/km^{2}). The racial makeup of the CDP was 97.82% White, 0.21% African American, 0.35% Native American, 0.14% from other races, and 1.48% from two or more races. Hispanic or Latino of any race were 0.98% of the population.

There were 526 households, out of which 31.4% had children under the age of 18 living with them, 52.7% were married couples living together, 8.7% had a female householder with no husband present, and 31.4% were non-families. Slightly over quarter (26.0%) of all households were made up of individuals, and 12.9% had someone living alone who was 65 years of age or older. The average household size was 2.49 and the average family size was 2.96.

In the region, the population was spread out, with 23.1% under the age of 18, 8.0% from 18 to 24, 25.8% from 25 to 44, 22.1% from 45 to 64, and 21.0% who were 65 years of age or older. The median age was 41 years. For every 100 females, there were 95.3 males. For every 100 females age 18 and over, there were 86.1 males.

The median income for a household in the community was $26,579, and the median income for a family was $33,194. Males had a median income of $26,429 versus $22,083 for females. The per capita income for the CDP was $13,696. About 12.6% of families and 15.5% of the population were below the poverty line, including 21.5% of those under age 18 and 10.9% of those age 65 or over.
