= Machias (CDP), New York =

Machias, New York
- Census-designated place
- Location within the state of New York
- Coordinates: 42°25′9″N 78°29′40″W
- Country: United States
- State: New York
- County: Cattaraugus
- Town: Machias

Area
  - Total: 1.15 sq mi (2.97 km^{2})
  - Land: 0.98 sq mi (2.54 km^{2})
  - Water: 0.17 sq mi (0.44 km^{2})
- Elevation: 1,685 ft (514 m)

Population (2020)
  - Total: 505
  - Density: 515.3/sq mi (198.97/km^{2})
- Time zone: UTC-5 (Eastern (EST))
  - Summer (DST): UTC-4 (EDT)
- ZIP code: 14101
- FIPS code: 36-44226

Machias is a hamlet and census-designated place (CDP) in the northeast part of the town of Machias, in Cattaraugus County, New York, United States. As of the 2010 census, it had a population of 471. Prior to the 2010 census, the area was delineated as part of the Lime Lake-Machias CDP.

== Geography ==
Machias village is located in the northeast part of the town of Machias and comprises the developed center of the town. It is bordered to the north by the community of Lime Lake. Ischua Creek, a tributary of the Allegheny River, forms the southern edge of the CDP.

According to the United States Census Bureau, the Machias CDP has a total area of 1.0 square mile (2.7 km^{2}), of which 0.85 square miles (2.2 km^{2}) is land and 0.15 square miles (0.4 km^{2}), or 16.19%, is water.

New York State Route 16 runs through the center of Machias, leading north 5 miles (8 km) to Delevan and south 6 miles (10 km) to Franklinville.

== Demographics ==
Historical population
Census	Pop.	Note	%±
2020	505		—
U.S. Decennial Census
