= Freedom, New York =

- Town
- Location within New York Location within the United States
- Coordinates: 42°28′24″N 78°21′53″W
- Country: United States
- State: New York
- County: Cattaraugus

Government
  - Type: Town Council
  - Town Supervisor: Barbara D. George (D)
  - Town Council: Members' List: • Ann Marie Dixon (R); • Jeffrey A. Peterson (D); • Barbara A. Baker (D, R); • Charles M. Vince (D)

Area
  - Total: 40.67 sq mi (105.34 km^{2})
  - Land: 40.35 sq mi (104.50 km^{2})
  - Water: 0.32 sq mi (0.84 km^{2})
- Elevation: 1,686 ft (514 m)

Population (2020)
  - Total: 2,405
  - Estimate (2021): 2,244
  - Density: 57.4/sq mi (22.18/km^{2})
- Time zone: UTC-5 (Eastern (EST))
  - Summer (DST): UTC-4 (EDT)
- ZIP Codes: 14065 (Freedom); 14009 (Arcade); 14042 (Delevan); 14060 (Farmersville Station); 14133 (Sandusky)
- Area code: 716
- FIPS code: 36-009-27441
- GNIS feature ID: 0978973
- Website: www.freedomny.gov

Freedom is a town in Cattaraugus County, New York, United States. The population was 2,244 at the 2021 census. The town is in the northeast corner of Cattaraugus County.

== History ==
The first settlers arrived in December 1811. Historians have found no specific reason why the town was named Freedom.

The Town of Freedom was founded in 1820, composed of land from the "Town of Ischua" (now Franklinville). The northern portion of Freedom was transferred to Arcade in Wyoming County in 1841. Part of Freedom became the town of Yorkshire in 1844.

Salem Welsh Church is listed on the National Register of Historic Places.

== Geography ==
According to the United States Census Bureau, the town has a total area of 41.3 square miles (107.0 km^{2}), of which 41.0 square miles (106.2 km^{2}) is land and 0.35 square miles (0.9 km^{2}), or 0.80%, is water.

The north town line is the border of Wyoming County, and the east town line is the border of Allegany County.

New York State Route 98 is a major north–south highway through the town, and New York State Route 243 begins at the southeast town line.

=== Adjacent towns and areas ===
To the east is the town of Centerville in Allegany County, and to the west are the towns of Yorkshire and Machias. The north town line is formed with the town of Arcade in Wyoming County. The town of Farmersville is on the south.

== Demographics ==
Historical population
Census	Pop.	Note	%±
1830	1,505		—
1840	1,831		21.7%
1850	1,652		−9.8%
1860	1,424		−13.8%
1870	1,371		−3.7%
1880	1,312		−4.3%
1890	1,251		−4.6%
1900	1,209		−3.4%
1910	1,159		−4.1%
1920	1,016		−12.3%
1930	863		−15.1%
1940	947		9.7%
1950	1,031		8.9%
1960	1,059		2.7%
1970	1,355		28.0%
1980	1,840		35.8%
1990	2,018		9.7%
2000	2,493		23.5%
2010	2,405		−3.5%
2020	2,267		−5.7%
2021 (est.)	2,244		−1.0%
U.S. Decennial Census

As of the census of 2000, there were 2,493 people, 871 households, and 680 families residing in the town. The population density was 61.8 inhabitants per square mile (23.9/km^{2}). There were 1,033 housing units at an average density of 25.6 per square mile (9.9/km^{2}). The racial makeup of the town was 98.88% White, 0.16% African American, 0.08% Native American, 0.08% Asian, 0.08% from other races, and 0.72% from two or more races. Hispanic or Latino of any race were 0.76% of the population.

There were 871 households, out of which 39.8% had children under the age of 18 living with them, 63.5% were married couples living together, 7.9% had a female householder with no husband present, and 21.9% were non-families. 16.4% of all households were made up of individuals, and 6.3% had someone living alone who was 65 years of age or older. The average household size was 2.86 and the average family size was 3.20.

In the town, the population was spread out, with 29.5% under the age of 18, 8.0% from 18 to 24, 30.0% from 25 to 44, 23.0% from 45 to 64, and 9.5% who were 65 years of age or older. The median age was 35 years. For every 100 females, there were 103.3 males. For every 100 females age 18 and over, there were 103.9 males.

The median income for a household in the town was $34,654, and the median income for a family was $36,061. Males had a median income of $27,380 versus $22,188 for females. The per capita income for the town was $14,145. About 12.2% of families and 11.3% of the population were below the poverty line, including 10.3% of those under age 18 and 18.5% of those age 65 or over.

== Notable people ==
- Daniel F. Bakeman, last surviving veteran of the American Revolutionary War and party to the longest marriage on record
- Idwal H. Edwards, commander of United States Air Force in Europe

== Communities and locations in Freedom ==
- Camp Scouthaven – A Greater Niagara Frontier Council camp south of Freedom.
- Crystal Lake – A small lake adjacent to NY-98, south of Freedom village.
- Elton – a hamlet in the southwest corner of the town. It was previously called "Coles Settlement," after early pioneers, and later "Chelsea," the name that appears on maps in 1836 and 1840.
- Elton Station – A location south of Elton village.
- Fairview – A hamlet at the southeast corner of the town by the western terminus of NY Route 243.
- Freedom – The hamlet of Freedom is in the eastern part of town.
- Sandusky – a hamlet on Clear Creek near the northern town line on NY Route 98. The settlement was first occupied around 1824 by the construction of a tavern.
