= Farmersville, New York =

- Town
- Location within New York Location within the United States
- Coordinates: 42°24′4″N 78°23′56″W
- Country: United States
- State: New York
- County: Cattaraugus

Government
  - Type: Town Council
  - Town Supervisor: Joseph C. Brodka (R)
  - Town Council: Members' List: • William Kozak Sr. (R); • Kathleen Kellogg (); • Mark Rose Sr. (R); • Jerry Chmiel ()

Area
  - Total: 47.97 sq mi (124.25 km^{2})
  - Land: 47.83 sq mi (123.89 km^{2})
  - Water: 0.14 sq mi (0.36 km^{2})
- Elevation: 1,824 ft (556 m)

Population (2020)
  - Total: 1,081
  - Estimate (2021): 1,072
  - Density: 22.4/sq mi (8.63/km^{2})
- Time zone: UTC-5 (Eastern (EST))
  - Summer (DST): UTC-4 (EDT)
- ZIP Codes: 14060 (Farmersville Station); 14737 (Franklinville); 14042 (Delevan); 14065 (Freedom); 14101 (Machias)
- Area code: 716
- FIPS code: 36-009-25340
- GNIS feature ID: 0978952
- Website: www.farmersvilleny.org

Farmersville is a town located in the eastern border of Cattaraugus County, New York, United States. The population was 1,081 at the 2020 census.

== History ==
The area was first settled circa 1805, but no permanent settlement was made until approximately 1817. Farmersville became a town in 1821 from part of the "Town of Ischua" (now Franklinville).

The town gained notoriety because of the "Farmersville Garbage Scandal" during the 2000 New York State senatorial race between Rudy Giuliani (who later dropped out in favor of Rick Lazio) and Hillary Clinton. Giuliani had made a statement during a campaign press conference that any community that wanted to refuse taking garbage from New York City was free to do so. The town, eager to get out of a contract that they believed was harmful to them, took Giuliani up on his offer. Giuliani then claimed that he never made the statement and threatened the town with legal action in retaliation. The area where the landfill would have been placed has been the subject of significant controversy and numerous failed attempts to sell the property (Cattaraugus County, owners of the site, have put the parcel of land up for auction at its property auction every year, but the county's insistence on numerous restrictions on the land and its refusal to lower its minimum asking price have ensured it has gone unsold every year) since that time.

== Geography ==
According to the United States Census Bureau, the town has a total area of 48.0 square miles (124.2 km^{2}), of which 47.8 square miles (123.9 km^{2}) is land and 0.15 square miles (0.4 km^{2}), or 0.29%, is water.

Farmersville is located in northeastern Cattaraugus County. The eastern town line is the border of Allegany County.

New York State Route 16, New York State Route 98, and New York State Route 243 pass through the town.

=== Adjacent towns and areas ===
Farmersville is south of the town of Freedom and north of the towns of Lyndon and Franklinville. The east town line is shared with the town of Rushford in Allegany County. To the west is the town of Machias.

== Demographics ==
Historical population
Census	Pop.	Note	%±
1830	1,005		—
1840	1,294		28.8%
1850	1,554		20.1%
1860	1,389		−10.6%
1870	1,114		−19.8%
1880	1,128		1.3%
1890	1,082		−4.1%
1900	1,043		−3.6%
1910	948		−9.1%
1920	999		5.4%
1930	719		−28.0%
1940	778		8.2%
1950	733		−5.8%
1960	721		−1.6%
1970	754		4.6%
1980	978		29.7%
1990	869		−11.1%
2000	1,028		18.3%
2010	1,090		6.0%
2020	1,081		−0.8%
2021 (est.)	1,072		−0.8%
U.S. Decennial Census

As of the census of 2000, there were 1,028 people, 389 households, and 282 families residing in the town. The population density was 21.5 inhabitants per square mile (8.3/km^{2}). There were 656 housing units at an average density of 13.7 per square mile (5.3/km^{2}). The racial makeup of the town was 99.32% White, 0.19% African American, 0.29% Pacific Islander, 0.10% from other races, and 0.10% from two or more races. Hispanic or Latino of any race were 0.68% of the population.

There were 389 households, out of which 34.2% had children under the age of 18 living with them, 60.7% were married couples living together, 7.5% had a female householder with no husband present, and 27.5% were non-families. 19.8% of all households were made up of individuals, and 8.2% had someone living alone who was 65 years of age or older. The average household size was 2.64 and the average family size was 3.08.

In the town, the population was spread out, with 27.7% under the age of 18, 4.8% from 18 to 24, 31.6% from 25 to 44, 25.0% from 45 to 64, and 10.9% who were 65 years of age or older. The median age was 37 years. For every 100 females, there were 100.4 males. For every 100 females age 18 and over, there were 103.0 males.

The median income for a household in the town was $37,813, and the median income for a family was $42,500. Males had a median income of $31,389 versus $22,137 for females. The per capita income for the town was $16,291. About 6.8% of families and 11.1% of the population were below the poverty line, including 18.4% of those under age 18 and none of those age 65 or over.

== Notable people ==
- Hiram Bond, investor
- Lucy Salisbury Doolittle (1832-1908), philanthropist

== Communities and locations in Farmersville ==
- Fairview – A hamlet in the northeast corner of the town on NY Route 243. It is partly in Allegany County.
- Farmersville – The hamlet of Farmersville is on NY Route 98 near the middle of the town. It was first settled around 1817.
- Farmersville Station – A hamlet on Route 243 near the northern town line.
- Hardy Corners – A hamlet on County Road 46 at the eastern town line.
- Laidlaw – A hamlet northwest of Farmersville, located on County Road 80.
