= Billington Heights, New York =

- Census-designated place
- Location in Erie County and the state of New York
- Coordinates: 42°47′9″N 78°37′10″W
- Country: United States
- State: New York
- County: Erie
- Towns: Elma, Aurora

Area
  - Total: 3.17 sq mi (8.20 km^{2})
  - Land: 3.16 sq mi (8.18 km^{2})
  - Water: 0.0077 sq mi (0.02 km^{2})
- Elevation: 950 ft (290 m)

Population (2020)
  - Total: 1,748
  - Density: 553/sq mi (213.7/km^{2})
- Time zone: UTC-5 (Eastern (EST))
  - Summer (DST): UTC-4 (EDT)
- ZIP Codes: 14052 (East Aurora); 14059 (Elma)
- FIPS code: 36-06574
- GNIS feature ID: 1867394

Billington Heights is a hamlet and census-designated place (CDP) in the towns of Elma and Aurora in Erie County, New York, United States. As of the 2020 census, Billington Heights had a population of 1,748. It is part of the Buffalo–Niagara Falls Metropolitan Statistical Area.

== Geography ==
Billington Heights is located at 42°47′9″N 78°37′10″W (42.785709, -78.619419). It is bordered to the south by the village of East Aurora and to the north by Elma Center.

According to the United States Census Bureau, the CDP has a total area of 3.2 square miles (8.3 km^{2}), all land.

== Demographics ==
Historical population
| Census | Pop. | Note | %± |
|---|---|---|---|
| 2020 | 1,748 | | — |
U.S. Decennial Census

As of the census of 2000, there were 1,691 people, 664 households, and 515 families living in the community. The population density was 540.8 inhabitants per square mile (208.8/km^{2}). There were 684 housing units at an average density of 218.7 per square mile (84.4/km^{2}). The racial makeup of the CDP was 98.58% White, 0.47% African American, 0.59% Asian, 0.18% from other races, and 0.18% from two or more races. Hispanic or Latino of any race were 0.65% of the population.

There were 664 households, out of which 30.3% had children under the age of 18 living with them, 69.7% were married couples living together, 6.3% had a female householder with no husband present, and 22.3% were non-families. 19.9% of all households were made up of individuals, and 13.1% had someone living alone who was 65 years of age or older. The average household size was 2.53 and the average family size was 2.91.

In the area the population was spread out, with 23.6% under the age of 18, 4.0% from 18 to 24, 21.8% from 25 to 44, 29.8% from 45 to 64, and 20.8% who were 65 years of age or older. The median age was 45 years. For every 100 females, there were 95.7 males. For every 100 females age 18 and over, there were 89.7 males.

The median income for a household in the area was $56,154, and the median income for a family was $66,250. Males had a median income of $42,750 versus $22,305 for females. The per capita income for the CDP was $32,337. None of the families and 2.0% of the population were living below the poverty line, including no under eighteens and 3.3% of those over 64.

== Schools ==
The hamlet is covered by the East Aurora Union Free School District and the Iroquois Central School District.
