= Blakeley, New York =

Hamlet in New York, United States

Coordinates: 42°44′08″N 78°35′43″W

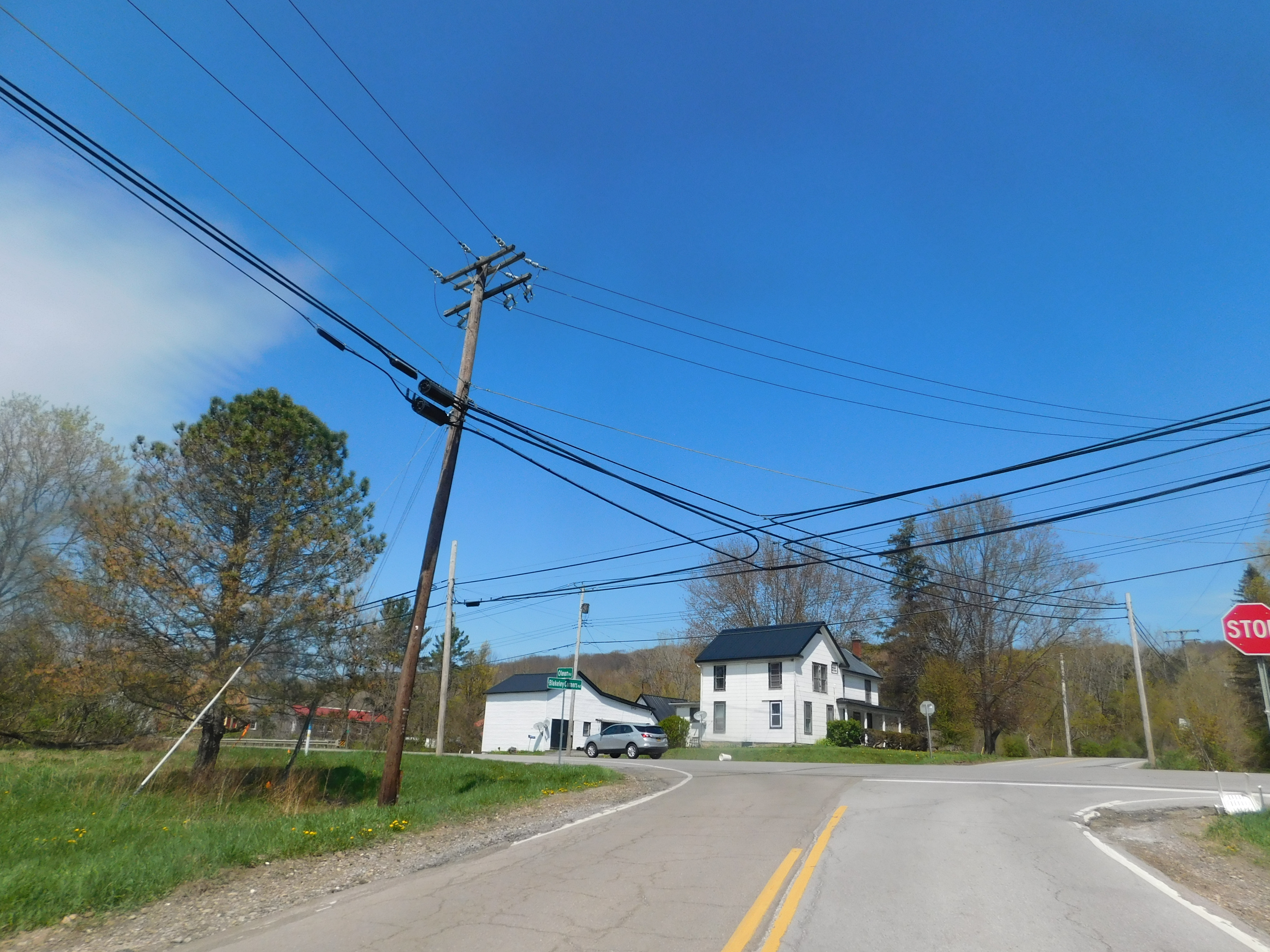
The hamlet of Blakeley in April 2021

Blakeley is a hamlet in the town of Aurora in Erie County, New York, United States. It is part of the Buffalo-Niagara Falls metropolitan area.

There is a northbound off-ramp and southbound on-ramp to New York State Route 400 in the north end of the hamlet. New York State Route 16 is a north-south road in the hamlet.

The hamlet is covered by the East Aurora Union Free School District.
