= County Route 574 (Erie County, New York) =

County route in New York

County Route 574
- Jamison Road
- Map of the Buffalo area with CR 574 highlighted in red

Route information
- Maintained by Erie County Highway Department
- Length: 5.28 mi (8.50 km)
- Existed: September 25, 1980–present

Major junctions
- West end: NY 16 / NY 78 in Elma
- NY 400 in Elma
- East end: Two Rod Road in Marilla

Location
- Country: United States
- State: New York
- County: Erie

Highway system
- County routes in New York; County Routes in Erie County
← NY 421	NY 422	→ NY 423

County Route 574 (CR 574) is an east–west county route north of East Aurora in Erie County, New York, in the United States. The western terminus of the route is at New York State Route 16 (NY 16) and NY 78 in the town of Elma. Its eastern terminus is at Two Rod Road, a state-maintained north–south highway in the town of Marilla. The entire length of CR 574 is named "Jamison Road".

Parts of CR 574 carried a state highway designation as early as 1930. By 1931, the entirety of CR 574 was designated as New York State Route 422. Ownership and maintenance of NY 422 was transferred from the state of New York to Erie County on April 1, 1980, and the NY 422 designation officially ceased to exist on September 25, 1980.

== Route description ==
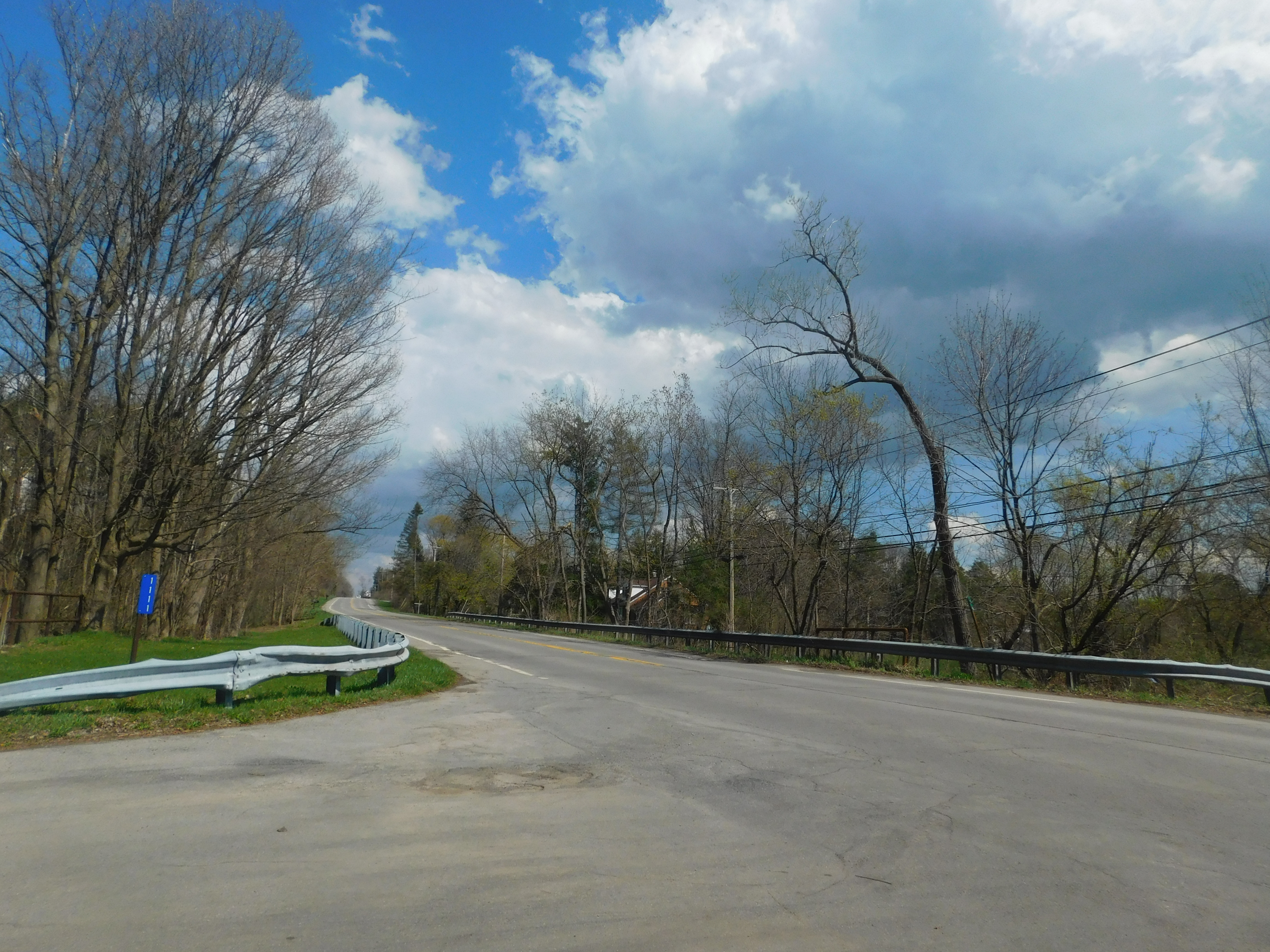
CR 574 in Elma from the railroad tracks

CR 574 begins at an intersection with NY 16 and NY 78 (Seneca Street) northwest of East Aurora in the town of Elma. The route heads eastward along Jamison Road, passing south of a predominantly residential neighborhood and north of a large industrial complex. The latter ends after 0.5 miles (0.8 km), and CR 574 continues on to an interchange with the Aurora Expressway (NY 400). CR 574 intersects Bowen Road (CR 242) and (CR 361) just east of the expressway.

As CR 574 approaches the hamlet of East Elma, it meets Girdle Road (CR 336). In East Elma itself, Jamison Road intersects Creek Road (CR 134) and Hemstreet Road (CR 172). Past East Elma, the land surrounding CR 574 becomes less developed and largely dominated by cultivated fields. CR 574 continues on through the open fields and into the town of Marilla, where it ends at a junction with Two Rod Road, a local arterial maintained by the New York State Department of Transportation as NY 954G, an unsigned reference route. Prior to 1982, Two Rod Road was NY 358.

== History ==
The portion of Jamison Road from Bowen Road to Maple Road was originally designated as part of NY 78 in the 1930 renumbering of state highways in New York. By the following year, the entirety of Jamison Road was designated as NY 422. NY 78 was realigned c. 1932 to follow a new routing between East Aurora and Depew while its former routing from East Aurora to Lancaster was redesignated as NY 78A. Officials removed the NY 78A designation, which overlapped NY 422 between Bowen Road and Maple Road, c. 1938.

On April 1, 1980, ownership and maintenance of NY 422 was transferred from the state of New York to Erie County as part of a larger highway maintenance swap between the two levels of government. The NY 422 designation was removed on September 25, 1980, allowing Jamison Road to become CR 574.

== Major intersections ==
The entire route is in Erie County.

Location	mi	km	Destinations	Notes
Elma	0.00	0.00	NY 16 / NY 78 (Seneca Street)	Western terminus
Elma	1.03	1.66	NY 400 – East Aurora, Buffalo	Interchange
Marilla	5.28	8.50	Two Rod Road (NY 954G) – Marilla, Wales Center	Eastern terminus; former alignment of NY 358
1.000 mi = 1.609 km; 1.000 km = 0.621 mi
