= Sandusky, New York =

- Hamlet
- Location within New York Location within the United States
- Coordinates: 42°29′45″N 78°23′04″W
- Country: United States
- State: New York
- County: Cattaraugus
- Elevation: 1,631 ft (497 m)
- Time zone: UTC-5 (Eastern (EST))
  - Summer (DST): UTC-4 (EDT)
- ZIP code: 14133
- Area code: 716
- GNIS feature ID: 964418

Sandusky is a hamlet in the town of Freedom in Cattaraugus County, New York, United States. The community is located along New York State Route 98, 3.3 miles (5.3 km) southeast of Arcade. Sandusky had a post office from December 23, 1830, until June 8, 1996; it still has its own ZIP code, 14133.
