= Louis Agricola Bauer =

American geophysicist, astronomer and magnetician

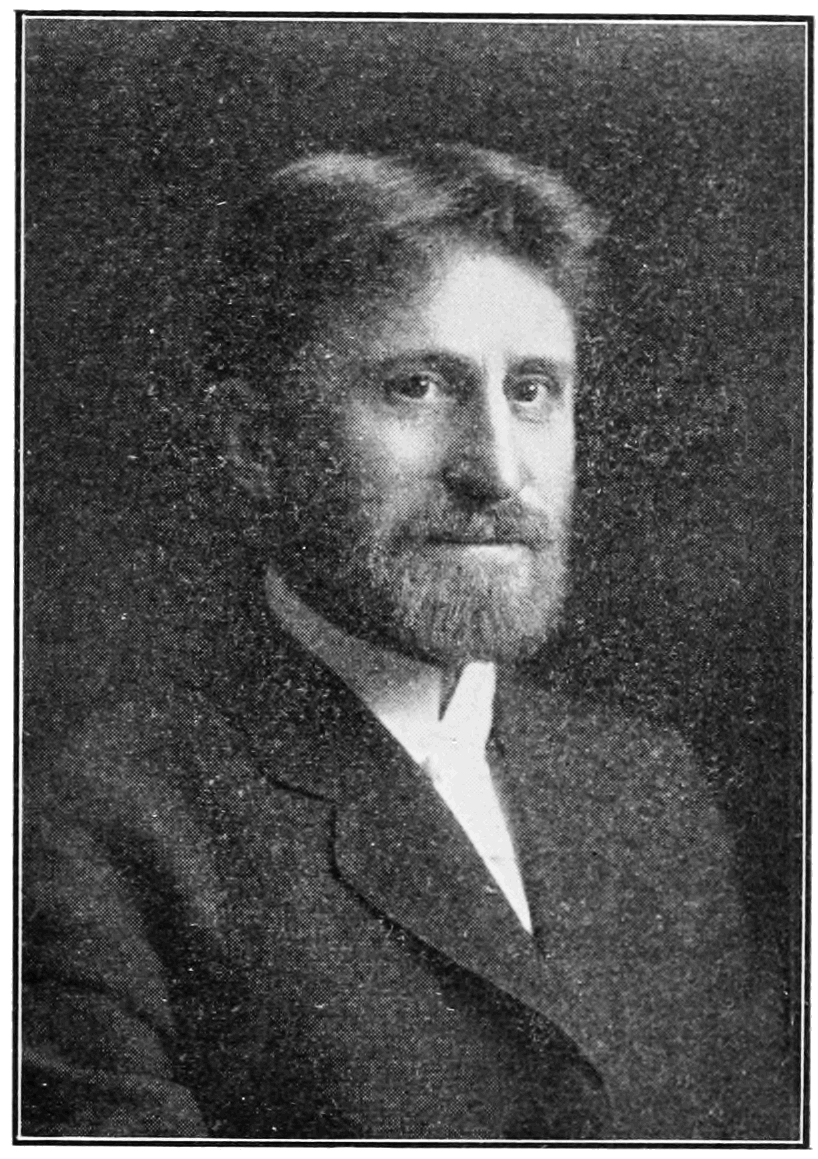
- 1910
- Born: January 26, 1865; Cincinnati, Ohio, U.S.
- Died: April 12, 1932 (aged 67); Washington, D.C., U.S.
- Education: University of Cincinnati
- Known for: Terrestrial Magnetism
- Relatives: Lucy Salisbury Doolittle (mother-in-law)
- Scientific career
- Fields: Geophysics, Astronomy

Louis Agricola Bauer (January 26, 1865 – April 12, 1932) was an American geophysicist, astronomer and magnetician.

Born in Cincinnati, Ohio, he graduated from the University of Cincinnati in 1888, and he immediately started work for the United States Coast and Geodetic Survey. During 1895 and 1896, he was instructor in mathematical physics at the University of Chicago, after which he worked in various positions at different locations. The most important of these was as the first director of the Department of Terrestrial Magnetism of the Carnegie Institution of Washington, which was established in 1904. In this position, he set up and carried out a large-scale program of two and a half decades to map the Earth's magnetic field on land and at sea in an attempt to provide accurate, up-to-date information about this important feature.

In 1908, he served as president of the Philosophical Society of Washington. The following year, he was elected to the American Philosophical Society. In 1910, Bauer received the Prix Charles Lagrange from the Académie royale des Sciences, des Lettres et des Beaux-Arts de Belgique. He was elected a Fellow of the American Academy of Arts and Sciences in 1912. He died in Washington, D.C., at the age of 67.

== Bibliography ==
His writings include:

- Beiträge zur Kenntniss des Wesens der Säcularvariation des Erdmagnetismus (1895)
- Vertical Earth-Air Electric Currents (1897)
- United States Magnetic Tables and Magnetic Charts for 1905 (1908)
- Land-Magnetic Observations, 1905-1910 (1913)
