= Lucy Salisbury Doolittle =

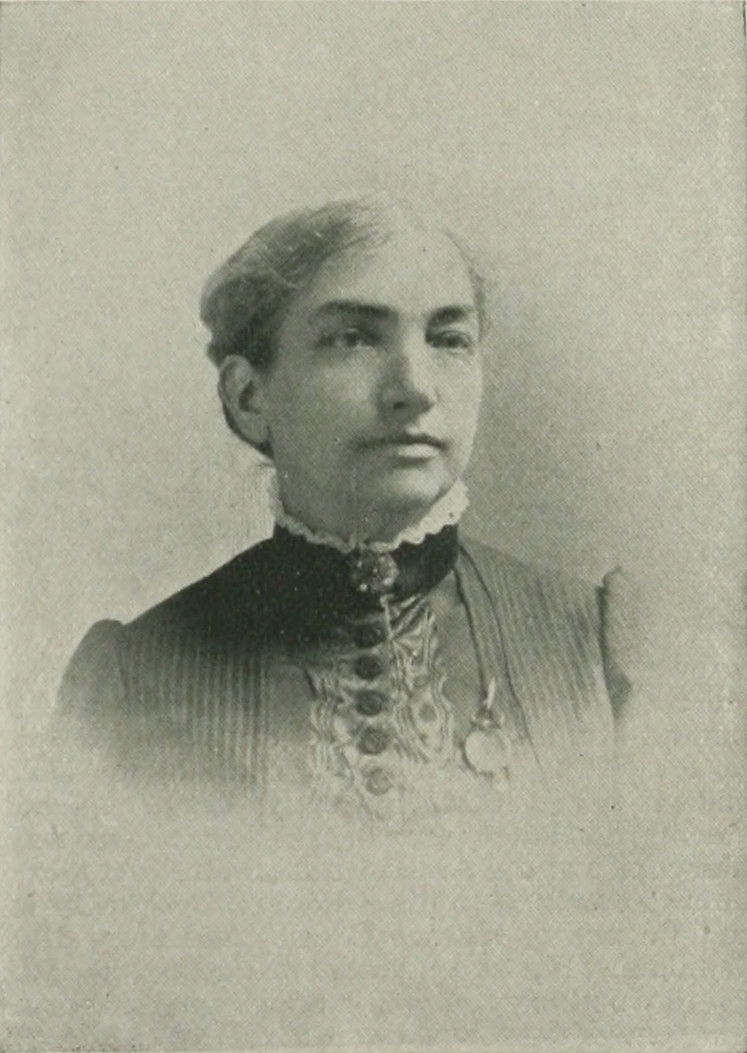
- "A Woman of the Century"
- Born: Lucy Salisbury; October 7, 1832; Farmersville, New York, U.S.
- Died: February 6, 1908 (aged 75); Linden, Montgomery County, Maryland, U.S.
- Resting place: Linden
- Education: Antioch College
- Occupations: philanthropist; trustee; clubwoman
- Spouse: Myrick H. Doolittle

Lucy Salisbury Doolittle (October 7, 1832 – February 6, 1908) was an American philanthropist and clubwoman. She was the first woman trustee of the Unitarian Church, was one of the founders of the Twentieth Century Club and president at one time of the board of children's guardians. In all her work for the poor and needy of Washington, D.C., she showed great executive ability and marked business talent.

== Early life and education ==
Lucy Salisbury was born in Farmersville, New York, October 7, 1832. On both sides, she came of New England stock, both families having moved to western New York in the early days of settlement. Not long after her birth, her parents moved to Castile, New York, where, with the exception of a few months, her early life was spent. She was eight years old when her mother died, and afterwards lived with her grandmother's sister. She had a good home, but was obliged to work hard and had little time for recreation. George Salisbury, who became a judge at Fort Collins, Colorado, was a brother.

In Castile, she received a common school education. Not being satisfied, at the age of 20, she went to Yellow Springs, Ohio, where she entered the preparatory department of Antioch College. There, she received the greater part of her education, having completed the work of the preparatory department and taken special collegiate studies.

== Career ==
In Antioch, she married Myrick H. Doolittle (d. 1913), a graduate of Antioch College and for a while, professor there. He was in the government service since President Lincoln's time and became chief mathematician of the United States Coast Survey. Their daughter, Adelia Frances, married American geophysicist, astronomer and magnetician, Louis Agricola Bauer in 1891.

In 1863, Doolittle went to Washington, D.C., her husband following a few months later. She at once entered into the work in the hospitals and was thus engaged until the fall of 1865, a part of the time as volunteer nurse, and during the remainder as agent for the Sanitary Commission. George Salisbury had been in the secret service of the government attached to Major General Eaton's staff during the civil war. Mrs. Doolittle and Gen. Eaton's wife were caught between Gen. Sheridan's and Gen. Early's contending forces at the battle of Winchester and subjected to dangers of flying shot and shell in that contest.

Immediately after the civil war, she became interested in the prisons and jails. It was her labor in them which brought to her a realization of the terrible condition of female convicts and convinced her of the need of suffrage for women, that they might have the power effectually to aid their suffering sisters of the lower classes. She was also, at the same time, conducting a sewing-school for African American women and girls who had flocked to Washington at the close of the war. It gave those women their first start in life. In that work, and also in that of the Freedmen's Bureau with which she was connected as agent, she saw so many homeless and friendless children that her sympathies were aroused for them. She and her husband helped to organize the Industrial Home School for poor white children of the District of Columbia, which became a flourishing institution supported by appropriations from Congress.

In 1875, her energies were enlisted in work for poor African American children, and she became a member of the National Association for the Relief of Destitute Colored Women and Children, with which she was connected ever since, being its treasurer for nine years and working at other times on various committees. A comparatively new branch of that institution was a Home for Colored Foundlings, in which Doolittle took an especial interest. Doolittle was a member of the Board of Children's Guardians from September 16, 1892, until October 5, 1901, and was president of the board from July 6, 1898, until November 3, 1900.

In the associated charities and in the charitable work of the Unitarian Church, she did good service.

== Death and legacy ==
Lucy Salisbury Doolittle died at Linden, Montgomery County, Maryland, February 6, 1908. Interment was at Linden. Her husband and two daughters, Mrs. L. A. (Adelia Frances) Bauer and Mrs. Mary D. Dawson, survived her.

The Lucy Salisbury Doolittle papers are held at the Library of Congress.
