= Salem Welsh Church =

Historic church in New York, United States

- U.S. National Register of Historic Places
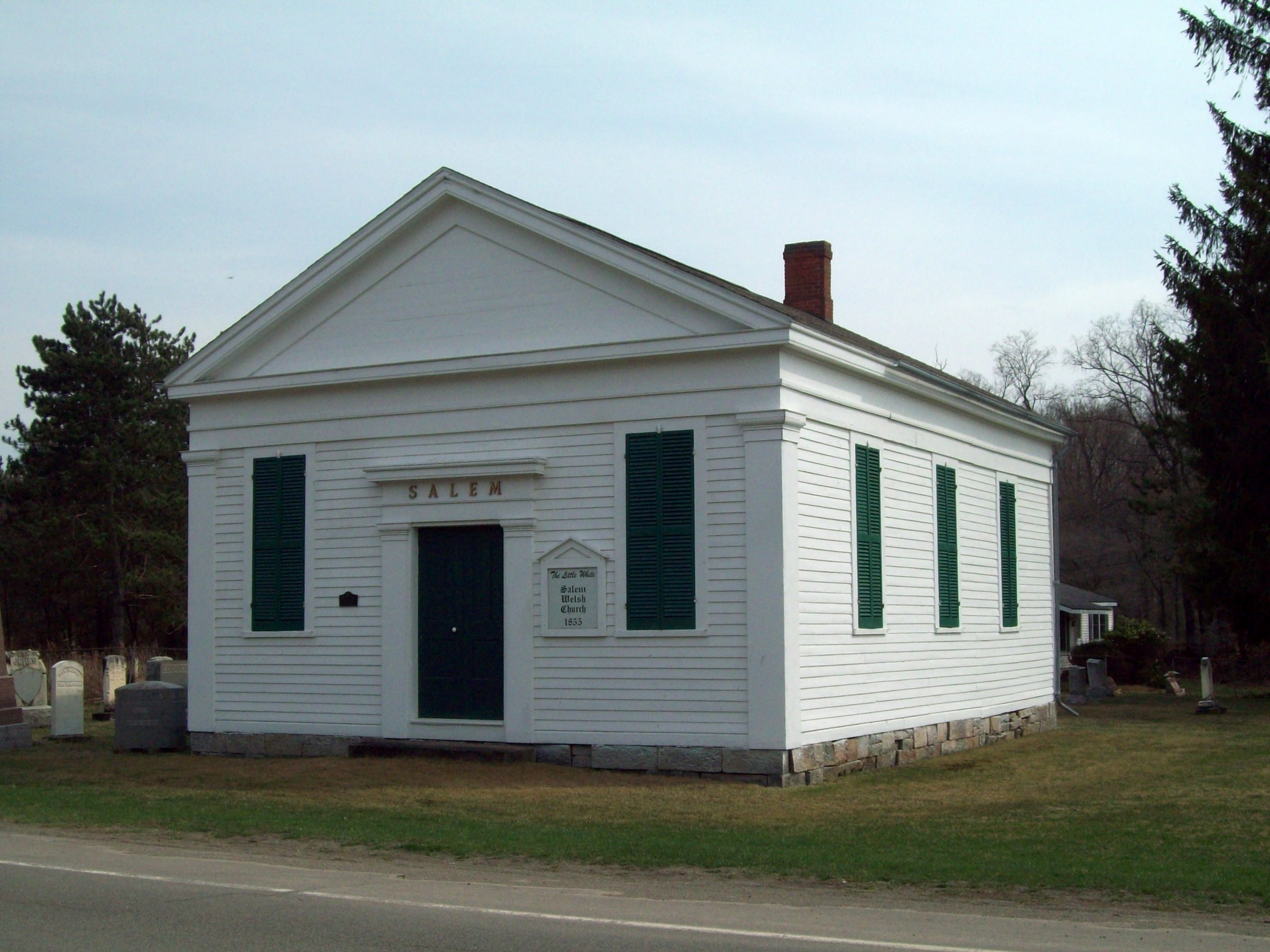
- Salem Welsh Church, April 2010

- Location within New York Location within the United States
- Location: 11141 NY 98 at jct. with Galen Hill Rd., Freedom, New York
- Coordinates: 42°29′12″N 78°21′31″W
- Built: 1854
- Architectural style: Greek Revival
- NRHP reference No.: 95001065
- Added to NRHP: September 07, 1995

Salem Welsh Church, or Salem Presbyterian Church, is a Greek Revival-style Presbyterian church at Freedom in Cattaraugus County, New York, constructed from 1854 to 1855.

It was built as the Calvinistic Methodist Church by the Welsh settlers who migrated to this area from Herkimer and Oneida Counties in the 1840s and 1850s. Regular services ended before World War I and the property has been maintained since 1926 by the Salem Cemetery Society, Inc.

It was listed on the National Register of Historic Places in 1995.
