= New York State Route 400 =

State highway in Erie County, New York, US

New York State Route 400
- Aurora Expressway
- Map of the Buffalo area with NY 400 highlighted in red

Route information
- Maintained by NYSDOT
- Length: 16.91 mi (27.21 km)
- Existed: January 1, 1970–present

Major junctions
- South end: NY 16 in Aurora
- US 20A / NY 78 in East Aurora; US 20 / NY 78 at the Elma–West Seneca line
- North end: I-90 / New York Thruway in West Seneca

Location
- Country: United States
- State: New York
- Counties: Erie

Highway system
- New York Highways; Interstate; US; State; Reference; Parkways
← NY 399	→ NY 401

New York State Route 400 (NY 400) is a 16.91-mile (27.21 km) freeway located within Erie County, New York, in the United States. The northwest end is connected to the New York State Thruway (Interstate 90 or I-90) and the southeast end terminates at NY 16 in the town of Aurora. NY 400, known as the Aurora Expressway, roughly parallels NY 16 between the two locations. It is most commonly used to carry traffic from Buffalo to the village of East Aurora, where Fisher-Price and Moog, Inc are headquartered. It is a busy commuter route to the southern suburbs. NY 400 is signed as a north–south route, although about half of the route runs more east–west.

The northwest end of NY 400 is in the southern part of Buffalo at the Thruway. The southeast end is north of the hamlet of South Wales, which is located in the town of Wales. At this end, the route connects to Olean Road and continues south as NY 16. The highway crosses Cazenovia Creek just before ending.

== Route description ==
NY 400 begins northwest of the hamlet of South Wales in the town of Aurora; however, South Wales, situated less than 0.5 miles (0.8 km) southeast of the route's end, is located in the adjacent town of Wales. At its southern end, NY 400 splits off of Olean Road, taking with it NY 16 which occupies Olean Road to the south. The two routes head north-northwest from here as the Aurora Expressway through rural areas in the town of Aurora. After passing by Emery Park, NY 16 leaves the expressway back onto Olean Road on one of three junctions that only allow access in one cardinal direction, this one to the south as a northbound exit and southbound entrance. NY 400 continues heading in a primarily northward direction; however, it briefly turns back in a slight east direction to avoid the village of East Aurora.

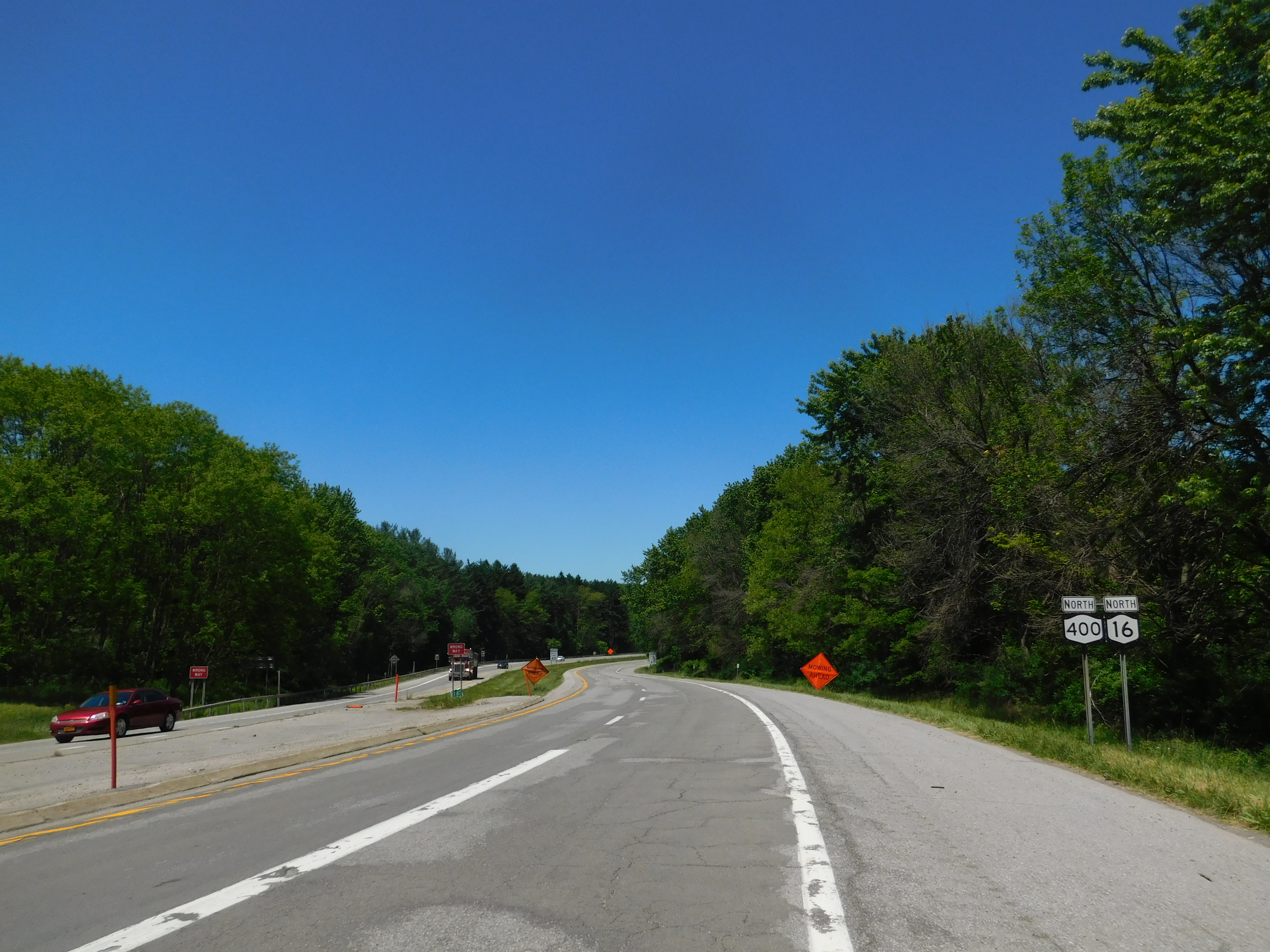
NY 400 and NY 16 at the beginning of NY 400 in Wales

Remaining rural, NY 400 crosses just to the east of East Aurora, encountering U.S. Route 20A (US 20A) and NY 78 (Big Tree Road) at a northbound entrance and southbound exit. North of here, entering the town of Elma, it turns to the west to meet with Maple Street at the final single-direction junction, a northbound entrance and southbound exit. The expressway then turns northwest to intersect with Jamison Road (formerly NY 422) by way of a full diamond interchange. NY 400 also passes a small industrial area containing manufacturing plants for Moog, Inc, Motorola, Servotronics, and Steuben Foods located on Maple Street and Jamison Road.

NY 400 continues northwest, paralleling NY 16 and NY 78 on Seneca Street and becoming more suburban and heavily trafficked. On the Elma–West Seneca town line, a full cloverleaf interchange occurs with US 20 and NY 78 on Transit Road, just north of the Seneca Street/Transit Road intersection. The expressway turns in a more western direction here, as well, though there is still a slight deflection to the north.

The expressway continues to parallel NY 16 (Seneca Street), now running between NY 16 to the south and the North America Center industrial park to the north. The Norfolk Southern Railway separates NY 400 from the industrial park. It intersects with NY 277 (Union Road), again just north of the NY 16 (Seneca Street) intersection with the road. After a final exit for NY 16, it encounters the New York State Thruway (I-90) at the beginning of I-90's eight-lane section through Buffalo, signifying its high use during rush hour.

== History ==
Construction began on the Aurora Expressway in the late 1960s and concluded in the early 1970s. The entirety of the expressway, then incomplete, was designated as NY 400 on January 1, 1970.

The intersection where NY 400 terminates at NY 16 in South Wales has been reconfigured over time. When the expressway was first constructed, the flow of traffic along Olean Road was unimpeded while traffic from NY 400 was forced to merge with NY 16 at a sharp angled intersection. The junction has since been altered so that southbound traffic on NY 400 continues onto NY 16 south with no merging required while commuters on NY 16 north are guided onto the expressway rather than onto Olean Road. Olean Road, however, is still accessible by way of a four-way intersection with Richardson Road just west of the former junction.

== Exit list ==
The entire route is in Erie County. All exits are unnumbered.

Location	mi	km	Destinations	Notes
Town of Aurora	0.00	0.00	NY 16 south / Olean Road (NY 951V north) – Holland, Olean, East Aurora	Southern terminus; southern end of NY 16 concurrency
Town of Aurora	1.99	3.20	NY 16 north / Olean Road (NY 951V south) – East Aurora	Northbound exit and southbound entrance; northern end of NY 16 concurrency; northern terminus of unsigned NY 951V Blakeley, New York
Town of Aurora	4.05	6.52	US 20A / NY 78 – East Aurora	Southbound exit and northbound entrance
Elma	7.12	11.46	CR 241 (Maple Street)	Southbound exit and northbound entrance
Elma	8.39	13.50	CR 574 (Jamison Road) – Elma	Former routing of NY 422
Elma–West Seneca line	11.96	19.25	US 20 / NY 78 (Transit Road)	
West Seneca	14.98	24.11	NY 277 (Union Road)	
West Seneca	16.40	26.39	NY 16 (Seneca Street) – West Seneca	
Buffalo	16.91	27.21	I-90 / New York Thruway – Buffalo, Erie	Northern terminus; exit 54 on I-90 / Thruway
1.000 mi = 1.609 km; 1.000 km = 0.621 mi: Concurrency terminus; Incomplete access
