= Lime Lake, New York =

- Census-designated place
- Location within New York Location within the United States
- Coordinates: 42°26′4″N 78°28′45″W
- Country: United States
- State: New York
- County: Cattaraugus
- Town: Machias

Area
  - Total: 2.64 sq mi (6.85 km^{2})
  - Land: 2.38 sq mi (6.16 km^{2})
  - Water: 0.27 sq mi (0.69 km^{2})
- Elevation: 1,660 ft (510 m)

Population (2020)
  - Total: 836
  - Density: 351.6/sq mi (135.75/km^{2})
- Time zone: UTC-5 (Eastern (EST))
  - Summer (DST): UTC-4 (EDT)
- ZIP Codes: 14042 (Delevan); 14101 (Machias)
- FIPS code: 36-42345

Lime Lake is a hamlet and census-designated place (CDP) in the northeast part of the town of Machias, in Cattaraugus County, New York, United States. As of the 2020 census, Lime Lake had a population of 836. Prior to the 2010 census, the area was delineated as part of the Lime Lake-Machias CDP.

== Geography ==
Lime Lake is located in the northeast corner of the town of Machias at 42°26′4″N 78°28′45″W. It consists of development that surrounds a small water body named Lime Lake, about 1 mile (1.6 km) in diameter. The area is bordered to the south by the main hamlet of Machias.

According to the United States Census Bureau, the Lime Lake CDP has a total area of 2.6 square miles (6.8 km^{2}), of which 2.4 square miles (6.2 km^{2}) is land and 0.27 square miles (0.7 km^{2}), or 10.06%, is water. The outlet of Lime Lake flows north to Elton Creek in Delevan, which then continues north to Cattaraugus Creek, a west-flowing tributary of Lake Erie. Less than one mile south of Lime Lake and only a few feet higher is the drainage divide between the Great Lakes watershed to the north and the Mississippi River watershed to the south: Ischua Creek flows south to Olean Creek, a tributary of the Allegheny River, then the Ohio River, and finally the Mississippi.

New York State Route 16 and Cattaraugus County Route 70 connect Lime Lake to Machias.

== Demographics ==
Historical population
Census	Pop.	Note	%±
2020	836		—
U.S. Decennial Census

== Notable people ==
- Jeffrey J. Miller, author and historian
- Jim Murray, Pulitzer Prize winning sportswriter, worked as a dishwasher/busboy at the Lime Lake Hotel during the 1930s.
