= Elmhurst 1925 =

Food and beverage company

Elmhurst Milked, LLC
- Industry: Beverage
- Predecessor: Elmhurst Dairy
- Founded: 1925 in Queens, New York
- Headquarters: Elma, New York
- Services: Plant milks
- Owner: Henry Schwartz

Elmhurst 1925 (officially Elmhurst Milked, LLC) is a plant-based food and beverage company located in Elma, New York. The company manufactures and sells non-dairy, plant-based milks made from nuts, grains, and seeds. The first four nutmilks – almond, cashew, hazelnut, and walnut – debuted at Natural Products Expo West in March 2017. A number of additional products have launched since, including their line of unsweetened plant milks made with only two or three ingredients, award winning barista editions, dairy-free creamers, and single serve ready-to-drink options.

== History ==
Elmhurst was founded in Queens, New York, in 1925. Current owner Henry Schwartz’s father and uncle started the company, which became Elmhurst Dairy, in their father’s milk house in the Elmhurst neighborhood. The Schwartz brothers moved to the Jamaica neighborhood in the 1930s. Here they linked with their brother-in-law, who had a farm of 200 cows in Middle Village, and set up a manufacturing plant.

The Jamaica site housed Elmhurst Dairy until its closure in 2016. Schwartz cited ongoing losses, stating that the family had kept the plant open “long past the years that it was economically viable.” It was the last remaining fluid milk plant in New York City.

Elmhurst Dairy rebranded itself as Elmhurst 1925, and switched its focus from dairy to plant-based milks. It moved its manufacturing operation to a new 30,000 square foot plant, adjacent to sister company Steuben Foods, in 2017. A line of nutmilks launched in March 2017.

== Products ==
Elmhurst 1925 currently offers a wide range of products and continues to add to this portfolio regularly. Milked Almonds, Cashews, Walnuts, and Hazelnuts were originally introduced at Natural Products Expo West in March 2017. A number of additional Elmhurst Milked products were shown at Natural Products Expo East in September 2017: Milked Oats, Brown Rice, Peanuts, and Peanuts with Chocolate; and unsweetened versions of Milked Almonds and Hazelnuts. These launched in January 2018. Elmhurst Milked Peanuts is the only packaged peanut-based milk on the market.

All products are packaged in 32 fluid ounce (946 mL) multi-serve cartons, and sold in both retail stores nationally as well as being available directly through their e-commerce site in the contiguous US. Elmhurst's product line is vegan, lactose-free, kosher, and non-GMO certified.

== Process - HydroRelease ==
Elmhurst uses a proprietary process, which it calls the HydroRelease method. Dr. Cheryl Mitchell developed the process over five years, at a California research facility purchased in 2001. Previously, she had developed Rice Dream for Imagine Foods. In 2015, Mitchell partnered with Elmhurst and Steuben Foods owner Henry Schwartz to bring the technology to market on a large scale. This led to the opening of Elmhurst's cold-milling plant in Elma, New York, in 2017.

According to Mitchell, "milking" begins with nuts, grains, and seeds, rather than a formulation to which these ingredients are added later. The process separates the source ingredient into its individual components, which include protein, fat, fiber, and micronutrients. These components are then put back together, forming a milk-like liquid which retains the nutritional profile of the original nut, grain, or seed. No gums, stabilizers, or emulsifiers are used. Because the ingredients are separated, fiber may be left-out when the ingredients are recombined and sold for other uses, such as making pasta.

Schwartz claims that Elmhurst's milked nuts products contain up to four times the nuts of other nutmilk brands.

== Certification and verification ==
- Elmhurst Milked Oats bears the 100% Whole Grain Stamp. Granted by the Oldways Whole Grains Council, the stamp verifies that 100% of the grain in the product is whole grain, and there are at least 16 grams whole grain per serving. Elmhurst Milked Oats is labeled as having 20 grams whole grain per serving.
- All Elmhurst products are kosher-certified, with classification as pareve, by the Orthodox Union.
- All Elmhurst products are certified Non-GMO by the Non-GMO Project.
- All Elmhurst cartons bear the Forest Stewardship Council trademark.
- All Elmhurst cartons bear a recycle symbol linked to the Carton Council. The Carton Council was formed in 2009 by SIG Combibloc, which supplies Elmhurst Milked packaging, and three other leading paperboard carton manufacturers.

== Awards and recognition ==
- VegNews, in its 2017 Veggie Awards, recognized Elmhurst 1925 as Company of the Year.
- VegWorld Magazine named Elmhurst 1925 Best in Show among vegan milks at Natural Products Expo East 2017.
- Elmhurst 1925 won New Hope Network's Natural Products Expo East 2017 NEXTY Award for Best New Beverage.
- Clean Eating Magazine awarded Elmhurst 1925 the 2019 Clean Choice Award.
- VegNews awarded Elmhurst 1925 Best New Vegan Product at New Hope Network's Natural Products Expo West 2019.
- Clean Eating Magazine awarded Elmhurst 1925 the 2020 Clean Choice Award.
- The National Restaurant Show awarded Elmhurst 1925 the 2020 FABI Award for their Barista Editions.
