= Irving Stringham =

American mathematician (1847–1909)

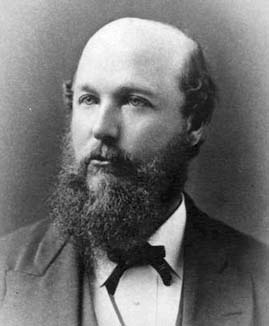
- Born: December 10, 1847; Yorkshire, New York, U.S.
- Died: October 5, 1909 (aged 61); Berkeley, California, U.S.
- Education: Harvard College; Johns Hopkins University
- Scientific career
- Fields: Mathematics
- Workplaces: University of California at Berkeley
- Doctoral advisor: James Joseph Sylvester

Washington Irving Stringham (December 10, 1847 – October 5, 1909) was an American mathematician born in Yorkshire, New York. He was the first person to denote the natural logarithm as $\ln(x)$ where $x$ is its argument. The use of $\ln(x)$ in place of $\log_e(x)$ is commonplace in digital calculators today.

"In place of $^{e}\log$ we shall henceforth use the shorter symbol $\ln$, made up of the initial letters of logarithm and of natural or Napierian."

Stringham graduated from Harvard College in 1877. He earned his PhD from Johns Hopkins University in 1880. His dissertation was titled Regular Figures in N-dimensional Space under his advisor James Joseph Sylvester.

In 1881 he was in Schwartzbach, Saxony, when he submitted an article on finite groups found in the quaternion algebra.

Stringham began his professorship in mathematics at Berkeley in 1882. In 1893 in Chicago, his paper Formulary for an Introduction to Elliptic Functions was read at the International Mathematical Congress held in connection with the World's Columbian Exposition. In 1900 he was an Invited Speaker at the ICM in Paris.

== Personal life ==
Irving married Martha Sherman Day. The couple raised a daughter, Martha Sherman Stringham, (March 5, 1891- August 7, 1967).

== Publications ==
- I. Stringham (1879) The Quaternion Formulae for Quantification of Curves, Surfaces, and Solids, and for Barycenters, American Journal of Mathematics 2:205–7.
- I. Stringham (1901) On the geometry of planes in a parabolic space of four dimensions, Transactions of the American Mathematical Society 2:183–214.
- I. Stringham (1905) "A geometric construction for quaternion products", Bulletin of the American Mathematical Society 11(8):437–9.
