= Idwal H. Edwards =

United States Air Force general

General Idwal H. Edwards
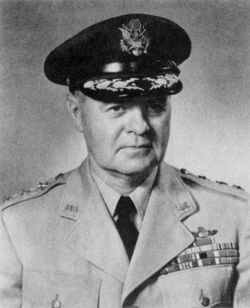
- Idwal H. Edwards
- Born: 5 April 1895; Freedom, New York
- Died: 25 November 1981 (aged 86) Alexandria, Virginia
- Allegiance: United States
- Branch: United States Air Force
- Service years: 1915–1954
- Rank: Lieutenant general
- Commands: United States Air Force in Europe
- Wars/Actions: World War II World war 1 – Europe
- Awards: (See below)
- Spouse: Katharine (nee Bierman)
- Children: 2 daughters Ann Louise and Katharine
- Other work: (See below)

Idwal Hubert Edwards CBE (5 April 1895 – 25 November 1981), born in Freedom, New York, was a distinguished United States Army and later United States Air Force officer who reached the rank of lieutenant general. He was a distinguished commander, rated command pilot, combat observer and aircraft observer.

== Early life and education ==
His father was Daniel Edwards, a native of Wales, Pennsylvania, and a Baptist minister who served churches across Pennsylvania. Idwal Edwards entered Bloomsburg State Normal School in December 1911 to prepare for a teaching career, graduating with the class of 24 June 1914. He was honored at commencement for excelling in both scholarship and teaching ability.

Before joining the military, Edwards became principal of schools in Sterling, near Scranton, and entered Brown University in fall 1916. According to the Welsh Nation newspaper, Idwal Edwards was a Welsh-speaker, Cymraeg being his family language.

After joining the Army and gaining his commission as an officer, Edwards attended the Command and General Staff School before attending the Army War College in 1938.

== Military career ==
He entered the Army in 1917 in the Infantry branch, and in February 1918 was transferred to the Army Air Service, a part of the Signal Corps at the time. Edwards was later chief of staff for the European Theater of Operations during a period of World War II. He helped create the Code of Conduct for U.S. servicemen who become prisoners of war at the direction of President Dwight D. Eisenhower because of the "brain washing" of American prisoners during the Korean War.

Edwards is credited as a force that helped to bring the practice of segregation in the military to an end. While assigned as deputy chief of staff for personnel, concerning the issue of integrating the military, Edwards stated segregation was unnecessary, promised eventual integration, but also stated that segregation remained Air Force policy. As evidence of progress, Edwards pointed to the peaceful integration of black officers in training at Randolph Field. Edwards further stated that air force policy was considered "the best way to make this thing work under present conditions." Later Edwards told Secretary of the Air Force W. Stuart Symington, perhaps some recommendation "looking toward the integration of whites and negroes in the same units may be forthcoming" from the Air Board's study of racial policy which was to commence the first week in May. 26 July 1948, President Harry S. Truman's executive order eventually ended racial segregation in the armed forces with the last all-Black unit disbanded in 1952.

=== Assignments ===
- 1917 – Enlisted in the Army
- 1918 – Transferred to the Army Air Corps
- Until World War II, assigned in the Philippines, in Hawaii, and at many stations in the continental United States. He attended various service schools, including the Command and General Staff School, Fort Leavenworth, Kansas, and the Army War College, Washington, D.C. graduating from the latter in 1938.
- 1941 – Assumed command of basic flying school at Randolph Field, San Antonio, Texas.
- 1943 – Served as chief of staff of the European Theater of Operation (ETO)
- 1944 to 1945 – Deputy Commander of the U.S. Air Force in the Mediterranean theater
- March 1946 to August 1947 – General Edwards was commanding general of the United States Air Forces in Europe
- August 1947 to March 1950 – Designated Deputy Chief of Staff, personnel (organization and training), at Air Force headquarters in Washington, D.C.
- March 1950 to 23 July 1951 – Deputy Chief of Staff, operations, at Air Force headquarters in Washington, D.C.
- 23 July 1951 to 23 February 1953 – Appointed commandant of the Air University at Maxwell Air Force Base, Alabama
- 23 February 1953 – Retired from active duty.
- 3 February 1954 – General Edwards was called back to active duty and returned to Air Force headquarters for duty with the Office of the Deputy Chief of Staff, Personnel, as President of a special board of officers.
- 9 March 1954 – Retired again from active duty.

=== Promotions ===
Insignia	Rank	Date
	Lieutenant general	in retirement
	Major general	19 February 1948
	Brigadier general	24 May 1942
	Colonel	21 January 1941
	Lieutenant colonel	17 June 1938
	Major	1 August 1935
	Captain	1 July 1920
	First lieutenant	20 June 1918
	Second lieutenant	15 August 1917

=== Awards and decorations ===
Air Force Distinguished Service Medal with OLC
Legion of Merit

Foreign awards include:
Commander of the Order of the British Empire
Commander of the French Legion of Honour

== Personal life and retirement ==
In retirement, Edwards was president of the Retired Officers Association, and president of the Army & Navy Club in Washington.

Edwards lived in Arlington, Virginia, since retiring from the air force, died of cardio-respiratory failure at the Woodbine nursing home in Alexandria, Virginia. Survivors included his wife, Katharine (née Bierman), one daughter, Katharine Picek, three sisters, four grandchildren, and one great-grandchild. He was buried in Arlington National Cemetery.

== See also ==
- List of commanders of USAFE
- Notable people from Freedom, New York
