= Lime Lake (New York) =

Reservoir in New York, United States

- Location within New York Location within the United States
- Location: Cattaraugus County, New York, United States
- Coordinates: 42°25′38.78″N 78°28′45.16″W
- Primary outflows: Lime Lake Outlet
- Basin countries: United States
- Surface area: 154 acres (0.62 km^{2})
- Average depth: 10 feet (3.0 m)
- Max. depth: 40 feet (12 m)
- Surface elevation: 1,637 feet (499 m)
- Settlements: Lime Lake, New York

Lime Lake is a reservoir in Cattaraugus County, New York, in the United States. Lime Lake is an English translation of the Native American name Tecarnowundo.

Fish species present in the lake are yellow perch, bluegill, pumpkinseed sunfish, carp, rock bass, largemouth bass, walleye, tiger muskie, and black bullhead. There is a state owned carry down launch located off Potter Avenue on the east shore.

== See also ==
- List of lakes in New York
