= East Elma, New York =

Hamlet in New York, United States

Coordinates: 42°48′18″N 78°35′39″W

East Elma is a hamlet in the town of Elma in Erie County, New York, United States.
