= Spring Brook, New York =

Founded April 28, 1848

Coordinates: 42°49′05″N 78°40′32″W

Spring Brook is a hamlet in the town of Elma in Erie County, New York, United States.
