= Machias, New York =

- Town
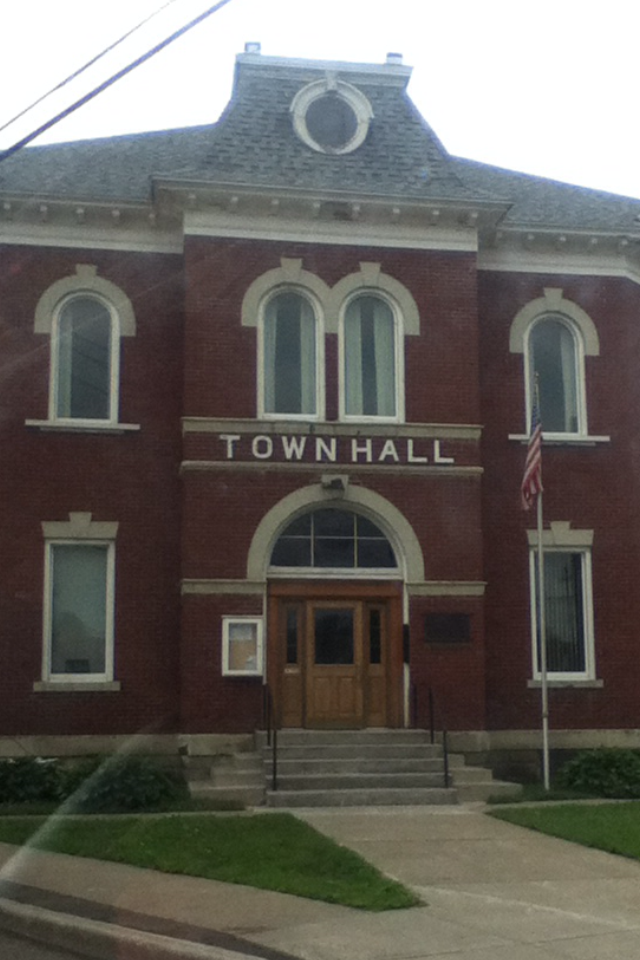

- Location within New York Location within the United States
- Coordinates: 42°24′28″N 78°29′56″W
- Country: United States
- State: New York
- County: Cattaraugus

Area
  - Total: 41.08 sq mi (106.39 km^{2})
  - Land: 40.43 sq mi (104.71 km^{2})
  - Water: 0.65 sq mi (1.68 km^{2})
- Elevation: 1,699 ft (518 m)

Population (2020)
  - Total: 2,309
  - Estimate (2021): 2,297
  - Density: 57.1/sq mi (22.05/km^{2})
- Time zone: UTC-5 (Eastern (EST))
  - Summer (DST): UTC-4 (EDT)
- ZIP Codes: 14101 (Machias); 14042 (Delevan); 14171 (West Valley); 14737 (Franklinville)
- Area code: 716
- FIPS code: 36-009-44237
- GNIS feature ID: 0979180
- Website: www.machiasny.gov

Machias is a town in Cattaraugus County, New York, United States. The population was 2,309 at the 2020 census. Machias is an interior town in the northeast quadrant of the county. It is northeast of the city of Salamanca.

== History ==
The area that would become Machias was first settled circa 1813, and the town was established in 1827 from the town of Yorkshire. In 1847, Machias was increased by additional territory from Yorkshire. Machias received its name from Maine settlers.

== Geography ==
The town is located at 42°25′10″N 78°29′40″W.

According to the United States Census Bureau, Machias has a total area of 41.1 square miles (106.4 km^{2}), of which 40.4 square miles (104.7 km^{2}) is land and 0.66 square miles (1.7 km^{2}), or 1.58%, is water.

New York State Route 16 intersects New York State Route 242 at Machias village.

The town of Machias straddles the border of the Mississippi River drainage basin, with the waters of Lime Lake flowing north and then west via Cattaraugus Creek to Lake Erie and eventually the Saint Lawrence Seaway to the Atlantic Ocean, while the waters of Ischua Creek, less than 1 mile (1.6 km) south of Lime Lake, flow south towards the Allegheny River and eventually the Mississippi and Gulf of Mexico.

Ischua Creek flows past the south part of Machias village.

=== Adjacent towns and areas ===
Machias is south of the town of Yorkshire and north of the town of Franklinville. The towns of Farmersville and Freedom are on the east and the towns of Ashford and Ellicottville are on the west.

== Demographics ==
Historical population
| Census | Pop. | Note | %± |
|---|---|---|---|
| 1830 | 737 | | — |
| 1840 | 1,085 | | 47.2% |
| 1850 | 1,342 | | 23.7% |
| 1860 | 1,275 | | −5.0% |
| 1870 | 117 | | −90.8% |
| 1880 | 1,545 | | 1,220.5% |
| 1890 | 1,536 | | −0.6% |
| 1900 | 1,557 | | 1.4% |
| 1910 | 1,529 | | −1.8% |
| 1920 | 1,431 | | −6.4% |
| 1930 | 1,255 | | −12.3% |
| 1940 | 1,362 | | 8.5% |
| 1950 | 1,341 | | −1.5% |
| 1960 | 1,390 | | 3.7% |
| 1970 | 1,749 | | 25.8% |
| 1980 | 2,058 | | 17.7% |
| 1990 | 2,338 | | 13.6% |
| 2000 | 2,482 | | 6.2% |
| 2010 | 2,375 | | −4.3% |
| 2020 | 2,309 | | −2.8% |
| 2021 (est.) | 2,297 | ▼ | −0.5% |
U.S. Decennial Census

As of the 2000 census, there were 2,482 people, 906 households, and 654 families residing in the town. The population density was 61.1 inhabitants per square mile (23.6/km^{2}). There were 1,354 housing units at an average density of 33.3 per square mile (12.9/km^{2}). The racial makeup of the town was 97.78% White, 0.16% African American, 0.44% Native American, 0.08% Asian, 0.32% from other races, and 1.21% from two or more races. Hispanic or Latino of any race were 1.01% of the population.

There were 906 households, out of which 32.9% had children under the age of 18 living with them, 57.6% were married couples living together, 7.5% had a female householder with no husband present, and 27.8% were non-families. 22.7% of all households were made up of individuals, and 10.4% had someone living alone who was 65 years of age or older. The average household size was 2.62 and the average family size was 3.03.

In the town, the population was spread out, with 25.5% under the age of 18, 7.5% from 18 to 24, 26.6% from 25 to 44, 24.3% from 45 to 64, and 16.2% who were 65 years of age or older. The median age was 40 years. For every 100 females, there were 99.8 males. For every 100 females age 18 and over, there were 93.9 males.

The median income for a household in the town was $33,553, and the median income for a family was $39,301. Males had a median income of $30,217 versus $21,652 for females. The per capita income for the town was $14,367. About 10.6% of families and 12.8% of the population were below the poverty line, including 13.7% of those under age 18 and 19.1% of those age 65 or over.

== Communities and locations in the Town of Machias ==
- Bakerstand – A hamlet in the southwest part of the town on NY Route 242
- Bird – A hamlet in the southwest part of the town, north of Bakerstand
- Brewers Corners – A location northwest of Machias village on County Road 20
- Fancy Tract – A location on the west town line
- Frog Pond – A small body of water north of Lime Lake village
- Lime Lake – The hamlet was settled around a small lake, which itself is called Lime Lake. Lime Lake is on NY Route 16 in the northeast part of the town, north of Machias village. The lake received its name from the shells found on its bottom. The lake is almost completely surrounded by vacation and year-round cottages.
- Lime Lake Outlet – A stream flowing out the north end of Lime Lake to Cattaraugus Creek
- Machias (earlier "Machias Five Corners" and "Chickasaw") – the principal hamlet and business district in the town is located on NY Route 16 in the east part of the town. Besides Lime Lake, many other smaller bodies of water surround the village. The village was first settled around 1820. The early name regarding five corners refers to the main intersection in the village where five roads conjoin.
- Machias Junction – A hamlet southeast of Machias on County Road 37
- Sucker Pond – A small body of water near Brewers Corners

== Notable people ==
- Mary E. Green (1841–1910), physician
