= Blossom, New York =

Hamlet in New York, United States

Coordinates: 42°51′22″N 78°41′35″W

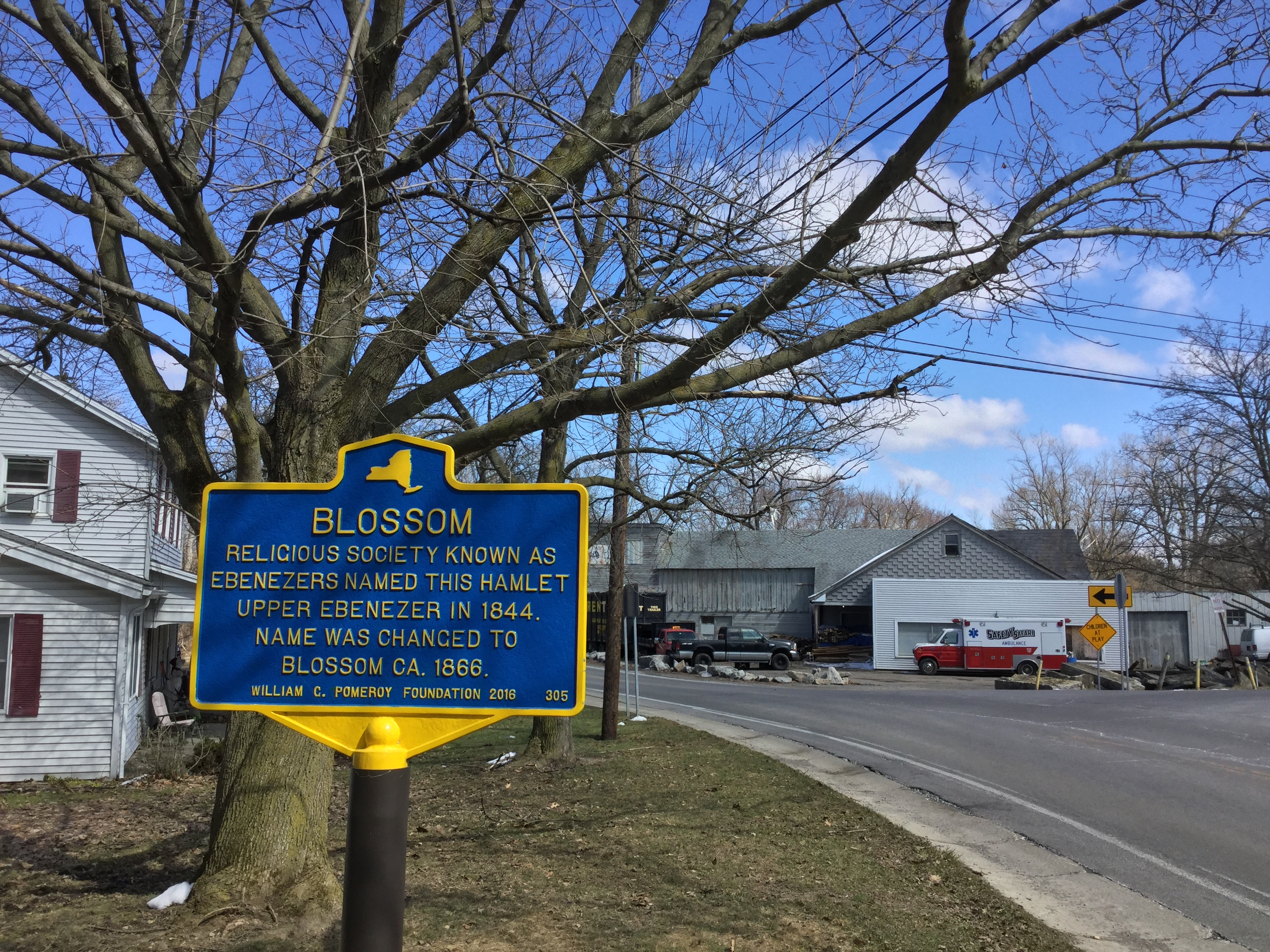
Historical marker in Blossom, New York

Blossom is a hamlet in the town of Elma in Erie County, New York, United States. It was originally founded by the Ebenezer Society as Upper Ebenezer in 1844. The origin of the present name is not known, but it may have come from the profusion of apple blossoms in the area.

== External links ==
- Buffalo in the '50s: Elma's Blossom GLF mill
