= Yulan, New York =

Community in Sullivan County, New York

Coordinates: 41°31′21″N 74°55′59″W

Yulan is a community and census tract in Sullivan County, New York, United States. It is one of five hamlets that comprise the Town of Highland, including Eldred, Barryville, Minisink Ford and Highland Lake.

Yulan is in area code 845 (exchange 557) and has zip code 12792. The neighboring hamlets are Shohola, Pennsylvania, Eldred, and Narrowsburg, New York.

Yulan is the location of a Roman Catholic church, the Church of St. Anthony of Padua. As of 2014, Yulan has a population of 300 people, 66.5% of whom are married. Toasperns Pond, Montgomery Lake, Bodine Lake, and Washington Lake are all in Yulan.
