= Yorkshire (CDP), New York =

Yorkshire, New York
- Census-designated place
- Location within New York Location within the United States
- Coordinates: 42°31′21″N 78°28′31″W
- Country: United States
- State: New York
- County: Cattaraugus
- Town: Yorkshire

Area
  - Total: 1.85 sq mi (4.80 km^{2})
  - Land: 1.85 sq mi (4.78 km^{2})
  - Water: 0.012 sq mi (0.03 km^{2})
- Elevation: 1,434 ft (437 m)

Population (2020)
  - Total: 1,176
  - Density: 637.4/sq mi (246.12/km^{2})
- Time zone: UTC-5 (Eastern (EST))
  - Summer (DST): UTC-4 (EDT)
- ZIP Codes: 14173 (Yorkshire); 14042 (Delevan); 14030 (Chaffee); 14009 (Arcade)
- Area code: 716
- FIPS code: 36-84044
- GNIS feature ID: 0971837

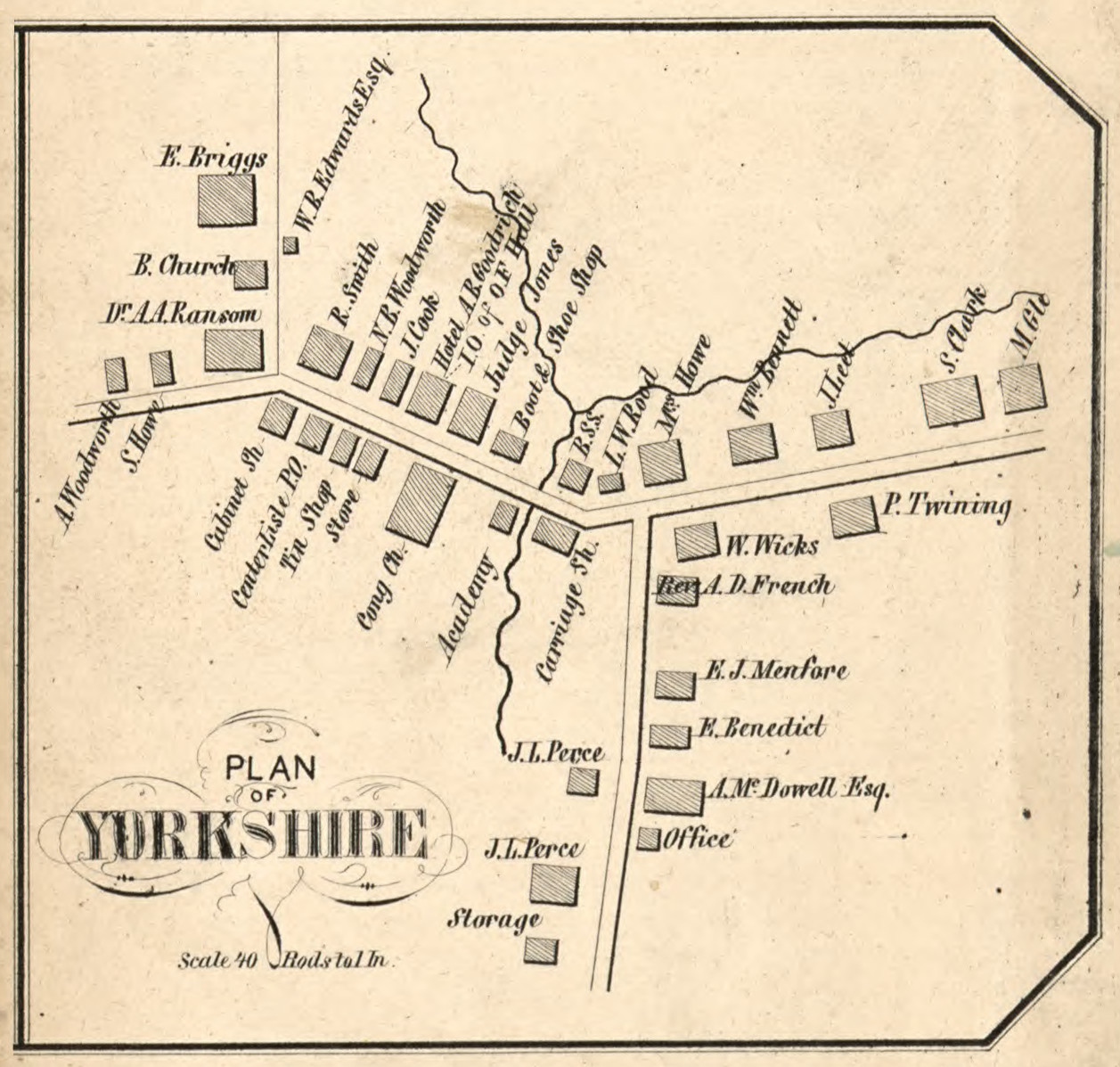
Plan of Yorkshire (1855)

Yorkshire is a census-designated place (CDP) in the northeastern corner of the town of Yorkshire in Cattaraugus County, New York, United States. The population of the CDP was 1,180 at the 2010 census, out of 3,913 in the town of Yorkshire as a whole.

== Geography ==
Yorkshire CDP is located at 42°31′20″N 78°28′31″W (42.522493, -78.475295).

According to the United States Census Bureau, the CDP has a total area of 1.9 square miles (4.8 km^{2}), of which 0.01 square miles (0.03 km^{2}), or 0.56%, is water.

Yorkshire is on the south bank of Cattaraugus Creek and at the intersection of State Routes 16 and 39. The village of Arcade in Wyoming County is 2 miles (3 km) to the east on NY 39. County Roads 54 and 72 also lead into Yorkshire.

== Demographics ==
Historical population
Census	Pop.	Note	%±
2020	1,176		—
U.S. Decennial Census

As of the census of 2000, there were 1,403 people, 611 households, and 378 families residing in the CDP. The population density was 759.6 inhabitants per square mile (293.3/km^{2}). There were 690 housing units at an average density of 373.6 per square mile (144.2/km^{2}). The racial makeup of the CDP was 99.07% White, 0.14% Black or African American, 0.14% Native American, 0.36% Asian, and 0.29% from two or more races. Hispanic or Latino of any race were 0.64% of the population.

There were 611 households, out of which 28.5% had children under the age of 18 living with them, 47.3% were married couples living together, 9.2% had a female householder with no husband present, and 38.1% were non-families. 30.3% of all households were made up of individuals, and 14.1% had someone living alone who was 65 years of age or older. The average household size was 2.30 and the average family size was 2.85.

In the CDP, the population was spread out, with 23.5% under the age of 18, 9.3% from 18 to 24, 28.1% from 25 to 44, 22.4% from 45 to 64, and 16.7% who were 65 years of age or older. The median age was 37 years. For every 100 females, there were 94.6 males. For every 100 females age 18 and over, there were 88.2 males.

The median income for a household in the CDP was $28,240, and the median income for a family was $31,694. Males had a median income of $25,694 versus $25,050 for females. The per capita income for the CDP was $15,396. About 9.1% of families and 16.3% of the population were below the poverty line, including 21.8% of those under age 18 and 16.5% of those age 65 or over.
