= Elma Center, New York =

- Census-designated place
- Location in Erie County and the state of New York
- Coordinates: 42°49′57″N 78°38′0″W
- Country: United States
- State: New York
- County: Erie
- Town: Elma

Area
  - Total: 6.28 sq mi (16.26 km^{2})
  - Land: 6.28 sq mi (16.26 km^{2})
  - Water: 0 sq mi (0.00 km^{2})
- Elevation: 804 ft (245 m)

Population (2020)
  - Total: 2,851
  - Density: 454.1/sq mi (175.33/km^{2})
- Time zone: UTC-5 (Eastern (EST))
  - Summer (DST): UTC-4 (EDT)
- ZIP Code: 14059 (Elma)
- FIPS code: 36-24141
- GNIS feature ID: 0949564

Elma Center is a hamlet and census-designated place (CDP) in the town of Elma in Erie County, New York, United States. As of the 2020 census, Elma Center had a population of 2,851. It is part of the Buffalo–Niagara Falls Metropolitan Statistical Area.

Elma Center is located near the center of the town on Bowen Road.

== Geography ==
Elma Center is located at 42°49′57″N 78°38′0″W (42.832559, -78.633242).

According to the United States Census Bureau, the community has a total area of 6.2 square miles (16 km^{2}), all land.

== Demographics ==
Historical population
Census	Pop.	Note	%±
2020	2,851		—
U.S. Decennial Census

=== 2020 census ===
As of the 2020 census, Elma Center had a population of 2,851. The median age was 52.3 years. 17.3% of residents were under the age of 18 and 29.6% of residents were 65 years of age or older. For every 100 females there were 86.3 males, and for every 100 females age 18 and over there were 84.5 males age 18 and over.

66.5% of residents lived in urban areas, while 33.5% lived in rural areas.

There were 1,228 households in Elma Center, of which 19.4% had children under the age of 18 living in them. Of all households, 60.3% were married-couple households, 11.6% were households with a male householder and no spouse or partner present, and 24.5% were households with a female householder and no spouse or partner present. About 26.2% of all households were made up of individuals and 18.3% had someone living alone who was 65 years of age or older.

There were 1,261 housing units, of which 2.6% were vacant. The homeowner vacancy rate was 0.5% and the rental vacancy rate was 7.4%.

Racial composition as of the 2020 census
Race	Number	Percent
White	2,752	96.5%
Black or African American	5	0.2%
American Indian and Alaska Native	1	0.0%
Asian	11	0.4%
Native Hawaiian and Other Pacific Islander	0	0.0%
Some other race	15	0.5%
Two or more races	67	2.4%
Hispanic or Latino (of any race)	28	1.0%

=== 2000 census ===
At the 2000 census there were 2,491 people, 967 households, and 731 families living in the community. The population density was 399.0 inhabitants per square mile (154.1/km^{2}). There were 993 housing units at an average density of 159.1 per square mile (61.4/km^{2}). The racial makeup of the CDP was 99.00% White, 0.04% African American, 0.36% Asian, 0.12% from other races, and 0.48% from two or more races. Hispanic or Latino of any race were 0.52%.

Of the 967 households 27.4% had children under the age of 18 living with them, 69.2% were married couples living together, 4.4% had a female householder with no husband present, and 24.4% were non-families. 21.7% of households were one person and 11.8% were one person aged 65 or older. The average household size was 2.58 and the average family size was 3.01.

The age distribution was 22.0% under the age of 18, 5.3% from 18 to 24, 24.6% from 25 to 44, 29.1% from 45 to 64, and 19.1% 65 or older. The median age was 44 years. For every 100 females, there were 95.2 males. For every 100 females age 18 and over, there were 93.5 males.

The median household income was $54,010 and the median family income was $61,500. Males had a median income of $42,071 versus $30,037 for females. The per capita income for the CDP was $25,877. About 2.1% of families and 3.4% of the population were below the poverty line, including 7.1% of those under age 18 and 3.3% of those age 65 or over.
