= Yorkshire, New York =

- Town
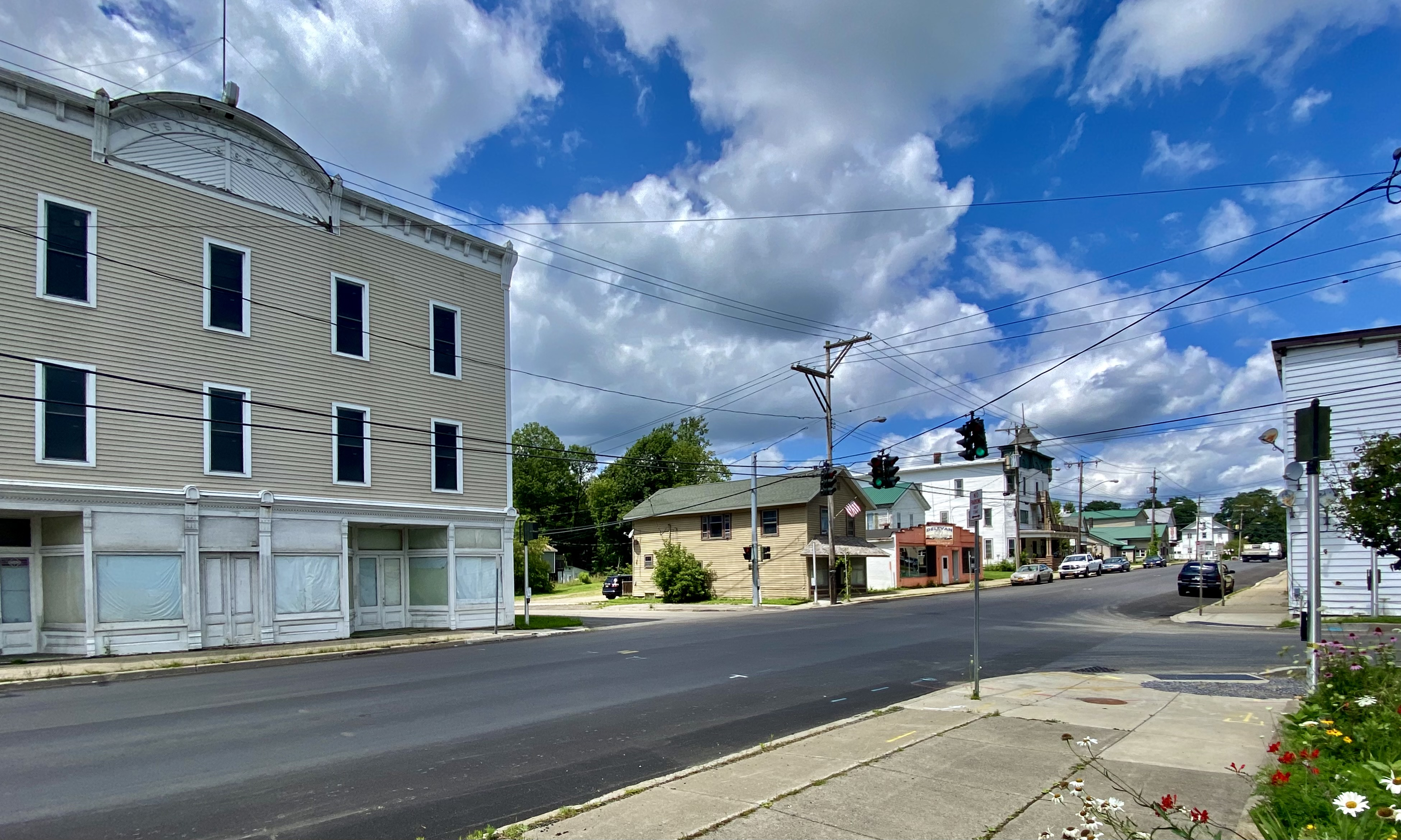
- Main Street in the village of Delevan, July 2021

- Location within New York Location within the United States
- Coordinates: 42°29′9″N 78°30′32″W
- Country: United States
- State: New York
- County: Cattaraugus

Government
  - Type: Town Council
  - Town Supervisor: Marcia J. Spencer (D)
  - Town Council: Members' List: • Kenneth O. Fisher (R); • Michael E. Miles (R); • Constance E. Walker (D); • fourth board member currently vacant

Area
  - Total: 37.04 sq mi (95.94 km^{2})
  - Land: 36.90 sq mi (95.56 km^{2})
  - Water: 0.15 sq mi (0.38 km^{2})
- Elevation: 1,697 ft (517 m)

Population (2020)
  - Total: 3,840
  - Estimate (2021): 3,808
  - Density: 102.1/sq mi (39.43/km^{2})
- Time zone: Eastern (EST)
- ZIP Codes: 14173 (Yorkshire); 14042 (Delevan); 14009 (Arcade); 14030 (Chaffee); 14141 (Springville)
- FIPS code: 36-009-84055
- Website: www.yorkshireny.gov

Yorkshire is a town in Cattaraugus County, New York, United States. The population was 3,840 at the 2020 census. The town is located on the northern edge and in the northeast quadrant of the county.

== History ==
The area that would become the town was first settled circa 1810. The town of Yorkshire was formed in 1820 from the "town of Ischua" (now Franklinville). In 1827, the south part of the town was taken to form the town of Machias.

Western historian and notable U.S. Army engineer Hiram M. Chittenden was born in Yorkshire on October 25, 1858.

== Geography ==
According to the United States Census Bureau, the town has a total area of 36.4 square miles (94.3 km^{2}), of which 36.3 square miles (93.9 km^{2}) is land and 0.15 square miles (0.4 km^{2}), or 0.40%, is water.

The northern border of the town is formed by Cattaraugus Creek and Erie County. Part of the eastern border is formed by Wyoming County.

New York State Route 16 (north-south) and New York State Route 39 (east-west) intersect and briefly conjoin in the town.

=== Adjacent towns ===
(Clockwise)

- Sardinia
- Arcade; Freedom
- Machias
- Ashford

== Demographics ==
Historical population
Census	Pop.	Note	%±
1830	823		—
1840	1,292		57.0%
1850	2,010		55.6%
1860	1,844		−8.3%
1870	1,575		−14.6%
1880	1,784		13.3%
1890	1,723		−3.4%
1900	1,738		0.9%
1910	1,563		−10.1%
1920	1,524		−2.5%
1930	1,512		−0.8%
1940	1,410		−6.7%
1950	1,633		15.8%
1960	2,012		23.2%
1970	2,627		30.6%
1980	3,620		37.8%
1990	3,905		7.9%
2000	4,210		7.8%
2010	3,913		−7.1%
2020	3,840		−1.9%
2021 (est.)	3,808	▼	−0.8%
U.S. Decennial Census

As of the census of 2000, there were 4,210 people, 1,670 households, and 1,122 families residing in the town. The population density was 113.9 inhabitants per square mile (44.0/km^{2}). There were 1,938 housing units at an average density of 52.4 per square mile (20.2/km^{2}). The racial makeup of the town was 98.81% White, 0.10% Black or African American, 0.33% Native American, 0.29% Asian, 0.14% from other races, and 0.33% from two or more races. Hispanic or Latino of any race were 0.59% of the population.

There were 1,670 households, out of which 33.5% had children under the age of 18 living with them, 53.5% were married couples living together, 9.7% had a female householder with no husband present, and 32.8% were non-families. 26.2% of all households were made up of individuals, and 10.2% had someone living alone who was 65 years of age or older. The average household size was 2.52 and the average family size was 3.06.

In the town, the population was spread out, with 27.2% under the age of 18, 8.5% from 18 to 24, 29.0% from 25 to 44, 23.0% from 45 to 64, and 12.4% who were 65 years of age or older. The median age was 36 years. For every 100 females, there were 101.8 males. For every 100 females age 18 and over, there were 95.6 males.

The median income for a household in the town was $31,060, and the median income for a family was $39,229. Males had a median income of $30,103 versus $22,205 for females. The per capita income for the town was $15,842. About 9.1% of families and 13.7% of the population were below the poverty line, including 20.5% of those under age 18 and 11.9% of those age 65 or over.

== Notable people ==
- Hiram M. Chittenden, leading historian of the American West
- Rodney R. Crowley, former New York Inspector of State Prisons
- Irving Stringham, mathematician

== Communities and locations in Yorkshire ==
- Delevan – The village of Delevan is located in the northeast part of the town, south of Yorkshire village on NY Route 16 and County Roads 20, 21, and 73.
- The Forks – A location near the north town line west of Yorkshire village.
- Lime Lake Outlet – A north-flowing stream that passes west of Delevan and empties into Cattaraugus Creek near Yorkshire village.
- McKinstrys Hollow – A location by the junction of County Roads 20 and 55 in the south-central part of the town.
- Silliman's Corners – A location near the north town line west of Yorkshire village, located on former County Road 72.
- Yorkshire – The hamlet of Yorkshire is located on NY Route 16 and former County Roads 54 and 72 in the northeast corner of the town by Cattaraugus Creek.
