= Elma, New York =

- Town
- Flag Seal
- Nickname: The Heart of Erie County
- Location in Erie County and New York.

- Location of New York in the United States
- Coordinates: 42°49′17″N 78°38′13″W
- Country: United States
- State: New York
- County: Erie
- Settlement: 1827
- Incorporated: 1857
- Named for: American elm

Government
  - Supervisor: Wayne Clark (R) Town Council: Michael Nolan (R); James Malczewski (R); Tracy W. Petrocy (R); Thomas M. Fallon (R)

Area
  - Total: 34.53 sq mi (89.44 km^{2})
  - Land: 34.52 sq mi (89.41 km^{2})
  - Water: 0.012 sq mi (0.03 km^{2})
- Elevation: 869 ft (265 m)

Population (2020)
  - Total: 11,721 ▲
  - Density: 340/sq mi (132/km^{2})
- Time zone: UTC-5 (EST)
  - Summer (DST): UTC-4 (EDT)
- ZIP Codes: 14059 (Elma); 14052 (East Aurora); 14043 (Depew); 14086 (Lancaster); 14127 (Orchard Park)
- Area code: 716
- FIPS code: 36-029-24130
- FIPS code: 36-24130
- GNIS feature ID: 0978937
- Website: www.elmanewyork.com

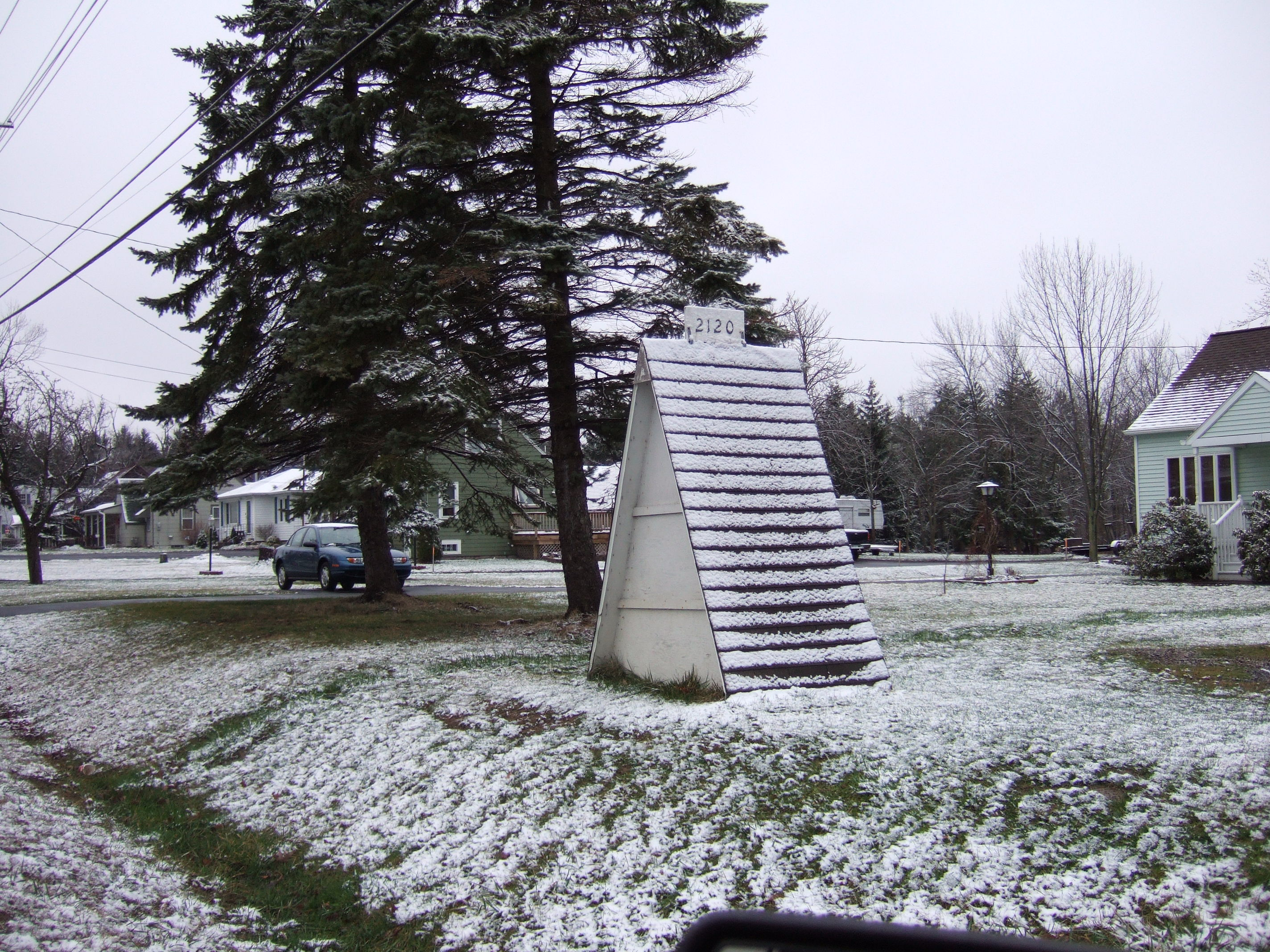
Elma, New York (2007)

Elma is a town in Erie County, New York, United States. The population was 11,721 at the 2020 census. The town is named after the American elm tree.

Elma is in the county's central area, southeast of Buffalo. It is part of the Buffalo-Niagara Falls metropolitan area.

== History ==
The area was settled around 1827. The early residents included members of the Ebenezer Society.

Elma was the last town formed in the county. When the time came to put up a post office for the local lumber mill, a resident suggested it be named after a famous large American elm, then growing at the corner of the modern Clinton and Bowen Road. The name was accepted, and after all procedures were carried out, the new Elma Post Office was established in 1852 and began receiving mail three times a week. The town was officially created in 1857 from parts of the towns of Aurora and Lancaster.

== Notable people ==
Fran Striker, the creator of the Lone Ranger and the Green Hornet, was killed in a car accident here on September 4, 1962, while moving with his family.

After moving back to western New York in 2007, long-time Buffalo Bills running back Thurman Thomas opened Thurman Thomas Sports Training in Elma.

Other notable people include:

- James Bradley, musician, drummer
- Jackson C. Frank, folk musician
- Patrick Gallivan, New York state senator
- Jake Kaminski, Olympic archer
- Les Kuntar, retired NHL goaltender
- Frank Lazarus, former president of the University of Dallas
- Otto Orf, retired soccer goalkeeper
- James A. Pawelczyk, astronaut

== Geography ==
According to the United States Census Bureau, the town has a total area of 34.53 square miles (89.43 km^{2}), of which 34.52 square miles (89.40 km^{2}) is land and 0.01 square miles (0.03 km^{2}), or 0.03%, is water.

New York State Route 78 makes the west town line. The East Aurora Expressway (New York State Route 400) crosses the town.

=== Adjacent cities and towns ===
- West Seneca - west
- Orchard Park - west
- Aurora - south
- Wales - southeast
- Marilla - east
- Lancaster - north
- Cheektowaga - northwest

=== Major highways ===
- U.S. Route 20 (Transit Road), east–west highway (north–south in town) that marks the western border of town with Orchard Park and West Seneca. (Runs concurrently with NY 78 north of Seneca Street.)
- New York State Route 16 (Seneca Street), north–south roadway (northwest–southeast in town) that runs concurrent with NY 78 from West Seneca town line to Aurora town line.
- New York State Route 78 (Transit Road, Seneca Street), north–south roadway that marks west town line with West Seneca (when also concurrent with US 20) and runs concurrent with NY 16 southeast into town of Aurora.
- New York State Route 187 (Transit Road), north–south roadway that forms west boundary of town with Orchard Park. (Continuation of Transit after US 20 splits off to west.)
- New York State Route 354 (Clinton Street), east–west route through town from West Seneca to Marilla.
- New York State Route 400 (Aurora Expressway), north–south highway (runs generally east–west through town) from West Seneca town line at NY 16/NY 78 to Aurora town line just east of village of East Aurora.

== Demographics ==
Historical population
| Census | Pop. | Note | %± |
|---|---|---|---|
| 1860 | 2,091 | | — |
| 1870 | 2,827 | | 35.2% |
| 1880 | 2,555 | | −9.6% |
| 1890 | 2,163 | | −15.3% |
| 1900 | 2,202 | | 1.8% |
| 1910 | 2,130 | | −3.3% |
| 1920 | 1,966 | | −7.7% |
| 1930 | 2,320 | | 18.0% |
| 1940 | 2,801 | | 20.7% |
| 1950 | 4,020 | | 43.5% |
| 1960 | 7,468 | | 85.8% |
| 1970 | 10,011 | | 34.1% |
| 1980 | 10,574 | | 5.6% |
| 1990 | 10,355 | | −2.1% |
| 2000 | 11,304 | | 9.2% |
| 2010 | 11,317 | | 0.1% |
| 2020 | 11,721 | | 3.6% |
U.S. Decennial Census

As of the census of 2000, there were 11,304 people, 4,186 households, and 3,294 families residing in the town. The population density was 327.7 inhabitants per square mile (126.5/km^{2}). There were 4,296 housing units at an average density of 124.5 per square mile (48.1/km^{2}). The racial makeup of the town was 99.09% White, 0.05% African American, 0.05% Native American, 0.27% Asian, 0.01% Pacific Islander, 0.07% from other races, and 0.46% from two or more races. Hispanic or Latino of any race were 0.60% of the population.

There were 4,186 households, out of which 32.6% had children under the age of 18 living with them, 70.0% were married couples living together, 6.0% had a female householder with no husband present, and 21.3% were non-families. 17.9% of all households were made up of individuals, and 9.6% had someone living alone who was 65 years of age or older. The average household size was 2.69 and the average family size was 3.08.

In the town, the population was spread out, with 24.5% under the age of 18, 5.5% from 18 to 24, 26.1% from 25 to 44, 27.9% from 45 to 64, and 16.0% who were 65 years of age or older. The median age was 42 years. For every 100 females, there were 97.8 males. For every 100 females age 18 and over, there were 95.4 males.

The town's median household income was $56,334, and the median family income was $63,922. Males had a median income of $42,679 versus $28,826 for females. The town's per capita income was $25,960. About 2.3% of families and 3.4% of the population were below the poverty line, including 3.4% of those under age 18 and 6.3% of those age 65 or over.

== Communities and locations in Elma ==
- Blossom – A hamlet in the town's Northwest corner. It was the principal location of the Ebenezer Society.
- Cotton District – A hamlet located Northeast of Elma Center near the Clinton Road and Girdle Road area; named for multiple families named Cotton in the area.
- East Elma – A hamlet in the southeast part of Elma.
- Elma Center – A hamlet near the town's center and south of Elma Village on Bowen Road.
- Elma Village – A hamlet near the Northern town line on Bowen Road.
- Jamison Road – A hamlet located Southeast of Elma Center on Jamison Road.
- Spring Brook – A hamlet on Route 16 (Seneca Street) near the Western town line.
- Buffalo Creek – A stream flowing westward through the town's northern part. The name of the city of Buffalo is derived from the stream. There were no buffalo living in the area during the colonial period, although they are now raised on several local farms. As it approaches the city of Buffalo, the creek is called the Buffalo River.
- Cazenovia Creek – A stream flowing northward through the town's Southwest part.
- Billington Heights – A small, 1955-era housing development in the Southeast part of Elma; it is not a hamlet.

== Schools ==
Public schools in Elma are under the jurisdiction of the Iroquois Central School District. Iroquois Central Schools consistently enjoys top rank as the 5th or 6th best public school in Western New York. Made up of approximately 3,000 students district-wide, Iroquois divides its students in an unconventional manner, with three primary schools for students in kindergarten through 3rd grade, an intermediate school for students in 4th and 5th grade, a middle school for students from 6th to 8th grade, and a high school for students in 9th to 12th grade.

While the primary schools are in the respective towns indicated by their names (Elma Primary, Marilla Primary, and Wales Primary), the other three schools are on the same expansive campus at 2111 Girdle Road in Elma. The campus is divided such that the high school and middle school are separated by the intermediate school, acting as a buffer between the similar age groups. The three buildings are connected by walkways, but students rarely leave the building to which their grade belongs. In accord, the primary, intermediate, middle, and high school buildings each have their own gymnasium, cafeteria, library, and administrative offices.

The undeveloped areas that surround each school provide open space for younger students to play and older students to take part in extracurricular activities.

Some of the latest additions to the school, in fact, involve the development of a large field across the street from the high school. These fields across from the high school have been developed recently into a parking lot for students as well as soccer and lacrosse fields for the teams. In addition, the middle school library was recently remodeled, an extra wing of classrooms was added to the high school, and plans call for the renovation of the high school music department.

== Industry ==
The headquarters for beverage manufacturer Elmhurst 1925 are in Elma. The Made In America Franchise is also headquartered in Elma. Moog Inc., an aerospace engineering company also resides here.

== Fire companies ==
The town of Elma has four volunteer fire companies: Blossom, Elma, Jamison Road, and Spring Brook. Blossom is one of the oldest fire companies in the county, establishing in 1872.
