= Farmersville Station, New York =

- Hamlet
- Location within New York Location within the United States
- Coordinates: 42°25′39″N 78°21′39″W
- Country: United States
- State: New York
- County: Cattaraugus
- Elevation: 1,722 ft (525 m)
- Time zone: UTC-5 (Eastern (EST))
  - Summer (DST): UTC-4 (EDT)
- ZIP code: 14060
- Area code: 716
- GNIS feature ID: 949917

Farmersville Station is a hamlet in Cattaraugus County, New York, United States. The community is located along New York State Route 98, 8 miles (13 km) northeast of Franklinville. Farmersville Station has a post office with ZIP code 14060, which opened on October 23, 1878.
