= New York State Route 16 =

State highway in western New York, in the USA

New York State Route 16
- Map of western New York with NY 16 highlighted in red and NY 951V in blue

Route information
- Maintained by NYSDOT, Erie County, and the cities of Buffalo and Olean
- Length: 79.19 mi (127.44 km)
- Existed: 1924–present

Major junctions
- South end: PA 646 at the Pennsylvania state line in Allegany
- I-86 / NY 17 / Southern Tier Expressway in Olean; NY 39 in Yorkshire; NY 400 in Aurora and West Seneca; US 20A in East Aurora; US 20 in West Seneca; US 62 in Buffalo
- North end: NY 5 in Buffalo

Location
- Country: United States
- State: New York
- Counties: Cattaraugus, Erie

Highway system
- New York Highways; Interstate; US; State; Reference; Parkways
← NY 15A	→ NY 17

New York State Route 16 (NY 16) is a state highway in western New York, in the United States. It runs from the Pennsylvania state line, where it is one of the highest highways in the state in elevation, to downtown Buffalo. NY 16 is a major route through Erie County, despite the construction of the paralleling NY 400 freeway from East Aurora. In Cattaraugus County it also plays an important role, serving as the major connection from Olean to the Southern Tier Expressway (Interstate 86 or I-86 and NY 17). Between those two areas, and indeed for much of its length, it is a two-lane rural road.

NY 16 initially ended in Olean when it was assigned in 1924. It was extended south to the Pennsylvania state line in the early 1930s; however, it initially overlapped NY 17 east to Portville, where it connected to Pennsylvania by way of modern NY 305. NY 16's current alignment south of Olean was originally designated as New York State Route 16A around this time. NY 16 was rerouted to follow the routing of NY 16A south of Olean in August 1962.

== Route description ==
=== Cattaraugus County ===
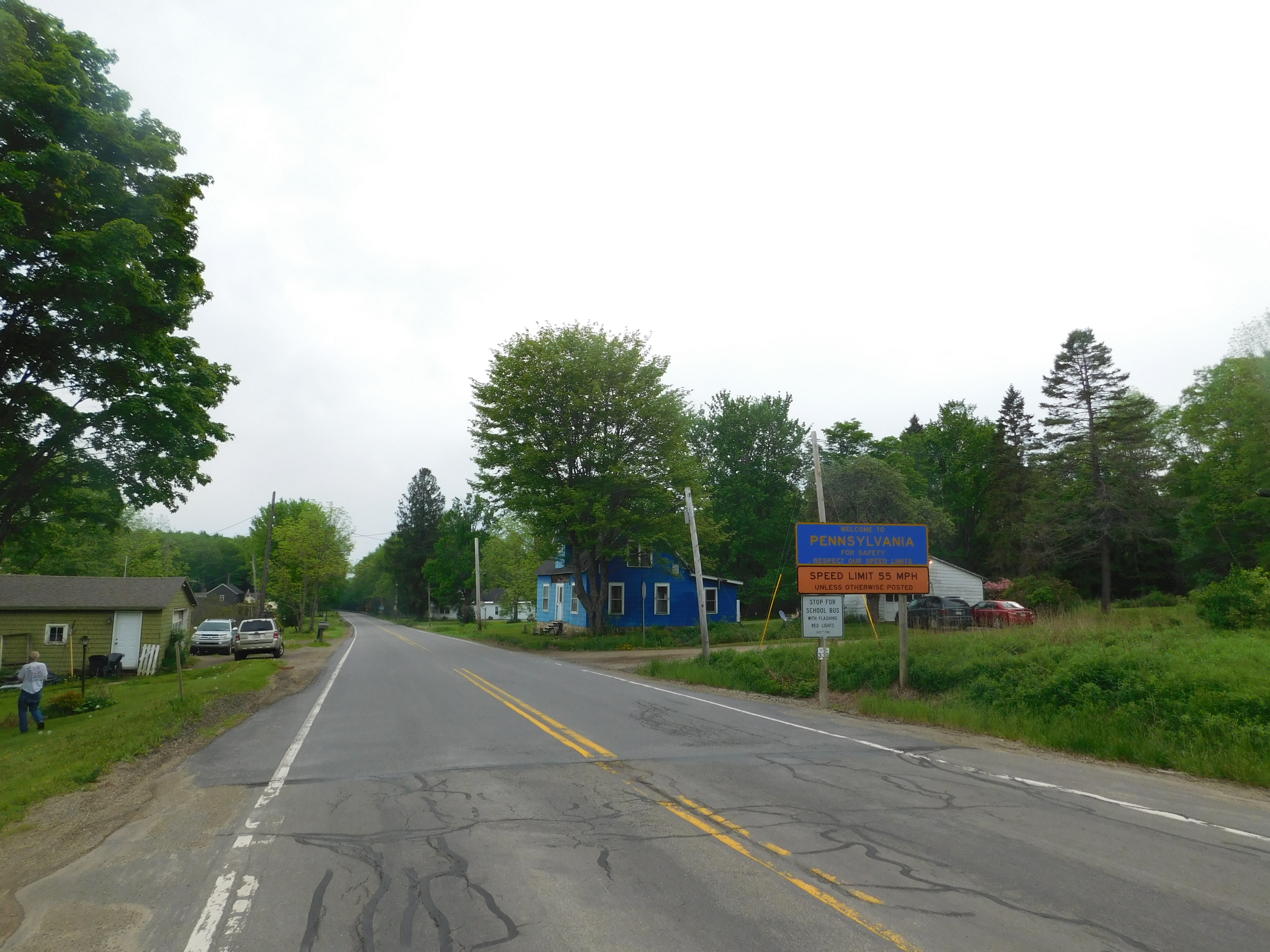
NY 16 southbound approaching the Pennsylvania state line

When PA 646 becomes NY 16 at the state line, it is already at a very high elevation on a ridgecrest, and at a rise two miles (3.2 km) into New York, it reaches 2,386 feet (727 m) in elevation, making it the highest state highway in western New York and among the highest in the state. It remains at a high elevation for several more miles, through what was once one of New York's major oil fields. Afterwards, NY 16 then begins to drop through a narrow valley to cross the Allegheny River and enter its first major community, the city of Olean (which, like several other communities in the region, takes its name from oil). It crosses the city as Union Street, intersecting its first state highway, NY 417, at State Street. Here, ownership and maintenance of NY 16 shifts to the city for six blocks before becoming state-maintained once more at the point where North Union Street heads northwest to serve North Olean.

A mile (1.6 km) north of NY 417, NY 16 reaches a bridge over Olean Creek, a tributary of the Allegheny. On the other side, it becomes a four-lane road with a divider as it approaches NY 17, currently concurrent with I-86 pending the entire expressway's upgrade to Interstate Highway standards. A trumpet interchange provides access to I-86 and NY 17 in both directions in the vicinity of Baldwin Heights. But NY 16 runs parallel to the freeway and remains a four-lane route, although no longer divided, following the Olean valley. At Hinsdale it finally does cross I-86/NY 17. Shortly afterwards, in the hamlet of Maplehurst, NY 446, the former route of NY 408, comes in from the east and terminates.

NY 16 now follows the narrow valley of Ischua Creek, one of the Olean's tributaries, north past the road to the city's airport, in the town of Ischua, north to Franklinville. NY 98 joins NY 16 just south of the village and leaves north of it. NY 16 continues to Machias and the eastern end of NY 242. The highway veers to the northeast in Machias, turning back to the north at the resort hamlet of Lime Lake. A straight course takes the highway from this junction through the village of Delevan and to the Cattaraugus Creek bridge. This bridge heads into Erie County.

=== Erie County ===
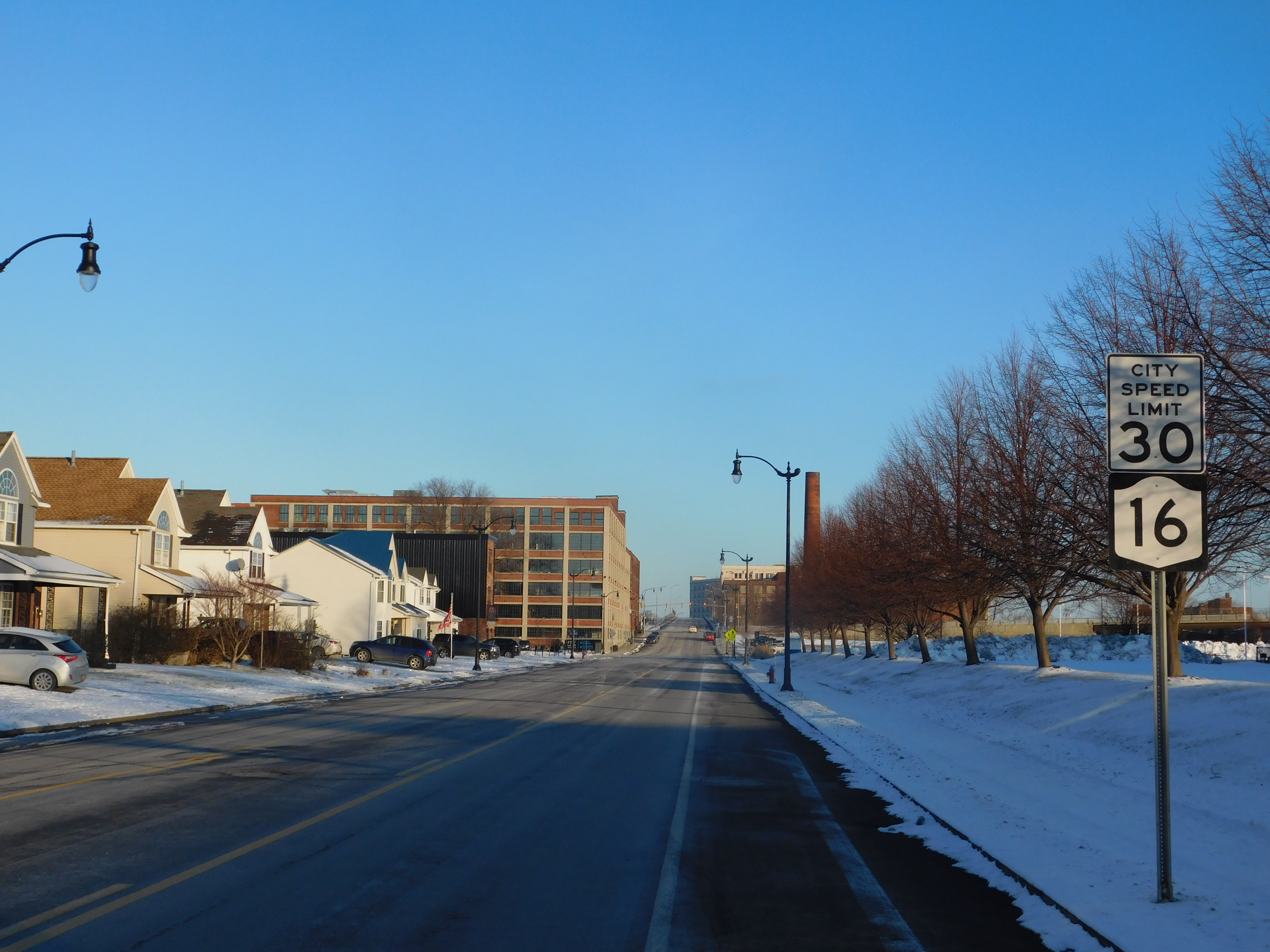
NY 16 on the Near East Side of Buffalo, looking southbound toward the Larkinville district

In the southeastern corner of the county, NY 16 intersects with NY 39. NY 16 then begins heading slightly northwestward through a wider, more developed valley in the towns of Holland and Wales to the first sign of an approaching major metropolitan area, the south end of NY 400, the Aurora Expressway. After joining the expressway for two miles (3 km), it again leaves to become a two-lane that enters East Aurora as Olean Street. At the intersection with Main Street, NY 16 turns left and briefly joins with U.S. Route 20A (US 20A) and NY 78. US 20A leaves the two state routes behind at a fork at the village's east end, leaving NY 16 and NY 78 to head to the northwest again as Buffalo Street. At this point, NY 16 and NY 78 become county-maintained for the next 6.5 miles (10.5 km) as the unsigned County Route 572 (CR 572). At Willardshire Road as the highway passes the industrial parks and other facilities associated with local company Moog Inc. North of the village, it enters the Town of Elma and becomes Seneca Street, the name it will retain all the way to the city.

NY 78 takes on its best-known name as well when it leaves at Transit Road (US 20), as NY 16 assumes an east–west heading across the suburban neighborhoods of West Seneca. It crosses NY 277, a major retail strip, at Union Road in the hamlet of Ebenezer. One final trumpet exit to NY 400 (and by extension, the New York State Thruway) precedes its junction with Harlem Road (NY 240), where county maintenance of NY 16, and thus the overlap with CR 572, ends. Just west of NY 240, NY 16 crosses the Thruway itself as it begins to head to the northwest and enter the city of Buffalo, where the route is locally maintained. Running almost due northwest through the residential neighborhoods of South Buffalo, NY 16 reaches its last major junction, with US 62, at Bailey Avenue just after crossing the Buffalo River. Immediately afterwards it crosses I-190 with no exit (but with northbound access) and returns to a more east–west course through industrial areas before ending at Main Street, NY 5, in the city center.

== History ==
New York State Route 16A
- Location: Pennsylvania state line–Olean
- Existed: c. 1932–August 1962

The portion of modern NY 16 between Hinsdale and Buffalo was originally designated as Route 17, an unsigned legislative route, by the New York State Legislature in 1908. At the same time, the segment of what is now NY 16 from Olean to Hinsdale was included in Route 4, a lengthy east–west route that extended from Lake Erie in Chautauqua County to the Hudson River in Orange County. The portion from Olean south to the state line was part of the old "Kittanning Road," a road constructed by the Continental Army during the 1779 Sullivan Expedition that connected Kittanning, Pennsylvania to the Allegheny River; the road is among the oldest roads in the region.

When the first set of posted routes in New York were assigned in 1924, much of Route 4—including the Olean–Hinsdale segment—was designated as NY 17 while legislative Route 17 became part of NY 16, which began in Olean and overlapped with NY 17 along former legislative Route 4 between Olean and Hinsdale.

In the 1930 renumbering of state highways in New York, NY 17 was realigned between Olean and Wellsville to follow modern NY 417, eliminating its overlap with NY 16. By the following year, NY 16 was extended south to the Pennsylvania state line near Portville via NY 17 and what is now NY 305. The modern routing of NY 16 between Pennsylvania and Olean was designated as NY 16A c. 1932. The alignments of both NY 16 and NY 16A remained the same until August 1962 when NY 16A was supplanted by a rerouted NY 16. The former routing of NY 16 between the Pennsylvania state line and NY 17 became an extension of NY 305.

The portion of the Aurora Expressway (NY 400) between East Aurora and South Wales was completed in the early 1970s. NY 16 was rerouted to follow the new highway for two miles (3 km) before exiting the freeway and returning to its previous alignment. The former routing of NY 16 in the area, a 2.24-mile (3.60 km) long portion of Olean Road, is now NY 951V, an unsigned reference route.

== Major intersections ==
County	Location	mi	km	Destinations	Notes
Cattaraugus	Town of Allegany	0.00	0.00	PA 646 south	Continuation into Pennsylvania
Cattaraugus	City of Olean	8.69	13.99	NY 417 (State Street)	
Cattaraugus	City of Olean	10.13	16.30	I-86 / NY 17 / Southern Tier Expressway – Salamanca, Binghamton	Exit 27 on I-86
Cattaraugus	Hinsdale	16.20	26.07	I-86 / NY 17 / Southern Tier Expressway – Olean, Binghamton	Exit 28 on I-86
Cattaraugus	Hinsdale	16.46	26.49	NY 446 east – Cuba	Western terminus of NY 446
Cattaraugus	Town of Franklinville	28.30	45.54	NY 98 south – Salamanca	Southern terminus of NY 98 overlap
Cattaraugus	Farmersville	31.46	50.63	NY 98 north – Rushford	Northern terminus of NY 98 overlap
Cattaraugus	Machias	35.07	56.44	NY 242 west (Ashford Road)	Eastern terminus of NY 242
Cattaraugus	Yorkshire	44.06	70.91	NY 39 east – Arcade	Southern terminus of NY 39 overlap; hamlet of Yorkshire
Erie	Sardinia	44.86	72.20	NY 39 west – Springville	Northern terminus of NY 39 overlap
Erie	Town of Aurora	58.43	94.03	Olean Road (NY 951V north) NY 400 begins	Southern terminus of NY 400 overlap; southern terminus of NY 400
Erie	Town of Aurora	58.43	94.03	Southern end of freeway section	
Erie	Town of Aurora	60.42	97.24	NY 400 north / Olean Road (NY 951V south) – Buffalo	Northbound exit and southbound entrance; northern terminus of NY 400 overlap
Erie	Town of Aurora	60.42	97.24	Northern end of freeway section	
Erie	East Aurora	62.36	100.36	US 20A east / NY 78 south (East Main Street)	Southern terminus of US 20A / NY 78 overlap
Erie	East Aurora	63.42	102.06	US 20A west (Hamburg Street)	Northern terminus of US 20A overlap
Erie	Elma	66.47	106.97	CR 574 (Jamison Road)	Former western terminus of NY 422
Erie	Elma–West Seneca line	68.96	110.98	US 20 / NY 78 north (Transit Road)	Northern terminus of NY 78 overlap
Erie	West Seneca	72.35	116.44	NY 277 (Union Road)	
Erie	West Seneca	73.71	118.62	NY 400 to I-90 / New York Thruway	Interchange
Erie	West Seneca	74.06	119.19	NY 240 (Harlem Road / Orchard Park Road)	
Erie	Buffalo	76.44	123.02	US 62 (Bailey Avenue)	
Erie	Buffalo	76.69	123.42	I-190 north – Downtown	Exit 3 on I-190
Erie	Buffalo	79.19	127.44	NY 5 (Ellicott Street)	Northern terminus
1.000 mi = 1.609 km; 1.000 km = 0.621 mi: Concurrency terminus

== See also ==
- List of county routes in Erie County, New York (545–580)
