= Delevan, New York =

- Village
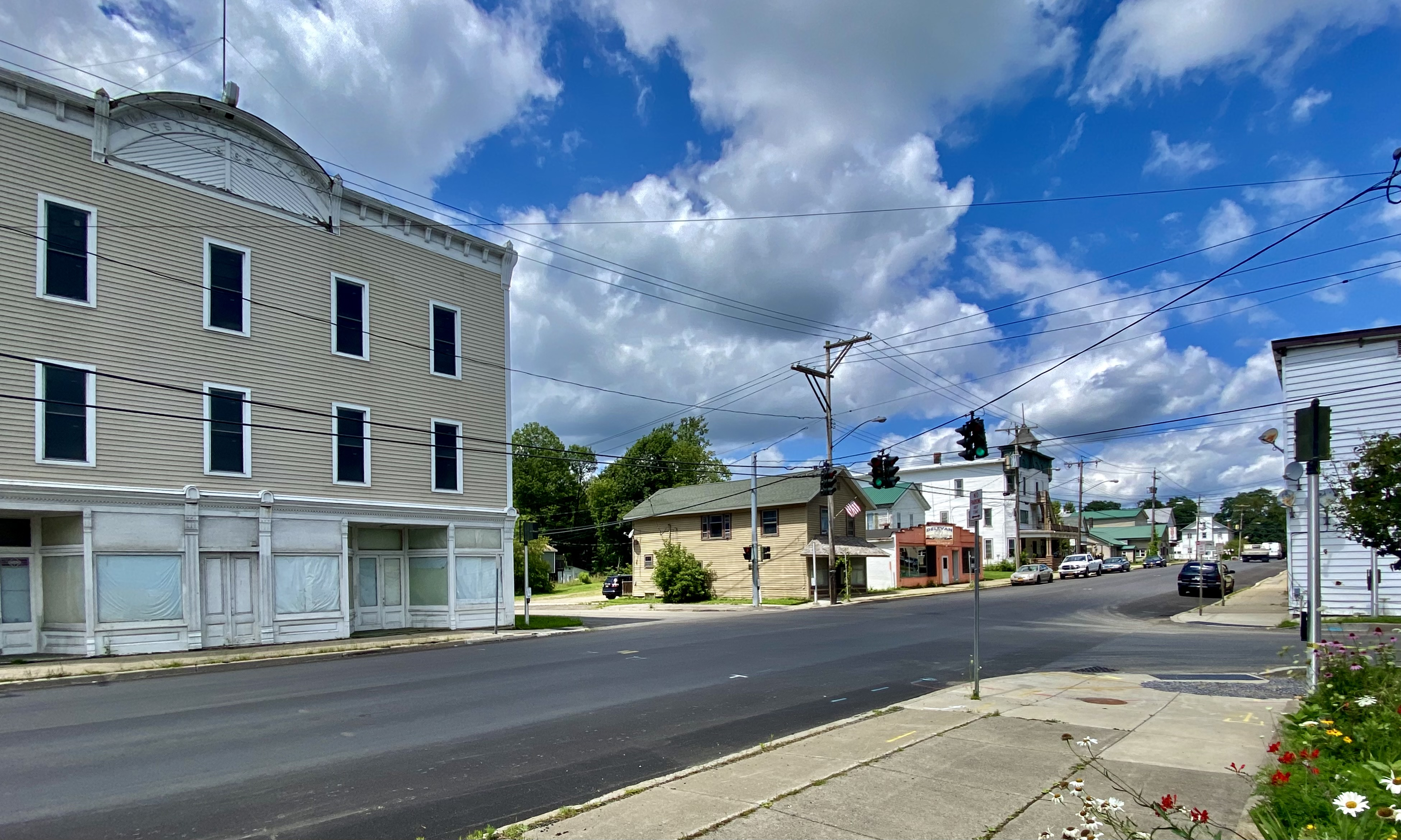
- Main Street, July 2021

- Location within the state of New York
- Coordinates: 42°29′N 78°29′W
- Country: United States
- State: New York
- County: Cattaraugus
- Town: Yorkshire

Area
  - Total: 0.99 sq mi (2.57 km^{2})
  - Land: 0.99 sq mi (2.57 km^{2})
  - Water: 0 sq mi (0.00 km^{2})
- Elevation: 1,424 ft (434 m)

Population (2020)
  - Total: 1,043
  - Density: 1,049.3/sq mi (405.14/km^{2})
- Time zone: UTC-5 (Eastern (EST))
  - Summer (DST): UTC-4 (EDT)
- ZIP code: 14042
- Area code: 716
- FIPS code: 36-20115
- GNIS feature ID: 0948273
- Website: www.yorkshireny.gov

Delevan is a village in Cattaraugus County, New York, United States. The population was 1,064 at the 2020 census. The village is within the town of Yorkshire.

== History ==
The first lot was cleared circa 1821. The name of the area was changed from Yorkshire Center to Delevan in 1892. The village was incorporated in 1915.

== Geography ==
Delevan is located in northeastern Cattaraugus County in the east-central part of the town of Yorkshire at 42°29′N 78°29′W (42.4896, −78.4798).

According to the United States Census Bureau, the village has a total area of 0.99 square miles (2.57 km^{2}), all land.

New York State Route 16 passes through the village. Cattaraugus County Routes 20, 21 and 73 terminate at the village limits.

Yorkshire is north of the community of Lime Lake and south of the community of Yorkshire. Elton Creek joins Lime Lake Outlet west of the village.

== Demographics ==
Historical population
Census	Pop.	Note	%±
1920	547		—
1930	558		2.0%
1940	554		−0.7%
1950	611		10.3%
1960	777		27.2%
1970	994		27.9%
1980	1,113		12.0%
1990	1,214		9.1%
2000	1,089		−10.3%
2010	1,089		0.0%
2020	1,043		−4.2%
2021 (est.)	1,054	▲	1.1%
U.S. Decennial Census

As of the census of 2000, there were 1,089 people, 436 households, and 279 families residing in the village. The population density was 1,113.0 inhabitants per square mile (429.7/km^{2}). There were 470 housing units at an average density of 480.4 per square mile (185.5/km^{2}). The racial makeup of the village was 98.26% White, 0.18% African American, 0.09% Native American, 0.55% Asian, 0.18% from other races, and 0.73% from two or more races. Hispanic or Latino of any race were 0.64% of the population.

There were 436 households, out of which 32.6% had children under the age of 18 living with them, 50.5% were married couples living together, 10.1% had a female householder with no husband present, and 35.8% were non-families. 29.6% of all households were made up of individuals, and 11.0% had someone living alone who was 65 years of age or older. The average household size was 2.50 and the average family size was 3.13.

In the village, the population was spread out, with 28.1% under the age of 18, 10.4% from 18 to 24, 25.6% from 25 to 44, 23.9% from 45 to 64, and 12.0% who were 65 years of age or older. The median age was 34 years. For every 100 females, there were 104.3 males. For every 100 females age 18 and over, there were 93.8 males.

The median income for a household in the village was $33,654, and the median income for a family was $42,039. Males had a median income of $32,037 versus $22,500 for females. The per capita income for the village was $15,667. About 11.2% of families and 14.8% of the population were below the poverty line, including 26.3% of those under age 18 and 6.5% of those age 65 or over.

== Notable people ==
- Rusty Dedrick, trumpeter, composer
- The Free Design, pop music group (1967–1972)
- Richard Edmunds, American rower
- Frank Isbell, Major League Baseball player for 1906 World Series champion Chicago White Sox
- Howie Krist, pitcher in Major League Baseball
- Charles Newton, firearms inventor
