= New York State Energy Research and Development Authority =

New York State government agency

Authority overview
- Jurisdiction: Promotion of energy efficiency and the use of renewable energy sources
- Headquarters: 17 Columbia Circle Albany, NY 12203-6399
- Authority executive: Doreen Harris, President and Chief Executive Officer
- Website: www.nyserda.ny.gov

The New York State Energy Research and Development Authority (NYSERDA), established in 1975, is a New York State public-benefit corporation, located in Albany, New York, with regional offices in New York City, Buffalo, and West Valley.

NYSERDA offers information and analysis, programs, technical expertise, and funding aimed at helping New Yorkers increase energy efficiency, save money, use renewable energy, and reduce their reliance on fossil fuels. NYSERDA professionals are charged with protecting the environment and creating clean-energy jobs. NYSERDA collaborates with businesses, industry, the federal government, academia, the environmental community, public interest groups, and energy market participants to reduce energy consumption and greenhouse gas emissions.

== Governance ==
=== Responsibilities ===
- Conducting a multifaceted energy and environmental research and development program to meet New York State's diverse economic needs.
- Making energy more affordable for residential and low-income households.
- Helping industries, schools, hospitals, municipalities, not-for-profits, and the residential sector, including low-income residents, implement energy efficiency measures.
- Provide objective, credible, and useful energy analysis and planning to guide decisions made by major energy stakeholders in the private and public sectors.
- Managing the Western New York Nuclear Service Center at West Valley, including (1) overseeing the State's interests and share of costs at the West Valley Demonstration Project, a federal/State radioactive waste clean-up effort, and (2) managing wastes and maintaining facilities at the shut-down State Licensed Disposal Area.
- Coordinating the State's activities on nuclear energy matters including the regulation of radioactive materials, and monitoring low-level radioactive waste generation and management in the State.
- Financing energy-related projects, reducing costs for ratepayers.

=== Governance ===
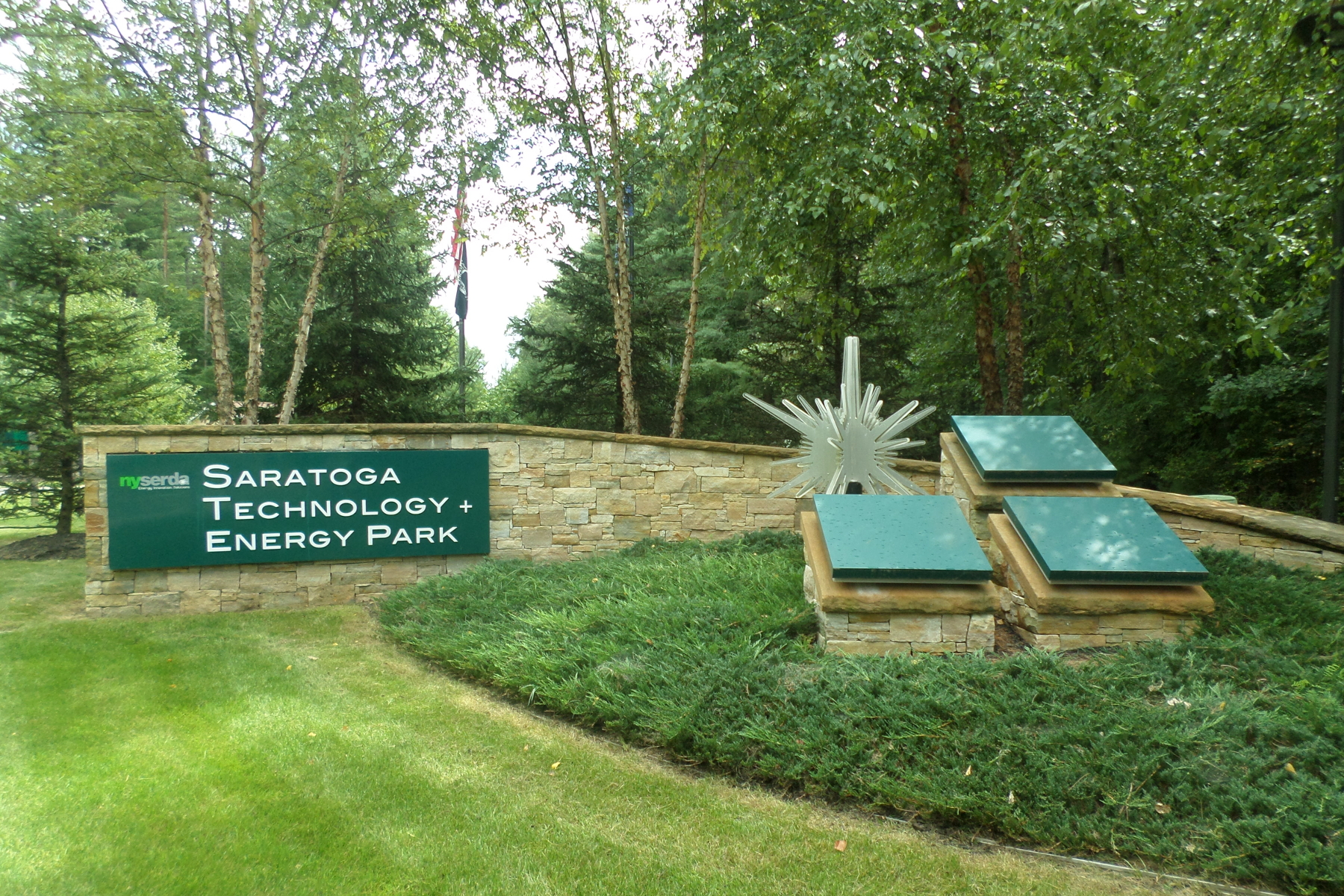
NYSERDA Saratoga Technology + Energy Park (STEP), Malta, New York

The New York State Energy Research and Development Authority (NYSERDA) is governed by a 13-member Board appointed by the Governor with advice and consent of the New York Senate.

Richard Kauffman, Chairman of Energy and Finance for New York serves as Chair of NYSERDA. Doreen Harris serves as president and Chief Executive Officer and reports directly to the Board of Directors.

The Board oversees the development of the Authority's budget and program plan, and the processes, policies and procedures in which staff are to perform their duties in their efforts to fulfill NYSERDA's mission, and in the public's interest. The Commissioners of the Departments of Environmental Conservation and Transportation and the Chairs of the New York Power Authority and New York State Public Service Commission serve ex officio. Additional members must include: research scientist(s), economist(s), not-for-profit environmentalist(s), member(s) of a not-for-profit consumer group, officer(s) of a utility primarily engaged in the distribution of gas, officer(s) of an electric utility, and three public members.

In 2017, the Authority had operating expenses of $119.76 million, an outstanding debt of $2.654 billion, and a staffing level of 326 people.

== NYSERDA Leadership ==
President and CEO
Name	Years active
Doreen Harris	April 7, 2021 to Present Acting June 2020 to April 7, 2021
Alicia Barton	June 2017 to June 2020
John Rhodes	September 2013 to June 2017
Francis J. Murray, Jr.	January 2009 to September 2013

== See also ==
- Long Island Power Authority
- New York energy law
