= Zoar Valley =

Gorges in New York, U.S

Zoar Valley Multiple Use Area
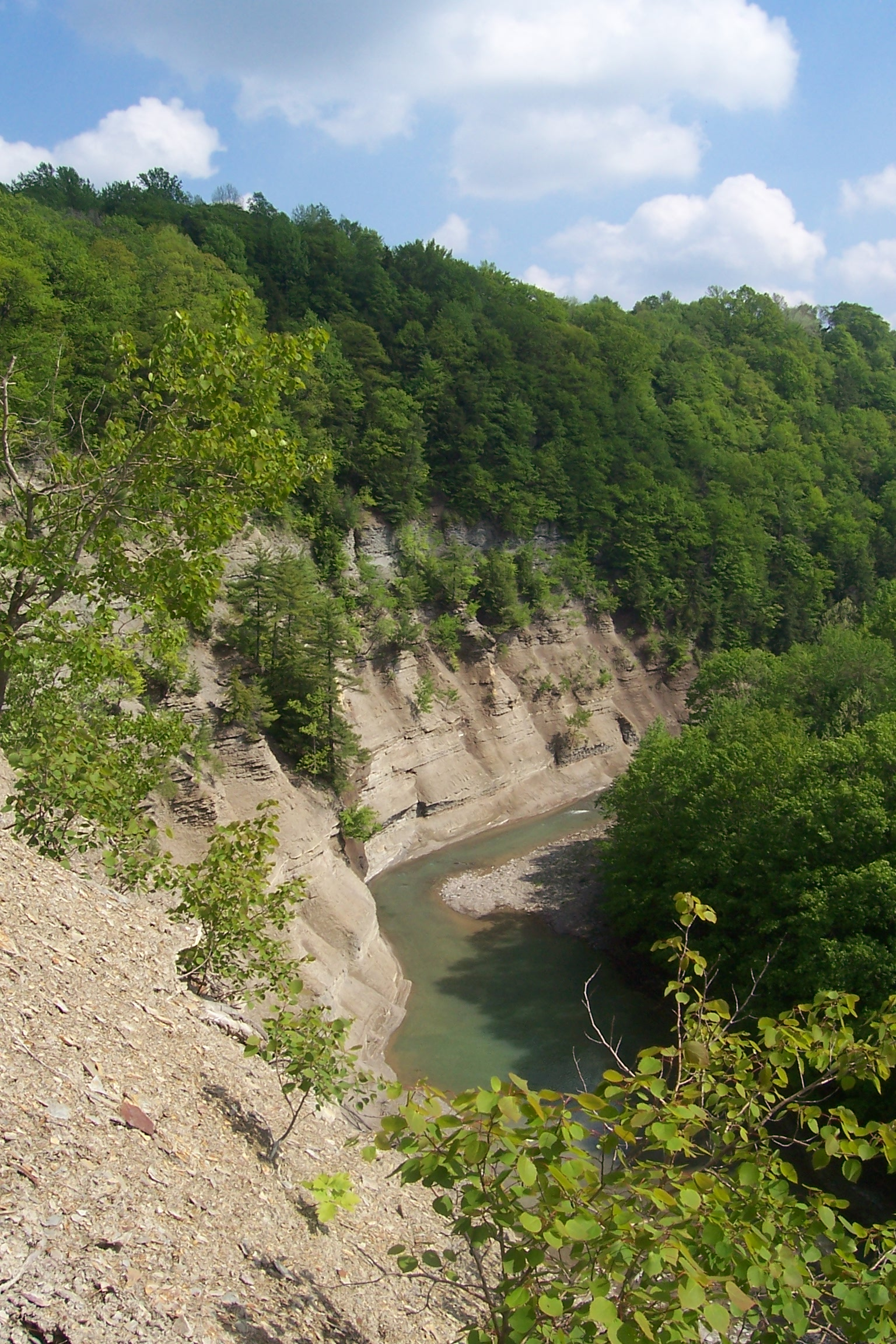
- The Cattaraugus Creek's South Branch winding through a gorge within the Zoar Valley Multiple Use Area

- Location within New York Location within the United States
- Location: Cattaraugus and Erie counties, New York
- Nearest city: Gowanda
- Coordinates: 42°26′20″N 78°53′38″W
- Area: 3,014 acres (12.20 km^{2})
- Established: 1961
- Governing body: New York State Department of Environmental Conservation

Zoar Valley is an area of deep gorges along the Main and South branches of Cattaraugus Creek in western New York, United States. The valley is located along the border of Erie County and Cattaraugus County, roughly between the villages of Gowanda to the west and Springville to the east.

The core area surrounding the confluence of the Cattaraugus Creek's Main and South branches is protected as the Zoar Valley Multiple Use Area, a conservation area located within the towns of Collins, Otto, and Persia. The protected area is managed by the New York State Department of Environmental Conservation, and is open to the public for fishing, hunting, hiking, white-water rafting, and wildlife and scenic viewing.

Canyon depths within the Zoar Valley Multiple Use Area are the greatest within the entire Cattaraugus Creek corridor, ranging up to 380 feet (120 m) along the South Branch and 480 feet (150 m) along the Main Branch. Several nearly vertical rock faces approach 400 feet (120 m) in height. The property also contains large stands of old-growth forest with trees of unusual size and height, which are further protected as part of the state-designated Zoar Valley Unique Area.

== Geography and geology ==
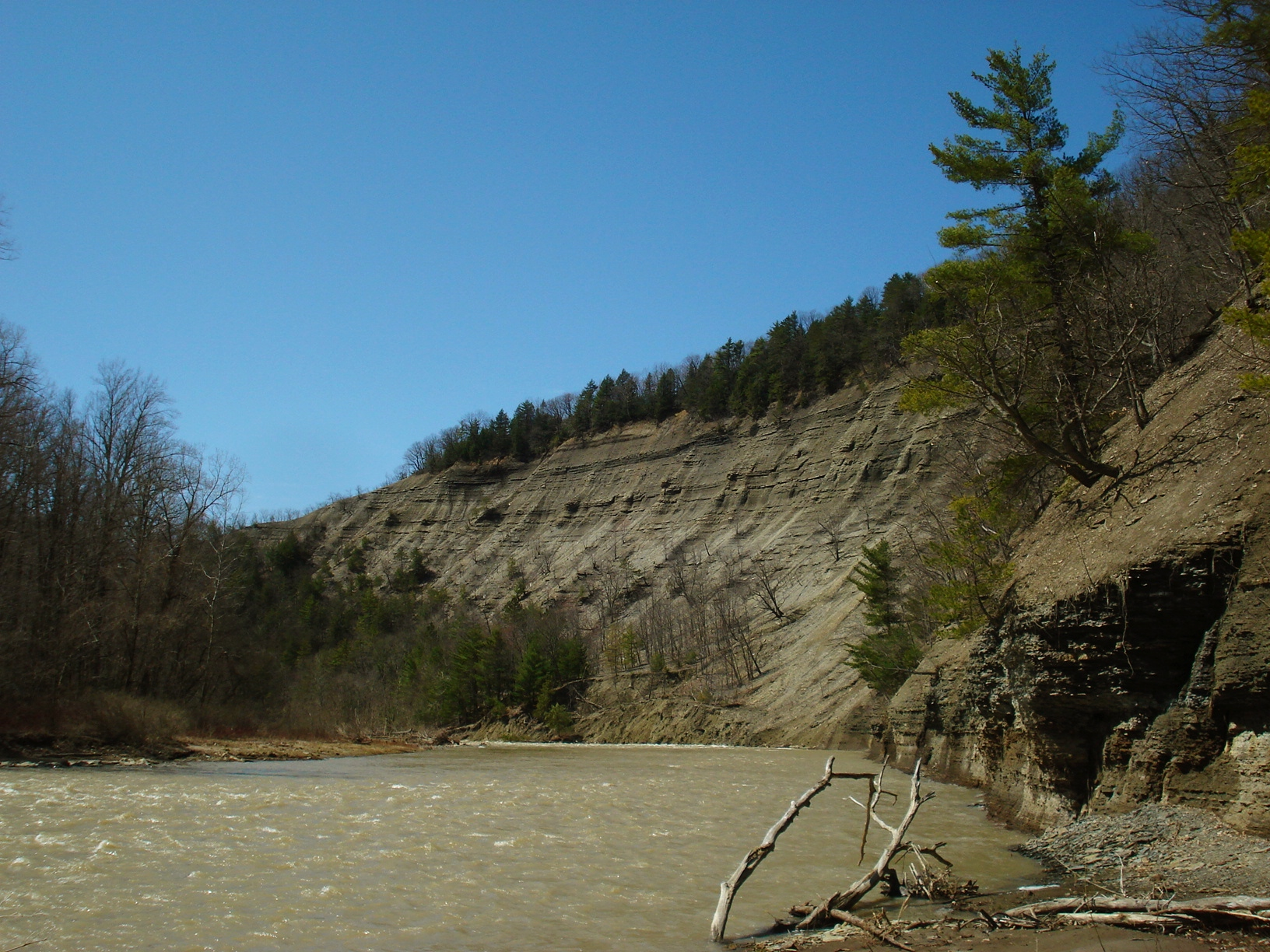
Steep cliffs of shale along the Cattaraugus Creek's Main Branch.

Zoar Valley is located along the border of Erie County and Cattaraugus County in New York, roughly between the villages of Gowanda to the west and Springville to the east. Cattaraugus Creek flows through the valley. An additional gorge formed by the Cattaraugus Creek's South Branch stretches south toward the village of Cattaraugus.

The cliffs along Zoar Valley's gorges are composed of Devonian silt stones and shale, and are part of the Canadaway Formation. The valley's gorges expose stratifications of the Onondaga Escarpment. Cliffs near the confluence of Cattaraugus Creek's South and Main branches reach heights of up to 500 feet (150 m) when measured to the tops of nearby hills.

== History ==
Zoar Valley was named by Ahaz Allen, an early 19th-century settler of the region. The name is of biblical origin, referring to the city of Zoar from the Book of Genesis.

The extent of Zoar Valley's use by Native Americans is unclear due to subsequent disturbance by farming and settlement activities; however, findings from nearby archaeological sites suggest that indigenous peoples likely made use of the area. Evidence of early use by settlers includes records of farming as early as 1842, in addition to evidence of shale mining and the establishment of two lime kilns during the early 1800s. Sawmills, gas wells, and a cheese factory were also established in the valley during the 19th century.

A Boy Scout camp was formerly located near the confluence, and a cable car was used to cross Cattaraugus Creek. Foundations of several camp buildings remain visible.

The Niagara, Lockport and Ontario Power Company purchased property near the confluence in 1926, with the intention of building a hydroelectric dam in the valley. However, the brittleness of the valley's shale cliffs was found to be unsuitable for construction of the dam, and the project was abandoned.

State ownership within the valley began in 1961 with the gift of 1,425 acres (5.77 km^{2}) by Herbert F. Darling Sr., who had purchased land from the Niagara Mohawk Power Corporation in 1952 with the intention of preserving the property. Additional lands were later added under the 1960 Multiple Use Bond Act. For a time in the 1960s, a hippie commune was located within the valley. By 1971, overnight use of the property was prohibited due to "irresponsible behavior on the part of some campers".

== Land management ==
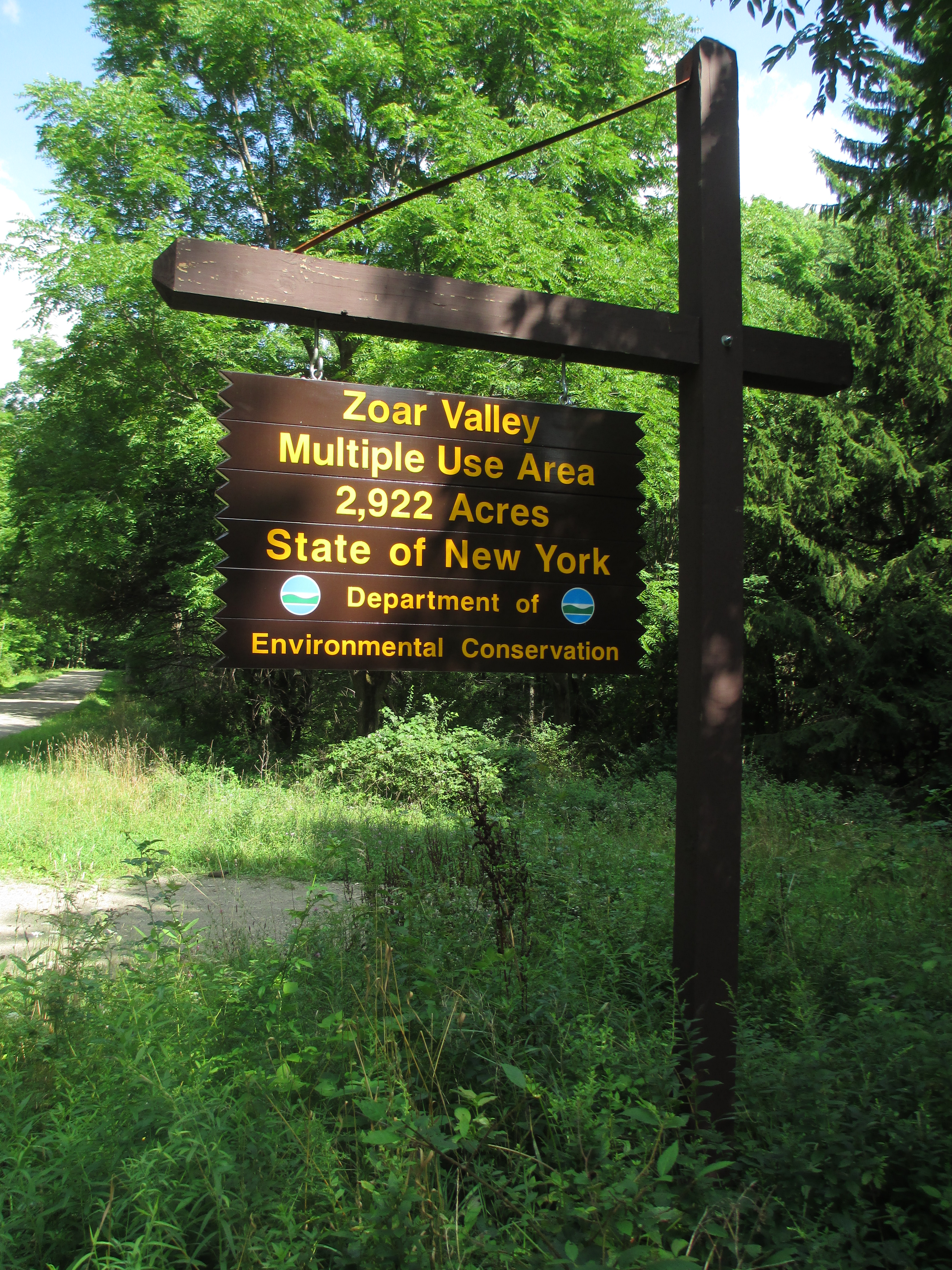
Sign at the boundary of the state-managed Zoar Valley Multiple Use Area

The state-managed Zoar Valley Multiple Use Area encompasses a 3,014-acre (12.20 km^{2}) area along an eight-mile (13 km) section of the Cattaraugus Creek's Main Branch canyon and a three-mile (5 km) stretch of the smaller South Branch, centered around the confluence of the two streams. The Multiple Use Area is maintained by the New York State Department of Environmental Conservation.

In 2007, the state established the Zoar Valley Unique Area, a 1,492-acre (6.04 km^{2}) area which further protects and preserves the entire state-owned length of the gorge's cliffs and bottomlands, in addition to a 300-foot (91 m) buffer area along the gorge's upper rim and along several larger side creeks, where sufficient state-owned land is available. The Unique Area contains the majority of the currently known or suspected old-growth forest, all of the riverside floodplain and terrace woodlands, as well as all of the slope, cliff and talus plant communities. Within the Unique Area, activities such as logging and gas drilling are prohibited. Prior to being designated as a Unique Area, the old-growth forest within the state-owned portion of Zoar Valley was at danger of being logged; the additional protection was the result of lobbying by activists and local residents.

Traditional natural resource management activities, including logging, are permitted to take place outside of the Unique Area. Approximately 343 acres (1.39 km^{2}) of plantation forests were established within the Zoar Valley Multiple Use Area during the 1960s and 1970s. Most are composed of non-native conifers, although several native hardwood plantations are present as well. Modern timber harvests by the state are intended to encourage native species growth and improve wildlife habitat. An American chestnut plantation is also maintained as a joint venture with the American Chestnut Foundation, with the goal of developing chestnut blight-resistant trees.

Additional protected lands within Zoar Valley include The Nature Conservancy's 450-acre (1.8 km^{2}) Deer Lick Nature Sanctuary, which preserves 80 acres (0.32 km^{2}) of old-growth forest and was designated as a National Natural Landmark in 1967. The sanctuary is located along the Cattaraugus Creek's South Branch, adjacent to the Zoar Valley Multiple Use Area. Two other privately owned conservation areas, the William P. Alexander Preserve and the Rodger Sweetland Memorial Preserve, are owned by the Nature Sanctuary Society of Western New York. Outside of these protected areas, old-growth forests in the valley are unprotected, and some have been clearcut in recent years.

== Ecology ==
=== Old-growth forests ===
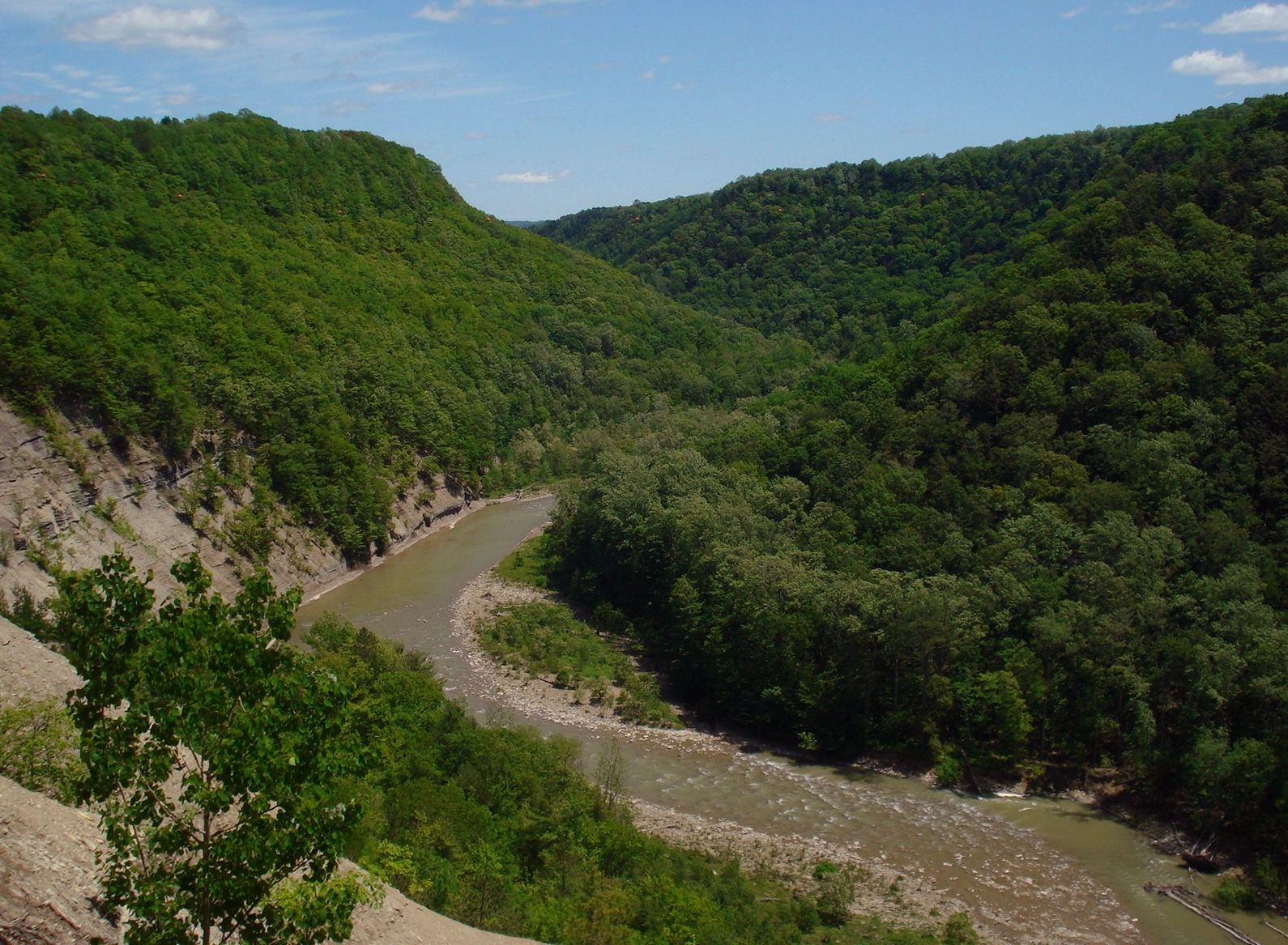
Most of Zoar Valley's old-growth forests occur within the gorge and along the valley's steep slopes.

Forests within Zoar Valley include some of the finest old-growth stands in the eastern United States. Throughout Zoar Valley, a total of 630 acres (2.5 km^{2}) of old-growth forest has been recorded; of this, nearly 400 acres (1.6 km^{2}) are found within the Zoar Valley Multiple Use Area, with an additional 80 acres (32 ha) located in the adjacent Deer Lick Nature Sanctuary. Most of the old growth is found within the Main Branch canyon, with only a few narrow corridors along steep ravines of several larger side streams. Some upland forests within the state lands are very mature in character, but these experienced timber harvesting in the 19th century and light management cutting by the state in the 1970s and 1980s.

Zoar Valley's old growth is primarily deciduous, and varies in character and species composition depending upon location and landform characteristics. Northern hardwood stands, including eastern hemlock, sugar maple, American beech, yellow birch, northern red oak, and tulip tree, are widespread, especially on mesic north-facing slopes and on the lower reaches of south-facing slopes. Similar stands are found on the raised terraces within the canyon, where old-growth trees have been noted to achieve great size, both in terms of height and diameter (typically expressed as diameter at breast height [DBH], a standard measurement taken 4.5 feet [1.4 m] above the tree's base). On drier, south-facing slopes, old-growth trees such as chestnut oak display stunted growth despite their age.

==== Bottomland forests ====
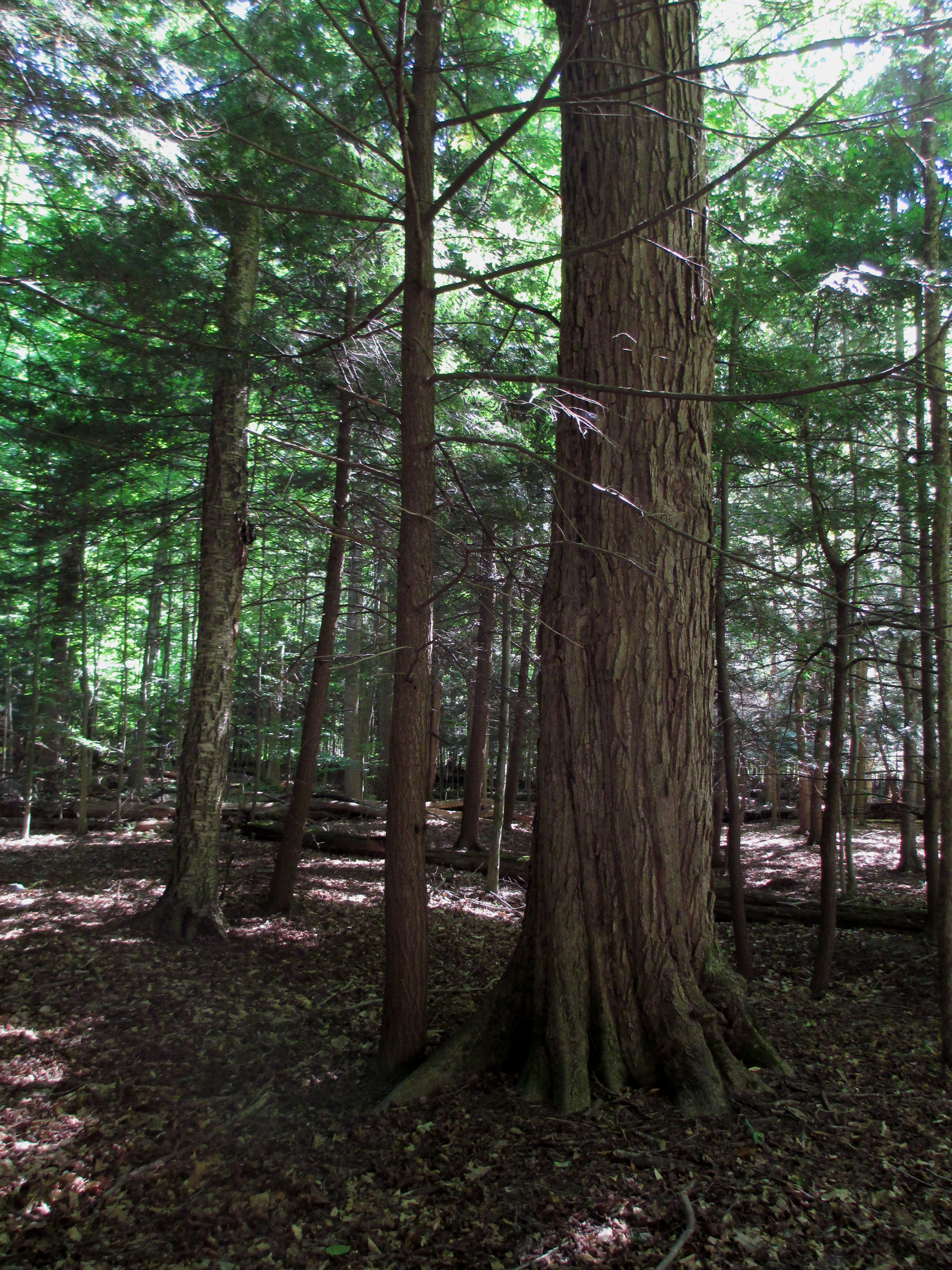
Bottomland old-growth forest along the Cattaraugus Creek's main branch

Zoar Valley's most renowned forest stands may be those found on raised terraces along Cattaraugus Creek, which includes an area of large-tree old-growth known colloquially as "The Gallery of the Giants". The river within the Main Branch canyon is bordered by a riparian zone that is sufficiently large to include landforms ranging from young floodplains recently colonized by woody pioneer species to centuries-old upper terraces containing continuous stands of large old-growth trees. Hemlock/northern hardwood stands are present and joined by additional mesophytic plant communities such as beech-maple and maple-basswood forests. There are also several bottomland groves of large and aging eastern cottonwood, American sycamore, and American elm which are likely remnants of earlier floodplain stands. An isolated sycamore, now embedded within later successional beech-maple woodlands, has been core dated to 359 years.

Species diversity along the canyon bottom is among the highest in the Northeastern United States, with more than 20 species occurring in upper-terrace old growth and approximately 10 more largely restricted to younger floodplains and/or lower terraces. Tree diameters and, especially, heights are superlative. Numerous species exceed 40 inches (100 cm) DBH, and a dozen or more represent the tallest of their kind in New York State or in the entire Northeast. Most of the gorge's canopy species reach 115 feet (35 m), however several species and individual trees attain greater heights:

- Tulip tree reaches nearly 160 feet (49 m), and sycamores reach 154 feet (47 m).
- Several white ash, bitternut hickory, and northern red oak exceed 140 feet (43 m) and a half-dozen more top 130 feet (40 m).
- Hop hornbeam and shadblow (under- to mid-story trees) reach 80 feet (24 m) - a common canopy height for much of the East's second growth.
- A 133-foot (41 m) specimen of American basswood, a species whose range does not extend to the southern Appalachians where most of the East's tallest trees reside, may be the tallest of the species.
- A 130-foot (40 m) by 40-inch (100 cm) DBH American elm, apparently unaffected by Dutch elm disease, may be the largest forest-grown elm in the Northeast.

==== Slope forests ====
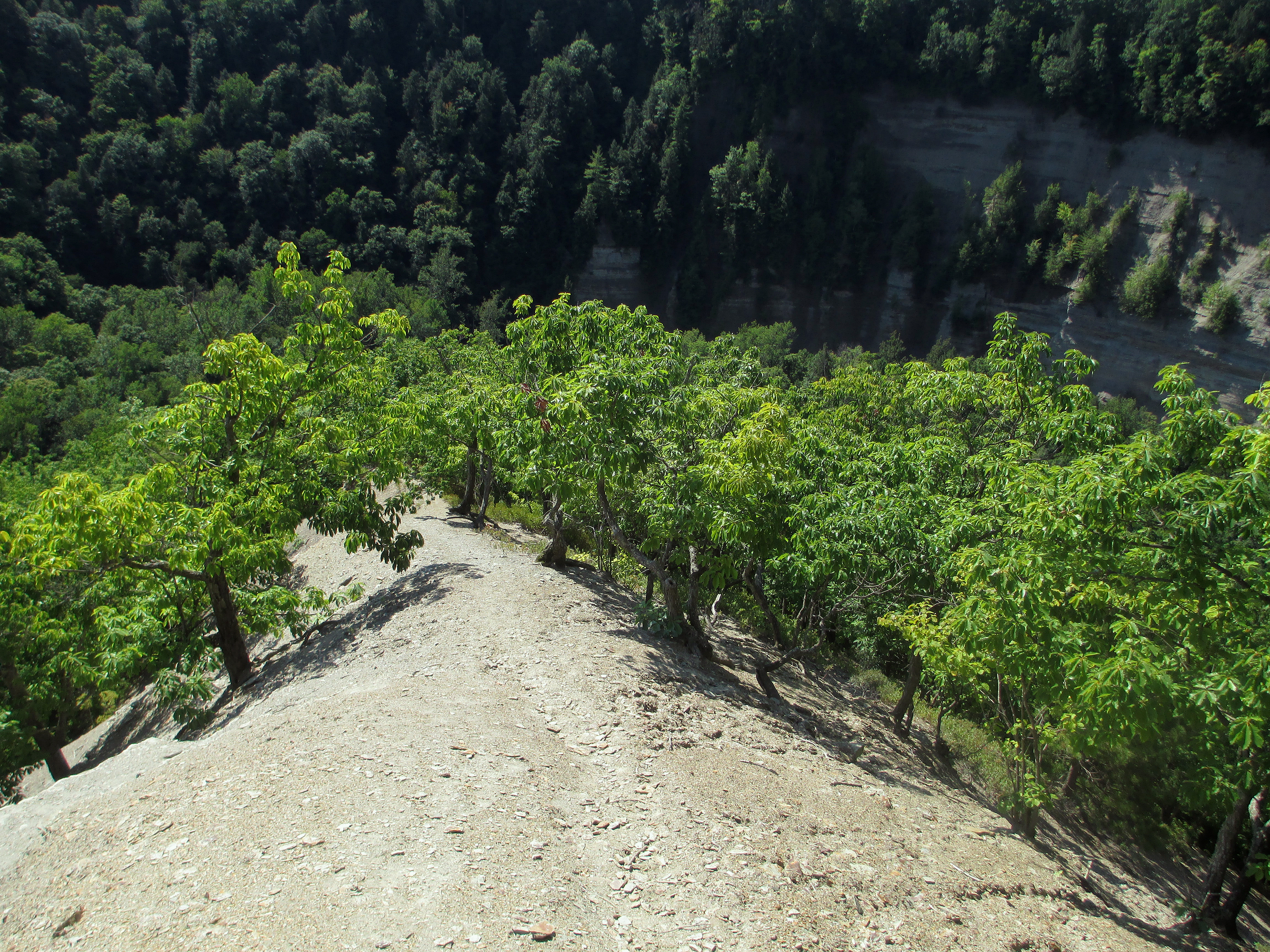
Stunted chestnut oak trees growing on a dry ridge south of the Cattaraugus Creek's main branch. Despite their size, these trees often attain great age.

Trees growing on the slopes are generally moderate in size; most are less than 24 inches (61 cm) DBH, although scattered trees can be much larger. Despite their moderate size, many trees are exceptionally old. An eastern hemlock of only 16 inches (41 cm) DBH has been core dated to 410 years at breast height and may be 450 to 500 years at ground level. These slope woodlands present an impressive and ancient aesthetic, but few stands can be visited directly as most slopes are too dangerous to traverse.

An interesting and likewise very old forest is found on the exposed and sun-baked upper reaches of south-facing slopes, which are quite xeric despite the humid regional climate. Here are found diminutive and gnarled chestnut oak, northern red oak, and red pine that are typically less than 20 feet (6.1 m) tall and 12 inches (30 cm) in diameter. Despite their small size these trees can exceed 165 years at breast height.

=== Rivers and streams ===
Cattaraugus Creek is a fifth to sixth-order stream (depending upon the exact delineation of headwater tributaries), and is the largest tributary to eastern Lake Erie. Flow is highly variable, and can range from typical summer lows of less than 300 cu ft/s (8.5 m^{3}/s) to floods exceeding 30,000 cu ft/s (850 m^{3}/s). The river is safe to cross at low flows but rapidly becomes treacherous as water rises.

Ecological integrity and environmental health of the Cattaraugus are generally good. The river edge and immediate riparian zone are largely intact for most of the river's length. There is only one dam on the main stream, located within Scoby Dam Park about 20 miles (32 km) upstream from the Zoar Valley Multiple Use Area. Although a barrier to fish, it does not regulate flow. Sediment load and siltation are Cattaraugus Creek's main environmental issues, and the stream regularly experiences elevated turbidity due to suspended sediments. Some of this sediment load is derived from silt/clay tills common along the river, but some likely stems from agricultural activities. As is the case with many streams draining agricultural lands, fecal coliform levels can be elevated at high flows. During summer storm events, especially after a prolonged dry period, bacterial levels can exceed 10,000 colony forming units (cfu); bacterial levels are low most other times.

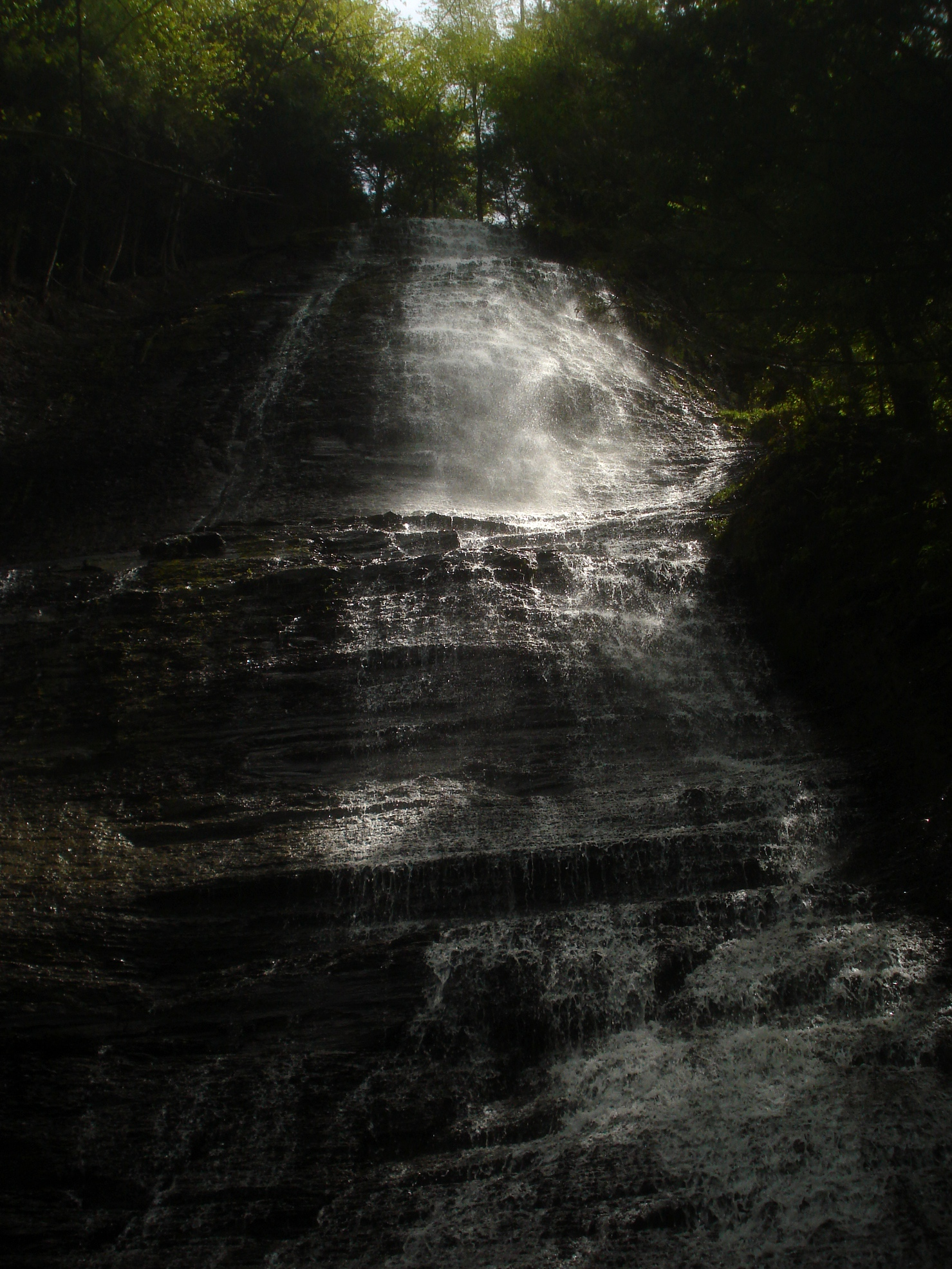
One of many cascading waterfalls found along Zoar Valley's edges

Numerous small waterfalls cascade into the Zoar Valley canyon. Most are cascades, but there are a few straight drops of greater than 100 feet (30 m). Above the falls are dozens of small headwater streams that drain the surrounding uplands. These streams and the Cattaraugus Creek were extensively disturbed by an intense flash flood in August 2009.

== Recreation ==
Zoar Valley is a popular regional destination for outdoor recreation. The Zoar Valley Multiple Use Area is open to the public for activities including fishing, hunting, hiking, white-water rafting, and nature study. The area is closed between sunset and sunrise, and camping is not permitted on the property.

As the area is not officially a park, there are few safety barriers in place to prevent falls into the gorge. The area is known for occasional deaths, injuries and rescues, often for visitors unfamiliar with the dangers of the rugged landscape. Many injuries occur on private lands adjacent to the state-owned area; as such, neighboring landowners have become increasingly intolerant of trespassers, while the state has increased patrols and arrests for trespassing and other prohibited behavior.

Only one hiking trail is officially maintained within the Multiple Use Area. The two-mile (3.2 km) Holcomb Pond Trail links two separate parking areas on Vail Road, and traverses through forest and along the gorge edge in the northern section of the property. Unofficial and unmarked trails can be found throughout the property, including a trail to access the gorge's bottom that begins at the parking area on Valentine Flats Road. Additional parking areas are located on Button Road and Forty Road.

=== Sportfishing ===
Cattaraugus Creek is a noted steelhead trout stream, ranked ninth-best east of the Rocky Mountains by American Angler magazine in 2006. Native brook trout are also regularly caught. Both fish successfully spawn in the river and/or its tributaries. In 2015, Cattaraugus Creek was stocked with 30,000 steelhead and 7,840 brown trout; an additional 1,030 brown trout were stocked in the creek's South Branch that year as well. Additional fishing opportunities within the Multiple Use Area are available at Holcomb Pond and Ross Pond.

Anglers primarily target steelhead between September and May, and brown trout between September and December, at which time these fish enter the stream to complete their annual spawning runs. Chinook salmon, coho salmon, and pink salmon may be caught during the fall as well, however these fish have not been stocked for many years and their small populations are the result of limited natural reproduction.

=== Whitewater rafting ===
The valley also supports whitewater rafting when water levels are sufficient. The Main Branch offers class II and III rapids, while the South Branch includes class II, III and IV rapids, depending on water level. A designated put-in for the Main Branch is maintained at a state fishing access site on North Otto Road; access to the South Branch requires permission from private landowners. The take out is located downstream of the Aldrich Street bridge in Gowanda.

== See also ==
- Zoar, New York
