= West Valley Central School =

Location
- 5359 School St; West Valley, New York 14171; United States
- Coordinates: 42°24′16″N 78°36′26″W

Information
- Type: Public
- School district: West Valley Central School District
- NCES District ID: 3630900
- Superintendent: Dr. Taweepon Farrar
- NCES School ID: 363090004153
- Principal: Dan Amodeo
- Teaching staff: 30.39 (on an FTE basis)
- Grades: PK-12
- Enrollment: 186 (2024-2025)
- Student to teacher ratio: 6.12
- Campus: Rural: Distant
- Colors: Purple and Gold
- Athletics conference: Class A
- Mascot: Wildcats
- Yearbook: Vallian
- Website: www.wvalley.org

West Valley Central School, known locally as WVCS, is a K-12 school located in West Valley, an unincorporated hamlet in the town of Ashford, New York. Due to Ashford's relatively small population and the district's limited geographic size, the school serves only a few hundred students. There are separate wings for the elementary, middle, and high school, although some rooms in the school are shared, such as the cafeteria, gymnasium, and auditorium.

There are many extracurricular activities. The school no longer has its own athletic department but has an agreement with Ellicottville Central School to allow student-athletes to play for their teams. This merger will end at the end of the 2019 school year.

Because of the school's small size and enrollment, the school has discussed the possibility of merging with neighboring districts, but a straw poll to gauge support for a merger with Ellicottville Central School returned a negative response in the late 2000s. Other neighboring districts have been suggested as possible merger partners for West Valley, but none have shown significant interest.
