= Ellicottville, New York =

Ellicottville, New York Seneca: Hadíashë́dahgwá'geh
- Town
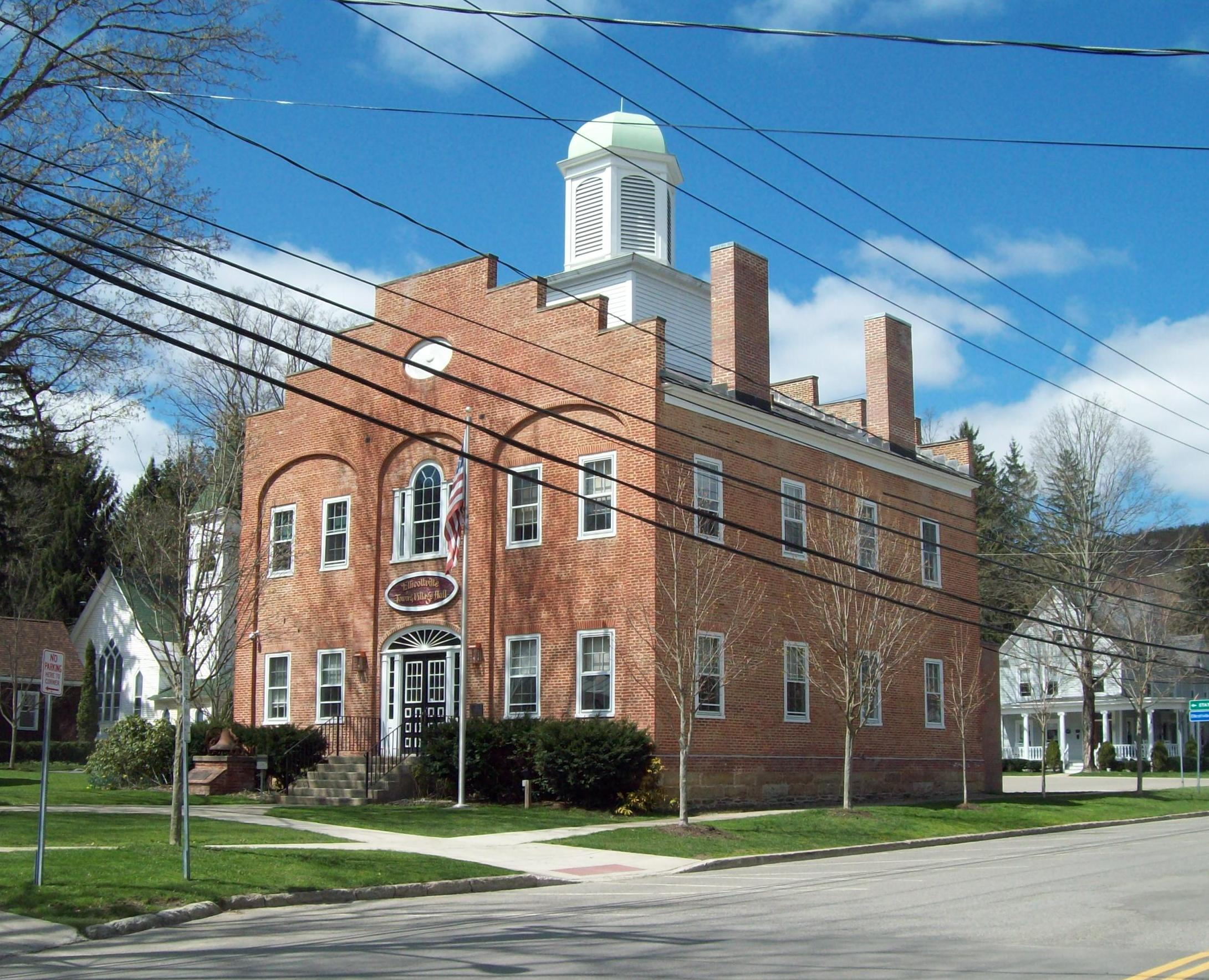
- Town hall

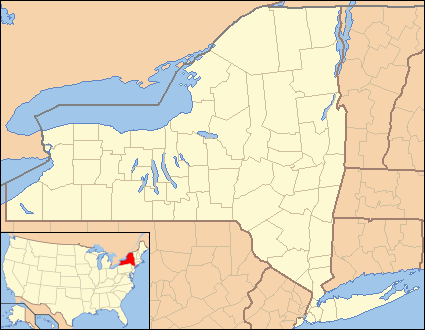
- Location within the state of New York
- Coordinates: 42°16′29″N 78°40′20″W
- Country: United States
- State: New York
- County: Cattaraugus

Government
  - Type: Town Council
  - Town Supervisor: Matthew McAndrew (D)
  - Town Council: Members: • Gregory Fitzpatrick (R); • Kenneth Hinman (D, R); • John D. Northrup (D, R); • Steven J. Crowley (D)

Area
  - Total: 45.19 sq mi (117.03 km^{2})
  - Land: 45.09 sq mi (116.79 km^{2})
  - Water: 0.093 sq mi (0.24 km^{2})

Population (2020)
  - Total: 1,317
  - Estimate (2021): 1,311
  - Density: 35.5/sq mi (13.69/km^{2})
- Time zone: UTC-5 (Eastern (EST))
  - Summer (DST): UTC-4 (EDT)
- ZIP Codes: 14731 (Ellicottville); 14101 (Machias); 14171 (West Valley)
- FIPS code: 36-009-24031
- Website: www.townofellicottvilleny.gov

Ellicottville (Seneca: Hadíashë́dahgwá'geh, lit. 'place where they used to hold councils') is a town in Cattaraugus County, New York, United States. The population was 1,317 at the 2020 census. The town is named after Joseph Ellicott, principal land agent of the Holland Land Company.

The town of Ellicottville includes a village also called Ellicottville. The town is in the north-central part of the county, north of the city of Salamanca.

== History ==
The indigenous Seneca people know the town as Hadíashë́dahgwá'geh, or 'place where they used to hold councils'.

The town was first settled by Europeans circa 1815.

The Town of Ellicottville was established in 1820 from the town of Franklinville (then known as Ischua). The town lost some of its territory when the town of Ashford was formed in 1824. In 1858, a small part of the town was taken to aid the formation of the town of East Otto.

The Village of Ellicottville was formerly the county seat for Cattaraugus County. The county seat moved to Little Valley in May 1868.

The John J. Aiken House and Bryant Hill Cemetery are listed on the National Register of Historic Places.

== Gentrification ==
Since the establishments of the Holimont and Holiday Valley ski resorts in the town, Ellicottville has seen massive gentrification as mostly Canadian ski enthusiasts have taken up part-time residences in the town. Property values in the town are significantly higher than in the rest of the county. Because the village has restrictive zoning laws that discourage national franchises from entering the village, these types of restaurants have located just outside the village limits. Also in Ellicottville is an unnamed dual-purpose venue that hosts the Ellicottville Championship Rodeo each Independence Day weekend and the Nightmare Hayrides in October.

== Geography ==
According to the United States Census Bureau, the town has a total area of 45.2 square miles (117.0 km^{2}), of which 45.1 square miles (116.8 km^{2}) is land and 0.08 square miles (0.2 km^{2}), or 0.21%, is water.

Great Valley Creek, a tributary of the Allegheny River, flows through the town. U.S. Route 219, linking the town to the suburbs of Buffalo to the north and to Salamanca to the south, passes through the town. New York State Route 242 runs east–west through the town, intersecting US 219 in the village of Ellicottville. New York State Route 240 ends at NY 242 in the hamlet of Ashford, in the northeast part of the town.

=== Adjacent towns and areas ===
Ellicottville is south of the town of Ashford. The west town line is shared with the towns of East Otto and Mansfield. Ellicottville is north of the town of Great Valley. Ellicottville's east town line is shared with the towns of Franklinville and Machias.

=== Climate ===
Climate data for Ellicottville, NY
Month	Jan	Feb	Mar	Apr	May	Jun	Jul	Aug	Sep	Oct	Nov	Dec	Year
Record high °F (°C)	70 (21)	67 (19)	80 (27)	88 (31)	89 (32)	95 (35)	96 (36)	94 (34)	95 (35)	86 (30)	77 (25)	71 (22)	96 (36)
Mean daily maximum °F (°C)	30 (−1)	33 (1)	41 (5)	55 (13)	66 (19)	75 (24)	78 (26)	77 (25)	70 (21)	58 (14)	47 (8)	34 (1)	55 (13)
Daily mean °F (°C)	22 (−6)	23 (−5)	31 (−1)	44 (7)	54 (12)	63 (17)	67 (19)	66 (19)	59 (15)	48 (9)	39 (4)	27 (−3)	45 (7)
Mean daily minimum °F (°C)	13 (−11)	13 (−11)	20 (−7)	32 (0)	41 (5)	51 (11)	55 (13)	54 (12)	47 (8)	37 (3)	30 (−1)	20 (−7)	34 (1)
Record low °F (°C)	−26 (−32)	−28 (−33)	−18 (−28)	5 (−15)	20 (−7)	29 (−2)	34 (1)	31 (−1)	22 (−6)	14 (−10)	−5 (−21)	−22 (−30)	−28 (−33)
Average precipitation inches (mm)	3.75 (95)	2.85 (72)	3.45 (88)	3.68 (93)	3.73 (95)	4.48 (114)	4.72 (120)	4.19 (106)	4.53 (115)	4.19 (106)	4.31 (109)	4.09 (104)	48.0 (1,220)
Source: The Weather Channel (Historical Monthly Averages)

== Demographics ==
Historical population
Census	Pop.	Note	%±
1830	626		—
1840	1,084		73.2%
1850	1,725		59.1%
1860	1,881		9.0%
1870	1,833		−2.6%
1880	1,949		6.3%
1890	1,932		−0.9%
1900	2,038		5.5%
1910	2,067		1.4%
1920	1,766		−14.6%
1930	1,793		1.5%
1940	1,790		−0.2%
1950	1,830		2.2%
1960	1,968		7.5%
1970	1,779		−9.6%
1980	1,677		−5.7%
1990	1,607		−4.2%
2000	1,738		8.2%
2010	1,598		−8.1%
2020	1,317		−17.6%
2021 (est.)	1,311	▼	−0.5%
U.S. Decennial Census

As of the census of 2000, there were 1,738 people, 770 households, and 462 families residing in the town. The population density was 38.5 inhabitants per square mile (14.9/km^{2}). There were 2,097 housing units at an average density of 46.5 per square mile (18.0/km^{2}). The racial makeup of the town was 98.16% White, 0.17% Black or African American, 0.69% Native American, 0.35% Asian, 0.23% from other races, and 0.40% from two or more races. Hispanic or Latino of any race were 0.86% of the population.

There were 770 households, out of which 22.9% had children under the age of 18 living with them, 50.5% were married couples living together, 7.1% had a female householder with no husband present, and 40.0% were non-families. 34.4% of all households were made up of individuals, and 12.7% had someone living alone who was 65 years of age or older. The average household size was 2.24 and the average family size was 2.86.

In the town, the population was spread out, with 22.2% under the age of 18, 5.4% from 18 to 24, 25.4% from 25 to 44, 29.8% from 45 to 64, and 17.3% who were 65 years of age or older. The median age was 43 years. For every 100 females, there were 97.1 males. For every 100 females age 18 and over, there were 95.9 males.

The median income for a household in the town was $43,571, and the median income for a family was $50,813. Males had a median income of $40,000 versus $21,818 for females. The per capita income for the town was $23,291. About 5.5% of families and 7.7% of the population were below the poverty line, including 8.9% of those under age 18 and 8.3% of those age 65 or over.

== Communities and locations in the Town of Ellicottville ==
- Ashford Junction – A hamlet near the east town line at the junction of NY Route 240 and NY Route 242.
- Ellicottville – The village of Ellicottville is in the southwest corner of the town on US Route 219 and NY Route 242.
- Fancy Tract – A location on the eastern town line in the north part of the town.
- Holiday Valley – A ski resort south of Ellicottville village.
- HoliMont – A semi-private ski resort west of Ellicottville village.
- Plato – The hamlet is in the northwest corner of the town on County Road 75.

=== Points of interest ===
- Nannen Arboretum – An arboretum north of Ellicottville village.
