= Deer Lick Nature Sanctuary =

Protected forest and gorge in Cattaraugus County, New York

- Location within New York
- Location: Cattaraugus County, New York
- Nearest city: Gowanda
- Coordinates: 42.42105°N 78.90568°W
- Area: 398 acres (1.61 km^{2})
- Established: 1960

U.S. National Natural Landmark
- Designated: 1967

Deer Lick Nature Sanctuary is a protected forest and gorge in Cattaraugus County, New York. The preserve is within Zoar Valley near Gowanda, and is managed by The Nature Conservancy.

== History ==
Deer Lick Nature Sanctuary was created by a donation from Miss Evelyn Alverson to The Nature Conservancy in 1960 with a further donation of Deer Lick Falls by Herbert F. Darling. It was designated a National Natural Landmark in November 1967 for its mature hardwood forest and its gorges which highlight the Onondaga Escarpment.

As of 2005, the preserve covered 450 acres (1.8 km^{2}), 80 acres (0.32 km^{2}) of which contain old-growth forest. The south fork of the Cattaraugus Creek runs alongside part of the preserve. In 2006 the preserve expanded via grants and purchases. There are 11 miles (18 km) of hiking trails open to the public.

== See also ==
- List of National Natural Landmarks in New York
