= Nuclear Fuel Services =

American fuel supplier company

Nuclear Fuel Services Inc. (NFS) is an American company that has been a major supplier of fuel for the United States Navy's fleet of nuclear-powered vessels since the 1960s. In recent years it has also reprocessed weapons-grade uranium into nuclear reactor fuel. It operates a 65-acre (260,000 m^{2}) gated complex in Erwin, Tennessee. NFS's original facility was based in Ashford, New York from 1964 to 1972, a site now known as the West Valley Demonstration Project. NFS is a subsidiary of BWX Technologies, Inc.

The company has emerged as America's leader in converting surplus weapons-grade uranium from U.S. Cold War stockpiles into valuable low-enriched uranium fuel material to power commercial nuclear power plants. Known as downblending, the proprietary NFS process is currently being used to convert about 40 metric tons of highly enriched uranium (HEU) into fuel material for the Tennessee Valley Authority. In 2007, the company was also awarded a contract by the U.S. Department of Energy's (DOE) National Nuclear Security Administration to convert 17.4 metric tons of HEU into material for America's Reliable Fuel Supply Program.

The company's downblending is also an important resource for the round up of other nuclear materials around the world to reduce the chance of proliferation by rogue nations or terrorists. NFS is also engaged as a team member at important nuclear projects at other DOE sites, such as the Mixed Oxide (MOX) Fuel Fabrication Facility at Savannah River and the cleanup of an old laboratory at the Oak Ridge National Laboratory.

== NRC events ==
On May 11, 2008, the Nuclear Regulatory Commission released information on emergency notification of two 2006 incidents at the Erwin plant. The first incident involved a leak of liquid containing highly enriched uranium, which could have resulted in a criticality incident.

The second incident involved an unmanaged 'accumulation point' - where a critical mass of uranium could have accumulated - was discovered while reacting to the first incident. In other words, no system protections were in place to prevent a solution leak from entering the bottom of an elevator shaft in the plant.

The result of material accumulated in a confined space could be a criticality incident.
