= Bryant Hill Cemetery =

Historic cemetery in New York, United States

- U.S. National Register of Historic Places
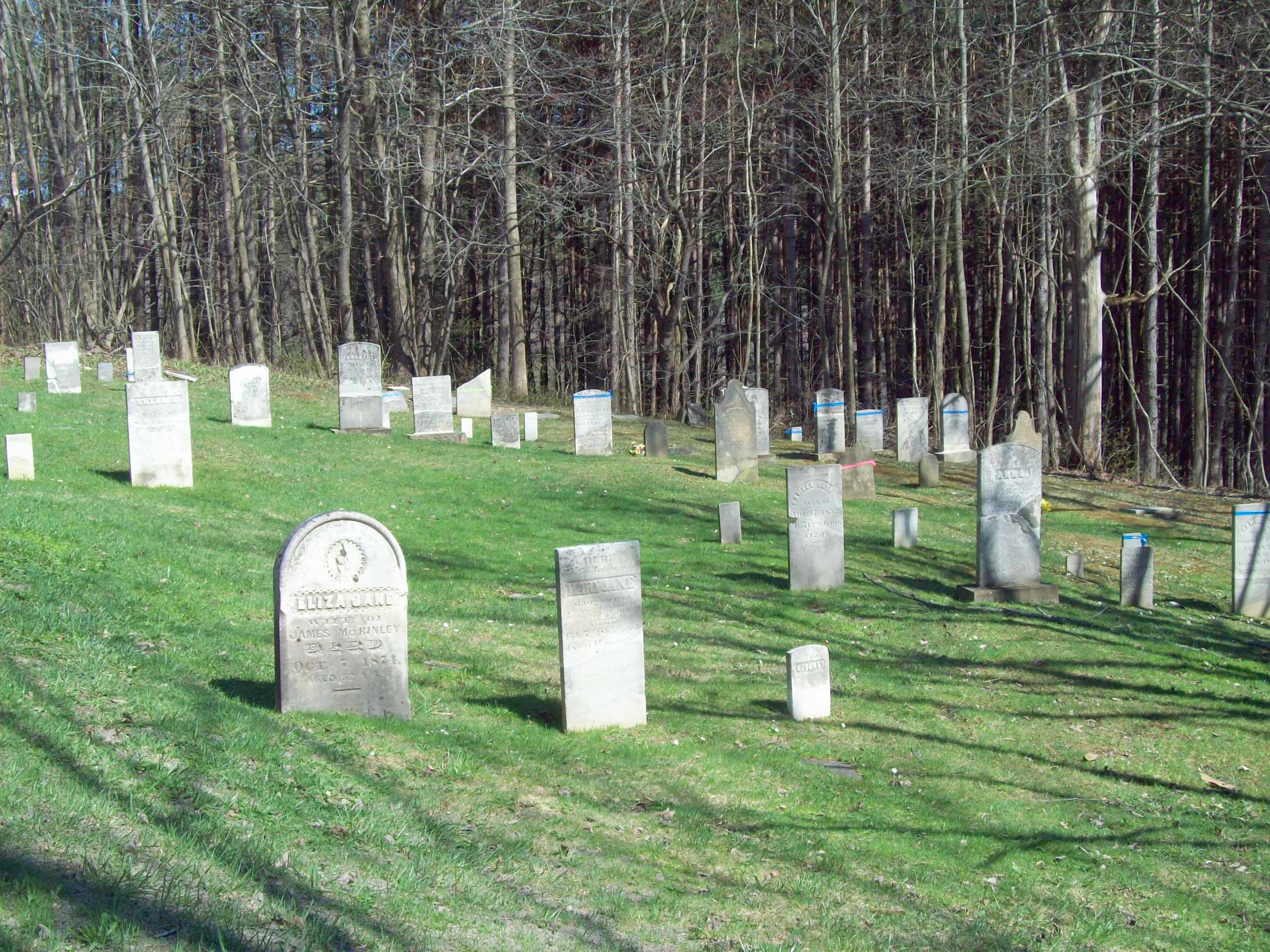
- Bryant Hill Cemetery, April 2010

- Location within New York Location within the United States
- Location: Bryant Hill Rd. near Crane Rd., Ellicottville, New York
- Coordinates: 42°18′19″N 78°36′7″W
- Built: 1821
- NRHP reference No.: 03000605
- Added to NRHP: July 05, 2003

Bryant Hill Cemetery is a historic cemetery located at Ellicottville in Cattaraugus County, New York, United States. In 1821, Samuel Bryant set aside land to serve as the first cemetery at Ellicottville; the first burial was in 1824 and the last in 1901. Restoration of the cemetery began in 1970, and it became the property of the town of Ellicottville in 1976. It is the final resting site for many of the area's early New England settlers.

It was listed on the National Register of Historic Places in 2003.
