= Cattaraugus Creek =

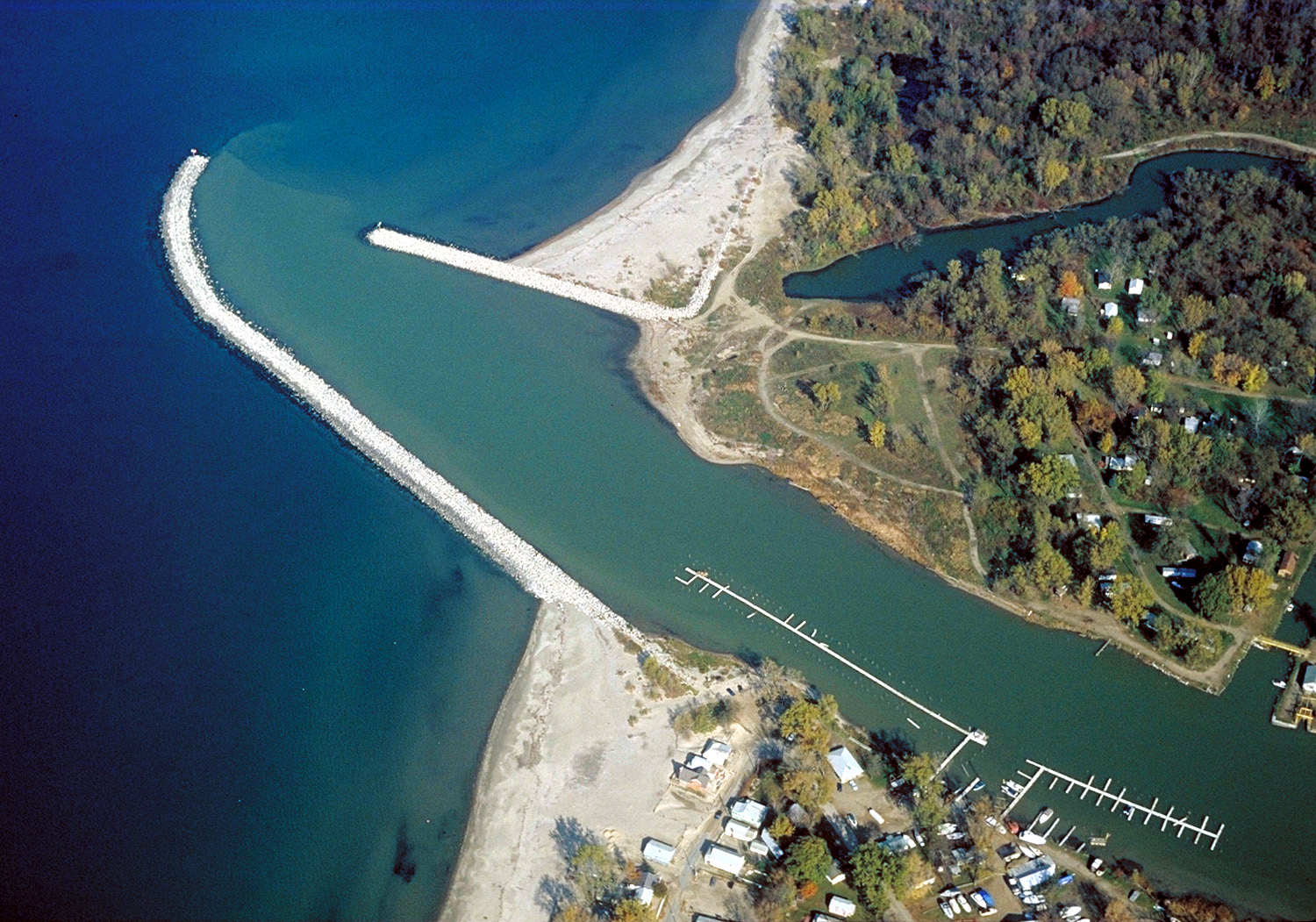
- The mouth of Cattaraugus Creek on Lake Erie near Sunset Bay, New York.

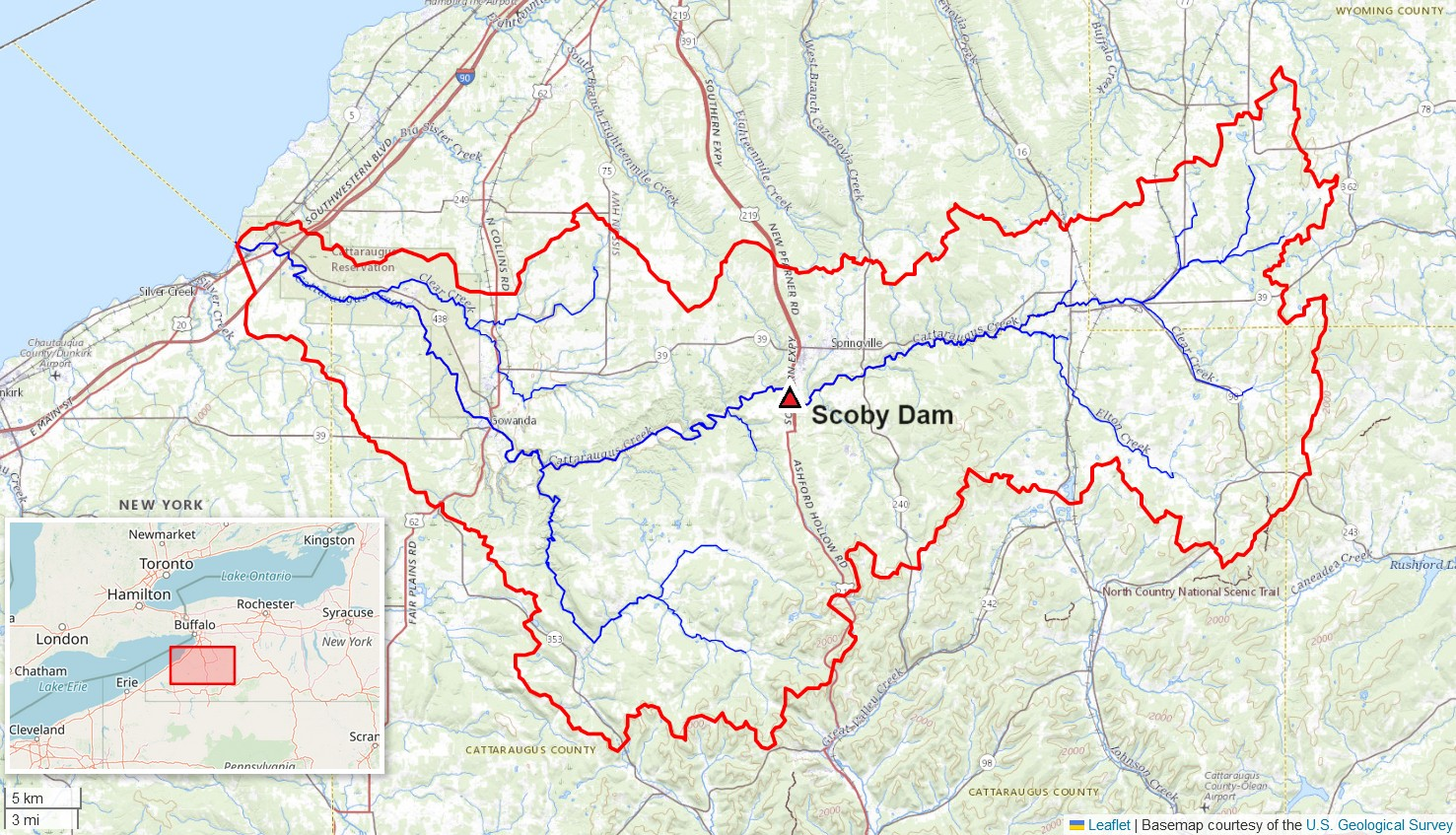
- Cattaraugus Creek Watershed (Interactive map)

- Location of the mouth of Cattaraugus Creek in New York State. Cattaraugus Creek (the United States)

Location
- Country: United States
- State: New York

Physical characteristics
- Source: Java Lake
  - location: Java, Wyoming County
  - coordinates: 42°37′43″N 78°20′24″W
- Mouth: Lake Erie
  - location: Sunset Bay, Erie County
  - coordinates: 42°34′14″N 79°08′14″W
- Length: 68 mi (109 km)
- Basin size: 559 sq mi (1,450 km^{2})

Cattaraugus Creek is a stream, approximately 68 miles (109 km) long, in western New York in the United States. The creek drains a wooded rural portion of western New York southwest of Buffalo into Lake Erie. In its lower course it flows primarily through the Cattaraugus Reservation of the Seneca Nation of Indians.

== Etymology ==
William Beauchamp identifies the name Cattaraugus as deriving from the Seneca word Gah-ta-ra-ke-ras, meaning "stinking shore" or "foul-smelling river bank." This in turn is likely a loanword from an extinct Attiwandiron, Eriehronon, Wenrohronon, or Wendat (Huron) language, combining the verb root -i'tar-, referring to clay or mud, and -akera(n)-, describing a bad or strong odor: hence, tke'tarakeras, place of strong-smelling mud or clay. (The Seneca language has lost a distinct R sound; the Seneca language equivalent, Canawaugus, was originally used for a site further east.) In modern Seneca, Cattaraugus is known as Ga’dä꞉gë́sgë꞉öʼ, meaning 'the clay used to stink.' The name is a result of the natural gas that oozes from the river mud.

== Description ==
The creek rises in Java Lake in Wyoming County. In the village of Arcade it is joined by Clear Creek. It flows westward out of Wyoming County to the hamlet of Yorkshire, where the creek becomes the boundary between Erie County to the north and Cattaraugus County to the south. Near Springville, the creek is impounded by the Scoby Dam. From Springville to Gowanda, Cattaraugus Creek passes through the Zoar Valley Multiple Use Area. This conservation zone is a favorite recreation area for fishing and rafting. The South Branch of Cattaraugus Creek, also known as Skinner Hollow, originates in East Otto and flows southwest into the village of Cattaraugus before veering northwest to Cattaraugus Creek along the Persia-Otto town line, joining the main creek just east of Gowanda, a village that straddles the main stem of the creek and is thereby in two counties. Along its lower course Cattaraugus Creek flows past the hamlet of Versailles, on the south bank of the creek in the Cattaraugus Reservation. For its final miles, the creek forms the border between Erie County and Chautauqua County, then flows into Lake Erie by Sunset Bay in the town of Hanover in Chautauqua County.

== Fishing ==
Each year around October to November, thousands of anglers descend on the lower course of Cattaraugus Creek to take advantage of the annual steelhead trout runs.

Currently, the extent of steelhead migration up Cattaraugus Creek is limited by the Scoby Dam near Springville. However, a proposal to lower the currently 38-foot (12 m) dam by about 30 feet (9.1 m) was put forth by the U.S. Army Corps of Engineers in 2014. If approved, the dam's lowering and the installation of a fish ladder would allow steelhead to move into an additional 44 miles (71 km) of Cattaraugus Creek and its tributaries. The $6.6 million (USD) project would allow anglers to seek steelhead at an additional 34 miles (55 km) of public stream access, a large increase over the current four miles (6.4 km) of the stream that is currently publicly accessible for fishing below the dam.

The dam's removal could also allow Cattaraugus Creek's steelhead populations to become more self-sustaining as they gain access to suitable spawning habitats available above the dam. Currently, the steelhead fishery is maintained only through annual stocking of fish.

Critics of the project have raised concerns about impacts on resident brown and rainbow trout populations above the dam, and the possibility of introducing invasive species such as the sea lamprey into stretches of the creek currently free of such organisms. The USACE proposal includes barriers that are intended to restrict the movement of sea lamprey beyond the dam.

== Flooding ==
The creek is prone to rapid flooding, and two significant floods hit the creek in 2009 and 2014.

== Environmental issues ==
The New York State Department of Environmental Conservation describes Cattaraugus Creek as "one of the healthiest watersheds in the area." Potential threats to the creek's ecosystem include deforestation of the surrounding area, overdevelopment of the Zoar Valley, and invasive species.

=== Nuclear waste ===
Nuclear waste has contaminated Cattaraugus Creek and other areas around West Valley, New York. Although almost all of the high-level nuclear waste has been removed, according to the Department of Energy (DOE), nuclear and hazardous wastes are still buried in unlined trenches on two sites at a former privately operated nuclear fuel reprocessing facility alongside Cattaraugus Creek north of the village of West Valley in Cattaraugus County. The DOE's Demonstration Project at the site transferred high-level nuclear waste into glass canisters. Reprocessing of spent fuel rods from military and civilian nuclear power plants between 1966 and 1972 resulted in burial of low-level radioactive waste (LLRW) on 22 acres (89,000 m^{2}) and burial of high-level radioactive waste on another 7 acres (28,000 m^{2}) there.

The facility that created the nuclear waste there closed in 1972, and was begun in 1961 by Nuclear Fuel Services (NFS), a subsidiary of W.R. Grace & Co. (the focus of the book and film A Civil Action) and American Machine & Foundry, on 3,345 acres (13.54 km^{2}) of land leased from the State of New York. The Atomic Energy Commission reported in 1966 that 5 million US gallons (19,000 m^{3}) of liquid radioactive wastes were discharged into on-site streams and Cattaraugus Creek, into which on-site streams flow. These activities were authorized by the State of New York, title owner of the entire site through its agency, the New York State Energy Research and Development Authority (NYSERDA,) and by the federal Nuclear Regulatory Commission (NRC), successor to the Atomic Energy Commission. NYSERDA holds a license from the NRC, which has ultimate jurisdiction over high-level nuclear wastes.

Getty Oil took over the site in the 1970s and continued receiving nuclear fuel rods and dumping nuclear waste there until 1976 when, after numerous releases to the ground and atmosphere, public concern over contamination led the DEC to withdraw its permit for discharges into Buttermilk Creek. This, together with more stringent federal regulations and greater economic competition for nuclear waste disposal led NFS to shut the plant down, leaving New York State with the property. Although cleanup of some high-level nuclear wastes began in the 1990s and continues at what is now known as the West Valley Demonstration Project, regarding LLNW, the Nuclear Regulatory Commission has stated, "There is no intent to recover the wastes once they are buried."

== See also ==
- List of rivers of New York
