= John J. Aiken House =

Historic house in New York, United States

- U.S. National Register of Historic Places
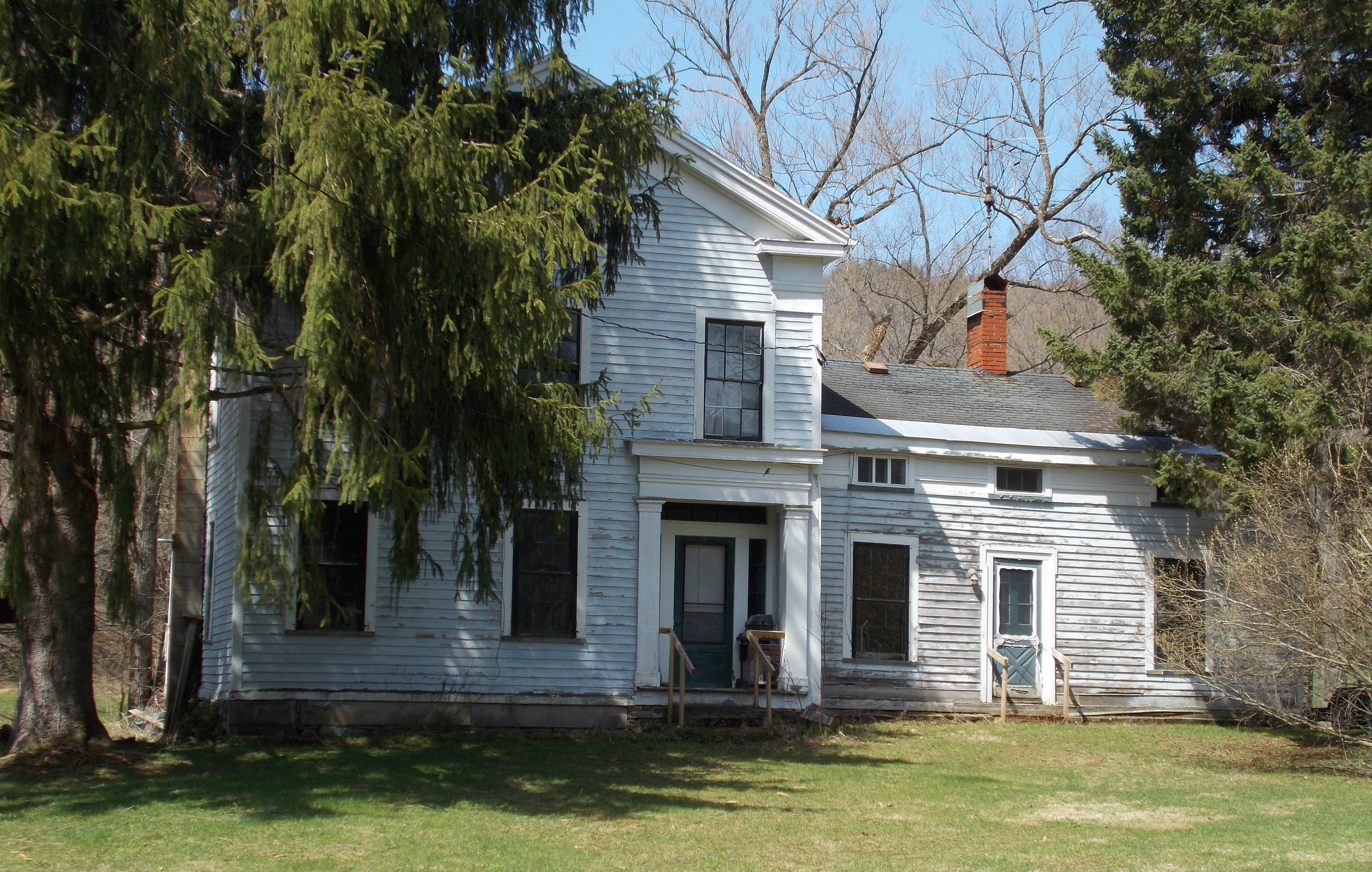
- John J. Aiken House, April 2013

- Location within New York Location within the United States
- Location: 6805 Poverty Hill Rd., Ellicottville, New York
- Coordinates: 43°09′51″N 78°41′16″W
- Area: 2.91 acres (1.18 ha)
- Built: c. 1837
- Architect: John J. Aiken
- Architectural style: Greek Revival
- Demolished: c. 2019
- NRHP reference No.: 13000025
- Added to NRHP: February 20, 2013

The John J. Aiken House (also known as the Aiken-Silvernail House) was a historic house located at 6805 Poverty Hill Road in Ellicottville, Cattaraugus County, New York.

== Description and history ==
It was built in about 1837, and is a two-story, "L"-plan, heavy timber-framed dwelling with modest Greek Revival style detailing. It is set on a stone foundation, has a front gable roof, and is sheathed in narrow clapboard sheathing. It was built by Rev John J. Aiken, Presbyterian minister and agent with the American Bible Society. It was listed on the National Register of Historic Places on February 20, 2013. The structure was demolished sometime prior to 2019.
