= Emor L. Calkins =

American temperance leader (1855–1933)

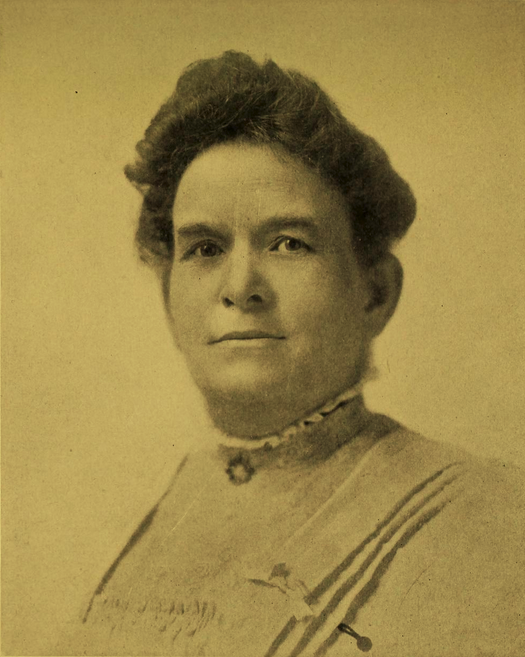
- Born: Emor Luthera Capron; October 3, 1853; Ashford, New York, U.S.
- Died: January 24, 1933 (aged 79); Ypsilanti, Michigan, U.S.
- Resting place: Kalamazoo, Michigan
- Education: Griffith's Institute
- Occupations: temperance leader and lecturer
- Organization: Woman's Christian Temperance Union
- Spouse: Earl Harrison Calkins (m. 1876; died 1901)
- Children: 3

Emor L. Calkins (née Capron; October 3, 1853 – January 24, 1933) was an American temperance leader and lecturer. After uniting with the Woman's Christian Temperance Union (WCTU), she served in several capacities including State vice-president of the Indiana WCTU, 1894; and State president of the Michigan WCTU, for 25 years, beginning in 1905.

== Early life and education ==
Emor Luthera Capron was born at Ashford, New York, (Note: According to American Commonwealth Company (1914), Emor was born in Springville, New York.) October 3, 1853. Her parents were Joseph and Mary (Frank) Capron. Emor had 11 siblings: George, Joseph, Henry, Julia, Almira, Charles, Manly, Flora, Alice, Matie, and Frank.

She was educated chiefly at Griffith's Institute, Springville, New York. At the age of 16, she began to teach alternate years, to defray the expense of education.

== Career ==
Calkins taught for some years in the public schools of New York.

In 1876, Miss Capron married Earl Harrison Calkins (1853-1901), of Golden, New York.

She joined the WCTU in 1880. In 1881, with their two daughters, the Calkins removed to South Bend, Indiana, where for several years, she taught elocution. She was also elected president of the WCTU's South Bend Central Union. Later, Calkins became, successively, superintendent of institutes, State organizer, and State vice-president. She also served as superintendent of Schools of Methods.

Calkins's public activities began in 1892, when she assisted Susan B. Anthony in the campaign to have the word "male" removed from the Constitution of the State of New York. In 1894, she removed to Kalamazoo, Michigan, serving as the WCTU's national organizer until 1905, when she was elected president of the Michigan WCTU. She retained that position for 25 years, and after her retirement from the active duties of that office, held the office of honorary president, continuing to lecture and do organization work. As national organizer for the WCTU, she became widely known; but her most efficient service was in her own State. When the Michigan division of the Woman's Council of Defense was organized, Calkins, whose home was at Ypsilanti, Michigan, was elected corresponding secretary.

Calkins was appointed by the president of the United States as one of a committee to represent the U.S. at an international sociological congress held in Germany and brought back a report covering much more than the deliberations of the convention, because of her individual conferences with many representatives and her intelligent observations in the countries visited.

== Personal life ==
Calkins had three children: Glena, Grace, and Mildred.

Emor L. Calkins died in Ypsilanti, Michigan, January 24, 1933; burial was in Kalamazoo.

Two WCTU unions in Michigan were named in Calkins' honor: one in Ypsilanti and another in Pontiac, Michigan.
