= Holiday Valley (ski resort) =

Family-oriented vacation spot and ski resort in Ellicottville, New York

Holiday Valley Resort
- Interactive map of Holiday Valley Resort
- Location: Ellicottville, New York, USA
- Nearest city: Buffalo
- Coordinates: 42°15′45″N 78°40′5″W
- Vertical: 750 feet (230 m)
- Top elevation: 2,250 feet (690 m)
- Base elevation: 1,500 feet (460 m)
- Skiable area: 290 acres (120 ha)
- Trails: 58 total
- Longest run: 1 mile (1.6 km)
- Lift system: 11 chairs, 2 surface lifts
- Terrain parks: 5
- Snowfall: 15 feet (4.6 m)
- Snowmaking: 95%
- Night skiing: 39
- Website: Holiday Valley

Holiday Valley Resort, known more commonly as just Holiday Valley, is a family-oriented vacation spot and ski resort in Ellicottville, New York. Established in 1957 by Nelson Pauly, John Fisher and Bill Northrup, the facility opened with four runs and one T-bar lift. Currently the resort contains 60 slopes and 13 lifts. Since its opening Holiday Valley has experienced steady growth and has become the main tourist attraction in Cattaraugus County. In 1995 the Inn at Holiday Valley opened, turning the slope into a self-contained ski resort.

== Geography ==
The resort is located on the north side of McCarty Hill, in the southern part of the town of Ellicottville, between the village and the town of Great Valley on U.S. Route 219. It is part of the ski country belt that runs through Western New York and is one of two ski resorts in the town of Ellicottville, the other being Holimont; unlike Holimont, which is mostly restricted to members only, Holiday Valley is open to the public. A third resort, the Concord Club on Poverty Hill, closed in 1991 and is currently being redeveloped into housing.

Holiday Valley also operates a tubing facility on a separate plot a few miles northeast of the ski resort.

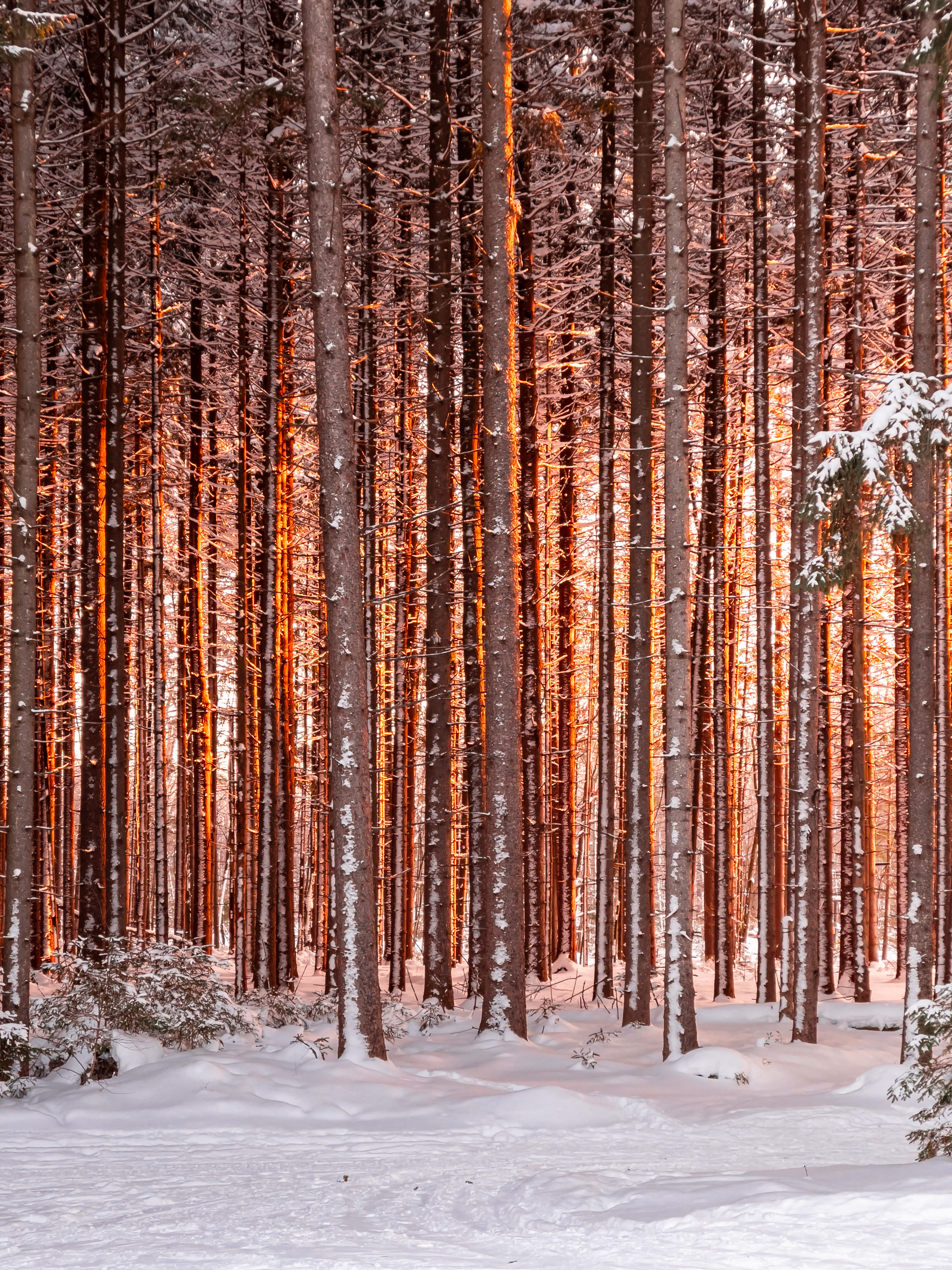
Sunset seen through forest at summit of Tannenbaum Run

The resort is 52 miles (84 km) south of the Canada–United States border at Buffalo; Canadians constitute approximately one third of Holiday Valley's business.

== Origin ==
After a search for initial investors, in 1956 Robert "Bob" Stubbs lead a group founders that included Dick Congdon, John Fisher, and Bill Northrup sold stock in a parking lot in Ellicottville for $100 per share to open a ski area. Under Stubb's guidance Holiday Valley was among the early supporters of the relatively new technology of snow making. The first four runs called Yodeler, Champagne, Holiday Run, and Edelweiss were cut in 1957, but due to mild weather early that winter their opening was delayed until January 7, 1958. Since then, Holiday Valley has added 52 runs including two terrain parks, 12 lifts, and a snow tubing hill.

== Lodges and Locations ==
As of 2021, there are 4 lodges. Here they are:

- Creekside Lodge. This lodge is located right by the Main Lodge, At the bottom of Creekside Lift. It features a small daycare and a seating area inside.
- Main Lodge. This is the core lodge at the valley. It features the lodge rooms, ski rentals, helmet rentals, the McCarthy Café, the Main Lodge Cafe, and pass rentals by it. The lodge is located near the bottom of Mardi Gras Lift.
- Tannenbaum Lodge. The Tannenbaum lodge is located about 1.2 miles (1.9 km) from U.S. Route 219 and the bottom of Tannenbaum and Spruce Lake Lifts. It features a kitchen, a resting spot, lockers, and more.
- Yodeler Lodge. The Yodeler Lodge is the original lodge at the valley. Opened in 1957, this lodge is located close to Tannenbaum Lodge and at the bottom of Yodeler Lift. The lodge features a kitchen, lockers, resting spaces, ski locks, etc

=== Other Locations ===
- Cindy’s Warming Hut. A small warming hut on the top of Cindy’s lift. In case visitors get cold, you can warm up at this warming hut.
- Mountain Top Warming Hut. Another hut identical to the one at Cindy’s. However, this one is on the top of Mardi Gras and Yodeler Lifts, and directly above Champagne.
- The Fort. A small playground and resting spot located amid the woods by Tannenbaum and Mistletoe.
- Waffle Cabin. A small eatery service at the top of Boardwalk Magic Carpet, and at the bottom of Mardi Gras, Slippery Streets and Cindy’s, which serves waffles and drinks..

== Ski mountain ==
The ski mountain is the flagship attraction at Holiday Valley. Today, the entire mountain holds 60 slopes and 13 ski lifts. Despite its relatively small size, the resort has experienced consistent growth since opening in 1958. Two hotels, the Inn at Holiday Valley and the Tamarack Club opened in which both hold condominiums and hotel rooms. Per USGS Topographic Map MRC 42078C6, Holiday Valley lies at the foot of McCarty Hill with a peak elevation of 2,323 ft (708 m) and a base below 1,600 ft (490 m), giving Holiday Valley a "vertical drop" over 750 ft (230 m).

Due to the fluctuating climate in the area during the winter in the early and late season, the resort relies heavily on snowmaking technology. As of 2011, Holiday Valley uses a completely automated snowmaking system. This system automatically controls the amount and temperature of water it sprays, which snow machines on the mountains are running, and when they turn on and shut off. The system can also adjust these variables based on the outside temperature. According to the snowmaking team, the software in this new system allows them to turn the snow machines on with their cell phones.

=== Trails ===
Easier	More Difficult	Most Difficult	Most Difficult (Use Extreme Caution)
Bear Cub	Ballet	Champagne	The Wall
Boardwalk	Bobsled	Chute	The Wall Bottom
Candy Cane	Cathedral	Cross Cut	The Wall Top
Catwalk	CCC	Devils Glen	
Cross Country Walking Trail	Cindy's Run	Eagle	Terrain Parks
Days End	Crystal Bottom	Edelweiss	42/78
Explorer	Crystal Top	Ego Alley	Moonshadow
Fiddlers Elbow	Firelane	Ego Glade	Progression Park
Frostline	Independence	Falcon	Rail Fun Park
Holiday Run	Last Chance	Firecracker East	Snoozer
Laurel	Mardi Gras	Firecracker West	
Northwind Top	Mistletoe	Foxfire	Cross Country
Punch Bowl	Morning Star	Gobbler Glade	Cross Country
Raccoon Run	Northwind Bottom	Happy Glade	Happy Wanderer Walking Trail
School Haus East	Reindeer	Hoot Owl	XC Golf Course
School Haus West	Stewardess Cut	Maple Leaf	
Slippery Streets	Sunrise	Moonshadow	
Snowbird	Upper Woodstock	Pipeline	
Snowledge		Raven	
Spruce Line		Shadows	
Sugar Plum		Snoozer	
Tannenbaum		Swiss Twist	
Woodpecker		Yodeler	
Woodstock Lower			

=== Lifts ===
Lift	Lift Type	No. Chairs	Lift length	Night Skiing
Boardwalk	Magic Carpet	N/A	TBA	Yes
Chute	Fixed Grip Quad	TBA	1,800 ft (550 m)	No
Cindy’s	Fixed Grip Quad	80	2,200 ft (670 m)	Yes
Creekside	Fixed Grip Quad	36	875 ft (267 m)	Yes
Eagle	Fixed Grip Quad	72	N/A	No
Mardi Gras	High Speed Six	94	4,400 ft (1,300 m)	Yes
Morning Star	High Speed Quad	56	2,580 ft (790 m)	Yes
Slippery Streets	Magic Carpet	N/A	TBA	Yes
SnowPine	Fixed Grip Quad	TBA	2,100 ft (640 m)	No
Spruce Lake	Fixed Grip Quad	100	2,900 ft (880 m)	No
Sunrise	Fixed Grip Quad	77	N/A	Yes
Tannenbaum	High Speed Quad	58	N/A	Yes
Yodeler	High Speed Quad	46	2,000 ft (610 m)	Yes

== Recognition ==
In the past decade the resort has received positive recognition within the ski community. According to Buffalo Business First, “Holiday Valley has been in the [Ski Magazine’s] Top Ten poll for Eastern resorts for the past six years” prior to 2009.”

Ski Magazine's 2020 Resort Rankings placed Holiday Valley tenth best in the East and second in New York State, calling it a "...small, great Eastern ski operation." At one point in the 2000s, Holiday Valley ranked third in the East, surpassing Whiteface Mountain’s ski offerings.

== Non-winter events and attractions ==
- Double Black Diamond Golf Course - The Double Black Diamond Golf Course at Holiday Valley is an 18-hole course which bends around the base of the ski mountain. The first nine holes were added to the area in 1962 to attract golfers during the spring, summer and fall. In 1987, the second nine holes opened making it a full course. The course opens near the end of April and closes for the winter at the end of October; the exact dates vary with each year due to uncertain weather patterns in the area during changing seasons.
- Sky High Adventure Park - Completed in 2011, this is Holiday Valley’s most recently added attraction for the skiing off-season. It includes a high ropes course and a coaster ride which glides one to two passenger cars on a 2,490 ft (760 m) descent down the mountain.
- Summer Festival - The surrounding town of Ellicottville holds an annual festival, called Summer Festival of the Arts, which is partially sponsored by the Holiday Valley resort. This festival hosts various concerts and art displays in the first weekend of July.
- Fall Festival - The Holiday Valley resort and local Tamarack Club host a festival simply called “Fall Festival” each year in the first weekend of October. This event features a 5k foot race, a mountain bike race, chair lift rides, shopping, food, and other activities in celebration of the changing leaves and the coming winter season.
- Sky Flyer Mountain Coaster - Open year round, the coaster is a single track fixed course with riders on sleds fixed to the rail.
