= Ashford, New York =

- Town
- Location within New York Location within the United States
- Coordinates: 42°26′47″N 78°39′10″W
- Country: United States
- State: New York
- County: Cattaraugus

Government
  - Type: Town Council
  - Town Supervisor: John A Pfeffer (R)
  - Town Council: Members' List: • Angela Ghani (R); • James Boberg (R); • Jean Bond (D); • William J. Heim (R)

Area
  - Total: 51.40 sq mi (133.13 km^{2})
  - Land: 51.24 sq mi (132.71 km^{2})
  - Water: 0.17 sq mi (0.43 km^{2})
- Elevation: 1,381 ft (421 m)

Population (2020)
  - Total: 1,974 ▼
  - Estimate (2021): 1,956
  - Density: 40.6/sq mi (15.66/km^{2})
- Time zone: UTC-5 (Eastern (EST))
  - Summer (DST): UTC-4 (EDT)
- ZIP Codes: 14171 (West Valley); 14101 (Machias); 14141 (Springville)
- FIPS code: 36-009-02759
- GNIS feature ID: 0978690
- Website: www.ashfordny.gov

Ashford is a town in Cattaraugus County, New York, United States. The population was 1,974 at the 2020 census. The town is on the county's northern border.

== History ==
The town was first settled circa 1816, and was founded in 1824 from Ellicottville by Henry Frank Sr., a Revolutionary War veteran from Philadelphia.

== Geography ==
According to the United States Census Bureau, the town has a total area of 51.9 square miles (134.4 km^{2}), of which 51.7 square miles (134.0 km^{2}) is land and 0.15 square miles (0.4 km^{2}), or 0.32%, is water.

The north boundary is formed by Cattaraugus Creek, and the north town line is the border of Erie County.

New York State Route 240, a north-south route in the eastern part of the town, links the town to the suburbs of Buffalo, as does U.S. Route 219 in the western part of the town.

=== Adjacent towns and areas ===
The northern border is formed with the towns of Concord and Sardinia in Erie County, and the south border is created by the towns of Ellicottville and East Otto. To the west is the town of East Otto. The east boundary is formed by the towns of Machias and Yorkshire.

== Demographics ==
Historical population
Census	Pop.	Note	%±
1830	631		—
1840	1,469		132.8%
1850	1,658		12.9%
1860	1,975		19.1%
1870	1,801		−8.8%
1880	1,813		0.7%
1890	1,710		−5.7%
1900	1,645		−3.8%
1910	1,557		−5.3%
1920	1,379		−11.4%
1930	1,214		−12.0%
1940	1,340		10.4%
1950	1,370		2.2%
1960	1,490		8.8%
1970	1,577		5.8%
1980	1,922		21.9%
1990	2,162		12.5%
2000	2,223		2.8%
2010	2,132		−4.1%
2020	1,974		−7.4%
2021 (est.)	1,956		−0.9%
U.S. Decennial Census

As of the census of 2000, there were 2,223 people, 857 households, and 634 families residing in the town. The population density was 43.3 inhabitants per square mile (16.7/km^{2}). There were 1,023 housing units at an average density of 19.9 per square mile (7.7/km^{2}). The racial makeup of the town was 96.99% White, 1.53% African American, 0.54% Native American, 0.18% Asian, 0.09% from other races, and 0.67% from two or more races. Hispanic or Latino of any race were 0.76% of the population.

There were 857 households, out of which 33.6% had children under the age of 18 living with them, 61.7% were married couples living together, 8.3% had a female householder with no husband present, and 26.0% were non-families. 21.5% of all households were made up of individuals, and 7.6% had someone living alone who was 65 years of age or older. The average household size was 2.59 and the average family size was 3.03.

In the town, the population was spread out, with 26.8% under the age of 18, 5.7% from 18 to 24, 28.7% from 25 to 44, 27.1% from 45 to 64, and 11.7% who were 65 years of age or older. The median age was 38 years. For every 100 females, there were 98.3 males. For every 100 females age 18 and over, there were 98.5 males.

The median income for a household in the town was $41,313, and the median income for a family was $44,509. Males had a median income of $32,392 versus $21,500 for females. The per capita income for the town was $19,136. About 4.0% of families and 6.3% of the population were below the poverty line, including 5.9% of those under age 18 and 6.5% of those age 65 or over.

== Communities and locations in Ashford ==
- Ashford Hollow – A hamlet in the southwest part of the town on U.S. Route 219.
- Beaver Siding – A location in the southeast corner of the town, located on County Road 60 and south of West Valley.
- Bellow Corners – A hamlet east of Ashford Hollow, located on County Road 85.
- Buttermilk Creek – A tributary of Cattaraugus Creek in the north part of the town.
- Edies Siding – A hamlet in the northwest corner of the town by Cattaraugus Creek.
- Fox – A hamlet near the center of the town, east of Ashford Hollow.
- Riceville (also called "East Ashford") – A hamlet near the east town line on County Road 55.
- Riceville Station – A location west of Riceville on Route 240.
- Scoby Power Plant and Dam – A former hydroelectric dam along Cattaraugus Creek on the northern border of the town.
- Thomas Corners – A hamlet in the northeast part of the town on Route 240.
- West Valley – A hamlet and census-designated place in the southeast part of the town at the junction of Routes 53 and 240.
- West Valley Demonstration Project – A United States Department of Energy nuclear processing station.

== Notable people ==
- Emor L. Calkins (1853-1933), temperance leader
