= Scoby Power Plant and Dam =

Power station in Erie County, New York

- U.S. National Register of Historic Places
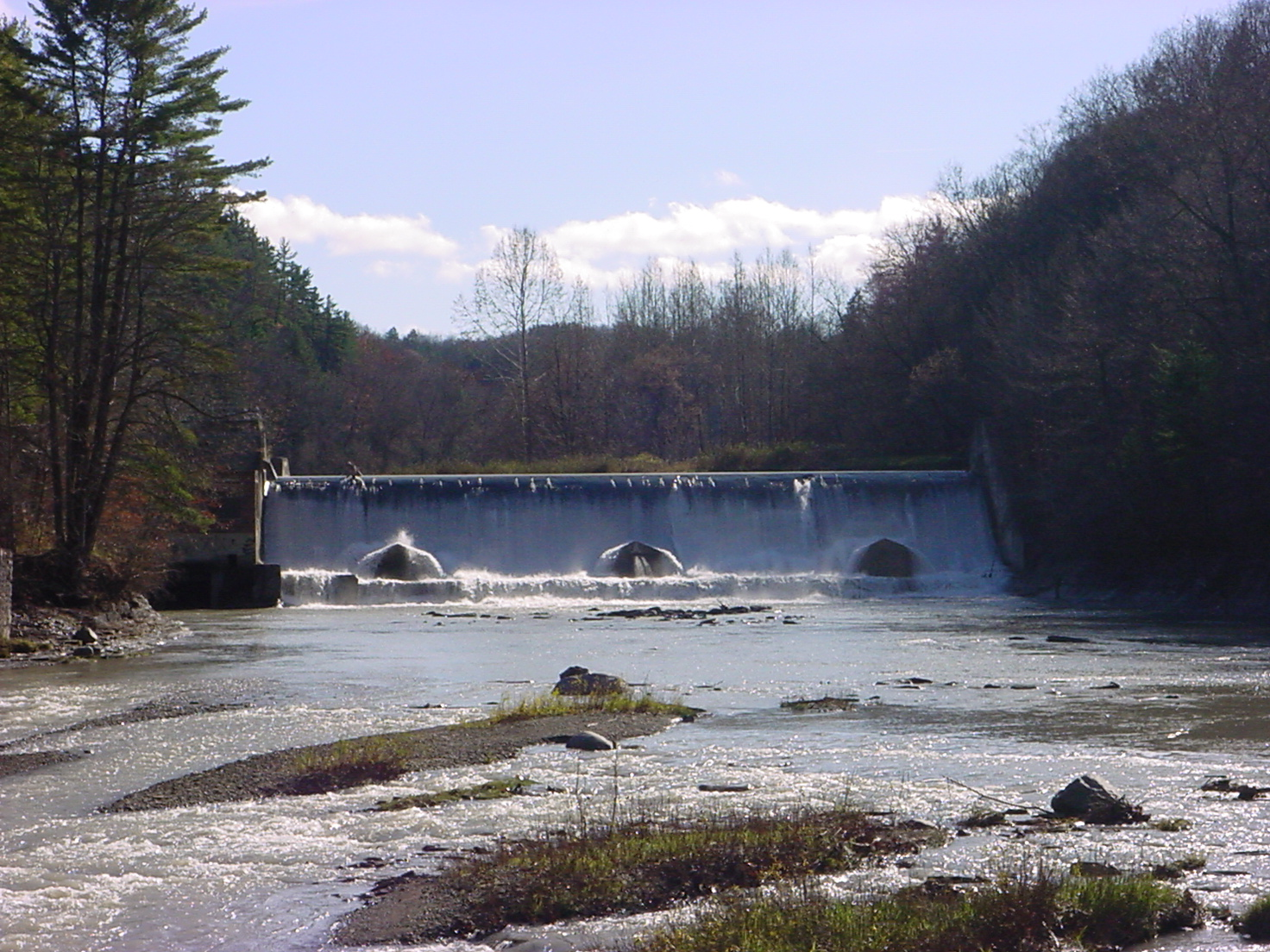
- Scoby Power Plant and Dam, November 2009

- Location within New York Location within the United States
- Location: Towns of Ashford / Concord, New York, USA
- Nearest city: Springville, New York
- Coordinates: 42°28′42″N 78°41′56″W
- Built: 1925
- Architect: Brass Bros.
- Architectural style: Power Plant and Dam
- NRHP reference No.: 96000296
- Added to NRHP: September 20, 1996

Scoby Power Plant and Dam is a historic dam and now defunct power plant located between the towns of Ashford and Concord, near Springville, New York. The complex is located on the eastern bank of Cattaraugus Creek outside Springville. It is representative of a small hydroelectric generating facility of the early 20th century in Western New York. The complex was constructed in 1925, replacing a facility near this site.

It was listed on the National Register of Historic Places in 1996.

== Scoby Dam Park ==
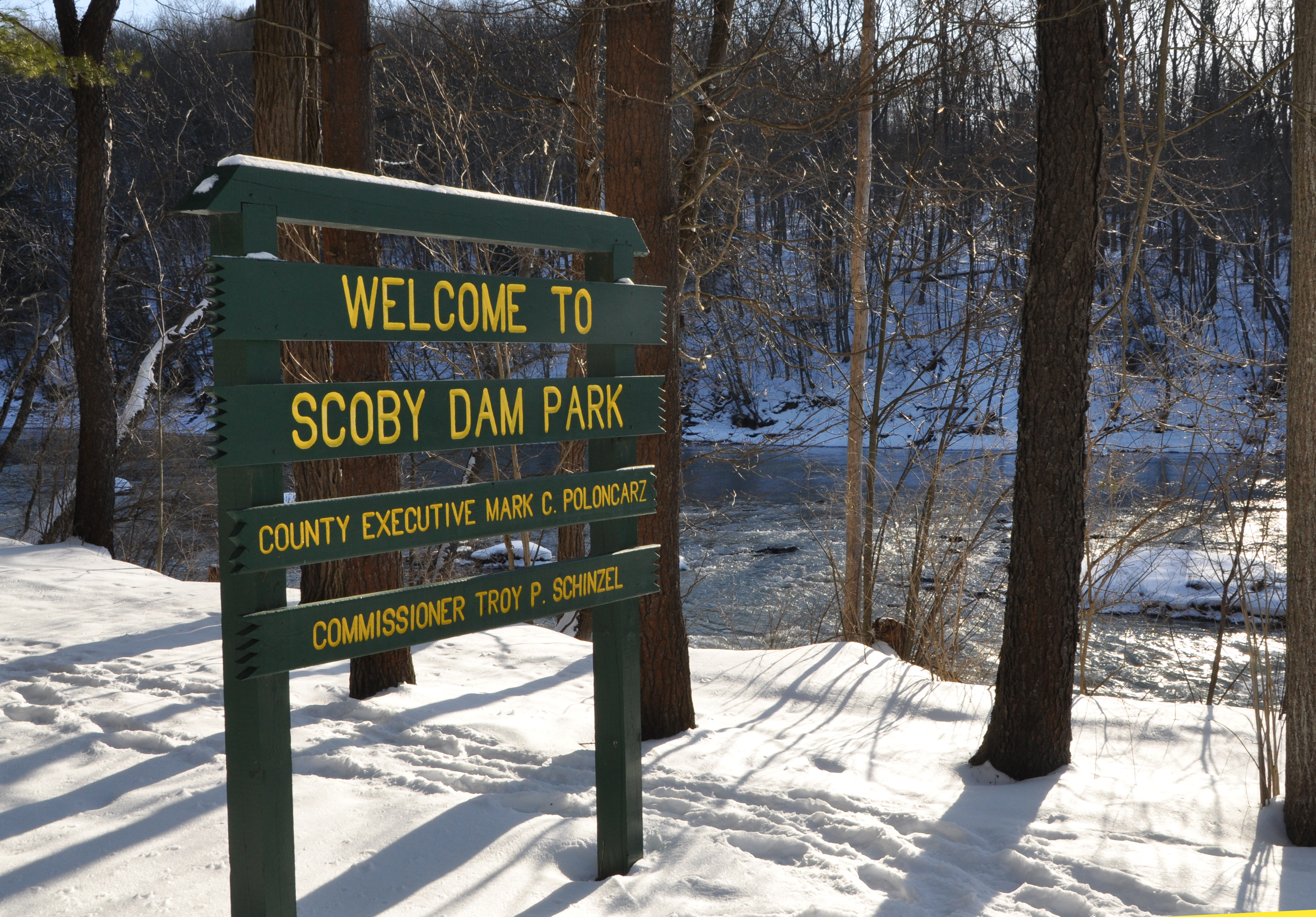
Sign at the entrance of Scoby Dam Park.

The Erie County Department of Parks, Recreation and Forestry acquired the dam and surrounding property shortly after the Village of Springville ceased using the dam for power generation in 1998. The park is managed as a "conservation park" with minimal improvements and facilities.

The park is popular with anglers seeking steelhead during the fall, winter and spring, and also includes space for picnicking and hiking. In 2014, local residents began petitioning for state and local support to install the "Springville Whitewater Park" at the site, which would include dedicated access and space for whitewater rafting activities.

== Proposed dam lowering ==
Concerns over the dam's structural integrity and the desire to remove a barrier to stream-running steelhead has led to a proposal to lower the currently-38-foot (12 m) Scoby Dam by about 30 feet (9.1 m). The $6.6 million (USD) proposal was put forth by the U.S. Army Corps of Engineers in 2014, and if approved the work could happen within three years of the proposal's passage.

In addition to lowering the dam, a 15-foot (4.6 m) fish ladder would also be installed to allow migratory fish to access an additional 44 miles (71 km) of Cattaraugus Creek and its tributaries above the dam. By allowing steelhead access beyond the dam, anglers would be able to seek these fish by utilizing an additional 34 miles (55 km) of public stream access. Currently, only four miles (6.4 km) of the stream below the dam is publicly accessible for fishing.

Appropriate habitats for steelhead spawning exist above the dam, and its removal could allow for steelhead populations to become more self-sustaining. Currently, the steelhead fishery is maintained primarily through annual stocking of fish, however up to 25% of the creek's steelhead may be the result of natural reproduction.

Critics of the project have raised concerns about impacts on resident brown and rainbow trout populations above the dam, and the possibility of introducing invasive species such as the sea lamprey into stretches of the creek currently free of such organisms. The USACE proposal includes barriers that are intended to restrict the movement of sea lamprey beyond the dam. As of 2024 no progress has been made in the dam remains fully intact.
