= West Valley Demonstration Project =

Nuclear waste remediation site outside Buffalo, NY

Coordinates: 42°27′2″N 78°39′17″W

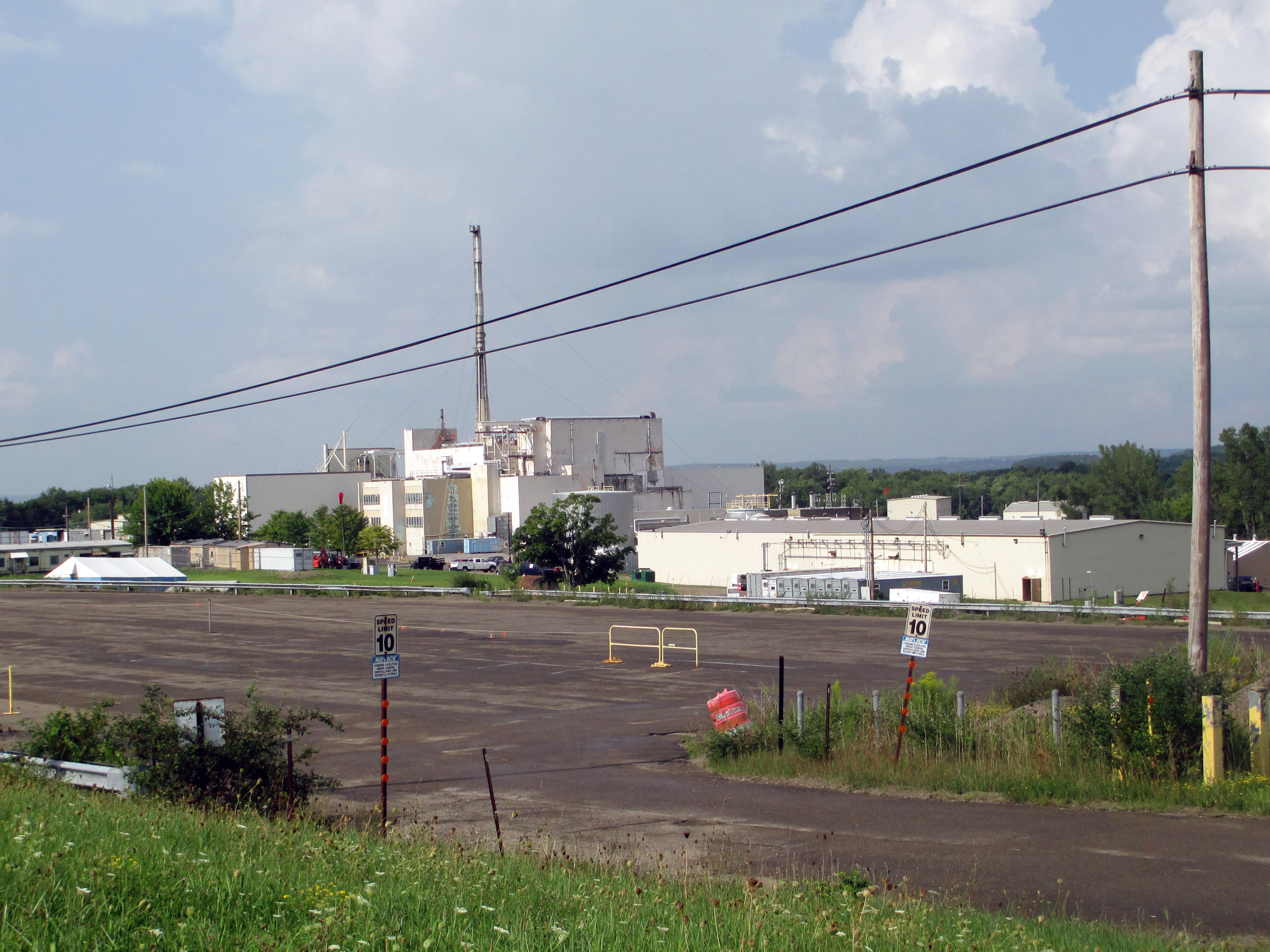
The West Valley Demonstration Project core processing facility, viewed from Rock Springs Road, in August 2016.

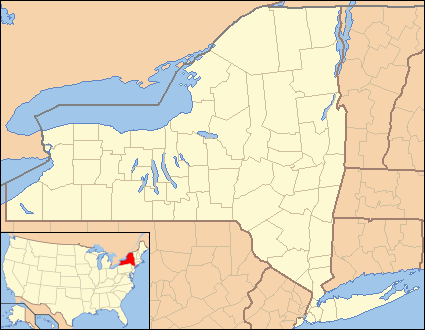
Location of the West Valley Demonstration Project in New York State.

The West Valley Demonstration Project is a nuclear waste remediation site in West Valley, New York in the U.S. state of New York. The project focuses on the cleanup and containment of radioactive waste left behind after the abandonment of a commercial nuclear fuel reprocessing plant in 1980. The project was created by an Act of Congress in 1980 and is directed to be a cooperative effort between the United States Department of Energy and the New York State Energy Research and Development Authority.

Despite over 30 years of cleanup efforts and billions of dollars having been spent at the site, the West Valley Demonstration Project property was described as "arguably Western New York's most toxic location" in 2013.

== History ==
=== 1965 to 1980: Commercial operations by Nuclear Fuel Services, Inc. ===
The State of New York acquired 3,345 acres (13.54 km^{2}) of land in the Town of Ashford, near West Valley, in 1961 with the intention of developing an atomic industrial area. The property was named the Western New York Nuclear Service Center and would eventually host a commercial spent nuclear fuel reprocessing plant and low-level radioactive waste disposal site that was operated by Nuclear Fuel Services, Inc.

Nuclear Fuel Services was a subsidiary of the W.R. Grace Company in 1963, when the Atomic Energy Commission granted the company the necessary permits to reprocess spent fuel at the West Valley site. The first shipments of spent fuel arrived at the site in 1965, and reprocessing began the next year. In 1969, Nuclear Fuel Services was acquired by Getty Oil.

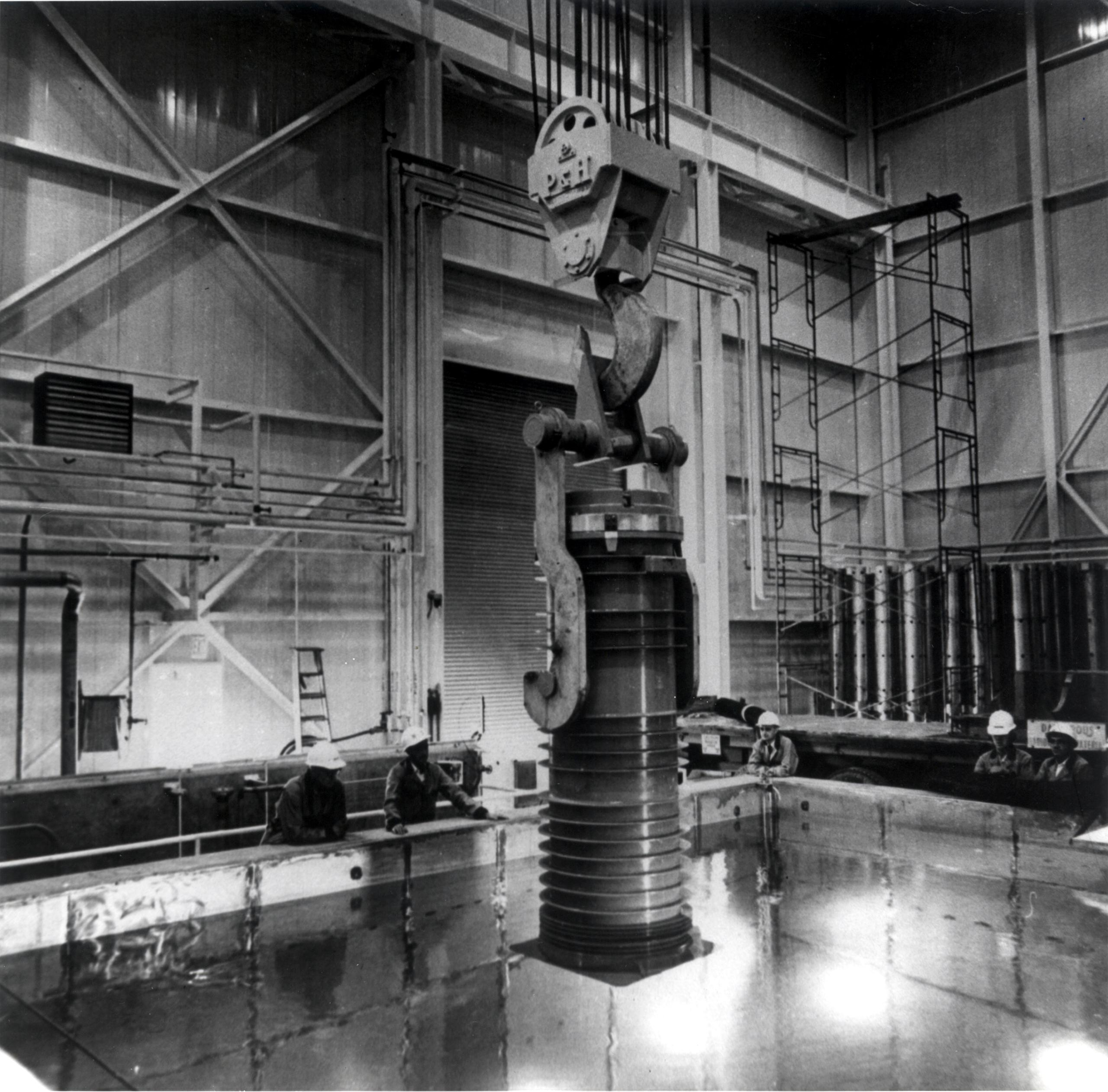
A 23-ton cask containing a single fuel element is lowered into the unloading pool at Nuclear Fuel Services' West Valley reprocessing plant circa 1966.

The plant reprocessed spent reactor fuel at the site from 1966 to 1972. During this time period, the facility processed 1,983.7 kilograms (4,373 lb) of plutonium and 625.7 metric tons (1,379,000 lb) of spent uranium. Using the PUREX process, the plant was able to recover 1,926 kilograms (4,246 lb) of plutonium and 620 metric tons (1,370,000 lb) of uranium. Most of the recovered uranium was depleted or slightly enriched; only 0.9 metric tons (2,000 lb) was highly enriched.

The reprocessing of fuel also resulted in the accumulation of 660,000 US gallons (2,500 m^{3}) of high-level radioactive waste in an underground storage tank. An additional 15 acres (0.061 km^{2}) of the property was licensed by New York State for burial of low-level radioactive waste in 20-foot (6.1 m) deep trenches. After reprocessing operations ceased in 1972, Nuclear Fuel Services continued to accept low-level radioactive waste for disposal at the site until it was discovered that contaminated water was leaking from the trenches. Nuclear Fuel Services was unable to obtain regulatory approval to remove and treat the contaminated water, and stopped accepting waste for burial in 1975. In total, approximately 2,400,000 cubic feet (68,000 m^{3}) of low-level waste was buried at the site.

Escalating regulation required plant modifications which were deemed uneconomic by Nuclear Fuel Services, who ceased all operations at the facility in 1976. After Nuclear Fuel Services' lease expired in 1980, the site and its accumulated waste became the responsibility of New York State.

The former plant remains the only privately owned nuclear fuel reprocessing center to have ever operated in the United States. Two additional private nuclear fuel reprocessing plants were constructed (one by General Electric in Morris, Illinois, and another by Allied General Nuclear Services in Barnwell, South Carolina), but were never permitted to operate. Other reprocessing plants in the United States have been operated by the U.S. Department of Energy rather than private companies.

=== 1980 to present: U.S. Department of Energy's West Valley Demonstration Project ===
The West Valley Demonstration Project Act (Public Law 96-368) was passed by the United States Congress in 1980, and directed the United States Department of Energy to lead the task of solidifying and removing the accumulated nuclear waste present on the site, in addition to decontaminating and decommissioning the facility and surrounding property. The processes used to solidify and contain the site's nuclear waste were intended to demonstrate strategies that could be used at other cleanup sites.

On October 1, 1980, the U.S. Department of Energy entered into a cooperative agreement with the New York State Energy Research and Development Authority to determine an operational framework for cleanup activities at the site. The agreement specified that the USDOE would take the lead on the project and obtain exclusive control over the site's 175-acre (0.71 km^{2}) high-security core area, while NYSERDA would represent New York State's interests in the project and manage the remainder of the site's property. It also stipulated that the U.S. Federal Government would pay for 90% of the project's costs, with New York State paying the remainder.

Site operations began in February 1982, after West Valley Nuclear Services Company, Inc. (then a subsidiary of Westinghouse Electric Corporation) was chosen by the USDOE as the primary contractor for work to be done at the West Valley Demonstration Project.

== See also ==
- Nuclear fuel
- Nuclear fuel cycle
- Sellafield
- COGEMA La Hague site
