= West Valley, New York =

- Hamlet & CDP
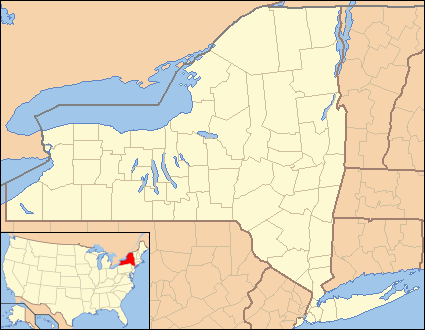
- Location within the state of New York
- Coordinates: 42°24′10″N 078°36′36″W
- Country: United States
- State: New York
- County: Cattaraugus County
- Town: Ashford

Area
  - Total: 1.53 sq mi (3.97 km^{2})
  - Land: 1.53 sq mi (3.97 km^{2})
  - Water: 0.0039 sq mi (0.01 km^{2})
- Elevation: 1,522 ft (464 m)

Population (2020)
  - Total: 452
  - Density: 295.0/sq mi (113.91/km^{2})
- Time zone: UTC-5 (Eastern (EST))
  - Summer (DST): UTC-4 (EDT)
- ZIP code: 14171
- Area code: 716
- FIPS code: 36-81138
- GNIS feature ID: 970885
- Website: www.ashfordny.org

West Valley is a hamlet in the Town of Ashford in Cattaraugus County, New York, United States. As of the 2020 census, West Valley had a population of 452. The community is listed as a census-designated place.

Located at the intersection of Cattaraugus County Route 53 and State Route 240/County Route 32, the hamlet is home to West Valley Central School and the West Valley Demonstration Project, a nuclear cleanup facility. Because of the presence of a school district, a telephone exchange (716–942), and a post office located in (and named after) the hamlet, many people mistake West Valley to be the name of an actual town or village. However, it does not have any autonomous government separate from the town of Ashford.

== Geography ==
West Valley is located at 42°24′10″N 078°36′36″W (42.4028410, −78.6100253) and its elevation is 1,522 feet (464 m).

According to the 2010 United States census, the CDP has a total area of 1.535 square miles (3.98 km^{2}), of which 1.532 square miles (3.97 km^{2}) is land and 0.003 square miles (0.01 km^{2}) is water.

== Demographics ==
Historical population
Census	Pop.	Note	%±
2020	452		—
U.S. Decennial Census
