= National Register of Historic Places listings in Allegany County, New York =

Location of Allegany County in New York

This is intended to be a complete list of properties and districts listed on the National Register of Historic Places in Allegany County, New York. The locations of National Register properties and districts for which the latitude and longitude coordinates are included below, may be seen in a map.

This National Park Service list is complete through NPS recent listings posted February 6, 2026.

Contents: Counties in New York
Albany (Albany) – Allegany – Bronx – Broome – Cattaraugus – Cayuga – Chautauqua – Chemung – Chenango – Clinton – Columbia – Cortland – Delaware – Dutchess (Poughkeepsie, Rhinebeck) – Erie (Buffalo) – Essex – Franklin – Fulton – Genesee – Greene – Hamilton – Herkimer – Jefferson – Kings – Lewis – Livingston – Madison – Monroe (Rochester) – Montgomery – Nassau – New York (Below 14th Street, 14th to 59th Streets, 59th to 110th Streets, Above 110th Street, Islands) – Niagara (Niagara Falls) – Oneida – Onondaga (Syracuse) – Ontario – Orange – Orleans – Oswego – Otsego – Putnam – Queens – Rensselaer – Richmond – Rockland – St. Lawrence – Saratoga – Schenectady – Schoharie – Schuyler – Seneca – Steuben – Suffolk – Sullivan – Tioga – Tompkins – Ulster – Warren – Washington – Wayne – Westchester (Northern, Southern, New Rochelle, Peekskill, Yonkers) – Wyoming – Yates

== Current listings ==
	Name on the Register	Image	Date listed	Location	City or town	Description
1	Alfred Village Historic District	Alfred Village Historic District	September 11, 1985 (#85002323)	Sections of N. & S. Main, Church, Ford, Glenn, Park, Sayles, Terrace & W. University Sts. 42°15′13″N 77°47′19″W	Alfred	
2	Alumni Hall	Alumni Hall	September 12, 1985 (#85002389)	Alfred University; 42°15′11″N 77°47′16″W	Alfred	
3	Angelica Park Circle Historic District	Angelica Park Circle Historic District	January 31, 1978 (#78001840)	Main and White Sts. and Allegany County Fairgrounds; 42°18′21″N 78°00′56″W	Angelica	
4	Belmont Grange No. 1243	Belmont Grange No. 1243	January 18, 2006 (#05001533)	32 Willets Ave. 42°13′30″N 78°02′25″W	Belmont	
5	Belmont Hotel	Belmont Hotel	December 3, 2001 (#01001319)	40-48 Schuyler St. 42°13′24″N 78°02′00″W	Belmont	
6	Belmont Literary and Historical Society Free Library	Belmont Literary and Historical Society Free Library	July 5, 2003 (#03000599)	2 Willets Ave. 42°13′24″N 78°02′09″W	Belmont	
7	Belvidere	Belvidere	March 16, 1972 (#72000822)	3 mi. N of Belmont on SR 408; 42°15′54″N 78°01′50″W	Angelica	
8	Bolivar Free Library		July 5, 2003 (#03000606)	390 Main Street; 42°03′55″N 78°03′44″W	Bolivar	
9	Canaseraga Four Corners Historic District	Canaseraga Four Corners Historic District	March 6, 2002 (#02000145)	42-64 and 43-69 Main St., 9 S. Church St. 42°27′41″N 77°46′39″W	Canaseraga	
10	Caneadea Bridge	Caneadea Bridge	November 19, 1998 (#98001388)	Cty. Rd. over Genesee R. 42°23′06″N 78°08′59″W	Caneadea	
11	Centerville Town Hall	Centerville Town Hall	March 25, 2009 (#09000154)	Fairview Road; 42°28′44″N 78°14′58″W	Centerville	
12	Ceres School		December 7, 2010 (#10000991)	School St. 41°59′58″N 78°16′22″W	Ceres	
13	Christ Episcopal Church		May 17, 1974 (#74001218)	Gibson Hill Rd., SW of Rtes. 19 and 408; 42°15′10″N 78°04′31″W	Belvidere	Now known as Belvidere Cornerstone
14	Cuba Cemetery		February 12, 2015 (#15000004)	Medbury Ave. opposite Union St. 42°13′18″N 78°16′10″W	Cuba	1841 rural cemetery merged with adjacent Catholic cemetery in 1923 has graves of many early town residents
15	Fireman's Hall	Fireman's Hall	March 18, 1980 (#80004275)	7 W. University St. 42°15′13″N 77°47′29″W	Alfred	
16	Friendship Free Library	Friendship Free Library	August 15, 2008 (#08000769)	40 West Main Street; 42°12′25″N 78°08′07″W	Friendship	
17	The Little Genesee Schoolhouse-Genesee District No. 1 School		January 30, 2025 (#100011343)	8351 State Route 417; 42°01′27″N 78°12′37″W	Little Genesee	
18	Main Street Historic District	Main Street Historic District	February 5, 1999 (#99000087)	Roughly along Main St., from Orchard St. to Green St. 42°13′01″N 78°16′33″W	Cuba	
19	McKinney Stables of Empire City Farms	McKinney Stables of Empire City Farms	August 12, 1999 (#99001000)	105 South St. 42°12′35″N 78°16′16″W	Cuba	
20	Old Allegany County Courthouse	Old Allegany County Courthouse	August 21, 1972 (#72000821)	Park Circle; 42°18′19″N 78°00′58″W	Angelica	
21	The Pink House		March 3, 2021 (#100006214)	193 West State St. 42°07′02″N 77°57′03″W	Wellsville	
22	Rail and Titsworth Canal Warehouse	Rail and Titsworth Canal Warehouse	August 16, 2000 (#00000987)	Hughes Rd. 42°20′33″N 78°07′33″W	Belfast	
23	The Reynolds House	The Reynolds House	February 14, 2022 (#100007412)	56 West University St. 42°15′12″N 77°47′43″W	Alfred	
24	South Street Historic District	South Street Historic District	May 26, 1988 (#88000585)	17, 19-89 South St. 42°12′50″N 78°16′31″W	Cuba	
25	Allen Steinheim Museum	Allen Steinheim Museum	June 4, 1973 (#73001163)	Alfred University Campus; 42°15′16″N 77°47′13″W	Alfred	
26	Terra Cotta Building	Terra Cotta Building	March 16, 1972 (#72000820)	Main St. 42°15′27″N 77°47′19″W	Alfred	
27	US Post Office-Wellsville	US Post Office-Wellsville	May 11, 1989 (#88002445)	40 E. Pearl St. 42°07′24″N 77°56′56″W	Wellsville	
28	Moses Van Campen House	Moses Van Campen House	April 16, 2004 (#04000287)	4690 Birdsall Rd. 42°18′07″N 77°59′55″W	Angelica	
29	The Village of Wellsville East Historic District		January 30, 2025 (#100011345)	Roughly Bounded by Genesee Pkwy; Bolivar Rd.; Coats St.; Johnson St.; E. Genesee St.; O'Connor St.; Scott Ave.; Wheeler Place; Windover E. &W.; and E. Dyke St. 42°07′31″N 77°57′12″W	Wellsville	
30	Wellman House		June 20, 1974 (#74001219)	Main St. 42°12′22″N 78°08′13″W	Friendship	
31	Wellsville Erie Depot	Wellsville Erie Depot	August 27, 1987 (#87001426)	Depot St. 42°07′24″N 77°56′54″W	Wellsville	
32	West Almond Churches		August 2, 2000 (#00000876)	Cty. Rte. 2; 42°17′59″N 77°53′07″W	West Almond	
