= Alumni Hall =

Alumni Hall may refer to:

- Alumni Hall (DePaul University), on the DePaul University campus
- Alumni Hall (Fairfield University), on the Fairfield University campus
- Alumni Hall (Iowa State University), on the Iowa State University campus, listed on the NRHP in Iowa
- Alumni Hall (Miami University), in Oxford, Ohio
- Alumni Hall (Navy), on the US Naval Academy campus
- Alumni Hall (Alfred, New York), listed on the NRHP in New York
- Alumni Hall (University of New England), on the University of New England campus
- Alumni Hall (University of Notre Dame), a residence hall at the University of Notre Dame
- Alumni Hall (University of Pittsburgh), on the University of Pittsburgh campus
- Alumni Hall (Providence), on the Providence College campus
- Alumni Hall (Vanderbilt University), Nashville, Tennessee
- Carnesecca Arena at St. John's University, New York City, formerly called Alumni Hall
- Alumni Hall (Ohio Dominican University), a basketball arena; see Ohio Dominican Panthers

== See also ==
- Alumnae Hall (Western College for Women), Oxford, Ohio, USA
- Alumni Arena (disambiguation)
- Alumni Field (disambiguation)
- Alumni Gym (disambiguation)
- Alumni House (disambiguation)
- Alumni Stadium (disambiguation)
