= Alumni Arena =

Alumni Arena may refer to:

- Alumni Arena (Armstrong State University), arena on the campus of Armstrong State University, Georgia
- Alumni Arena (SUNY Cortland), ice arena on the campus of SUNY Cortland, New York
- Broadview Arena, arena on the campus of the University at Buffalo, New York formerly known as Alumni Arena

== See also ==
- Alumni Field (disambiguation)
- Alumni Gym (disambiguation)
- Alumni Hall (disambiguation)
- Alumni House (disambiguation)
- Alumni Stadium (disambiguation)
