= Alumni House =

Alumni House may refer to:

- Alumni House (College of William & Mary)
- Alumni House (University of Southern Mississippi), a Mississippi Landmark; see List of Mississippi Landmarks
- Alumni House (United States Naval Academy)
- Widney Alumni House, original building of the University of Southern California

== See also ==
- Alumni Arena (disambiguation)
- Alumni Field (disambiguation)
- Alumni Gym (disambiguation)
- Alumni Hall (disambiguation)
- Alumni Stadium (disambiguation)
