= Alumni Gym =

Alumni Gym may refer to:

- Alumni Gym (Loyola University Chicago) in Chicago, Illinois
- Alumni Gym (Elon University) in Elon, North Carolina
- Alumni Gymnasium (Dartmouth College) in Hanover, New Hampshire
- Alumni Gymnasium (Davidson College) in Davidson, North Carolina
- Alumni Gymnasium (Drake University) in Des Moines, Iowa
- Alumni Gymnasium (Rider University) in Lawrenceville, New Jersey
- Alumni Gymnasium (University of Kentucky) in Lexington, Kentucky, now officially known as Alumni Gym Fitness Center
- Alumni Gymnasium (WPI) in Worcester, Massachusetts

== See also ==
- Alumni Arena (disambiguation)
- Alumni Field (disambiguation)
- Alumni Hall (disambiguation)
- Alumni House (disambiguation)
- Alumni Stadium (disambiguation)
