= Genesee, New York =

- Town
- Location within New York Location within the United States
- Coordinates: 42°3′17″N 78°15′32″W
- Country: United States
- State: New York
- County: Allegany

Government
  - Type: Town Council
  - Town Supervisor: Donald Jordan (D)
  - Town Council: Members' List: • Alyn Holcomb; • Colleen Estabrook; • Ed Miller; • Jodi Adams

Area
  - Total: 36.29 sq mi (93.99 km^{2})
  - Land: 36.24 sq mi (93.87 km^{2})
  - Water: 0.050 sq mi (0.13 km^{2})
- Elevation: 1,906 ft (581 m)

Population (2020)
  - Total: 1,653 ▼
  - Estimate (2021): 1,635
  - Density: 45.0/sq mi (17.38/km^{2})
- Time zone: UTC-5 (Eastern (EST))
  - Summer (DST): UTC-4 (EDT)
- ZIP Codes: 14721 (Ceres); 14754 (Little Genesee); 14770 (Portville); 14715 (Bolivar); 14727 (Cuba)
- FIPS code: 36-003-28563
- GNIS feature ID: 0978989
- Website: townofgeneseeny.gov/public/

Genesee is a town in Allegany County, New York, United States. The population was 1,653 at the 2020 census. Genesee is in the southwestern corner of the county, southeast of Olean.

== History ==
The first settler arrived circa 1823. The town of Genesee was established in 1830 from a division of the town of Cuba.

Much of the early economy was based on harvesting the forests, but oil production began in approximately 1890.

== Geography ==
According to the United States Census Bureau, the town has a total area of 36.3 square miles (94.0 km^{2}), of which 36.3 square miles (93.9 km^{2}) is land and 0.039 square miles (0.1 km^{2}), or 0.13%, is water.

The south town line is the Pennsylvania (McKean County) border, and the west town line is shared with the town of Portville in Cattaraugus County.

New York State Route 417 is an important east-west highway through the town.

== Demographics ==
Historical population
| Census | Pop. | Note | %± |
|---|---|---|---|
| 1830 | 219 | | — |
| 1840 | 578 | | 163.9% |
| 1850 | 672 | | 16.3% |
| 1860 | 963 | | 43.3% |
| 1870 | 888 | | −7.8% |
| 1880 | 974 | | 9.7% |
| 1890 | 1,076 | | 10.5% |
| 1900 | 1,052 | | −2.2% |
| 1910 | 1,105 | | 5.0% |
| 1920 | 911 | | −17.6% |
| 1930 | 1,119 | | 22.8% |
| 1940 | 1,188 | | 6.2% |
| 1950 | 1,134 | | −4.5% |
| 1960 | 1,193 | | 5.2% |
| 1970 | 1,187 | | −0.5% |
| 1980 | 1,787 | | 50.5% |
| 1990 | 1,672 | | −6.4% |
| 2000 | 1,803 | | 7.8% |
| 2010 | 1,693 | | −6.1% |
| 2020 | 1,653 | | −2.4% |
| 2021 (est.) | 1,635 | | −1.1% |
U.S. Decennial Census

As of the census of 2000, there were 1,803 people, 661 households, and 493 families residing in the town. The population density was 49.7 inhabitants per square mile (19.2/km^{2}). There were 800 housing units at an average density of 22.0 per square mile (8.5/km^{2}). The racial makeup of the town was 99.11% White, 0.06% African American, 0.11% Native American, 0.33% from other races, and 0.39% from two or more races. Hispanic or Latino of any race were 1.22% of the population.

There were 661 households, out of which 38.6% had children under the age of 18 living with them, 61.9% were married couples living together, 7.1% had a female householder with no husband present, and 25.4% were non-families. 19.7% of all households were made up of individuals, and 7.7% had someone living alone who was 65 years of age or older. The average household size was 2.73 and the average family size was 3.12.

In the town, the population was spread out, with 28.8% under the age of 18, 7.7% from 18 to 24, 29.6% from 25 to 44, 23.8% from 45 to 64, and 10.1% who were 65 years of age or older. The median age was 36 years. For every 100 females, there were 101.7 males. For every 100 females age 18 and over, there were 103.5 males.

The median income for a household in the town was $38,563, and the median income for a family was $44,100. Males had a median income of $31,047 versus $22,557 for females. The per capita income for the town was $16,169. About 8.9% of families and 11.8% of the population were below the poverty line, including 13.7% of those under age 18 and 5.4% of those age 65 or over.

== Communities and locations in Genesee ==
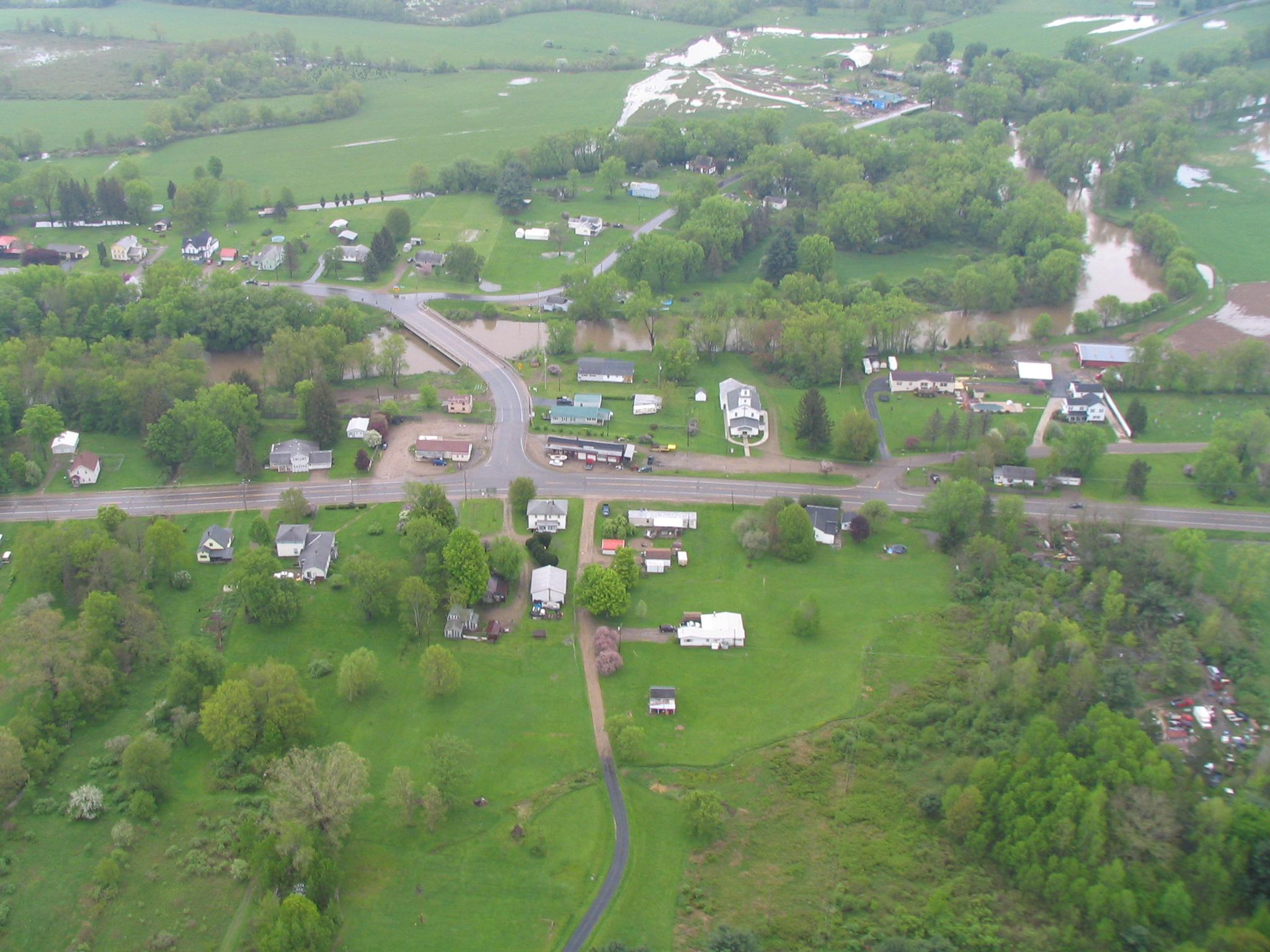
Ceres, Pennsylvania (top), south of Oswayo Creek, Ceres, New York (bottom) north of the creek

- Bowler – A location by Route 417 and the south town line.
- Little Genesee – A hamlet on Route 417 in the eastern part of the town.
- Little Genesee Creek – A stream in the southeast part of the town.
- Ceres – A hamlet on Route 417 at the Oswayo Creek near the Pennsylvania border, so part of the community is in that state. The Ceres School was listed on the National Register of Historic Places in 2010.
- Obi – A location in the northwest part of the town by Route 305.
- Sanford – A location on Route 417 in southwest of Little Genesee.
