= Alumni Stadium (disambiguation) =

Alumni Stadium is a stadium in Chestnut Hill, Massachusetts, United States

Other stadiums with similar names include:

- Alumni Coliseum (Butte), Butte, Montana
- Alumni Stadium (BJU), Greenville, South Carolina
- Alumni Stadium (Delaware State), Dover, Delaware
- Alumni Stadium (Fairfield), Fairfield, Connecticut
- Alumni Stadium (Guelph), Guelph, Ontario, Canada
- Alumni Stadium (Kean University), Union, New Jersey
- Alumni Stadium (Maine), Orono, Maine
- Alumni Stadium (Notre Dame), Notre Dame, Indiana
- Alumni Stadium (WPI), Worcester, Massachusetts
- Alumni Memorial Stadium (Livingstone), Salisbury, North Carolina
- Abbott Memorial Alumni Stadium, Tuskegee, Alabama
- Albert J. Sloan–Alumni Stadium, Fairfield, Alabama
- Coughlin–Alumni Stadium, Brookings, South Dakota
- Warren McGuirk Alumni Stadium, Amherst, Massachusetts
- Western Alumni Stadium, London, Ontario, Canada

== See also ==
- Alumni Soccer Stadium (disambiguation)
- Alumni Arena (disambiguation)
- Alumni Field (disambiguation)
- Alumni Gym (disambiguation)
- Alumni Hall (disambiguation)
- Alumni House (disambiguation)
