= Alumni Soccer Stadium =

Alumni Soccer Stadium may refer to:

- Alumni Soccer Stadium (Davidson), soccer stadium for Davidson College in Davidson, North Carolina
- Alumni Stadium (Notre Dame), soccer stadium at the University of Notre Dame in Notre Dame, Indiana

== See also ==
- Alumni Stadium (disambiguation)
