= Alumni Field =

Alumni Field may refer to:

== Sports facilities ==
=== Canada ===
- Alumni Field (York University), in Toronto, Ontario
- University of Windsor Stadium, also known as Alumni Field, Windsor, Ontario

=== United States ===
Listed alphabetically by state

- Alumni Field (Colorado School of Mines), in Golden, Colorado
- MacKenzie Alumni Field, at Western Illinois University in Macomb, Illinois
- Alumni Field (Kentucky State), in Frankfort, Kentucky
- Pat Kenelly Diamond at Alumni Field, at Southeastern Louisiana University in Hammond, Louisiana
- Alfond Sports Stadium, formerly known as Alumni Field, at the University of Maine in Orono, Maine
- Alumni Field (MD) (University of Maryland, Baltimore County), formerly known as The Baseball Factory Field at UMBC in Catonsville, Maryland
- Alumni Field (Amherst, Massachusetts), a former sports location at the University of Massachusetts in Amherst, Massachusetts
- Alumni Field (Boston College), home to Boston College football before Alumni Stadium, in Chestnut Hill, Massachusetts
- Stoklosa Alumni Field, in Lowell, Massachusetts
- Alumni Field at Carol Hutchins Stadium, at the University of Michigan in Ann Arbor, Michigan
- Alumni Field (Keene), in New Hampshire
- Alumni Field (Wright State), in Dayton, Ohio
- Alumni Field (VMI), original football field at the Virginia Military Institute in Lexington, Virginia
- Alumni Memorial Field, current football field at the Virginia Military Institute in Lexington, Virginia

== See also ==
- Alumni Stadium (disambiguation)
- Alumni Arena (disambiguation)
- Alumni Gym (disambiguation)
- Alumni Hall (disambiguation)
- Alumni House (disambiguation)
