= Ezra Kendall =

American dramatist

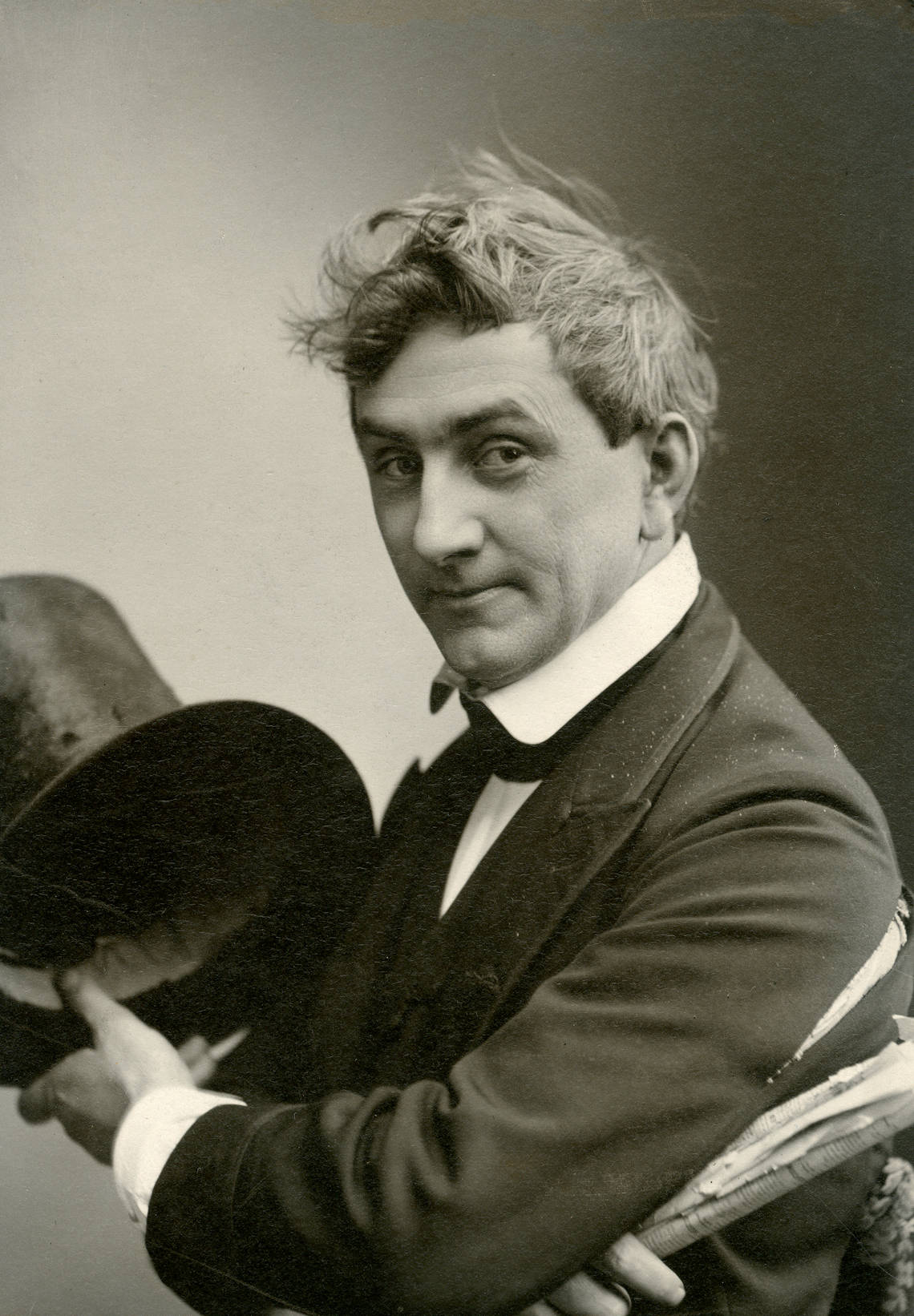
- Born: Ezra Freemont Kendall; February 15, 1861 near Centerville, New York
- Died: January 23, 1910 (aged 48); Martinsville, Indiana
- Occupations: Actor-Comedian, Humorist, Playwright and Author

Ezra Freemont Kendall (February 15, 1861 – January 23, 1910) was an American actor-comedian, humorist, playwright and author who was known for his depiction of typical New England Yankees. During his time in vaudeville Kendall was said to have been among the highest paid monologist in America.

== Early life ==
Ezra Freemont Kendall was born on a farm near Centerville, New York, to Ezra W. and Eliza R. (née Pratt) Kendall. The September following his birth, Kendall's father enlisted as a sergeant with Company D, 64th Infantry Regiment, New York and soon rose to lieutenant before losing his life during the Battle of Seven Pines.

Kendall left school at fourteen to work as a printer's assistant. At seventeen he traveled to New York City where he became a cub reporter on several newspapers and the youngest member of the New York Press Club. By nineteen or twenty he was touring with a theatre company playing walk-on rôles for free board and laundry service. Later Kendall replaced the troupe's property man at $4 a-week before making his professional stage debut as an English butler in Elliott Barnes' melodrama, Only a Farmer's Daughter.

== Career ==
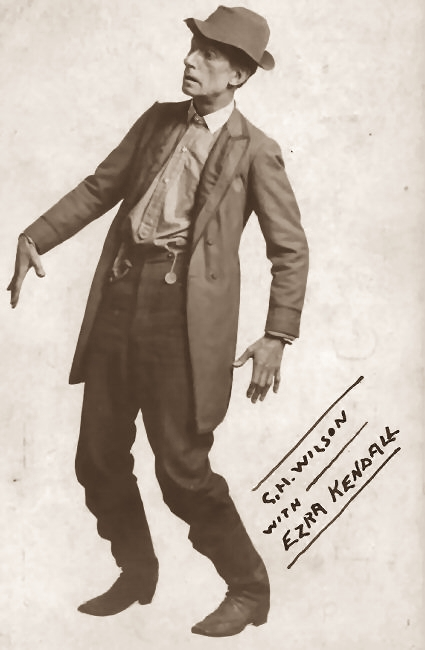
Kendall in character

He later toured in Lillian Cleves' Grump, Elliott Barnes' Dr. Clyde, Wallack and Hinds' Criterion -Comedy Company and Edward ("Teddy") Byron's, Summer Boarders. Around 1882 Kendall organized a minstrel company with Horace Johnson, which lasted a short period, and next partnered with comedian Alfred Klein, in an act that collapsed after one week. Kendall later starred in the original Muggs' Landing and in early 1884 scored a hit in Wanted, a Partner with a run that lasted until late spring. Over the summer of 1884 he worked as an advance agent for a minstrel show before beginning the 1884–1885 season performing with William A. Mestayer's company in A Box of Matches.

On September 19, 1884, Kendall opened in We, Us & Company, a musical farce he wrote that would bring him to national attention. After a successful yearlong tour Kendall sold the rights to We, Us & Company to Mestayer and then proceeded to organize his own company. His most successful production during this period was probably A Pair of Kids, that toured for at least six seasons over the late 1880s and early 1890s. Around 1894 he wrote and then toured in The Substitute with the diminutive comedian Arthur Dunn and his sister, soubrette Jennie Dunn, and appeared in David Henderson's extravaganza Ali Baba, during its run of one hundred nights at the Chicago Opera House. Kendall would find success beginning in 1896 as a monologist on the vaudeville circuit before returning the legitimate stage in 1902 with his play The Vinegar Buyer and later, Edward E. Kidder's Weather-beaten Benson and road adaptations of George Ade's Bad Samaritan and Land of Dollars.

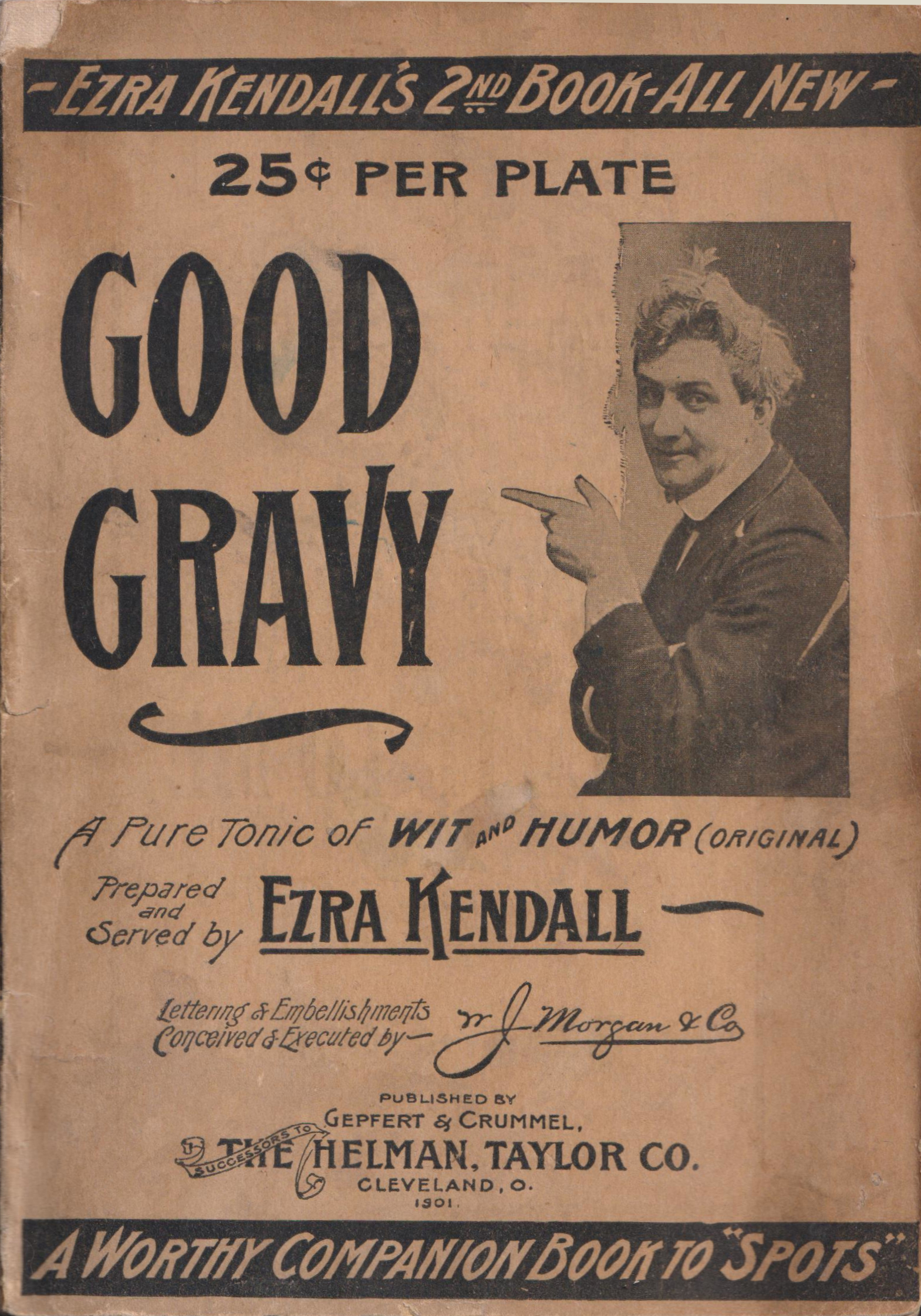
Kendall's book Good Gravy

The Vinegar Buyer, Kendall's most successful play over the last decade of his career, was also released as a book. Kendall would author late in his career a number of humorous books that included Spots of Wit and Humor (1899), Good Gravy (1901), Tell It to Me (1903), Hot Ashes (1908) and Top Soil (1909). The first three books were later published as a hard cover collection by the Cleveland News Company.

The text of the books is reproduced from handwriting, and accompanied by line drawings of people and objects from the stories being told. The stories contain frequent wordplay and clearly portray the rhythm and comic timing of vaudeville players.

The following is an example of the style of short humorous stories in Kendall's books:

Coming from my home to the city one day on a local train a lady came into th' car where I was. —

She was followed by six children.
Th' conductor says: —
"Excuse me, Madam, is this your family or a picnic." —
She says: —"This is my family and it's no picnic." —
Then she stacked them all up on th' seat in front of me.
She put th' larger one on th' bottom of th' bunch. —

And when th' conductor came back she told him that the oldest one was under five.

== Death ==
Kendall suffered a stroke in mid-December 1909 while touring in Los Angeles with The Vinegar Buyer. He was forced to cancel his remaining tour dates and return to his home in Cleveland, Ohio. A month or so later he traveled to Indiana for a stay at the Martinsville Mineral Springs Hotel (also known as Martinsville Sanitarium) in the hope their mineral baths could help alleviate his condition. He died there a few days later. Kendall was survived by his wife of twenty-two years, the aforementioned Jennie Dunn, and six children. That December Kendall's widow was sued by his former management firm, Liebler and Co., who were attempting to recoup money lost after he became ill and failed to complete his tour. It is not known here whether or not this lawsuit was settled before Liebler fell into bankruptcy four years later.

== Plays ==
- Weather Beaten Benson
