= Amity, Allegany County, New York =

Amity, New York
- Town
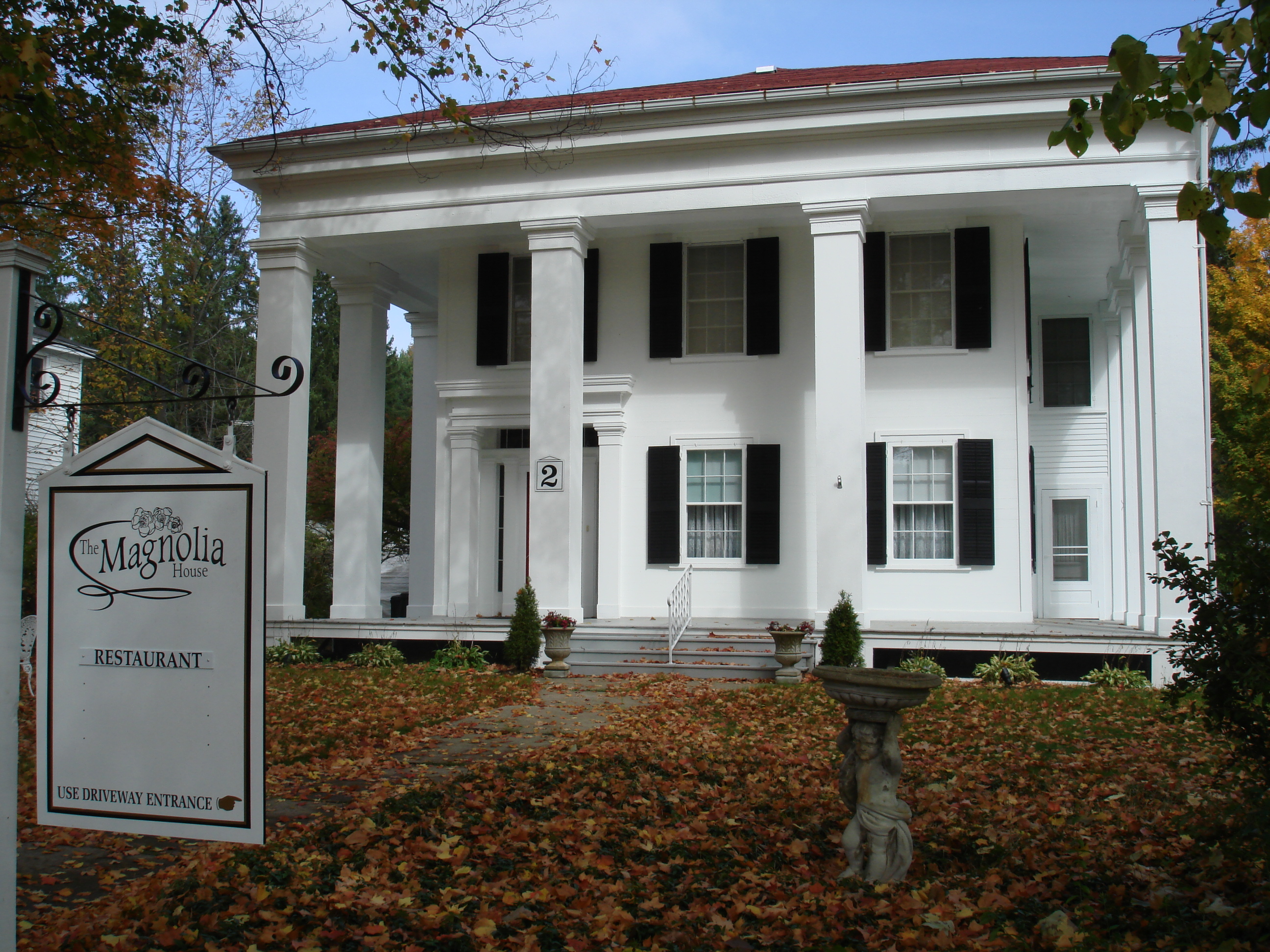
- The Magnolia House

- Location within the state of New York
- Coordinates: 42°13′37″N 78°1′55″W
- Country: United States
- State: New York
- County: Allegany

Government
  - Type: Town Council
  - Town Supervisor: Lois Reynolds (R)
  - Town Council: Members' List: • John Francisco (R); • Mark Presutti (R); • Brian Clendenin (R); • Jeff Zenoski (R)

Area
  - Total: 34.60 sq mi (89.62 km^{2})
  - Land: 34.48 sq mi (89.31 km^{2})
  - Water: 0.12 sq mi (0.32 km^{2})
- Elevation: 1,385 ft (422 m)

Population (2020)
  - Total: 2,185 ▼
  - Estimate (2021): 2,161
  - Density: 63/sq mi (24.5/km^{2})
- Time zone: UTC-5 (Eastern (EST))
  - Summer (DST): UTC-4 (EDT)
- ZIP Codes: 14813 (Belmont); 14739 (Friendship); 14880 (Scio)
- FIPS code: 36-003-02011
- GNIS feature ID: 0978676
- Website: townofamityny.gov

Amity is a town in Allegany County, New York, United States. The population was 2,185 at the 2020 census. The name of the town means "friendship."

The Town of Amity is near the middle of Allegany County and is northeast of Olean. The county seat, Belmont, is in Amity.

== History ==
After being first settled circa 1804, Amity was formed in 1830 from parts of the Towns of Angelica and Scio. In 1856, part of Amity was used to found the Town of Ward.

== Notable person ==
- Hamilton Ward, Sr., congressman and judge

== Geography ==
According to the United States Census Bureau, the town has a total area of 34.6 square miles (90 km^{2}), of which 34.5 square miles (89 km^{2}) is land and 0.1 square miles (0.26 km^{2}) (0.23%) is water.

The Genesee River flows northward through the town. The Southern Tier Expressway (New York State Route 17/Interstate 86) passes through the northwest corner of the town, north of Belvidere. New York State Route 19 and New York State Route 244 intersect at Belmont.

== Demographics ==
Historical population
Census	Pop.	Note	%±
1830	872		—
1840	1,354		55.3%
1850	1,792		32.3%
1860	2,268		26.6%
1870	2,087		−8.0%
1880	1,972		−5.5%
1890	1,996		1.2%
1900	2,216		11.0%
1910	2,071		−6.5%
1920	1,843		−11.0%
1930	1,867		1.3%
1940	1,935		3.6%
1950	1,997		3.2%
1960	2,006		0.5%
1970	2,150		7.2%
1980	2,272		5.7%
1990	2,255		−0.7%
2000	2,245		−0.4%
2010	2,308		2.8%
2020	2,185		−5.3%
2021 (est.)	2,161		−1.1%
U.S. Decennial Census

As of the census of 2000, there were 2,245 people, 885 households, and 601 families residing in the town. The population density was 65.0 inhabitants per square mile (25.1/km^{2}). There were 1,120 housing units at an average density of 32.4 per square mile (12.5/km^{2}). The racial makeup of the town was 97.68% White, 0.76% African American, 0.04% Native American, 0.09% Asian, 0.09% from other races, and 1.34% from two or more races. Hispanic or Latino of any race were 0.76% of the population.

There were 885 households, out of which 30.6% had children under the age of 18 living with them, 52.5% were married couples living together, 11.3% had a female householder with no husband present, and 32.0% were non-families. 26.6% of all households were made up of individuals, and 12.8% had someone living alone who was 65 years of age or older. The average household size was 2.48 and the average family size was 2.98.

In the town, the population was spread out, with 25.6% under the age of 18, 7.3% from 18 to 24, 26.5% from 25 to 44, 24.1% from 45 to 64, and 16.4% who were 65 years of age or older. The median age was 39 years. For every 100 females, there were 100.6 males. For every 100 females age 18 and over, there were 95.8 males.

The median income for a household in the town was $34,153, and the median income for a family was $40,387. Males had a median income of $31,394 versus $21,065 for females. The per capita income for the town was $15,304. About 7.8% of families and 11.6% of the population were below the poverty line, including 15.3% of those under age 18 and 4.2% of those age 65 or over.

== Communities and locations in the Town of Amity ==
- Amity Lake – A small lake by the eastern town line.
- Belmont – The Village of Belmont, the county seat, is in the center of the town.
- Belvidere – A hamlet in the northwest part of the town on State Route 19 (Willets Avenue). It was originally called "Hobbyville." The Belvidere Cornerstone, formerly known as Christ Episcopal Church, was listed on the National Register of Historic Places in 1974.
- Withey – A hamlet in the northeast corner of the town on Route 244 (Mainville Road).
- Plum Bottom Creek– A creek that flows through the Town of Amity.
