= Centerville Town Hall =

- U.S. National Register of Historic Places
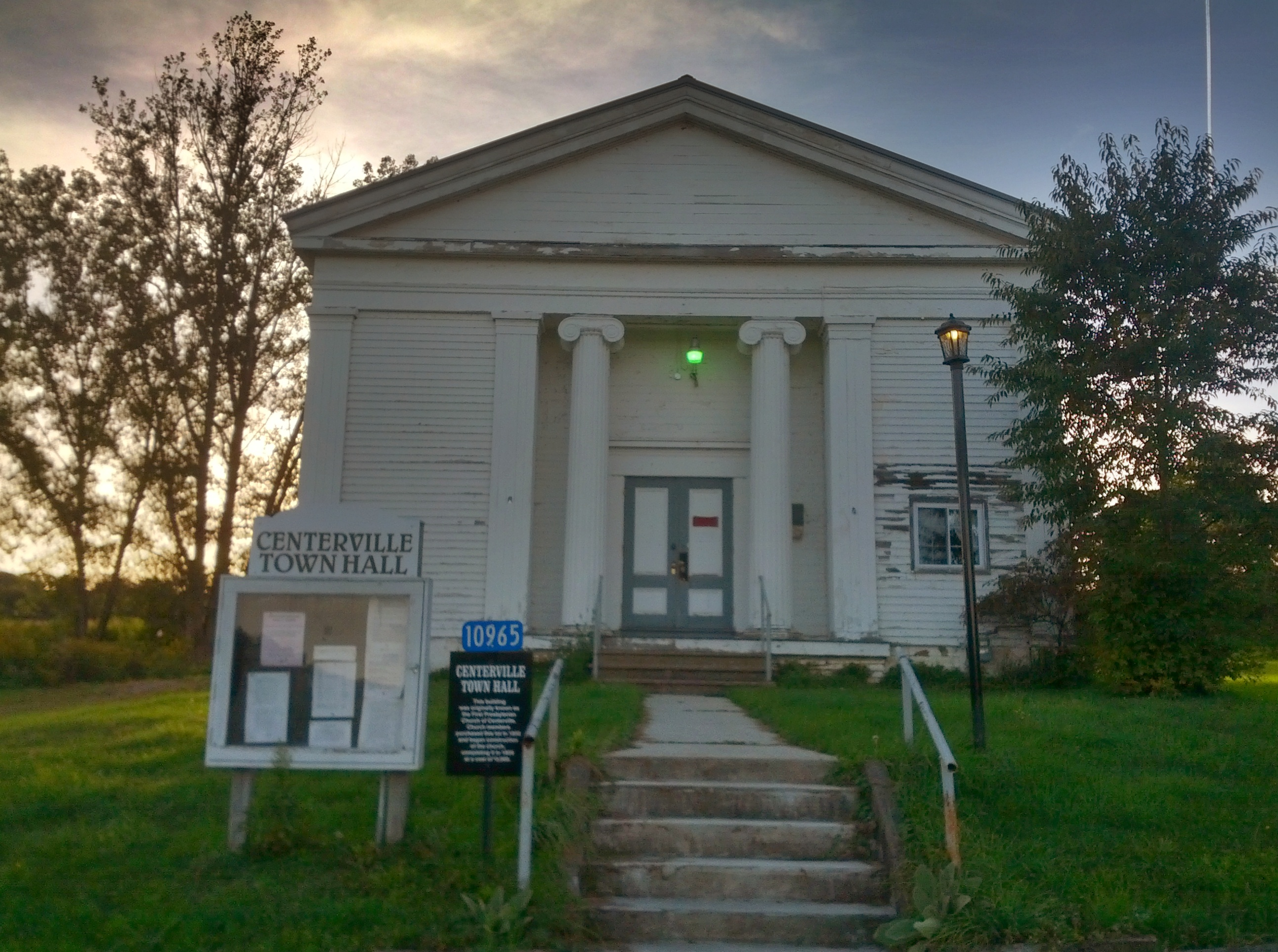
- Centerville Town Hall, September 2012

- Location within New York Location within the United States
- Location: Fairview Road, Centerville, New York
- Coordinates: 42°28′44.36″N 78°14′58.34″W
- Area: 0.5 acres (0.20 ha)
- Built: 1859
- Architectural style: Greek Revival
- NRHP reference No.: 09000154
- Added to NRHP: March 25, 2009

Centerville Town Hall is a historic town hall located at Centerville in Allegany County, New York. It was completed in 1859 and is a 2-story, three-by-three-bay Greek Revival style former Presbyterian church building. It has a large, 1-story horse / carriage house wing at the rear. The building was used as a Grange hall from 1909 to 1927, after which it became the town hall.

It was listed on the National Register of Historic Places in 2009.
