= Fireman's Hall (Alfred, New York) =

- U.S. National Register of Historic Places
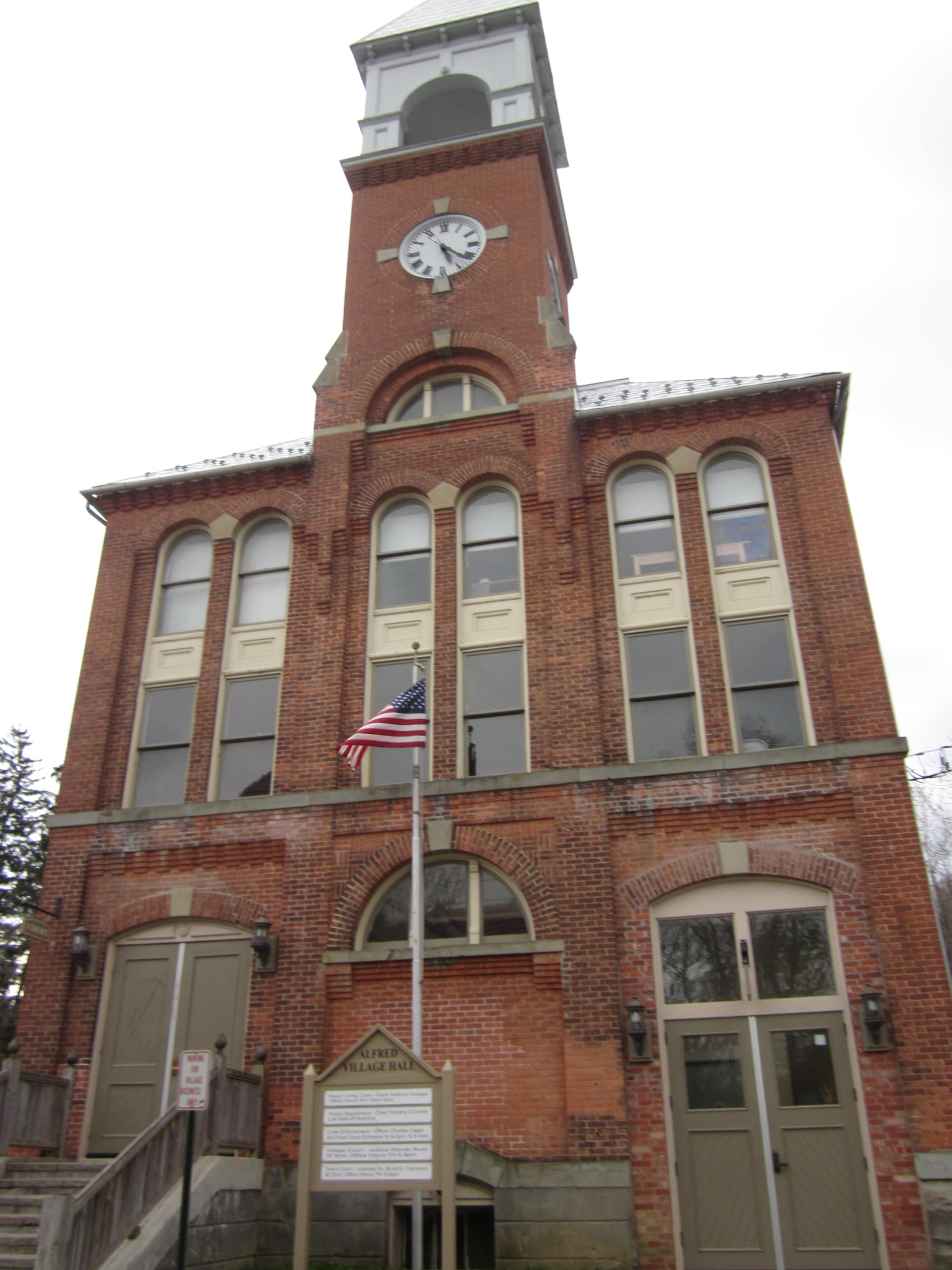
- Fireman's Hall, April 2012

- Location within New York Location within the United States
- Location: 7 W. University St., Alfred, New York
- Coordinates: 42°15′13″N 77°47′29″W
- Area: 0.7 acres (0.28 ha)
- Built: 1890
- Architect: A.E. Crandall Hook & Ladder Co.
- NRHP reference No.: 80004275
- Added to NRHP: March 18, 1980

Fireman's Hall is a historic fire hall located at Alfred in Allegany County, New York. It was built in 1890-1891 by volunteer firemen as the first home of the A.E. Crandall Hook & Ladder Co. It is a massive three story brick and sandstone structure that features an imposing bell / clock tower. The clock, designed by Seth Thomas, was donated by the Samuel Stillman family after the Village ran out of funds for the hall. The weather vane atop depicts a firefighter on a ladder. The building has housed village offices since the 1970s, as well as village court, police station and meeting hall today.

It was listed on the National Register of Historic Places in 1980.
