= Allen Steinheim Museum =

- U.S. National Register of Historic Places
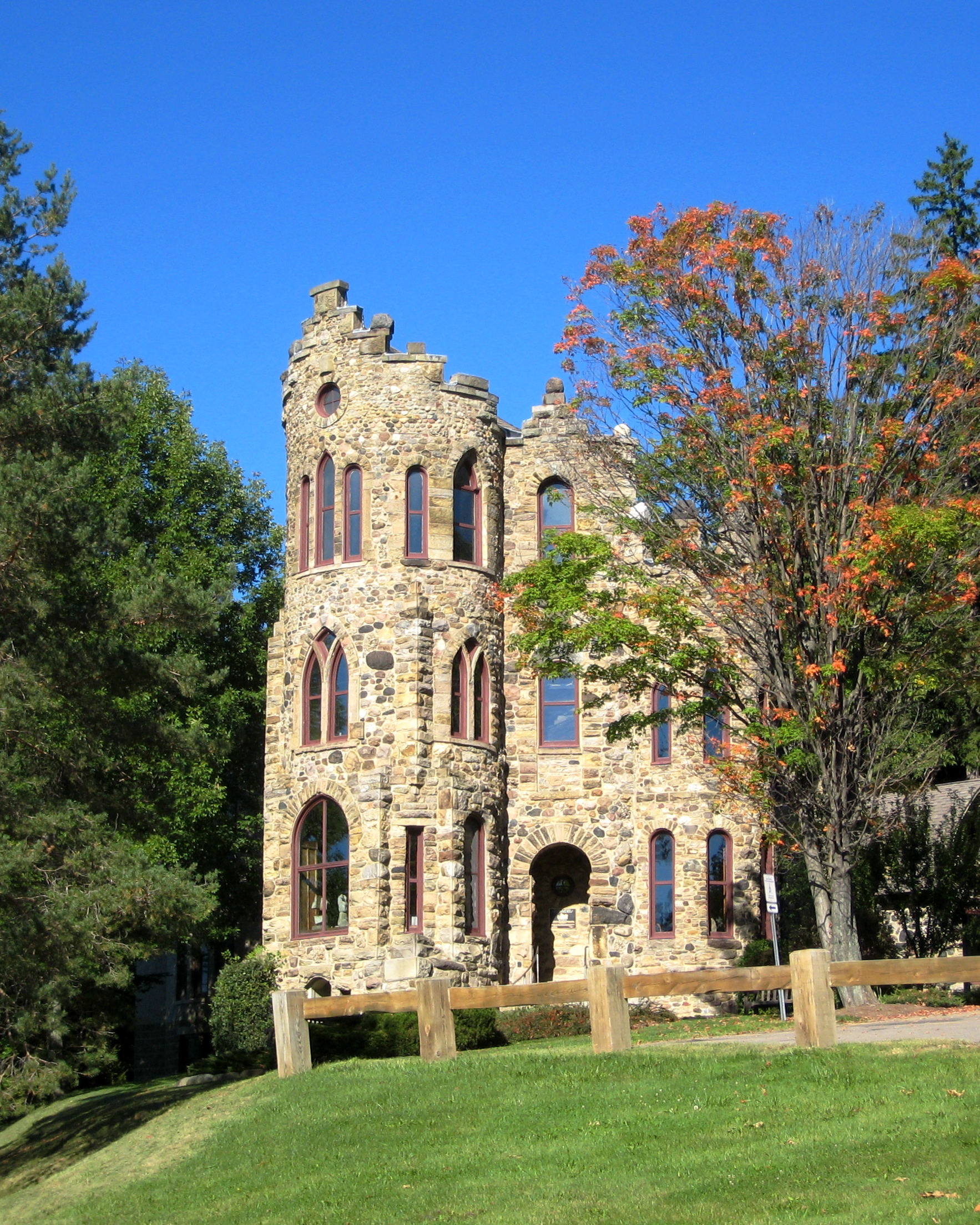
- Alfred University's Steinheim Building, August 2007

- Location within New York Location within the United States
- Map showing location of Allen Stenheim Museum
- Location: Alfred University Campus, Alfred, New York
- Coordinates: 42°15′16″N 77°47′13″W
- Area: less than one acre
- Built: 1876-1880
- Architect: Allen, Jonathan
- NRHP reference No.: 73001163
- Added to NRHP: June 04, 1973

The Allen Steinheim Museum is a historic building and former museum located on the campus of Alfred University at Alfred in Allegany County, New York. It is a crenellated stone structure built from 1876 to 1880 to house the "mineral, geological, natural, and man-made curiosities" of Alfred University's second president Jonathan Allen. The building was originally started by Professor Ida Kenyon, who wished to make a private residence that resembled the castles of her native Germany.

The building is constructed of over 8,000 rock specimens that were combined to form the walls of the structure and 700 samples of local and foreign wood to combine the internal framework. When operating in the 1930s, it was considered the second oldest college museum in the United States. The Federal Writers Project described the museum as exhibiting a unique collection of "rare shells, mounted birds and animals, Indian artifacts and pioneer agricultural implements, early American pottery, Steigel and Sandwich glass, and the finest workmanship in the ceramic arts". The building ceased being used as a museum in the early 1950s, was used as classroom space, and then fell into disrepair.

After a 1995 renovation and a 1997 dedication, the Steinheim, which is German for "stone house," has since housed the Robert R. McComsey Career Development Center.

In 2008, artist Lenka Clayton devoted time to several projects that sought to call attention to the Steinheim Museum's absent collection. Among these projects were: ""7,000 Stones," that collected a symbolic pile of stones- numbered as if part of a collection- which were then discarded; "Found Instructions 1", that used an inventory sheet of the dying collection- found in the university's Special Collections- to create a modern display; and "Amnesty for the Museum," where she put a call out for the missing artifacts of the collection in order to photograph them in their current environment.

It was listed on the National Register of Historic Places in 1973.
