= Christ Episcopal Church (Belvidere, New York) =

Historic church in New York, United States

- U.S. National Register of Historic Places
- Location within New York Location within the United States
- Location: Gibson Hill Rd., SW of Rtes. 19 and 408, Belvidere, New York
- Coordinates: 42.2525°N 78.0628°W
- Area: 2 acres (0.81 ha)
- Built: 1860
- Architectural style: Gothic Revival
- NRHP reference No.: 74001218
- Added to NRHP: May 17, 1974

Christ Episcopal Church is a historic Episcopal church in Belvidere, Allegany County, New York. The Gothic Revival style frame church was built in 1860 and features Carpenter Gothic elements. It is a one-story board and batten clad rectangular structure with a slate gable roof.

It was listed on the National Register of Historic Places in 1974. At the time, it was classified within the Episcopal Church as a "Chapel at Ease," meaning it did not host regular services (those had ceased in the 1930s) but hosted two semi-annual services, one in June and the other in September, staffed by clergy from the Episcopal Churches in surrounding communities. It was officially deconsecrated after the June 2018 service and turned over to a community foundation, which will operate the building as the multi-purpose Belvidere Cornerstone.
