= Alfred (village), New York =

Alfred, New York
- Village
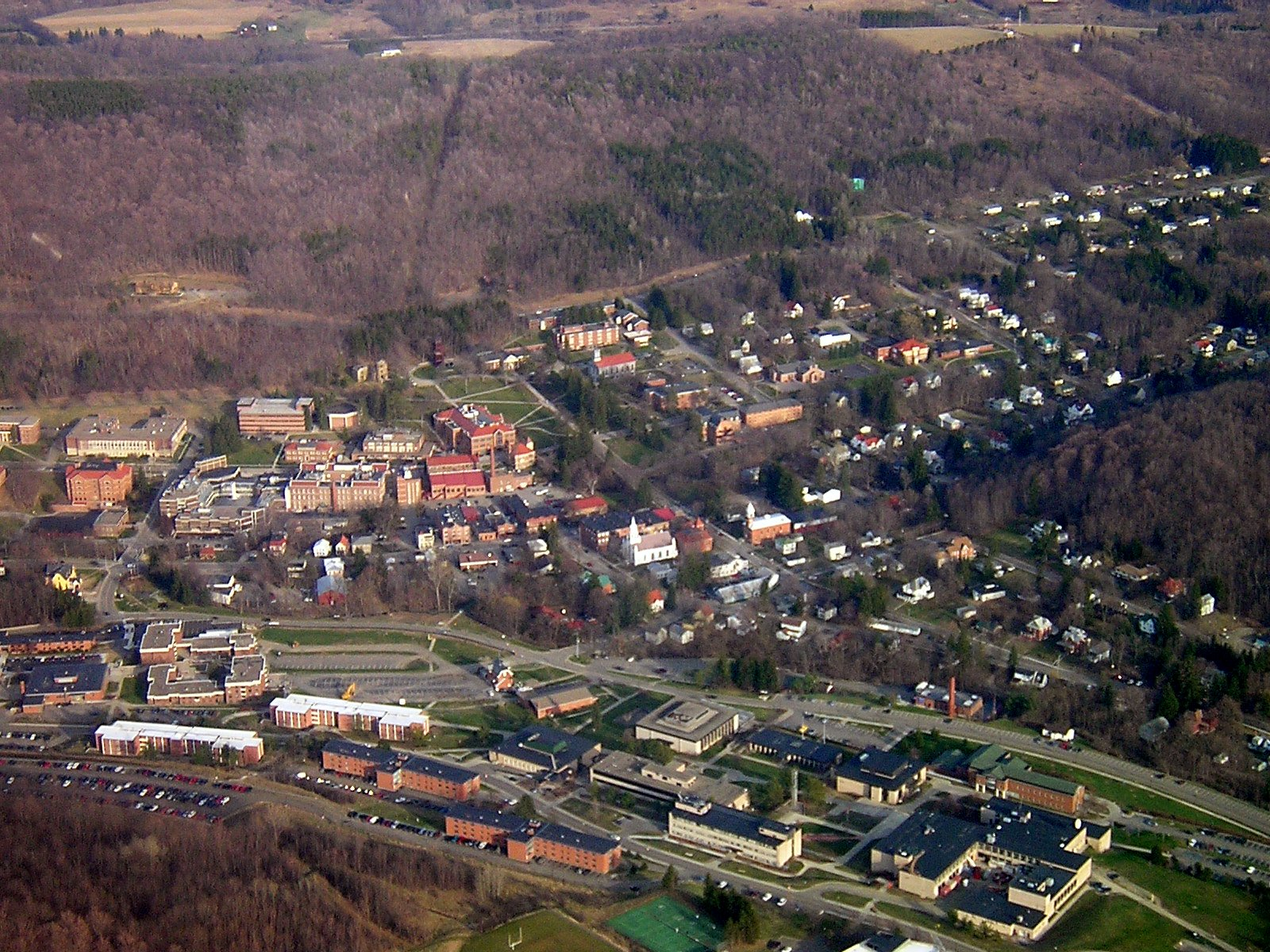
- Aerial view of Alfred village, taken April 2006. Alfred State College is near the bottom of the photo, and at the upper-middle is Alfred University.

- Seal

- Location within the state of New York Alfred (the United States) Alfred (North America)
- Coordinates: 42°15′20″N 77°47′21″W
- Country: United States
- State: New York
- County: Allegany
- Town: Alfred
- First settled: 1807
- Incorporated (Village): 1881

Government
  - Mayor: Jim Ninos

Area
  - Total: 1.19 sq mi (3.08 km^{2})
  - Land: 1.19 sq mi (3.08 km^{2})
  - Water: 0 sq mi (0.00 km^{2})
- Elevation: 1,765 ft (538 m)

Population (2020)
  - Total: 4,026
  - Density: 3,383.6/sq mi (1,306.43/km^{2})
- Time zone: UTC-5 (Eastern (EST))
  - Summer (DST): UTC-4 (EDT)
- ZIP code: 14802
- Area code: 607
- FIPS code: 36-01198
- GNIS feature ID: 942313
- Website: www.alfredny.org

Alfred is a village located in the town of Alfred in Allegany County, New York, United States. The population was 4,026 at the 2020 census.

The village is home to both Alfred University and Alfred State College. In 2023, The Washington Post named it "the collegiest college town in America" due to its high ratio of students to non-students.

Due in part to the New York State College of Ceramics, Alfred has become a hub for ceramic artists and ceramic engineers.

== History ==
=== 19th century ===
The area around Alfred had historically been home to the Seneca tribe. In 1807, three Seventh Day Baptists, Clark Crandall, Nathan Green, and Edward Green, moved to the area with their families, becoming the first of many members of that sect to move to the village and surrounding region.

Alfred's name has traditionally been attributed to Alfred the Great, however that has never been definitively verified. For much of its early history the village of Alfred was known as Alfred Centre.

Alfred became home to an institution of higher education in 1832, when Alfred University was founded. The college was coeducational from its inception and tried to provide practical as well as liberal education for students. This university was initially considered the principal seat of higher learning supported by the Seventh Day Baptists although it was not directly supported by the denomination.

The village was a hotbed of support for the abolition movement and during the American Civil War nearly 150 residents fought for the union.

In 1888 the Celadon Terra Cotta Company was founded after the discovery of high-quality clay in the area. The company grew over the next decade to become a leading producer of roof tile and architectural terra cotta. The presence of this and the nearby Alfred Clay Company helped to establish Alfred as a ceramics hub, and led to the local university being selected as the home of the New York State College of Ceramics in 1900.

=== 20th century ===
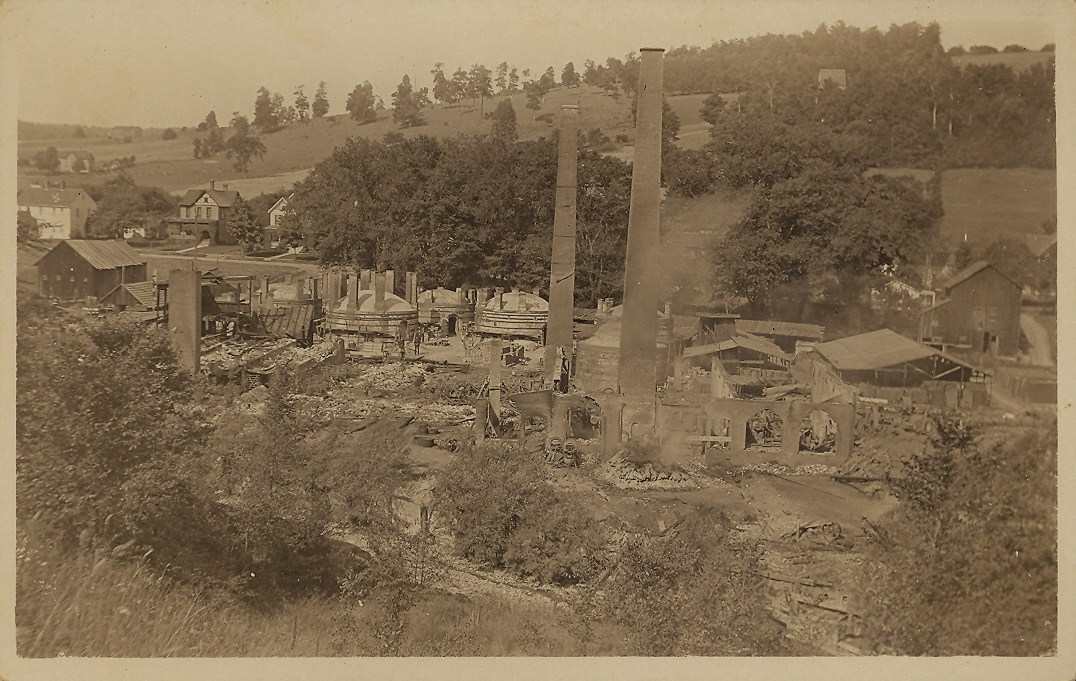
Remains of Alfred's Celadon factory after fire, December 1909

The new college recruited British ceramicist Charles Fergus Binns as a director and professor. Binns was a proponent of the Arts and Crafts movement and considered it essential for a student of ceramics to understand both the artistic and technical aspects of their craft. Under his leadership the college grew into a leading institution of ceramic studies, eventually developing separate schools for ceramic art and ceramic engineering. As a result of the college's prominence, Alfred remained a hub for ceramics even after the burning of the Celadon Terra Cotta Company's local factory in 1909.

A statutory agricultural school was formed at Alfred University in 1908, with a farm, livestock, and farm machinery for trade education. In 1937 a school of Engineering Technology was formed at this college, and in 1948 the entire college was spun off from Alfred University to form Alfred State College.

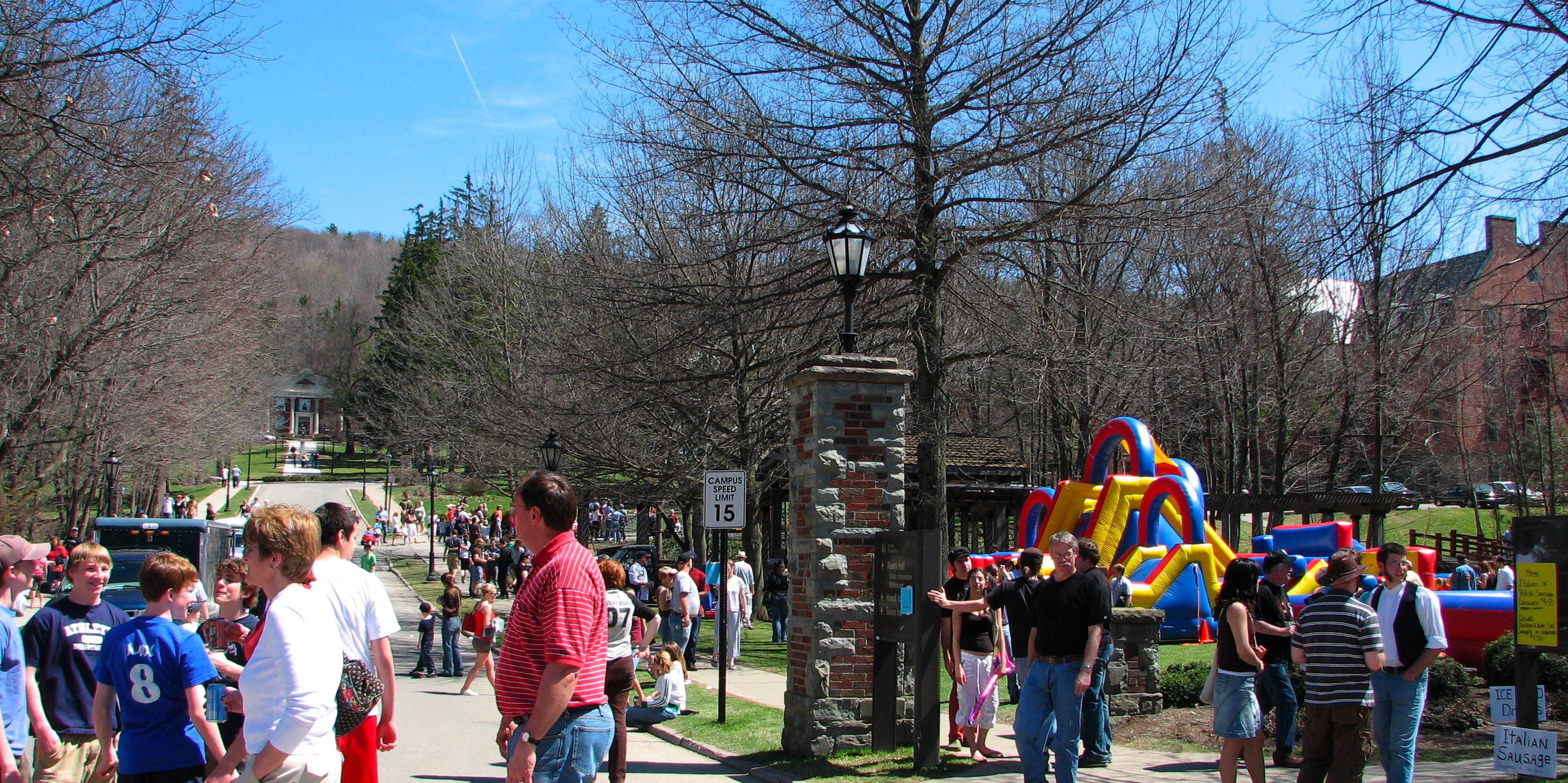
A crowd at Hot Dog Day 2007. Alfred University's Susan Howell Hall and statue of King Alfred are visible on the left.

From 1940 to 1957 the village was home to Glidden Pottery, a unique stoneware-bodied dinnerware with designs by founder Glidden Parker, Sergio Dello Strologo, Fong Chow, and others. These pieces were affordable for many, yet showcased midcentury modern styles and designs. They have become collectable in the years since the pottery's closing.

On April 30, 1972, the village hosted the first Hot Dog Day, organized jointly by Alfred University and Alfred State College students.

== Historic Structures ==
Alfred is home to numerous buildings and properties listed on the National Register of Historic Places: Alumni Hall, Fireman's Hall, Steinheim Castle and the Terra Cotta Building. Additionally, 55 properties in Alfred's downtown form the Alfred Village Historic District.

== Geography ==
Alfred is approximately located at 42.3° north latitude, 77.8° west longitude.

According to the United States Census Bureau, the village has a total area of 1.2 square miles (3.1 km^{2}), all land. A small stream, Kanakadea Creek, flows through the center of the village, then to the Canisteo River, part of the Susquehanna River watershed. The topography is steep hill country, part of the Allegheny Plateau, a physiographic region that is part of the Appalachian Mountains.

Alfred is located in the hills of western New York along the Southern Tier. The layout of the valley is such that the lowest part contains the village, and upon the hills to the east and west are Alfred University and Alfred State College, respectively. The valley was originally called Kanakadea (or Canakadea, or other spellings) by Native Americans.

The elevation of Alfred is about 1,700 feet (520 m) but rises to a high point of 2,355 feet (718 m) at the summit of Jericho Hill just south of the village. The hills greatly affect the weather in the region, which results in quick changes as well as different conditions in neighboring valleys.

== Demographics ==
Historical population
Census	Pop.	Note	%±
1860	177		—
1880	513		—
1890	786		53.2%
1900	756		−3.8%
1910	759		0.4%
1920	598		−21.2%
1930	639		6.9%
1940	694		8.6%
1950	2,053		195.8%
1960	2,807		36.7%
1970	3,804		35.5%
1980	4,967		30.6%
1990	4,559		−8.2%
2000	3,954		−13.3%
2010	4,174		5.6%
2020	4,026		−3.5%
U.S. Decennial Census

As of the census of 2000, there were 3,954 people, 530 households, and 169 families residing in the village. The population density was 3,352.5 inhabitants per square mile (1,294.4/km^{2}). There were 576 housing units at an average density of 488.4 per square mile (188.6/km^{2}). The racial makeup of the village was 90.21% White, 4.40% Black or African American, 0.33% Native American, 2.71% Asian, 0.03% Pacific Islander, 1.21% from other races, and 1.11% from two or more races. Hispanic or Latino of any race were 2.73% of the population.

There were 530 households, out of which 12.3% had children under the age of 18 living with them, 26.0% were married couples living together, 4.2% had a female householder with no husband present, and 68.1% were non-families. 38.9% of all households were made up of individuals, and 10.6% had someone living alone who was 65 years of age or older. The average household size was 2.05 and the average family size was 2.73.

In the village, the population was spread out, with 3.0% under the age of 18, 83.1% from 18 to 24, 5.9% from 25 to 44, 4.6% from 45 to 64, and 3.3% who were 65 years of age or older. The median age was 20 years. For every 100 females, there were 144.8 males. For every 100 females age 18 and over, there were 147.2 males.

The median income for a household in the village was $21,313, and the median income for a family was $70,694. Males had a median income of $15,750 versus $39,375 for females. The per capita income for the village was $8,224. About 2.0% of families and 37.7% of the population were below the poverty line, including none of those under age 18 and 2.8% of those age 65 or over.

== Gallery ==
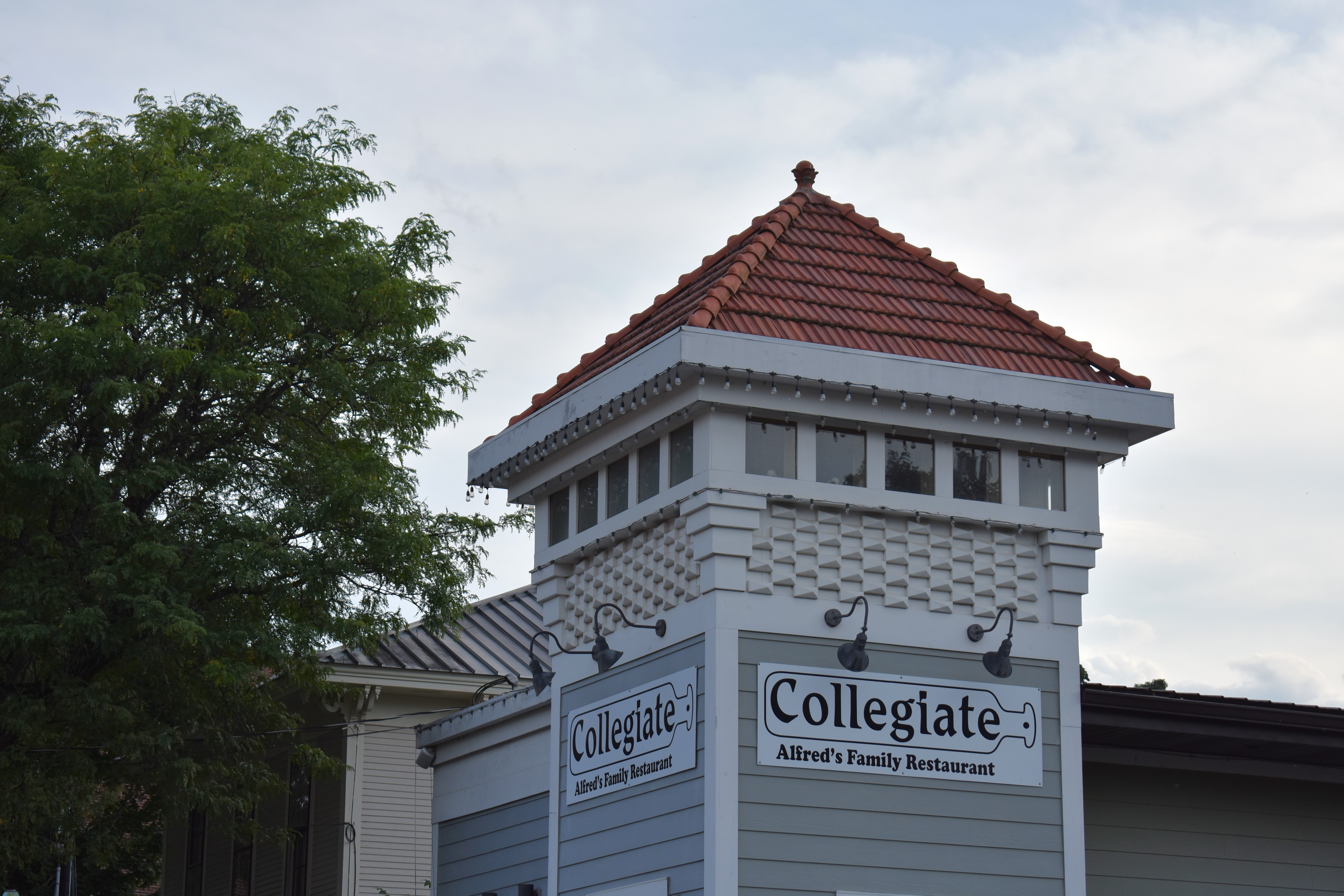
The Collegiate "Jet" Restaurant

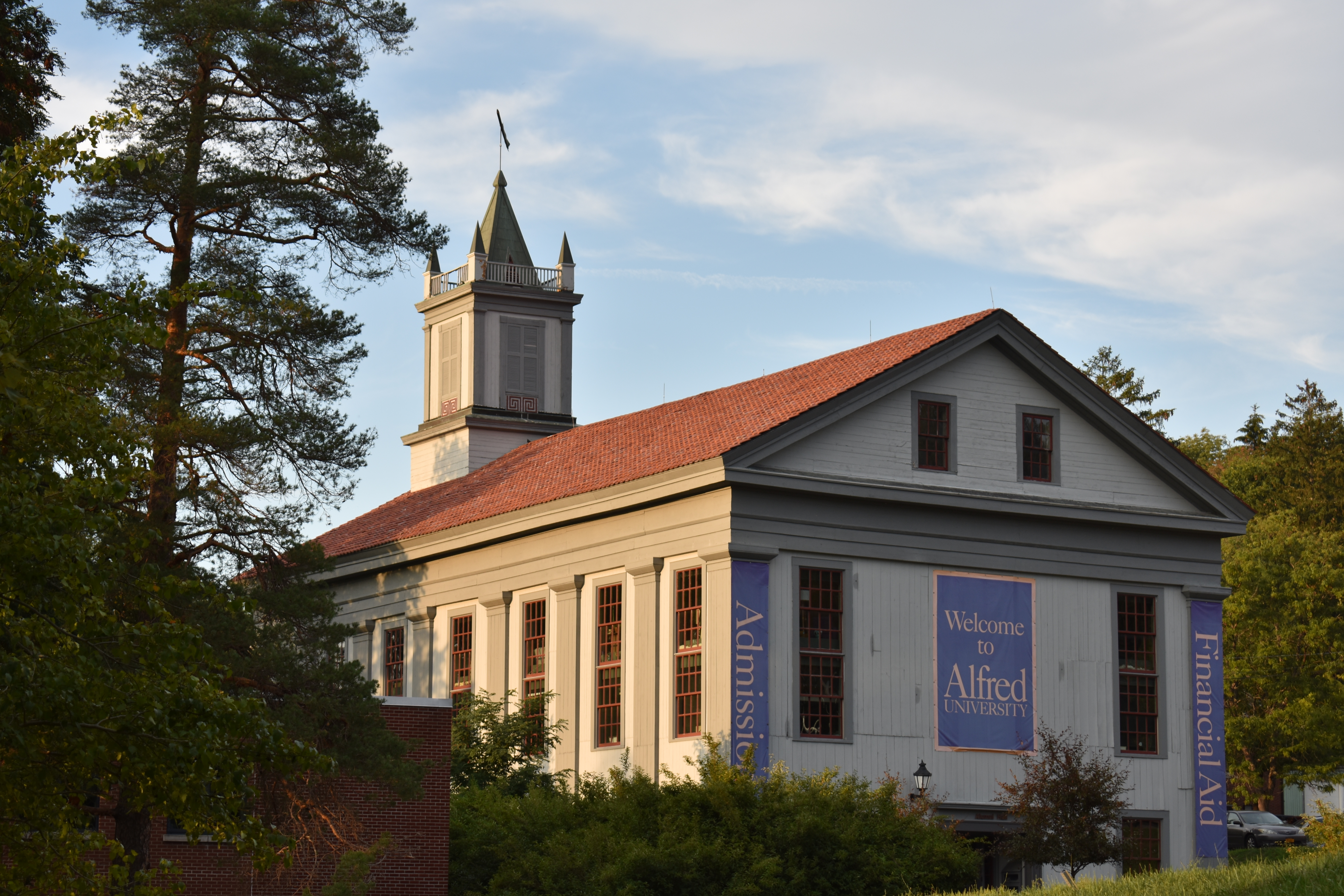
Alumni Hall

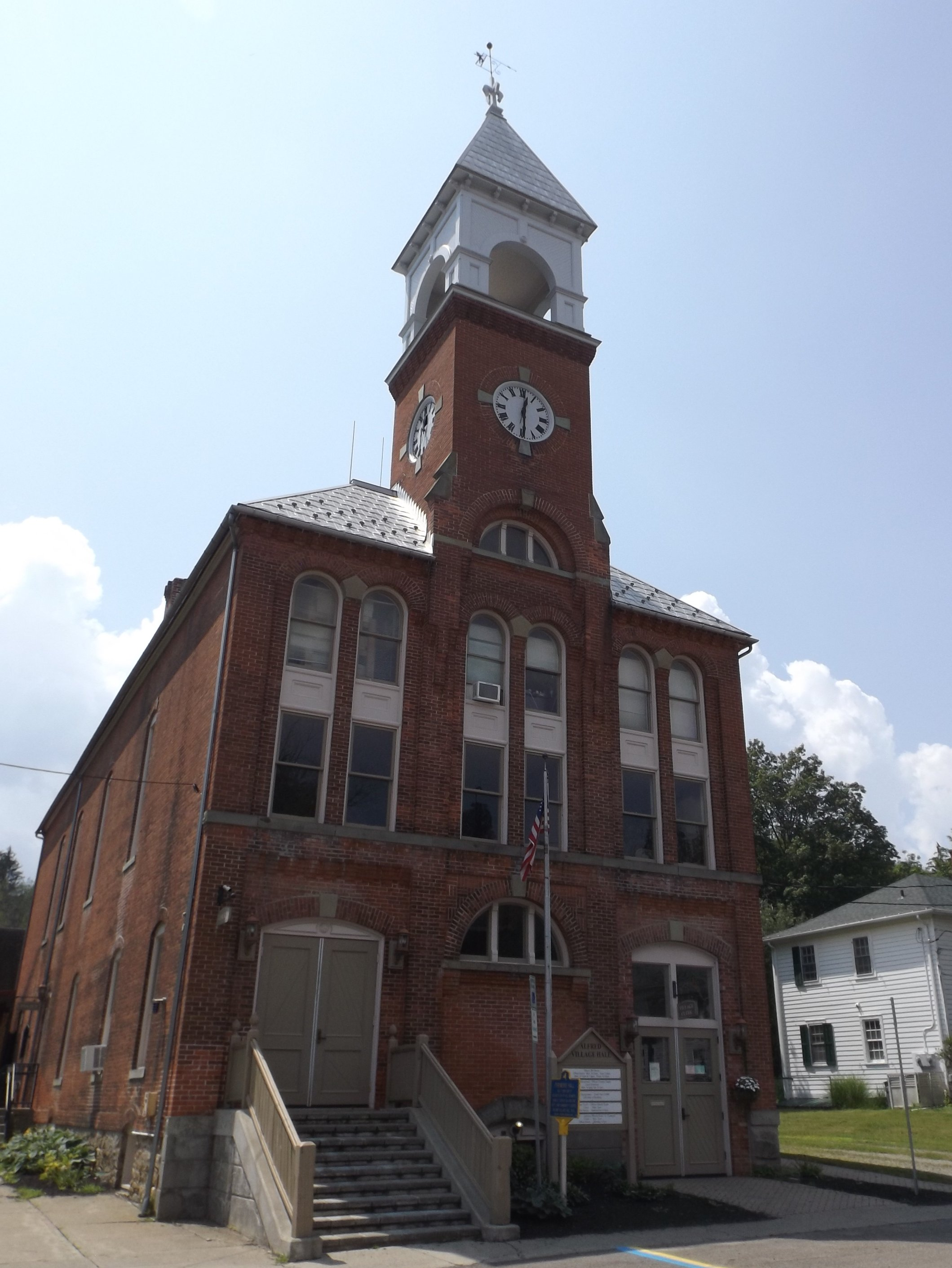
Fireman's Hall

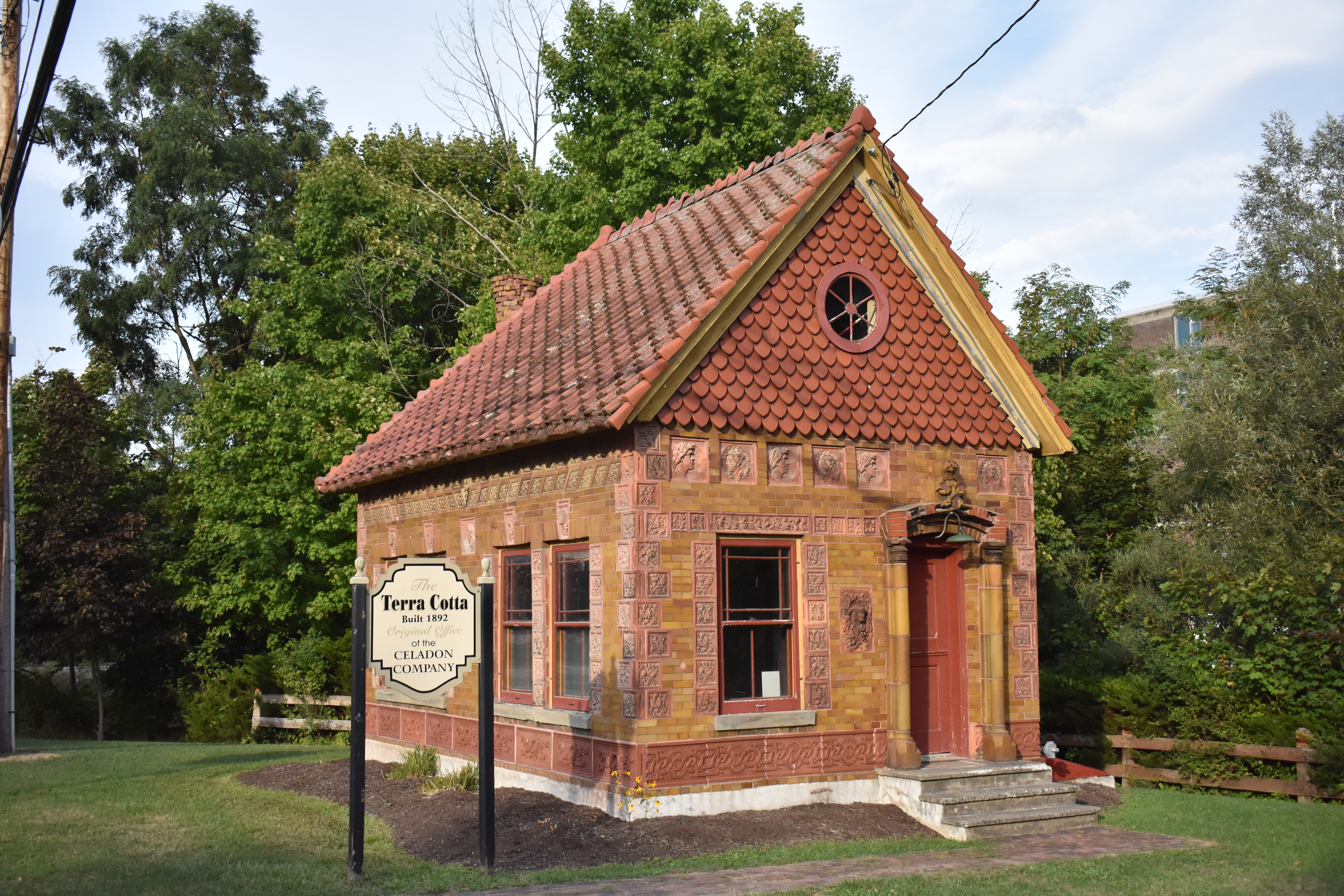
The Terra Cotta building

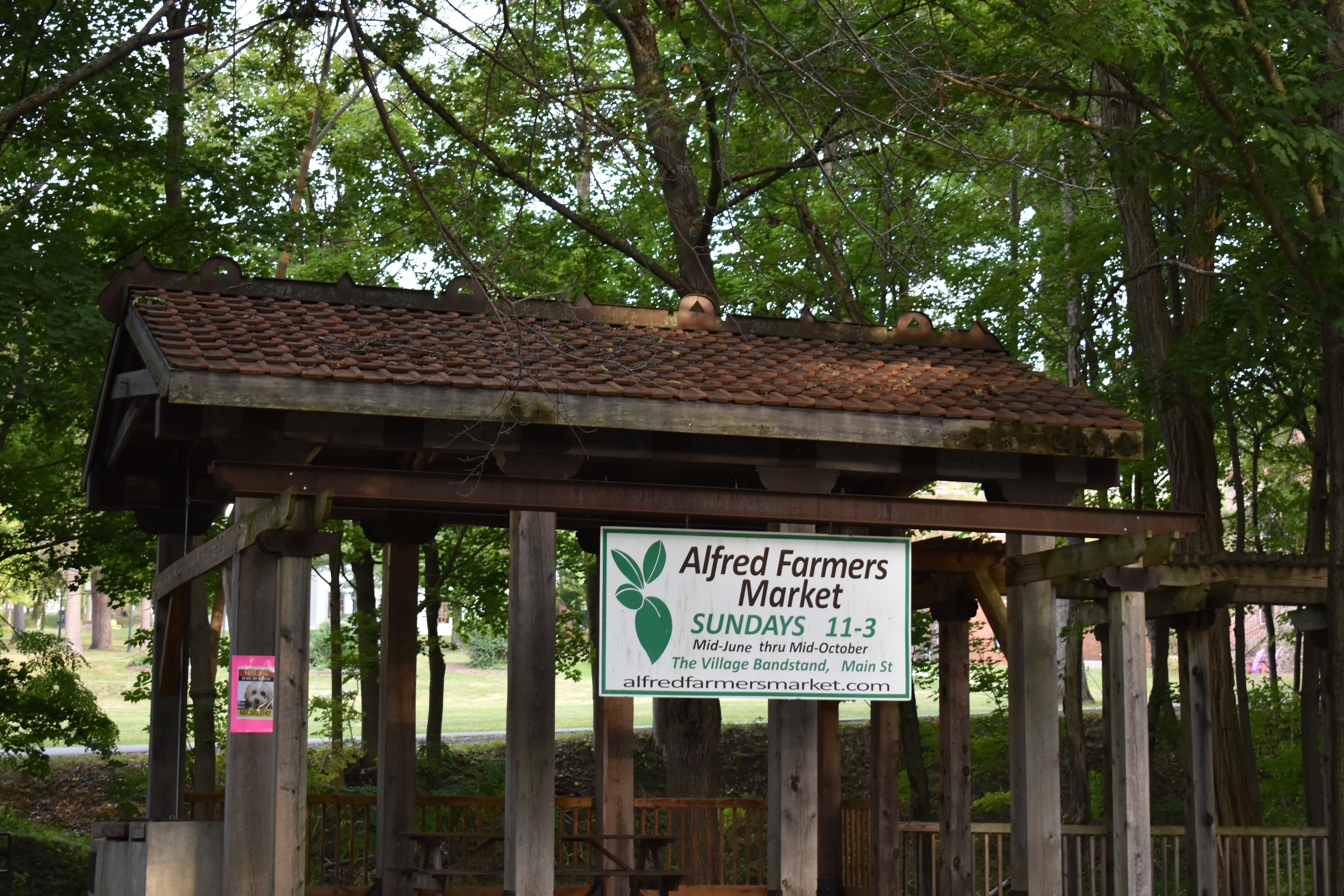
Village bandstand

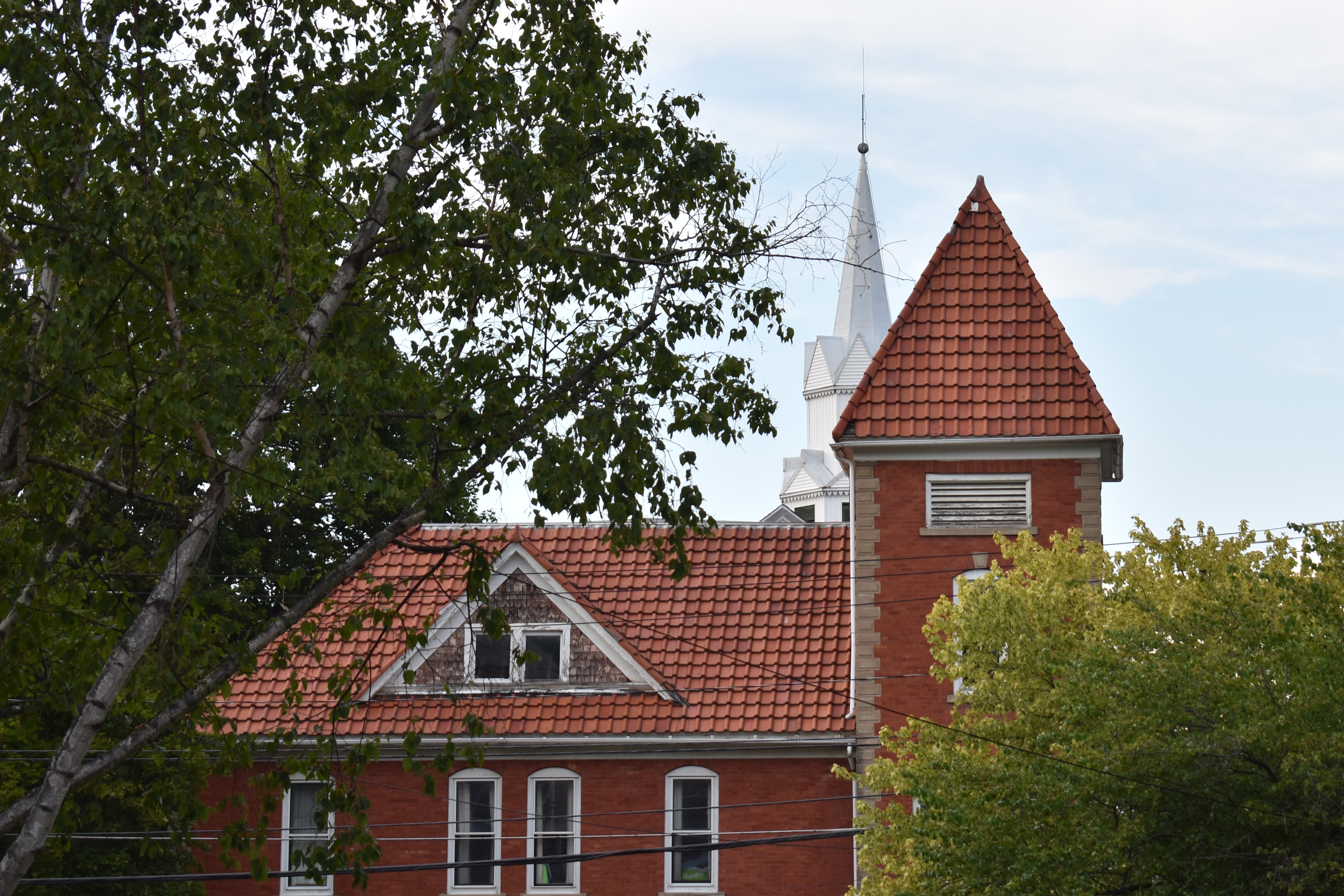
The Seventh Day Parish House, part of the village historic district

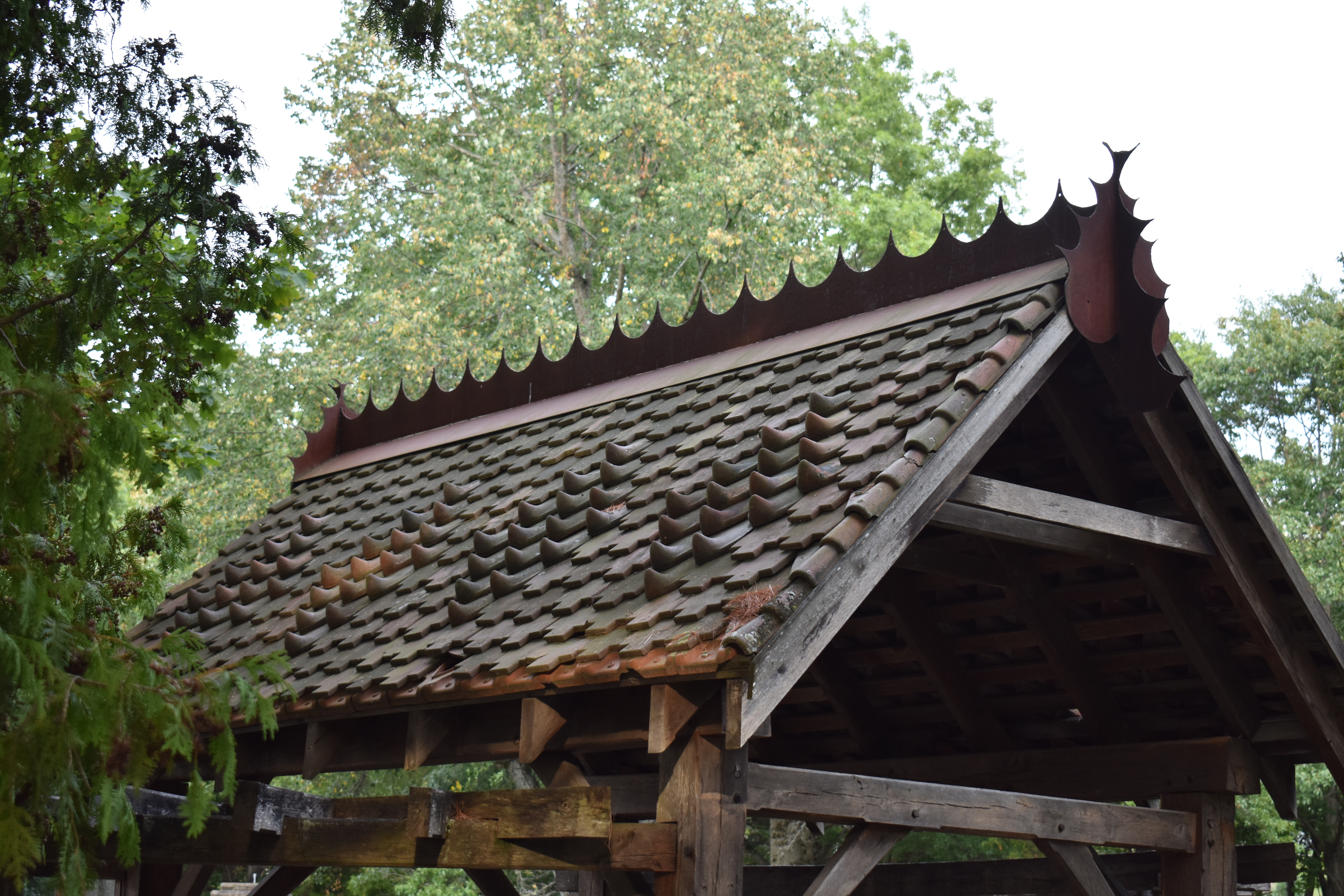
Clay tile roof on village bus stop
