= South Street Historic District (Cuba, New York) =

Historic district in New York, United States

- U.S. National Register of Historic Places
- U.S. Historic district
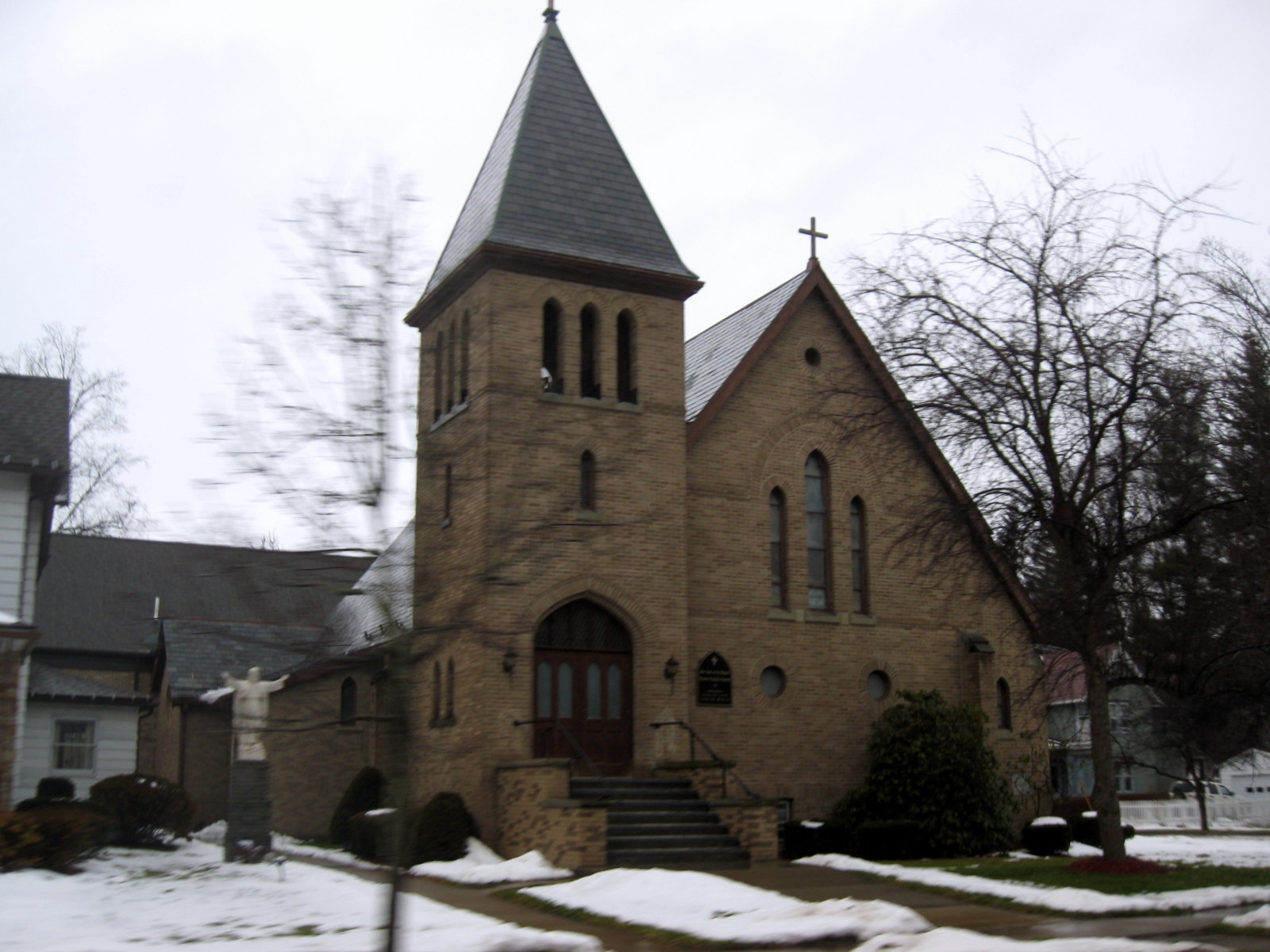
- Our Lady of Angels Catholic Church, South Street Historic District, January 2010

- Location within New York Location within the United States
- Location: 17, 19--89 South St., Cuba, New York
- Coordinates: 42°12′50″N 78°16′31″W
- Area: 12 acres (4.9 ha)
- Architectural style: Late 19th And 20th Century Revivals, Greek Revival, Late Victorian
- NRHP reference No.: 88000585
- Added to NRHP: May 26, 1988

South Street Historic District is a national historic district located at Cuba in Allegany County, New York. The district consists of 12 acres (49,000 m^{2}) and includes 48 contributing buildings. It encompasses the village of Cuba's most distinguished residential enclave. The structures date from about 1840 to about 1938-1939 and reflect a variety of popular architectural styles. The district consists of 37 residential properties dating from 1840 to 1940 and three churches : First Baptist and Christ Episcopal, 1871, and Our Lady of Angels Roman Catholic, 1926. The district begins at the First Baptist Church and ends at the railroad underpass at the south end.

It was listed on the National Register of Historic Places in 1988.
