= Ceres School =

- U.S. National Register of Historic Places
- Location within New York Location within the United States
- Location: School St., Ceres, New York
- Coordinates: 41°59′58″N 78°16′22″W
- Area: 0.5 acres (0.20 ha)
- Built: 1855, 1893
- Architectural style: Italianate, Queen Anne
- NRHP reference No.: 10000991
- Added to NRHP: December 7, 2010

Ceres School is a historic two-room school building located at Ceres in Allegany County, New York. It was built in 1855 and remodeled in 1893 with Italianate and Queen Anne style design elements. It is a one-story, gross-gabled frame building topped by a belfry. It is a surviving example of a late 19th-century schoolhouse, which served students from both Pennsylvania and New York. The school closed following World War II and used as a community center.

It was listed on the National Register of Historic Places in 2010.
