= Cuba Cemetery =

Historic cemetery in New York, United States

- U.S. National Register of Historic Places
- Location within New York Location within the United States
- Location: 47 Medbury Ave. opposite Union St., Cuba, New York
- Coordinates: 42°13′18″N 78°16′10″W
- Area: 12.73 acres (5.15 ha)
- Built: 1841
- Built by: William J. Crawford & Co.; A. Robertson & Sons
- Architectural style: Gothic Revival
- NRHP reference No.: 15000004
- Added to NRHP: February 12, 2015

Cuba Cemetery is a historic rural cemetery located at Cuba in Allegany County, New York. It was established in 1841, and later expanded and incorporated neighboring cemeteries. It includes 5,886 total interments as of late 2016 and remains an active burial ground. Located in the cemetery are the Gothic Revival style vault (1914) and McKee mausoleum (1875). Another notable feature is the Green mausoleum (1925).

It was listed on the National Register of Historic Places in 2015.
