= Alumni Hall (Vanderbilt University) =

- Alumni Memorial Hall, Vanderbilt University
- U.S. National Register of Historic Places
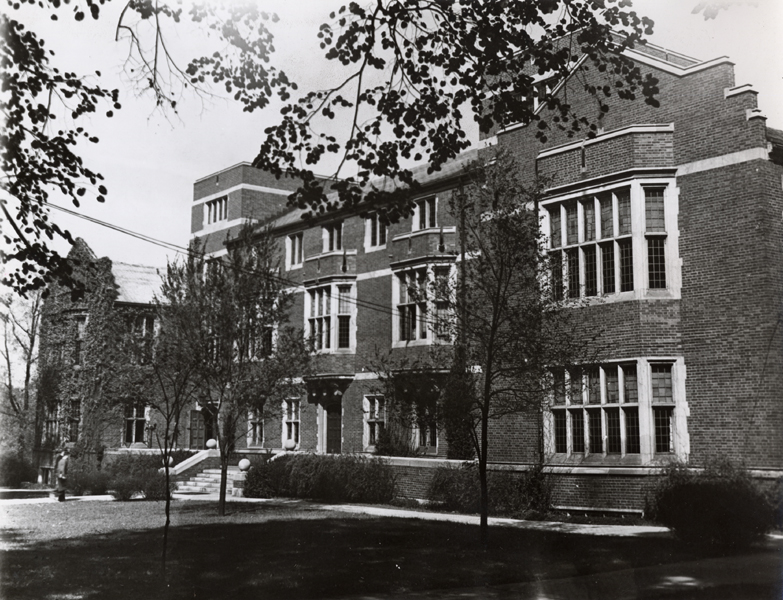

- Location within Tennessee Location within the United States
- Location: 2205 West End Avenue, Nashville, Tennessee
- Coordinates: 36.1480°N 86.8033°W
- Built: 1925
- Architect: Henry C. Hibbs
- Architectural style: Collegiate Gothic
- NRHP reference No.: 11000418
- Added to NRHP: July 6, 2011

For Confederate Memorial Hall, see Memorial Hall, Vanderbilt University.

Alumni Hall is a historic building on the campus of Vanderbilt University in Nashville, Tennessee. Designed in the Collegiate Gothic style by Henry C. Hibbs, it was built in 1925 to commemorate the 44 Vanderbilt men who died in World War I. It was added to the National Register of Historic Places in 2011. The building was renovated in 2013 and is currently used as a student center.
