= Main Street Historic District (Cuba, New York) =

Historic district in New York, United States

- U.S. National Register of Historic Places
- U.S. Historic district
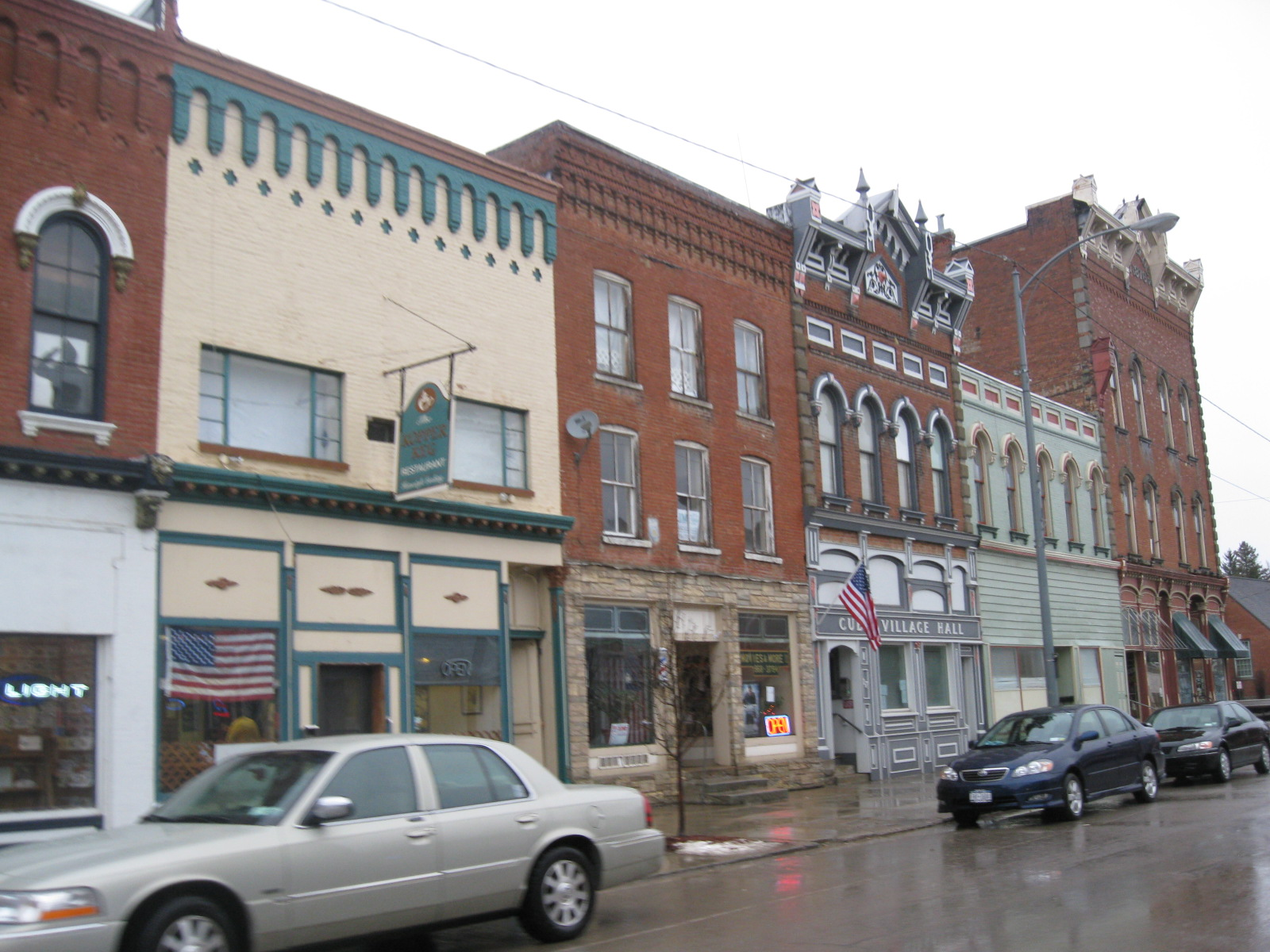
- Main Street Historic District, January 2010

- Location within New York Location within the United States
- Location: Roughly along Main St., from Orchard St. to Green St., Cuba, New York
- Coordinates: 42°13′1″N 78°16′33″W
- Area: 9 acres (3.6 ha)
- Built: 1835
- Architectural style: Greek Revival, Italianate
- NRHP reference No.: 99000087
- Added to NRHP: February 5, 1999

Main Street Historic District is a national historic district located at Cuba in Allegany County, New York. The district consists of nine acres and includes 31 contributing buildings. It encompasses the village of Cuba's commercial district, which includes a small number of prominent religious, civic, and residential structures. The structures date from about 1835 to about 1948.

It was listed on the National Register of Historic Places in 1999.
