= Centerville, New York =

- Town
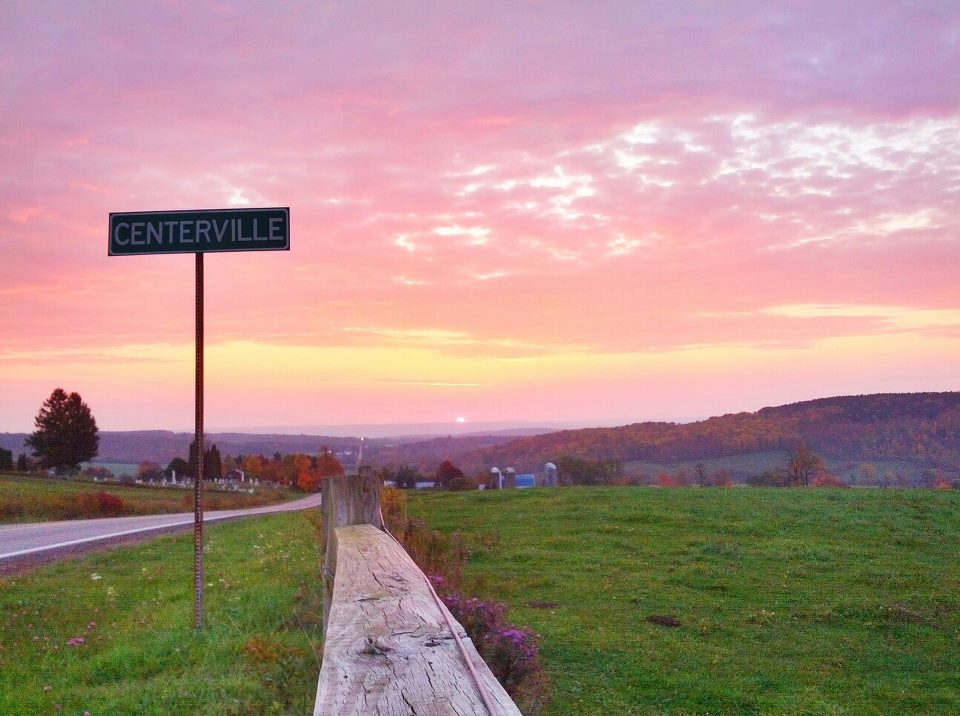
- Sunrise in Centerville

- Location within New York Location within the United States
- Coordinates: 42°28′51″N 78°14′35″W
- Country: United States
- State: New York
- County: Allegany

Government
  - Type: Town Council
  - Town Supervisor: Marc Bliss (R)
  - Town Council: Members' List: • Mike Vosburg (R); • Ronald Pixley (R); • Max Hodnett (R); • John Clayson (R)

Area
  - Total: 35.48 sq mi (91.88 km^{2})
  - Land: 35.43 sq mi (91.76 km^{2})
  - Water: 0.046 sq mi (0.12 km^{2})
- Elevation: 1,732 ft (528 m)

Population (2010)
  - Total: 822
  - Estimate (2016): 814
  - Density: 23.0/sq mi (8.87/km^{2})
- Time zone: UTC-5 (Eastern (EST))
  - Summer (DST): UTC-4 (EDT)
- ZIP Codes: 14029 (Centerville); 14024 (Bliss); 14060 (Farmersville Station); 14065 (Freedom); 14735 (Fillmore); 14744 (Houghton)
- Area code: 585
- FIPS code: 36-003-13475
- GNIS feature ID: 0978807
- Website: centerville.wordpress.com

Centerville is a town in Allegany County, New York, United States. The population was 822 at the 2010 census. The town is in the northwest corner of Allegany County and is named after its principal settlement.

== History ==
Centerville was first settled in April 1808 by Joseph Maxson. Minard describes this first settler in his History of Centerville:

"He was only 18, and came from Otsego Co. Two cents and a few articles of provisions and clothing constituted his wealth. At Pike he took from his feet a pair of new shoes, bartered them for an axe, and pushed on into the wilderness, and in the center of the township near a small stream erected the rudest kind of a hut. For a bed he peeled basswood bark, used some pieces as a floor and others for covering. Not long after he came snow fell six inches deep. He persevered in his labors and passed eight months alone."²

James Ward settled there in the fall of 1808, and a half dozen more families moved there in the following year. Centerville (then spelled "Centreville") was established on January 15, 1819, from part of the town of Pike (a town in Wyoming County).^{1}

In recent years many Amish farmers have bought land in the town.

The Centerville Town Hall was listed on the National Register of Historic Places in 2009.

== Geography ==
According to the United States Census Bureau, the town has a total area of 35.5 square miles (91.9 km^{2}), of which 35.4 square miles (91.8 km^{2}) is land and 0.04 square miles (0.1 km^{2}), or 0.13%, is water.

The west town line is the border of Cattaraugus County, and the north town line is the border of Wyoming County.

Sixtown Creek is an important stream in the town.

New York State Route 243 passes through the community of Fairview.

=== Adjacent towns and areas ===
Centerville is west of the town of Hume and north of the town of Rushford. The west town line is shared with the town of Freedom in Cattaraugus County, and the north town line is shared with the town of Eagle in Wyoming County.

== Demographics ==
Historical population
Census	Pop.	Note	%±
1820	421		—
1830	1,195		183.8%
1840	1,513		26.6%
1850	1,441		−4.8%
1860	1,323		−8.2%
1870	1,043		−21.2%
1880	956		−8.3%
1890	911		−4.7%
1900	833		−8.6%
1910	781		−6.2%
1920	668		−14.5%
1930	553		−17.2%
1940	559		1.1%
1950	545		−2.5%
1960	491		−9.9%
1970	526		7.1%
1980	696		32.3%
1990	678		−2.6%
2000	762		12.4%
2010	822		7.9%
2016 (est.)	814		−1.0%
U.S. Decennial Census

As of the census of 2000, there were 762 people, 253 households, and 195 families residing in the town. The population density was 21.5 inhabitants per square mile (8.3/km^{2}). There were 402 housing units at an average density of 11.4 per square mile (4.4/km^{2}). The racial makeup of the town was 95.80% White, 0.13% African American, 0.52% Native American, 1.05% Asian, 2.10% from other races, and 0.39% from two or more races. Hispanic or Latino of any race were 2.49% of the population.

There were 253 households, out of which 40.7% had children under the age of 18 living with them, 58.9% were married couples living together, 13.8% had a female householder with no husband present, and 22.9% were non-families. 18.2% of all households were made up of individuals, and 7.5% had someone living alone who was 65 years of age or older. The average household size was 3.01 and the average family size was 3.38.

In the town, the population was spread out, with 34.6% under the age of 18, 7.6% from 18 to 24, 26.9% from 25 to 44, 22.7% from 45 to 64, and 8.1% who were 65 years of age or older. The median age was 31 years. For every 100 females, there were 96.9 males. For every 100 females age 18 and over, there were 101.6 males.

The median income for a household in the town was $28,487, and the median income for a family was $31,058. Males had a median income of $25,208 versus $20,750 for females. The per capita income for the town was $11,674. About 22.4% of families and 32.8% of the population were below the poverty line, including 46.4% of those under age 18 and 31.7% of those age 65 or over.

== Communities and locations in Centerville ==
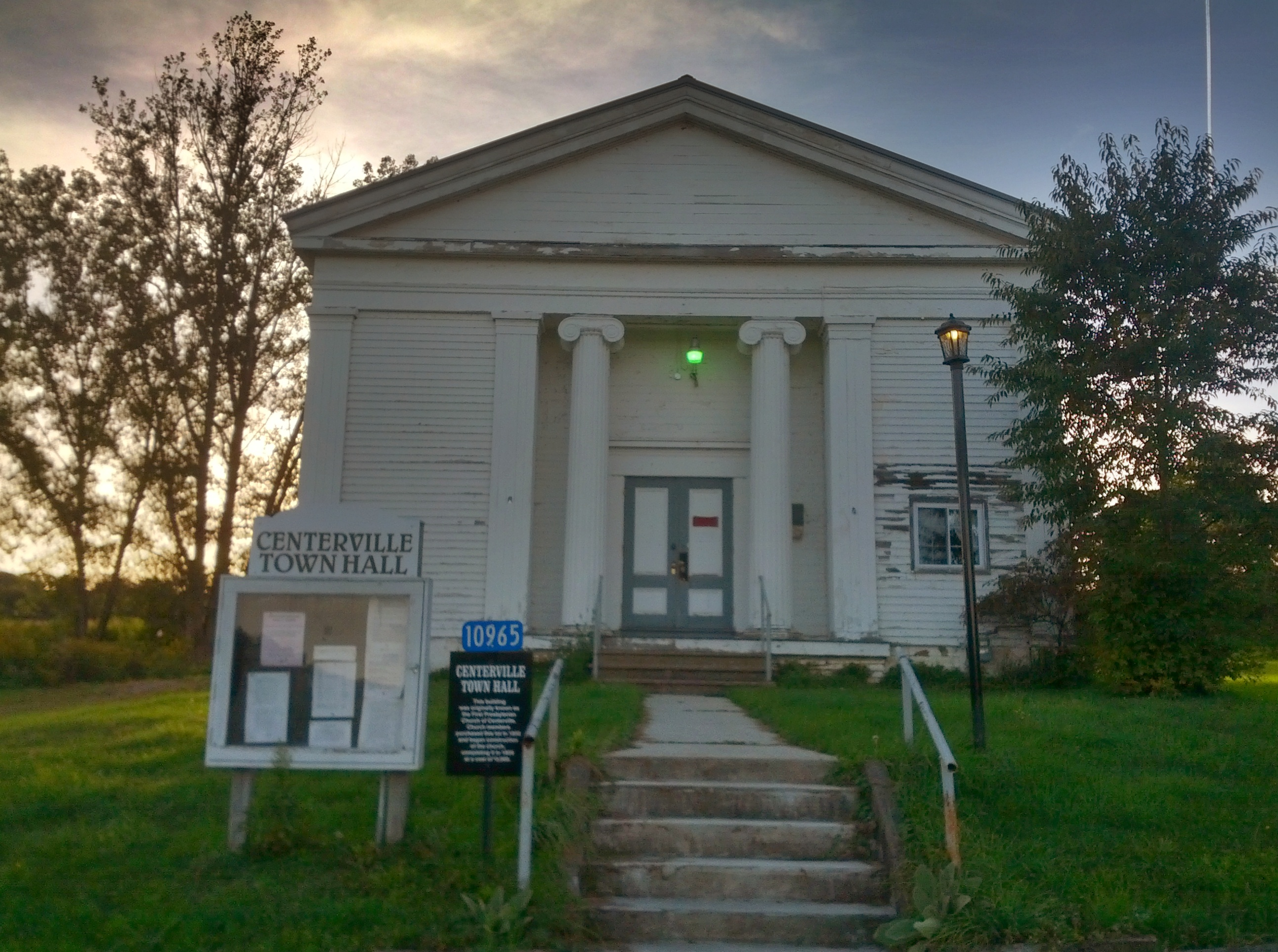
Centerville Town Hall

- Centerville – The hamlet of Centerville is near the town center at the junction of Buffalo, Pike and Hill Roads.
- Fairview – A hamlet on the town line in the southwest corner of the town on Route 243.
- Higgins – The hamlet is southeast of Centerville.
- Welsh Settlement – A former designation for the southwest part of the town, settled in the 1840s by many natives of Wales.

== Notable people ==
- Ellen Palmer Allerton (1835–1893), poet
- Ezra Kendall (1861–1910), actor-comedian, humorist, playwright and author
- Clifford Goldsmith, playwright best known for creating The Aldrich Family, which was set in a larger, fictionalized version of Centerville
