= Alfred Village Historic District =

Historic district in New York, United States

- U.S. National Register of Historic Places
- U.S. Historic district
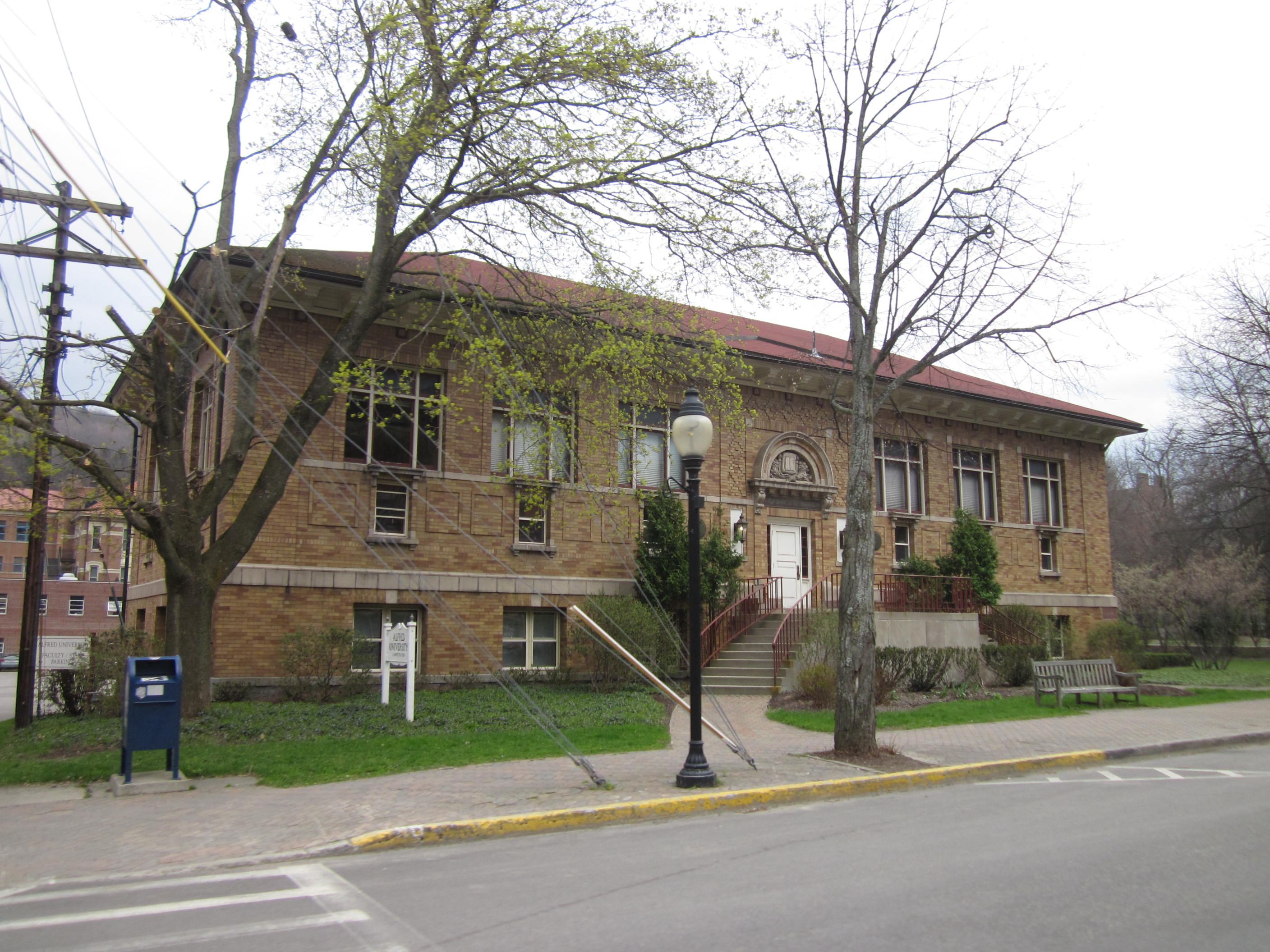
- Carnegie Hall, April 2012

- Location within New York Location within the United States
- Location: Sections of N. & S. Main, Church, Ford, Glenn, Park, Sayles, Terrace & W. University Sts., Alfred, New York
- Coordinates: 42°15′13″N 77°47′19″W
- Area: 55 acres (22 ha)
- Built: 1818
- Architectural style: Greek Revival, Mixed (more than 2 styles from different periods), Gothic Revival
- NRHP reference No.: 85002323
- Added to NRHP: September 11, 1985

Alfred Village Historic District is a national historic district located at Alfred in Allegany County, New York, in the United States. The district consists of 55 acres (22 ha) and includes 133 properties (154 contributing elements). Structures in the district date from about 1818 to the 1930s and include a variety of popular American architectural styles. The district is predominantly residential with occasional examples of commercial, religious, and civic architecture. The most striking feature of the district is the wealth and quality of terra cotta as a building material and for decorative detail.

It was listed on the National Register of Historic Places in 1992.
