= Cuba (village), New York =

Cuba, New York
- Village
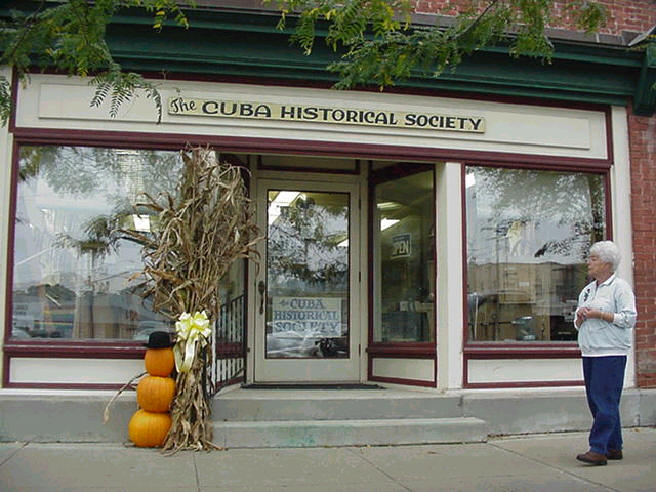
- The Cuba Historical Society in Cuba

- Location within the state of New York
- Coordinates: 42°13′4″N 78°16′31″W
- Country: United States
- State: New York
- County: Allegany
- Town: Cuba

Area
  - Total: 1.22 sq mi (3.15 km^{2})
  - Land: 1.22 sq mi (3.15 km^{2})
  - Water: 0 sq mi (0.00 km^{2})
- Elevation: 1,496 ft (456 m)

Population (2020)
  - Total: 1,517
  - Density: 1,247.1/sq mi (481.49/km^{2})
- Time zone: UTC-5 (Eastern (EST))
  - Summer (DST): UTC-4 (EDT)
- ZIP code: 14727
- Area code: 585
- FIPS code: 36-19356
- GNIS feature ID: 0947911
- Website: www.cubany.gov

Cuba is a village in Allegany County, New York, United States. The population was 1,575 at the 2010 census. The village is in the western part of the town of Cuba at the junction of Routes 305 and 446 on Oil Creek.

== History ==
An early missionary mentioned a native oil spring at this location. The village of Cuba was incorporated in 1850.

The Cuba Cemetery, Main Street Historic District, and South Street Historic District are listed on the National Register of Historic Places.

== Geography ==
Cuba is located at 42°13′06″N 78°16′31″W. The village is entirely within Allegany County, just east of the border with Cattaraugus County.

According to the United States Census Bureau, the village has a total area of 1.22 square miles (3.15 km^{2}). None of the area is covered with water, except for several narrow streams which pass through the village. Cuba Lake, a large water body, is two miles (3 km) north of the village.

The Southern Tier Expressway (Interstate 86 and New York State Highway 17) passes through the north side of the village, with access from Exit 28. NY Route 446 runs parallel to the Southern Tier Expressway. NY Route 305 is an important north-south trunk road passing through the village. Cuba is located on the Main Line of the Western New York and Pennsylvania Railroad.

North Cuba and South Cuba are small communities respectively north and south of the village on Route 305.

== Points of interest ==
=== South Street Historic District ===
The South Street Historic District encompasses a four block, one-quarter-mile-long (0.40 km) section of South Street (Route 305), the main north-south route through the village. The street is one of the village's most prestigious residential areas. It was added to the State and National Historic Registers in 1988.

=== Story Block Building ===
In the historic district, the Story Block building was built by James Story in 1876 and is currently being renovated.

=== Liberty Pole ===
A 150-foot-tall (46 m) flag pole with a 28 by 38 feet (8.5 by 11.6 m) flag flies on main street. The pole was erected in August 2009 by the U.S. Flag Company of Beaumont, Texas and only one other pole east of the Mississippi, located in Baltimore, Maryland, is as tall. It was dedicated with a flag raising on September 11, 2009. Before its arrival in Cuba, the flag flew over the Capitol Dome in Washington, D.C.

=== Mill Street Walking Bridge ===
The Mill Street Walking Bridge is a walking bridge Connecting the intersection of Mill ST. and Willow ST. to the intersection of Mill ST. And Orchard ST. by Crossing Griffin Creek.

== Demographics ==
Historical population
Census	Pop.	Note	%±
1880	1,251		—
1890	1,386		10.8%
1900	1,502		8.4%
1910	1,556		3.6%
1920	1,611		3.5%
1930	1,422		−11.7%
1940	1,699		19.5%
1950	1,783		4.9%
1960	1,949		9.3%
1970	1,735		−11.0%
1980	1,739		0.2%
1990	1,690		−2.8%
2000	1,633		−3.4%
2010	1,575		−3.6%
2020	1,517		−3.7%
U.S. Decennial Census

As of the census of 2000, there were 1,633 people, 636 households, and 410 families residing in the village. The population density was 1,369.0 inhabitants per square mile (528.6/km^{2}). There were 698 housing units at an average density of 585.1 per square mile (225.9/km^{2}). The racial makeup of the village was 97.31% White, 0.55% Black or African American, 0.24% Native American, 0.55% Asian, 0.31% from other races, and 1.04% from two or more races. Hispanic or Latino of any race were 1.78% of the population.

There were 636 households, out of which 33.6% had children under the age of 18 living with them, 44.7% were married couples living together, 14.2% had a female householder with no husband present, and 35.4% were non-families. 28.1% of all households were made up of individuals, and 13.4% had someone living alone who was 65 years of age or older. The average household size was 2.47 and the average family size was 3.02.

In the village, the population was spread out, with 27.1% under the age of 18, 8.4% from 18 to 24, 25.5% from 25 to 44, 21.7% from 45 to 64, and 17.3% who were 65 years of age or older. The median age was 38 years. For every 100 females, there were 83.9 males. For every 100 females age 18 and over, there were 76.8 males.

The median income for a household in the village was $30,682, and the median income for a family was $34,879. Males had a median income of $30,682 versus $22,083 for females. The per capita income for the village was $14,594. About 9.6% of families and 12.9% of the population were below the poverty line, including 12.0% of those under age 18 and 10.4% of those age 65 or over.
