= Alumni Hall (Alfred, New York) =

- U.S. National Register of Historic Places
- New York State Register of Historic Places
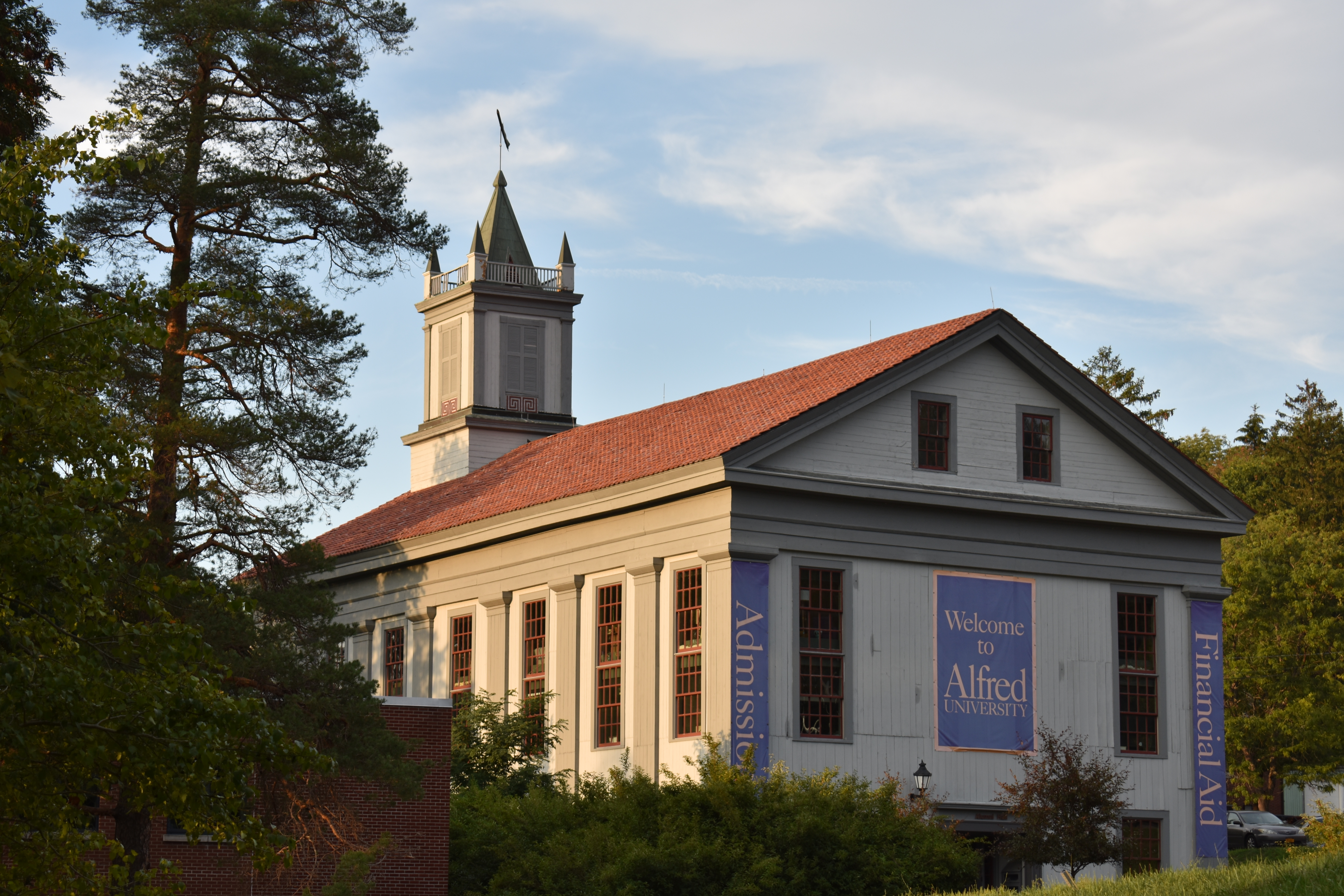
- Alumni Hall as seen from the southwest, 2022

- Location within New York Location within the United States
- Location: Alfred University, Alfred, New York
- Coordinates: 42°15′11″N 77°47′16″W
- Area: less than one acre
- Built: 1851
- Architect: Maxwell Stillman Jr.
- Architectural style: Greek Revival
- NRHP reference No.: 85002389
- NYSRHP No.: 00341.000005

Significant dates
- Added to NRHP: September 12, 1985
- Designated NYSRHP: August 7, 1985

Alumni Hall, also known as Chapel Hall, is a historic multipurpose building located on the campus of Alfred University at Alfred in Allegany County, New York. It is a large frame structure built in 1851–1852 with what has been described as Alfred's most important Greek Revival features. The three-story, 52-foot-wide (16 m) by 102-foot-long (31 m) rectangular structure has a red clay tile roof. Designed and built by Maxwell Stillman Jr., it features a one of a kind 12 foot pine weathervane in the shape of a quill pen. It was the fourth structure built for the Alfred Academy and housed a chapel, auditorium and lecture, recitation, library and lyceum rooms for college and community use. It is now used primarily to house the Admissions Department.

It was listed on the National Register of Historic Places in 1985.

== Gallery ==
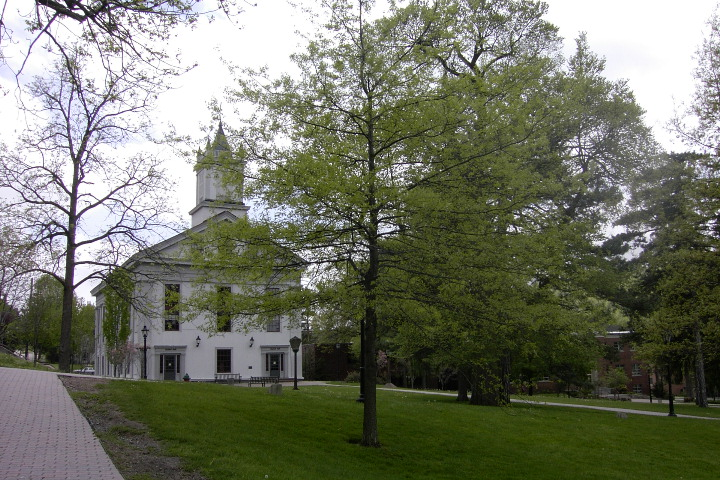
Alumni Hall in 2004

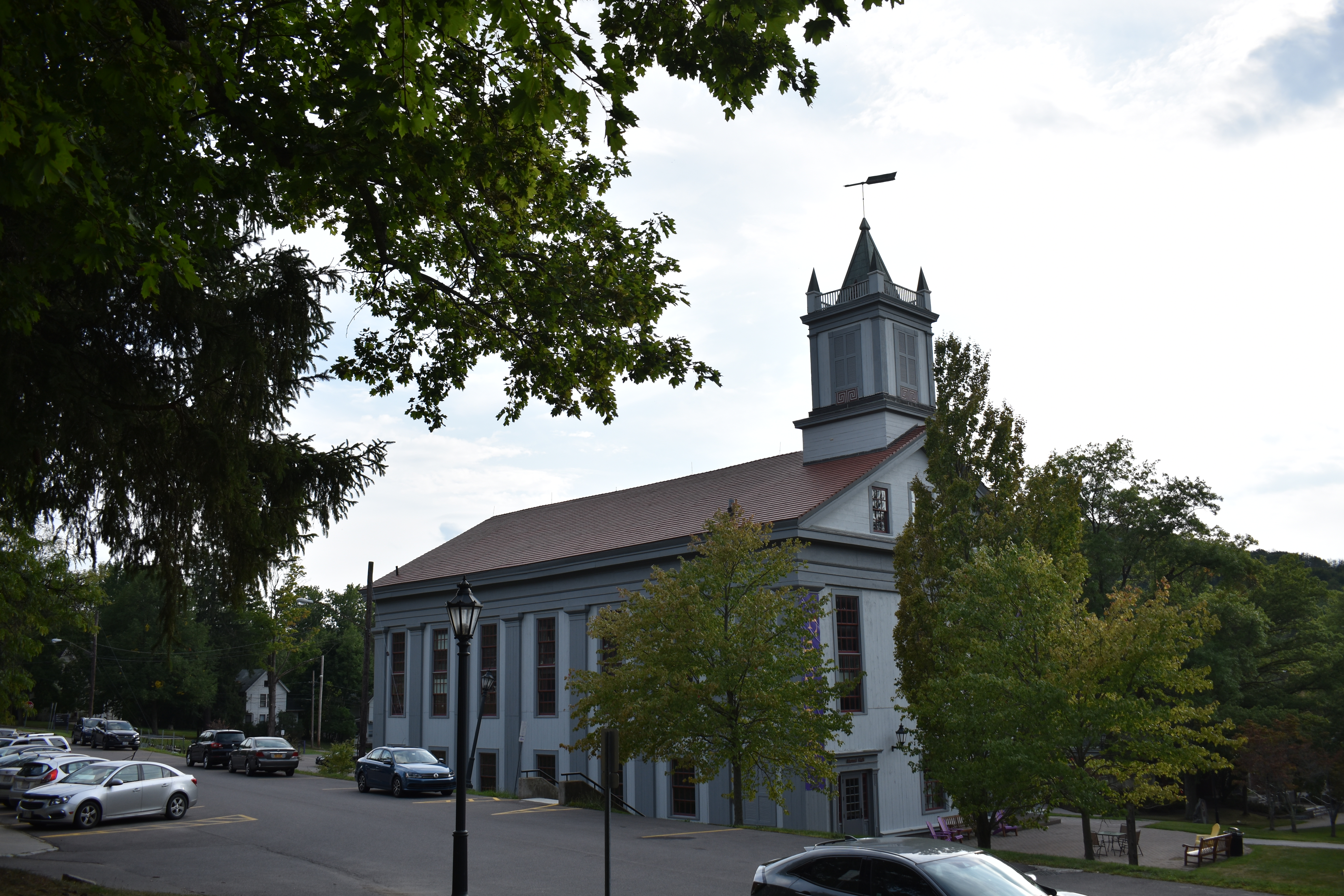
Alumni Hall in 2022
