= Cuba, New York =

- Town
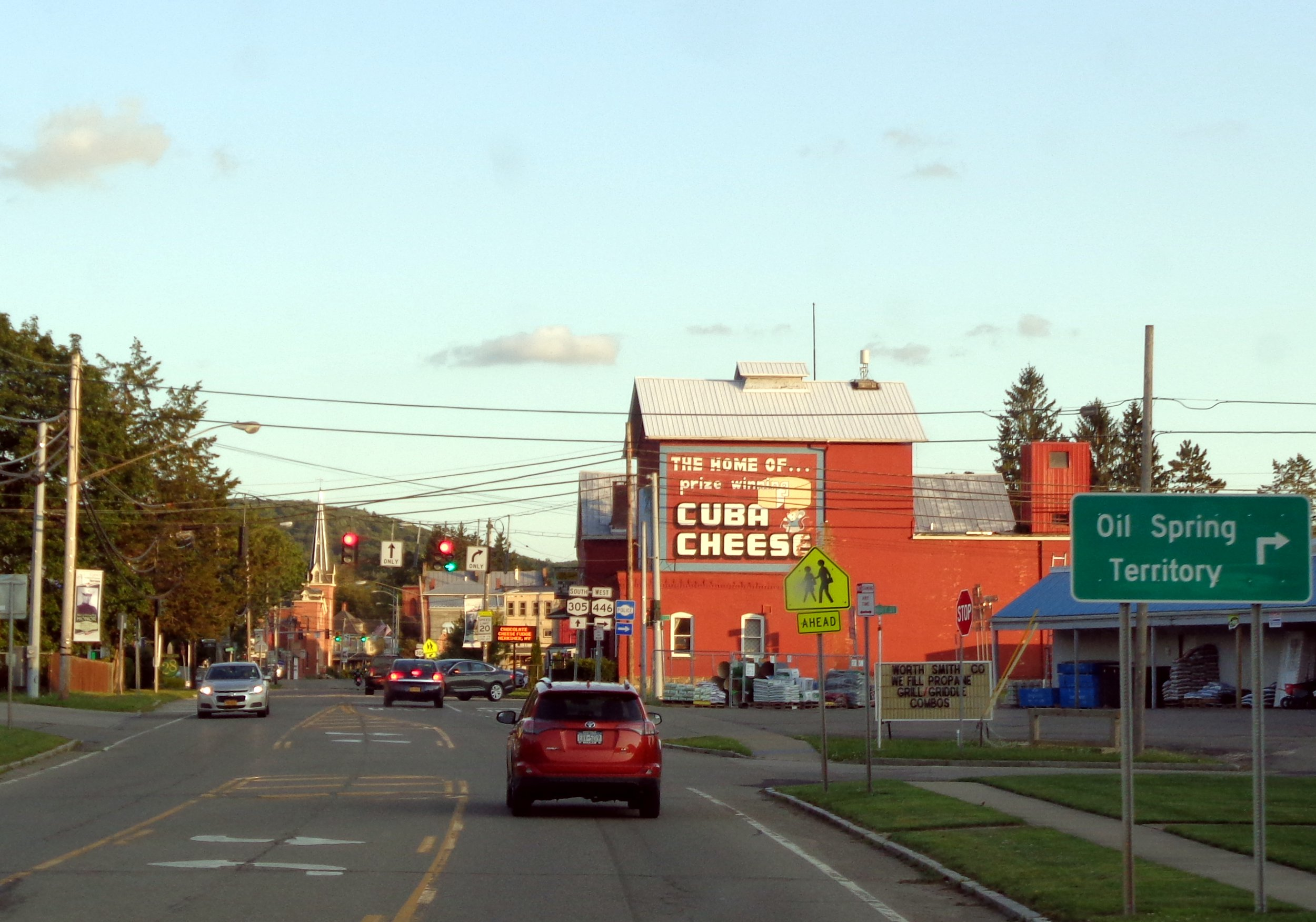
- Town center along Genesee Street

- Location of Cuba in New York Cuba (the United States)
- Coordinates: 42°13′04″N 78°16′31″W
- Country: United States
- State: New York
- County: Allegany

Government
  - Type: Town Council
  - Town Supervisor: Lee James (R)
  - Town Council: Members: • Melodie Farwell (R); • Michael Mosgrove (R); • Bill Beck (R); • Jonathan Enzinna (D)

Area
  - Total: 35.80 sq mi (92.73 km^{2})
  - Land: 35.10 sq mi (90.91 km^{2})
  - Water: 0.70 sq mi (1.82 km^{2})

Population (2020)
  - Total: 3,126
  - Estimate (2022): 3,102
  - Density: 89.1/sq mi (34.39/km^{2})
- Time zone: UTC-5 (Eastern (EST))
  - Summer (DST): UTC-4 (EDT)
- ZIP Codes: 14727 (Cuba); 14739 (Friendship); 14714 (Black Creek)
- FIPS code: 36-003-19367
- Website: www.cubany.gov

Cuba is a town on the western border of Allegany County, New York, United States. The village of Cuba lies within its borders. The federally recognized tribe of Seneca Native Americans has a reservation on the western town line. As of the 2020 Census, the total population was 3,154.

== Geography ==
According to the United States Census Bureau, the town has a total area of 35.8 square miles (93 km^{2}), of which 35.1 square miles (91 km^{2}) is land and 0.7 square miles (1.8 km^{2}) (1.95%) is water.

The west town line is the border of Cattaraugus County.

The Southern Tier Expressway (I-86 and NY 17) pass through the town, running east–west. NY 305 is a major north–south highway that intersects NY 446 in the village of Cuba.

Cuba is on the main line of the Western New York & Pennsylvania Railroad, which operates the former Erie Railroad between Hornell, New York and Meadville, Pennsylvania.

=== Communities and locations in the town of Cuba ===
- Black Creek – A former community in the town, now in the town of New Hudson. Black Creek is mentioned often in the early history of the town.
- Cuba – A village in the western part of the town.
- Cuba Lake – A lake in the northwest corner of the town.
- North Cuba – A hamlet north of Cuba village on Route 305.
- Oil Springs Creek – A stream passing through the Village of Cuba.
- Oil Springs Reservation – A reservation of the Seneca at the western town line.
- South Cuba – A hamlet south of Cuba village on Route 305.
- Seymour – A former community in the town located near North Cuba.
- Summit – A location east of Cuba village on County Road 20 (Cuba-Friendship Road), also called "Cuba Summit".
- Tannery Creek – A stream flowing across the town and through Cuba village.

=== Adjacent towns ===
Cuba is north of the town of Clarksville and south of the town of New Hudson. It is east of the town of Ischua in Cattaraugus County and west of the town of Friendship.

=== Etymology ===
John S. Minard's Civic History of Cuba, published in 1910, states:

"Cuba is a Roman word and means Goddess or Protector of the Young. So in all probability, the Legislators of 1822, when they set aside the township from the town of Friendship, by accident, stumbled upon the word and appropriated the name, the significance of which is pleasant to think of."

Simeon DeWitt, the surveyor general for New York State in the early 19th century, was an avid student of ancient Roman mythology and is credited with suggesting the name.

Though it may seem that the town was named after the island of Cuba, this is not the case. A common reason for this perception is the prevalence of other towns in the area with names of Spanish cities or towns, such as Salamanca, Panama, and Bolivar.

== Demographics ==
Historical population
Census	Pop.	Note	%±
1830	1,059		—
1840	1,768		66.9%
1850	2,243		26.9%
1860	2,187		−2.5%
1870	2,397		9.6%
1880	2,203		−8.1%
1890	2,328		5.7%
1900	2,369		1.8%
1910	2,431		2.6%
1920	2,395		−1.5%
1930	2,256		−5.8%
1940	2,507		11.1%
1950	2,784		11.0%
1960	3,116		11.9%
1970	3,165		1.6%
1980	3,428		8.3%
1990	3,401		−0.8%
2000	3,392		−0.3%
2010	3,243		−4.4%
2020	3,154		−2.7%
2022 (est.)	3,102	▼	−1.6%
U.S. Decennial Census

As of the census of 2000, there were 3,392 people, 1,336 households, and 915 families residing in the town. The population density was 96.6 inhabitants per square mile (37.3/km^{2}). There were 1,710 housing units at an average density of 48.7 per square mile (18.8/km^{2}). The racial makeup of the town was 97.91% White, 0.27% Black or African American, 0.24% Native American, 0.38% Asian, 0.27% from other races, and 0.94% from two or more races. Hispanic or Latino of any race were 1.09% of the population.

There were 1,336 households, out of which 31.7% had children under the age of 18 living with them, 53.4% were married couples living together, 9.8% had a female householder with no husband present, and 31.5% were non-families. 25.1% of all households were made up of individuals, and 11.8% had someone living alone who was 65 years of age or older. The average household size was 2.49 and the average family size was 2.98.

In the town, the population was spread out, with 25.7% under the age of 18, 7.7% from 18 to 24, 25.3% from 25 to 44, 24.7% from 45 to 64, and 16.6% who were 65 years of age or older. The median age was 40 years. For every 100 females, there were 92.7 males. For every 100 females age 18 and over, there were 87.4 males.

The median income for a household in the town was $33,939, and the median income for a family was $37,969. Males had a median income of $29,291 versus $21,115 for females. The per capita income for the town was $17,247. About 6.0% of families and 9.4% of the population were below the poverty line, including 8.6% of those under age 18 and 6.3% of those age 65 or over.

== History ==
The Town of Cuba was formed in 1822 from part of the town of Friendship. In 1830, Cuba was reduced by the formation of the town of Genesee. In 1835, Cuba was partitioned again to form the town of Clarksville.

Formerly known as Township 3 Range 2 of the Holland Land Purchase, the settlement of Cuba began in 1817, and the town was separated in 1822, and a village incorporated in 1850. Between 1810 and the late 1820s the place saw a boom in both settlement and population as many of the town's first businesses, churches and schools were established.

== Business ==
=== Cheese ===
Starting in the 1870s, Cuba was a notable cheese producing town in New York. Its location on railroads and canals provided access to New York City and other markets, creating a role in setting the price of cheese across the nation. In the early 20th century, Cuba was known as the "Cheese Capital of the World". Production of "Cuba Cheese" moved to neighboring Olean, New York in the early 2020s, but a retail operation started in 1975, Cuba Cheese Shoppe, was divested in 1991 and remains at the location of the original cheese plant on Genesee Street.

== Points of interest ==
=== Cuba Lake ===
Cuba Lake is a man-made lake located about two miles (3.2 km) north of the village at 1,542 feet (470 m) above sea level. It is the highest reservoir in Allegany County and the sixth-highest in western New York State. It was constructed in 1858 at a cost of $150,000, as a reservoir to feed the Genesee Valley Canal. At the time of its construction, Cuba Lake was the largest man-made lake in the world. The lake contains many game fish including bass, walleye, and northern pike.

Today, the lake mainly serves as a source of recreation for locals. It is surrounded by over 300 homes, many of which are year-round dwellings. The road surrounding the lake is about seven miles (11 km) in length and very narrow.

=== The Seneca Oil Spring ===
The Seneca Oil Spring is located near the spillway end of Cuba Lake on the Oil Springs Reservation in Allegany County. This is the site of a famed spring described by the Franciscan Missionary Joseph de La Roche Daillon in 1627, the first recorded mention of oil on the North American Continent. In 1927, the New York State Oil Producers Association sponsored the dedication of a monument at the site describing the history of the oil industry in North America. The site is now under the supervision of Allegany County and a picnic area is available for those visiting there.

=== McKinney Stables ===
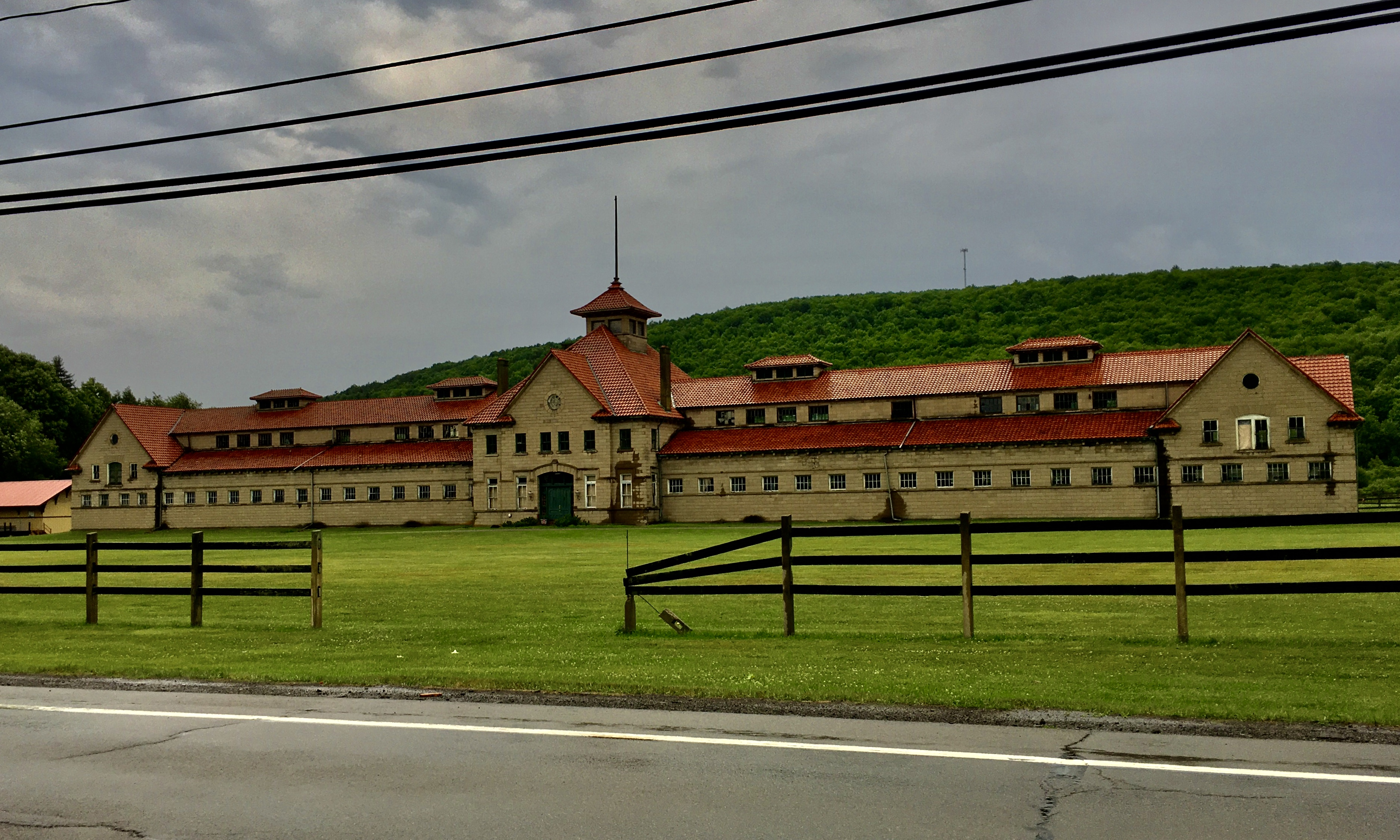
The McKinney Stables

Cuba is also home to the McKinney Stables of Empire City Farms, which the locals call the Block Barn, on Route 305 south of the Historic District. Constructed in 1909, this structure, which is made almost entirely of cement, is nearly 350 feet (110 m) long and is completely fireproof. It was built to house William Simpson's "McKinney" horses. It has been a popular stable and the Czar of Russia sent a mare there to be mated with "Mckinney". It was once considered by the Anheuser Busch company as a spot to house its famous Clydesdales. Each year in September it hosts the Cuba Garlic Festival.

The stables were listed on the National Register of Historic Places in 1999.

== Education ==
=== Local schools ===
The main high school in Cuba is Cuba-Rushford Middle High School, which formed after a merger of the Cuba and Rushford school districts. The Middle High School sits north of the town on Route 305 and teaches grades 6-12. What is known as the "Old" High School on Elm Street now teaches grades K-5; the "Old" Elementary School across the street is now the Elm Street Academy, part of a BOCES program. The mascot of Cuba was the Greyhounds until the merger in the mid-1990s when the mascot was renamed to the Rebels. The old Rebel's mascot resembled Yosemite Sam, with slight variations in the character design in order to avoid copyright. Due to controversy with the old Rebel resembling a Confederate soldier, the school changed the mascot to a Grey Tiger. Cuba-Rushford sports teams are still referred to as the Rebels.

=== Higher education ===
West of Cuba, between the village of Allegany and the city of Olean, is St. Bonaventure University (SBU); SBU's campus is located on the Olean/Allegany border. Some of SBU's teams, such as the basketball and baseball teams, play in the Atlantic 10 Conference of NCAA Division I.

Several of the State University of New York campuses are near Cuba. Olean is home to a Jamestown Community College satellite campus. About 30 miles (48 km) east of Cuba in Alfred are Alfred University and Alfred State College. About 20 miles (32 km) north of Cuba, in Houghton, is Houghton College.

== Churches ==
- Cuba First Baptist Church
- Christ Church (Episcopal)
- Cuba United Methodist Church
- Our Lady of Angels (Catholic)
- North Park Wesleyan Church
- The Church Project

== Cemeteries ==
Code numbers refer to the Allegany County Cemetery Index card file at the Allegany County.

- Cemetery - code 15-1; (Town 3, Range 2HC, lot 45), Cuba Village
- Cemetery - code 15-2; (lot 54), Witter Road
- Cemetery - code 15-3; (lot 45), Cuba Village
- Catholic Cemetery - code 15-4; (lot 45), Cuba Village
- North Cuba Cemetery - code 15-5; (lot 47), near Cuba Dam
- Cemetery - code 15-6; near Cuba Lake

== Notable people ==
- Charles Edwin "Charley" Ackerly, born in Cuba, Olympic gold medal for wrestling, 1920 Summer Olympics in Antwerp, Belgium.
- Calvin T. Chamberlain, brigadier general of the New York State Militia, member of the New York State Assembly and New York State Senate.
- Joseph Hupp, chemist
- Charles Ingalls, father of Laura Ingalls Wilder
- William F. Lynch, US Army brigadier general, lived in Cuba
- William Orton, President of Western Union.
- James Burton Pond, prominent abolitionist and American Civil War recipient of the Medal of Honor.
- Edward B. Vreeland, born in Cuba, politician and U.S. Representative.

== See also ==
- Cuba Lake Raceway
