= Rushford =

Rushford may refer to:

== Places ==
=== United Kingdom ===
- Rushford, Devon, a United Kingdom location
- Rushford, Norfolk
- Rushford, Warwickshire

=== United States ===
- Rushford, Minnesota
- Rushford, New York, a town
  - Rushford (CDP), New York, the central settlement in the town
- Rushford, Wisconsin
