= Augustus Buchel =

Confederate States Army officer (1813–1864)

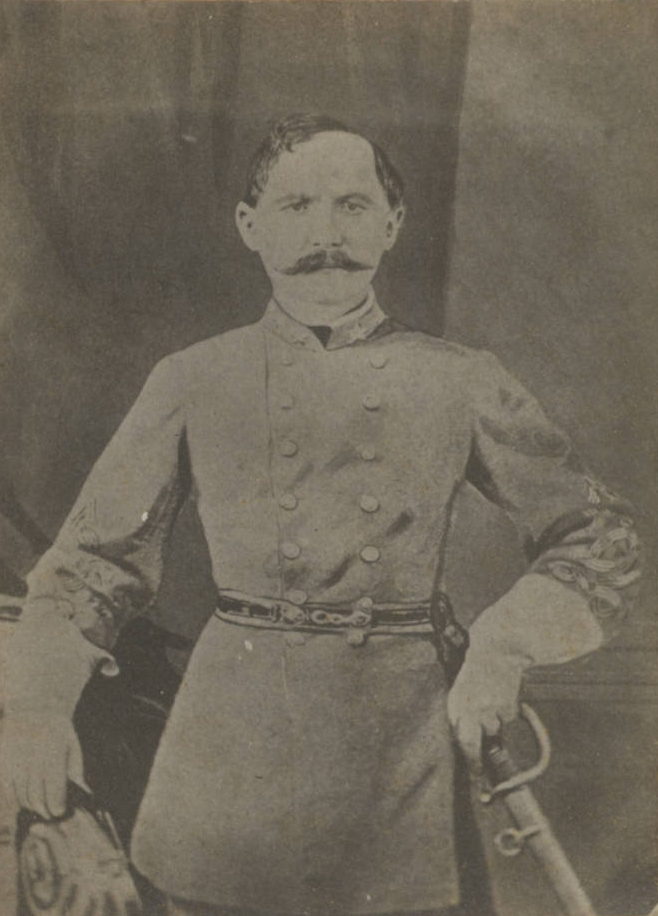
- Buchel in uniform, c. 1862
- Born: Augustus Carl Büchel; October 8, 1813; Guntersblum, Mont-Tonnerre, France (present-day Guntersblum, Germany)
- Died: April 12, 1864 (aged 50); Mansfield, Louisiana, C.S.
- Burial place: Texas State Cemetery, Austin, Texas, U.S.
- Education: École Militaire
- Military career
- Allegiance: Hesse-Darmstadt; Ottoman Empire; United States; Confederate States
- Branch: Hesse-Darmstadt Army; Ottoman Army; United States Volunteers; Confederate States Army
- Service years: 1846–1847; 1861–1864
- Rank: Second Lieutenant (Hesse); Colonel (Ottoman Empire); Captain (U.S.); Colonel (C.S.)
- Units: Life Guard Regiment; Company H, 1st Texas Foot Riflemen 3d Texas Infantry Regiment
- Commands: 1st Texas Cavalry Regiment
- Battles: First Carlist War; Battle of Huesca; Mexican–American War; Battle of Buena Vista; American Civil War; Battle of Mansfield; Battle of Pleasant Hill (DOW)

Augustus Carl Büchel (October 8, 1813 – April 12, 1864) was a German-born senior officer of the Confederate States Army, commanding the 1st Texas Cavalry Regiment in the Trans-Mississippi Theater of the American Civil War from 1863 until he died of wounds received at the Battle of Pleasant Hill, Louisiana, in 1864.

Born in Guntersblum, Mont-Tonnerre, France (present-day Guntersblum, Germany), in 1813, Buchel attended several military academies in his early life, including the École Militaire in Paris, and he served in the French Foreign Legion in the early 1800s. Following his participation in the First Carlist War, he became an instructor in the Ottoman Army, where he may have earned the honorary title of Pasha.

In 1845, he emigrated to Port Lavaca, Texas, and served in the United States Army during the Mexican–American War, including as aide-de-camp to future U.S. President Zachary Taylor. At the outbreak of the American Civil War, Buchel sided with the Confederacy and served as an officer primarily in Texas. By 1863, he had become colonel of his own cavalry regiment and was fought in the Red River Campaign, where he participated in the Battle of Pleasant Hill.

Buchel was mortally wounded in the Battle of Pleasant Hill and died several days later. He was later interred at the Texas State Cemetery, where a large stone memorial was erected in his honor. Additionally, Buchel County, an unorganized county that existed in the late 1800s, was named in his honor. Writing on him in 1940, historian Ella Lonn called him "[a] citizen of the Confederacy but a soldier of fortune if ever there was one!"

== Early life and career ==
Büchel was born in the Rhinelander town of Guntersblum, Mont-Tonnerre, France (present-day Guntersblum, Germany), on October 8, 1813. At the age of 14, he was enrolled at a local military academy, (Note: Sources seem to differ slightly, with Buchel's entry in the Handbook of Texas stating that he attended "the military academy at Darmstadt", while a 1940 historical book by historian Ella Lonn states that he attended "the military academy of Mayence".) and at the age of 18, he was commissioned as a second lieutenant of volunteers in the 1st Infantry Regiment (Life Guard Regiment) of the Hesse-Darmstadt Army. He later furthered his military training at the École militaire in Paris, after which he became a lieutenant in the French Foreign Legion. Büchel would serve in several national armies during his lifetime, and by the time of his death would be fluent in seven different languages.

At the outbreak of the First Carlist War, he joined on the side of Maria Christina of the Two Sicilies. In 1837, he participated in the Battle of Huesca and the following year he was knighted by Maria Christina for his actions during the battle, being awarded the honor of the Cross of the Order of Golden Crosses. Following the war, Büchel, at the recommendation of Ali Pasha, served as an instructor in the Ottoman Army during which time he rose to the rank of colonel. As a Christian, this was the highest rank he could attain, and while he was offered the rank of general if he converted to Islam, he declined and resigned from his post, later returning to Germany. There is some evidence that he was awarded the title of Pasha while an instructor.

In late 1845, Büchel emigrated with the Adelsverein to Port Lavaca, Texas, where he settled in the town of Indianola and dropped the umlaut from his last name, which became Buchel. His emigration from Germany may have been due to his killing of a man in a duel, as Buchel had a reputation for dueling.

== Mexican–American War ==
In May 1846, after United States Army General Zachary Taylor called for volunteers to fight in the Mexican–American War, Buchel raised a company in the 1st Texas Foot Riflemen. Buchel would serve as the company's captain and was later promoted to the rank of major. During the Battle of Buena Vista, Buchel served as Taylor's aide-de-camp, and he was later recognized for his bravery during the battle. Following the war, U.S. President Franklin Pierce named Buchel as the customs collector for Port Lavaca, Texas, and Buchel also engaged in business dealings in Corpus Christi. During the Crimean War, Buchel led a company, and during the Cortina Troubles in 1859, Buchel organized volunteers in Indianola, though they never saw military action.

== American Civil War ==
At the beginning of the American Civil War, Buchel sided with the Confederacy and joined the Texas Militia. By late 1861, Buchel was promoted to lieutenant colonel in the 3d Texas Infantry Regiment (also known as Luckett's regiment) and was stationed in South Texas. However, in 1863, Buchel became the colonel for the 1st Texas Cavalry Regiment and participated in military action along the Texas Gulf Coast, patrolling the land between the San Bernard River and the Caney Creek.

The regiment was later relocated to Louisiana due to the possibility of an American invasion of Texas through that state. In early 1864, Buchel was appointed as a brigadier general, though this appointment was never confirmed. On April 9, 1864, Buchel led his troops in the Battle of Pleasant Hill, during which he was mortally wounded. He was taken to nearby Mansfield, Louisiana, where he died several days later on April 12. (Note: Sources differ slightly on the exact date of Buchel's death. According to the Handbook of Texas, the commonly accepted date of his death is April 15, though Buchel's commander Hamilton P. Bee stated in his official report of the battle that Buchel had died on April 11. Additionally, a 1940 historical book by historian Ella Lonn states that he died "four days" after the battle, giving a death date of April 13.) Buchel was initially buried in Mansfield, but later a detachment from his regiment relocated his remains to the Texas State Cemetery in the state's capital of Austin. A memorial was held at the cemetery and a eulogy was given by Texas Lieutenant Governor Fletcher Stockdale.

== Honors ==
Location of Buchel County in Texas

Buchel was not married and had no heirs at the time of his death. At his burial site, the state of Texas erected a large stone memorial. In 1887, the Texas Legislature passed an act creating Buchel County in the western portion of the state, named in his honor. However, the county was never formally organized and by 1897, it was absorbed into Brewster County.

Writing on Buchel in 1940, historian Ella Lonn said the following: "He was described as a quiet, unassuming man, and though apparently a secessionist, not nearly so violent as his superior, Luckett. A citizen of the Confederacy but a soldier of fortune if ever there was one!" In 1965, the University of Texas at Austin acquired a number of historical documents pertaining to Buchel as part of an 800-document collection.
