= Ghost Lake (disambiguation) =

Ghost Lake is a man-made reservoir in the Rocky Mountain foothills in Alberta, Canada.

Ghost Lake may also refer to:

== Geography ==
- Ghost Lake, Alberta, a summer village by the lake in Alberta
- Ghost Lake, several lakes in Ontario, Canada
- Ghost Lake, a lake near Bhimeshwar, Nepal
- Ghost Lake, a lake in Carbon County, Montana, United States
- Ghost Lake, a man-made lake near Shades of Death Road in Warren County, New Jersey, United States
- Ghost Lake, several lakes in Wisconsin, United States

== Entertainment ==
- Ghost Lake, an amusement at Conneaut Lake Park
- Ghost Lake, a 1955 Taiwanese film directed by Joseph Kuo
- Ghost Lake, or Shockers: Ghost Lake, a 1994 novel by John Peel
- Ghost Lake, a 2004 American film filmed at Rushford Lake
