= 23rd Illinois Infantry Regiment =

23rd Regiment Illinois Infantry Regiment, U.S. Volunteers; "The First Irish"
- Illinois state flag
- Active: June 15, 1861, to July 24, 1865
- Country: United States
- Allegiance: Union
- Branch: Infantry
- Engagements: Siege of Lexington (surrendered); Relief of Clarksburg; Relief of Parkersburg; Relief of Moorefield; Pursuit of Lee; Hedgesville and Back Creek; Kanawha Valley; Hampshire and Hardy Counties, West Virginia; Scout to Moorefield; Raid on Baltimore and Ohio Railroad; Sheridan's Shenandoah Valley Campaign; Second Battle of Kernstown; Third Battle of Winchester; Siege of Petersburg; Assault on Ft Gregg-Fall of Petersburg; Appomattox Campaign; Surrender of the Army of Northern Virginia

The 23rd Illinois Volunteer Infantry Regiment, known as the "First Irish" or "Irish 'Brigade'", was an infantry regiment that served in the Union Army during the American Civil War.

The 23rd Illinois Infantry was organized at Chicago, Illinois and mustered into Federal service on June 15, 1861.

Initially assigned to garrison the town of Lexington, Missouri, the regiment surrendered to a much larger force of pro-secession Missouri State Guard commanded by State Guard Major General Sterling Price at the Siege of Lexington in September 1861. After being paroled, General John C. Fremont (commanding the Department of Missouri) had the 23rd Illinois mustered out of service, but in December General George McClellan (now supreme commander in chief of all Union armies) had it restored.

After being reconstituted, the regiment left camp in the spring of 1862 for western Virginia, where it spent most of the rest of the war stationed there. In 1864, it joined General Philip Sheridan's army in the Valley Campaign. At the end of the year, the 23rd headed to the Richmond area for the Siege of Petersburg and was present at Appomattox.

The regiment was mustered out on July 24, 1865.

== Service ==
Organized at Chicago, Ill., and mustered on June 15, 1861. Moved to Quincy, Ill., July 14, thence to St. Louis, Mo., and to Jefferson City July 21, and duty there until September 8. March to Lexington September 8–11. Siege of Lexington September 12–20. Captured by Price September 20 and paroled. Regiment mustered out by order of General Fremont October 8, 1861, but restored by order of General McClellan, December 10, 1861. Reassembled at Chicago and guard prisoners at Camp Douglas until June 14, 1862. Moved to Harper's Ferry, West Va., June 14. Attached to R. R. District, Mountain Department, Harper's Ferry and New Creek to July, 1862. R. R. District, 8th Army Corps, Middle Department, to September, 1862. R. R. District West Va. to January, 1863. New Creek, Va., Defenses Upper Potomac, 8th Army Corps, Middle Department, to March, 1863. 5th Brigade, 1st Division, 8th Army Corps, to June, 1863. Mulligan's Brigade, Scammon's Division Dept. of West Virginia to December, 1863. 2nd Brigade, 2nd Division, West Virginia, to April, 1864. Kelly's Command, Reserve Division, West Virginia, to July, 1864. 1st Brigade, 3rd Infantry, Division West Virginia, to July, 1864. 3rd Brigade, 1st Infantry Division, West Virginia, to December, 1864. 2nd Brigade, Independent Division, 24th Army Corps, Army of the James, to June, 1865. 1st Brigade, Independent Division, 24th Army Corps, to July, 1865.

== Detailed Service (after reconstitution) ==
Duty at New Creek, West Va., until April, 1863. Relief of Clarksburg, W. Va., September 1, 1862. Relief of Parkersburg September 3. Action at Moorefield, South Fork of the Potomac, November 9 (Cos. "B," "D," "K"). Relief of Colonel Washburn at Moorefield January 3–4, 1863. Moved to Grafton April 25, 1863. Skirmish at Greenland Gap April 25 (Co. "G"). Phillippi April 26. Altamont April 26 (Detachment). Rowlesburg April 28 (Cos. "B," "F," "I"). Fairmont April 29 (Co. "K"). Pursuit of Lee July, 1863. Hedgesville and Back Creek July 6. At Petersburg, W. Va., August 16. Petersburg Gap September 4. South Fork September 11 (Co. "I"). Moorefield November 8–9. Demonstration from Kanawha Valley, W. Va., December 8–25. Operations In Hampshire and Hardy Counties December 31, 1863, to January 5, 1864, and January 27 to February 7. Medley January 29–30. Regiment veteranize at New Creek April, 1864, and on furlough until June. Scout to Moorefield February 21–22 (Detachment). Raid on Baltimore & Ohio Railroad between Bloomfield and Piedmont May 5 (Non-Veterans). Leetown July 3. Operations about Harper's Ferry July 4–7. Bolivar Heights July 4–6. Maryland Heights July 6–7. Snicker's Ferry July 17–18 and July 20. Kernstown (or Winchester) July 24. Medley July 30. Sheridan's Shenandoah Valley Campaign August 7 to November 28. Cedar Creek August 12. Winchester August 17. Halltown August 22–23. Berryville September 3. Battle of Winchester September 19. Fisher's Hill September 22. Duty In the Shenandoah Valley until December. Moved to Petersburg front December 30. Siege operations against Petersburg and Richmond January to April, 1865. Duty in trenches before Richmond and on the Bermuda Hundred front until March 27. Moved to Hatcher's Run March 27–28. Appomattox Campaign March 28-April 9. Hatcher's Run March 30–31 and April 1. Assault on Fort Gregg and fall of Petersburg April 2. Pursuit of Lee April 3–9. Appomattox Court House April 9. Surrender of Lee and his army. Duty in the Department of Virginia until July. Mustered out at Richmond, Va., July 24, and discharged at Chicago, Ill., July 30, 1865.

== Total strength and casualties ==
The regiment suffered 4 officers and 50 enlisted men who were killed in action or who died of their wounds and 2 officers and 93 enlisted men who died of disease, for a total of 149 fatalities.

== Commanders ==
- Colonel James A. Mulligan – killed in action July 24, 1864.
- Lieutenant Colonel Samuel Simison – mustered out with the regiment.

== Notable members ==
- William F. Lynch – regimental sergeant major from June to September 1861, later commanded the 58th Illinois Infantry Regiment

== See also ==
- List of Illinois Civil War Units
- Illinois in the American Civil War
