= Senator Yager =

Senator Yager may refer to:

- Ken Yager (born 1947), Tennessee state senator
- William Overall Yager (1833–1904), Virginia state senator
