= John Leax =

American poet, essayist, and writer

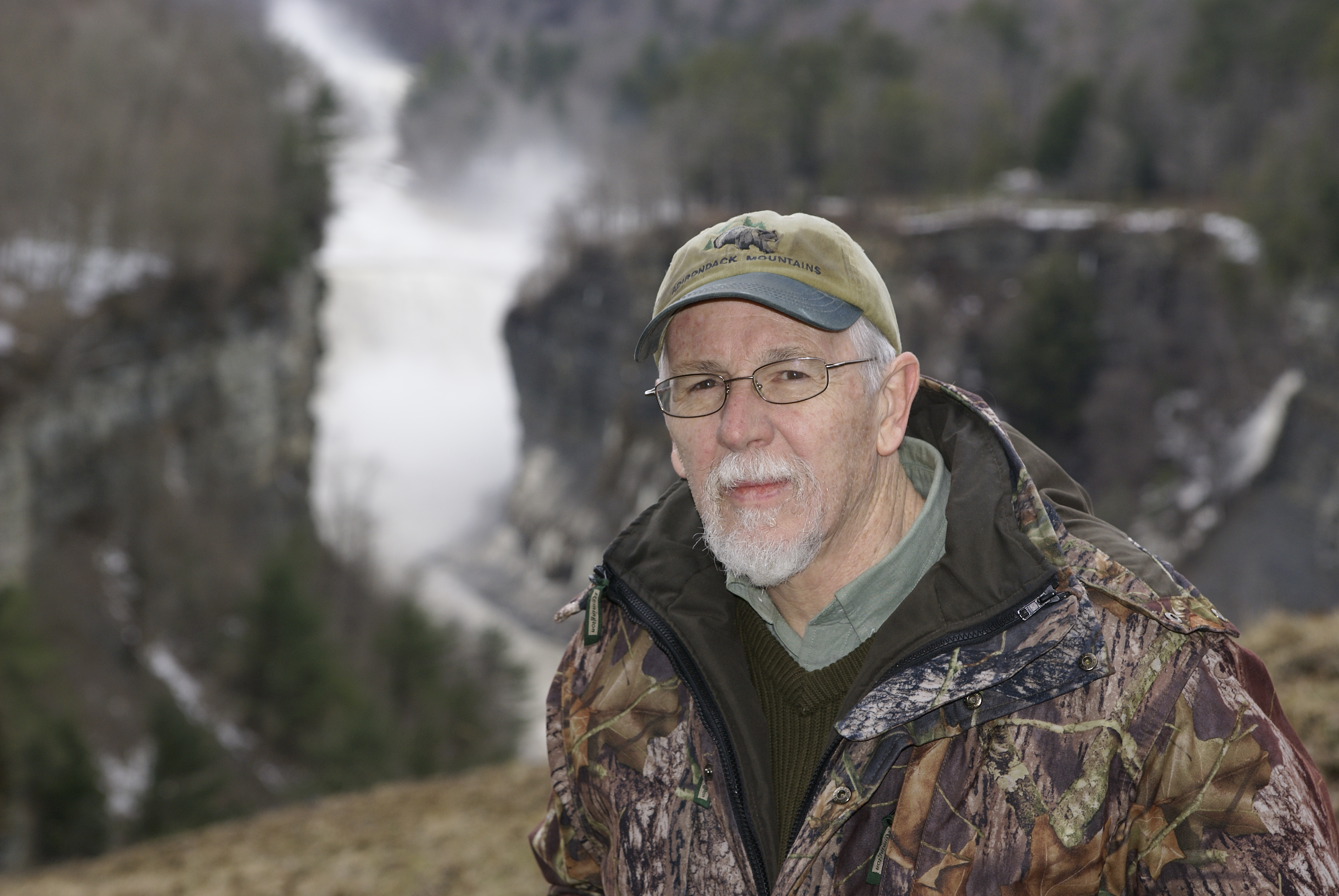
John Leax

John R. Leax, known as Jack, was an American poet, essayist, and fiction writer. He was professor of English and poet-in-residence at Houghton College in Houghton, New York from 1968 until his retirement in 2009. His poems, articles, and fiction have been widely published in periodicals and anthologies. Born in Turtle Creek, Pennsylvania on July 12, 1943, Jack died at Roswell Park Comprehensive Cancer Center on September 1, 2024.

His books of poetry include "Remembering Jesus" (2014), "Recluse Freedom" (2012), Reaching into Silence (1974), The Task of Adam (1985), Country Labors (1991) and Tabloid News (2005). His novel Nightwatch was published in 1989. His works of non-fiction include In Season and Out (1985), Standing Ground (1991) and Out Walking (2000). Grace Is Where I Live, originally published in 1993, was reissued in a revised and expanded edition by WordFarm in 2004.
