= Moss Lake Bog =

Site containing a glacial kettle lake in Caneadea, New York

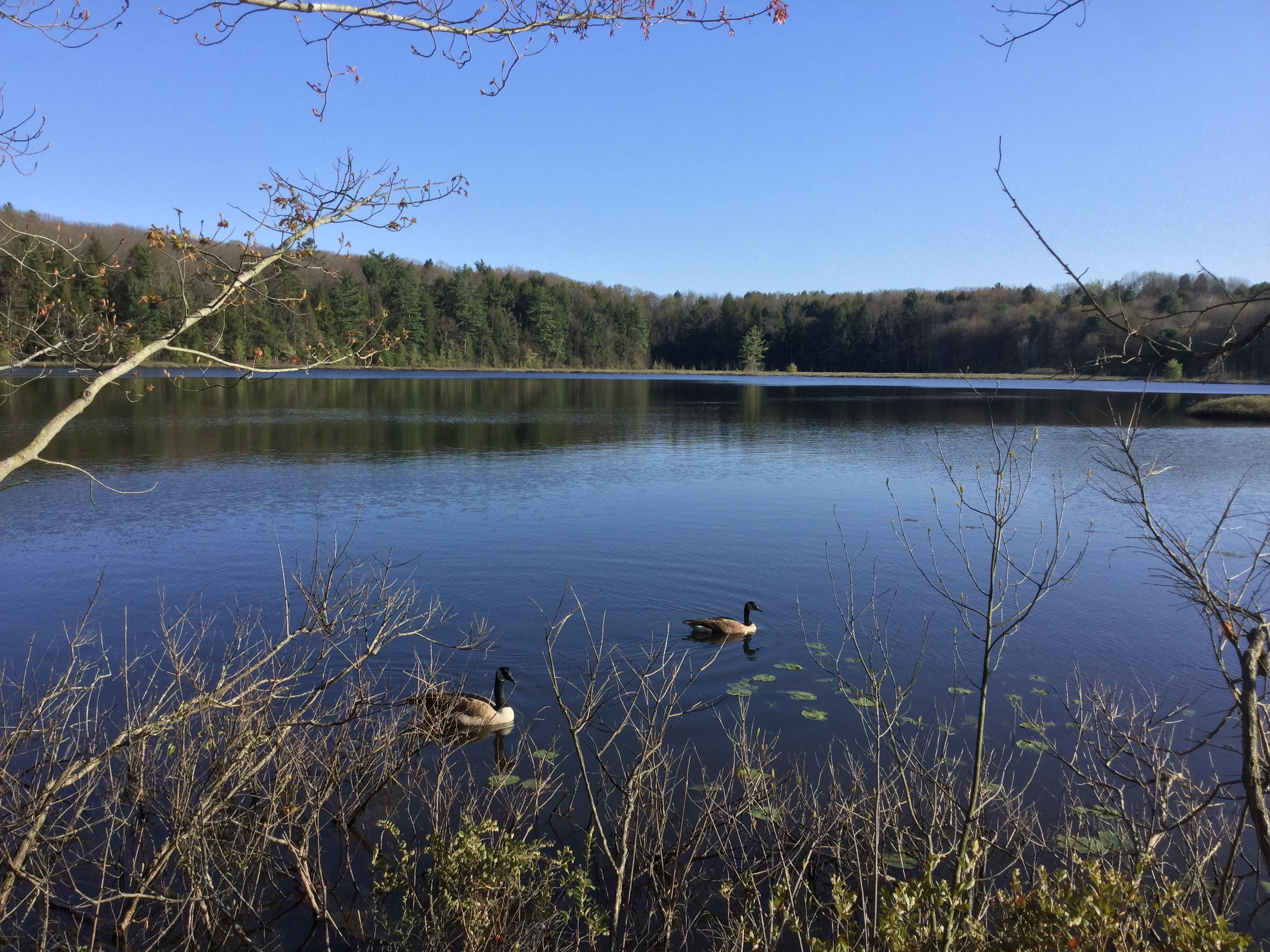

- Location within New York
- Location: Caneadea, New York
- Coordinates: 42°23′55″N 78°11′05″W
- Area: 84 acres (34 ha)
- Governing body: The Nature Conservancy

U.S. National Natural Landmark
- Designated: 1973

Moss Lake Bog is an 84-acre (34 ha) site containing a 15-acre (6.1 ha) glacial kettle lake located in the town of Caneadea, New York, outside Houghton. Over time, sphagnum moss has grown over the open water, turning it into an acidic bog. It is managed by The Nature Conservancy as part of Moss Lake Preserve, and was declared a National Natural Landmark in 1973.

== Visiting ==
Moss Lake Bog is open to the public daily. There is a trail which circles the lake and a boardwalk which lets you cross safely through the moss. Several types of carnivorous plants and over 75 species of birds have been sighted.

== See also ==
- List of National Natural Landmarks in New York
