= McGrawville, New York =

- Hamlet
- Location within New York Location within the United States
- Coordinates: 42°20′57″N 78°13′39″W
- Country: United States
- State: New York
- County: Allegany
- Towns: New Hudson, Rushford
- Elevation: 1,562 ft (476 m)
- Time zone: UTC-5 (Eastern (EST))
  - Summer (DST): UTC-4 (EDT)
- Area code: 585
- GNIS feature ID: 972780

McGrawville (also New Hudson) is a former hamlet on the border of the towns of New Hudson and Rushford, in Allegany County, New York, United States.

== History ==
The hamlet was named for one Mr. McGraw, a local landowner. According to a local historian, the settlement grew as a village around a saw mill, and at one time included "a store, cheese factory, blacksmith shop, and ten or twelve dwellings" including tenement houses for workers on a stockraising farm, and a boarding house. It was the location of a U.S. Post Office for more than 50 years, from 1849 through about 1900.
