= New Hudson, New York =

- Town
- Location within New York Location within the United States
- Coordinates: 42°18′42″N 78°14′28″W
- Country: United States
- State: New York
- County: Allegany

Government
  - Type: Town Council
  - Town Supervisor: Anthony Vekich (R)
  - Town Council: Members' List: • John Vattes (R); • Timothy Clayson (R); • William Shuler (R); • Jerry Enders (R)

Area
  - Total: 36.41 sq mi (94.30 km^{2})
  - Land: 36.28 sq mi (93.97 km^{2})
  - Water: 0.12 sq mi (0.32 km^{2})
- Elevation: 1,995 ft (608 m)

Population (2020)
  - Total: 801 ▲
  - Estimate (2021): 799
  - Density: 21.1/sq mi (8.16/km^{2})
- Time zone: UTC-5 (Eastern (EST))
  - Summer (DST): UTC-4 (EDT)
- ZIP Codes: 14714 (Black Creek); 14711 (Belfast); 14717 (Caneadea); 14727 (Cuba)
- FIPS code: 36-003-50375
- GNIS feature ID: 0979266

New Hudson is a town in Allegany County, New York, United States. The population was 801 at the 2020 census. The town is on the west border of the county, northeast of Olean.

== History ==
The area of the town was first settled circa 1820. New Hudson was set apart as the "Town of Haight" in 1825, from part of the town of Rushford and changed its name to New Hudson in 1837. The original name Haight was that of a militia general, who finally irritated the citizens enough with excessive demands that the people changed the name of the town.

== Geography ==
According to the United States Census Bureau, the town has a total area of 36.3 square miles (94.1 km^{2}), of which 36.2 square miles (93.7 km^{2}) is land and 0.12 square miles (0.3 km^{2}), or 0.34%, is water.

The west town line is the border of Cattaraugus County.

New York State Route 305 crosses the town, approximately parallelling Black Creek, a tributary of the Genesee River.

== Demographics ==
Historical population
Census	Pop.	Note	%±
1840	1,520		—
1850	1,433		−5.7%
1860	1,316		−8.2%
1870	1,142		−13.2%
1880	1,034		−9.5%
1890	978		−5.4%
1900	926		−5.3%
1910	852		−8.0%
1920	663		−22.2%
1930	565		−14.8%
1940	601		6.4%
1950	618		2.8%
1960	612		−1.0%
1970	579		−5.4%
1980	669		15.5%
1990	715		6.9%
2000	736		2.9%
2010	781		6.1%
2020	801		2.6%
2021 (est.)	799		−0.2%
U.S. Decennial Census

As of the census of 2000, there were 736 people, 268 households, and 198 families residing in the town. The population density was 20.3 inhabitants per square mile (7.8/km^{2}). There were 436 housing units at an average density of 12.0 per square mile (4.6/km^{2}). The racial makeup of the town was 98.37% White, 0.27% African American, 0.27% Native American, and 1.09% from two or more races. Hispanic or Latino of any race were 0.82% of the population.

There were 268 households, out of which 34.7% had children under the age of 18 living with them, 61.9% were married couples living together, 4.9% had a female householder with no husband present, and 26.1% were non-families. 22.0% of all households were made up of individuals, and 8.2% had someone living alone who was 65 years of age or older. The average household size was 2.75 and the average family size was 3.23.

In the town, the population was spread out, with 31.0% under the age of 18, 4.2% from 18 to 24, 26.8% from 25 to 44, 24.3% from 45 to 64, and 13.7% who were 65 years of age or older. The median age was 37 years. For every 100 females, there were 97.8 males. For every 100 females age 18 and over, there were 104.0 males.

The median income for a household in the town was $33,859, and the median income for a family was $34,702. Males had a median income of $27,917 versus $18,542 for females. The per capita income for the town was $12,319. About 12.8% of families and 13.1% of the population were below the poverty line, including 14.7% of those under age 18 and 6.5% of those age 65 or over.

== Communities and locations in New Hudson ==
- Bellville – A hamlet in the northern part of the town.
- Black Creek – A hamlet on Route 305 in the south part of the town. Also a tributary of the Genesee River flowing northeast through the town past Black Creek hamlet and Lyons Corners.
- Lyons Corners – A hamlet on Route 305 by the south town line.
- Marshall – A hamlet near the east town line, southwest of McGrawville.
- McGrawville – A hamlet near the north town line, northeast of Bellville.
- Rawson – A community at the west town line on County Road 7A.
