= Robert Dillard Stone =

American military officer and lawyer (c.1835–1864)

- Born: c. 1835; Virginia, US
- Died: May 18, 1864 (aged 28–29); Avoyelles Parish, Louisiana, US
- Military career
- Allegiance: Confederate States of America
- Service years: 1862–1864
- Rank: Colonel
- Commands: 22nd Texas Cavalry Regiment
- Conflicts: American Civil War; Red River campaign; Battle of Mansfield; Battle of Pleasant Hill; Battle of Yellow Bayou †

Robert Dillard Stone (c. 1835 – May 18, 1864) was an American military officer and lawyer. During the American Civil War, he was a colonel in the Confederate States Army, being killed at the Battle of Yellow Bayou.

== Biography ==
Stone was born c. 1835, in Virginia, the son of farmer Daniel Stone and Elizabeth (née Dillard) Stone. By 1850, he and his family moved to Jackson County, Missouri. On July 5, 1858, he married Laura Ringgold, in Jackson County. He later moved to Gainesville, Texas, where he practiced law.

In 1862, during the American Civil War, Stone enlisted as a second lieutenant into the 22nd Texas Cavalry Regiment. He was elected lieutenant of Company H, and in 1863, became a lieutenant colonel. From mid-April to mid-May 1864, he fought in the Red River campaign, commanding Polignac's Brigade. He was promoted to colonel during the campaign. In February 1864, he was made brevet brigadier general. He was the forefront commander in the Battle of Mansfield and the Battle of Pleasant Hill.

According to one source, Stone had a premonition of his eventual death. During a march, he hummed the lyrics "he sleeps his last sleep; he has fought his last battle", before telling his aide-de-camp "I feel that this will apply to me before the day is ended". On May 18, 1864, at the Battle of Yellow Bayou, he was struck by a Minié ball while sitting on a horse reporting to John A. Wharton, killing him instantly. He was either 28 or 29. He was buried at a church along the Yellowstone Bayou, approximately three miles from the battlefield.
