= Battle of Yellow Bayou =

1864 battle of the American Civil War

- Part of the American Civil War
Date	May 18, 1864
Location	Avoyelles Parish, Louisiana 30.9985°N 91.8668°W
Result	Union victory

Belligerents
United States (Union)	Confederate States

Commanders and leaders
(United States) Nathaniel P. Banks (United States) Joseph A. Mower	(Confederate States of America) Richard Taylor (Confederate States of America) John A. Wharton

Units involved
XVI Corps	District of Western Louisiana

Strength
4,500 plus cavalry	5,000

Casualties and losses
267–360	452–608
- Location in Louisiana

The Battle of Yellow Bayou, also known as the Battle of Norwood's Plantation, (May 18, 1864) saw Union Army forces led by Brigadier General Joseph A. Mower clash with Confederate States Army troops commanded by Brigadier General John A. Wharton in Avoyelles Parish, Louisiana during the American Civil War. This was the final action of the Red River campaign in which a Union army under Major General Nathaniel P. Banks was repulsed by Confederate forces led by Major General Richard Taylor. The failed Union campaign almost ended in disaster when an accompanying Union fleet led by Rear Admiral David Dixon Porter was trapped at Alexandria, Louisiana, by low water in the Red River. An engineering feat saved the fleet, allowing Banks' army to complete its withdrawal.

While Banks' army waited for a bridge to be built across the Atchafalaya River, Wharton's forces began pressing the Union troops from the rear. Mower was ordered to halt their advance. Mower's forces subsequently drove the Confederates back to their main line. The Confederates then counter-attacked and a back-and-forth battle erupted, with the Confederates finally repulsed. A thicket between the contending sides caught fire, ending the fighting after a few hours. Mower's holding action allowed the Union army to safely cross the Atchafalaya on May 19–20.

== Background ==
=== Union advance ===
President Abraham Lincoln and Major General Henry Halleck wanted a military campaign to plant the United States flag in Texas to counter the threat of the French-installed Maximilian regime in Mexico. Over the objections of Major Generals Banks, Ulysses S. Grant, and William T. Sherman, the venture up the Red River was ordered and assigned to Banks. In mid-March, one 17,000-man column under Banks moved north on Bayou Teche to meet a 10,000-strong column under Major General Andrew Jackson Smith at Alexandria. A. J. Smith's troops were accompanied by Porter's gunboats and river transports in the Red River. Slowed by low water in the Red River, the Banks-Porter expedition finally reached Natchitoches on April 2–3.

On April 8, Banks' troops were routed by Taylor at the Battle of Mansfield (Sabine Cross Roads) and compelled to retreat. Both armies were reinforced and on April 9, Taylor's attacks were repelled by Banks' army at the Battle of Pleasant Hill. Taylor's superior, General Edmund Kirby Smith reached the scene and decided to take Major General John George Walker's and Brigadier General Thomas James Churchill's divisions north to oppose a 15,000-man Union column coming from Little Rock, Arkansas, under Major General Frederick Steele. Kirby Smith left Taylor with only 5,200 troops to harass Banks' much larger army. Realizing that he could expect no help from Steele and required to return A. J. Smith's troops to Sherman, Banks decided to end the campaign and retreat.

=== Union retreat ===
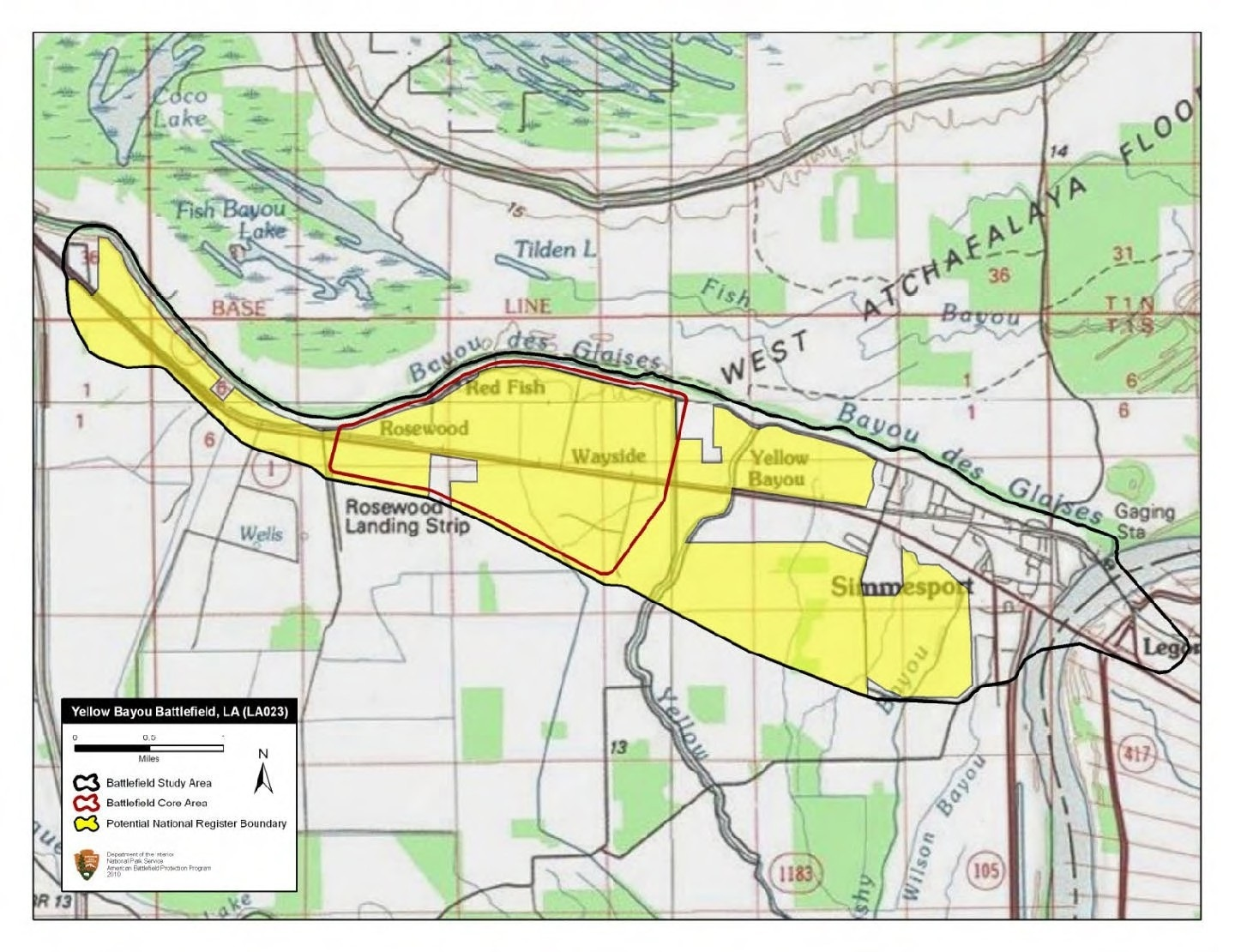
Map of Yellow Bayou core and study areas by the American Battlefield Protection Program.

On April 23, the Union army overcame a Confederate attempt to block its retreat at the Battle of Monett's Ferry and reached Alexandria safely. Porter's fleet suffered some losses to Confederate artillery in the action of 26–27 April 1864 and reached Alexandria, but his vessels proved unable to pass its rapids because of low water in the Red River. From May 4 to 13, Taylor's inferior force completely isolated the Banks-Porter expedition in actions near Alexandria. Finally, a Union army engineer, Colonel Joseph Bailey designed Bailey's Dam which raised the water level enough to allow Porter's fleet to pass the rapids on May 13. On that day, Banks' army evacuated Alexandria and continued its retreat. On May 14–15, there were skirmishes at Wilson's Landing and Marksville. Taylor tried unsuccessfully to block the Federal retreat at the Battle of Mansura on May 16.

On May 17, Banks' army crossed Bayou De Glaise and broke down the bridge spanning that stream. At Moreauville, Wharton pressed back the Union cavalry rearguard. When A. J. Smith's troops advanced to meet this threat, two cavalry regiments and an artillery battery led by Colonel Xavier Debray ambushed the Federals. Opening enfilading fire from a concealed position in the woods, the Confederates killed some of Smith's men and took others prisoner. Simultaneously, Colonel William O. Yager, leading his own regiment, the 1st Texas Cavalry, and the 2nd Louisiana Cavalry attacked the Union wagon train near Yellow Bayou. The wagon guard, Company E of the 92nd U.S. Colored Infantry, put up a spirited fight and the Confederates eventually fell back to Norwood's Plantation. Yager's men destroyed some wagons but were unable to remove any captured wagons because A. J. Smith's troops blocked the only road.

== Battle ==
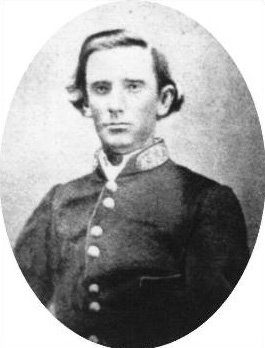
John A. Wharton

On May 18, Taylor tried one final attack on Banks' army before it could escape over the Atchafalaya River. He arranged all his troops in position at Norwood's Plantation. Confederate skirmishers pushed back the Union cavalry pickets toward the XVI Corps and XVII Corps infantry. In response, A. J. Smith ordered Mower to drive back the Confederates. Mower gathered about 4,500 soldiers, including the infantry brigades of Colonels Sylvester G. Hill, William T. Shaw, and William F. Lynch, and the 3rd Indiana and 9th Indiana Batteries, plus one cavalry brigade. Banks asked Mower to hold off the Confederates until the soldiers of the XIII Corps and XIX Corps at Simmesport could cross the Atchafalaya.

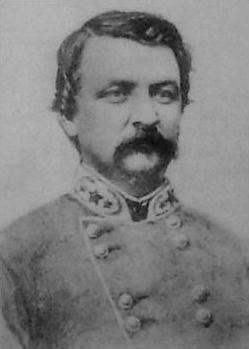
James P. Major

Mower's force advanced west across Yellow Bayou and drove back the Confederate skirmishers for about 2 mi (3.2 km). After struggling through a tangled thicket of woods, the Federals found themselves confronted by 5,000 Confederates in line of battle. According to William Riley Brooksher, the Confederate right wing was made up of Colonels Arthur P. Bagby Jr.'s and Debray's brigades, both from Brigadier General Hamilton P. Bee's cavalry division, and on the extreme right, Brigadier General William Steele's cavalry division which had only Colonel William H. Parsons' brigade. The Confederate left wing consisted of the 12th Texas Cavalry Regiment (detached from Parsons' brigade) on the extreme left, and Colonels William Polk Hardeman and George W. Baylor's brigades, both belonging to Brigadier General James Patrick Major's cavalry division. Wharton was in tactical command. Brigadier General Camille de Polignac's infantry division was placed on the left in reserve, from which Lieutenant Colonel Robert D. Stone's brigade was later committed to support the front line. In John D. Winters' account, Polignac's infantry division was on the left in the front line while Major's dismounted cavalry division was on the right.

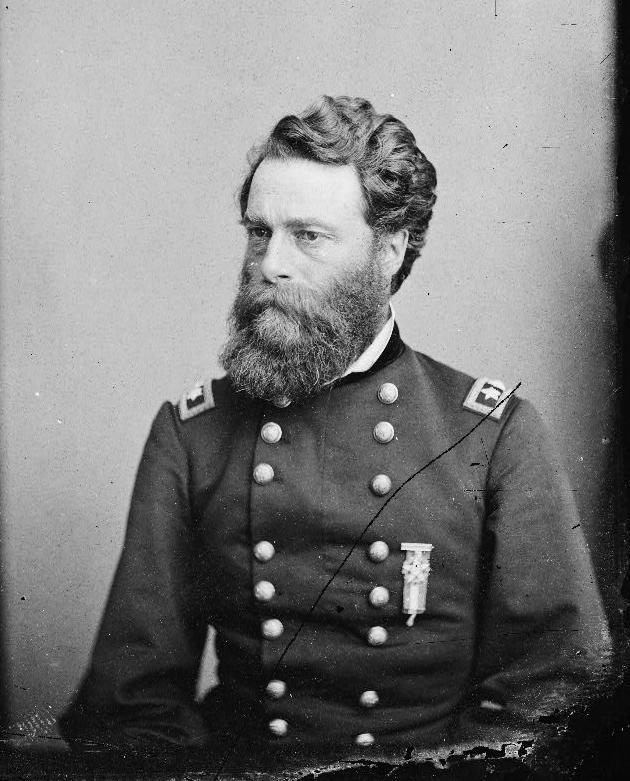
Joseph Mower

At first, the 12 Confederate artillery pieces dueled with the two Indiana batteries. Though they were positioned in an open field, at least some of the Confederates were protected by taking cover in a drainage ditch. As the cannonade tapered off, Wharton ordered an assault. Parsons warned him that it would result in serious loss of life and questioned the need, since the Union army was in retreat. Wharton ordered the attack to be made at once or Parsons would face a court-martial. Parsons' men charged on foot, but their attack faltered when threatened by Federal cavalry. Wharton's general attack began to force back the brigades of Hill on the Union right and Lynch on the left, so that Mower had to call on Shaw's brigade for support. The Union batteries began firing double canister shot. At this time, Hill's and Lynch's troops, flanked by Union cavalry, mounted a counterattack that drove Wharton's men back into the open field.

When the Confederates threatened the Union left flank, Mower pushed them back by reinforcing it with regiments from Shaw's brigade. The Federals did not pursue their adversaries into the open field. Mower, whose soldiers began to suffer from heat exhaustion and sunstroke, withdrew his troops from the thicket for a short rest before ordering them forward again. After re-ordering their lines, the Confederates charged again and the two sides grappled in the thicket. The Union troops ousted their opponents from the thicket, but it caught fire, preventing them from following up their advantage. At sunset, both sides withdrew from the burning thicket which consisted of dead trees and heavy underbrush.

== Aftermath ==
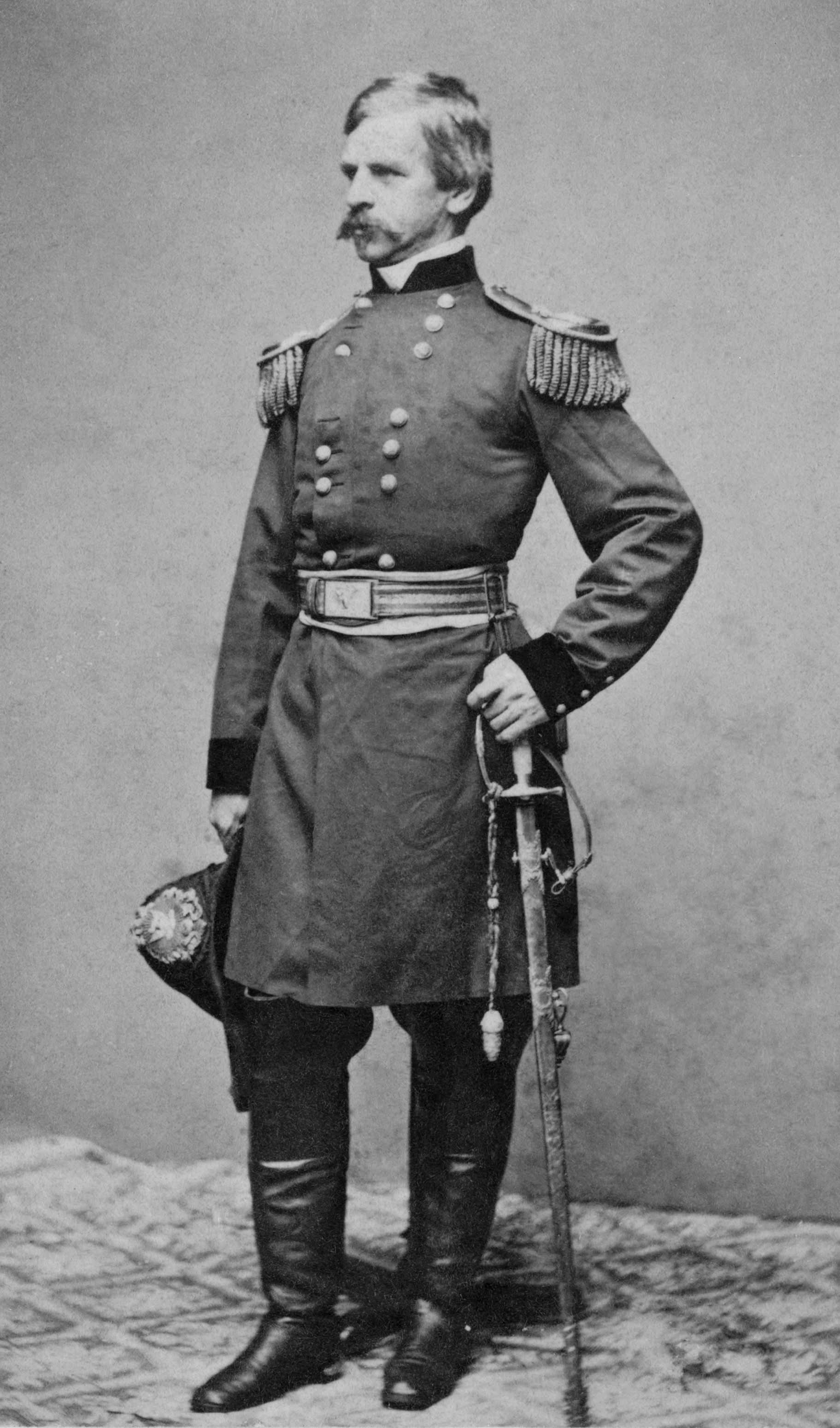
Nathaniel P. Banks

Mower reported losing 38 killed, 226 wounded, and 3 missing, for a total of 267 casualties. Taylor reported his losses as 30 killed, 350 wounded, and over 100 of Polignac's men captured, for about 500 casualties. The 28th Louisiana Infantry Regiment in Colonel Henry Gray's brigade, Polignac's division, "suffered numerous casualties" at Yellow Bayou. Brooksher estimated losses at 350 Union and 608 Confederate casualties. Tragically, Union Colonel Hill's young son, who rode into battle in full uniform on a pony beside his father, was among the dead. Mark M. Boatner III stated total losses as 267 Union and 452 Confederate. The National Park Service listed 360 Union and 500 Confederate casualties.

The Atchafalaya, filled with backwater from the flooding Mississippi River, was a serious obstacle to Banks' army. Banks asked Bailey to improvise a bridge and his engineer officer succeeded in accomplishing the task. Bailey anchored 22 river transports abreast in the Atchafalaya, lashed them together, and built a roadway across their decks with gangplanks and lumber. The XIII and XIX Corps troops began crossing on May 19 and the XVI and XVII Corps troops crossed on May 20. After the bridge was dismantled, the wounded and sick Union soldiers were loaded aboard the transports while those fit for duty marched to Morganza. On May 21 at Red River Landing, A. J. Smith's troops left the army, bound for Vicksburg, Mississippi.

On May 18, Major General Edward Canby assumed command of the Military Division of West Mississippi, making Banks his subordinate. Banks retained nominal control over the Department of the Gulf, but his future responsibilities were purely administrative. That same day, Taylor wrote, "Nothing but the withdrawal of Walker's division from me has prevented the capture of Banks' army and the destruction of Porter's fleet. I feel bitterly about this, because my army has been robbed of the just measure of its glory and the country of the most brilliant and complete success of the war." In a series of letters, Taylor lashed out at his superior until Kirby Smith relieved him of command on June 10, 1864. Taylor was reassigned to command the Department of Mississippi and East Louisiana on July 18.
