= Cuba Lake Raceway =

Defunct auto racing venue in Cuba, New York

- Location: Cuba, New York
- Coordinates: 42.2544°N 78.2879°W
- Owner: William Rasmusson
- Opened: 1954
- Closed: 1958
- Surface: Dirt
- Length: .4 km (0.25 mi)
- Banking: High-banked

Cuba Lake Raceway was a 1/4-mile (0.40 km) dirt oval racing facility in the Chautauqua-Alleghany (or the western Southern Tier) Region of New York State.

== Overview ==
Cuba Lake Raceway was located on the north shore of Cuba Lake. It was one of a series of venues in the Twin Tiers region of New York and Pennsylvania where drivers began their careers before becoming known on the state and national scene.

The Raceway boasts Indianapolis 500 veteran Jim Hurtubise as one of its driver alumni.
