= McKinney Stables of Empire City Farms =

- U.S. National Register of Historic Places
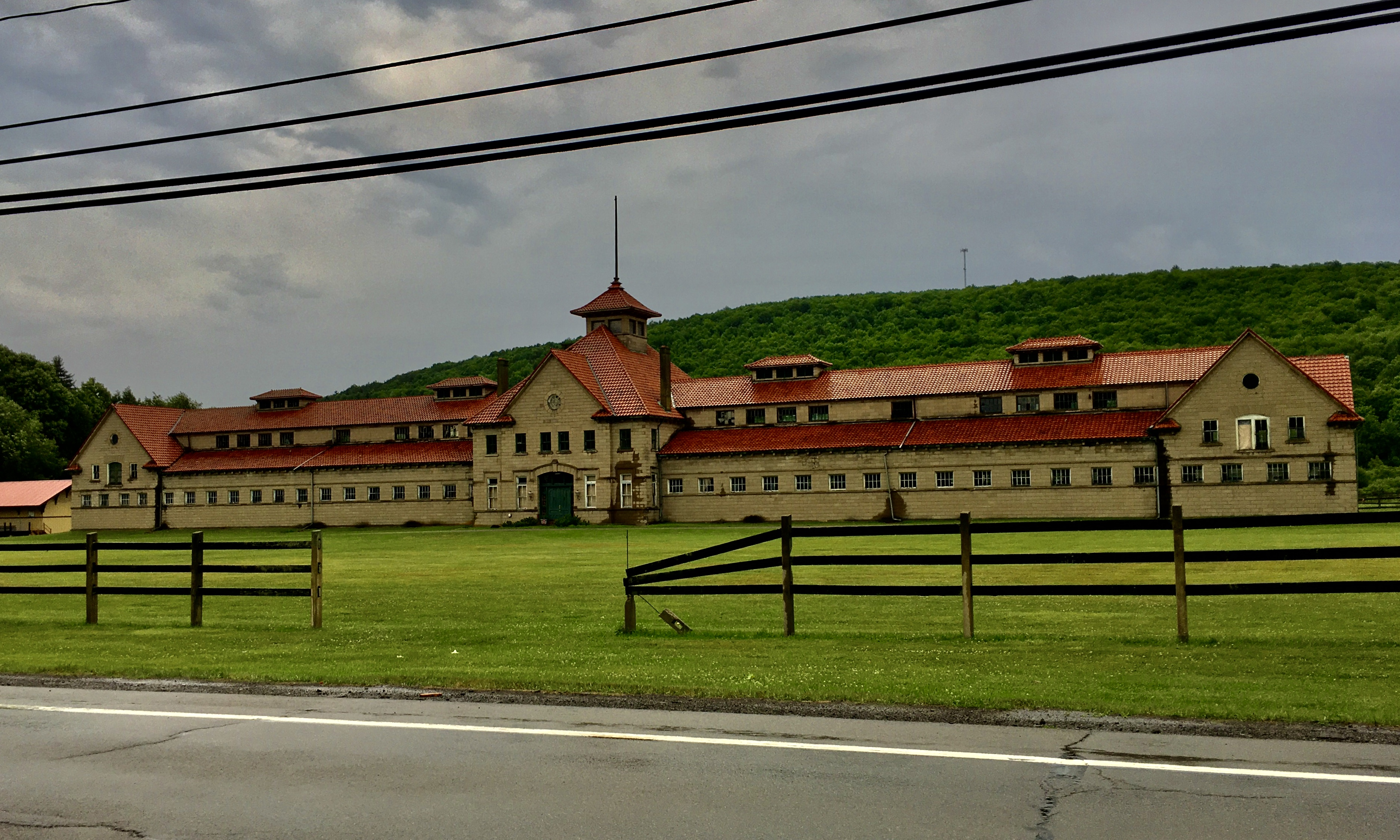
- McKinney Stables, July 2020

- Location within New York Location within the United States
- Location: 105 South St., Cuba, New York
- Coordinates: 42°12′37.4″N 78°16′26.7″W
- Area: 99 acres (40 ha)
- Built: 1907
- Architect: Coxhead, John H.
- Architectural style: Late 19th And 20th Century Revivals
- NRHP reference No.: 99001000
- Added to NRHP: August 12, 1999

McKinney Stables of Empire City Farms is a historic stable building located at Cuba in Allegany County, New York. It is a massive concrete block and terra cotta horse barn built in 1907–1909, and located on a 99-acre (400,000 m^{2}) property in a semi-rural section of the town of Cuba. It was built by William Simpson to house his prize trotter McKinney and McKinney's offspring. The stable is 347 feet (106 m) long and 50 feet (15 m) wide. Linear in plan, the 3-story center section is flanked by two, 2-story 150-foot (46 m) wings, that end in 2 1/2-story cross-gable story pavilions. The stable property lies adjacent to the South Street Historic District.

It was listed on the National Register of Historic Places in 1999.
