= 1st Texas Cavalry Regiment (Confederate) =

Cavalry regiment of the Confederate States Army

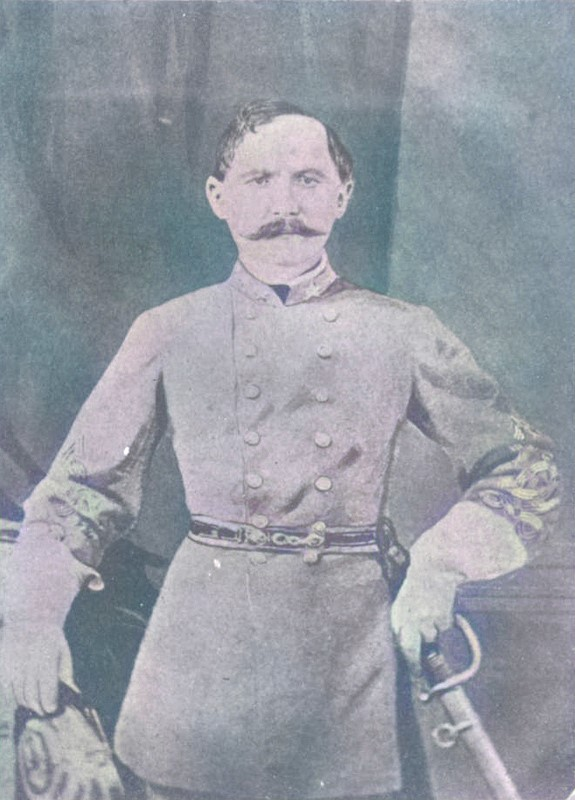
- Augustus Buchel, a veteran of the battles of Huesca and Buena Vista, commanded the regiment at Mansfield, and Pleasant Hill.
- Active: 1861–1865
- Disbanded: May 26, 1865
- Country: Confederate States
- Allegiance: Texas
- Branch: Army
- Type: Cavalry
- Size: Regiment
- Nickname: "Yager's regiment"
- Facings: Yellow
- Engagements: American Civil War; Battle of Mansfield; Battle of Pleasant Hill; Battle of Yellow Bayou

Commanders
- Commanding officers: Col. Augustus Buchel (1863–64); Col. William O. Yager (1864-65)

The 1st Texas Cavalry Regiment was a cavalry formation of the Confederate States Army in the Trans-Mississippi Theater of the American Civil War.

== History ==
The regiment was organized with ten companies by Colonel Henry E. McCulloch in April 1861 and named the 1st Texas Mounted Rifles. In early May 1861, the regiment secured the surrender of the small Federal garrison of San Antonio. Except from a skirmish with Native Americans in November 1861, the regiment took part in no more actions. In April 1862, the regiment was reduced to five companies and renamed the 8th Texas Cavalry Battalion.

On May 2, 1862, William O. Yager's 3rd Texas Cavalry Battalion was consolidated with the 8th Cavalry Battalion to form a new 1st Texas Cavalry Regiment under Colonel Augustus Buchel, a German soldier of fortune who emigrated to Texas in 1845. The regiment served on the Texas Gulf Coast in 1863 but later transferred to Louisiana. In 1864, it fought at Mansfield, Pleasant Hill, and Yellow Bayou in the Red River Campaign. After Buchel died of wound received at the Battle of Pleasant Hill, Yager led the 1st Texas Cavalry Regiment for the rest of the American Civil War. The regiment was included in the May 26, 1865, surrender.

== See also ==
- List of Texas Civil War Confederate units
