= Black Creek, New York =

- Hamlet
- Location within New York Location within the United States
- Coordinates: 42°16′32″N 78°13′35″W
- Country: United States
- State: New York
- County: Allegany
- Town: New Hudson
- Elevation: 1,509 ft (460 m)
- Time zone: UTC-5 (Eastern (EST))
  - Summer (DST): UTC-4 (EDT)
- ZIP code: 14714
- Area code: 585
- GNIS feature ID: 944096

Black Creek (also New Hudson Corners) is a hamlet in the town of New Hudson, in Allegany County, New York, United States. The name is derived from a stream that flows nearby. The community lies between Cuba and Belfast on Route 305. Black Creek has a large population of Amish citizens.

The United States Postal Service operates a post office in Black Creek with the ZIP code 14714.
