= Buchel County, Texas =

Coordinates: 30°12′N 103°15′W

Buchel County
- Former county
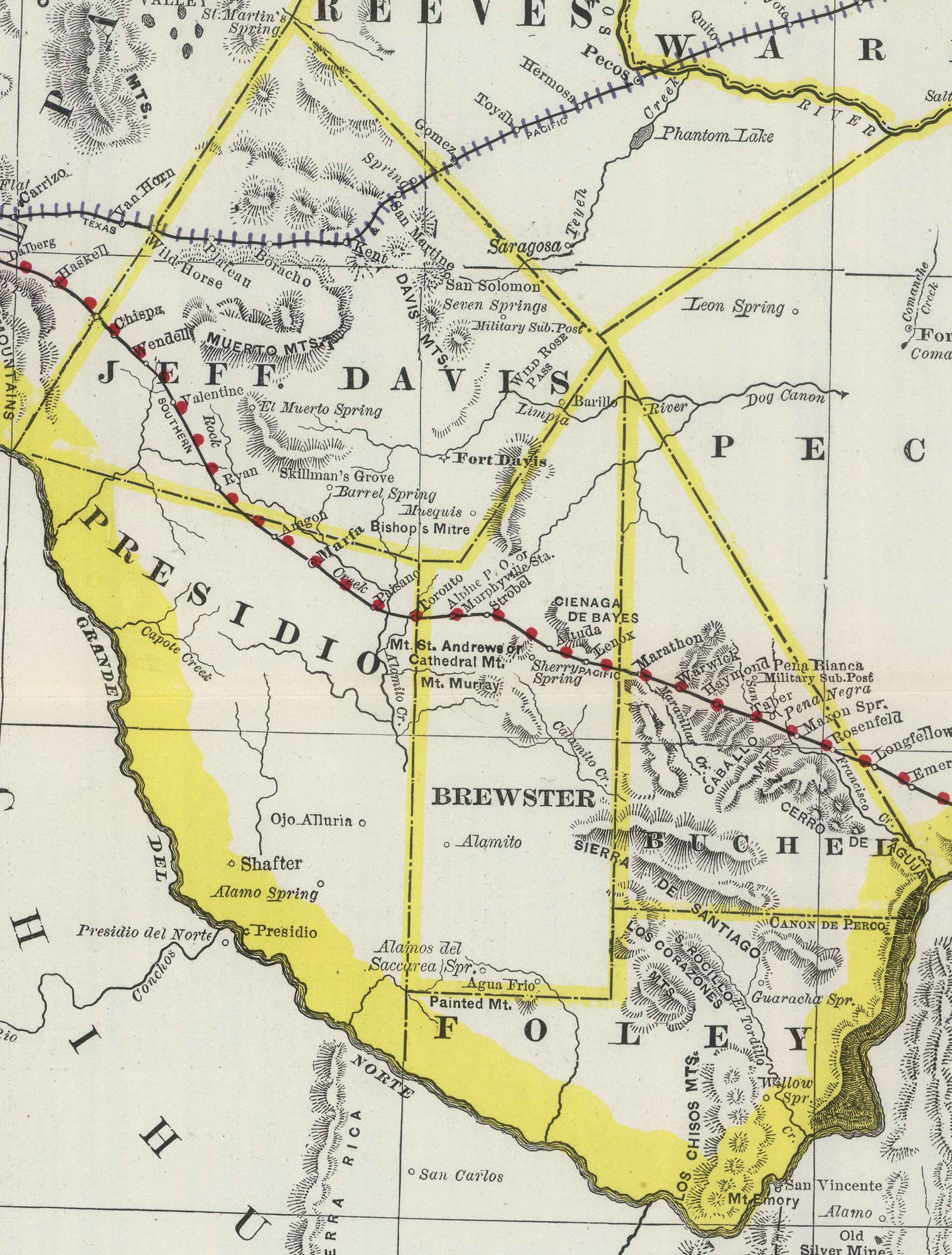
- Map depicting Buchel County's location in 1888
- Interactive map of Buchel County
- Country: United States
- State: Texas
- Founded: 1887–1897
- Abolished: 1897
- Named for: Augustus Buchel
- Seat: Marathon

Population
  - Estimate (1890): 298

Buchel County was a former Texas county. Its area is now completely contained in the present Brewster County.

== History ==
On March 15, 1887, the Texas legislature passed legislation that divided Presidio County into four counties: Presidio, Jeff Davis, Foley and Buchel. Named after German soldier and war hero Augustus Buchel, the county occupied the northeast corner of what is now Brewster County including the town of Marathon which was to serve as the county seat. The 1890 Census reported 298 residents in Buchel County, the majority of whom lived in Marathon. In 1889, it and neighboring Foley County were attached to the original Brewster County for surveying purposes, and in 1897 both counties were abolished and absorbed by Brewster County.

=== Attempts to reestablish ===
During the first decades of the twentieth century, some Texans tried to reorganize the county. As early as 1909, one newspaper reported that "A movement is on foot to re-establish Buchel county and make Marathon the county seat."

In 1915, a bill submitted to the 34th Texas Legislature (SB 187) sought to establish Buchel County from territory in Brewster County. Reports suggested that the bill was supported by representatives and there was little expected opposition, however no final version of the text was published as law, suggesting that the bill was never passed.

== Geography ==
The Texas state law that created the new county laid out the following boundaries:

Buchel County is bounded as follows, to-wit: Beginning at the northeast corner of Brewster County on the Presidio and Pecos County line; thence south with the east line of Brewster County sixty miles; thence east to the Rio Grande River; thence down said river with its meanders to the Pecos County line; thence in a northwesterly direction among said Pecos County line to the place of the beginning.

Adjacent counties

- Brewster County (west)
- Pecos County (east)
- Foley County (south)
