= 3rd Texas Infantry Regiment =

Infantry regiment of the Confederate States Army

- Active: 1861–1865
- Disbanded: May 26, 1865
- Country: Confederate States
- Allegiance: Texas
- Branch: Army
- Type: Infantry
- Size: Regiment
- Facings: Light blue
- Engagements: American Civil War; Battle of Jenkins' Ferry

Commanders
- Commanding officers: Colonel Philip N. Luckett

The 3rd Texas Infantry Regiment was an infantry formation of the Confederate States Army in the Trans-Mississippi Theater of the American Civil War.

== History ==
Colonel Philip N. Luckett organized the regiment on September 4, 1861. The soldiers were recruited in central Texas and included significant numbers of German immigrants and Tejanos. Texans regarded Germans with suspicion, since many opposed slavery, while Tejanos were considered lazy and untrustworthy. Morale in the regiment was poor and the number of desertions was high.

The regiment garrisoned San Antonio in 1861 and 1862, before moving to Brownsville, Texas, in January 1863. The regiment traveled to Galveston in May 1863. The unit transferred to Arkansas in March 1864 where it joined William R. Scurry's 3rd Brigade in Walker's Texas Division. It fought at Jenkins' Ferry at the end of April 1864. The regiment marched to Hempstead, Texas, where it disbanded before the official surrender date of 26 May 1865.

== See also ==
- List of Texas Civil War Confederate units
