= Rushford (CDP), New York =

Rushford, New York
- Census-designated place
- Location within the state of New York
- Coordinates: 42°23′31″N 78°15′12″W
- Country: United States
- State: New York
- County: Allegany
- Town: Rushford

Area
  - Total: 0.59 sq mi (1.52 km^{2})
  - Land: 0.59 sq mi (1.52 km^{2})
  - Water: 0 sq mi (0.00 km^{2})
- Elevation: 1,500 ft (460 m)

Population (2020)
  - Total: 351
  - Density: 598.3/sq mi (231.02/km^{2})
- Time zone: UTC-5 (Eastern (EST))
  - Summer (DST): UTC-4 (EDT)
- ZIP code: 14777
- Area code: 585
- FIPS code: 36-64155
- GNIS feature ID: 0963104

Rushford is a census-designated place comprising the central settlement in the town of Rushford, Allegany County, New York, United States. As of the 2010 census, it had a population of 363, out of a total population of 1,150 in the town.

== Geography ==
The Rushford CDP is located near the center of Rushford, north of Caneadea Creek, a tributary of the Genesee River. New York State Route 243 bypasses the center of the community, forming the northeast edge of the CDP. It leads east 6 miles (10 km) to Route 19 in the Genesee River valley and northwest into Cattaraugus County.

According to the United States Census Bureau, the Rushford CDP has a total area of 0.54 square miles (1.4 km^{2}), all land.

== Demographics ==
Historical population
Census	Pop.	Note	%±
2020	351		—
U.S. Decennial Census
