= Foley County, Texas =

Coordinates: 29°20′N 103°15′W

Foley County
- Former U.S. county in Texas
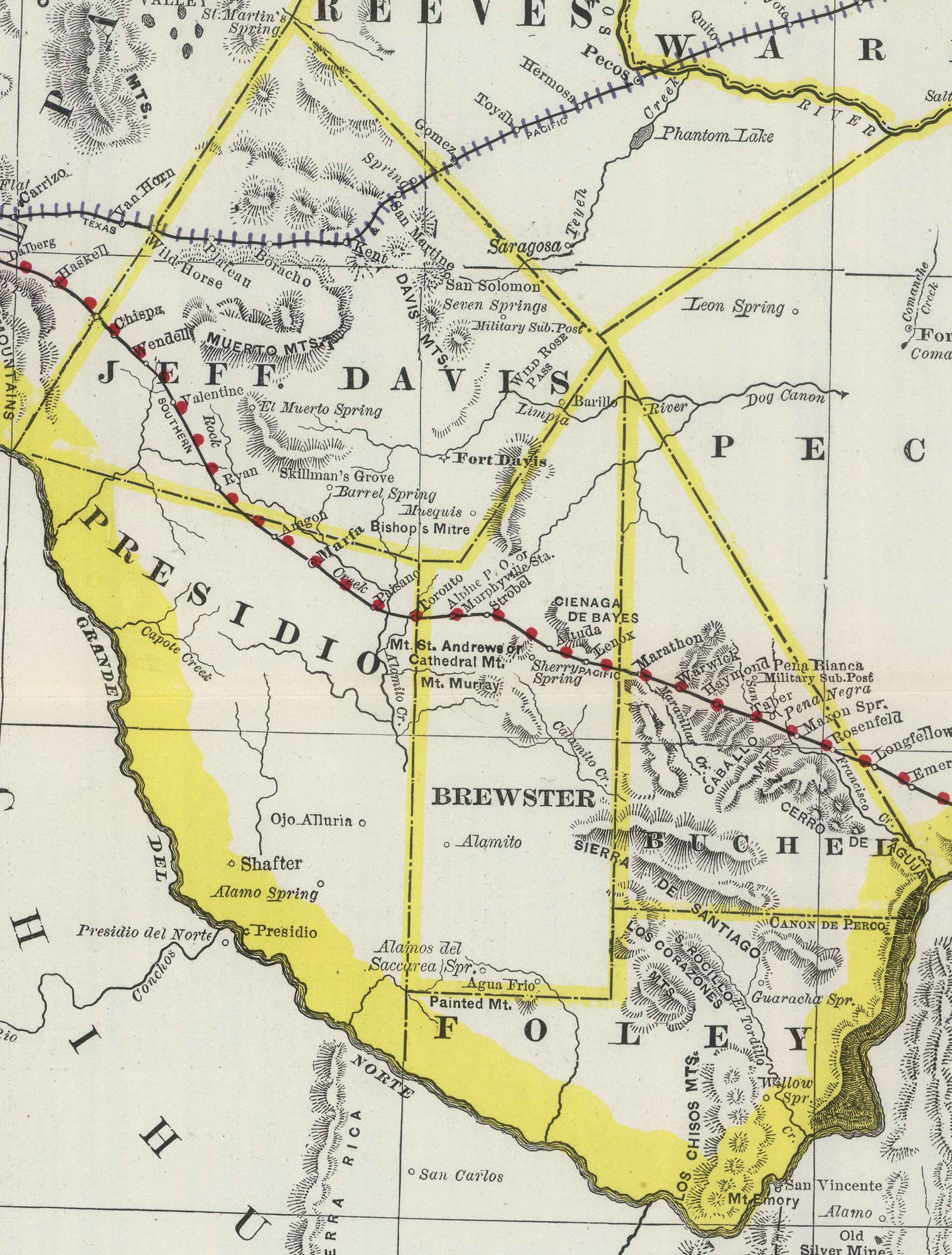
- Map depicting Foley County's location in 1888
- Interactive map of Foley County
- Founded: 1887
- Abolished: 1897

Population
  - Estimate (1890): 25

Foley County is a defunct county in the U.S. state of Texas. It was located in the Big Bend area of far West Texas in what is now Brewster County.

== History ==
On March 15, 1887, the Texas legislature passed legislation that divided Presidio County into four counties: Presidio, Jeff Davis, Foley and Buchel. Throughout its brief life, Foley County was sparsely populated; the 1890 Census reported only twenty-five residents, the majority of those living in Study Butte and Terlingua. In 1889, it and neighboring Buchel County were attached to the original Brewster County for surveying purposes, and in 1897 both counties were abolished and absorbed by Brewster County.
