= William Overall Yager =

American politician (1833-1904)

Personal details
- Born: April 3, 1833 Page County, Virginia, U.S.
- Died: January 20, 1904 (aged 70) Page County, Virginia, U.S.
- Spouse: Mary Elizabeth Rhodes (m. 1863)
- Children: 5
- Education: Virginia Military Institute

Military service
- Allegiance: Confederate States
- Branch: Confederate States Army
- Years of service: 1861–1865
- Rank: Colonel
- Commands: 1st Texas Cavalry Regiment (1864–65)
- Battles: American Civil War; Battle of Mansfield; Battle of Pleasant Hill; Battle of Yellow Bayou

William Overall Yager (April 3, 1833 – January 20, 1904) was an American politician from Virginia who previously served as a senior officer of the Confederate States Army, commanding the 1st Texas Cavalry Regiment in the Trans-Mississippi Theater of the American Civil War from 1864 to 1865.

== Early life and education ==
Yager was born in Page County, Virginia, to Nicholas Wesley and Christina Williams (née Overall) Yager. In 1852, he graduated from the Virginia Military Institute, fifth in his class. Relocating to Seguin, Texas, he married Mary Elizabeth Rhodes. The couple had one son and four daughters.

== American Civil War ==
Yager was commissioned a first lieutenant in the Confederate States Army onn April, 1861, and served initially as adjutant for the First Regiment, Texas Mounted Rifles, also known as McCulloch's Regiment. He spent the autumn and winter of 1861 with this unit in Central Texas and engaged in sporadic negotiations and skirmishes with local Indian groups. In December 1861, McCulloch recommended Yager as commander of a cavalry battalion, and, when the First Regiment was reduced to a battalion of five companies and re-designated the 8th Texas Cavalry Battalion.

In April 1862, Yager was authorized to form a new cavalry battalion. This unit, when organized, was designated the 3d Texas Cavalry Battalion, also referred to as Yager's Battalion, Texas Mounted Volunteers. When the 8th and 3d Texas cavalry battalions were consolidated on May 2, 1863, and renamed the 1st Texas Cavalry Regiment, Yager was promoted to lieutenant-colonel and placed second in command, with Colonel Augustus Buchel as commanding officer. Following Buchel's death from wounds he had received at the Battle of Pleasant Hill on April 12, 1864, Yager was promoted to colonel and given command of the regiment. He held the position until the end of the war.

== Later life ==
From 1874 to 1880, Yager represented Page County, Virginia, in the House of Delegates. He also served as county superintendent of schools in 1880, and county treasurer from 1884 to 1896. He died in Page County on January 20, 1904, and was buried in the Yager family crypt in Luray.
