= William Francis Lynch (general) =

US Army brigadier general (1839–1876)

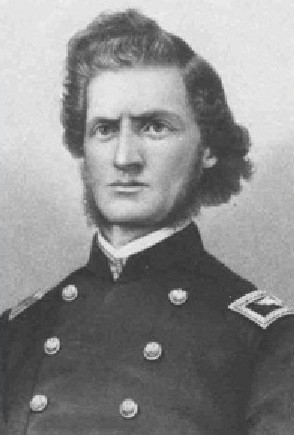
- From Volume I of 1908's History of Kane County, Ill.
- Born: 12 March 1839; Rochester, New York, US
- Died: 28 December 1876 (aged 37); Fort Larned, Kansas, US
- Burial place: Bluff City Cemetery, Elgin, Illinois, US
- Alma mater: University of Notre Dame (attended)
- Spouse: Julia Clifford (m. 1863–1876)
- Children: 5
- Military career
- Allegiance: Union (American Civil War); United States
- Service: Union Army; United States Army
- Service years: 1861–1865 (Union Army); 1866–1870 (US Army)
- Rank: Brigadier General
- Unit: US Army Infantry Branch
- Commands: 58th Illinois Infantry Regiment; Camp Butler, Illinois; Fort Defiance, Illinois; 1st Brigade, 3rd Division, XVI Corps
- Wars: American Civil War; Battle of Shiloh; Battle of Pleasant Hill; Battle of Yellow Bayou

William Francis Lynch (12 March 1839 – 28 December 1876) was an American Civil War veteran who attained the rank of brigadier general in the United States Army. A native of Rochester, New York, he was raised in Elgin, Illinois and attended the University of Notre Dame, where he took part in the school's corps of cadets program.

Lynch served in the Union Army from 1861 to 1865 and while still in his early twenties attained the rank of colonel as commander of the 58th Illinois Infantry Regiment. He received promotion to brigadier general by brevet in January 1865 to recognize his commendable service, and he was mustered out in February 1865.

In July 1866, Lynch was commissioned as a first lieutenant in the regular army and assigned to the 42nd Infantry Regiment. On 2 March 1867, he received brevet promotions to major and lieutenant colonel, and he was promoted to captain on 20 March 1867. On 15 December 1870, Lynch was promoted to brigadier general in the regular army and he retired on the same day. He died at Fort Larned, Kansas on 28 December 1876.

== Early life ==
William F. Lynch was born in Rochester, New York on 12 March 1839, a son of Timothy Lynch and Katherine (Hogan) Lynch. He was raised and educated in Cuba, New York until age four, when his family settled in Elgin, Illinois. He graduated from Elgin Academy, then attended the University of Notre Dame, where he organized a military drill and ceremony company, the Continental Cadets, for which he provided instruction based on techniques he learned from Elmer E. Ellsworth while serving in a volunteer company, the Elgin Continentals.

The start of the American Civil War in April 1861 caused Lynch and his fellow cadets to volunteer for Union Army service, but parental objections from several caused Oliver P. Morton, the governor of Indiana to decline the offer. Lynch then returned to Elgin and in June he joined the 23rd Illinois Infantry Regiment; despite being only 22, his leadership of the Notre Dame cadets led to his appointment as the regimental sergeant major. He served in this position until September 1861, when he left the regiment because he had been authorized to return to Illinois to recruit a new one. Lynch succeeded in raising and organizing the 58th Illinois Infantry Regiment, which he was appointed to command with the rank of colonel.

== Continued career ==
Lynch led the 58th Illinois until it was mustered out in early 1865. The 58th Illinois was assigned to 1st Brigade, 3rd Division, XVI Corps, which was assigned at different times to the Army of the Tennessee and the Department of the Gulf. He was wounded and captured at the Battle of Shiloh in April 1862. While on parole in Illinois, he commanded first Camp Butler, and later Fort Defiance. He was exchanged about six months later, after which he resumed command of his regiment. Subsequent engagements in which he played a role included the April 1864 Battle of Pleasant Hill and the May 1864 Battle of Yellow Bayou, Louisiana, at which he was again wounded. Lynch sometimes acted as commander of the 1st Brigade, and he continued to serve until he was mustered out of the United States Volunteers in February 1865.

In January 1865, Lynch received promotion to brigadier general by brevet to recognize his superior performance of duty during the war. For a brief period, Lynch was affiliated with the Fenian movement's planned invasion of Canada, and would have held the rank of major general in the proposed Fenian army. On 28 July 1866, he returned to army service as a first lieutenant in the 42nd Infantry Regiment of the regular army. He received brevet promotions to major and lieutenant colonel on 2 March 1867; the promotion to major was a commendation for his performance at Pleasant Hill, and his lieutenant colonel's brevet commended his service at Yellow Bayou. On 20 March 1867, he was promoted to captain.

Lynch's wounds proved disabling, and he had no assigned duties after April 1869. On 15 December 1870, he was promoted to brigadier general in the regular army and retired for disability. In April 1875, a newly-passed law adjusted the ranks of several officers, and Lynch's was fixed at colonel. Lynch visited President Ulysses S. Grant a few days later, after which his reduction in rank was reversed. He moved to Kansas shortly before his death and died at Fort Larned on 28 December 1876. Lynch was buried at Bluff City Cemetery in Elgin.

== Dates of rank ==
Lynch's dates of rank were:

- Sergeant Major (United States Volunteers), 18 June 1861
- Colonel (United States Volunteers), 25 January 1862 to 7 February 1865
- Brigadier General (Brevet), 31 January 1865
- First Lieutenant, 28 July 1866
- Major (Brevet), 2 March 1867
- Lieutenant Colonel (Brevet), 2 March 1867
- Captain, 20 March 1867
- Brigadier General, 15 December 1870
- Brigadier General (Retired), 15 December 1870
