= Joseph Hupp =

American chemist (born 1957)

- Born: March 23, 1957 (age 69); Cuba, New York, US

Academic background
- Education: BSc, 1979, Houghton College; PhD, 1983, Michigan State University
- Thesis: Correlations between molecular structure and electrochemical reactivity (1983)

Joseph Thomas Hupp (born on March 23, 1957) is an American chemist. He is the Morrison Professor of Chemistry in the Weinberg College of Arts and Sciences at Northwestern University.

== Early life and education ==
Hupp was born on March 23, 1957, in Cuba, New York. He attended Cuba Central School and played on their football team. As a senior, he placed 14th among 114 high school students who took the Nevins Mathematics Contest at Alfred University and was awarded automatic admission. Despite this, he attended Houghton College for his Bachelor of Science degree and Michigan State University for his PhD.

== Career ==
Following his PhD, Hupp became an associate research assistant at the University of North Carolina from 1984 to 1986. In his final year, Hupp earned the 1986 Presidential Young Investigator Awards and joined the faculty of chemistry at Northwestern University (NU). As a professor, Hupp collaborated with five NU researchers to attempt to create artificial enzymes to act as catalysts in chemical reactions. Following this, he was elected a fellow of American Association for the Advancement of Science and Materials Research Society for enabling discoveries in the synthesis of porous materials. He also received the Royal Society of Chemistry's 2014 Stephanie L. Kwolek Award for "key enabling discoveries in the design and syntheses of functional materials relevant to energy science applications, including light-to-electric energy conversion and supramolecular framework-based sensing, sieving, gas storage and catalysis."

In 2018, Hupp received the George S. Hammond Award from the Inter-American Photochemical Society for "his range of contributions from fundamental work on light-induced electron-transfer reactions to elucidation of mechanisms for molecule-powered solar cells to design and synthesis of new classes of light-harvesting and photocatalytic materials." The following year, he was appointed Energy & Environmental Science’s Editorial Board Chair and was listed amongst the 2019 Highly Cited Researchers from Clarivate Analytics. As the Morrison Professor of Chemistry, Hupp was elected to the American Academy of Arts and Sciences
