= 58th Illinois Infantry Regiment =

58th Regiment Illinois Volunteer Infantry
- Illinois state flag
- Active: February 11, 1862, to April 15, 1866
- Country: United States
- Allegiance: Union
- Branch: Infantry
- Nickname: "Lyon Color Guard"
- Engagements: Capture of Fort Henry; Capture of Fort Donelson; Battle of Shiloh; Battle of Corinth; Battle of Nashville; Pleasant Hill, Louisiana

The 58th Regiment Illinois Volunteer Infantry also known as the "Lyon Color Guard" was an infantry regiment that served in the Union Army during the American Civil War.

== Service ==
The 58th Illinois Infantry was organized at Camp Douglas, Chicago, Illinois and mustered into Federal service on December 26, 1861.

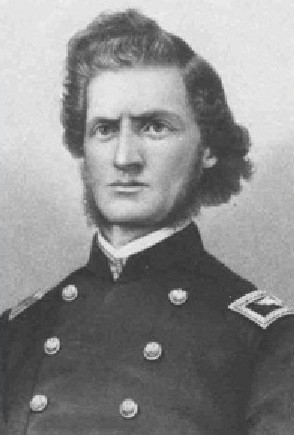
Colonel William F. Lynch was the regiment's first commander in December, 1861.

=== 1862 ===
After being mustered into service, the regiment, now over 887 men, proceeded to Cairo, Illinois via the Illinois Central Railroad, where it was immediately issued their armaments and headed for the Vicinity of Fort Donelson.

==== Battle of Fort Donelson ====
Once at Fort Donelson, the regiment sent two companies for the engagement on February 14, where they were briefly engaged with the Confederates, suffering minimal casualties. The regiment was yet again briefly under fire during the afternoon of February 15, while attempting to move into an strategic position. Despite the regiment being equipped with outdated firearms, the regiment managed to perform well.

The next battle the regiment participated was the Battle of Shiloh, where during the 1st day's fighting on April 6, the regiment was under fire from the Confederates, and it was forced to surrender, with 223 men and officers surrendering to the Confederates.

The men who were left in the camp of the 58th Illinois strengthened the remnants of the regiment, including those who were recovered from the hospitals, before it participated in the Siege of Corinth, participating in several skirmishes and engagements there, the regiment lost 23 men killed, wounded and taken prisoners at the Battle of Iuka.

=== 1863 ===
The regiment the year of 1863, performing guard duty on Confederate prisoners in Illinois, where they had also faced several skirmishes against Confederate forces, before it was transferred to Mississippi in January, 1864, to participate in the Meridian Campaign.

=== 1864 ===
Once in Mississippi, the regiment became the first regiment to engage the Confederates at a skirmish at Queen's Hill, and was the first to enter Meridian, Mississippi.

==== Red River Campaign ====
The regiment went on to participate in the Red River Campaign, where they were engaged in the Battle of Fort De Russy, the first battle in the campaign, where the regiment's colors were the first to be planted on the Confederate earthworks. The 58th Illinois then participated in the Battle of Pleasant Hill, distinguishing themselves, when it captured over 500 Confederates as prisoners, and retook a battery belonging to the Battery L of the 1st U.S. Artillery, which had been captured the day earlier.While returning after the campaign, the regiment was engaged in battles at Marksville Prairie, Cloutierville and Yellow Bayou, where it suffered heavy losses, including 9 color bearers, who were shot in less than 10 minutes.

When the regiment arrived in Memphis on June 10, the veterans who re-enlisted were given a furlough, while the non-veterans were sent to Tupelo, Mississippi, where they

The regiment was mustered out on April 15, 1866.

== Total strength and casualties ==
The regiment suffered 8 officers and 75 enlisted men who were killed in action or mortally wounded and 4 officers and 211 enlisted men who died of disease, for a total of 298 fatalities.

== Commanders ==
- Colonel William Francis Lynch - mustered out with the regiment.

== See also ==
- List of Illinois Civil War Units
- Illinois in the American Civil War
