= New York State Route 243 =

East–west state highway in New York state

New York State Route 243
- Map of western New York with NY 243 highlighted in red

Route information
- Maintained by NYSDOT
- Length: 11.03 mi (17.75 km)
- Existed: 1930–present

Major junctions
- West end: NY 98 in Freedom
- East end: NY 19 in Caneadea

Location
- Country: United States
- State: New York
- Counties: Cattaraugus, Allegany

Highway system
- New York Highways; Interstate; US; State; Reference; Parkways
← NY 242	→ NY 244

New York State Route 243 (NY 243) is a 11.03-mile (17.75 km) east–west state highway in the Southern Tier of New York in the United States. It begins at an intersection with NY 98 in the town of Freedom and proceeds southeastward across mostly rural areas of Cattaraugus and Allegany counties to Rushford Lake. From here, the highway turns eastward into the town of Caneadea, where it ends at a junction with NY 19.

NY 243 has been altered since it was assigned as part of the 1930 renumbering of state highways in New York, specifically a truncation from Farmersville to NY 98 in Freedom. The junction between NY 98 and NY 243 was reconstructed in the middle of the 20th century.

== Route description ==
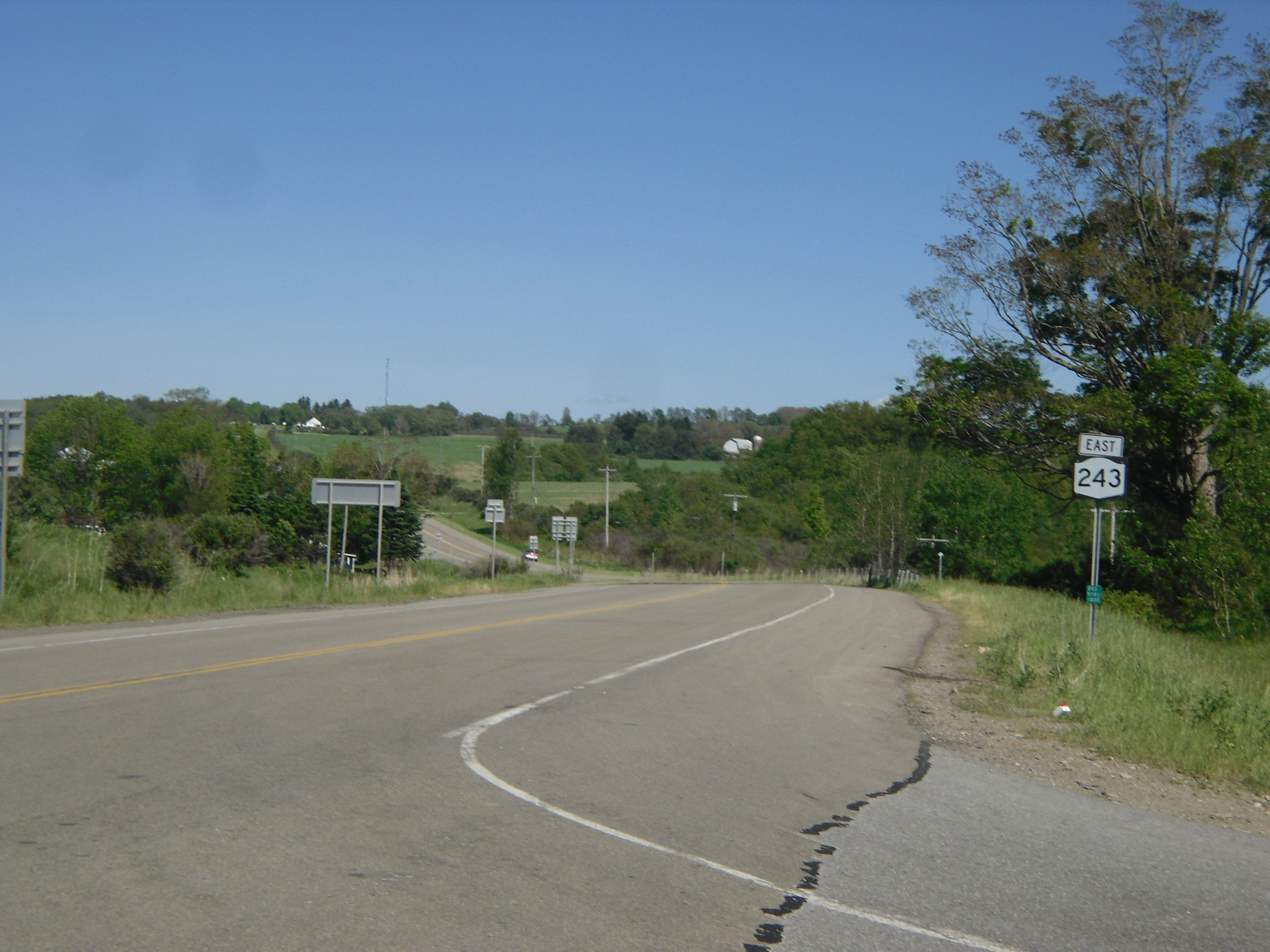
NY 243 eastbound at NY 98 in Freedom

NY 243 begins at an intersection with NY 98 in the Cattaraugus County town of Freedom, just north of the Farmersville–Freedom town line. The route proceeds eastward as a two-lane rural road, passing several farms on the town line before crossing into Allegany County at the hamlet of Fairview, located at a five-way intersection with County Line, Hyuck, and Fairview roads. From here, the route trends southeastward into the town of Rushford, where it winds its way across rolling, mostly open terrain to the isolated hamlet of Rushford. NY 243 largely bypasses the community to the northeast, intersecting the northern terminus of County Route 7B (CR 7B, named Buffalo Street) and CR 7E (Upper Street) as it curves around Rushford. East of the hamlet, the highway runs generally eastward across another rural stretch, following the northern edge of Caneadea Creek as it connects to the southern terminus of CR 23 and the western end of CR 49. Not far from the latter junction, the creek empties into Rushford Lake, a small water body located on the Rushford–Caneadea town line. NY 243 loosely parallels the northern edge of the lake, serving several local roads that lead south to lakeside houses comprising the hamlet of Balcom Beach. Past the lake, the roadway heads eastward across an undeveloped part of the town of Caneadea, veering to the north and south as it runs along the base of several hills. NY 243 eventually enters the hamlet of Caneadea, where it crosses over an abandoned railroad grade before ending at a T-intersection with NY 19 in a residential area just west of the Genesee River.

== History ==
The origins of NY 243 date back to the early 1910s when the state of New York improved the portion between the hamlet of Rushford and Rushford Lake to state highway standards. A contract for the project was awarded on April 5, 1910, and the rebuilt road was added to the state highway system on February 13, 1913, as unsigned State Highway 801 (SH 801). The section between Rushford Lake and the hamlet of Caneadea was reconstructed under a contract let on June 12, 1922. Work on the road was completed by 1926, and the highway became state-maintained as SH 1606. The remainder of the modern route northwest of Rushford was added in the mid-1920s. In the 1930 renumbering of state highways in New York, hundreds of state-owned roads were given posted route numbers for the first time. NY 243 was assigned at this time, extending from Farmersville to Caneadea over SH 801, SH 1606, and the Farmersville–Rushford state highway.

NY 243 has been realigned in two locations since it was assigned. In the town of Rushford, the highway was originally routed through the hamlet of Rushford, using Buffalo and Main streets and the southern half of Upper Street to traverse the community. Plans for a bypass of Rushford were drawn up by the state as early as 1961, when the realignment was proposed as part of a larger effort to improve all of NY 243 between the hamlets of Rushford and Caneadea. The project would also lessen the number of curves and eliminate high grades along the highway. It was completed sometime between 1963 and 1976. During the same period, NY 98 was reconfigured near the west end of NY 243 to intersect the latter at a new junction in Freedom, located just northeast of their original intersection in Farmersville. NY 243 was truncated to end at the new junction while the route's former routing into Farmersville became part of NY 98.

== Major intersections ==
County	Location	mi	km	Destinations	Notes
Cattaraugus	Freedom	0.00	0.00	NY 98 – Arcade, Franklinville	Western terminus
Allegany	Caneadea	11.03	17.75	NY 19 – Belfast, Letchworth State Park	Eastern terminus; hamlet of Caneadea
1.000 mi = 1.609 km; 1.000 km = 0.621 mi
