= Rushford, New York =

- Town
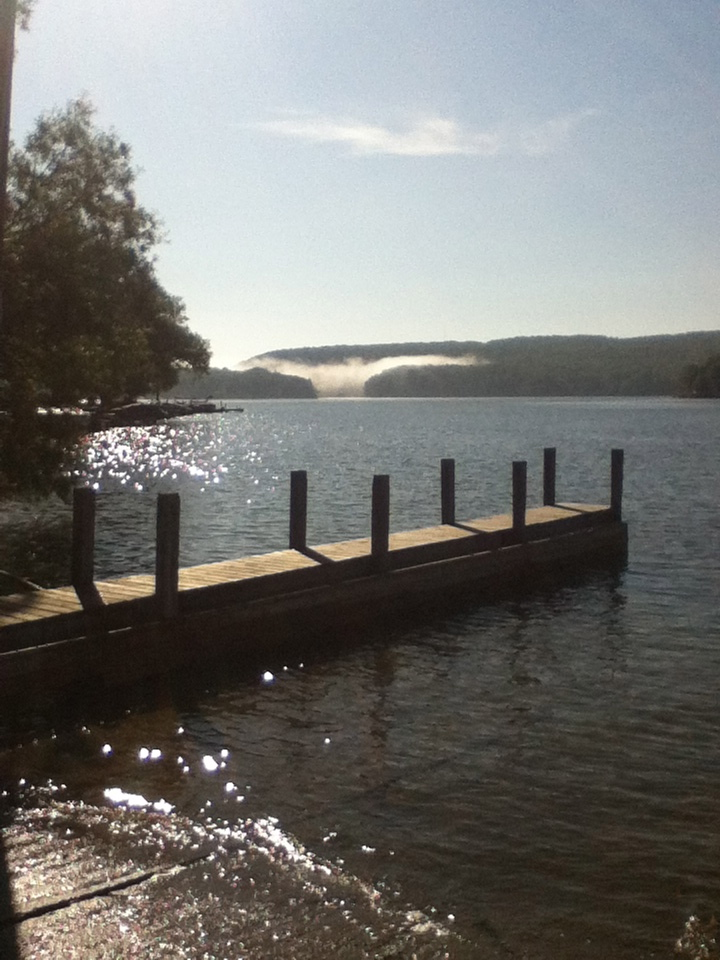
- Rushford Lake

- Location within New York Location within the United States
- Coordinates: 42°23′N 78°14′W
- Country: United States
- State: New York
- County: Allegany

Government
  - Type: Town Council
  - Town Supervisor: Peter Wade (R)
  - Town Council: Members' List: • Don Bliss (R); • Warren Pomeroy (R); • H. Doug Worthington (I); • Lynn Pomeroy (R)

Area
  - Total: 36.09 sq mi (93.46 km^{2})
  - Land: 35.29 sq mi (91.41 km^{2})
  - Water: 0.79 sq mi (2.05 km^{2})
- Elevation: 1,496 ft (456 m)

Population (2020)
  - Total: 1,085 ▼
  - Estimate (2021): 1,077
  - Density: 31.9/sq mi (12.32/km^{2})
- Time zone: UTC-5 (Eastern (EST))
  - Summer (DST): UTC-4 (EDT)
- ZIP Codes: 14777 (Rushford); 14060 (Farmersville Station); 14717 (Caneadea); 14727 (Cuba); 14737 (Franklinville); 14744 (Houghton)
- Area code: 585
- FIPS code: 36-003-64166
- GNIS feature ID: 0979441
- Website: www.townofrushford.gov

Rushford is a town in Allegany County, New York, United States. The population was 1,085 at the 2020 census. Rushford is in the northwest part of Allegany County and is northeast of Olean.

== History ==
The first settlers, Enos Gary and two of his children, arrived in 1808. The town of Rushford was formed in 1816 from part of the town of Caneadea. Part of Rushford was taken to form the newer town of New Hudson in 1825.

When Rushford Lake was formed by a dam on Caneadea Creek in 1927, the communities of East Rushford and Kelloggville were flooded by the rising water.

== Notable people ==
- Nelson F. Beckwith, former Wisconsin State Assemblyman.
- Hiram Bond, corporate lawyer and investment banker whose farm in Santa Clara, California, was used by Jack London as the opening scene in The Call of the Wild.
- Frank W. Higgins, former Governor of New York.
- James McCall, former New York State Senator
- Richard Henry Pratt, founder of the Carlisle Indian Industrial School
- Philip Gordon Wylie, a noted author, married Frederica Ballard who was born and raised in Rushford, New York; they are both buried in Rushford.
- Almanzo W. Litchard (November 12, 1841 – 1906) was a soldier, farmer, and legislator in New York during the nineteenth century. He fought as a Union soldier during the Civil War and purchased a farm in Rushford after serving his country. In later years he served as a member of the New York State Assembly.

== Geography ==
According to the United States Census Bureau, the town has a total area of 36.1 square miles (93.5 km^{2}), of which 35.3 square miles (91.4 km^{2}) is land and 0.77 square miles (2.0 km^{2}), or 2.19%, is water. The town center, Rushford, is a census-designated place.

The western town line is the border of Cattaraugus County (town of Farmersville).

New York State Route 243 crosses the town (east-west).

== Demographics ==
Historical population
Census	Pop.	Note	%±
1820	609		—
1830	1,115		83.1%
1840	1,512		35.6%
1850	1,816		20.1%
1860	1,839		1.3%
1870	1,636		−11.0%
1880	1,453		−11.2%
1890	1,355		−6.7%
1900	1,300		−4.1%
1910	1,260		−3.1%
1920	1,118		−11.3%
1930	936		−16.3%
1940	967		3.3%
1950	935		−3.3%
1960	995		6.4%
1970	1,021		2.6%
1980	1,125		10.2%
1990	1,176		4.5%
2000	1,259		7.1%
2010	1,150		−8.7%
2020	1,085		−5.7%
2021 (est.)	1,077	▼	−0.7%
U.S. Decennial Census

As of the census of 2000, there were 1,259 people, 479 households, and 346 families residing in the town. The population density was 35.6 inhabitants per square mile (13.7/km^{2}). There were 1,394 housing units at an average density of 39.4 per square mile (15.2/km^{2}). The racial makeup of the town was 98.97% White, 0.08% Native American, 0.08% Asian, 0.16% from other races, and 0.71% from two or more races. Hispanic or Latino of any race were 0.87% of the population.

There were 479 households, out of which 32.8% had children under the age of 18 living with them, 59.9% were married couples living together, 7.9% had a female householder with no husband present, and 27.6% were non-families. 21.9% of all households were made up of individuals, and 11.1% had someone living alone who was 65 years of age or older. The average household size was 2.63 and the average family size was 3.09.

In the town, the population was spread out, with 27.3% under the age of 18, 7.0% from 18 to 24, 24.3% from 25 to 44, 24.0% from 45 to 64, and 17.4% who were 65 years of age or older. The median age was 40 years. For every 100 females, there were 100.2 males. For every 100 females age 18 and over, there were 97.2 males.

The median income for a household in the town was $27,557, and the median income for a family was $30,938. Males had a median income of $26,800 versus $20,855 for females. The per capita income for the town was $13,156. About 13.4% of families and 16.1% of the population were below the poverty line, including 26.9% of those under age 18 and 6.8% of those age 65 or over.

== Communities and locations in Rushford ==
- Balcom Beach – A hamlet on the north side of Rushford Lake on Route 243.
- East Rushford – A former community now covered by Rushford Lake.
- Fairview – A hamlet at the northwest corner of the town.
- Hardy Corners – A hamlet in the southwest corner of the town.
- Hillcrest – A hamlet on the south side of Rushford Lake on County Road 49.
- Kellogsville – A former community now covered by Rushford Lake.
- Rushford – The hamlet of Rushford on Route 243, west of Rushford Lake.
- Rushford Lake – A lake located on the eastern town line, so that part of the lake is in the adjacent town of Caneadea.
