= Rushford Lake =

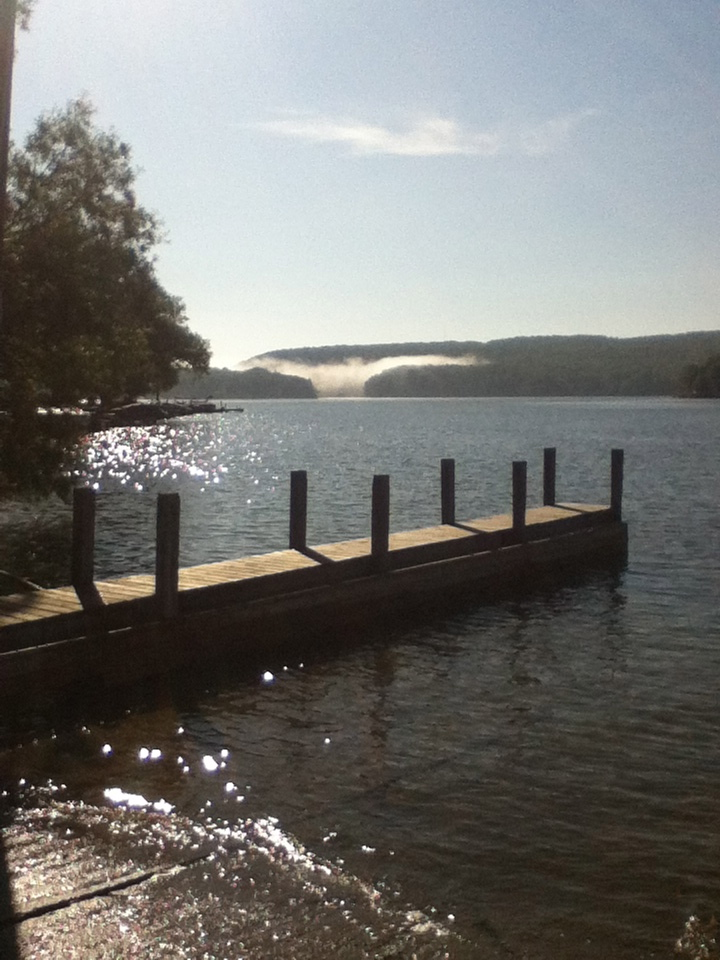
- Rushford Lake

- Location within New York
- Location: Allegany County, New York
- Coordinates: 42°22′57″N 78°11′34″W
- Type: Reservoir
- Primary inflows: Caneadea Creek; Rush Creek
- Primary outflows: Caneadea Creek
- Basin countries: United States
- Surface area: 585 acres (2.37 km^{2})
- Max. depth: 115 ft (35 m)
- Shore length^{1}: 5.3 mi (8.5 km)
- Surface elevation: 1,440 ft (440 m)
- Settlements: Balcom Beach; Hillcrest
- ^{1} Shore length is not a well-defined measure.

Rushford Lake is a small reservoir in the western part of New York, United States. The lake is in the northwest part of Allegany County, mostly in the Town of Rushford, but the eastern part of the lake is in the Town of Caneadea.

== Description ==
Rushford Lake is 585 acres (2.37 km^{2}) in size and has a crescent shape. Rush Creek and Caneadea Creek feed into the south and west ends of the lake respectively, and beyond the dam on the east side of the lake, Caneadea Creek continues east to the Genesee River. The maximum depth is 115 feet (35 m). The lake is drawn down 40 feet (12 m) each winter.

The communities of Balcom Beach (northern shore) and Hillcrest (western shore) are located near the lake. New York State Route 243 passes the northern end of the lake.

== History ==
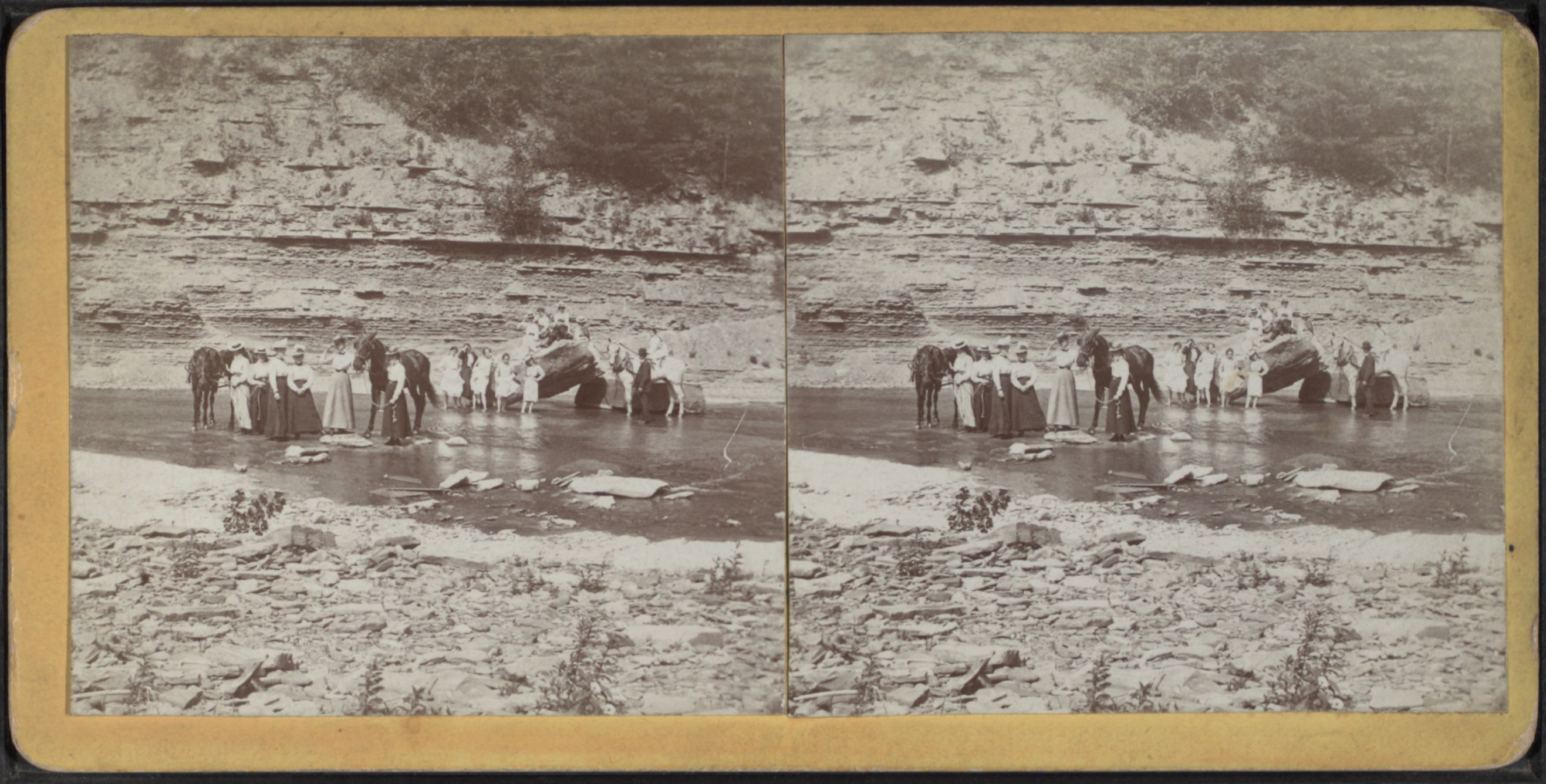
Rushford Gorge circa 1900

Rushford Lake was formed by a dam on Caneadea Creek in 1927, resulting in the loss of the communities of East Rushford and Kellogville by flooding. The dam and resulting lake were originally owned and governed by Rochester Gas and Electric (RG&E) for the purpose of controlling the water level in the Genesee River. In 1981 the dam and Rushford Lake was transferred to the Rushford Lake Recreation District which manages the dam, as well as lake and shoreline use.

Rushford Lake was the setting of the 2004 movie Ghost Lake. In the film, the souls of village residents who drowned after the dam's construction return one hundred years later to avenge their death. Actual shooting took place on the lake.

== Recreation ==
The lake is largely a recreational lake during the summer months. It is also stocked annually with brown and rainbow trout in the spring by the New York State Department of Environmental Conservation. Bass, crappie, carp, perch, suckers, bullhead and sunfish are also part of this fishery.

The angling public has access to the lake at two points. On the north side of the lake, the Balcom Beach area provides shore fishing access and a trailered boat launch. Launching for boats engaged in fishing only is free, seven days a week. Near the dam, an area off Dam Road provides shore fishing access. Ice fishing is permitted.
