= Ella Lonn =

Ella Victoria Lonn (1879 – 1962) was a scholar of American history in the United States. She wrote about desertion during the Civil War, the role of foreigners in the conflict, and the Reconstruction era.

She studied at the University of Chicago and the University of Pennsylvania. In 1946, the Southern Historical Association (SHA), name Lonn their first female president, with the honor being marked with a speech given by her on "Reconciliation Between the North and the South."

== Books ==
- Reconstruction in Louisiana After 1868 (1918) New York : G.P. Putnam's Sons, 1918.
- Women's Colleges And Americanization (1920)
- The Government of Maryland (1921)
- Conservation of the products of the Chesapeake Bay; under the auspices of the Central (Baltimore) district of the Maryland federation of women's clubs (1924)
- Desertion During the Civil War (1928) San Francisco : Golden Springs Publishing, 2016.
- Salt as a Factor in the Confederacy (1933) University of Alabama Press, 1965
- Foreigners in the Confederacy (1940) Greenwood Press, [1969, ©1951]
- The colonial agents of the southern colonies (1945) Gloucester, Mass., P. Smith, 1965 [©1945]
- Foreigners in the Union Army and Navy (1950)
