= Caneadea, New York =

- Town
- Logo
- Motto: "Where The Heavens Rest Upon The Earth"
- Location within New York Location within the United States
- Coordinates: 42°24′1″N 78°9′36″W
- Country: United States
- State: New York
- County: Allegany

Government
  - Type: Town Council
  - Town Supervisor: Michel A. Cox
  - Town Council: Members' List: • Philip G. Stockin (Deputy Town Supervisor); • Mary Jo Cronk; • Edward Brucato; • Christopher Enders; • Rebecca Crouch

Area
  - Total: 36.34 sq mi (94.13 km^{2})
  - Land: 35.65 sq mi (92.33 km^{2})
  - Water: 0.69 sq mi (1.80 km^{2})
- Elevation: 1,467 ft (447 m)

Population (2020)
  - Total: 2,238 ▼
  - Estimate (2021): 2,226
  - Density: 66/sq mi (25.4/km^{2})
- Time zone: UTC-5 (Eastern (EST))
  - Summer (DST): UTC-4 (EDT)
- ZIP Codes: 14717 (Caneadea); 14711 (Belfast); 14735 (Fillmore); 14744 (Houghton)
- Area code: 585
- FIPS code: 36-003-12243
- GNIS feature ID: 978787
- Website: caneadeatown.gov

Caneadea is a town in Allegany County, New York, United States. It includes the hamlets Caneadea, Houghton, and Oramel.

== History ==
The name Caneadea reportedly originates from a Seneca phrase meaning "where the heavens rest upon the earth". Following the American war for independence in which the Seneca aligned with the British, the majority of Seneca territory in western New York was ceded to the new American government with the exception of some small areas of land. One such area was a strip eight miles long and two miles wide in the Genesee River Valley that became known as the Caneadea Reservation.

The land of the reservation included much of the modern day township. Within the reservation was a small native village located on a bluff above the river. The village contained what is known as the Council House, which many years later was transported to what is now Letchworth State Park and renovated. Moses van Campen reportedly ran the "gauntlet" outside the Council House in 1782 while a captive of the Senecas during the American war for independence. The Caneadea Reservation's existence ended in 1826 after the Seneca sold the land to speculators.

The Caneadea township was officially formed in 1806, but included large portions of land that are no longer part of it. During the 1800s, much of the forested land was converted to farmland, including highly fertile land near the river.

Caneadea contained a route of the underground railroad, helping individuals escape slavery from the south. The Civil War's need for soldiers took a heavy human toll on the town.

Starting in 1851, the Genesee Valley Canal passed through Caneadea. While overall the canal was massively unprofitable for the state of New York, it did contribute significantly to the culture and economy of Caneadea and its hamlets Houghton and Oramel. Many businesses sprung up catering to canal traffic. Oramel became especially prosperous. Houghton was popular for horse racing and reportedly quite rowdy. New York finally decommissioned the boondoggle canal in 1878. In 1882 railroad tracks replaced much of the canal's old towpath. Trains stopped traveling through Caneadea in 1969, and the tracks removed in 1977. Today, much of the old railroad bed pathway is part of a recreational pathway.

In 1883, a seminary that was to eventually become today's Houghton University was founded by a farmer. The seminary eventually formed into a college that became accredited in 1923. Houghton changed dramatically from a wild canal port commonly known as Jockey Street (due to popular horse racing) into a more tranquil community strongly associated with the college and its sponsoring Wesleyan denomination.

In the late 1980s, a New York State committee was formed to find potential nuclear waste disposal sites. Caneadea, along with some other towns in Allegany County, was proposed as a potential site.There was significant disapproval by many area residents over this, and organizers committed to fight the state legally, politically and with civil disobedience. In 1990, protestors prevented the proposed site in Caneadea from being accessed by individuals from the siting commission. On January 16, protestors used their bodies and farm equipment to block roads. State police made eight arrests, but the site was still not accessed. On April 5, a larger effort was made to access the site and was met by a larger resistance. Six elderly individuals chained themselves to a bridge, resulting in their arrests and the chain being cut by state police. Farm equipment was again used for road blocking. Large amounts of protestors blocked the road and wore paper masks to hide help their identities. Horse riders blocking the road frustrated state police and played a major role in finally thwarting the unsuccessful attempt to access the site. Shortly after the second failed attempt in Caneadea, the governor of New York ordered the siting commission to discontinue its attempts to assess sites in Allegany County.

A significant event occurred in 1995 when a massive cannabis raid at a farm along Caneadea's main road discovered an estimated $100,000 (not adjusted for inflation) worth of the substance hidden in various areas including cornfields, hay bales, and a pigpen. Over 100 plants and about 50 pounds of harvested cannabis were reportedly seized.

== Geography ==
According to the United States Census Bureau, the town has a total area of 36.3 square miles (94.1 km^{2}), of which 35.6 square miles (92.3 km^{2}) is land and 0.69 square miles (1.8 km^{2}), or 1.91%, is water.

The town developed along the Genesee River, an important and historic Western New York river, which had also been valued by the Seneca. Rushford Lake is partly at the town's west line, and Caneadea Creek is an important stream in the town.

New York State Route 19 passes through the town (north-south) and intersects New York State Route 243 north of Canaeadea village.

== Demographics ==
Historical population
Census	Pop.	Note	%±
1820	696		—
1830	782		12.4%
1840	1,633		108.8%
1850	1,477		−9.6%
1860	2,125		43.9%
1870	1,869		−12.0%
1880	1,764		−5.6%
1890	1,639		−7.1%
1900	1,310		−20.1%
1910	1,354		3.4%
1920	1,183		−12.6%
1930	1,066		−9.9%
1940	1,089		2.2%
1950	1,845		69.4%
1960	1,911		3.6%
1970	2,364		23.7%
1980	2,421		2.4%
1990	2,551		5.4%
2000	2,694		5.6%
2010	2,542		−5.6%
2020	2,238		−12.0%
2021 (est.)	2,226		−0.5%
U.S. Decennial Census

As of the census of 2000, there were 2,694 people, 650 households, and 436 families residing in the town. The population density was 75.8 inhabitants per square mile (29.3/km^{2}). There were 1,098 housing units at an average density of 30.9 units per square mile (11.9 units/km^{2}). The racial makeup of the town was 96.33% White, 1.00% African American, 0.15% Native American, 0.97% Asian, 0.56% from other races, and 1.00% from two or more races. Hispanic or Latino of any race were 2.26% of the population.

There were 650 households, out of which 33.7% had children under the age of 18 living with them, 56.5% were married couples living together, 7.1% had a female householder with no husband present, and 32.9% were non-families. 25.2% of all households were made up of individuals, and 8.3% had someone living alone who was 65 years of age or older. The average household size was 2.72 and the average family size was 3.20.

In the town, the population was spread out, with 18.4% under the age of 18, 40.9% from 18 to 24, 16.1% from 25 to 44, 13.4% from 45 to 64, and 11.1% who were 65 years of age or older. The median age was 22 years. For every 100 females, there were 80.9 males. For every 100 females age 18 and over, there were 75.5 males.

The median income for a household in the town was $31,065, and the median income for a family was $39,667. Males had a median income of $29,643 versus $21,563 for females. The per capita income for the town was $10,010. About 12.7% of families and 21.3% of the population were below the poverty line, including 19.8% of those under age 18 and 1.0% of those age 65 or over.

== Notable people ==
- Lady Baldwin, 19th-century baseball pitcher
- William Muldoon, wrestler and first New York State Athletic Commissioner

== Communities and locations in Caneadea ==
- Caneadea – The hamlet of Caneadea is located on Route 19 by the Genesee River in the western part of the town.
- Genesee River – A river that flows northward through the town.
- Houghton – The hamlet of Houghton is the site of Houghton University. Route 19 passes the hamlet, located near the northern town line, adjacent to the Genesee River.
- Oramel – A hamlet on Route 19, south of the hamlet of Caneadea and near the Genesee River in the south part of the town. Oramel was incorporated as a village in 1856, but later abandoned this status; its post office (ZIP Code 14765) operated from 1850 to 1968.
- Rushford Lake – A small lake partly inside the western part of the town.
- Moss Lake - A unique body of water with moss covering much of its surface
