= Philip N. Luckett =

Philip Noland Luckett (about 1823 – May 21, 1869) was an American soldier and medical doctor. He served as a general in the Confederate States Army during the American Civil War and was most noted for his service in the Trans-Mississippi Theater. He was influential in convincing a veteran United States Army general to peacefully abandon Federal-held military installations to the Confederacy before the start of the war, providing the fledgling nation with much needed arms and munitions.

== Early life and career ==
Philip N. Luckett was born in Virginia. He attended medical school and became a medical doctor. As a young adult, he moved to Ohio, where he was offered an appointment to the United States Military Academy. In 1847, he moved, this time to Corpus Christi, Texas. He volunteered as the physician for the famed Texas Rangers, serving the company commanded by Captain John "Rip" Ford for most of the decade of the 1840s. Luckett became an ardent advocate of states' rights. He was suspected of being involved with the Knights of the Golden Circle.

Luckett was elected as a delegate from Nueces and Webb counties to the Texas state secession convention in the mid-winter of 1861. After Texas passed its ordinance of secession, Luckett was one of four men appointed as commissioners of public safety to negotiate with the Federal government for the safe transfer of military installations and bases in Texas to the Confederates. Along with land baron Samuel A. Maverick and Thomas J. Devine, Luckett met on February 8, 1861, with United States Army General David E. Twiggs to arrange the surrender of the Federal property in San Antonio, including the military stores being housed in the old Alamo mission. As a result of the negotiations, Twiggs delivered his entire command and its associated Army property to the Confederacy.

Luckett's lineage was (starting with the most distant known ancestor and working down through the generations): Samuel Luckett and wife Elizabeth Hussey, Samuel Luckett (2nd generation), Lt. Colonel William Luckett (3rd), Thomas Hussey Luckett (4th) and Elizabeth Noland, Otho Holland William Luckett (5th), himself. At least the first 3 generations were Marylanders. William Luckett of the 3rd generation was notable for his military service in the Revolution and for his being one of the "12 Immortal Justices" who combined on a decision striking down the Stamp Act on November 23, 1765, an event since commemorated officially as Repudiation Day in Maryland.

== Civil War ==
Following the bombardment of Fort Sumter in South Carolina, Dr. Luckett was appointed as the Quartermaster General of the newly organized Confederate forces in Texas. He served on the staff of the commander of the Department of Texas, Earl Van Dorn. He rode northward from his Corpus Christi home on a recruiting expedition, seeking volunteers to travel to designated recruiting camps in Austin and San Antonio. By May, his efforts were paying off, and hundreds of men had signed up for Confederate service thanks to Luckett's efforts.

In the autumn of 1861, Luckett was elected as colonel of the recently raised 3rd Texas Infantry, a regiment he helped raise during his recruiting trip. Luckett and his 648 men were initially assigned to Colonel Ford's Western Subdistrict of Texas and encamped along the Rio Grande for several months, starting in December.

Beginning in October 1862, Luckett and the 3rd Texas garrisoned a number of widely scattered posts from Fort Brown to Laredo. After spending the winter on the frontier manning a defensive line near the Brazos River just southwest of Houston, the 3rd Texas moved from Brownsville to Galveston, arriving in the coastal town on July 12, 1863. Within a few weeks, Luckett received a brevet promotion to brigadier general. By early August, he was back in Brownsville, having succeeded Rip Ford as subdistrict commander.

Luckett's men were reassigned in April 1864 to the front lines, serving in the brigade of Brig. Gen. William R. Scurry of Walker's Texas Division during the Red River Campaign. During the Camden Expedition, Luckett's regiment participated in the climactic Battle of Jenkins' Ferry, where Walker's "Greyhounds" helped repulse a Federal force under Maj. Gen. Frederick Steele. Luckett assumed command of the brigade following Scurry's death and led it for the balance of the year. However, a combination of illness and detached duty kept Luckett from any further front line duty as the war waned in early 1865. He served as a judge on the court of inquiry into Sterling Price's disastrous Missouri Raid.

== Postwar activities ==
With the collapse of the Confederacy in April and May 1865, Luckett, a firebrand secessionist, refused to surrender to Federal authorities. Instead, he and a group of forty men accompanied General John G. Walker across the Rio Grande into Mexico.

In November of that year, Dr. Luckett returned to Texas. However, he, along with fellow commissioner of safety Thomas Devine, was arrested by Federal authorities. He was transported to Fort Jackson, Louisiana, near New Orleans, and incarcerated over the winter. Efforts on his behalf were successful, and he was finally released from prison. However, Luckett's health was broken; he spent several months in New Orleans recuperating.

He was finally well enough to travel north to Cincinnati, Ohio, where he lived with several relatives until his death in May 1869.
