= Houghton, New York =

- Census-designated place
- Location within the state of New York
- Coordinates: 42°26′N 78°9′W
- Country: United States
- State: New York
- County: Allegany
- Town: Caneadea

Area
  - Total: 2.73 sq mi (7.07 km^{2})
  - Land: 2.72 sq mi (7.05 km^{2})
  - Water: 0.012 sq mi (0.03 km^{2})
- Elevation: 1,207 ft (368 m)

Population (2020)
  - Total: 1,937
  - Density: 546.9/sq mi (211.16/km^{2})
- Time zone: UTC-5 (Eastern (EST))
  - Summer (DST): UTC-4 (EDT)
- ZIP code: 14744
- Area code: 585
- FIPS code: 36-35771
- GNIS feature ID: 0953282

Houghton is a hamlet (and census-designated place) located in the Town of Caneadea in Allegany County, western New York, United States. As of the 2020 census, Houghton had a population of 1,488.

== Geography ==
Houghton is located at 42°26′N 78°9′W (42.4270,-78.1557).

According to the United States Census Bureau, the hamlet has a total area of 2.5 square miles (6.4 km^{2}), of which 0.012 square miles (0.03 km^{2}), or 0.39%, is water.

Houghton is located on the west bank of the Genesee River. New York State Route 19 passes the hamlet and provides access.

Houghton University is a private, Christian, coeducational college located here.

== Demographics ==
Historical population
Census	Pop.	Note	%±
2020	1,488		—
U.S. Decennial Census

At the 2000 census there were 1,748 people, 313 households, and 180 families residing in the region. The population density was 715.5 inhabitants per square mile (276.3/km^{2}). There were 333 housing units at an average density of 136.3 per square mile (52.6/km^{2}). The racial makeup of the community was 95.37% White, 1.54% African American, 0.11% Native American, 1.20% Asian, 0.86% from other races, and 0.92% from two or more races. Hispanic or Latino of any race were 2.35%.

Of the 313 households, 27.2% had children under the age of 18 living with them, 53.4% were married couples living together, 3.5% had a female householder with no husband present, and 42.2% were non-families. 29.1% of households were one person, and 5.8% were one person aged 65 or older. The average household size was 2.64 and the average family size was 3.17.

In the area the population was spread out, with 11.0% under the age of 18, 59.4% from 18 to 24, 10.1% from 25 to 44, 8.9% from 45 to 64, and 10.5% 65 or older. The median age was 21 years. For every 100 females, there were 70.2 males. For every 100 females age 18 and over, there were 67.7 males.

The median household income was $37,639 and the median family income was $49,375. Males had a median income of $38,125 versus $19,688 for females. The per capita income for the CDP was $9,139. About 8.7% of families and 25.0% of the population were below the poverty line, including 9.7% of those under age 18 and 2.0% of those age 65 or over.
