= 189th New York Infantry Regiment =

- Active: August/September 1864–June 1, 1865
- Disbanded: June 1, 1865
- Country: United States
- Allegiance: Union
- Branch: Infantry
- Size: Regiment
- Engagements: American Civil War: Siege of Petersburg; Battle of Hatcher's Run; Appomattox Campaign; Battle of Five Forks; Battle of Appomattox Court House

Insignia
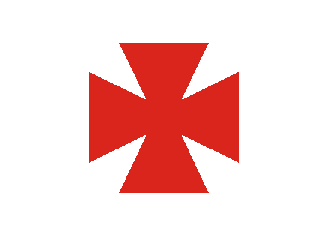
- 1st Division, V Corps

The 189th New York Infantry Regiment was an infantry regiment of the Union Army during the American Civil War.

== Service ==
In September 1864, the regiment's first two commanders received authority to recruit, and organized at Elmira, including four companies originally recruited for the 175th New York. It was mustered in the service of the United States for one year in August and September, 1864. One company was transferred to the 15th Engineers, but was replaced by a new company.

The companies were recruited principally:

- A at Bath;
- B at Bolivar, Wirt, Clarksville, Friendship, New Hudson, Caneadea and Alma;
- C at Wheeler, Bath, Avoca, Canoga and Urbana;
- D at Brookfield, Hamilton and Oswego;
- E in Oswego County;
- F at Constantia;
- G at Cohocton, Avoca and Wayland;
- H. at Bath;
- I in Allegany County; and
- K at Camden, Annsville, Lee, Paris, Westmoreland, Verona, Vernon and Vienna; and
- Second Company K, at Florence, Camden, Boonville, Avon, Westmoreland, Verona, Rome and Utica.

Four companies left the State September 18; the remaining companies October 23. The regiment served in the 2d Brigade, 1st Division, 5th Corps; and was honorably discharged and mustered out May 30 and June 1, 1865, near Washington, D. C. On January 11, 1865, Companies H and K went down the Jerusalem Plank Road (now a portion of U.S. Highway 301 near Petersburg known as the Crater Road) on a foraging expedition, where Confederate guerillas ambushed them and wounded Captain Burrage Rice, who was apparently executed by the guerillas after sending the train and men back to Union lines.

== Total strength and casualties ==
During its service the regiment lost by death, killed in action, 1 officer, 5 enlisted men; of wounds received in action, 3 enlisted men; of disease and other causes, 1 officer, 70 enlisted men; total, 2 officers, 78 enlisted men; aggregate, 80.

== Commanders ==
- Colonel William A. Olmstead
- Colonel William W. Hayt
- Colonel Allen L. Burr

== See also ==
- List of New York Civil War regiments
