= Friendship Free Library =

- U.S. National Register of Historic Places
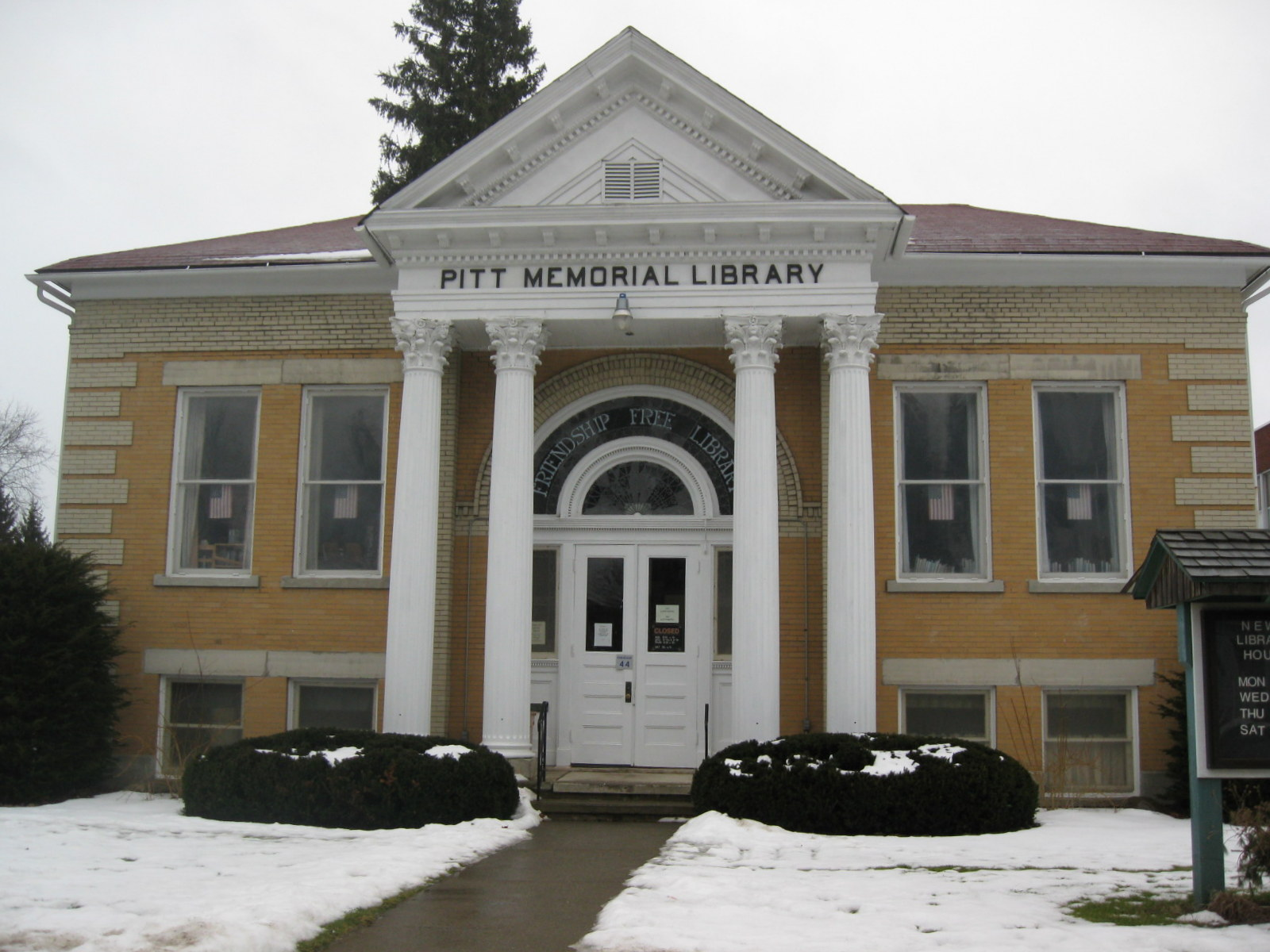
- Friendship Free Library, January 2010

- Location within New York Location within the United States
- Interactive map showing the location for Friendship Free Library
- Location: 40 W. Main St., Friendship, New York
- Coordinates: 42°12′25″N 78°8′6″W
- Area: less than one acre
- Built: 1912
- Architect: Otis Dockstader
- Architectural style: Classical Revival, Arts and Crafts
- NRHP reference No.: 08000769
- Added to NRHP: August 15, 2008

Friendship Free Library, also known as Pitt Memorial Library, is a historic library building located at Friendship in Allegany County, New York. Constructed of yellow brick in 1912, and designed by Otis Dockstader of Elmira, the building is composed of a five-by-two bay, one-story main block, with a large four-by-four bay block to the rear. The building features Arts and Crafts style decorative elements. The entrance is sheltered by a monumental gabled portico supported by four Corinthian columns.

It was listed on the National Register of Historic Places in 2008.

== Library History ==
While the current home of the Friendship Free Library at 40 W Main St. has housed the collection for over a century, the library had much humbler beginnings. Like many 19th and 20th-century American libraries, the Friendship Free Library was established through generous donations and volunteer work from community women. In 1898, the library was proposed by the Anna Shaw Club, a local women's organization in Friendship. To fund the project, the Anna Shaw Club partnered with three other Women's clubs in Friendship: the Progressive Club, the Traveler's Club, and the Musical Literary Society. The library was officially opened in 1897, operating out of a single room for rent on Depot St.

By 1901, the Friendship Free Library was one of eight public circulating libraries in Alleghany County. The collection held over 2,000 books, and in 1901, over 8,000 books were circulated among 1,000 patrons. Over the years, the library moved several more times in 1902 and 1906 before finding its permanent home in 1912. As the women's clubs of Friendship still ran the library, this relocation would not have been possible without the $12,000 endowment donated by Mrs. William H. Pitt, thus giving the building its secondary name, the Pitt Memorial Library. The library re-opened its doors in 1912, still operating out of the historic building today.
