= Wirt, New York =

- Town
- Location within New York Location within the United States
- Coordinates: 42°7′13″N 78°8′3″W
- Country: United States
- State: New York
- County: Allegany

Government
  - Type: Town Council
  - Town Supervisor: Larry Bedow
  - Town Council: Members' List: • Michael Scott (D, R); • Richard Kozlowski (D, R); • Tricia Grover (D); • Shawn Dunmire ()

Area
  - Total: 36.00 sq mi (93.23 km^{2})
  - Land: 35.93 sq mi (93.06 km^{2})
  - Water: 0.066 sq mi (0.17 km^{2})
- Elevation: 1,896 ft (578 m)

Population (2020)
  - Total: 1,059 ▼
  - Estimate (2021): 1,048
  - Density: 29.8/sq mi (11.52/km^{2})
- Time zone: UTC-5 (Eastern (EST))
  - Summer (DST): UTC-4 (EDT)
- ZIP Codes: 14715 (Bolivar); 14739 (Friendship); 14774 (Richburg); 14880 (Scio); 14895 (Wellsville)
- FIPS code: 36-003-82623
- GNIS feature ID: 0979651
- Website: https://wirtny.gov/

Wirt is a town in Allegany County, New York, United States. The population was 1,059 at the 2020 census. The town is in the southwest part of the county and east of Olean.

== History ==
The area that would become the town was first settled circa 1812. The town of Wirt was created in 1838 from parts of the towns of Bolivar and Friendship.

== Geography ==
According to the United States Census Bureau, the town has a total area of 36.00 square miles (93.25 km^{2}), of which 35.94 square miles (93.08 km^{2}) is land and 0.066 square miles (0.17 km^{2}), or 0.18%, is water.

New York State Route 275 is a major north–south highway through the town.

== Demographics ==
Historical population
Census	Pop.	Note	%±
1840	1,207		—
1850	1,544		27.9%
1860	1,390		−10.0%
1870	1,204		−13.4%
1880	1,225		1.7%
1890	1,219		−0.5%
1900	1,163		−4.6%
1910	1,209		4.0%
1920	974		−19.4%
1930	1,269		30.3%
1940	1,348		6.2%
1950	1,243		−7.8%
1960	1,117		−10.1%
1970	1,094		−2.1%
1980	1,137		3.9%
1990	1,143		0.5%
2000	1,215		6.3%
2010	1,111		−8.6%
2020	1,059		−4.7%
2021 (est.)	1,048		−1.0%
U.S. Decennial Census

As of the census of 2000, there were 1,215 people, 446 households, and 323 families residing in the town. The population density was 33.8 inhabitants per square mile (13.1/km^{2}). There were 669 housing units at an average density of 18.6 units per square mile (7.2 units/km^{2}). The racial makeup of the town was 97.94% White, 0.33% Black or African American, 0.08% Native American, 0.25% Asian, none Pacific Islander, 0.49% from other races, and 0.91% from two or more races. None of the population are Hispanic or Latino of any race.

There were 446 households, out of which 33.6% had children under the age of 18 living with them, 56.7% were married couples living together, 9.6% had a female householder with no husband present, and 27.4% were non-families. 23.3% of all households were made up of individuals, and 11.0% had someone living alone who was 65 years of age or older. The average household size was 2.72 and the average family size was 3.13.

In the town, the population was spread out, with 30.5% under the age of 18, 7.1% from 18 to 24, 27.3% from 25 to 44, 22.4% from 45 to 64, and 12.7% who were 65 years of age or older. The median age was 35 years. For every 100 females, there were 99.5 males. For every 100 females age 18 and over, there were 101.9 males.

The median income for a household in the town was $28,456, and the median income for a family was $32,222. Males had a median income of $27,321 versus $23,958 for females. The per capita income for the town was $12,387. About 12.3% of families and 14.8% of the population were below the poverty line, including 17.4% of those under age 18 and 6.1% of those age 65 or over.

== Communities and locations in the Town of Wirt ==
- Inavale – a location on the east town line
- Richburg – part of the village of Richburg is at the south town line
- West Notch – hamlet south of Wirt hamlet on County Road 34 (West Notch Road)
- Wirt – hamlet located on County Road 34 (West Notch Road and Evans Street) north of Richburg
