= Bolivar Free Library =

- U.S. National Register of Historic Places
- Location within New York Location within the United States
- Location: 390 Main St., Bolivar, New York
- Coordinates: 42°4′25.086″N 78°9′49.2876″W
- Area: less than one acre
- Built: 1910
- Architect: Prichell, E.F.
- Architectural style: Mission/Spanish Revival
- NRHP reference No.: 03000606
- Added to NRHP: July 05, 2003

Bolivar Free Library is a historic Carnegie library building located at Bolivar in Allegany County, New York. It is one of 3,000 such libraries constructed between 1885 and 1919. Carnegie provided $5,000 toward the construction of the Bolivar Free Library. It is a 48-by-32-foot (14.6 by 9.8 m), Mission style structure constructed 1910–1911.

It was listed on the National Register of Historic Places in 2003.
