= Drum Raceway =

Defunct auto racing venue near Allentown, New York

- Location: Alma, New York
- Coordinates: 42.0944°N 78.0882°W
- Operator: Wilfred Washer Jr.
- Broke ground: 1969
- Opened: 1970
- Closed: 1979
- Surface: Dirt
- Length: .536 km (0.333 mi)

Drum Raceway was a 1/3-mile (0.54 km) dirt oval racing facility located in the Southern Tier Region of New York State.

== Overview ==
In 1969 Wilfred Washer Jr. built a snowmobile racetrack on Drum Road in the Town of Alma, New York about two miles northwest from NY 417. The Olean Speedway, just 20 miles west, shut down at the end of that same year, prompting the enhancement of Drum Raceway for stock car racing in time for the 1970 season. The raceway became part of a weekend circuit with Bradford Speedway in Pennsylvania and Woodhull Raceway in Steuben County, New York.

In July 1979 an unauthorized driver entered the track late at night in a personal vehicle and lost control of the car, which then flipped over. One passenger suffered a broken neck and jointly sued the driver and the raceway. The racetrack closed after that season, and folklore is that the facility closed because the injured passenger won his lawsuit.

This story gained national attention when Dale Earnhardt Jr. mentioned it in preliminary research for his Lost Speedways television documentary series produced by Peacock. However, the lawsuit was settled with the car's driver.
