= Bolivar, New York =

- Town
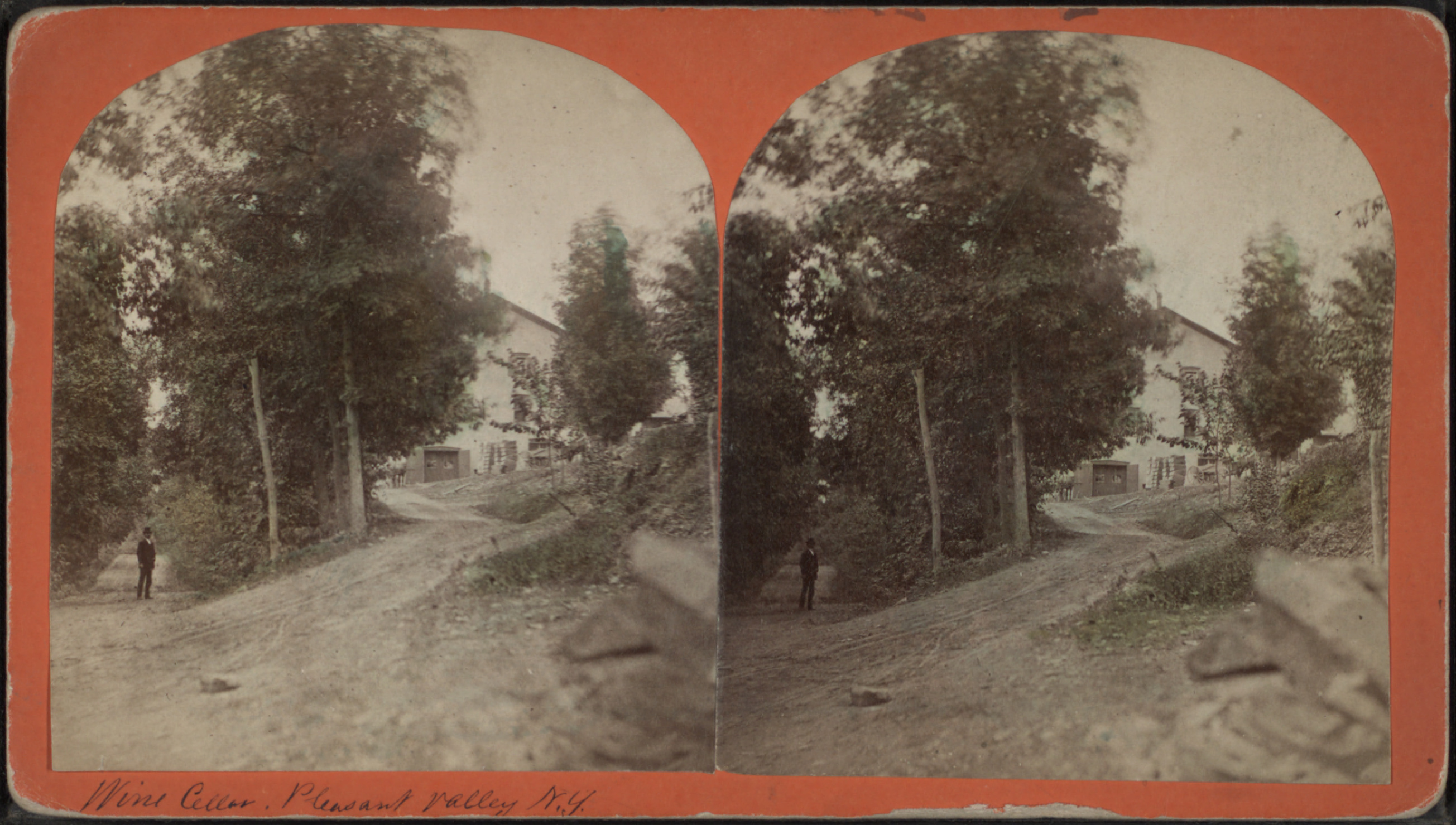
- Wine Cellar, Pleasant Valley, N.Y.

- Seal
- Motto: "Land of the Deer and the Derrick"
- Location within New York Location within the United States
- Coordinates: 42°04′00″N 78°10′04″W
- Country: United States
- State: New York
- County: Allegany

Government
  - Type: Town Council
  - Town Supervisor: Ricky Gould (D, R)
  - Town Council: Members: • Sharon Evingham (D, R); • Bud Wittenburg (D, R); • Randy Iantorno (D, R); • Bob Ingalls ()

Area
  - Total: 35.88 sq mi (92.93 km^{2})
  - Land: 35.87 sq mi (92.90 km^{2})
  - Water: 0.012 sq mi (0.03 km^{2})

Population (2020)
  - Total: 2,051 ▼
  - Estimate (2021): 2,030
  - Density: 58.2/sq mi (22.48/km^{2})
- Time zone: UTC-5 (Eastern (EST))
  - Summer (DST): UTC-4 (EDT)
- ZIP Codes: 14715 (Bolivar); 14708 (Alma); 14754 (Little Genesee)
- FIPS code: 36-07201
- Website: townofbolivar.com

Bolivar (/ˈbɒlɪvər/ BOL-i-vər) is a town in Allegany County, New York, United States. The population was 2,051 at the 2020 census. The town is named after Simón Bolívar.

Bolivar is on the south border of the county and is east of Olean. There is also a village of Bolivar in the town.

As "the heart of the Allegany Oil Field" the Bolivar-Richburg area rose to significance during the oil boom era of the late 1800s. During the brief initial oil boom of the 1880s it was purportedly the wealthiest locale, per capita, in the United States. By the early 1900s the initial boom, with its economic and population impacts, had significantly faded, but secondary oil recovery techniques applied to the oil fields (starting around 1920) drastically rejuvenated the industry in the area.

== Geography ==
According to the United States Census Bureau, the town has a total area of 35.9 square miles (92.9 km^{2}), of which 0.012 square miles (0.03 km^{2}), or 0.03%, is water.

The south town line is the border of Pennsylvania.

New York State Route 275 terminates at New York State Route 417 in the village of Bolivar.

Bolivar was served (1881–1947) by the Pittsburg, Shawmut & Northern Railroad (PS&N) and predecessors, (1881–1893) by the Bradford, Eldred & Cuba Railroad System (BE&C), and (1903–1926) by the Olean, Bradford & Salamanca Railway (OB&S) and predecessors. The early PS&N predecessors and the BE&C were 36" narrow-gauge railroads while the PS&N and OB&S were standard-gauge railroads, the latter being electric-powered.

=== Adjacent towns and areas ===
To the south is Potter County, Pennsylvania. The east town line is shared by the town of Alma, and the west town line is shared with the town of Genesee. The town of Wirt is to the north.

== Demographics ==
Historical population
Census	Pop.	Note	%±
1830	449		—
1840	408		−9.1%
1850	708		73.5%
1860	959		35.5%
1870	959		0.0%
1880	1,029		7.3%
1890	2,233		117.0%
1900	2,035		−8.9%
1910	2,282		12.1%
1920	1,979		−13.3%
1930	2,813		42.1%
1940	2,628		−6.6%
1950	2,680		2.0%
1960	2,441		−8.9%
1970	2,391		−2.0%
1980	2,496		4.4%
1990	2,361		−5.4%
2000	2,223		−5.8%
2010	2,189		−1.5%
2020	2,051		−6.3%
2021 (est.)	2,030	▼	−1.0%
U.S. Decennial Census

As of the census of 2000, there were 2,223 people, 844 households, and 602 families residing in the town. The population density was 62.0 inhabitants per square mile (23.9/km^{2}). There were 5,300 housing units at an average density of 28.1 per square mile (10.8/km^{2}). The racial makeup of the town was 98.83% White, 0.36% Black or African American, 0.09% Native American, 0.09% Asian, 0.09% from other races, and 0.54% from two or more races. Hispanic or Latino of any race were 0.13% of the population.

There were 844 households, out of which 37.7% had children under the age of 18 living with them, 53.4% were married couples living together, 11.5% had a female householder with no husband present, and 28.6% were non-families. 24.4% of all households were made up of individuals, and 12.1% had someone living alone who was 65 years of age or older. The average household size was 2.63 and the average family size was 3.14.

In the town, the population was spread out, with 29.9% under the age of 18, 8.3% from 18 to 24, 26.3% from 25 to 44, 21.7% from 45 to 64, and 13.8% who were 65 years of age or older. The median age was 36 years. For every 100 females, there were 98.3 males. For every 100 females age 18 and over, there were 96.5 males.

The median income for a household in the town was $33,017, and the median income for a family was $38,750. Males had a median income of $30,449 versus $18,889 for females. The per capita income for the town was $13,766. About 13.9% of families and 16.0% of the population were below the poverty line, including 23.6% of those under age 18 and 6.8% of those age 65 or over.

== Communities and locations in the Town of Bolivar ==
- Bolivar – The village of Bolivar is in the northwest corner of the town at the junction of Routes 275(Main Street) and 417(Wellsville Street).
- Hoben – A hamlet east of South Bolivar on County road 18 (Brimmer Brook Road) near the south town line.
- Honeoye Creek – A stream in the south part of the town.
- Kossuth – A hamlet on Route 417(Wellsville Street) in the center of the town.
- Little Genesee Creek – A stream flowing through the northwest part of the town past Richburg and Bolivar village.
- Richburg – The south part of the village of Richburg is on the north town line and northeast of Bolivar village on Route 275.
- Sawyer – A hamlet by Route 417(Wellsville Street) east of Kossuth.
- South Bolivar – A hamlet at the junction of County roads 33 (South Bolivar Road) and 18(Petrolia Road) near the Pennsylvania border. The community was also known as "Honeoye Corners" and "Honeoye Forks" due to its location near Honeoye Creek.
- Vosburg – A location on Route 417 at the east town line.
