= Scio =

Scio or SCIO may refer to:

== Places ==
- Chios (Genoese: Scio), a Greek island in the Aegean Sea

=== United States ===
- Scio, New York, a town
  - Scio (CDP), New York, the primary settlement in the town
- Scio, Ohio
- Scio, Oregon
- Scio Township, Michigan
  - Scio, Michigan, an unincorporated community

== Other uses ==
- Science Olympiad, an American elementary, middle, and high school team competition that focuses on various science topics and engineering ability
- Scottish charitable incorporated organisation, a type of charity in Scotland
- State Council Information Office, external name of the Central Propaganda Department of the Chinese Communist Party
