= Friendship, New York =

- Town
- Location within the state of New York
- Coordinates: 42°12′34″N 78°8′8″W
- Country: United States
- State: New York
- County: Allegany

Government
  - Type: Town Council
  - Town Supervisor: Bradley Boulovet (D)
  - Town Council: Members' List: • Michael McCarthy (D); • Raymond Foster (D); • Sue Strickley (D); • Sue Myers (R)

Area
  - Total: 36.23 sq mi (93.83 km^{2})
  - Land: 36.22 sq mi (93.80 km^{2})
  - Water: 0.012 sq mi (0.03 km^{2})
- Elevation: 1,670 ft (510 m)

Population (2020)
  - Total: 1,960
  - Estimate (2021): 1,946
  - Density: 52.8/sq mi (20.38/km^{2})
- Time zone: UTC-5 (Eastern (EST))
  - Summer (DST): UTC-4 (EDT)
- ZIP Codes: 14739 (Friendship); 14813 (Belmont)
- Area code: 585
- FIPS code: 36-003-27705
- GNIS feature ID: 0978978
- Website: friendshipny.gov

Friendship is a town in Allegany County, New York, United States. The population was 1,960 at the 2020 census. The town's name was adopted to mark the resolution of earlier conflicts.

Friendship is near the center of Allegany County and is northeast of the city of Olean.

== History ==
The region was first settled by Euro-Americans around 1806. Originally, the town gained the name of "Bloody Corners" due to the high incidence of feuding, and alleged weekend fights. "The finer citizens took offense, went to the other extreme and officially named it Friendship. In the southern end of the town is the hamlet of Nile. It is believed the named derived from the wishes of early settlers, many of who were Seventh Day Baptists." The town of Friendship was formed in 1815 from part of the town of Caneadea. Later, new towns were formed from parts of Friendship: Cuba (1822), Bolivar (1825) and a part of Wirt (1838).

Many of the original wood structures in Friendship village were destroyed in fires in the 1870s and replaced with brick building. The Hyde House Garden from the Friendship of 1870 has been moved to the Genesee Country Museum.

The Wellman House was listed on the National Register of Historic Places in 1974. The Friendship Free Library was listed in 2008.

In 2015, the town of Friendship celebrated its bicentennial.

== Geography ==
According to the United States Census Bureau, the town has a total area of 36.2 square miles (93.8 km^{2}), of which 0.012 square miles (0.03 km^{2}), or 0.04%, is water.

The Southern Tier Expressway (Interstate 86 and New York State Route 17) passes across the town and intersects New York State Route 275 at Friendship village.

== Demographics ==
Historical population
Census	Pop.	Note	%±
1820	662		—
1830	1,502		126.9%
1840	1,244		−17.2%
1850	1,675		34.6%
1860	1,889		12.8%
1870	1,528		−19.1%
1880	2,127		39.2%
1890	2,216		4.2%
1900	2,136		−3.6%
1910	2,100		−1.7%
1920	1,788		−14.9%
1930	1,868		4.5%
1940	1,932		3.4%
1950	2,182		12.9%
1960	2,020		−7.4%
1970	2,106		4.3%
1980	2,164		2.8%
1990	2,185		1.0%
2000	1,927		−11.8%
2010	2,004		4.0%
2020	1,960		−2.2%
2021 (est.)	1,946	▼	−0.7%
U.S. Decennial Census

As of the census of 2000, there were 1,927 people, 770 households, and 514 families residing in the town. The population density was 53.2 inhabitants per square mile (20.5/km^{2}). There were 994 housing units at an average density of 27.4 per square mile (10.6/km^{2}). The racial makeup of the town was 96.57% White, 1.87% Black or African American, 0.10% Native American, 0.16% Asian, 0.57% from other races, and 0.73% from two or more races. Hispanic or Latino of any race were 0.57% of the population.

There were 770 households, out of which 28.6% had children under the age of 18 living with them, 51.7% were married couples living together, 10.5% had a female householder with no husband present, and 33.2% were non-families. 27.4% of all households were made up of individuals, and 12.5% had someone living alone who was 65 years of age or older. The average household size was 2.50 and the average family size was 3.04.

In the town, the population was spread out, with 26.2% under the age of 18, 8.7% from 18 to 24, 26.8% from 25 to 44, 23.0% from 45 to 64, and 15.3% who were 65 years of age or older. The median age was 36 years. For every 100 females, there were 99.1 males. For every 100 females age 18 and over, there were 94.5 males.

The median income for a household in the town was $26,439, and the median income for a family was $33,542. Males had a median income of $26,440 versus $22,132 for females. The per capita income for the town was $12,552. About 17.1% of families and 21.5% of the population were below the poverty line, including 28.0% of those under age 18 and 7.5% of those age 65 or over.

== Notable people ==
- Clarence A. Buskirk, Indiana Attorney General, promoter of Christian Science
- Rube Kroh, former MLB player
- Margaret Shulock, cartoonist
- Sidney Rigdon, early Latter Day Saint movement notable

== Communities and locations in Friendship ==
- Friendship – A hamlet and census-designated place in the center of the town next to the Southern Tier Expressway and Van Campen Creek. Routes 17 and 275 and County Roads 20 and 31 converge in the hamlet. Friendship is a former village that dissolved its municipal corporation in 1977.
- Higgins – A location near the east town line on Route 20.
- Nile – A hamlet near the south town line on Route 275, at the intersection of County Roads 1 and 34, south of Friendship hamlet.
- Van Campen Creek – The stream flows through the town toward the Genesee River.

== See also ==
- Genesee Country Village and Museum
