= Richburg =

Richburg may refer to:

- Richburg, New York
- Richburg, South Carolina
- Weston Richburg, American football player
