= New York State Route 275 =

State highway in Allegany County, New York, US

New York State Route 275
- Map of Allegany County with NY 275 highlighted in red

Route information
- Maintained by NYSDOT
- Length: 11.47 mi (18.46 km)
- Existed: 1930–present

Major junctions
- South end: NY 417 in Bolivar
- North end: I-86 / NY 17 / Southern Tier Expressway in Friendship

Location
- Country: United States
- State: New York
- Counties: Allegany

Highway system
- New York Highways; Interstate; US; State; Reference; Parkways
← NY 274	→ NY 276

New York State Route 275 (NY 275) is a north–south state highway in Allegany County, New York, in the United States. It runs for 11.47 miles (18.46 km), connecting the village of Bolivar and NY 417 at its southern end with the hamlet of Friendship to the north, where it intersects the Southern Tier Expressway (NY 17 and Interstate 86 or I-86) by way of an interchange. The road continues north past the interchange to NY 19 in Belfast as County Route 17 (CR 17). NY 275 was assigned as part of the 1930 renumbering of state highways in New York to the portion of its routing south of Friendship. It was extended slightly northward in July 1974 to connect to the Southern Tier Expressway.

== Route description ==
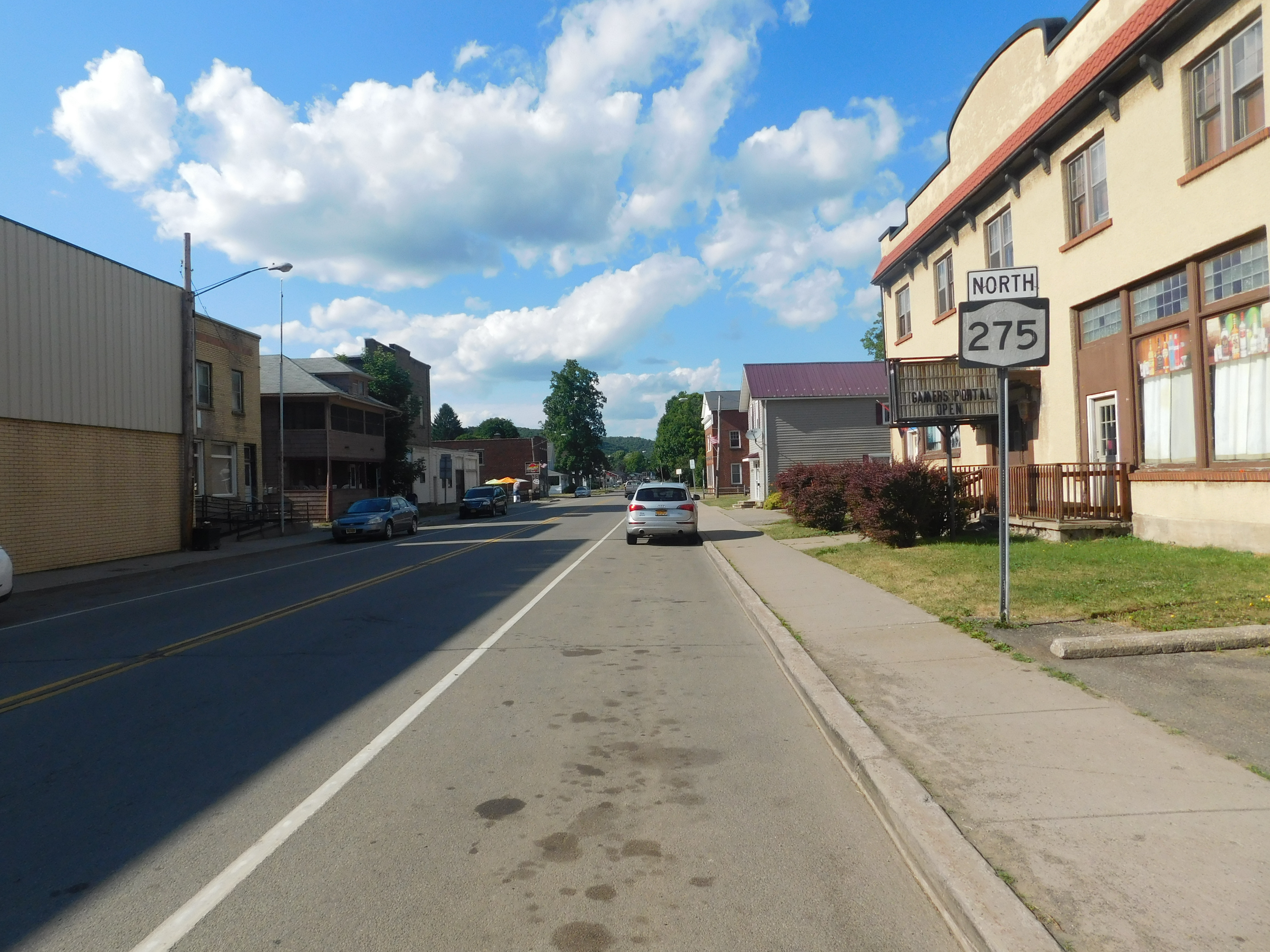
NY 275 northbound through the village of Bolivar

NY 275 begins at the intersection of Wellsville and Main streets in the village of Bolivar. At this point, NY 417 switches from South Main Street to Wellsville Street while NY 275 proceeds northeastward on the two-lane Main Street. The route initially passes by commercial buildings in the village's business district; however, they quickly give way to more residential areas after just two blocks. As the highway heads away from the village center, the homes become scattered ahead of intersections with the eastern terminus of County Route 5A (CR 5A, named Salt Rising Road) and the south end of CR 40 (Deans Flat Road). The rural trend soon reverses as NY 275 enters the adjacent village of Richburg. Here, NY 275 is also known as Main Street as it serves Richburg's business district and the surrounding residential neighborhoods.

Past Richburg, NY 275 continues on a northeasterly track through the rural town of Wirt, running along the base of a narrow, largely undeveloped valley surrounding Little Genesee Creek as East Notch Road. The highway slowly increases in elevation for about 2.5 miles (4.0 km), intersecting with the western terminus of CR 8 (Inavale Road) and passing a handful of farms on its way toward East Notch, a gap between two large hills that serves as Little Genesee Creek's source. It eventually turns north to traverse the pass before winding its way down the opposite side. A short distance later, NY 275 intersects with the northern terminus of CR 8 as it curves to take a northwesterly track into the town of Friendship.

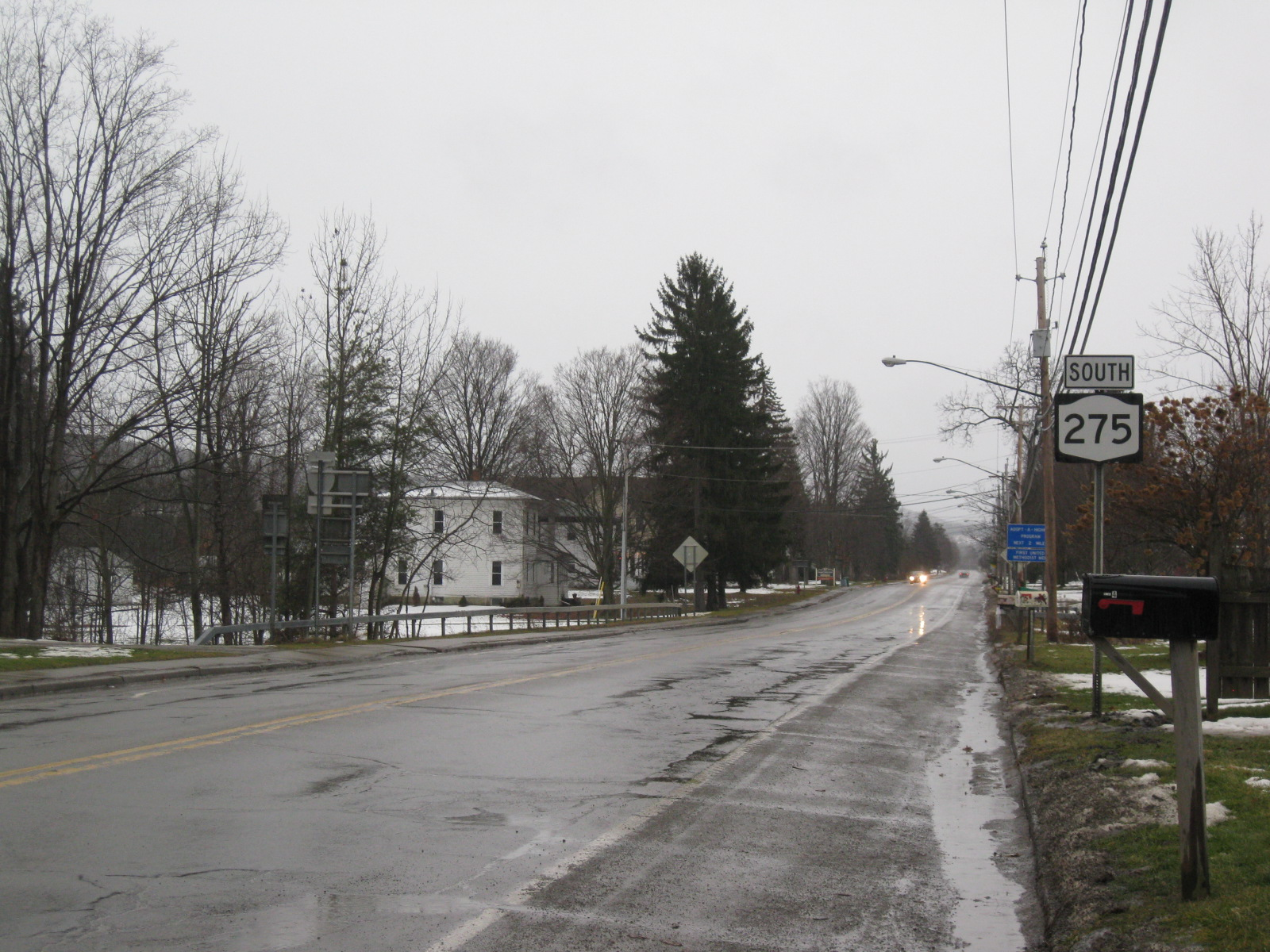
NY 275 southbound just after the junction with CR 20 in the hamlet of Friendship

Just north of the town line, NY 275 enters the hamlet of Nile, where it becomes a two-lane residential street named Pennsylvania Avenue. In the center of the community, the route meets the east end of CR 1 (Fifth Avenue). From here, NY 275 bends back to the north, crossing through rural sections of the town of Friendship mostly populated by farms. The rural surroundings end ahead of the hamlet of Friendship, where NY 275 heads through the residential western portion of the community. Near the center of Friendship, the highway intersects CR 20 (West Main Street), the primary east–west street through the hamlet. NY 275 continues on, crossing over the Norfolk Southern Railway's Southern Tier Line (formerly the Erie Railroad's Main Line) to reach exit 29 of the Southern Tier Expressway (I-86 and NY 17). NY 275 ends at the exit ramp leading away from the westbound direction of the freeway; however, NY 275's right-of-way continues north to NY 19 in Belfast as CR 17.

== History ==
NY 275 was assigned as part of the 1930 renumbering of state highways in New York to the portion of its modern alignment between the village of Bolivar and the hamlet of Friendship. At the time, NY 275's northern terminus was at its intersection with West Main Street (now CR 20) in Friendship, then part of NY 63 and later NY 408. In the early 1970s, the portion of the Southern Tier Expressway near Friendship was completed and opened to traffic. However, NY 275 continued to end at NY 408 in Friendship until the mid-1970s when NY 408 was truncated to Nunda. As a result, NY 275 was extended a short distance northward to meet the Southern Tier Expressway at exit 29.

In 1964, the New York State Department of Public Works proposed trading over 80 miles (130 km) of roads that were not managing 1,000 or more cars daily for the construction of 30 miles (48 km) of the Southern Tier Expressway (NY 17). This list of proposed transfers included NY 275, NY 244, NY 248 and its spur, NY 248A in their entirety and sections of NY 408, NY 70 and NY 19. In August 1964, the county declined to sign the offer. On July 1, 1974, NY 275 was extended north to the newly-constructed Southern Tier Expressway.

== Major intersections ==
The entire route is in Allegany County.

Location	mi	km	Destinations	Notes
Village of Bolivar	0.00	0.00	NY 417 (Wellsville Road / South Main Street)	Southern terminus
Friendship			CR 20 (West Main Street) – Belmont, Cuba, Friendship	Formerly part of NY 408; hamlet of Friendship
Friendship	11.47	18.46	I-86 / NY 17 / Southern Tier Expressway – Jamestown, Binghamton	Northern terminus; exit 29 (I-86 / NY 17)
1.000 mi = 1.609 km; 1.000 km = 0.621 mi
