= Friendship (CDP), New York =

Friendship, New York
- Census-designated place
- Location within the state of New York
- Coordinates: 42°12′27″N 78°8′23″W
- Country: United States
- State: New York
- County: Allegany
- Town: Friendship

Area
  - Total: 2.89 sq mi (7.48 km^{2})
  - Land: 2.89 sq mi (7.48 km^{2})
  - Water: 0 sq mi (0.00 km^{2})
- Elevation: 1,506 ft (459 m)

Population (2020)
  - Total: 1,085
  - Density: 375.6/sq mi (145.02/km^{2})
- Time zone: UTC-5 (Eastern (EST))
  - Summer (DST): UTC-4 (EDT)
- ZIP code: 14739
- Area code: 585
- FIPS code: 36-27694
- GNIS feature ID: 0950738

Friendship is a hamlet (and census-designated place) in Allegany County, New York, United States. The population was 1,218 at the 2010 census. The community is the principal settlement in the town of Friendship.

== Geography ==
Friendship hamlet is in the center of the town and is next to the Southern Tier Expressway (Interstate 86 and New York State Route 17) and Van Campen Creek. The community is served by expressway exit 29, with State Route 275. County Routes 17, 20, 31, and State Route 275 converge in the hamlet. It is located on the mainline of the Western New York and Pennsylvania Railroad.

According to the United States Census Bureau, the CDP has a total area of 2.9 square miles (7.5 km^{2}), all land.

== History ==
Although formerly a village, Friendship dissolved its municipal corporation in 1977.

== Demographics ==
Historical population
Census	Pop.	Note	%±
2020	1,085		—
U.S. Decennial Census

As of the census of 2000, there were 1,176 people, 464 households, and 308 families residing in the CDP. The population density was 427.4 inhabitants per square mile (165.0/km^{2}). There were 535 housing units at an average density of 194.4 per square mile (75.1/km^{2}). The racial makeup of the CDP was 94.98% White, 2.89% Black or African American, 0.17% Native American, 0.09% Asian, 0.85% from other races, and 1.02% from two or more races. Hispanic or Latino of any race were 0.85% of the population.

There were 464 households, out of which 28.9% had children under the age of 18 living with them, 50.2% were married couples living together, 12.5% had a female householder with no husband present, and 33.6% were non-families. 27.8% of all households were made up of individuals, and 13.1% had someone living alone who was 65 years of age or older. The average household size was 2.53 and the average family size was 3.09.

In the CDP, the population was spread out, with 27.5% under the age of 18, 9.0% from 18 to 24, 27.3% from 25 to 44, 20.7% from 45 to 64, and 15.5% who were 65 years of age or older. The median age was 35 years. For every 100 females, there were 95.7 males. For every 100 females age 18 and over, there were 90.0 males.

The median income for a household in the CDP was $25,524, and the median income for a family was $31,442. Males had a median income of $26,196 versus $14,554 for females. The per capita income for the CDP was $11,182. About 20.8% of families and 25.7% of the population were below the poverty line, including 33.3% of those under age 18 and 7.9% of those age 65 or over.
