= Hamilton Hobart Stow =

American oil well operator

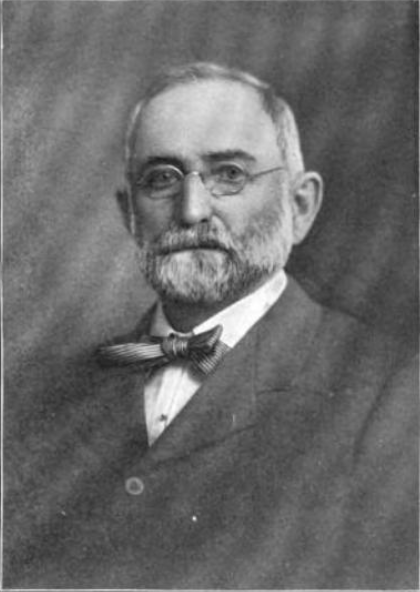
- Born: June 25, 1837; Olean, New York
- Died: November 21, 1905 (aged 68)
- Occupation: Oil well operator
- Years active: 1860s–1905

Hamilton Hobart Stow (June 25, 1837 – November 21, 1905) was an American oil well operator.

== Biography ==
Stow was born on June 25, 1837, in Olean, New York. His parents, Hamilton and Sally Stow, were of English descent. He received his early education at Newtown, Pennsylvania, and Tionesta, Pennsylvania, and attended Allegheny College in Meadville for one year.

Stow married Amanda P. Scott, of Buffalo, New York, in 1859. They had three children together.

In 1862, Stow helped form the firm of Van Vleck & Stow, which later operated over 200 active oil wells. Van Vleck & Stow was described as "one of the largest in this part of the country." He was later a member of the Western Oil Men's Association, the Oil Exchange of Toledo, and the Toledo Yachting Association.

Stow was engaged in lumber business with his father from 1864 to 1872 in Tionesta, later moving to Cincinnati where they operated extensive lumber yards.

In 1876, Stow became the superintendent of the Setron Coal Mining Company located at Hartford City, West Virginia.

In 1879, Stow purchased oil lands at Bedford, Pennsylvania, and in 1889 he purchased oil fields near Toledo, Ohio, where he was one of the firm at Van Vleck & Stow.

Stow died on November 21, 1905, at the age of 68. He had been in ill health for the prior four years. An obituary in The Forest Republican wrote:

"When here he was one of the best known and deservedly popular and generally beloved men of the oil regions. His frankness, generosity and open-heartedness where proverbial. Among business men he was esteemed for his honesty and ability. The poor had a friend in him. His social qualities, cordial manner, kindly word, were qualities that conspired to encircle him with a large and varied circle of friends. The esteem in which he was held by the people when here is evidenced by the great number of people whom he had befriended naming their children for him because they considered his an honest name."
