= Oak Hill Park Historic District =

Historic district in New York, United States

- U.S. National Register of Historic Places
- U.S. Historic district
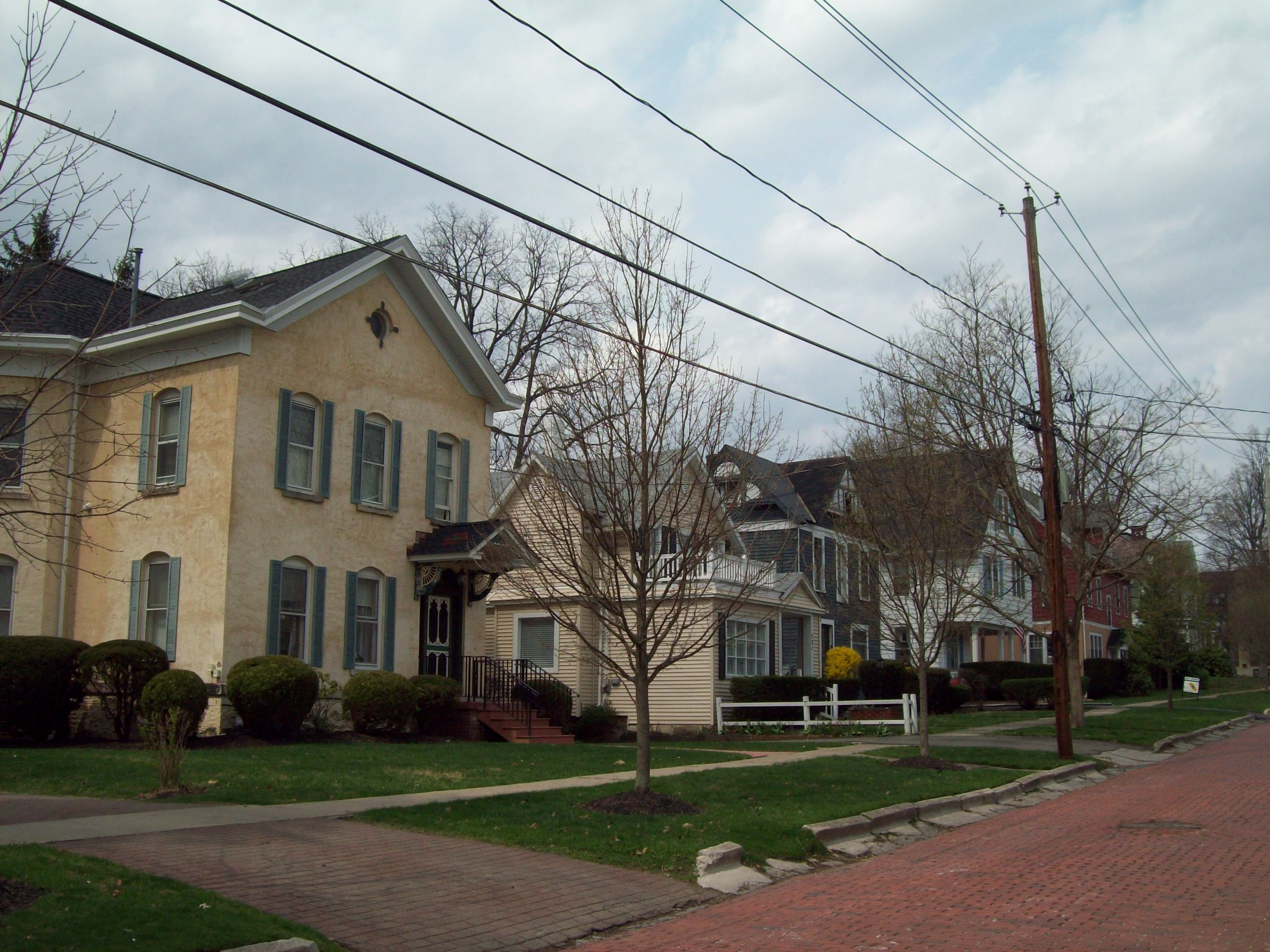
- Oak Hill Park Historic District, April 2010

- Location within New York Location within the United States
- Location: Roughly along Laurens, N. Second, Third, Fourth, and W. Sullivan Sts., Olean, New York
- Coordinates: 42°4′50″N 78°26′4″W
- Architect: Robinson, Charles M.; Schoenberg, A.W.E.
- Architectural style: Greek Revival, Italianate, Queen Anne
- NRHP reference No.: 97001495
- Added to NRHP: December 01, 1997

Oak Hill Park Historic District is a historic district located at Olean in Cattaraugus County, New York. The 32.5-acre (132,000 m^{2}) district encompasses 89 properties including 82 residences, two churches, one school (the Olean High School), and a landscape design. There are 76 contributing buildings. The structures reflect a variety of mid-late 19th-century and early 20th-century architectural styles including Queen Anne, Italianate, and Gothic Revival styles. The structures were constructed between about 1849 and 1937.

It was listed on the National Register of Historic Places in 1997.
