= Olean High School =

Location
- 410 W. Sullivan Street, Olean, New York 14760; 42°04′57″N 78°26′05″W

Information
- Type: Public High School
- School district: Olean City School District
- NCES School ID: 362172003082
- Principal: Jeffrey Andreano
- Staff: 47.89 (FTE)
- Grades: 8-12
- Student to teacher ratio: 15.85
- Colors: Red and Gold
- Athletics: Olean Huskies
- Mascot: Husky
- Affiliation: BOCES
- Accreditation: Middle States Association of Colleges and Schools
- Nicknames: Home of the Huskies
- Website: ohs.oleanschools.org

Olean High School is a high school located in Olean, New York, about 65 miles south of Buffalo, New York.

Olean High School was built in 1935 and opened on February 22, 1937. It is known for its athletics programs. It also has numerous clubs, including Model United Nations, DECA, and Interact Club. It is located within the Oak Hill Park Historic District.

== 2012-2013 Restructuring ==
Due to economics hardships affecting the State of New York since the onset of the Great Recession, the school district began to see steep cuts from the state, and in order to maintain all of its operations, its budgets were continually downsized since 2008. The Olean City School District was restructured for the 2012-2013 School Year due to budget constraints. Olean High School was traditionally grades 9-12 up until the finish of the 2011–2012 academic year. Following the end of the 2012 academic year, Olean High School now operates as grades 8–12.

== Athletics ==
Olean High School offers golf, basketball, baseball, softball, football, volleyball, soccer, tennis, wrestling, cross country, swimming, cheerleading, and track and field.

== Alumni ==
- John Francis O'Hern, Bishop of Rochester
- Jeff Prescott, Wrestling, 3 time NYS champion, 2 time NCAA Wrestling Champion at Penn State
- Dr. Martial Knieser, served at Walter Reed 69-76. Developed the amniocentesis test for fetal lung development.

== See also ==
- 1974 Olean High School shooting
