= Richburg, New York =

- Village
- Location within New York Location within the United States
- Coordinates: 42°5′14″N 78°9′22″W
- Country: United States
- State: New York
- County: Allegany
- Towns: Wirt, Bolivar

Area
  - Total: 0.90 sq mi (2.33 km^{2})
  - Land: 0.90 sq mi (2.33 km^{2})
  - Water: 0 sq mi (0.00 km^{2})
- Elevation: 1,660 ft (506 m)

Population (2020)
  - Total: 401
  - Density: 450/sq mi (172/km^{2})
- Time zone: UTC-5 (Eastern (EST))
  - Summer (DST): UTC-4 (EDT)
- ZIP Codes: 14774 (Richburg); 14715 (Bolivar)
- Area code: 585
- FIPS code: 36-61434
- GNIS feature ID: 0962466
- Website: richburgny.org

Richburg is a village in Allegany County, New York, United States. As of the 2020 census, Richburg had a population of 401. The village is partly within the boundaries of the towns of Wirt and Bolivar. The community is east of Olean.

== History ==
Richburg was incorporated in 1881 and was for a time a petroleum "boom town". L. Frank Baum, later the author of The Wonderful Wizard of Oz and other stories, was manager of a theater, Baum's Opera House, in Richburg from 1881 to 1882. Baum's Opera House was built by Baum's father, an oil executive. Unfortunately, the theater burned in March 1882.

== Geography ==
Richburg is located in the southern part of Wirt and the northern part of Bolivar in southwestern Allegany County, at 42°5′14″N 78°9′22″W (42.087226, -78.156080).

Little Genesee Creek, part of the Allegheny River watershed, flows through the village, which is located at the junction of New York State Route 275 and County Road 40.

Richburg was served (1881–1890 and c.1906-1946) by the Pittsburg, Shawmut & Northern Railroad (PS&N) and predecessors, and (1881–1885) by the Bradford, Eldred & Cuba Railroad System (BE&C). The early PS&N predecessors and the BE&C were 36-inch (910 mm) narrow-gauge railroads, while the PS&N was a standard-gauge railroad. The Pittsburg, Shawmut & Northern Railroad embargoed operation through Richburg in 1946 and was abandoned by order of the Interstate Commerce Commission in 1946 to further promote highway motor truck transportation.

According to the United States Census Bureau, the village has a total area of 0.90 square miles (2.33 km^{2}), all land.

== Demographics ==
Historical population
Census	Pop.	Note	%±
1890	374		—
1900	343		−8.3%
1910	451		31.5%
1920	351		−22.2%
1930	580		65.2%
1940	564		−2.8%
1950	514		−8.9%
1960	493		−4.1%
1970	482		−2.2%
1980	494		2.5%
1990	494		0.0%
2000	448		−9.3%
2010	450		0.4%
2020	401		−10.9%
U.S. Decennial Census

As of the census of 2000, there were 448 people, 161 households, and 121 families residing in the village. The population density was 484.5 inhabitants per square mile (187.1/km^{2}). There were 191 housing units at an average density of 206.6 per square mile (79.8/km^{2}). The racial makeup of the village was 98.88% White, 0.45% African American, 0.22% Native American, 0.22% Asian, and 0.22% from two or more races. There are no Hispanics or Latinos of any race.

There were 161 households, out of which 41.0% had children under the age of 18 living with them, 59.6% were married couples living together, 9.9% had a female householder with no husband present, and 24.8% were non-families. 20.5% of all households were made up of individuals, and 13.7% had someone living alone who was 65 years of age or older. The average household size was 2.78 and the average family size was 3.23.

In the village, the population was spread out, with 31.0% under the age of 18, 8.9% from 18 to 24, 28.8% from 25 to 44, 18.1% from 45 to 64, and 13.2% who were 65 years of age or older. The median age was 33 years. For every 100 females, there were 89.8 males. For every 100 females age 18 and over, there were 95.6 males.

The median income for a household in the village was $21,750, and the median income for a family was $26,875. Males had a median income of $30,156 versus $15,938 for females. The per capita income for the village was $10,515. About 16.9% of families and 16.6% of the population were below the poverty line, including 18.8% of those under age 18 and 3.8% of those age 65 or over.

== Schools ==
Richburg is home to the Elementary Campus of the Bolivar-Richburg Central School District. Enrolling students in grades K - 5, the Bolivar-Richburg Elementary School provides an education for all students.
