= Olean City School District =

School district in the U.S. state of New York

The Olean City School District is a public school district located in Olean, New York. It includes two elementary schools, which serve grades Kindergarten-Grade 3:

- East View Elementary School (Built in 1973)
- Washington West Elementary School (Built in 1960)

There is a middle school known as the Olean Intermediate Middle School, serving grades 4–7. The former Olean Junior High school, now defunct, was built on the site of a former glass factory.

There is one high school known as the Olean High School. The school serves grades 8–12. In 1974, a mass shooting occurred there.

At Olean's population peak in the 1950s, the Olean City School District included 13 schools.

== 2012-2013 Restructuring ==
Olean City School District was restructured for the 2012–2013 school year due to the State of New York imposing a maximum property tax increase beginning in 2012. This caused major school changes:

- Olean High School was changed to an 8-12 school.
- Boardmanville Elementary School was closed.
- Ivers J. Norton Elementary School was closed.
- Olean Middle School was renamed "Olean Intermediate-Middle School," and became an intermediate school for grades 4–7.
