= Clifford Ulp =

Clifford McCormick Ulp
- Born: Clifford McCormick Ulp; 1885; Olean, New York
- Died: 1958 (aged 72–73)
- Known for: Painter; Teacher

Clifford McCormick Ulp (1885–1958) was one of Rochester's foremost professors of the arts during the first half of the 20th century.

== Early life ==
Clifford Ulp was born in Olean, New York, in 1885. He attended Rochester's East High School. He continued his studies at the Rochester Athenaeum and Mechanics Institute, or what is now known as Rochester Institute of Technology and graduated in 1908. He also attended the Art Students League in New York City on scholarship. Some of his more well known teachers included Charles H. Woodbury, Emile Gruppe and William Merritt Chase.

== Career ==
After studying at the Art Students League, Ulp returned to Rochester where he focused his work on illustration and advertising until 1913 when RIT hired him to teach illustration and drawing. He continued teaching there for the next 39 years. During the early years of his RIT career, Ulp's work could be frequently found in the pages of the Saturday Evening Post and Country Gentleman magazines. In 1920 he was appointed director of the arts for what is now known as the College of Imaging Arts and Sciences at RIT. During this time he introduced the use of motion pictures in a course called Models in Motion. He helped bring nature motifs indoors through the use of color slides. He served as director until his retirement in 1952. He was a popular public speaker and well-known figure in Rochester during the 1920s and early 1930s. He served as vice president of the Rochester Art Club from 1926 to 1927 and later served as president from 1927 to 1932. He served on the board of managers for the Rochester Memorial Art Gallery from 1928 to 1952. Although he worked many late nights at his 3rd floor studio he was still well known for being a family man. Ulp died in 1958 at the age of 72.

== Artwork ==
Clifford McCormick Ulp is remembered primarily for his landscape portrayals. He is also known for his religious works, murals, illustrations, and printmaking. Two styles of painting that fascinated Ulp were that of fresco and pastel. He enjoyed doing outdoor sketching in all kinds of weather, and would usually do an outdoor sketch each day which he would then have his family critique.
