= Alma, New York =

- Town
- Location within New York Location within the United States
- Coordinates: 42°00′45″N 78°03′28″W
- Country: United States
- State: New York
- County: Allegany County
- Incorporated: 1854

Government
  - Mayor: Karen Linza (R) Town Council: David Shields (R); Sandy Jackson (R); James Fleming (R); Anthony Mikalauskas (R)

Area
  - Total: 36.52 sq mi (94.58 km^{2})
  - Land: 36.22 sq mi (93.80 km^{2})
  - Water: 0.30 sq mi (0.78 km^{2})
- Elevation: 2,546 ft (776 m)

Population (2020)
  - Total: 785 ▼
  - Estimate (2021): 779
  - Density: 23.4/sq mi (9.03/km^{2})
- Time zone: UTC-5 (EST)
  - Summer (DST): UTC-4 (EDT)
- ZIP Codes: 14708 (Alma); 14707 (Allentown); 14715 (Bolivar); 14895 (Wellsville)
- Area code: 585
- FIPS code: 36-003-01429
- Website: www.townofalmany.org

Alma is a town in Allegany County, New York, United States. The population was 785 at the 2020 census. The source of the town name is uncertain. One source credits it to Charles Wyvell's interest in the Battle of the Alma, while another attributes it to Stephen O. Alma, first manager of the Newbold Lumber Company of Shongo.

The Town of Alma is on the southern edge of Allegany County and is southwest of the Village of Wellsville.

== History ==
The area was first settled circa 1833. The Town of Alma was established in 1854 from part of the Town of Willing. From 1881 to January 1893, several of the settlements in the Township (most notably Allentown) were on the Wellsville-Eldred Main Line of the Bradford, Eldred & Cuba Railroad (BE&C). The BE&C was a 36" narrow-gauge railroad built to serve the Allegany County oil boom. With the end of the boom and loss of the passenger and freight traffic therefrom, the railroad entered receivership (bankruptcy) and was abandoned. Today, the railheads for Alma Township are Wellsville and Friendship.

Remnants of the railroad bed for the BE&C can be seen in the village of West Clarksville between the village and Dodge Creek behind the Clarksville store. James E. Lewis, a resident in West Clarksville from 1936-1950.

Alma's post office, ZIP code 14708, operated from 1850 until 1996.

== Geography ==
According to the United States Census Bureau, the town has a total area of 36.5 square miles (95 km^{2}), of which 36.5 square miles (95 km^{2}) is land and 0.1 square miles (0.26 km^{2}) (0.25%) is water.

Alma Hill, the wide rise which dominates the southern half of town, is at 2,548 feet (777 m) not only the highest point in Allegany County but the entire western half of the state. The section of Alma Hill Road that runs near the summit is, at approximately 2,500 feet (760 m), the highest free paved public road in the state outside of the Catskills.

The south town line is the Pennsylvania border.

New York State Route 417 (NY 417) crosses the north part of the town.

== Demographics ==
Historical population
Census	Pop.	Note	%±
1860	578		—
1870	766		32.5%
1880	865		12.9%
1890	1,509		74.5%
1900	1,182		−21.7%
1910	973		−17.7%
1920	643		−33.9%
1930	884		37.5%
1940	780		−11.8%
1950	931		19.4%
1960	871		−6.4%
1970	839		−3.7%
1980	920		9.7%
1990	846		−8.0%
2000	847		0.1%
2010	842		−0.6%
2020	785		−6.8%
2021 (est.)	779		−0.8%
U.S. Decennial Census

At the 2000 census, there were 847 people, 322 households and 243 families residing in the town. The population density was 23.2 inhabitants per square mile (9.0/km^{2}). There were 533 housing units at an average density of 14.6 per square mile (5.6/km^{2}). The racial makeup of the town was 97.99% White, 0.12% African American, 0.35% Native American, 0.24% Asian, 0.24% from other races, and 1.06% from two or more races.

There were 322 households, of which 33.5% had children under the age of 18 living with them, 63.0% were married couples living together, 7.8% had a female householder with no husband present, and 24.5% were non-families. 20.5% of all households were made up of individuals, and 7.1% had someone living alone who was 65 years of age or older. The average household size was 2.63 and the average family size was 2.99.

26.6% of the population were under the age of 18, 7.2% from 18 to 24, 28.0% from 25 to 44, 24.0% from 45 to 64, and 14.3% who were 65 years of age or older. The median age was 38 years. For every 100 females, there were 106.6 males. For every 100 females age 18 and over, there were 100.6 males.

The median income for a household in the town was $32,063 and the median family income was $35,833. Males had a median income of $31,023 compared with $17,778 for females. The per capita income for the town was $13,061. About 8.0% of families and 12.0% of the population were below the poverty line, including 16.2% of those under age 18 and 8.8% of those age 65 or over.

== Communities and locations in Alma ==
- Alma – The hamlet of Alma at the junction of County Routes 18 (Petrolia Road) and 38 (4 Mile Road) in the southwest corner of the town.
- Alma Hill – A mountain located northeast of the hamlet of Alma.
- Allentown – A hamlet by NY 417 (Bolivar-Allentown Road) in the northwest corner of the town. The community was once an oil boom town. It was a station on the Eldred-Bolivar-Wellsville Main Line of the Bradford, Eldred & Cuba Railroad 1881-January 1893.
- Honeoye Creek – A stream flowing through the south part of the town past Alma village.
- Knight Creek – A stream in the northern part of the town by NY 417 (Bolivar-Allentown Road).
- Pikeville – A hamlet in the west part of the town on County Route 18 (Petrolia Road).
- Vosburg – A location on the west town line on NY 417 (Bolivar-Allentown Road).

== See also ==
- Drum Raceway
