= Georgia Marsh =

American painter and printmaker

- Born: 1950 (age 74–75); Olean, NY

Georgia Marsh (born 1950) is an American painter and printmaker.

Marsh received a BFA degree from the Rhode Island School of Design in 1972. Her work is included in the collections of the Smithsonian American Art Museum, the Metropolitan Museum of Art and the Morris Museum of Art. Her work has also been published in Bomb.
