= Olean General Hospital =

- Kaleida Health

Geography
- Location: Olean, New York, United States
- Coordinates: 42°05′26″N 78°25′40″W

Organization
- Type: General

Services
- Beds: 186

Links
- Website: www.ogh.org
- Lists: Hospitals in New York State

Olean General Hospital is a 186-bed hospital in Olean, New York. it is part of the Upper Allegheny Health System, a subsidiary of Buffalo, New York-based Kaleida Health.

== Facilities ==
The Olean General Hospital campus consists of the hospital and three additional buildings. The main hospital consists of 186 inpatient beds and comprehensive ancillary and support programs and services. The hospital campus includes the Outpatient Surgery Center, The Dialysis and Primary Care Center building, the Gundlah Dental Center, the Marie Lorenz Dialysis Center, the Center for Wound Healing and Hyperbaric Medicine, and physician offices. The final campus building is the Louis A. Magnano Olean General Hospital Mercy Flight Center which provides space for Mercy Flight of Western New York helicopters and staff.

Off campus facilities include the Mildred Milliman Radiation Medicine Center, a care network site of Roswell Park Comprehensive Cancer Center, in Olean. The Center includes a linear accelerator, CT simulator, and patient examination and treatment space and physician offices. A hospital facility in Franklinville, New York houses a lab collection station and physician offices.

Upper Allegheny Health also operates a primary care center and laboratory collection station in Salamanca, New York and a primary care center and dental center in Delevan, New York.

In 2013, 1,915 Olean General patients were notified that "they may have been exposed to HIV, hepatitis B or hepatitis C through the improper sharing of insulin pens."
