= Olean Speedway =

Defunct auto racing venue in Olean, New York

- Location: Olean, New York
- Coordinates: 42.1051°N 78.4270°W
- Broke ground: 1956
- Opened: 1957
- Closed: 1969
- Surface: Dirt
- Length: .536 km (0.333 mi)

Olean Speedway was a 1/3-mile (0.54 km) dirt oval racing facility located in the Chautauqua-Alleghany (or the western Southern Tier) Region of New York State.

== Overview ==
Olean Speedway was built by Fred Rosen on the northeastern edge of the city of Olean, New York, and opened in 1957. The speedway was one of a series of venues in the Twin Tiers region of New York and Pennsylvania where drivers, such as Hall of Famer and NASCAR Bush competitor Merv Treichler, began their careers before becoming known on the state and national scene.

Charles Ivory took over management in 1964 and the facility continued in operation until 1969. The speedway was demolished to allow for construction of Interstate 86 through that area.
