= Bolivar (village), New York =

Bolivar, New York
- Village
- Motto(s): "The Land of the Deer and the Derrick"
- Location within the state of New York Bolivar (the United States)
- Coordinates: 42°4′2″N 78°10′0″W
- Country: United States
- State: New York
- County: Allegany
- Town: Bolivar

Area
  - Total: 0.80 sq mi (2.06 km^{2})
  - Land: 0.80 sq mi (2.06 km^{2})
  - Water: 0 sq mi (0.00 km^{2})
- Elevation: 1,594 ft (486 m)

Population (2020)
  - Total: 1,010
  - Density: 1,267.7/sq mi (489.45/km^{2})
- Time zone: UTC-5 (Eastern (EST))
  - Summer (DST): UTC-4 (EDT)
- ZIP code: 14715
- Area code: 585
- FIPS code: 36-07190
- GNIS feature ID: 944401
- Website: villageofbolivarny.gov

Bolivar is a village in Allegany County, New York, United States. The village is in the northwest part of the town of Bolivar and is east of Olean. The population of the village was 1,010 at the 2020 census. It is named after Simón Bolívar.

== History ==
The first building on the future site of the village, a log cabin, was erected around 1820. The village of Bolivar was incorporated in 1882.

As "the heart of the Allegany Oil Field", the Bolivar-Richburg area rose to significance during the oil boom era of the late 1800s. During the brief initial oil boom of the 1880s it was purportedly the wealthiest locale, per capita, in the United States. By the early 1900s the initial boom, with its economic and population impacts, had significantly faded, but secondary oil recovery techniques applied to the oil fields (starting around 1920) drastically rejuvenated the industry in the area. By the early 1930s Bolivar village boasted an imposing new school, well-paved streets, a modern sewage treatment facility, and a thriving Main Street economy.

The village and town of Bolivar adopted the description "Land of the Deer and the Derrick" in the mid-1900s.

The village is home to the high school of the Bolivar-Richburg Central School District, which merged in the fall of 1994.

The Bolivar Free Library was listed on the National Register of Historic Places in 2003.

== Geography ==
Bolivar is located at 42°4′2″N 78°9′59″W (42.067324, -78.166622).

According to the United States Census Bureau, the village has a total area of 0.81 square miles (2.1 km^{2}), all land. Root Hollow Creek enters the village from the east, joining with Little Genesee Creek flowing north–south through the west edge of the village, leading to the Allegheny River.

Bolivar is at the junction of state routes 275 and 417.

Bolivar was served (1881–1947) by the Pittsburg, Shawmut & Northern Railroad (PS&N) and predecessors (1881–1893), by the Bradford, Eldred & Cuba Railroad System (BE&C), and (1903–1926) by the Olean, Bradford & Salamanca Railway (OB&S) and predecessors. The early PS&N predecessors and the BE&C were 36" narrow-gauge railroads while the PS&N and OB&S were standard-gauge railroads, the latter being electric-powered.

Notable People:

Frank Gannett, founder of the Gannett News Service, and presidential hopeful, graduated from Bolivar High School in 1893.

Bob Torrey, an NFL running back who played college football for Penn State, and for the Giants, Dolphins and Eagles, graduated from Bolivar High School in 1974.

Richard Dougherty, Bolivar Class of 1938, served as press secretary for Democratic presidential nominee George McGovern during his 1972 campaign. Dougherty went on to serve as the public relations director for the Metropolitan Museum of Art in New York.

Patsy Dougherty, Patrick Henry "Patsy" Dougherty, Bolivar High School Class of 1893, was a professional baseball player from 1902 to 1911. Playing first for the Boston Americans (now Red Sox), in the first modern World Series (1903), Patsy was the first member of the team to hit a World Series home run, the first player ever to hit two home runs in one World Series game, and was the only person to hit a lead-off inside-the-park home run in a World Series game until that feat was finally duplicated 112 years later, in 2015. He was also the first player to play for two different teams when they won the World Series, playing in 1906 for the Chicago White Sox.

== Demographics ==
Historical population
Census	Pop.	Note	%±
1850	100		—
1860	157		57.0%
1900	1,208		—
1910	1,318		9.1%
1920	1,146		−13.1%
1930	1,725		50.5%
1940	1,344		−22.1%
1950	1,490		10.9%
1960	1,405		−5.7%
1970	1,379		−1.9%
1980	1,345		−2.5%
1990	1,261		−6.2%
2000	1,173		−7.0%
2010	1,047		−10.7%
2020	1,010		−3.5%
U.S. Decennial Census

As of the census of 2000, there were 1,173 people, 451 households, and 294 families residing in the village. The population density was 1,560.3 inhabitants per square mile (602.4/km^{2}). There were 500 housing units at an average density of 665.1 units per square mile (256.8 units/km^{2}). The racial makeup of the village was 98.55% White, 0.68% Black or African American, 0.09% Native American, 0.17% Asian, and 0.51% from two or more races. Hispanic or Latino of any race were 0.17% of the population.

There were 451 households, out of which 36.4% had children under the age of 18 living with them, 43.5% were married couples living together, 15.5% had a female householder with no husband present, and 34.8% were non-families. 30.2% of all households were made up of individuals, and 16.0% had someone living alone who was 65 years of age or older. The average household size was 2.60 and the average family size was 3.27.

In the village, the population was spread out, with 31.2% under the age of 18, 10.0% from 18 to 24, 25.9% from 25 to 44, 19.0% from 45 to 64, and 13.9% who were 65 years of age or older. The median age was 34 years. For every 100 females, there were 96.8 males. For every 100 females age 18 and over, there were 92.1 males.

The median income for a household in the village was $29,286, and the median income for a family was $36,442. Males had a median income of $32,019 versus $20,735 for females. The per capita income for the village was $12,804. About 18.2% of families and 20.0% of the population were below the poverty line, including 26.8% of those under age 18 and 3.7% of those age 65 or over.
