= Scio (CDP), New York =

Scio, New York
- Census-designated place
- Location within the state of New York
- Coordinates: 42°10′17″N 77°58′43″W
- Country: United States
- State: New York
- County: Allegany
- Town: Scio

Area
  - Total: 1.32 sq mi (3.43 km^{2})
  - Land: 1.32 sq mi (3.43 km^{2})
  - Water: 0 sq mi (0.00 km^{2})
- Elevation: 1,452 ft (443 m)

Population (2020)
  - Total: 525
  - Density: 396.2/sq mi (152.96/km^{2})
- Time zone: UTC-5 (Eastern (EST))
  - Summer (DST): UTC-4 (EDT)
- ZIP code: 14880
- Area code: 585
- FIPS code: 36-65761
- GNIS feature ID: 0964650

Scio is a census-designated place comprising the primary settlement in the town of Scio, Allegany County, New York, United States. As of the 2010 census it had a population of 609, out of a total population of 1,833 in the town.

== Geography ==
The Scio CDP is located along Route 19 in the Genesee River valley, 4 miles (6 km) north of Wellsville and 8 miles (13 km) south of Interstate 86/New York State Route 17, the Southern Tier Expressway.

According to the United States Census Bureau, the Scio CDP has a total area of 1.4 square miles (3.5 km^{2}), all land.

== Demographics ==
Historical population
Census	Pop.	Note	%±
2020	525		—
U.S. Decennial Census
