= Allegany County, New York =

County in New York, United States

- County
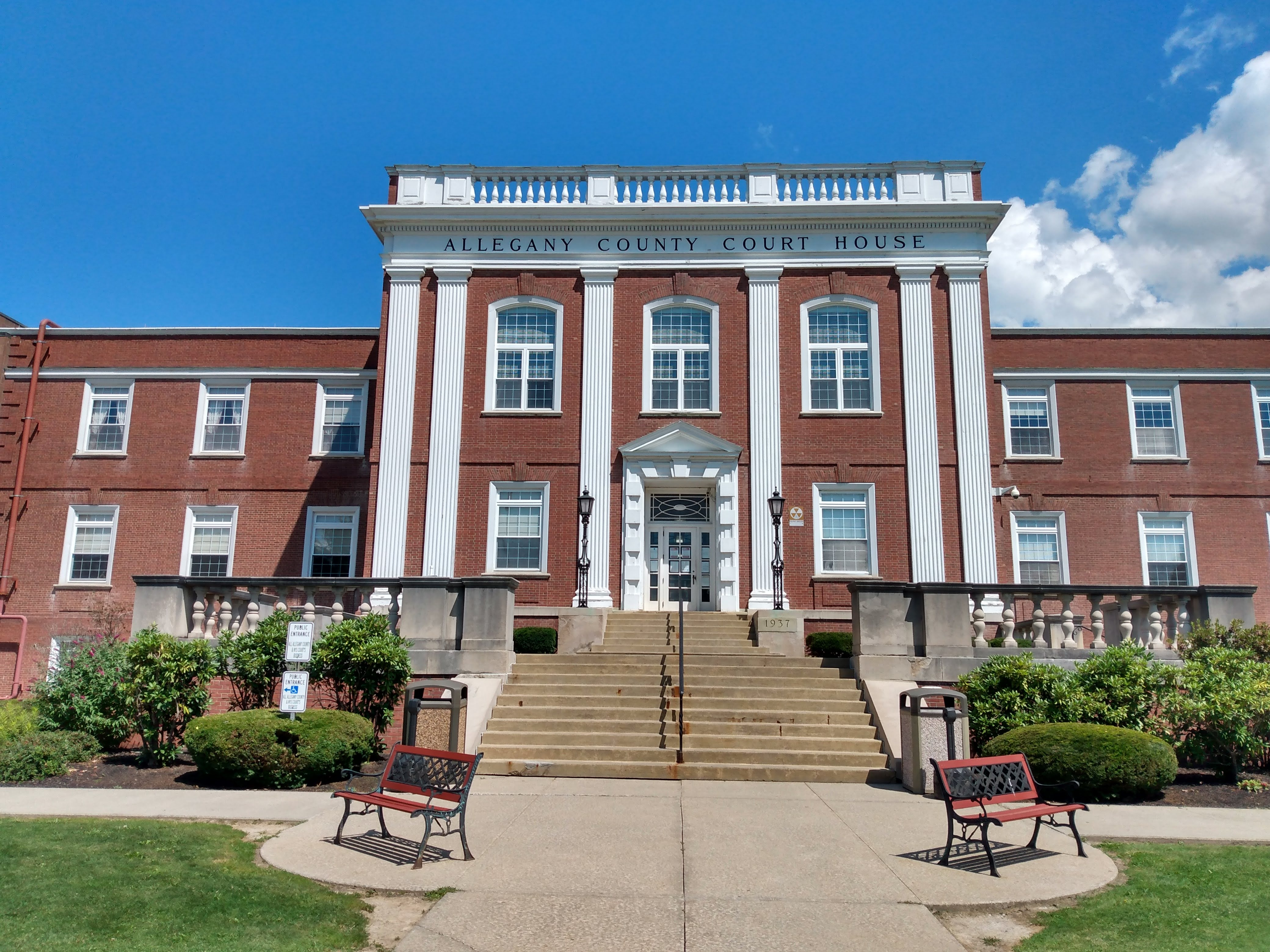
- Allegany County Courthouse

- Flag Seal

- Location within the U.S. state of New York
- Coordinates: 42°13′59″N 78°01′34″W
- Country: United States
- State: New York
- Founded: 1806
- Named for: Lenape name for the Allegheny River
- Seat: Belmont
- Largest town: Wellsville

Government
  - County Chairman: Philip Stockin

Area
  - Total: 1,034 sq mi (2,680 km^{2})
  - Land: 1,029 sq mi (2,670 km^{2})
  - Water: 5.1 sq mi (13 km^{2}) 0.5%

Population (2020)
  - Total: 46,456
  - Estimate (2025): 46,800 ▲
  - Density: 49/sq mi (19/km^{2})
- Time zone: UTC−5 (Eastern)
  - Summer (DST): UTC−4 (EDT)
- Congressional district: 23rd
- Website: www.alleganyco.gov

Allegany County is a county in the U.S. state of New York. As of the 2020 census, the population was 46,456. Its county seat is Belmont. Its name derives from a Lenape word, applied by European-American settlers of Western New York State to a trail that followed the Allegheny River; they also named the county after this. The county is part of the Western New York region of the state.

The county is bisected by the Genesee River, flowing north to its mouth on Lake Ontario. During the mid-nineteenth century, the Genesee Valley Canal was built to link southern markets to the Great Lakes and Mohawk River. The county was also served by railroads, which soon superseded the canals in their capacity for carrying freight. Part of the Oil Springs Reservation, controlled by the Seneca Nation, is located in the county.

== History ==
For centuries, Allegany County was the territory of the Seneca people, at the westernmost nation of the Five Nations of the Haudenosaunee, a confederacy of Iroquoian languages-speaking peoples. European-American permanent settlement did not take place until after the American Revolutionary War and the forced cession by the Seneca of most of their lands in western New York. New York State sold off the lands cheaply to attract new European-American settlers and agricultural development.

Allegany County was created by the state legislature on April 7, 1806, when Genesee County, New York, was partitioned to set aside some 1,570 square miles (4,000 km^{2}) to the new county. The first County Seat was established at Angelica, New York, where it remained for half a century. It was later moved to Belmont, a village located along the Genesee River. On March 11, 1808, the borders were adjusted so that 230 square miles (600 km^{2}) of Steuben County passed to Allegany County, and 600 miles (1,000 km) of Allegany County passed to Genesee County. This established the current border between Genesee and Steuben counties, and reduced the size of Allegany County to 1,200 square miles (3,100 km^{2}).

On June 12, 1812, the legislature authorized the attachment of Cattaraugus County, New York, to Allegany County for administration reasons, but for practical reasons this action did not take place at that time. However, on April 13, 1814, the eastern half of Cattaraugus County was so attached and administered from Belmont. This attachment was ended on March 28, 1817. With continued settlement through the mid-nineteenth century, the legislature periodically adjusted county borders as new counties were organized in western New York. On April 1, 1846, Allegany County lost 120 square miles (310 km^{2}) to Wyoming County, reducing the size of Allegany County to 1,140 square miles (3,000 km^{2}), and establishing the current border between Allegany and Wyoming counties. On May 11, 1846, Allegany County lost 50 square miles (100 km^{2}) to Livingston County, reducing the total to 1,090 square miles (2,800 km^{2}), and establishing the western portion of the current border with Livingston County. On March 23, 1857, Allegany County lost another 40 square miles (100 km^{2}) to Livingston County, passing the Ossian, New York, area to Livingston County, and establishing the current border between them.

== Geography ==
According to the U.S. Census Bureau, the county has a total area of 1,034 square miles (2,680 km^{2}), of which 1,029 square miles (2,670 km^{2}) is land and 5.1 square miles (13 km^{2}) (0.5%) is water.

Allegany County is in the southwestern part of New York State, along the Pennsylvania border. Allegany County does not lie along the Allegheny River, as its name would suggest. The highest point in the county is Alma Hill, with an elevation of 2,548 feet (777 meters) above sea level. This is the highest point in the state west of the Catskill Mountains. The highest point of Interstate 86 is located in the town of West Almond with an elevation of 2,110 feet. This is also believed to be the highest point of any interstate in New York. The county is unique from a watershed perspective as it is providing water to three major watersheds of North America: The eastern part near Alfred has Canacadea Creek that goes into the Canisteo River, Susquehanna River and eventually to Chesapeake Bay.

The Genesee River bisects the county from south to north, flowing north out of the County through Letchworth State Park with its three waterfalls on to Rochester over three more waterfalls to its mouth on Lake Ontario and then on to the St. Lawrence River and Atlantic Ocean. The southwestern part of the County flows into the Allegheny River that flows into the Ohio and then to the Mississippi River basin to the Gulf of Mexico.

In June 1972 the remnants of Hurricane Agnes stalled over the area, dropping more than 20 inches (510 mm) of rain. Flooding took place in the valley communities of Wellsville, Belmont, Belfast, and others in the county.

Long a necessary transportation waterway for the Seneca and other Native Americans, and successive European-American settlers, since the late 20th century, the Genesee River has been extremely popular with canoeists. The river is also favored by fishermen as it abounds in smallmouth bass, trout and panfish.

=== Adjacent counties ===
- Livingston County – northeast
- Steuben County – east
- Potter County, Pennsylvania – southeast
- McKean County, Pennsylvania – southwest
- Cattaraugus County – west
- Wyoming County – northwest

=== Major highways ===
- Interstate 86 (Southern Tier Expressway)
- New York State Route 17 (Southern Tier Expressway)
- New York State Route 19
- New York State Route 21
- New York State Route 305
- New York State Route 417

== Healthcare ==
Allegany County has 2 hospitals. Cuba Memorial Hospital in Cuba, New York and UR Medicine Jones Memorial Hospital in Wellsville, New York. Cuba Memorial is a Critical access hospital and doesn't have an emergency department. The closest hospitals to Allegany County but not in it are Olean General Hospital in Olean, New York, UR Medicine St James Hospital in Hornell, New York, and UR Medicine Noyes Memorial Hospital in Dansville, New York, and Wyoming County Community Health System in Warsaw, New York. WCCHS is a fellow critical access hospital to Cuba Memorial, but WCCHS has an ER. The closest Trauma Centers to Allegany County are Strong Memorial Hospital in Rochester, New York, and Erie County Medical Center in Buffalo, New York.

== Demographics ==
Historical population
Census	Pop.	Note	%±
1810	1,942		—
1820	9,330		380.4%
1830	26,276		181.6%
1840	40,975		55.9%
1850	37,808		−7.7%
1860	41,881		10.8%
1870	40,814		−2.5%
1880	41,810		2.4%
1890	43,240		3.4%
1900	41,501		−4.0%
1910	41,412		−0.2%
1920	36,842		−11.0%
1930	38,025		3.2%
1940	39,681		4.4%
1950	43,395		9.4%
1960	43,978		1.3%
1970	46,782		6.4%
1980	51,742		10.6%
1990	50,470		−2.5%
2000	49,927		−1.1%
2010	48,946		−2.0%
2020	46,456		−5.1%
2025 (est.)	46,800	▲	0.7%
U.S. Decennial Census; 1790-1960 1900-1990; 1990-2000 2010-2020

=== 2020 census ===
Allegany County, New York – Racial and ethnic composition Note: the US Census treats Hispanic/Latino as an ethnic category. This table excludes Latinos from the racial categories and assigns them to a separate category. Hispanics/Latinos may be of any race.
Race / Ethnicity (NH = Non-Hispanic)	Pop 1980	Pop 1990	Pop 2000	Pop 2010	Pop 2020	% 1980	% 1990	% 2000	% 2010	% 2020
White alone (NH)	51,055	49,453	48,222	46,701	42,327	98.67%	97.98%	96.59%	95.41%	91.11%
Black or African American alone (NH)	161	295	349	494	809	0.31%	0.58%	0.70%	1.01%	1.74%
Native American or Alaska Native alone (NH)	122	95	111	97	91	0.24%	0.19%	0.22%	0.20%	0.20%
Asian alone (NH)	120	298	356	451	373	0.23%	0.59%	0.71%	0.92%	0.80%
Native Hawaiian or Pacific Islander alone (NH)	x	x	2	7	6	x	x	0.00%	0.01%	0.01%
Other race alone (NH)	95	16	39	30	218	0.18%	0.03%	0.08%	0.06%	0.47%
Mixed race or Multiracial (NH)	x	x	394	496	1,667	x	x	0.79%	1.01%	3.59%
Hispanic or Latino (any race)	189	313	454	670	965	0.37%	0.62%	0.91%	1.37%	2.08%
Total	51,742	50,470	49,927	48,946	46,456	100.00%	100.00%	100.00%	100.00%	100.00%

=== 2000 census ===
As of the census of 2020, there were 46,456 people. Based on earlier (2000) censuses, there were 18,009 households, and 12,192 families residing in the county. The population density was 48 people per square mile (19 people/km^{2}). There were 24,505 housing units at an average density of 24 per square mile (9.3/km^{2}). The racial makeup of the county was 97.03% White, 0.72% Black or African American, 0.28% Native American, 0.72% Asian, 0.37% from other races, and 0.88% from two or more races. 0.91% of the population were Hispanic or Latino of any race. 22.3% identified as being of German, 16.6% English, 13.8% Irish, 11.9% American and 7.0% Italian ancestry according to Census 2000. 96.5% spoke English and 1.3% Spanish as their first language.

There were 18,009 households, out of which 31.50% had children under the age of 18 living with them, 54.20% were married couples living together, 9.00% had a female householder with no husband present, and 32.30% were non-families. 26.00% of all households were made up of individuals, and 11.30% had someone living alone who was 65 years of age or older. The average household size was 2.53 and the average family size was 3.04.

In the county, the population was spread out, with 24.40% under the age of 18, 15.50% from 18 to 24, 23.90% from 25 to 44, 22.20% from 45 to 64, and 14.00% who were 65 years of age or older. The median age was 35 years. For every 100 females there were 99.80 males. For every 100 females age 18 and over, there were 98.10 males.

The median income for a household in the county was $32,106, and the median income for a family was $38,580. Males had a median income of $30,401 versus $21,466 for females. The per capita income for the county was $14,975. About 10.50% of families and 15.50% of the population were below the poverty line, including 19.20% of those under age 18 and 7.50% of those age 65 or over.

== Government and politics ==
United States presidential election results for Allegany County, New York
Year	Republican		Democratic		Third party(ies)	
Year	No.	%	No.	%	No.	%
1884	6,668	53.47%	3,886	31.16%	1,916	15.36%
1888	7,067	58.37%	3,625	29.94%	1,415	11.69%
1892	5,678	52.14%	3,128	28.73%	2,083	19.13%
1896	7,079	61.51%	3,895	33.85%	534	4.64%
1900	7,200	62.05%	3,621	31.21%	782	6.74%
1904	7,835	68.94%	2,718	23.92%	812	7.14%
1908	7,504	64.64%	3,390	29.20%	715	6.16%
1912	3,668	37.19%	2,777	28.15%	3,419	34.66%
1916	6,308	62.57%	3,191	31.65%	582	5.77%
1920	10,898	74.15%	2,799	19.04%	1,000	6.80%
1924	12,203	75.35%	2,755	17.01%	1,238	7.64%
1928	15,306	78.90%	3,491	18.00%	602	3.10%
1932	12,348	69.46%	4,961	27.91%	468	2.63%
1936	13,829	70.89%	5,288	27.11%	391	2.00%
1940	15,611	75.17%	5,077	24.45%	79	0.38%
1944	13,454	73.60%	4,786	26.18%	39	0.21%
1948	12,689	71.94%	4,711	26.71%	239	1.35%
1952	16,365	80.54%	3,943	19.41%	10	0.05%
1956	16,068	81.41%	3,668	18.59%	0	0.00%
1960	14,408	73.16%	5,280	26.81%	7	0.04%
1964	7,688	42.62%	10,329	57.26%	22	0.12%
1968	11,222	65.45%	4,986	29.08%	937	5.47%
1972	13,426	73.43%	4,812	26.32%	46	0.25%
1976	11,769	65.35%	6,134	34.06%	107	0.59%
1980	10,423	59.09%	5,879	33.33%	1,338	7.59%
1984	14,527	75.25%	4,720	24.45%	57	0.30%
1988	11,880	67.40%	5,614	31.85%	132	0.75%
1992	8,976	47.95%	4,848	25.90%	4,895	26.15%
1996	8,107	45.79%	6,621	37.40%	2,975	16.81%
2000	11,436	61.19%	6,336	33.90%	918	4.91%
2004	12,310	63.88%	6,566	34.07%	394	2.04%
2008	11,013	59.83%	7,016	38.12%	377	2.05%
2012	10,390	61.29%	6,139	36.21%	424	2.50%
2016	12,525	67.01%	4,882	26.12%	1,285	6.87%
2020	14,135	68.02%	6,048	29.10%	599	2.88%
2024	14,425	70.53%	5,802	28.37%	224	1.10%

Allegany County is part of New York's 23rd congressional district and is represented by Republican Nick Langworthy. In the New York State Senate, it is part of the 57th district and is represented by Republican George M. Borrello, and the 58th district is represented by Thomas F. O'Mara. In the New York State Assembly, the county is in the 148th Assembly District represented by Republican Joseph Sempolinski.

Allegany County is divided into five districts, delineated by town borders. The Allegany County Board of Legislators consists of 15 members, three from each of the five legislative districts:

District 1: Angelica, Belfast, Caneadea, Centerville, Granger, Hume, Rushford, and the village of Angelica.

District 2: Amity, Clarksville, Cuba, Friendship, New Hudson, Ward, and the villages of Belmont and Cuba.

District 3: Alma, Bolivar, Genesee, Independence, Scio, Willing, Wirt, and the villages of Bolivar and Richburg.

District 4: Andover, Wellsville, and the villages of Andover and Wellsville.

District 5: Alfred, Allen, Almond, Birdsall, Burns, Grove, West Almond, and the villages of Alfred, Almond, and Canaseraga.

The current chairperson of the legislature is W. Brooke Harris. The County Administrator is Carissa M. Knapp.

Allegany County is considered to be a strongly Republican county. In 2004, it voted for George W. Bush over John Kerry 63% to 34%, and in 2008 it voted for John McCain over Barack Obama 59% to 39%. It has been reported that in the last 170 years, the only Democratic candidates to win were Franklin Pierce in 1852 and Lyndon B. Johnson in 1964. Even in 1964, when Republican nominee Barry Goldwater lost the county by 14 points, he still managed to carry the towns of Centerville, Caneadea, Granger, Hume, and Rushford. In 2006, neither Democrat Eliot Spitzer nor Hillary Clinton carried it in their otherwise landslide elections for governor and US senator, respectively. Eliot Spitzer lost 48.98% to John Faso's 49.03%. Hillary Clinton lost the county by 3 points. In 2010, Andrew Cuomo lost by a wide margin while Senator Chuck Schumer carried it by a narrow margin of 49.46% to Jay Townsend's 48.86% a margin of 78 votes. It was one of only two counties that Senator Kirsten Gillibrand lost to Wendy Long in 2012. In the 2016, 2020, and 2024 presidential elections, Republican Donald Trump received over two-thirds, the first for a Republican since 1988.

Voter registration as of February 20, 2026
Party	Active voters	Inactive voters	Total voters	Percentage
Democratic	5,076	223	5,299	19.44%
Republican	14,010	420	14,430	52.94%
Unaffiliated	6,147	333	6,480	23.78%
Other (Note: Included are voters affiliated with the Conservative Party, Green Party, Working Families Party, Independence Party, Women's Equality Party, Reform Party, and other small parties.)	992	54	1,046	3.84%
Total	26,225	1,030	27,255	100%

== Education ==
=== Primary Education ===
The county has twelve school districts with their buildings in the county and parts of an additional seven districts located outside the county. Districts include: Alfred-Almond Central and Canaseraga Central that are part of the Greater Southern Tier BOCES with a facility in Hornell. Districts in association with the Cattaraugus-Allegany BOCES include: Andover Central School District, Whitesville Central School District, Wellsville Central School District, Bolivar-Richburg Central School District, Scio Central School District, Genesee Valley Central School District, Belfast Central School District, Fillmore Central School District, Friendship Central School District, and Cuba-Rushford Central School District. Districts with their buildings outside the County include Arkport, Hinsdale, Portville, Yorkshire-Pioneer, Letchworth, Canisteo-Greenwood, and Keshequa. There are two private schools: Immaculate Conception in Wellsville and Houghton Academy in Houghton. There are also two Montessori Schools which are located in Wellsville and Alfred

=== Secondary Education ===
- Alfred University
- Houghton University
- The New York State College of Ceramics (a member of SUNY)
- Alfred State College, with a main campus in Alfred, NY and the School of Applied Technology located at the Wellsville campus.

== Communities ==
Allegany County comprises 29 towns and 10 villages.

#	Name	Population	Type	County Legislative District
1	Wellsville	4679	Village	4
2	Alfred	4174	Village	5
3	Houghton	1693	CDP	1
4	Cuba	1575	Village	2
5	Friendship	1218	CDP	2
6	Bolivar	1047	Village	3
7	Andover	1042	Village	4
8	Belmont†	969	Village	2
9	Angelica	869	Village	1
10	Belfast	837	CDP	1
11	Stannards	798	CDP	3
12	Scio	609	CDP	3
13	Fillmore	603	Hamlet/CDP	1
14	Canaseraga	550	Village	5
15	Almond‡	466	Village	5
16	Richburg	450	Village	3
17	Rushford	363	CDP	1

† - County seat

‡ - Not wholly in this county

=== Towns ===
- Alfred
- Allen
- Alma
- Almond
- Amity
- Andover
- Angelica
- Belfast
- Birdsall
- Bolivar
- Burns
- Caneadea
- Centerville
- Clarksville
- Cuba
- Friendship
- Genesee
- Granger
- Grove
- Hume
- Independence
- New Hudson
- Rushford
- Scio
- Ward
- Wellsville
- West Almond
- Willing
- Wirt

=== Villages ===
- Alfred
- Almond
- Andover
- Angelica
- Belmont
- Bolivar
- Canaseraga
- Cuba
- Richburg
- Wellsville

=== Census Designated Places (CDP) ===
- Belfast
- Fillmore
- Friendship
- Houghton
- Rushford
- Scio
- Stannards

=== Hamlets ===
In New York, the term hamlet, while not defined in law, is used to describe an unincorporated community and geographic location within a town. The town in which each hamlet is located is in parentheses.

- Alfred Station (Alfred)
- Tinkertown (Alfred)
- Tip Top (Alfred)
- Allen Center (Allen)
- Aristotle (Allen)
- West Allen (Allen)
- Allentown (Alma)
- Alma (Alma)
- Petrolia (Alma)
- Pikeville (Alma)
- Bishopville (Almond)
- Karrdale (Almond)
- North Almond (Almond)
- Belvidere (Amity)
- Withey (Amity)
- Elm Valley (Andover)
- Rockville (Belfast)
- Hiltonville (Birdsall)
- Scholes (Birdsall)
- Bowler (Bolivar)
- Hoben (Bolivar)
- Kossuth (Bolivar)
- Little Genesee (Bolivar)
- Sawyer (Bolivar)
- South Bolivar (Bolivar)
- Vosburg (Bolivar)
- Garwoods (Burns)
- Gas Spring (Burns)
- Houghton (Caneadea)
- Oramel (Caneadea)
- Centerville (Centerville)
- Fairview (Centerville)
- Higgins (Centerville)
- Germantown (Clarksville)
- Obi (Clarksville)
- West Clarksville (Clarksville)
- North Cuba (Cuba)
- South Cuba (Cuba)
- Hardy Corners (Farmersville)
- Higgins (Friendship)
- Nile (Friendship)
- Ceres (Genesee)
- Sanford (Genesee)
- Short Tract (Granger)
- Swain (Grove)
- Fillmore (Hume)
- Mills Mills (Hume)
- Rossburg (Hume)
- Wiscoy (Hume)
- Fulmer Valley (Independence)
- Spring Mills (Independence)
- Whitesville (Independence)
- Bellville (New Hudson)
- Black Creek (New Hudson)
- Lyons Corners (New Hudson)
- Marshall (New Hudson)
- Rawson (New Hudson)
- Balcom Beach (Rushford)
- Hillcrest (Rushford)
- McGrawville (Rushford)
- Rushford (Rushford)
- Knight Creek (Scio)
- Norton Summit (Scio)
- Scio (Scio)
- Phillips Creek (Ward)
- Stannards (Wellsville)
- Bennetts (West Almond)
- Hallsport (Willing)
- Mapes (Willing)
- Paynesville (Willing)
- Shongo (Willing)
- Inavale (Wirt)
- West Notch (Wirt)

=== Indian reservations ===
- Oil Springs Reservation (part)

The Oil Springs Reservation is an Indian reservation of the Seneca Nation shared with Cattaraugus County having a total area of only one square mile (2.6 km^{2}). This is the site of the famed spring described by the Franciscan Missionary Joseph DeLa Roch D'Allion in 1627, the first recorded mention of oil on the North American Continent. In 1927, the New York State Oil Producers Association sponsored the dedication of a monument at the site describing the history of the oil industry in North America. There is a small park with parking and a footbridge to the monument. The remainder of the reservation is mostly utilized for cottages on Cuba Lake, Seneca-run gas stations, and woodlands.

== See also ==
- List of counties in New York
- National Register of Historic Places listings in Allegany County, New York
- Allegany (town), New York
- Allegany (village), New York
- Alleghany County (disambiguation)
