= Olean, New York =

Olean, New York Seneca: Johíhso'
- City
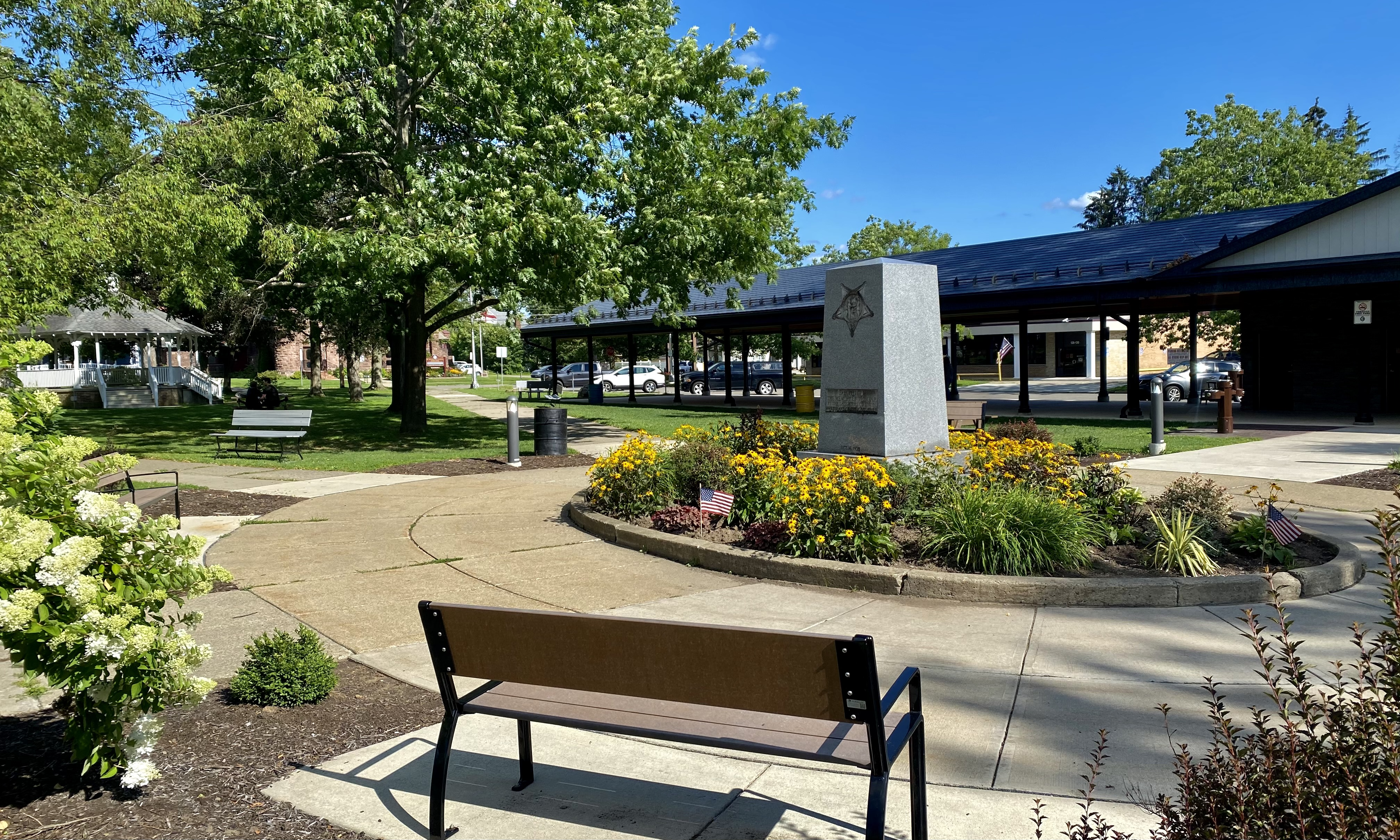
- Lincoln Park in Olean

- Location within New York Location within the United States
- Coordinates: 42°4′57″N 78°25′51″W
- Country: United States
- State: New York
- County: Cattaraugus

Government
  - Type: Mayor-Council
  - Mayor: Amy Sherburne (R)
  - Common Council: Members' List: • W1: Lawrence Bennion (R); • W2: Joseph Keary (R); • W3: Jennifer Forney (R); • W4: Sonya McCall (D); • W5: John Crawford (D); • W6: Vernon Robinson Jr.(I); • W7: David Anastasia (D)

Area
  - Total: 6.17 sq mi (15.97 km^{2})
  - Land: 5.90 sq mi (15.28 km^{2})
  - Water: 0.27 sq mi (0.69 km^{2})

Population (2020)
  - Total: 13,937
  - Density: 2,362.4/sq mi (912.11/km^{2})
- Time zone: UTC−5 (EST)
  - Summer (DST): UTC−4 (EDT)
- Zip Code: 14760
- Area codes: 716, 585
- FIPS code: 36-009-54716
- Website: www.cityofolean.gov

Olean (/ˈoʊliˌæn/ OH-lee-ann, Seneca: Johíhso') is a city in Cattaraugus County, New York, United States. Olean is the largest city in Cattaraugus County and serves as its financial, business, transportation and entertainment center. It is one of the principal cities of the Southern Tier region of Western New York.

As of the 2020 census, Olean had a population of 13,937.

The city is surrounded by the town of Olean and is located in the southeastern part of Cattaraugus County.

== History ==
The first European in the area was possibly Joseph de La Roche Daillon, a missionary and explorer from Canada. La Roche reported on the presence of oil near Cuba, New York; the first petroleum sighting in North America. At that time the area was a part of the territory of the Wenrohronon or Wenro Indians, an Iroquoian-speaking people. In 1643, the Wenro tribes became the first victims of a series of brutal conflicts known as the Second Beaver War.

The area was first settled by Europeans around 1765, called by the Indian name "Ischua". Officially, this was illegal, as the British had declared the land in the Allegheny River watershed to be part of the Indian Reserve after conquering the territory in the French and Indian War two years prior. The surface is a hilly upland, separated into two distinct parts by the valley of the Allegheny. The highest points are 500 to 600 feet (150 to 180 m) above the valley. During the American Revolutionary War, the 1779 Sullivan Expedition established the first road to what would become Olean, blazing a trail to what is now Kittanning, Pennsylvania along the path of what is now New York State Route 16.

Originally the entire territory of the county of Cattaraugus was called the Town of Olean, formed March 11, 1808. As population allowed, the county was split in half and the top half was called "Hebe", and was taken off in 1812, a part of Perrysburgh in 1814, then Great Valley in 1818. Hinsdale formed in 1820, and Portville in 1837, leaving the current boundary of Olean that lies upon the south line of the county, near the southeast corner. The area remained sparsely populated until 1804, when Major Adam Hoops acquired the land and gave it its modern name. Hoops was a surveyor and Revolutionary Warveteran, and was politically connected with Robert Morris, the financier of the Revolution. Along with Morris, Hoops became involved with the Holland Land Company, which was settling western New York.

This was a time of great western expansion into places such as Ohio and Indiana. Since neither canals nor railroads had become widespread by this point, the main means of travel was either by cart or small-boat travel. The Allegheny River was a major transportation route. Hoops believed that a great city could be created at the confluence of the Allegheny and one of its tributaries and went looking for the right spot. In 1804 he found a spot where Olean Creek meets the river; the confluence was important as it was the farthest point downstream in the state before hitting the Seneca Reservation that surrounded most of New York's piece of the river. Hoops received title to 20,000 acres (81 km^{2}) from the Holland Land Company in 1804. Hoops' brother Robert came to the site and built the first permanent structure near today's Forness Park, calling the area Hamilton in honor of Alexander Hamilton.

In a letter to Joseph Ellicott in 1804, Hoops discusses the name Olean from the local Oil Springs and the Latin word oleum:

Canandaigua, N.Y., April 15, 1804 "To Joseph ELLICOTT, Esq., Batavia, New York. Dear Sir,―It was proposed to me at New York to drop the Indian name of Ischue or Ischua (it is also spelt other ways). Confusion might arise from the various spellings, of which to obviate all risk I have concluded so to do as proposed. The neighborhood of the oil spring suggests a name different in sound, though perhaps not different in meaning, which I wish to adopt,―it is "Olean." You will do me a favor by assisting me to establish this name. It may easily be done now by your concurrence. The purpose will be most effectually answered by employing the term, when occasion requires, without saying anything of an intended change of name. To begin, you will greatly oblige me by addressing the first letter you may have occasion to write to me, after I receive the survey, to the Mouth of Olean. The bearer being properly instructed, there will be thereafter no difficulty. Your co-operation in the matter (the effect of which, though not important in itself, may be so on account of precision) will oblige. Your servant, A. HOOPS

The Post Office recognized the new town as "Olean Point". The site was surveyed by 1808, and a map from that year shows a basic street pattern that still survives, along with most of the modern street names. In 1823, the city is called Olean, without the "Point", on county maps.

In 1854 Olean was formally incorporated by the New York State Legislature, and the trustees elected at the first subsequent town meeting were Lambert Thithney, C.B.B. Barse, Charles Thing, and John K. Comstock. Enos C. Brooks was appointed clerk of Olean.

=== Timber and railroads ===
Adam Hoops's dream of creating a major transportation hub on the Allegheny River, on the scale of a Buffalo or a Pittsburgh, was never realized and he himself died in poverty. Nonetheless, Olean prospered and was soon the central town of the region. Olean grew quickly as a transportation hub for migrants taking the Allegheny River into Ohio. For much of this era Olean was larger and better known than its northern competitor Buffalo. This period ended with the creation of the great canals, especially the Erie Canal in 1825. The Allegheny River was usually too shallow for the larger steamboats to navigate, except in the spring, and only two steamboats—the Allegheny in 1830 and the New Castle of 1837—reached the city. A Genesee Valley Canal was extended to Olean and the Allegheny River in 1862, but the Allegheny's shallowness and the rise of the railroads rendered it obsolete before it even opened.

Timber was a major industry in New York and Pennsylvania between 1830 and 1850, and Olean was the chief timber town in the region during those times. After river travel declined Olean became the regional railroad hub. The town was the crossroads of several railroads, a situation which endures into today with the Western New York and Pennsylvania Railroad.

Olean was the home of several corporations. During the late-19th century, Olean had a few mills, a bicycle company, a manufacturer of mechanical pumps and a glass works, among other factories. St. Bonaventure University was founded just outside town in 1858. Olean was incorporated as a village in 1854, and as a city in 1893. Olean was a rival of the comparably-populated, but much newer, city of Salamanca, New York at the turn of the 20th century, but the decline of the timber industry in southwestern Cattaraugus County and complications with Salamanca being situated on borrowed Seneca Nation land allowed Olean to continue growing while Salamanca declined.

=== Oil and rum-running ===
Oil was first discovered in the region by a French explorer in 1632, but it was rediscovered for commercial use during the Pennsylvania oil rush. Oil became the city's claim to fame for fifty years.

Olean was the railroad and pipeline hub for the surrounding oil region. The operations HQ of Standard Oil's New York affiliate, Socony, was based in the city. Oil produced on both sides of the state line (e.g. in Bradford, Pennsylvania) would be transported to Olean for rail travel. For a short time, Olean was the world's largest oil depot, complete with a "tank city" on the edge of town. A pipeline was also built linking the city to Standard Oil refineries in Bayonne, New Jersey. The oil industry maintained a presence in the city until 1954, the same year in which Olean's population peaked.

Oil also produced Olean's highest-ranking politician. Oil executive Frank W. Higgins was governor of New York in 1905–1907. Higgins' family owned grocery stores in the area, and Higgins also ran this business before his political career. To this day, Olean is one of the few smaller cities in New York State to be home to a governor.

Olean garnered notoriety as a major stop on bootlegging routes during Prohibition through the 1920s until 1933. Dempsey, the Chief of Police, did not condone these thugs or their illegal activities. He did not aggressively pursue arrests, however, unless he had evidence that the violator was responsible for a crime committed in his jurisdiction. As long as you kept your nose clean in the Olean City limits, it was a "safe haven". Local stories relating to this period are numerous. Some are documented and some are legends. Olean, located on a back-road route between Chicago and New York City, was often frequented by famous mobsters of the era. Al Capone of Chicago, probably the most famous gang leader of the time, visited Olean in pursuance of his illegal endeavors. Olean was nicknamed "Little Chicago" in the press, due to its connection with mobsters and bootleggers, and Capone was a frequent visitor.

=== Today ===
In September 1968, Olean was the first city in the United States to install video cameras along its main business street in an effort to fight crime.

Olean is the largest city in Cattaraugus County. The city's population peaked at an estimated 25,000 during the mid-1950s. The current population of the city is around 15,000.

== Geography ==
Olean is located in southeastern Cattaraugus County at 42°4′57″N 78°25′51″W (42.08264, -78.430965).

According to the United States Census Bureau, the city has a total area of 6.2 square miles (16.0 km^{2}), of which 5.9 square miles (15.3 km^{2}) is land and 0.27 square miles (0.7 km^{2}), or 4.19%, is water.

The city is located where Olean Creek flows into the Allegheny River and by the Southern Tier Expressway (Interstate 86 and New York State Route 17). New York State Route 417 passes east–west through the city and intersects New York State Route 16, a north–south highway.

=== Climate ===
As a result of its higher elevation, Olean has a cooler humid continental climate (Köppen Dfb) than the larger western New York cities with hot-summer humid continental climates (Dfa).

Climate data for Olean, New York, 1991–2020 normals, extremes 1927–present
Month	Jan	Feb	Mar	Apr	May	Jun	Jul	Aug	Sep	Oct	Nov	Dec	Year
Record high °F (°C)	66 (19)	73 (23)	80 (27)	87 (31)	92 (33)	92 (33)	99 (37)	93 (34)	94 (34)	86 (30)	78 (26)	70 (21)	99 (37)
Mean maximum °F (°C)	56.9 (13.8)	55.7 (13.2)	66.3 (19.1)	79.3 (26.3)	86.5 (30.3)	88.4 (31.3)	89.3 (31.8)	87.6 (30.9)	86.6 (30.3)	78.9 (26.1)	69.0 (20.6)	57.1 (13.9)	90.9 (32.7)
Mean daily maximum °F (°C)	31.7 (−0.2)	34.4 (1.3)	43.1 (6.2)	56.5 (13.6)	68.3 (20.2)	76.0 (24.4)	80.3 (26.8)	78.7 (25.9)	72.6 (22.6)	59.8 (15.4)	47.3 (8.5)	37.1 (2.8)	57.2 (14.0)
Daily mean °F (°C)	22.4 (−5.3)	24.6 (−4.1)	32.1 (0.1)	44.5 (6.9)	56.0 (13.3)	64.2 (17.9)	68.6 (20.3)	67.0 (19.4)	60.8 (16.0)	49.1 (9.5)	37.9 (3.3)	28.9 (−1.7)	46.3 (8.0)
Mean daily minimum °F (°C)	13.1 (−10.5)	14.8 (−9.6)	21.1 (−6.1)	32.4 (0.2)	43.7 (6.5)	52.5 (11.4)	57.0 (13.9)	55.3 (12.9)	49.0 (9.4)	38.4 (3.6)	28.5 (−1.9)	20.7 (−6.3)	35.5 (2.0)
Mean minimum °F (°C)	−7.6 (−22.0)	−4.1 (−20.1)	3.4 (−15.9)	20.4 (−6.4)	30.1 (−1.1)	39.8 (4.3)	47.9 (8.8)	47.0 (8.3)	38.5 (3.6)	26.8 (−2.9)	14.8 (−9.6)	4.7 (−15.2)	−11.0 (−23.9)
Record low °F (°C)	−22 (−30)	−21 (−29)	−16 (−27)	15 (−9)	23 (−5)	30 (−1)	42 (6)	43 (6)	30 (−1)	17 (−8)	−2 (−19)	−12 (−24)	−22 (−30)
Average precipitation inches (mm)	2.73 (69)	1.97 (50)	2.63 (67)	3.35 (85)	3.66 (93)	4.48 (114)	4.28 (109)	4.03 (102)	3.85 (98)	3.60 (91)	2.87 (73)	3.22 (82)	40.67 (1,033)
Average snowfall inches (cm)	17.6 (45)	13.7 (35)	10.1 (26)	1.8 (4.6)	0.0 (0.0)	0.0 (0.0)	0.0 (0.0)	0.0 (0.0)	0.0 (0.0)	0.3 (0.76)	6.3 (16)	14.9 (38)	64.7 (165.36)
Average extreme snow depth inches (cm)	7.7 (20)	6.9 (18)	7.0 (18)	1.3 (3.3)	0.0 (0.0)	0.0 (0.0)	0.0 (0.0)	0.0 (0.0)	0.0 (0.0)	0.2 (0.51)	3.6 (9.1)	6.2 (16)	10.5 (27)
Average precipitation days (≥ 0.01 in)	18.9	15.2	14.9	14.7	14.7	14.3	12.9	12.8	12.4	15.4	14.4	18.1	178.7
Average snowy days (≥ 0.1 in)	12.5	10.3	6.0	1.8	0.0	0.0	0.0	0.0	0.0	0.2	3.7	9.2	43.7
Source 1: NOAA
Source 2: National Weather Service

== Demographics ==
Historical population
Census	Pop.	Note	%±
1870	1,327		—
1880	3,036		128.8%
1890	7,358		142.4%
1900	9,462		28.6%
1910	14,743		55.8%
1920	20,506		39.1%
1930	21,790		6.3%
1940	21,506		−1.3%
1950	22,884		6.4%
1960	21,868		−4.4%
1970	19,169		−12.3%
1980	18,207		−5.0%
1990	16,946		−6.9%
2000	15,347		−9.4%
2010	14,452		−5.8%
2020	13,937		−3.6%
U.S. Decennial Census

=== 2020 census ===
As of the 2020 census, Olean had a population of 13,937. The median age was 39.8 years. 22.0% of residents were under the age of 18 and 19.0% of residents were 65 years of age or older. For every 100 females there were 96.9 males, and for every 100 females age 18 and over there were 92.3 males age 18 and over.

99.8% of residents lived in urban areas, while 0.2% lived in rural areas.

There were 6,246 households in Olean, of which 25.6% had children under the age of 18 living in them. Of all households, 32.7% were married-couple households, 23.7% were households with a male householder and no spouse or partner present, and 33.3% were households with a female householder and no spouse or partner present. About 39.9% of all households were made up of individuals and 15.6% had someone living alone who was 65 years of age or older.

There were 6,997 housing units, of which 10.7% were vacant. The homeowner vacancy rate was 1.6% and the rental vacancy rate was 8.8%.

Racial composition as of the 2020 census
Race	Number	Percent
White	11,880	85.2%
Black or African American	519	3.7%
American Indian and Alaska Native	83	0.6%
Asian	257	1.8%
Native Hawaiian and Other Pacific Islander	1	0.0%
Some other race	136	1.0%
Two or more races	1,061	7.6%
Hispanic or Latino (of any race)	376	2.7%

=== 2000 census ===
As of the census of 2000, there were 15,347 people, 6,446 households, and 3,803 families residing in the city. The population density was 2,588.0 inhabitants per square mile (999.2/km^{2}). There were 7,121 housing units at an average density of 1,200.8 per square mile (463.6/km^{2}). The racial makeup of the city was 93.31% White, 3.47% Black or African American, 0.43% Native American, 0.89% Asian, 0.03% Pacific Islander, 0.43% from other races, and 1.45% from two or more races. Hispanic or Latino of any race were 1.24% of the population.

There were 6,446 households, out of which 29.1% had children under the age of 18 living with them, 42.0% were married couples living together, 13.2% had a female householder with no husband present, and 41.0% were non-families. 35.3% of all households were made up of individuals, and 14.1% had someone living alone who was 65 years of age or older. The average household size was 2.29 and the average family size was 2.97.

In the city, the population was spread out, with 24.6% under the age of 18, 8.0% from 18 to 24, 27.2% from 25 to 44, 22.3% from 45 to 64, and 17.9% who were 65 years of age or older. The median age was 38 years. For every 100 females, there were 88.1 males. For every 100 females age 18 and over, there were 84.3 males.

The median income for a household in the city was $30,400, and the median income for a family was $38,355. Males had a median income of $32,341 versus $22,469 for females. The per capita income for the city was $17,169. About 13.9% of families and 15.9% of the population were below the poverty line, including 20.5% of those under age 18 and 10.2% of those age 65 or over.

== Economy ==
- Cutco is headquartered in Olean and manufactures all of its knives in the city.
- Dresser-Rand's North American headquarters was in Olean.
- Hysol Corporation, later bought by Dexter Corporation and then Henkel was one of Olean's largest employers. Henkel sold the company to SolEpoxy in 2010.
- Colonial Radio Group was headquartered in Olean from 2009 to 2018. It has since exited the region and moved to the Carolinas.
- Olean General Hospital, is part of Upper Allegheny Health System (UAHS), which includes Bradford Regional Medical Center (BRMC) in Bradford, Pennsylvania. UAHS provides care to a service area with more than 160,000 individuals in Southwestern New York and Northwestern Pennsylvania.
- Olean Wholesale Grocery, a regional grocery wholesaler, was located just east of the city. It was bought out by C&S Wholesale Grocers with intent to close the facility in 2019.

== Education ==
The Olean City School District has two elementary schools, East View Elementary and Washington West Elementary; a middle school, Olean Intermediate Middle School; and Olean High School is the city's public high school. It was the site of the 1974 Olean High School shooting.

Archbishop Walsh Academy is Olean's Roman Catholic school for grades K-12.

A branch of Jamestown Community College is within the city. St. Bonaventure University is a few miles to the west in the town of Allegany.

== Sports ==
- Between 1908 and 1916, Olean hosted minor league baseball. The Olean Refiners played as a member of the Class D level Interstate League.
- Between 1939 and 1966, the Olean Oilers played at Brander Stadium as part of the New York–Penn League
- In 2012 the Olean Oilers were recreated. The Oilers currently play in the New York Collegiate Baseball League (NYCBL), a summer collegiate baseball league. They won the League Championship in 2015 and 2016.
- Bradner Stadium, originally built in the 1926, is a multi-purpose stadium, which can accommodate both baseball and football, and served as home to minor-league baseball teams including the Olean Oilers (aka Olean Yankees). The Stadium also hosts the Olean High School Huskies football team.
- Olean is also the home of the Southern Tier Diesel adult amateur football team.
- Adult recreational and pickup soccer is available.

== Historic sites ==
The following are listed on the National Register of Historic Places: Beardsley-Oliver House, Conklin Mountain House, Oak Hill Park Historic District, Olean Armory, Olean Public Library, Olean School No. 10, St. Stephen's Episcopal Church Complex, Temple B'Nai Israel, Union and State Streets Historic District, and the United States Post Office.

The Church of St Mary of the Angels on Henley Street was built in 1915 and was designated by Pope Francis as a basilica in 2017. Religious author Thomas Merton often went to the Church to pray and attend confession during his transition into prayer and spirituality and renouncement of an unchaste lifestyle. At the close of 1940, he stopped into St. Mary of the Angels one last time to pray the stations of the cross before boarding the train taking him to the Abbey of Our Lady of Gethsemani.

== Transportation ==
Interstate 86 spans east–west and is to the northern edge of Olean. New York Route 16 heads north from Olean to Buffalo. New York Route 417 heads east from Olean. Until 1968, the Pennsylvania Railroad operated the Buffalo Day Express heading north from Washington, D.C., through Olean to Buffalo (the Baltimore Day Express operated on the southbound version of the route). The Penn Central railroad operated an unnamed successor train through Olean from Harrisburg, Pennsylvania to Buffalo between 1968 and May 1, 1971, when passenger train service in the region ended with the inception of Amtrak.

Since 2001, the former Erie Lackawanna Railway mainline between Hornell, NY and Meadville, PA has been operated by the Western New York and Pennsylvania Railroad, a shortline railroad that has also operated portions of the former Pennsylvania Railroad Buffalo Line, both north and south of its Olean headquarters, since 2007.

Until January 6, 1970, the Erie Lackawanna Railroad operated through Olean with the Chicago - Hoboken, New Jersey " Lake Cities": the last passenger train to traverse the entire Southern Tier. The Erie and the PRR train stations were about one mile (1.6 km) apart.

The nearest general commercial airports with scheduled flights for the public are in Erie, Buffalo and the Elmira area.

== Notable people ==
=== Sports ===
- Claude Allen, Olympic athlete
- George Capwell, businessman who founded Empresa Eléctrica del Ecuador and Ecuadorian soccer club C.S. Emelec and soccer coach
- Eddie Donovan, New York Knicks head coach (1961–1965), head coach, St. Bonaventure University, 1954–1961
- Bryan Hodgson, basketball coach
- Bob Lanier, Basketball Hall of Fame player, St. Bonaventure University player (1967–1970), Detroit Pistons player (1970–1980), Milwaukee Bucks (1980–1984)
- John McGraw, Baseball Hall of Fame player and manager
- Darwin Peters Jr., racing driver
- John Wojcik, former MLB player
- Louis Zamperini, World War II prisoner of war survivor, inspirational speaker, and former American competitor in the Olympics.

=== Arts ===
- Beverly Bower, opera singer
- Pandora Boxx, drag queen
- Bill Easley, saxophonist
- JG Faherty, horror, thriller, and science fiction author
- Jeff Fahey, actor
- Donald Innis, architect who invented the floating airport
- Bobby Johnston, film composer, musician
- Robert Lax, poet
- Grace Marra, musician
- Georgia Marsh, painter
- Meg Saligman, muralist
- Jon Serl, folk artist
- Tom Stephan (aka Superchumbo), remix artist
- Peter Tomarken, host of the game show Press Your Luck, was born and grew up in Olean
- Clifford Ulp, art professor

=== Politics ===
- Augustus Barrows, Wisconsin lumberman and legislator
- Chauncey J. Fox, New York State senator
- Edward M. Gabriel, United States ambassador to Morocco
- James F. Hastings, Republican U.S. congressman, 1969–1976
- Frank W. Higgins, 35th governor of New York from 1905 to 1906
- Sarah E. Kellogg, politician, postmaster, and real estate agent; served in California's 51st State Assembly district
- Frederick S. Martin, early Republican congressman
- Timothy H. Porter, 19th-century U.S. Congressman
- Heather Tully, nurse and member of the West Virginia House of Delegates
- James C. Willson, 12th mayor of Flint, Michigan
- Catharine Young, New York state senator

=== Other ===
- George G. Lundberg, pilot
- Joe Mayer, founder of the town of Mayer, Arizona
- Hamilton Hobart Stow, oil well operator
- Hiram Northup, banker
- Larry Trask, linguist

== See also ==
- Radio stations in the Olean market
- National Register of Historic Places listings in Cattaraugus County, New York
- Olean Speedway
