= Philip Church =

American judge and landowner (1778–1861)

Philip Schuyler Church
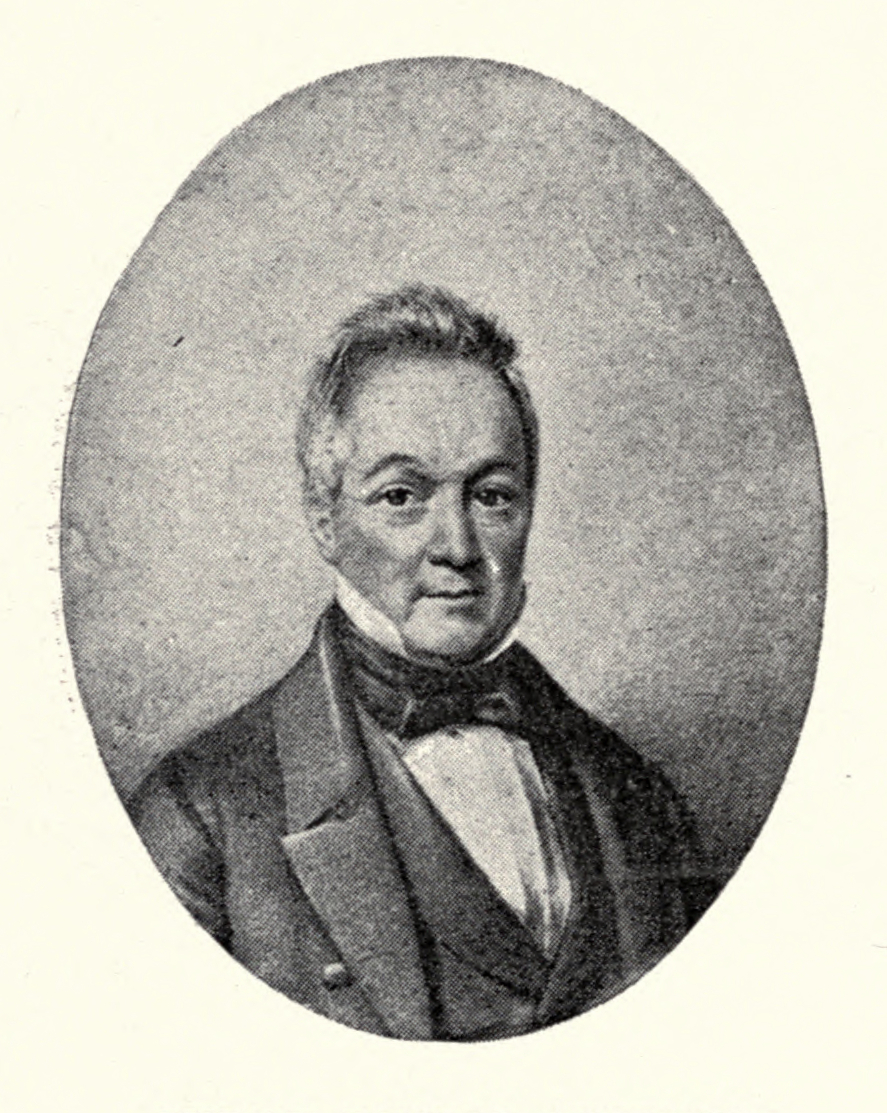
- Born: April 14, 1778; Boston, Massachusetts, US
- Died: January 7, 1861 (aged 82); Angelica, New York, US
- Resting place: Until the Day Dawn Cemetery, Angelica, New York
- Spouse: Anna Matilda Stewart (m. 1805)
- Children: 9
- Parent(s): John Barker Church; Angelica Schuyler Church
- Family: Schuyler

Philip Schuyler Church (April 14, 1778 – January 1, 1861) was an American judge, landowner, and founder of the town of Angelica, New York. From 1798 to 1800, during the Quasi-War with France, he was a captain in the U.S. Army and aide-de-camp to Alexander Hamilton, his uncle, who was then Major General of the Army.

== Early life and education ==
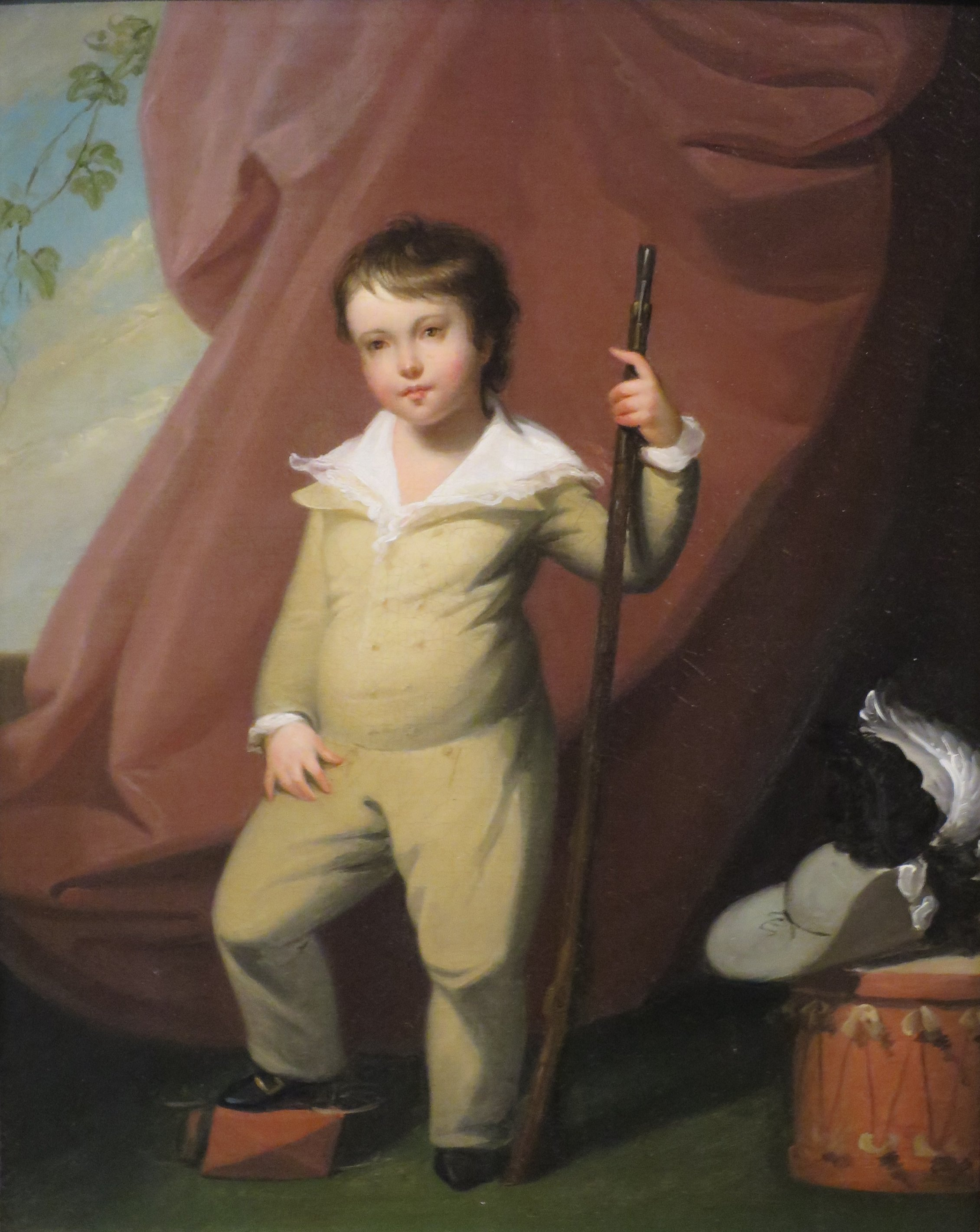
Church as a child by John Trumbull, 1784

Church was born in Boston, Massachusetts, on April 14, 1778. He was the oldest child of Angelica Schuyler Church and John Barker Church, a British-born merchant and member of Parliament.

As a small child, he moved with his family from New York to Paris, where he and his mother were painted together by John Trumbull. After 18 months, the Church family moved to London, and Philip was educated for six years at Eton College. He began the study of law at the Middle Temple before returning to New York in 1797.

In New York, he continued his law studies, working in the offices of Nathaniel Pendleton. He also served as a U.S. Army captain and was appointed aide-de-camp to Alexander Hamilton from 1798 to 1800, while Hamilton was Major General and Inspector General of the Army during the Quasi-War with France. His mother, Angelica, was the sister of Hamilton's wife Elizabeth Schuyler Hamilton.

Prior to his admission to practice law in New York, Church served as second to his cousin Philip Hamilton in his fatal 1801 duel with George Eacker.

== Settlement of Allegany County ==
In May 1800, at the age of 22, Church became a major landowner in western New York, with a tract of 100,000 acres (40,000 ha) of land in present-day Allegany County and Genesee County, New York that had been a portion of the Phelps and Gorham Purchase.

Church's father John Barker Church had loaned money to financier Robert Morris, and accepted a mortgage on the tract in May 1796 as security for the debt owed to him by Morris. After Morris failed to pay the mortgage, John Barker Church foreclosed and sent Philip to Canandaigua in May 1800 to attend the foreclosure sale, where Philip made a successful bid and acquired the tract.

Philip Church traveled in 1801 to the area with his surveyor Moses Van Campen and four others to take possession of the land. Church selected specific acreage for a planned village along the Genesee River, with plots and design to be reminiscent of Paris. The plan included a circular road enclosing a village park at the center of town, streets radiating from the circular road to form a star, and five churches situated around the circle. Philip named the village Angelica, after his mother, and began to open it up for sale to settlers. By 1803, the village was populated with log cabin homes, including Church's, and he had erected a sawmill and a gristmill.

On February 4, 1805, Church married Anna Matilda Stewart (1786–1865), the daughter of General Walter Stewart. Soon after their wedding in Philadelphia, the two settled in the village of Angelica, where a small whitewashed house (locally known as the "White House") had already been built for the couple on the banks of the Genesee River.

In 1806, Angelica and John Barker Church began construction on a thirty-room mansion nearby, called Belvidere, which still stands as a privately owned home on the banks of the Genesee in Belmont, New York, near the town of Angelica. Although they had intended to make it their summer home, it instead became the residence of Philip and Anna Church when it was partially completed in 1810.

== Career and later life ==
Church was still under 30 when he was appointed the first Judge of the New York County Court for Allegany County, in 1807.

He died in Angelica on January 7, 1861, at the age of 82.

The New York Times cited the Erie Railway as Church's "great work to which for a number of years he devoted his time and applied his energies... which he lived to see completed and the process of transformation which followed fairly begun." The Times also credited Church with being the first to suggest the idea of the Genesee Valley Canal, and influential in its completion.

== Children ==
Philip and Anna Church had nine children. These included:

- Elizabeth, who married Robert Horwood (or Harwood), and resided in England
- Major Richard Church, who held a position c. 1895 as a political appointee in the New York Custom House
- Angelica (d. 1895), who married John Warren and resided in New York City
