= Angelica, New York =

- Town
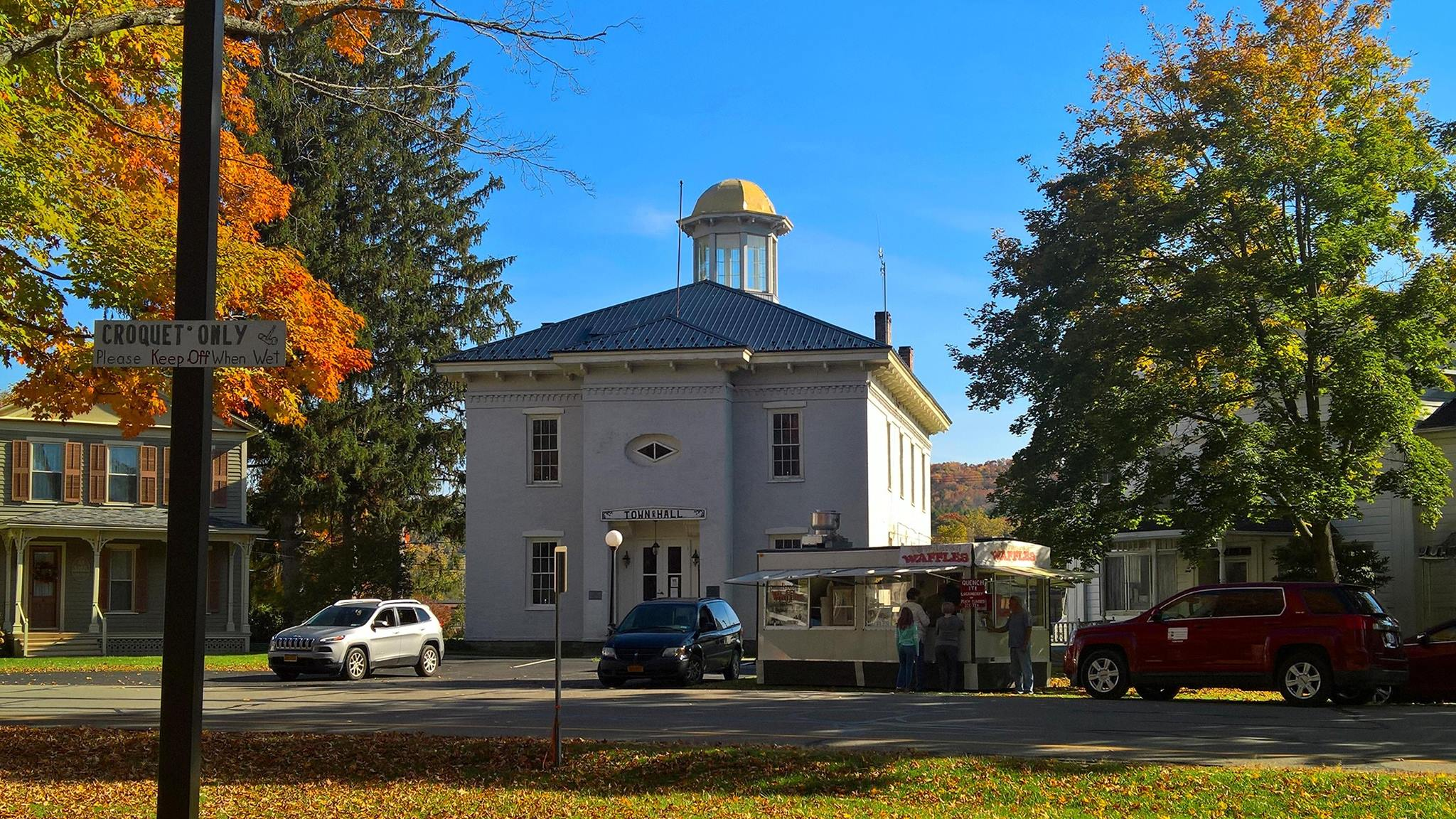
- Town hall

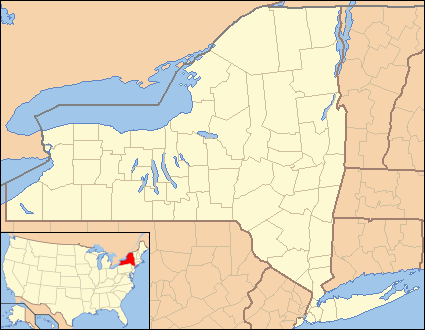
- Location in New York
- Coordinates: 42°18′23″N 78°00′59″W
- Country: United States
- State: New York
- County: Allegany

Government
  - Type: Town Council
  - Town Supervisor: Robert Jones (R)
  - Town Council: Members' List: • Alvin McCarty (R); • Donald C. Case (R); • Elwyn Gordon (R); • Paul Gaullmann (R)

Area
  - Total: 36.43 sq mi (94.36 km^{2})
  - Land: 36.39 sq mi (94.26 km^{2})
  - Water: 0.039 sq mi (0.10 km^{2})

Population (2020)
  - Total: 1,284 ▼
  - Estimate (2021): 1,278
  - Density: 37.3/sq mi (14.41/km^{2})
- Time zone: Eastern (EST)
- ZIP Codes: 14709 (Angelica); 14813 (Belmont); 14711 (Belfast); 14804 (Almond)
- FIPS code: 36-003-02187
- Website: angelicany.org

Angelica is a town in the middle of Allegany County, New York, United States. The population was 1,284 at the 2020 census. The town is named after Angelica Schuyler Church, the sister of Elizabeth Schuyler Hamilton, activist, scholar, sister and mother, daughter of General Philip Schuyler, sister-in-law of Founding Father Alexander Hamilton and wife of John Barker Church. The town was named by Philip Schuyler Church, who was one of the original European settlers of the area, and the son of Angelica and John Barker Church. The village of Angelica is located within this town.

== History ==
Prior to European settlement, the Seneca name for the area was Ga-ne-o'-weh-ga-yat or "head of the stream". The area was first settled around 1802 at Angelica village. The town of Angelica was formed in 1805 from the town of Leicester in Livingston County, before Allegany County was formed. Angelica is the oldest town in Allegany County. The town hall is housed in the Old Allegany County Courthouse, listed on the National Register of Historic Places in 1972. Belvidere was also listed in 1972, and the Moses Van Campen House was listed in 2004.

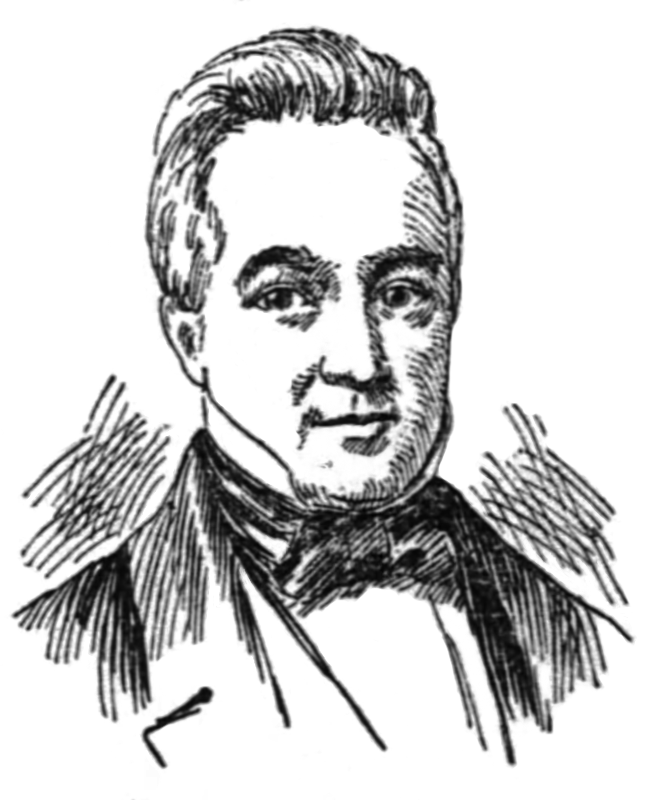
Wood engraving of a portrait of Philip Schuyler Church

Angelica Schuyler Church was an American socialite. In 1777, Angelica eloped with John Barker Church. In May 1796, Church accepted a mortgage on 100,000 acres (40,000 ha) of land, a portion of the Phelps and Gorham Purchase in present-day Allegany County and Genesee County, New York, against a debt owed to him by his friend Robert Morris. After Morris failed to pay the mortgage, Church foreclosed, and his son Philip Schuyler Church acquired the land in May 1800. Philip traveled to take possession of the land, with his surveyor Moses Van Campen. A planned village was laid out with the plots and design to be reminiscent of Paris, France (a circular drive in the center, streets coming to that drive to form a star, and five churches situated around the circle). In the center of the circular drive is the village park. Philip named his planned village Angelica, after his mother.

The historian John S. Minard wrote of the town's establishment in Allegany County and Its People (1896):

"The town was formed by an act of the Legislature, passed Feb. 25, 1805, and described as "being in width twelve miles," just that of the Morris Reserve, and in length "from south to north extending thirty-four miles from the Pennsylvania line," taking in about two-thirds of the towns of Granger and Grove. It was taken from Leicester, and when erected was a part of Genesee county. (The village had been founded three or four years before, and named by Capt. Philip Church for his mother, Angelica, the eldest daughter of Gen. Philip Schuyler.^{[2]"}

Philip left to marry Anna Matilda Stewart, daughter of General Walter Stewart in Philadelphia. For their honeymoon, they traveled first by boat, then by raft as far west as Bath, New York, then on horseback to the banks of the Genesee River. They constructed a small house, soon to be whitewashed and known as the "white house". In 1804, they had their mansion built (known as "Belvidere"). It still stands on the banks of the Genesee near Angelica, New York.

== Geography ==
According to the United States Census Bureau, the town has a total area of 36.4 square miles (94.4 km^{2}), of which 36.4 square miles (94.3 km^{2}) is land and 0.039 square miles (0.1 km^{2}), or 0.10%, is water.

The Southern Tier Expressway (Interstate 86 and New York State Route 17) – passes through the town. Angelica is accessible from the highway at Exit 31, mile 109

- The Genesee River – flows northward through the southwest part of the town.
- Angelica Creek – A tributary of the Genesee River flows through the town and village.
- Bald Mountain – A prominent hill northeast of Angelica village.

Historical population
Census	Pop.	Note	%±
1820	1,510		—
1830	998		−33.9%
1840	1,251		25.4%
1850	1,592		27.3%
1860	1,708		7.3%
1870	1,643		−3.8%
1880	1,620		−1.4%
1890	1,749		8.0%
1900	1,639		−6.3%
1910	1,668		1.8%
1920	1,502		−10.0%
1930	1,338		−10.9%
1940	1,410		5.4%
1950	1,390		−1.4%
1960	1,335		−4.0%
1970	1,306		−2.2%
1980	1,438		10.1%
1990	1,446		0.6%
2000	1,411		−2.4%
2010	1,403		−0.6%
2020	1,284		−8.5%
2021 (est.)	1,278		−0.5%
U.S. Decennial Census

== Demographics ==
As of the census of 2000, there were 1,411 people, 564 households, and 382 families residing in the town. The population density was 38.7 inhabitants per square mile (14.9/km^{2}). There were 774 housing units at an average density of 21.2 per square mile (8.2/km^{2}). The racial makeup of the town was 97.87% White, 0.28% Black or African American, 0.50% Native American, 0.07% Asian, and 1.28% from two or more races. Hispanic or Latino of any race were 0.35% of the population.

There were 564 households, out of which 32.8% had children under the age of 18 living with them, 54.4% were married couples living together, 10.1% had a female householder with no husband present, and 32.1% were non-families. 27.1% of all households were made up of individuals, and 11.7% had someone living alone who was 65 years of age or older. The average household size was 2.50 and the average family size was 3.03.

In the town, the population was spread out, with 27.4% under the age of 18, 7.0% from 18 to 24, 26.3% from 25 to 44, 24.9% from 45 to 64, and 14.5% who were 65 years of age or older. The median age was 38 years. For every 100 females, there were 94.9 males. For every 100 females age 18 and over, there were 93.4 males.

The median income for a household in the town was $33,750, and the median income for a family was $37,891. Males had a median income of $28,958 versus $21,328 for females. The per capita income for the town was $16,348. About 8.1% of families and 11.8% of the population were below the poverty line, including 16.1% of those under age 18 and 9.3% of those age 65 or over.

== Education ==
Genesee Valley Central School, located in nearby Belmont, was formed by a merger of the Angelica and Belmont school districts in 1996. The district serves ~600 students (PK-12). The district is also served by the Cattaraugus-Allegany-Erie-Wyoming BOCES system.

The school is located on County Road 48, on the north side of the Village of Belmont.

== Communities and locations in the Town of Angelica ==
- Angelica – The village of Angelica is centrally located in the town. It was formerly the county seat for Allegany County prior to the relocation of the seat to Belmont NY.
- Allegany County Fairgrounds – The fairgrounds are located on North Street in the village, and are the site of the annual Allegany County Fair which takes place at the end of July each year.

== Notable people ==
- Philip Schuyler Church (1778–1861), founder of the village and son of Angelica Schuyler Church.
- Calvin Fairbank (1816–1898), abolitionist minister, lived in Angelica and is buried in the Until the Day Dawn Cemetery.
- Charles N. Flenagin (1839–1881), district attorney and member of the New York State Assembly
- William B. Rochester (1789–1838), former US Congressman
- William B. Rochester (1826–1909), Paymaster-General of the United States Army
- Judson W. Sherman (1808–1881), former US Congressman
- Cornelius Mortimer Treat (1817–1916), Wisconsin farmer, teacher, and politician, was born in Angelica.
- Harvey Ellis (1852–1904), Arts & Crafts movement architect

== Climate ==
This climatic region is typified by large seasonal temperature differences, with warm to hot (and often humid) summers and cold (sometimes severely cold) winters. According to the Köppen Climate Classification system, Angelica has a humid continental climate, abbreviated "Dfb" on climate maps.

Climate data for the village of Angelica, New York, 1991–2020 normals, extremes 1893–present
Month	Jan	Feb	Mar	Apr	May	Jun	Jul	Aug	Sep	Oct	Nov	Dec	Year
Record high °F (°C)	71 (22)	75 (24)	83 (28)	90 (32)	93 (34)	100 (38)	104 (40)	98 (37)	96 (36)	94 (34)	80 (27)	70 (21)	104 (40)
Mean maximum °F (°C)	55.5 (13.1)	55.5 (13.1)	67.1 (19.5)	79.0 (26.1)	86.4 (30.2)	88.6 (31.4)	89.9 (32.2)	88.2 (31.2)	86.2 (30.1)	78.4 (25.8)	68.1 (20.1)	56.3 (13.5)	91.5 (33.1)
Mean daily maximum °F (°C)	32.6 (0.3)	35.3 (1.8)	44.2 (6.8)	57.4 (14.1)	69.3 (20.7)	76.4 (24.7)	80.2 (26.8)	78.4 (25.8)	72.0 (22.2)	60.3 (15.7)	47.8 (8.8)	37.3 (2.9)	57.6 (14.2)
Daily mean °F (°C)	22.9 (−5.1)	24.4 (−4.2)	32.3 (0.2)	44.0 (6.7)	55.2 (12.9)	63.5 (17.5)	67.4 (19.7)	65.8 (18.8)	59.2 (15.1)	48.2 (9.0)	38.2 (3.4)	28.9 (−1.7)	45.8 (7.7)
Mean daily minimum °F (°C)	13.3 (−10.4)	13.5 (−10.3)	20.4 (−6.4)	30.6 (−0.8)	41.2 (5.1)	50.5 (10.3)	54.6 (12.6)	53.3 (11.8)	46.3 (7.9)	36.1 (2.3)	28.7 (−1.8)	20.5 (−6.4)	34.1 (1.2)
Mean minimum °F (°C)	−13.6 (−25.3)	−9.4 (−23.0)	−2.9 (−19.4)	16.3 (−8.7)	26.0 (−3.3)	34.2 (1.2)	41.9 (5.5)	40.0 (4.4)	31.3 (−0.4)	22.1 (−5.5)	10.5 (−11.9)	−0.9 (−18.3)	−16.9 (−27.2)
Record low °F (°C)	−39 (−39)	−40 (−40)	−27 (−33)	−10 (−23)	14 (−10)	26 (−3)	32 (0)	27 (−3)	20 (−7)	9 (−13)	−15 (−26)	−26 (−32)	−40 (−40)
Average precipitation inches (mm)	2.58 (66)	1.98 (50)	2.68 (68)	3.35 (85)	3.54 (90)	4.21 (107)	4.05 (103)	4.13 (105)	3.92 (100)	3.85 (98)	2.96 (75)	2.93 (74)	40.18 (1,021)
Average snowfall inches (cm)	17.6 (45)	14.8 (38)	12.7 (32)	3.4 (8.6)	0.1 (0.25)	0.0 (0.0)	0.0 (0.0)	0.0 (0.0)	0.0 (0.0)	0.2 (0.51)	8.1 (21)	15.5 (39)	72.4 (184.36)
Average extreme snow depth inches (cm)	9.1 (23)	8.8 (22)	8.9 (23)	2.1 (5.3)	0.0 (0.0)	0.0 (0.0)	0.0 (0.0)	0.0 (0.0)	0.0 (0.0)	0.1 (0.25)	4.2 (11)	6.4 (16)	12.3 (31)
Average precipitation days (≥ 0.01 in)	15.1	11.9	12.7	14.0	13.6	13.2	12.4	11.6	11.7	14.6	13.5	14.0	158.3
Average snowy days (≥ 0.1 in)	11.0	9.0	6.2	2.0	0.1	0.0	0.0	0.0	0.0	0.2	4.4	8.3	41.2
Source 1: NOAA
Source 2: National Weather Service

== See also ==
- Angelica Raceway
