= Angelica Schuyler Church =

American socialite (1756–1814)

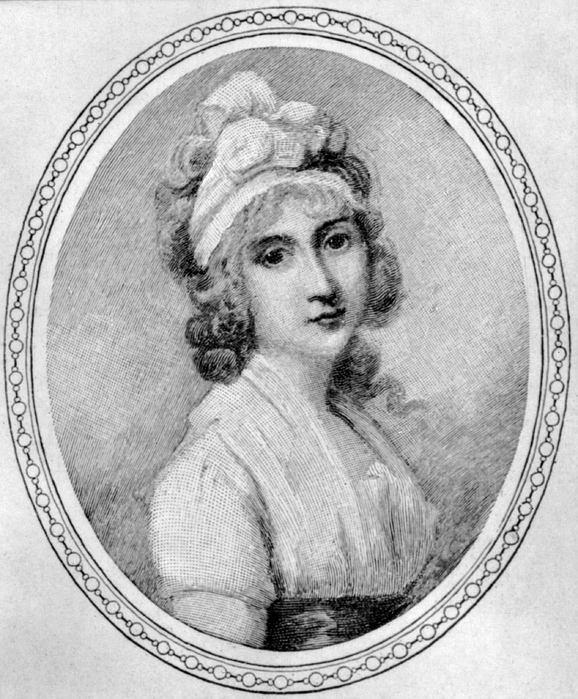
- Engraving from a painting of Angelica Church by Richard Cosway, c. 1790
- Born: Angelica Schuyler; February 20, 1756; Albany, Province of New York, British America
- Died: March 6, 1814 (aged 58); New York City, New York, U.S.
- Resting place: Trinity Church Cemetery
- Spouse: John Barker Church (m. 1777)
- Children: 8, including Philip Schuyler Church
- Parent(s): Philip Schuyler; Catherine Van Rensselaer
- Relatives: Elizabeth Schuyler Hamilton (sister); Margarita "Peggy" Schuyler Van Rensselaer (sister); Philip Jeremiah Schuyler (brother); Alexander Hamilton (brother-in-law); Stephen Van Rensselaer III (brother-in-law)
- Family: Schuyler

Angelica Church (née Schuyler /ˈskaɪlər/; February 20, 1756 – March 6, 1814) was an American socialite. She was the eldest daughter of Continental Army General Philip Schuyler, and a sister of Elizabeth Schuyler Hamilton and sister-in-law of Alexander Hamilton.

For sixteen years, she lived in Europe with her British-born husband, John Barker Church, who became a Member of Parliament. She was a prominent member of the social elite everywhere she lived, which included Albany and New York City, as well as Paris and London. Some of her correspondence with eminent friends has been preserved, including notable exchanges with Thomas Jefferson, her brother-in-law Alexander Hamilton, and Marquis de Lafayette.

The village and surrounding town of Angelica, New York were named after her.

== Early life ==
Angelica Schuyler was born in Albany, New York. She was the eldest child of Philip Schuyler and Catherine Van Rensselaer Schuyler. Her parents were from wealthy Dutch families prominent since early colonial days. Catherine was a descendant of Kiliaen van Rensselaer, one of the founders of New Netherlands. The Schuylers were also fourth-generation residents. She had fourteen siblings, seven of which lived to adulthood, including Elizabeth Schuyler Hamilton, Margarita Schuyler Van Rensselaer (known as "Peggy"), and Philip Jeremiah Schuyler.

Angelica came of age during the troubled times leading up to the American Revolution, and met many prominent Revolutionary leaders. Because of her father's rank and political stature, the Schuyler house in Albany was the scene of many meetings and war councils.

One of the visitors in 1776 was John Barker Church, a British-born merchant who made a fortune during the war supplying the American and French armies. At the time of their meeting and subsequent courtship, Church was on a mission from the Continental Congress to audit army supply records. Knowing that her father would not bless their marriage because of his suspicions about Church's past, Angelica eloped with John in 1777. They had eight children together.

== Life in Europe ==
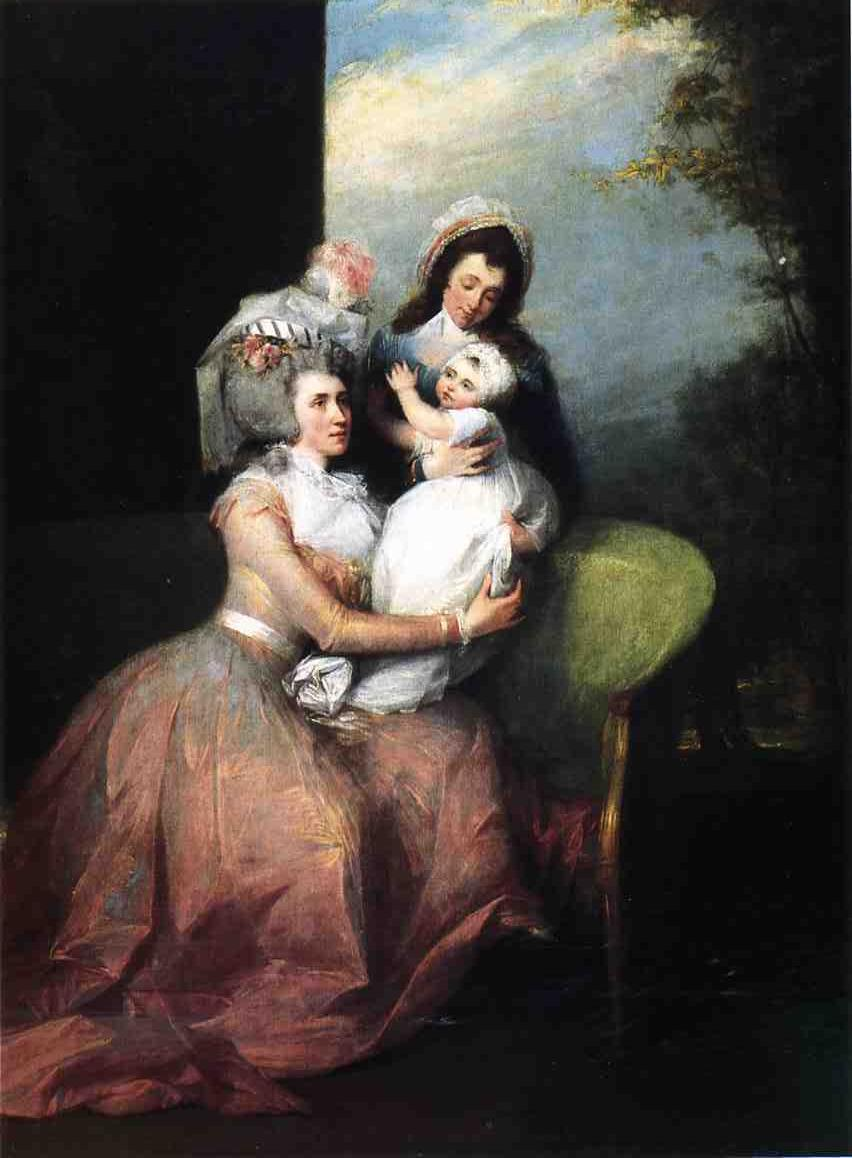
Portrait of Angelica Church, detail of a painting by John Trumbull, c. 1785

In 1783, Angelica and her family left for Europe, where they remained for 16 years, apart from brief visits to America.

From 1783 to 1785, Angelica and her family lived in Paris while John performed his duties as a U.S. envoy to the French government. Angelica never failed to enchant the famous, intelligent men she met, and in Paris she soon befriended Benjamin Franklin, who was then America's Minister to France. She also developed lasting friendships with Franklin's successor, Thomas Jefferson, and with the Marquis de Lafayette.

After a brief visit to New York in 1785, the family sailed for England, taking up residence in London. As the wife of a very wealthy man, Angelica entered a fashionable social circle that included the Prince of Wales (later King George IV), Whig party leader Charles James Fox, and playwright Richard Brinsley Sheridan. She also befriended and sponsored the émigré American painter John Trumbull, whose works included some of the most famous portraits of the American Revolutionary War era. Artists Richard and Maria Cosway also numbered among her close acquaintances in Europe.

In 1788, with John planning to run for British Parliament, the family purchased a country house in Wendover, Buckinghamshire. John served as a Member of Parliament from 1790 to 1796. During this period, Angelica made a visit home in 1789 to attend the inauguration of George Washington as the first president of the United States.

== Return to America and founding of Angelica, N.Y. ==
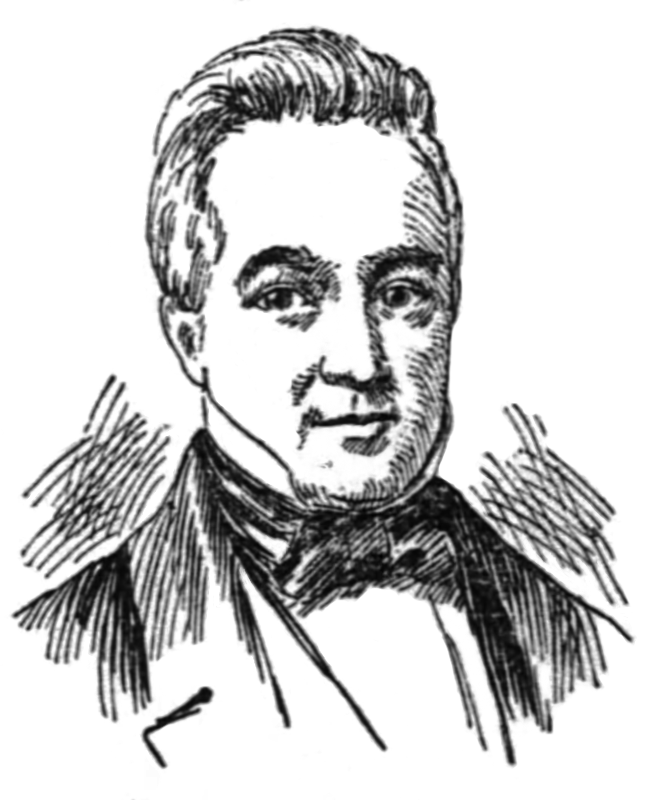
Philip Schuyler Church, eldest son of Angelica and John Barker Church

John and Angelica Church returned to the United States in May 1797 for a visit, and returned permanently in 1799 to be reunited with the Schuyler family in New York.

In May 1796, John Barker Church accepted a mortgage on 100,000 acres (40,000 ha) of land in present-day Allegany County and Genesee County, New York, against a debt owed to him by his friend Robert Morris. After Morris failed to pay the mortgage, the Churches' eldest son Philip Schuyler Church acquired the land in a foreclosure sale in May 1800. To take possession of the land, Philip traveled in 1801 to the area, near the Pennsylvania border, with his surveyor Moses Van Campen and four others. Philip Church selected specific acreage for a planned village along the Genesee River, with plots and design to be reminiscent of Paris. The plan included a circular road enclosing a village park at the center of town, streets radiating from the circular road to form a star, and five churches situated around the circle. Philip named the village Angelica, after his mother. By 1803, the village was populated with log cabin homes, including Philip's, and he had erected a sawmill and a gristmill.

Philip Church married Anna Matilda Stewart in Philadelphia on February 4, 1805. Soon after the wedding, the two settled permanently in the village of Angelica, where a small whitewashed house (locally known as the "White House") had already been built for the couple on the banks of the Genesee River.

In 1806, Angelica and John Barker Church began construction on a thirty-room mansion nearby, called Belvidere, which still stands as a privately owned home on the banks of the Genesee in Belmont, New York, near the town of Angelica. Although they had intended to make it their summer home, it instead became the residence of Philip and Anna Church when it was partially completed in 1810.

== Correspondence and personal life ==
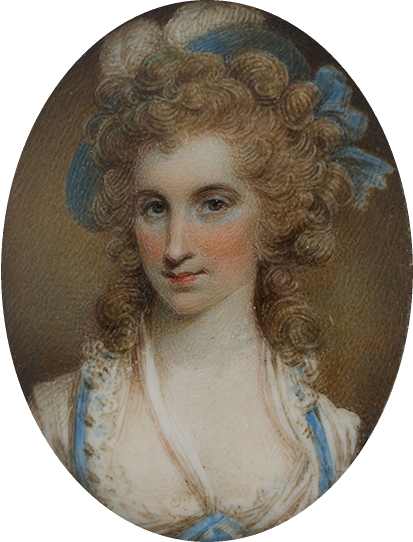
Detail of miniature portrait by Samuel Shelley, thought to resemble Angelica Church.

Many examples of Angelica Church's personal correspondence with eminent figures such as Thomas Jefferson, Alexander Hamilton, George Washington, and the Marquis de Lafayette are preserved in the Library of Congress and other archives. In 1996, the University of Virginia purchased a series of 77 letters, including 13 from Jefferson, that had previously been kept in her family's possession.

=== Thomas Jefferson ===
In the winter of 1787-1788, Angelica Church befriended U.S. Minister Plenipotentiary to France Thomas Jefferson in Paris. Church had traveled to France from England to enroll her young daughter in school at the "Pentemont Abbey", where Catharine Church became classmates with Polly Jefferson. After meeting her, Jefferson reported his opinion of Church to their mutual friend, Maria Cosway: "I find in her all the good the world has given her credit for." Jefferson later described their circle of friends in Paris (which included John Trumbull, the Lafayettes, the Cornys, and others) as "our charming coterie," and he recalled their time together as "those scenes for which alone my heart was made." That winter, Americans everywhere were debating the proposed U.S. Constitution, which had not yet been ratified, but Thomas Jefferson discouraged Angelica Church's political interests, arguing that, "The tender breasts of ladies were not formed for political convulsion; and the French ladies miscalculate much their own happiness when they wander from the true field of their influence into that of politicks." Adept at subtlety, Angelica Church responded by simply sending Thomas Jefferson the copy of the Federalist Papers that she had received from her sister, Elizabeth Hamilton. In a letter to Church, Jefferson ardently wrote, "Think of it, my friend, and let us begin a negotiation on the subject. You shall find in me all the spirit of accommodation with which Yorick began his with the fair Piedmontese." Jefferson alludes to a sexually charged scene in Laurence Sterne's then-popular novel A Sentimental Journey Through France and Italy, in which a parson named Yorick has to negotiate sleeping arrangements when obliged to share a room with an attractive Italian woman and her maid.

=== Alexander Hamilton ===
In view of a flirtatious attitude that fueled contemporary gossip, there has long been speculation that Angelica may have had a romantic relationship with Hamilton. Correspondence between the two, now preserved in the Library of Congress, demonstrates the strong friendship and affection between them. Hamilton biographer Ron Chernow wrote that "the attraction between Hamilton and Angelica was so potent and obvious that many people assumed they were lovers. At the very least, theirs was a friendship of unusual ardor." Hamilton biographer Willard Sterne Randall and Albany historian Warren Roberts state that Hamilton and Angelica did have an affair.

In a 1794 letter to her sister Eliza, sent from London, Angelica wrote effusively of her affection for "your Husband, for I love him very much and if you were as generous as the old Romans, you would lend him to me for a little while." Angelica's extended absence from America, as well as the Schuyler family's continued devotion to Hamilton, lend support to the view that Angelica's banter was a joke between sisters rather than evidence of an actual affair.

== Children ==
Angelica and John Barker Church had eight children together. They were:

- Philip Schuyler Church (1778–1861), who served as a U.S. Army captain and aide de camp to Alexander Hamilton in 1798–1800, when Hamilton was Major General of the Army during the Quasi-War with France. Philip was a lawyer and judge, and founder of the town of Angelica, New York. He married Anna Matilda Stewart (1786–1865), daughter of General Walter Stewart.
- Catharine "Kitty" Church (1779–1839), who married Bertram Peter Cruger (1774–1854)
- John Barker Church II (1781–1865)
- Elizabeth Matilda Church (1783–1867), who married Rudolph Bunner (1779–1837)
- Richard Hamilton Church (1785–1786), died young
- Alexander Church (1792–1803), died young
- Richard Stephen Church (1798–1889), who married Grace Church
- Angelica Church (b. 1800)

== In popular culture ==
The role of Angelica is prominently featured in the Tony-winning 2015 musical Hamilton, written by Lin-Manuel Miranda. Renée Elise Goldsberry originated the role in the show's off-Broadway and Broadway productions, for which she won the 2016 Tony Award for Best Featured Actress in a Musical for her performance. Angelica has also been portrayed in the Broadway company of Hamilton by Mandy Gonzalez, and in touring companies by Montego Glover, Emmy Raver-Lampman, Karen Olivo, Sabrina Sloan, Rachel John, and Stephanie Umoh.

The show characterizes Angelica as a woman of extraordinary wit and intelligence. The closeness of her relationship with Hamilton is first shown in the song "Helpless", when Angelica jokes "I'm just sayin', if you really loved me, you would share him," echoing Angelica's actual 1794 letter to Eliza. Angelica's song "Satisfied" narrates a fictional flashback in which she reenacts falling in love with Hamilton at their first meeting, explaining that she stepped aside because her sister Eliza had also fallen in love with him. Angelica is also featured in the songs "The Schuyler Sisters", "Non-Stop", "Take a Break", "The Reynolds Pamphlet", "It's Quiet Uptown", and "Who Lives, Who Dies, Who Tells Your Story".

== See also ==
- Schuyler family
