= John Barker Church =

British businessman and MP (1748–1818)

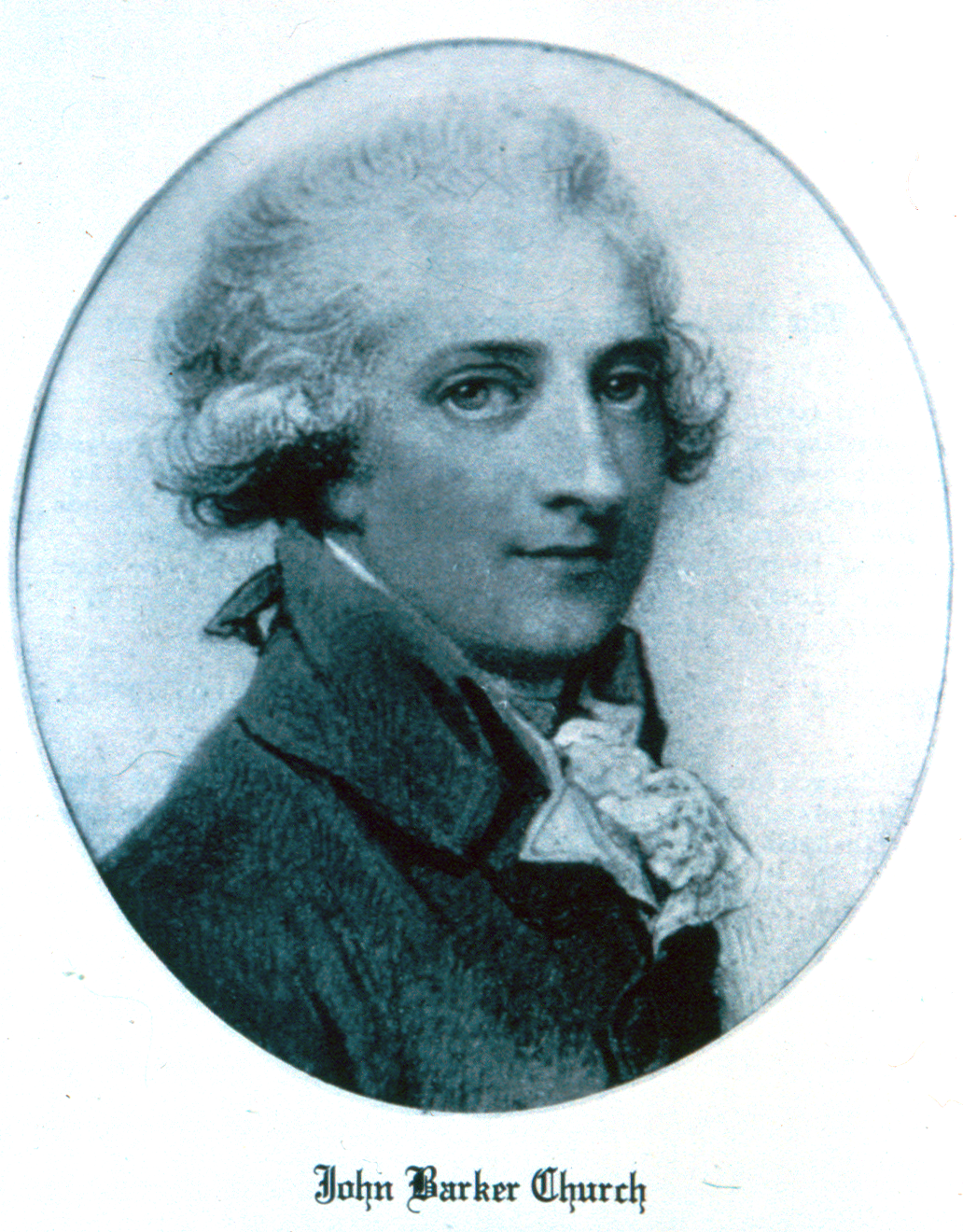
- An April 1818 portrait of Church

Member of Parliament for Wendover
- In office 1790–1796
- Preceded by: Robert Burton
- Succeeded by: John Hiley Addington

Personal details
- Born: 30 October 1748 Lowestoft, England
- Died: 27 April 1818 (aged 69) London, England
- Resting place: Westminster St James, Piccadilly, London
- Party: Whig
- Spouse: Angelica Schuyler Church (m. 1777; died 1814)
- Children: 8

John Barker Church, a.k.a. John Carter, (October 30, 1748 – April 27, 1818), was an English born businessman and supplier of the Continental Army during the American Revolutionary War.

He returned to England after the Revolutionary War and served in the House of Commons from 1790 until 1796. He was known for his marriage to Angelica Schuyler Church, of the prominent American Schuyler family, and being the brother-in-law of Alexander Hamilton, who died in a duel in 1804 with Aaron Burr, with whom Church had also had a duel in 1799.

== Early life ==
John Barker Church was born on October 30, 1748, in Lowestoft in eastern England, the son of Richard Church (1697–1774) of Great Yarmouth, Norfolk by Elizabeth Barker (1701–1800), daughter of John Barker.

== Career ==
Church was set up in business in London by his mother's brother, a wealthy uncle named John Barker who was a director of the London Assurance Company. It was reported that speculation on the stock exchange and gambling were responsible for his bankruptcy in August 1774.

To escape his creditors he went to America, where he became one of three commissioners appointed by the Continental Congress in July 1776 to audit the accounts of the army in the northern department. There he operated under a nom de guerre as John Carter. He resigned his commission in September 1777, and moved to Boston, Massachusetts. In Boston, he began a variety of businesses, including banking and shipping, and speculated in currency and land. In 1780, along with his business partner, Col. Jeremiah Wadsworth of Hartford, Connecticut, he secured a contract for provisioning the French forces in America, becoming Commissary General. Two years later, they were contracted as sole suppliers to the American army as well, and ended up making a fortune.

=== Return to England ===
After the war, Church and his family lived in Paris from 1783 until 1785 while he performed his duties as a U.S. envoy to the French government. After briefly returning to America in 1785, Church and his family left for England the same year. In 1788, the Churches bought the Verney property at Wendover so that he could run for Parliament, which he did in 1790, when he was elected a Member of Parliament for Wendover. Prior to his election, he was involved with the Marquis de la Luzerne, the French ambassador in some unsuccessful stock speculation during the Nootka Crisis, a dispute between Great Britain and Spain.

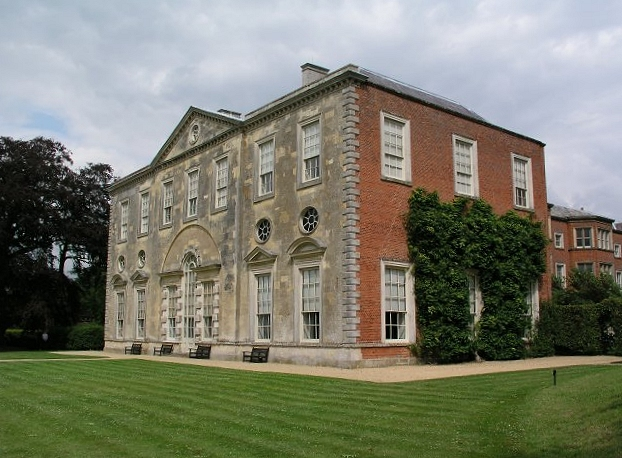
this is Claydon House not Wendover

==== Member of Parliament ====
In December 1790, during his time in Parliament, he voted to approve Prime Minister William Pitt's plan to pay off the debts incurred in rearmament, after having previously been against the government on the Spanish convention. After his vote, he suggested the government should investigate the great amount of money held by trustees of public lands, himself included, not being utilized rather than interfere with unpaid Bank dividends. The Prime Minister thanked him for highlighting the issue. In 1791, William Curtis raised the issue again with a motion for inquiry into the trustees of Ramsgate harbour over their possession of funds. Church was appointed to the select committee as he supported the idea.

In 1791, he voted in favor of the unsuccessful attempt to repeal the Test Act in Scotland. Also in 1791 and again in 1792, he voted with the opposition in the Oczakov debates concerning the Russian occupation of the Turkish port of Ochakiv on the Black Sea. In 1793, he joined the Friends of the People and voted for Grey's motion for inquiry into parliamentary reform, which did not achieve success until 1832. In December 1792, he voted against his fellow Whig, and party leader, Charles Fox's Libel amendment, but opposed the French war. Thereafter, Church regularly voted with the Foxite minority for the rest of his parliamentary career.

In 1795, Church was described part of "a party of English Jacobins" who if acted upon their statements, would be "compromised to the extreme," by Gouverneur Morris, the former American minister to France. In 1794, he tried with Fox, to stall discussions of an emigration bill in the House. In 1795, Church defended the proceedings at the Middlesex County meeting that was called to petition against the proposed legislation that he deemed repressive. Church was known for his hospitality of French émigrés after the Reign of Terror, paying for Talleyrand's journey and tour of America, and being involved in an attempt to free the Marquis de Lafayette from prison. By 1796, he sold his property at Wendover to the Right Hon. Robert, Lord Carrington, and retired from the House of Commons.

=== Return to the United States ===
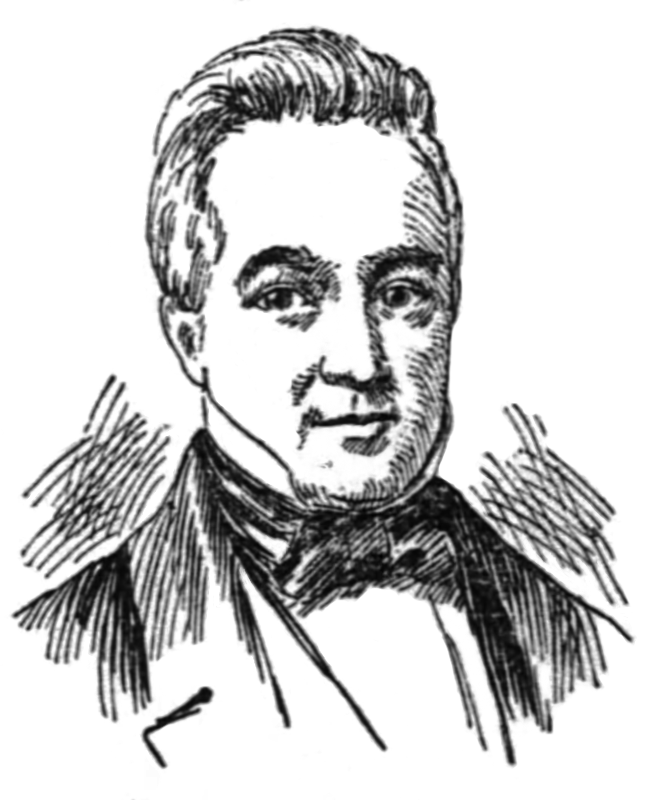
Wood engraving from a portrait of Philip Schuyler Church, son of John and Angelica Church

The Church family returned to America for a visit in 1797, and then returned permanently in 1799 to New York, where Church became a founding director of the Manhattan Company and a director of the Bank of North America.

In May 1796, Church accepted a mortgage on 100,000 acres (40,000 ha) of land, a portion of the Phelps and Gorham Purchase in present-day Allegany County and Genesee County, New York, against a debt owed to him by his friend Robert Morris. After Morris failed to pay the mortgage, Church foreclosed, and his son Philip Schuyler Church acquired the land in May 1800. To take possession of the land, Philip Church traveled to the area, near the Pennsylvania border, with his surveyor Moses Van Campen. Philip Church selected specific acreage along the Genesee River for a planned village, which he laid out to be reminiscent of Paris, including a village park in the center of town, enclosed by a circular road with streets radiating from it to form a star, and five churches situated around the circle. Philip settled there in a log cabin, and built a house when he married in 1805. He named the village Angelica, New York, after his mother.

John and Angelica Church befriended many French upper-class refugees from the French Revolution, helping them settle in Allegany County and elsewhere throughout the United States. In 1806, the Churches began construction on a thirty-room mansion near the village of Angelica, called Belvidere, which still stands as a privately owned home on the banks of the Genesee in Belmont, New York. Although they had intended to make it their summer home, it instead became the residence of their son Philip and his wife when it was partially completed in 1810.

In 1800, Church was admitted as an honorary member of the New York Society of the Cincinnati.

== Burr–Hamilton duelling pistols ==
Church was an experienced duellist, and owned the Wogdon pistols used in the 1804 Burr–Hamilton duel. The weapons had already been used in an 1801 duel, in which Hamilton's son Philip was killed. Following the duel, the pistols were returned to Church, and reposed at his Belvidere estate until the late 19th century.

Later legend claimed that these pistols were the same ones used in a 1799 duel between Church and Burr, in which neither man was injured. This makes sense according to the accepted rules of the 'code duello', in which the challenged (in this case, Church) had the right to choose the weapons. However, the same rule was apparently ignored in the 1801 duel, where Philip Hamilton was the challenger and also supplied the weapons borrowed from his uncle. Also, Burr claimed in his memoir that he owned the pistols used in his duel with Church. Hamilton biographer Ron Chernow accepts Burr's version of the story.

== Personal life ==
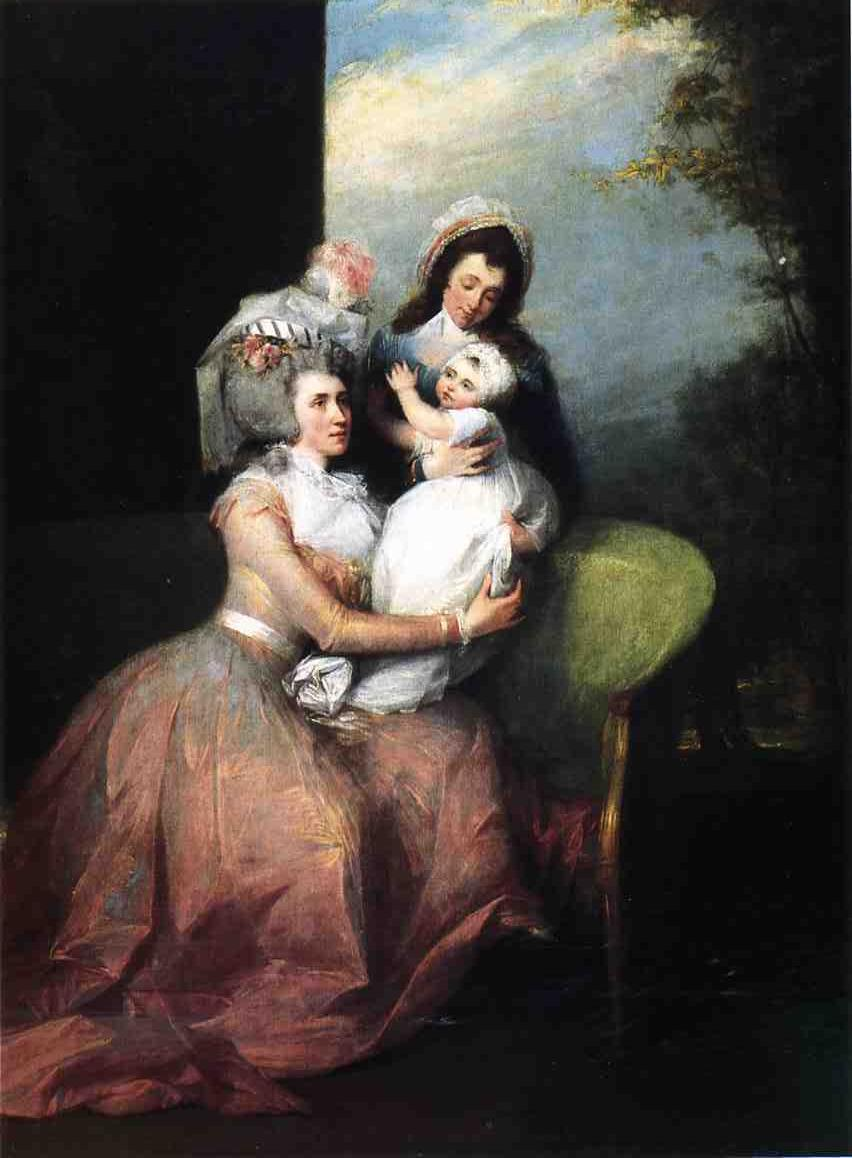
Mrs. John Barker Church, Son Philip, and Servant, oil on canvas, John Trumbull, c. 1785

In 1776, Church met Angelica Schuyler (1756–1814), a daughter of General Philip Schuyler, during a visit to her father's house, the Schuyler Mansion.

Knowing her father would not bless their marriage because of his suspicions about Church's past, Angelica and John eloped in 1777. It is not clear when her parents learned of their new son-in-law's actual name, as General Schuyler complained, "Carter and my eldest daughter ran off and married on the 23rd inst. Unacquainted with his family, his connections and situation in life, the match was exceedingly disagreeable to me, and I had signified it to him."

Together, John and Angelica had 8 children:

- Philip Schuyler Church (1778–1861), served as aide de camp to Hamilton, who married Anna Mathilda Stewart (1786–1865), daughter of General Walter Stewart; and was a founder of the Erie Canal and Erie Railroad
- Catharine "Kitty" Church (1779–1839), who married Bertram Peter Cruger (1774–1854)
- John Barker Church II (1781–1865)
- Elizabeth Matilda Church (1783–1867), who married Rudolph Bunner (1779–1837)
- Richard Hamilton Church (1785–1786), died young
- Alexander Church (1792–1803), died young
- Richard Stephen Church (1798–1889), who married Grace Church
- Angelica Church (b. 1800)

Belvidere, the Church family estate in rural western New York, was listed on the National Register of Historic Places in 1972 as a prime example of Federal style architecture.

After the death of his wife in 1814, Church returned to England. He died in London on April 27, 1818, after a short illness, and was buried at St. James, Piccadilly. By this time, his estate was only worth a modest £1,500.

== Sources ==
- Chernow, Ron (2004). Alexander Hamilton. The Penguin Press. ISBN 1-59420-009-2
- Phelan, Helene C. (1981). The Man Who Owned the Pistols: John Barker Church and His Family. Heart of the Lakes Pub, Interlaken, NY; ISBN 978-0-9605836-0-7

Parliament of Great Britain
Preceded by Robert Burdon; John Ord	Member of Parliament for Wendover; 1790–1796; With: Hon. Hugh Seymour-Conway	Succeeded by John Hiley Addington; George Canning
