= Angelica (village), New York =

Angelica, New York
- Village
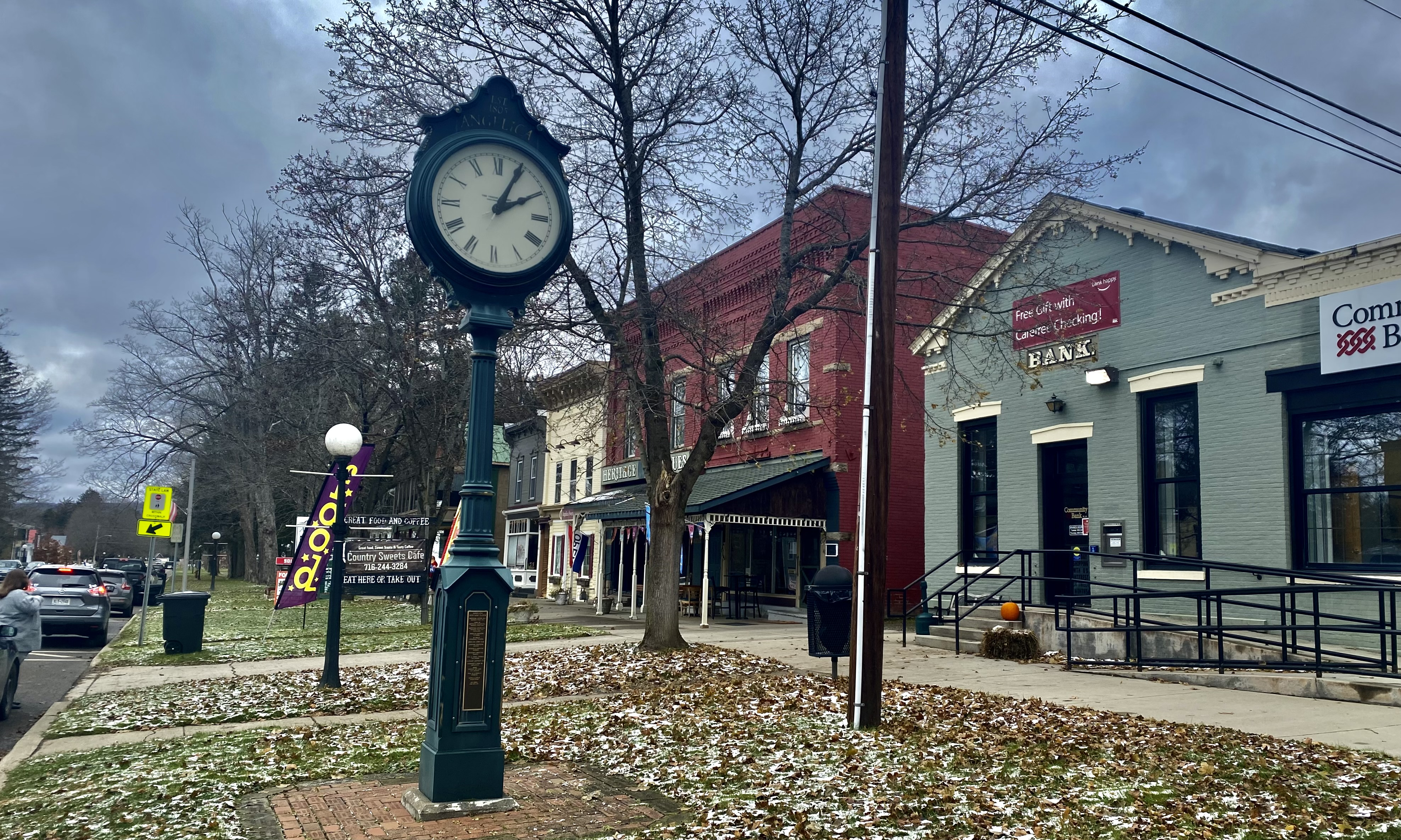
- West Main Street

- Location within the state of New York Angelica (the United States) Angelica (North America)
- Coordinates: 42°18′23″N 78°1′7″W
- Country: United States
- State: New York
- County: Allegany
- Town: Angelica
- Incorporated: 1835

Area
  - Total: 2.15 sq mi (5.57 km^{2})
  - Land: 2.15 sq mi (5.57 km^{2})
  - Water: 0 sq mi (0.00 km^{2})
- Elevation: 1,434 ft (437 m)

Population (2020)
  - Total: 723
  - Density: 336.0/sq mi (129.72/km^{2})
- Time zone: UTC-5 (Eastern (EST))
  - Summer (DST): UTC-4 (EDT)
- ZIP code: 14709
- Area code: 585
- FIPS code: 36-02176
- GNIS feature ID: 942478
- Website: www.villageofangelica.gov

Angelica is a village in the town of Angelica in Allegany County, New York, United States. The population was 869 at the 2010 census. The village and the town are named after Angelica Schuyler Church, a daughter of General Philip Schuyler, sister-in-law of Founding Father Alexander Hamilton and wife of John Barker Church.

== History ==
The community was the first to be settled in the town of Angelica, in 1802. The village of Angelica was incorporated in 1835. Angelica was formerly the county seat until the county government switched to Belmont. Founded by Philip Church, nephew of Elizabeth Schuyler Hamilton. Philip Church took a large tract of land that he had inherited in upstate New York and established the town of Angelica, named in his mother's honor. In 1830, the population of Angelica was 998.

The Old Allegany County Courthouse was listed on the National Register of Historic Places in 1972. The Angelica Park Circle Historic District was listed in 1978.

== Geography ==
The village is located near the center of the town of Angelica, in the valley of Angelica Creek, a tributary of the Genesee River. The Southern Tier Expressway (Interstate 86 and New York State Route 17) passes through the southern part of the village, with access from exit 31. The expressway leads west 31 miles (50 km) to Olean and east 62 miles (100 km) to Corning.

According to the United States Census Bureau, the village has an area of 2.15 square miles (5.57 km^{2}), all land.

The county fairgrounds are located in the eastern part of the village. Park Circle, in the village center, includes a roque court. Dubbed the "Town where History Lives", Angelica is home to a number of antique shops which attract shoppers from throughout the state.

=== Climate ===
This climatic region is typified by large seasonal temperature differences, with warm-to-hot (and often humid) summers and cold (sometimes severely cold) winters. According to the Köppen Climate Classification system, Angelica has a humid continental climate, abbreviated "Dfb" on climate maps.

Climate data for the village of Angelica, New York, 1991–2020 normals, extremes 1893–present
Month	Jan	Feb	Mar	Apr	May	Jun	Jul	Aug	Sep	Oct	Nov	Dec	Year
Record high °F (°C)	71 (22)	75 (24)	83 (28)	90 (32)	93 (34)	100 (38)	104 (40)	98 (37)	96 (36)	94 (34)	80 (27)	70 (21)	104 (40)
Mean maximum °F (°C)	55.5 (13.1)	55.5 (13.1)	67.1 (19.5)	79.0 (26.1)	86.4 (30.2)	88.6 (31.4)	89.9 (32.2)	88.2 (31.2)	86.2 (30.1)	78.4 (25.8)	68.1 (20.1)	56.3 (13.5)	91.5 (33.1)
Mean daily maximum °F (°C)	32.6 (0.3)	35.3 (1.8)	44.2 (6.8)	57.4 (14.1)	69.3 (20.7)	76.4 (24.7)	80.2 (26.8)	78.4 (25.8)	72.0 (22.2)	60.3 (15.7)	47.8 (8.8)	37.3 (2.9)	57.6 (14.2)
Daily mean °F (°C)	22.9 (−5.1)	24.4 (−4.2)	32.3 (0.2)	44.0 (6.7)	55.2 (12.9)	63.5 (17.5)	67.4 (19.7)	65.8 (18.8)	59.2 (15.1)	48.2 (9.0)	38.2 (3.4)	28.9 (−1.7)	45.8 (7.7)
Mean daily minimum °F (°C)	13.3 (−10.4)	13.5 (−10.3)	20.4 (−6.4)	30.6 (−0.8)	41.2 (5.1)	50.5 (10.3)	54.6 (12.6)	53.3 (11.8)	46.3 (7.9)	36.1 (2.3)	28.7 (−1.8)	20.5 (−6.4)	34.1 (1.2)
Mean minimum °F (°C)	−13.6 (−25.3)	−9.4 (−23.0)	−2.9 (−19.4)	16.3 (−8.7)	26.0 (−3.3)	34.2 (1.2)	41.9 (5.5)	40.0 (4.4)	31.3 (−0.4)	22.1 (−5.5)	10.5 (−11.9)	−0.9 (−18.3)	−16.9 (−27.2)
Record low °F (°C)	−39 (−39)	−40 (−40)	−27 (−33)	−10 (−23)	14 (−10)	26 (−3)	32 (0)	27 (−3)	20 (−7)	9 (−13)	−15 (−26)	−26 (−32)	−40 (−40)
Average precipitation inches (mm)	2.58 (66)	1.98 (50)	2.68 (68)	3.35 (85)	3.54 (90)	4.21 (107)	4.05 (103)	4.13 (105)	3.92 (100)	3.85 (98)	2.96 (75)	2.93 (74)	40.18 (1,021)
Average snowfall inches (cm)	17.6 (45)	14.8 (38)	12.7 (32)	3.4 (8.6)	0.1 (0.25)	0.0 (0.0)	0.0 (0.0)	0.0 (0.0)	0.0 (0.0)	0.2 (0.51)	8.1 (21)	15.5 (39)	72.4 (184.36)
Average extreme snow depth inches (cm)	9.1 (23)	8.8 (22)	8.9 (23)	2.1 (5.3)	0.0 (0.0)	0.0 (0.0)	0.0 (0.0)	0.0 (0.0)	0.0 (0.0)	0.1 (0.25)	4.2 (11)	6.4 (16)	12.3 (31)
Average precipitation days (≥ 0.01 in)	15.1	11.9	12.7	14.0	13.6	13.2	12.4	11.6	11.7	14.6	13.5	14.0	158.3
Average snowy days (≥ 0.1 in)	11.0	9.0	6.2	2.0	0.1	0.0	0.0	0.0	0.0	0.2	4.4	8.3	41.2
Source 1: NOAA
Source 2: National Weather Service

== Demographics ==
Historical population
Census	Pop.	Note	%±
1840	900		—
1850	1,200		33.3%
1860	846		−29.5%
1870	991		17.1%
1880	705		−28.9%
1890	953		35.2%
1900	978		2.6%
1910	1,056		8.0%
1920	972		−8.0%
1930	838		−13.8%
1940	928		10.7%
1950	928		0.0%
1960	898		−3.2%
1970	948		5.6%
1980	982		3.6%
1990	963		−1.9%
2000	903		−6.2%
2010	869		−3.8%
2020	723		−16.8%
U.S. Decennial Census

As of the census of 2000, there were 903 people, 366 households, and 243 families residing in the village. The population density was 420.5 inhabitants per square mile (162.4/km^{2}). There were 409 housing units at an average density of 190.5 per square mile (73.6/km^{2}). The racial makeup of the village was 98.01% White, 0.78% Native American, 0.11% Asian, and 1.11% from two or more races. Hispanic or Latino of any race were 0.44% of the population.

There were 366 households, out of which 32.5% had children under the age of 18 living with them, 52.2% were married couples living together, 12.6% had a female householder with no husband present, and 33.6% were non-families. 28.1% of all households were made up of individuals, and 12.6% had someone living alone who was 65 years of age or older. The average household size was 2.47 and the average family size was 3.04.

In the village, the population was spread out, with 27.5% under the age of 18, 8.7% from 18 to 24, 25.6% from 25 to 44, 24.1% from 45 to 64, and 14.1% who were 65 years of age or older. The median age was 36 years. For every 100 females, there were 87.3 males. For every 100 females age 18 and over, there were 87.7 males.

The median income for a household in the village was $32,734, and the median income for a family was $37,500. Males had a median income of $27,440 versus $20,893 for females. The per capita income for the village was $15,486. About 10.2% of families and 12.5% of the population were below the poverty line, including 18.1% of those under age 18 and 8.7% of those age 65 or over.

== Education ==
Genesee Valley Central School, located in nearby Belmont, was formed by a merger of the Angelica and Belmont school districts in 1996. The district serves ~600 students (PK-12). The district is also served by the Cattaraugus-Allegany-Erie-Wyoming BOCES system.

The school is located on County Road 48, on the north side of the Village of Belmont.
