= Belmont Literary and Historical Society Free Library =

- U.S. National Register of Historic Places
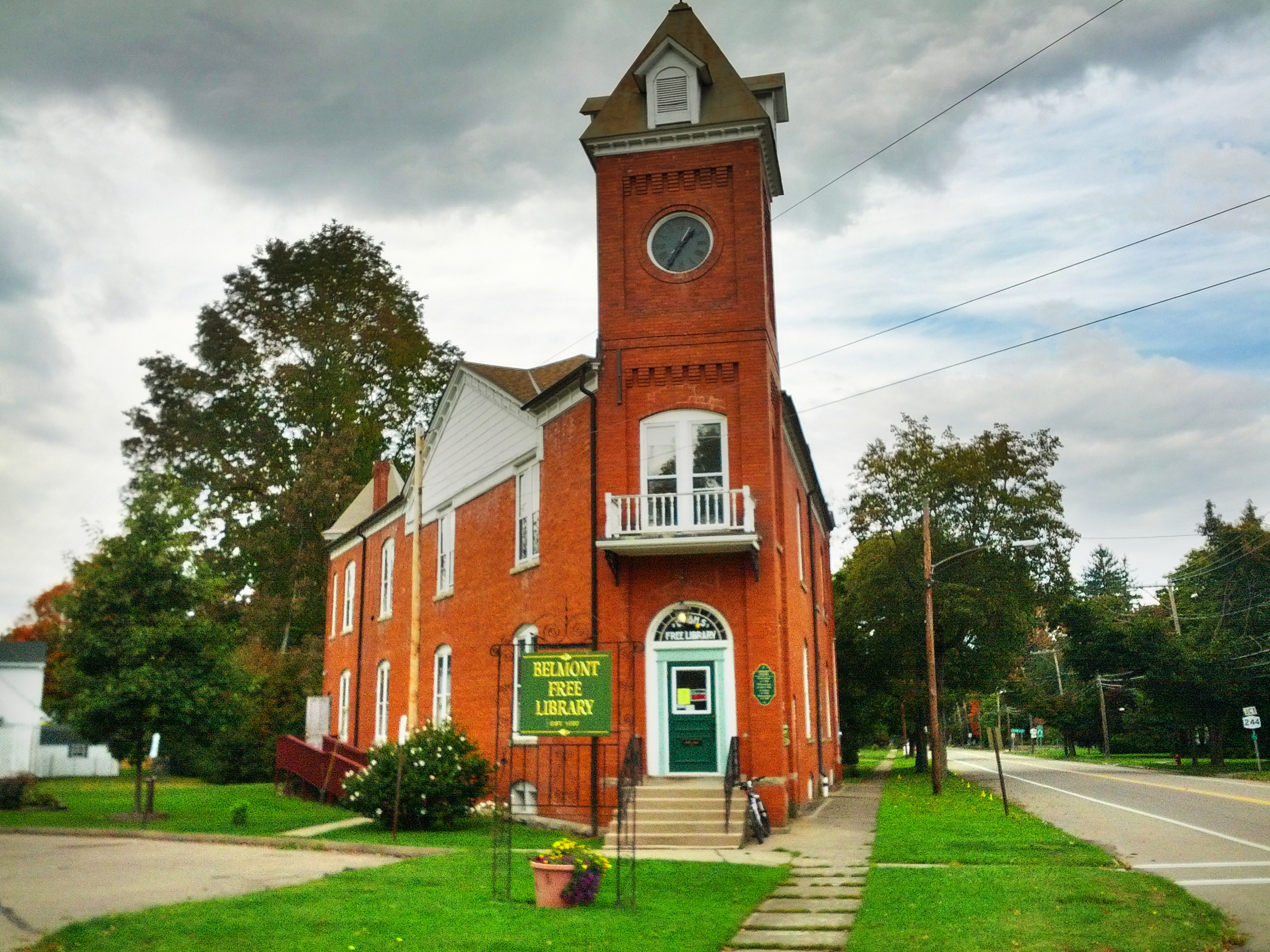
- Belmont Literary and Historical Society Free Library, September 2012

- Location within New York Location within the United States
- Location: 2 Willets Ave., Belmont, New York
- Coordinates: 42°13′24″N 78°2′9″W
- Area: less than one acre
- Built: 1893
- Architects: Tuthill, N.G.; Ward, Rev. John
- Architectural style: Late Victorian, Victorian Eclectic
- NRHP reference No.: 03000599
- Added to NRHP: July 05, 2003

Belmont Literary and Historical Society Free Library, also known as the Belmont Free Library, is a historic library building located at Belmont in Allegany County, New York. It was built between 1893 and 1904, and is an example of late 19th century vernacular public architecture. It is a two-story, triangular brick structure that features a three-story clock tower.

It was listed on the National Register of Historic Places in 2003.
