= Belmont Grange No. 1243 =

- Belmont Grange #1243
- U.S. National Register of Historic Places
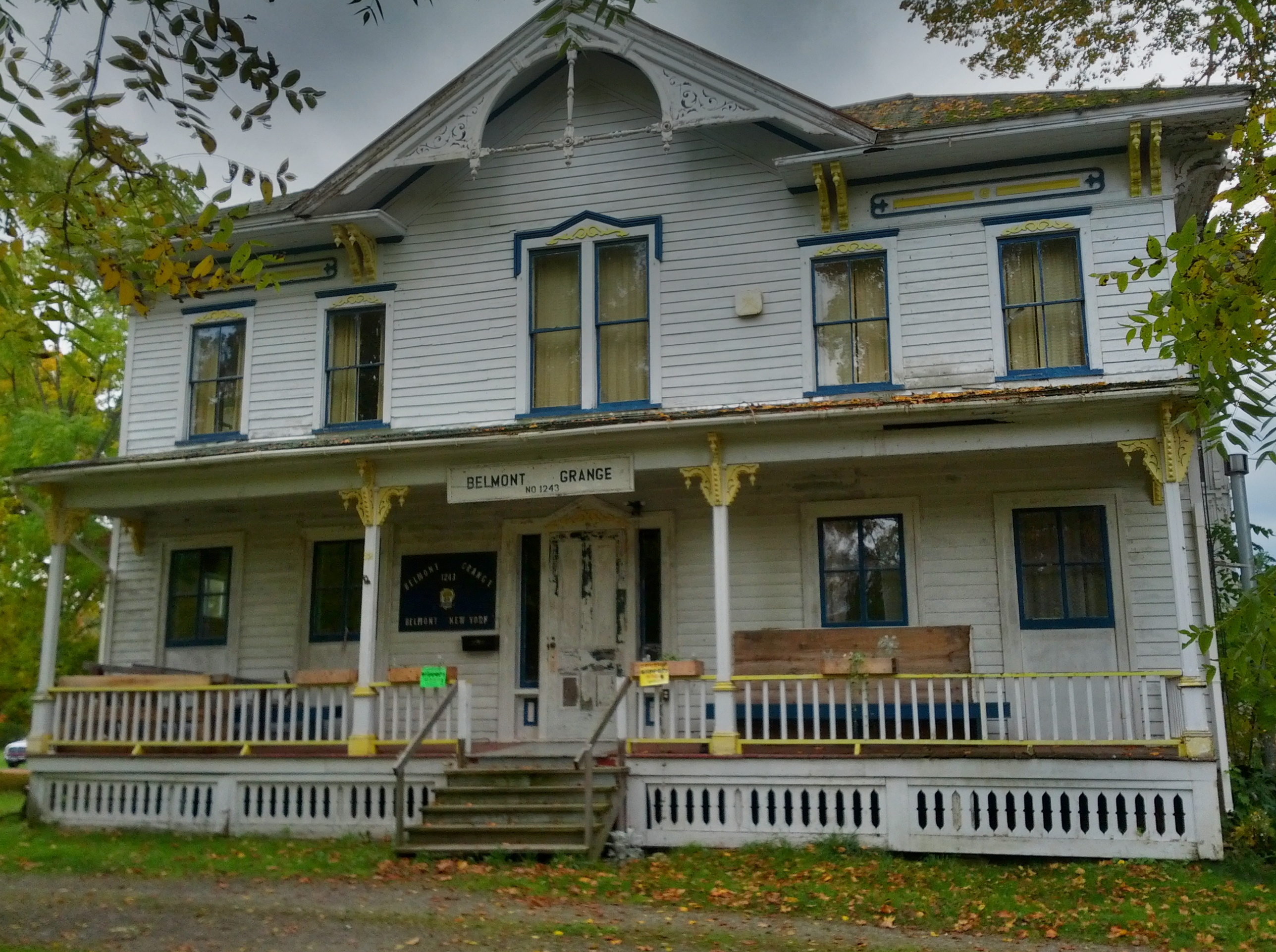
- Belmont Grange No. 1243, September 2012

- Location within New York Location within the United States
- Location: 32 Willets Ave., Belmont, New York
- Coordinates: 42°13′30″N 78°2′25″W
- Area: 1.1 acres (0.45 ha)
- Built: 1860
- Architectural style: Italianate, Queen Anne
- NRHP reference No.: 05001533
- Added to NRHP: January 18, 2006

Belmont Grange #1243, also known as Andrew McNett Residence, is a historic grange building located at Belmont in Allegany County, New York. It was built about 1860 in the Italianate style by Andrew McNett, an attorney, Civil War veteran, and subsequently the village's first mayor. The McNett family undertook modifications about 1890 to the Queen Anne style. In 1923, the property was transferred to the Independent Order of Odd Fellows. The Grange purchased the property in 1937.

It was listed on the National Register of Historic Places in 2006.

The Grange Building was demolished in 2021.

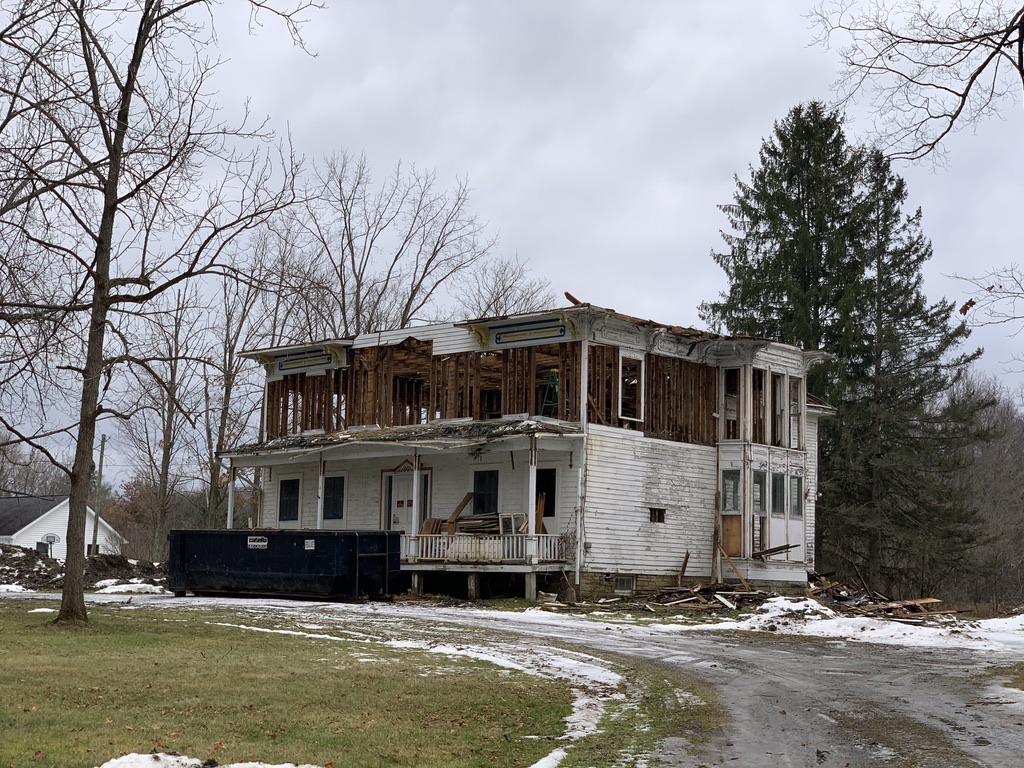
The Belmont Grange during demolition.
