= Angelica Park Circle Historic District =

Historic district in New York, United States

- U.S. National Register of Historic Places
- U.S. Historic district
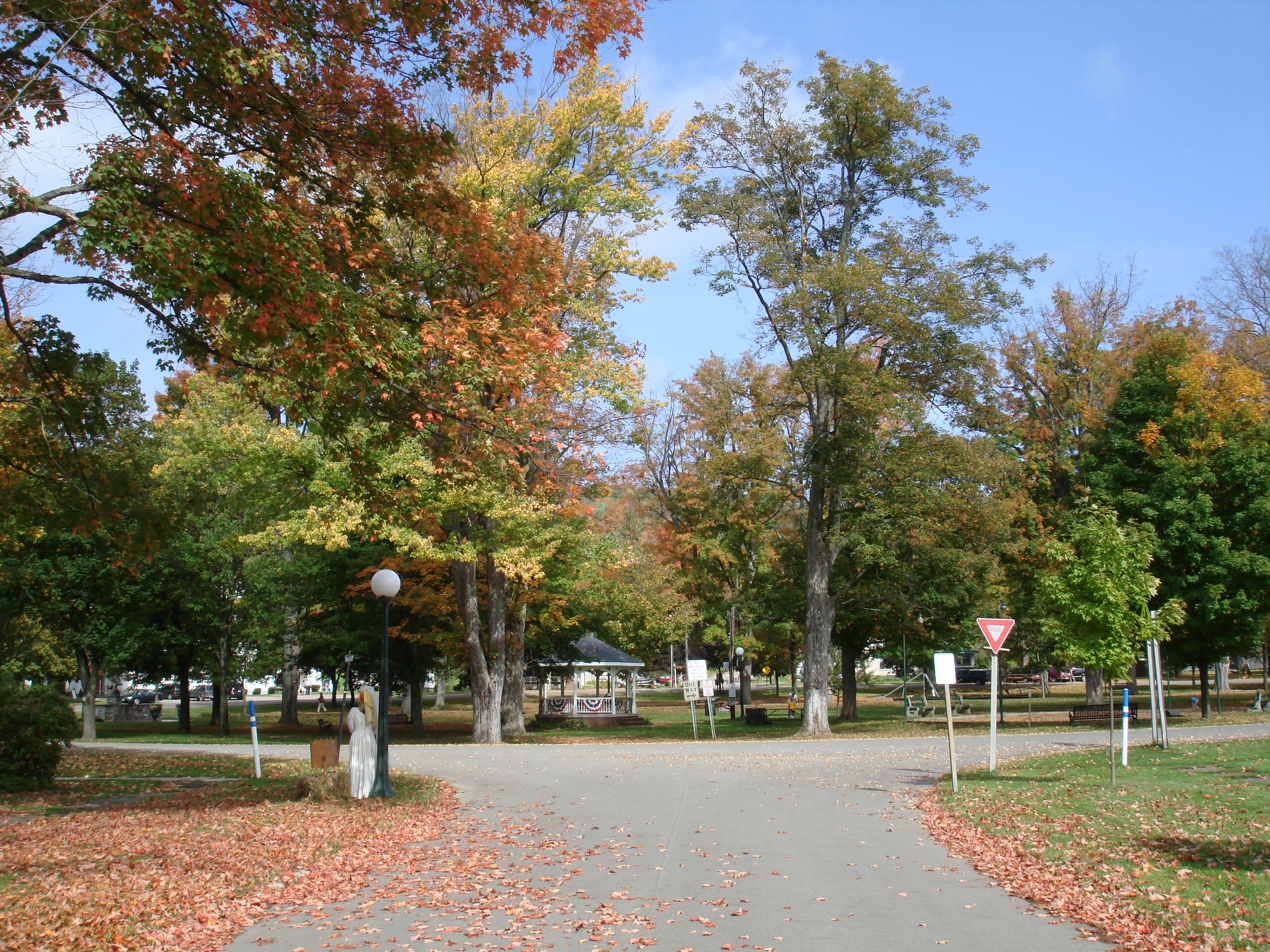

- Location within New York Location within the United States
- Location: Main and White Sts. and Allegany County Fairgrounds, Angelica, New York
- Coordinates: 42°18′21″N 78°0′56″W
- Area: 90 acres (36 ha)
- Built: 1800
- Architectural style: Greek Revival, Gothic
- NRHP reference No.: 78001840
- Added to NRHP: January 31, 1978

Angelica Park Circle Historic District is a national historic district in Angelica, Allegany County, New York, United States. The 90 acres (36 ha) district encompasses 97 buildings, including the octagonal village green, the county fairgrounds, and the Old Allegany County Courthouse.

It was listed on the National Register of Historic Places in 1978.
