= Belvidere (Belmont, New York) =

Historic house in New York, United States

- U.S. National Register of Historic Places
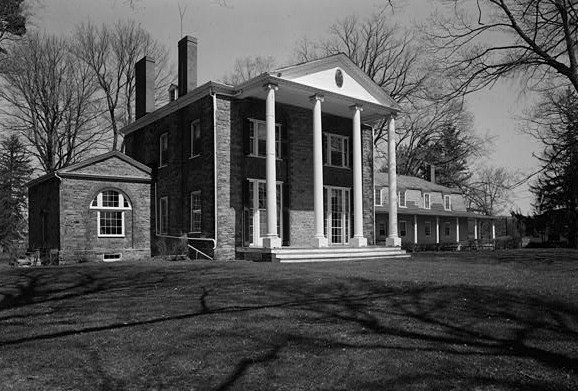
- HABS Photo of Belvidere, May 1967

- Location within New York Location within the United States
- Nearest city: Belmont, New York
- Coordinates: 42°15′54.2″N 78°02′57.5″W
- Area: 5 acres (2.0 ha)
- Built: 1804
- Architect: Latrobe, Benjamin
- Architectural style: Federal
- NRHP reference No.: 72000822
- Added to NRHP: March 16, 1972

Belvidere, also known as Villa Belvidere, is a historic home located in Angelica, near Belmont, Allegany County, New York. Built in 1804 from plans attributed to Benjamin Henry Latrobe, it is an outstanding example of Federal architecture. The mansion was constructed for early settler John Barker Church, former English Member of Parliament and brother-in-law of Alexander Hamilton through his wife Angelica Schuyler Church.

== Description ==
Belvidere is a large stone-and-brick mansion with a 2 1/2-story central block over a partial basement, a 2-story-over-basement east wing, and 1 1/2-story service wing. The house contains 30 rooms and 13 fireplaces. Also on the five-acre site are a nine-sided barn and hexagonal tea house, which was built in 1806.

It was listed on the National Register of Historic Places in 1972.
