= Angelica Raceway =

Defunct auto racing venue in Angelica, New York

- Location: Angelica, New York
- Coordinates: 42.3072°N 78.0103°W
- Operator: Jim Patrick and Al Bassett
- Opened: 1958
- Closed: 1965
- Surface: Dirt
- Length: .54 km (0.34 mi)

Angelica Raceway was a former 1/3-mile (0.54 km) dirt oval racing facility located Chautauqua-Alleghany (or the western Southern Tier) Region of New York State.

== Overview ==
Angelica Raceway operated on the Allegany County Fairgrounds from 1958 until 1965. The facility was operated for two years under the Independent Racing Association sanction before management was returned to the fairgrounds.

The speedway was one of a series of venues in the Twin Tiers region of New York and Pennsylvania where drivers began their careers before becoming known on the state and national scene.
