= Moses Van Campen House =

Historic house in New York, United States

- U.S. National Register of Historic Places
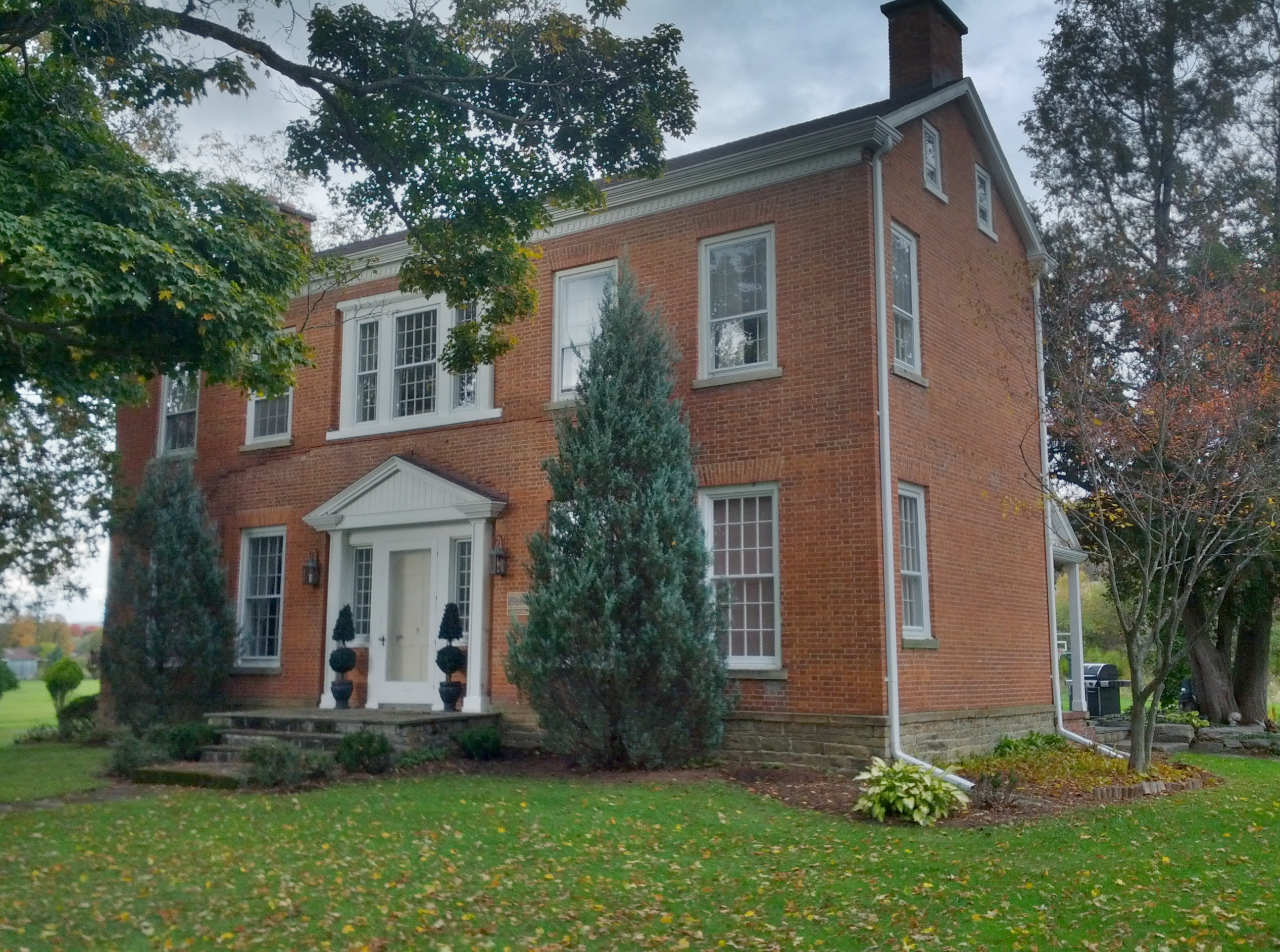
- Moses Van Campen House, September 2012

- Location within New York Location within the United States
- Interactive map showing the location of Moses Van Campen House
- Location: 4690 Birdsall Rd., Angelica, New York
- Coordinates: 42°18′7″N 77°59′55″W
- Area: 47 acres (19 ha)
- Built: ca. 1809
- Architect: Van Campen, Moses
- Architectural style: Federal
- NRHP reference No.: 04000287
- Added to NRHP: April 16, 2004

Moses Van Campen House is a historic home located at Angelica in Allegany County, New York. It is a 2 1/2-story, L-shaped brick and frame house with a 2-story addition. It was built around 1809 by Moses Van Campen (1757–1849) and is on a 47-acre (190,000 m^{2}) property. Van Campen was a Revolutionary War veteran, Indian fighter, and surveyor. He served as judge and justice of peace, and as Allegany county treasurer. It is acknowledged as the first brick structure in the area and one of the earliest extant structures along this road. The road was laid out in 1810 by Van Campen as the original Bath-Olean Turnpike.

It was listed on the National Register of Historic Places in 2004. It is currently a private residence.
