= Old Allegany County Courthouse =

- U.S. National Register of Historic Places
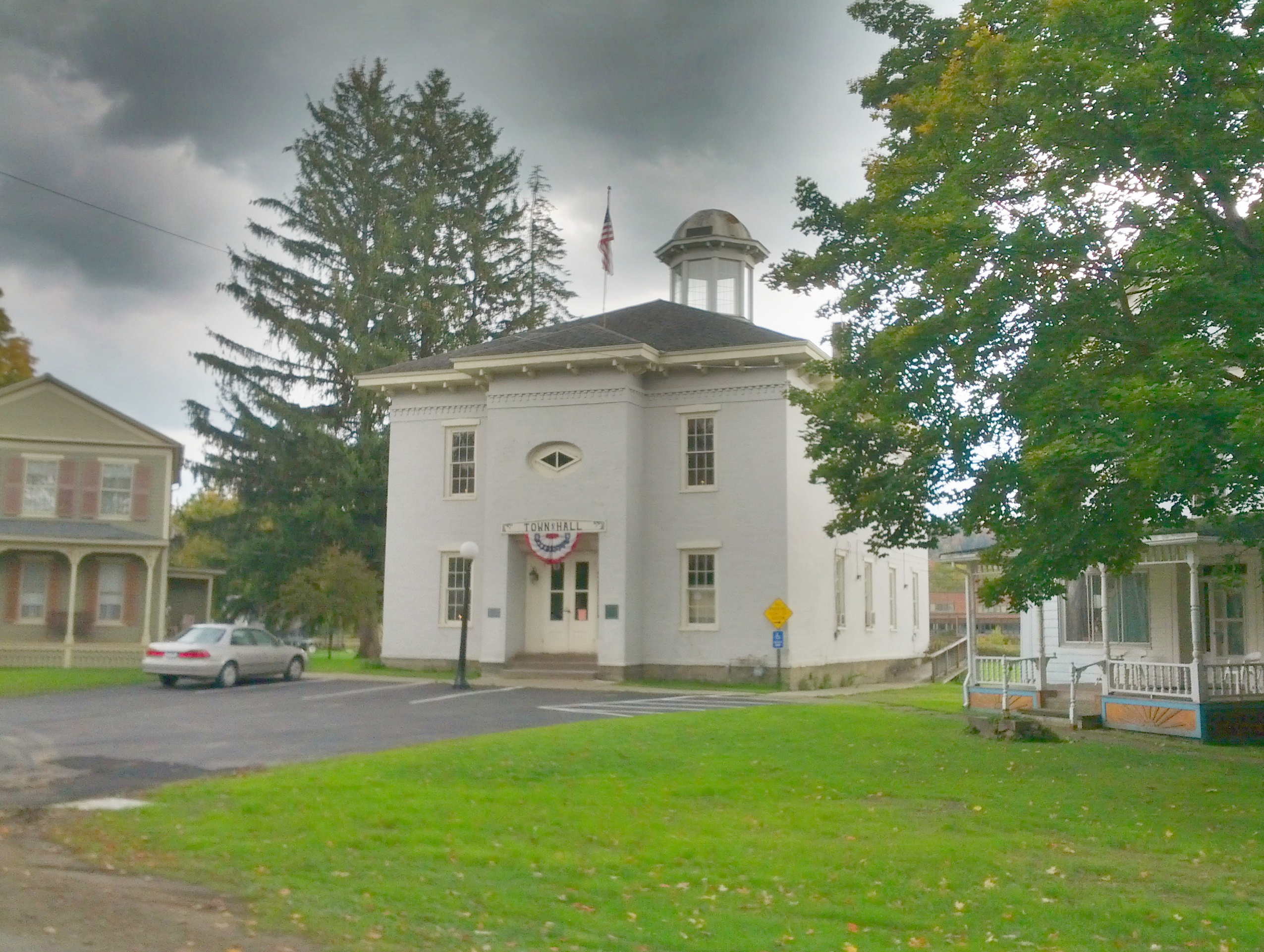
- Old Allegany County Courthouse, September 2012

- Location within New York Location within the United States
- Location: Park Circle, Angelica, New York
- Coordinates: 42°18′19″N 78°00′56″W
- Area: less than one acre
- Built: 1819
- NRHP reference No.: 72000821
- Added to NRHP: August 21, 1972

Old Allegany County Courthouse is a historic courthouse located at Angelica in Allegany County, New York. It was built in 1819 and used until 1892, when the county seat was moved to Belmont, New York. Since then, it has been used as school rooms, church, gymnasium, polling place, and as town offices for the town of Angelica. It is located within the Angelica Park Circle Historic District.

It was listed on the National Register of Historic Places in 1972.

== See also ==
- National Register of Historic Places listings in Allegany County, New York
