= Moses Van Campen =

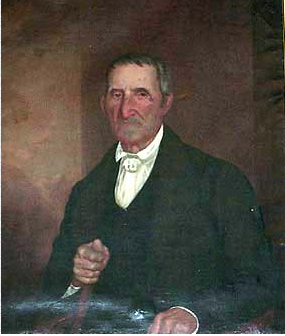
- Van Campen in 1846
- Born: January 21, 1757; Hunterdon County, Province of New Jersey, British America
- Died: October 15, 1849 (aged 92); Angelica, New York, U.S.
- Occupation: Soldier
- Years active: 1775 to 1783
- Height: 5.833 ft (1.778 m)
- Title: Major
- Relatives: Mandana Coleman Thorp

Major Moses Van Campen (1757–1849) was a soldier during the American Revolutionary War. He was a prominent figure in Pennsylvania and parts of New York. His primary involvement in the Revolutionary War was in fighting against hostile Native American tribes. He began service as a soldier in 1775 and retired from military service in 1783. Van Campen was familiar with Native American methods of warfare. He also participated in the Sullivan Expedition in 1779.

== Early life ==
Van Campen was born in Hunterdon County, New Jersey, on January 21, 1757. His father was a farmer named Cornelius Van Campen. He was of Dutch descent on his father's side and French descent on his mother's side. He was the oldest of six sons and four daughters, and was named after Moses Depue, his grandfather. Shortly following Moses Van Campen's birth, his family moved to Northampton County, Pennsylvania, near the Delaware Water Gap, where Van Campen spent most of his childhood. Van Campen was educated at home until the age of nine, when he was sent to a nearby school, where he learned surveying and navigation, and aspired to become a sailor. After he turned 16, he often hunted deer and wild turkey in the forests around his home. In 1769, Van Campen and his father moved to the Wyoming Valley.

In 1773, Van Campen and his family moved to an area near the West Branch Susquehanna River in Northumberland County. Van Campen also purchased a tract of land along Fishing Creek. While living here, according to a book by John Niles Hubbard, he commonly met Native Americans on his hunting expeditions, and commonly hunted with a Seneca person named Tom Sheno].

== Military service ==
=== 1775 to 1777 ===
Van Campen's first military experience was in 1775, although he did not play a significant role during this experience. At this time, he was recruited as part of a company of about 700 men under Colonel Plunket to fight an opposing company of British troops in the Wyoming Valley. Plunket's men went upriver for some distance, before beginning to march on December 1, 1775, while the boat continued traveling upstream as well. The company reached the Nanticoke falls on December 24, 1775. At this point, the river was found to be impassable due to the abundance of ice, so the entire company continued upriver on foot towards Fort Wyoming. However, before reaching the fort, they reached Shawnese Mountain and were fired at, although the attack was not devastating. The company crossed the river, but encountered an opposing force there as well. Since Plunket's men were not equipped for a long siege, they retreated down the Susquehanna River at this point.

Shortly after the Revolutionary War began, Van Campen began dealing with defending settlements on the frontier. Later, Van Campen was made a sergeant under the command of Thomas Gaskins and John Kelly. The regiment that Van Campen was in first went to Reids Fort near Big Island on the Susquehanna River. While stationed here, Van Campen was sent to a place called Young Woman's Town, 30 miles upstream along the Susquehanna River, in pursuit of a group of Native Americans who were camping there. After several days, Van Campen and the others were unable to find them, so they returned to Reids Fort.

=== 1778 ===
Van Campen was promoted to Lieutenant in 1778 and was subsequently placed under the command of Colonel Samuel Hunter. Near the beginning of April 1778, Van Campen and 20 other men marched to an area three miles above the mouth of Fishing Creek. Van Campen began building a fort in that area and named it Fort Wheeler. Its purpose of which was to defend local settlers against Native American attacks. In May 1778, while the fort was under construction, the Native Americans attacked it. The Indians besieged the fort until its supplies of ammunition and gunpowder were low. The siege failed, as more supplies were brought from the nearby Fort Jenkins. However, the fort was attacked again in June 1778. This time, Van Campen and ten other men fought them, causing the Indians to retreat.

Later in the summer of 1778, Van Campen and five other men were ordered to track down a group of loyalists who were hiding nearby. After traveling for one night, they discovered the Loyalist hideout. The loyalists barricaded themselves in, so Van Campen and his men entered the hideout by force, but the loyalists were quickly subdued.

Later in 1778, Van Campen received orders from Colonel Hunter to lead a company of men from Lancaster County and patrol nearby settlements and search for groups of Indians. The group travelled through the woods for three days without encountering any Indians, until they reached Eve's swamp, an area between Green Creek and Little Fishing Creek in the Fishing Creek watershed. The group then continued to Chillisquaque Creek, then over the Muncy Mountains to Muncy Creek. Finding no trace of any Indians, Van Campen then returned to Fort Wheeler.

=== 1779 ===
In 1779, Van Campen was a participant in the Sullivan Expedition, a military campaign against Loyalists and Iroquois. He was appointed to the role of quartermaster and charged with gathering provisions for the Sullivan Expedition. He started gathering the provisions between two and three months before the beginning of the expedition. On July 31, 1779, Van Campen, under the command of John Morrison, began moving up the Susquehanna River with 120 ships and 2000 horses carrying supplies for the Sullivan Expedition. They stopped at Tioga on August 11 to wait for their army. Annoyed at persistent ambushes by the local Indians, General Sullivan ordered Van Campen to head a company ambush the Indians. The orders to approach the Indians and then move out onto a nearby plain. They had a sentinel keep watch and planned to ambush the next group of Indians who went past. After some time, Van Campen's sentinel signaled that there were 15 Indians nearby, although it turned was a false alarm. General Sullivan then ordered Van Campen to spy on the Indians and determine how many there were, so he headed in the direction of a nearby Indian camp. He and his companion crossed the Chemung River and ascended a mountain, where they could see the campfires of the Indians. They continued down the mountain to the campfires. Van Campen then approached the campfires and estimated that there were 700 Indians there. The afternoon after he returned from this expedition, he was selected by General Sullivan to lead the advance guard in the army's upcoming battle. Van Campen and 26 other men then went as far as a place known as the Narrows, near Chemung, New York. Upon arriving at the location of the Indian village, the army found that it was deserted, and burned it down. They then proceeded to a ridge called Hogback Hill. The Indians attacked Van Campen's advance guard as it arrived at the top of the hill, causing 16 casualties. The advance guard pursued the Indians and killed several of them. On August 29, 1779, the battle between General Sullivan's army and the Indians began.

Later in the Sullivan Expedition, Van Campen and a group of other soldiers went to an Indian settlement at the headwaters of Baldwin's Creek. They burned down all of the approximately twenty houses in the settlement and returned to the army. On August 31, the army continued heading in the direction of Catherine's town, destroying Indian homes and croplands in their path. On their route, the army traveled into areas that were previously unexplored by people of European descent. The army continued up the eastern side of Seneca Lake, destroying several more Indian communities before turning towards the Six Nations community Genesee.

=== 1780 and 1781 ===
In 1780, Van Campen was captured by Indians of the Seneca tribe during a raid, who planned to take him to Niagara. However, at night, he and two other men who were taken prisoner killed nine of the ten Indians guarding them (the tenth escaped). Van Campen and the others then went to the Wyoming area. Van Campen then returned to Fort Jenkins. Later in 1780, he was ordered to destroy a nearby group of Senecas. He went to Northumberland with a number of other soldiers, then crossed the Susquehanna River and returned past Mahoning Creek to Roaring Creek. He and the soldiers disguised themselves as Indians and encountered a Loyalist hunter by the name of Wilkinson. Van Campen and the others convinced Wilkinson to take them to the Indian settlement. From there, Van Campen convinced the Indians to come with them, and the Indians were captured by a Captain Robinson. The Indians were then taken to Northumberland, where Colonel Hunter commanded that they leave the area for the duration of the war.

In the first few months of 1781, Van Campen did active service as a lieutenant. His work during this time consisted mostly of scouting around settlements and searching for small groups of Indians. His typical route on such missions was to travel down the Susquehanna River, then up the West Branch Susquehanna River to the headwaters of Chillisquaque Creek, Little Fishing Creek, and Muncy Creek. Van Campen was chosen for such scouting missions because of his skill as a marksman and his familiarity with the area.

Later in 1781, Van Campen went to Wilkes-Barre with a guard of six men. Along the route, he and his men passed through an uninhabited area, which included an island known as Rocky Island on the Susquehanna River. On Rocky Island, Van Campen discovered signs that Indians had been there not long before. As they passed this area, four Indians arrived to kill Van Campen, but they opted not to attack when they realized that he was going with six others.

Van Campen also was based at Fort McClure for part of 1781. During this time, he was involved in protecting locals from Indian attacks. While stationed at fort McClure, he was selected by Colonel Hunter to command a group of five soldiers who were to travel to Sinnemahoning Creek in disguise and spy on a group of 300 Indians who were based there. This expedition was known as the 'Grove party'. On the Sinnemahoning Creek, Van Campen and the others discovered a group if Indians, but there were far fewer than the claimed 300. When the group of Indians slept, Van Campen and the others went up to kill them, but they awoke. Six of the Indians were killed in the skirmish, but the rest escaped. He and his company then returned to Northumberland, where Van Campen remained until near the end of the autumn of 1781.

In late autumn, 1781, Van Campen was chosen to travel with his company down to Lancaster. He and his company went by boat as far down the Susquehanna River as Middletown before leaving the river and marching to Reading. Here, he and his company were joined by portions of the 3rd Pennsylvania Regiment, 5th Pennsylvania Regiment, and one company of the Congress Regiment. These soldiers had been assigned to guard a group of Hessian soldiers that had been taken prisoner by General Burgoyne. Van Campen remained in the vicinity of Reading until the spring of 1782.

=== 1782 ===
Van Campen and his companies returned from Reading at the end of March 1782. Van Campen passed through Northumberland before heading towards Muncy. Here, he was directed to rebuild a fort that was once located there until it was destroyed by Indians in 1779. In April 1782, shortly after the rebuilding of the fort commenced, Van Campen and a number of others went with a man named Mr. Culbertson to Bald Eagle Creek, where Clubertson's brother was killed by Indians. After selecting twenty men to go with him and Culbertson, Van Campen and the others travelled upriver to an island known as Big Island. The group set out overland to Culbertson's farm, where they spent the night. At this point, approximately 85 Indians of a Seneca tribe who were sailing downriver discovered Van Campen's group and set out to pursue them. When the Indians did catch up to Van Campen's group, the group fought them. Three of Van Campen's men escaped, a total of nine were killed, and several more were wounded. The remaining soldiers were then taken up the Susquehanna River valley to Pine Creek and from there through the Pigeon Woods to the Genesee River and Niagara. They were then taken to an Indian village in New York and beyond to near Buffalo Creek. Van Campen and the other prisoners were then taken to Fort Niagara and given to the British army. The British soldiers then took him to Montreal. He was then sent down the Hudson River to New York in December 1782. He was paroled and eventually returned to Northumberland via New Jersey.

=== 1783 ===
Near the beginning of the spring of 1783, Van Campen travelled to the Wilkes-Barre Fort to take command of it and the company of soldiers inside it. The purpose of this was to protect nearby settlers from Indian attacks. Van Campen commanded the fort until November 1783, when he retired from military service due to illness.

== Personal life and later life ==
His father and younger brother died in 1780, during an Indian attack, which Van Campen himself survived. After the Revolutionary War was over, Van Campen lived in Angelica, New York. He was friends with Captain Horatio Jones, who met Van Campen when Van Campen was captured in 1782. Van Campen was a freemason since at least 1808. He also enjoyed wrestling.

After retiring from the army, Van Campen married Margaret McClure, a daughter of James McClure, and owned a farm and estate for several years. He later purchased a tract of land near Briar Creek and remained there for five years. He moved to a little-settled area of New York in 1795, near the community of Almond. He then moved to the community of Angelica in 1805. In New York, he was employed as a surveyor and surveyed approximately 150,000 acres of land over the course of several years. He also aided in the creation of a number of important roads in the area.

In 1807, Van Campen was appointed to be one of the judges of the first court in Allegany County, New York. In the same year, he was appointed treasurer of Allegany County, a position he held until 1822. He also was a freeholder in 1808, 1809, and 1811. He, along with two other people, was chosen to build the Allegany County Courthouse and Allegany County Jail. Van Campen was a Justice of the Peace from 1812 to 1814. He was chosen to be the Commissioner of Loans for Allegany County in 1808, and he held this position until 1831, when he moved to Dansville. Van Campen was Allegany County's county treasurer from 1814 to 1826 and a constable in 1815. He was also an election inspector in 1824, an Assessor in 1824 and 1826, and Deputy County Clerk of Allegany County in 1828.

Van Campen helped build the Presbyterian Church of Angelica, New York, was ordained in 1812, and served at the church from 1812 to 1831.

Van Campen became paralysed due to illness in 1845, but recovered in 1847. He died in Angelica, New York, on October 15, 1849, at age 92.

== Legacy ==
In 1933, the Hotel Moses Van Campen opened in Benton, Pennsylvania. There was once a Moses Van Campen chapter of the Daughters of the American Revolution.

Moses Van Campen Boulder in Caneadea, with a memorial tablet, marks the location where Moses Van Campen ran the gauntlet as a prisoner of the Seneca people.

== See also ==
- Moses Van Campen House
