= Belmont, New York =

- Village
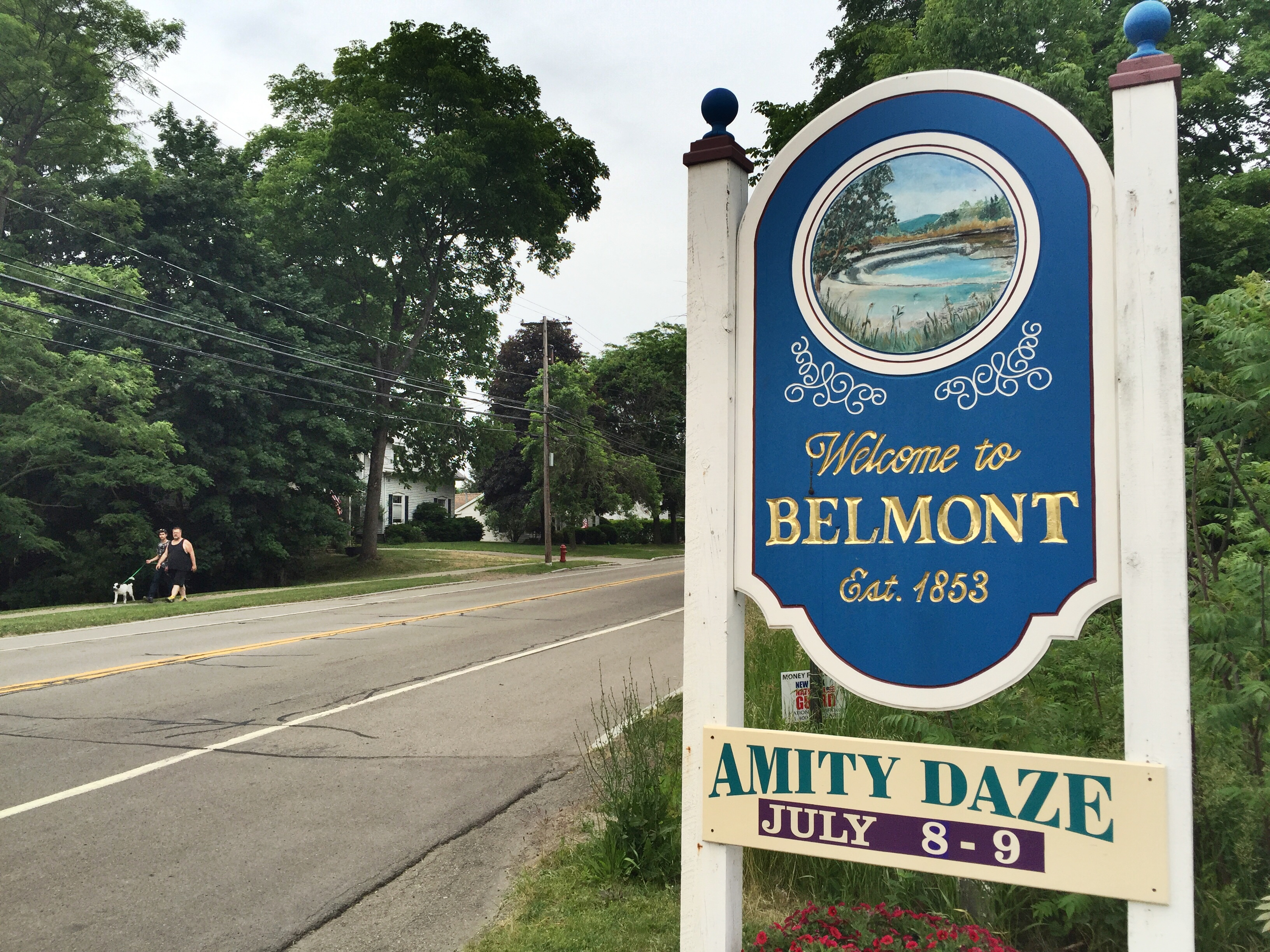
- Belmont sign on Willets Avenue

- Location within the state of New York Belmont (the United States)
- Coordinates: 42°14′N 78°2′W
- Country: United States
- State: New York
- County: Allegany
- Town: Amity
- Founded: 1833
- Incorporated: February 1, 1853

Area
  - Total: 1.00 sq mi (2.58 km^{2})
  - Land: 1.00 sq mi (2.58 km^{2})
  - Water: 0 sq mi (0.00 km^{2})
- Elevation: 1,391 ft (424 m)

Population (2020)
  - Total: 856
  - Density: 859.6/sq mi (331.89/km^{2})
- Time zone: UTC-5 (Eastern (EST))
  - Summer (DST): UTC-4 (EDT)
- ZIP code: 14813
- Area code: 585
- FIPS code: 36-05815
- GNIS feature ID: 977517
- Website: belmontny.org

Belmont is a village within the town of Amity in Allegany County, New York, United States. Belmont is the county seat of Allegany County. The population was 856 at the 2020 census. The village is centrally located in Amity and is northeast of Olean.

== History ==
Belmont was founded in 1833 as "Philipsburg", named after early settler Philip Church. The village of Belmont was incorporated in 1853 as "Philipsville". When the village assumed the community of Miltonville on the east bank of the Genesee River, it was renamed "Belmont" after an 1870 referendum. The name comes from the French word beaumont, meaning "beautiful hill".

The village became the county seat in 1859, replacing the village of Angelica.

The following are listed on the National Register of Historic Places: Belmont Grange No. 1243, Belmont Literary and Historical Society Free Library, and the Belmont Hotel.

== Geography ==
According to the United States Census Bureau, the village has a total area of 1.0 square mile (2.6 km^{2}), all land.

The village is split by the Genesee River and is at the junctions of NY Route 19, NY Route 244 and County Road 48. Belmont is on the mainline of the Western New York and Pennsylvania Railroad.

== Demographics ==
Historical population
Census	Pop.	Note	%±
1870	795		—
1880	804		1.1%
1890	950		18.2%
1900	1,190		25.3%
1910	1,094		−8.1%
1920	1,021		−6.7%
1930	1,085		6.3%
1940	1,146		5.6%
1950	1,211		5.7%
1960	1,146		−5.4%
1970	1,102		−3.8%
1980	1,024		−7.1%
1990	1,006		−1.8%
2000	952		−5.4%
2010	969		1.8%
2020	856		−11.7%
U.S. Decennial Census

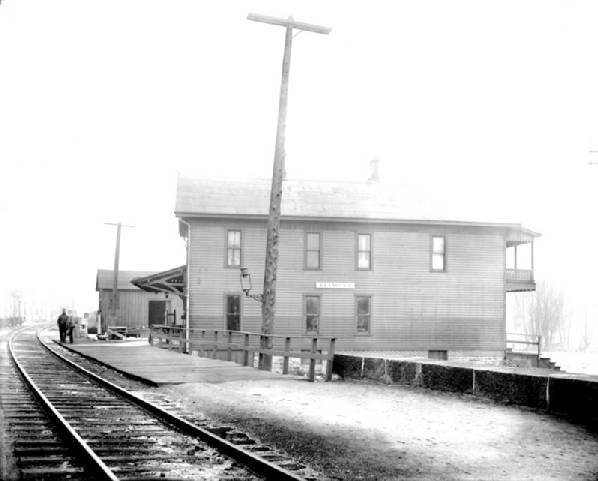
Railroad station in Belmont, New York, 1909

At the 2000 census there were 952 people, 392 households, and 241 families in the village. The population density was 952.9 inhabitants per square mile (367.9 inhabitants/km^{2}). There were 449 housing units at an average density of 449.4 units per square mile (173.5 units/km^{2}). The racial makeup of the village was 96.11% White, 0.95% Black or African American, 0.11% Native American, 0.11% Asian, 0.21% from other races, and 2.52% from two or more races. 1.05% of the population were Hispanic or Latino of any race. Of the 392 households 30.1% had children under the age of 18 living with them, 44.9% were married couples living together, 11.7% had a female householder with no husband present, and 38.5% were non-families. 33.7% of households were one person and 18.4% were one person aged 65 or older. The average household size was 2.31 and the average family size was 2.98.

The age distribution was 25.3% under the age of 18, 7.7% from 18 to 24, 28.5% from 25 to 44, 22.0% from 45 to 64, and 16.6% 65 or older. The median age was 38 years. For every 100 females, there were 104.7 males. For every 100 females age 18 and over, there were 98.1 males.

== Education ==
Belmont, New York contains 2 educational institutions within village limits. The BOCES Career and Technical Facility (5536 County Route 48 Belmont, NY 14813) and Genesee Valley Central School (1 Jaguar Dr. Belmont, NY 14813).

The median household income was $29,545 and the median family income was $35,625. Males had a median income of $28,365 versus $20,781 for females. The per capita income for the village was $14,149. About 9.9% of families and 12.7% of the population were below the poverty line, including 13.8% of those under age 18 and 6.1% of those age 65 or over.
